= List of supermarket chains in Norway =

This is a list of supermarket chains in Norway,

| Name | Stores | Type of stores | Parent |
|---|---|---|---|
| 7-Eleven | 152 | convenience | Reitan Group |
| Bunnpris | 250+ | discount | I. K. Lykke |
| CC Mat | 3 | supermarket | CC Mat |
| Coop Marked | 384 | convenience | Coop Norge |
| Coop Mega | | supermarket | Coop Norge |
| Coop Obs! | 33 | hypermarket | Coop Norge |
| Coop Prix | 315 | discount | Coop Norge |
| Deli de Luca | 98 | convenience | NorgesGruppen |
| Europris | 270 | department store | Nordic Capital Fund Vll |
| EuroSpar | 28 | supermarket | NorgesGruppen |
| Extra | 342 | discount, supermarket | Coop Norge |
| Jacob's | 2 | supermarket | NorgesGruppen |
| Joker | 465 | convenience | NorgesGruppen |
| Kaffebrenneriet | 41 | convenience | NorgesGruppen |
| Kiwi | 652 | discount | NorgesGruppen |
| Matkroken | 75+ | convenience | Coop Norge |
| Meny | 195 | supermarket | NorgesGruppen |
| MIX | 200 | convenience | NorgesGruppen |
| Narvesen | 315 | convenience | Reitan Group |
| Nærbutikken | 198 (Note: 163 profiled + 35 unprofiled) | convenience | NorgesGruppen |
| REMA 1000 | 626 | discount | Reitan Group |
| SPAR | 262 | supermarket | NorgesGruppen |

== Defunct chains ==
| Name | Type of stores | Parent |
|---|---|---|
| ICA Gourmet | supermarket | ICA Gruppen |
| ICA Maxi | hypermarket | ICA Gruppen |
| ICA Nær | convenience | ICA Gruppen |
| ICA Supermarked | supermarket | ICA Gruppen |
| RIMI | discount | ICA Gruppen |
| Lidl Norge | discount | Lidl |
| Iceland | discount | Iceland Foods Ltd |
| Ultra | supermarket | CentraGruppen |
| Centra | supermarket | CentraGruppen |
