= Coop Norden =

Scandinavian retail chain

Coop Norden AB
- Company type: Subsidiary
- Industry: Retail
- Predecessor: Nordisk Andels Forbund (NAF)
- Founded: 1918 (NAF); 2001 (Coop Norden)
- Defunct: 2008
- Fate: Dissolved
- Headquarters: Stockholm, Sweden
- Area served: Sweden; Norway; Denmark; Greenland
- Key people: Svein E. Skorstad (CEO)
- Revenue: SEK 89.5 billion (2005)
- Number of employees: 25,000
- Parent: KF; Coop NKL; FDB
- Subsidiaries: Coop Sverige; Coop Norge; Coop Danmark; Brugseni (KNB)
- Website: coopnorden.com

Coop Norden was a Scandinavian retail chain. It was based in Sweden and owned by three major cooperative retail companies: Sweden's KF (42%), Denmark's FDB (38%), and Norway's Coop NKL (20%). During its years of operation, Coop Norden ran around 1,000 stores and had a yearly turnover of approximately SEK 90 billion. In 2007, the parent companies decided to dissolve the arrangement and, in January 2008, operation and ownership of the retail chains were returned to the national cooperatives.

== Former chains ==
Sweden

- Coop Forum
- Coop Bygg — hardware store
- Coop Konsum
- Coop Extra — discount store
- Coop Nära

Denmark

- Brugsen — grocery store
- SuperBrugsen — supermarket
- Dagli'Brugsen — grocery store
- LokalBrugsen — small grocery store
- Irma — high-end grocery store
- Kvickly — supermarket
- Kvickly xtra — hypermarket
- Fakta — discount store

Greenland

- Brugseni (KNB)

Norway

- Coop Byggmix — hardware store
- Coop Elektro — electrical article store
- Coop Extra — convenience store
- Coop Kjøkken og Hjem — kitchen and interior store
- Coop Marked — grocery store
- Coop Mega — supermarket
- Coop Obs! — hypermarket
- Coop Obs! Bygg — hardware
- Coop Prix — discount store
- Coop Sport — sport store
