= Trondos =

Norwegian consumer cooperative

Coop Trondheim og Omegn BA
- Type: Cooperative
- Industry: Retailing
- Founded: 1970
- Headquarters: Trondheim, Norway
- Area served: Trondheim Region
- Operating income: NOK 2,872 million (2006)
- Net income: NOK 143 million (2006)
- Owner: NOK 165 million (2006)
- Number of employees: 1,153 (2006)
- Website: www.trondos.no

Coop Trondheim og Omegn BA or Trondos is the largest consumer cooperative part of Coop NKL in Norway. The cooperative operates 50 stores and has more than 100,000 members with operation in Trondheim Municipality, Malvik Municipality, Melhus Municipality, Skaun Municipality, and Stjørdal Municipality.

The company operates two Coop Obs!, five Coop Mega, two Coop S-Nærkjøp, one Coop Byggmix and 22 Coop Prix as well as one Domus Interiør, one Coop Obs! Sport and two YX Energi fuel stations. It also owns the shopping centres City Lade and City Syd.

== History ==
Trondos was founded on January 1, 1970 when seven cooperatives around Trondheim merged with the name Trondheim og Omegn Samvirkelag. But the first store was founded in 1895 in Hommelvik.
