= Lykke =

Lykke is a female Danish given name meaning 'happiness' and a surname. Notable people with the name include:

== Given name ==
- May Andersen (born 1982), Danish model
- Lykke Aresin (1921–2011), German physician and sexologist
- Lykke Friis (born 1969), Danish politician
- Lykke Frank Hansen (born 1988), Greenlandic handball player
- Lykke Li (born Li Lykke, 1986), Swedish singer-songwriter

== Surname ==
- Anne Lykke (1595–1641), Danish noblewoman and royal mistress
- Christina Lykke (born 1981), Danish politician
- Falk Lykke (1583–1650), Danish nobleman
- Hjalte Lykke (born 2004), Danish handball player
- Ivan Lykke (born 1946), Danish footballer
- Ivar Lykke (architect) (born 1941), Norwegian architect
- Ivar Lykke (footballer) (1889–1955), Danish footballer
- Ivar Lykke (politician) (1872–1949), Norwegian politician
- Jørgen Lykke (1515–1583), Danish nobleman, diplomat and politician
- Kai Lykke (1625–1699), Danish nobleman and courtier
- Mette Lykke (born 1981), Danish business executive
- Nils Lykke (1492–1535), Danish-Norwegian nobleman
- Nina Lykke (gender studies scholar) (born 1949), Danish–Swedish gender studies scholar
- Nina Lykke (writer) (born 1965), Norwegian writer
- Palle Lykke (1936–2013), Danish cyclist
- Sophie Lykke (died 1570), Danish noblewoman
- Trond Lykke (1946–2020), Norwegian merchant
- William Lykke (born 2004), Danish footballer
