= EXTRA Arena =

Football stadium in Trondheim, Norway

Extra Arena
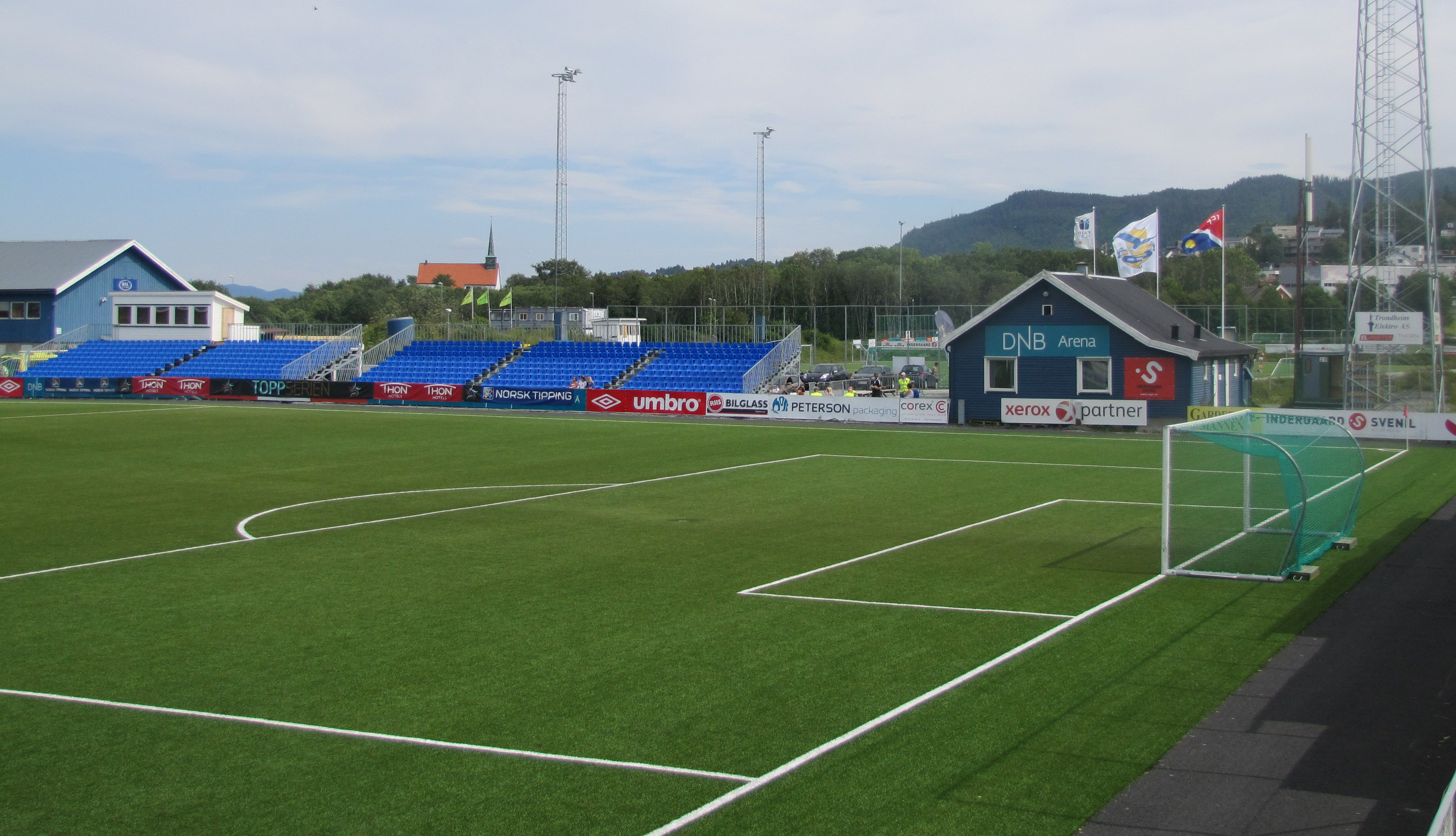
- Interactive map of Extra Arena
- Former names: Ranheim Stadion; DNB Nor Arena; DNB Arena; Ranheim Arena
- Location: Ranheim, Trondheim Municipality, Norway
- Coordinates: 63.4284°N 10.5240°E
- Capacity: 3,000
- Surface: Artificial grass
- Public transit: Ranheim idrettsplass, AtB lines 1, 41, 44, 54, 106, 201, 202; Ranheim Station, Trønderbanen

Construction
- Groundbreaking: 1939
- Built: 1939
- Opened: 1939, 11 July 2010
- Renovated: 1946, Spring/Summer 2010
- Expanded: 2010

Tenant
- Ranheim Fotball (1939–present)

Extra Arena (previous called Ranheim Stadion) is the home ground of the Norwegian football club Ranheim Fotball. It is located in the Ranheim area of Trondheim Municipality. A stand with about 1,000 seats under cover and a provisional stand with about 750 seats was built in 2010 to comply with the Norwegian Football Federation's seating capacity requirements for the top two divisions. The stadium's capacity was further enlarged in 2016 to comply with the 3,000 seats capacity requirements of the top division, Eliteserien.

The municipal library Ranheim bibliotek and the gym 3T-Ranheim are integrated into the main stand's building.

== History ==
The construction of grass pitch at the stadium was completed in 1939 at a cost of 8000 kr. The stadium had to be rebuilt after World War II. 5,000 spectators visited the reconstructed stadium at the first official post-war game against Vålerengen in 1946.

Extra Arena is a part of a larger sports facility complex named Ranheim Idrettspark. Planning of a redevelopment of Ranheim Idrettspark was made in 2005, but due to Ranheim Fotball's promotion to the second tier (1. divisjon) in 2009 season, Trondheim Municipality wanted to speed up the process and finance an upgrade of Ranheim Idrettspark, e.g. a new artificial pitch with an underground heating system. This was an important step in Ranheim's stadium redevelopment needed to meet NFF's requirements for football stadiums in the two highest divisions.

Ranheim Fotball itself organised the expansion of the stands with approximately 1,000 covered seats and new floodlights facilitated TV broadcasting. The completion of the redevelopment was scheduled for 10 July 2010, in time of Ranheim's first home game after the summer break in the 2010 season, but it was not finished until later that season.

Provisional stands with a total capacity of 750 seats was erected by volunteers, which increased the total capacity to 2,000 seats. The renovated arena was first used on 11 July 2010 in a 1. divisjon game Ranheim lost 1–3 against Løv-Ham. 656 spectators paid to follow the match. However, the official opening of the new arena was held on 26 September 2010.

Ahead of the 2016 season, a new section of seated stands was built. The stand has a 1,500 capacity, which, including provisional stands, increased the total capacity to 3,000 . 3,000 is the minimum number of seated capacity required in Eliteserien. The total cost of the stand was NOK 80 million.

== Naming rights ==
On 5 July 2010, Ranheim presented DNB ASA as their new main sponsor and announced that the naming rights of the stadium was sold to DNB. The new name of the stadium became DnB NOR Arena.

In March 2017, the stadium's naming rights were sold in a six-year deal to Norwegian cooperative Coop Norge who wanted to use the stadium name to brand Extra, their discount supermarket chain.

== Attendance ==
	Eliteserien
†	1. divisjon

League attendances
Season	Avg.	Min.	Max.	Rank	Ref
2010	515	206	891	12†	
2011	499	278	1,206	12†	
2012	488	189	801	14†	
2013	591	200	812	11†	
2014	613	436	1,067	13†	
2015	559	413	1,285	15†	
2016	755	549	1,583	12†	
2017	692	501	911	12†	
2018	2,018	1,393	2,919	16	
2019	1,883	1,353	2,925	16	

== Transport ==
=== Bus ===
The nearest bus stop Ranheim idrettsplass is primarily served by AtB lines 1 and 44. Less commonly served lines include AtB lines 41 (weekday afternoons and evenings), 54 (early mornings Monday-Saturday), 106 (early mornings Saturday-Sunday), 201 and 202 (both of them school routes).

=== Airport ===
Trondheim Airport in Stjørdal Municipality is 27 kilometres (17 mi) to the east.

=== Train ===
Ranheim Station on the Trønderbanen is approximately 550m away.
