= Vår kokbok =

Swedish classic basic cookbook

- Author: Anna-Britt Agnsäter 1951–1982; Birgitta Andrews 1986–2005; Barbro Lindgren 1986–2005; Sara Begner since 2009
- Language: Swedish
- Subject: Basic cooking
- Genre: Cookbook
- Publisher: Kooperativa förbundets provkök Norstedts förlag
- Publication date: 1951
- Media type: Printed, digital, audio
- Pages: 455 (1st edition); 896 (28th edition)
- Awards: Gourmand World, Best Bestseller 2016 (nominated); Gourmand World, Best Series 2016 (nominated); Gourmand World, Best Series 2017 (won)
- ISBN: 91-29-40345-6 (10th edition)
- Website: https://www.norstedts.se/bok/9789113114583/var-kokbok-v499465
- LIBRIS-ID:2145536 (1st edition)

Vår kokbok (English: Our Cookbook) is the oldest of the three classic basic cookbooks in Sweden, the other two being Rutiga kokboken and Bonniers Kokbok, and was first published in 1951 by KF:s Provkök. It was Sweden's most sold cookbook as of 2012, with 2.1 million copies sold since its publication.

The first edition was written by former home economics teacher Anna-Britt Agnsäter for KF Provkök. She initially made a "crisis book" about how to cook during food rationing, which was about to be printed. But during an inspiring trip to the USA she telegraphed home to stop the presses.

The new iteration was a more educational, scientific, and easy-to-use cookbook that contained clearer information and exact details about how to cook each dish. It did away with old, vague measuring units like "coffee cup" and "pinch", which were replaced with liters, deciliters, and milliliters. It was the first Swedish cookbook to use the four-piece measuring set and meat thermometer in the recipes. The cookbook has always advocated for modest, rational consumption. Its focus has changed over time, from covering efficiency to healthy eating to environmentally friendly cooking, but the endpoint has remained the same.

Vår kokbok is revised about every three years, with lighter and more in-depth revisions done alternately. It has been described as a reference work that young adults are gifted when they move away from home, which is then kept and used long past when it has fallen apart. In 2017 Norstedts Förlag published their 27th edition of Vår kokbok. In 2015 they also published Vår kokbok vegan. In 2016 Vår kokbok was nominated by Gourmand World in the categories "best bestseller" and "best series". In 2017 the publisher Coop-Norstedts won the Gourmand World Cookbook's "best series" award for the vegetarian version Vår gröna kokbok.
