= Inger Thorén =

Swedish chemical engineer and food chemist

Inger Arvidsdotter Thorén
- Born: Inger Arvidsdotter Bildt; 30 September 1913; Stockholm
- Died: 18 November 1985 (aged 72); Stockholm
- Occupations: chemical engineer, food chemist

Inger Arvidsdotter Thorén (née Bildt) (30 September 1913 – 18 November 1985), was a Swedish chemical engineer and food chemist. In 1938, she became the first woman assistant appointed at KTH Royal Institute of Technology.

== Early life and education ==
Inger Bildt was born on 30 September 1913 in Sankt Matteus parish in Stockholm, the daughter of Signe Borg and bureau chief Arvid Bildt.

She graduated from the KTH Royal Institute of Technology as Master of Science in Engineering in chemical engineering in 1938, and was appointed as the first female assistant in the university after graduation.

After marriage in 1941, she was known as Inger Thorén.

== Career ==
Thorén was an operations engineer at pharmaceutical company Kabi in Hornsberg in Stockholm between 1940 and 1949 and a cereal chemist at the Kooperativa Förbundet Cooperative Association's bakery laboratory between 1953 and 1957.

She worked at Kvarnen Tre Kronor's development laboratory from 1957 until 1960, and then as product manager at Kungsörnen's development department from 1960 to 1970.

Thorén was active in the Swedish Association for Nutrition and held teaching posts at various university departments in the field.

In her development work as a food chemist, Thorén was interviewed regularly from the 1950s into the 1980s in both national and local newspapers. Pieces covered subjects including school bread, ideal flour, corn flakes, protein additives in flour, labelling for sell and use by dates when it was introduced, and preservatives. She also appeared on the TV programme Konsumentens brevlåda in 1964. She wrote articles for the magazine Livsmedelsteknik and contributed to teaching materials such as Bagerikemi (1956), Bättre brödsäd (1956) and Att baka bröd (1983).

After retirement, Thorén worked as a consultant and carried out studies for the Svensk spannmålshandel (Swedish Grain Trade) and the Brödinstitutet (Bread Institute) in Stockholm. She was a member of the Bildt Family Association and the Bildt Homestead Museum in Morlanda on Orust.

== Personal life ==
Inger Thorén married the property manager Ernst Thorén (1913–1985) in 1941 and had three children with him, including veterinarian Kerstin Thorén Tolling.

Inger Thorén died on 18 November 1985 in Huddinge parish in Stockholm County.
