= Coop Kaffe =

Norwegian coffee brand

Coop Norge Kaffe AS
- Company type: Subsidiary
- Industry: Coffee
- Founded: 1953
- Headquarters: Oslo, Norway
- Area served: Norway
- Parent: Coop Norge Handel AS
- Footnotes / references (2011)

Coop Norge Kaffe AS is a Norwegian coffee purchasing and processing subsidiary of Coop Norge Handel, itself a subsidiary of Coop Norge, a coöperative grocery chain. The brand is exclusively distributed throughout the Coop stores in Norway. There are 12 different blends are available, including organic and decaffeinated.

== History ==
After World War II there was rationing of coffee and NKL was not given a quota relative to their proportion of sales, resulting in the need to purchase coffee quotas from other importers. Also, at this time the quality of coffee varied greatly because the wholesalers were not able to test the burnt coffee, only the raw beans. To solve this, NKL started its own coffee house in 1953 which allowed NKL to distribute its own imported coffee and test the burnt produce. But the greatest change was the introduction of the yellow and red bags of coffee that replaced the loose weight sale of the beans. Import was still restricted until 1960 due to restrictions, and that Norway had an agreement with Brazil to exchange coffee with clipfish. After 1960 Coop introduced vacuum packaged coffee, at first canned and later hard vacuumed, though in the 1980s loose weight coffee was reintroduced.
