= Coop amba =

Danish retail cooperative

Coordinates: 55.6579°N 12.3687°E

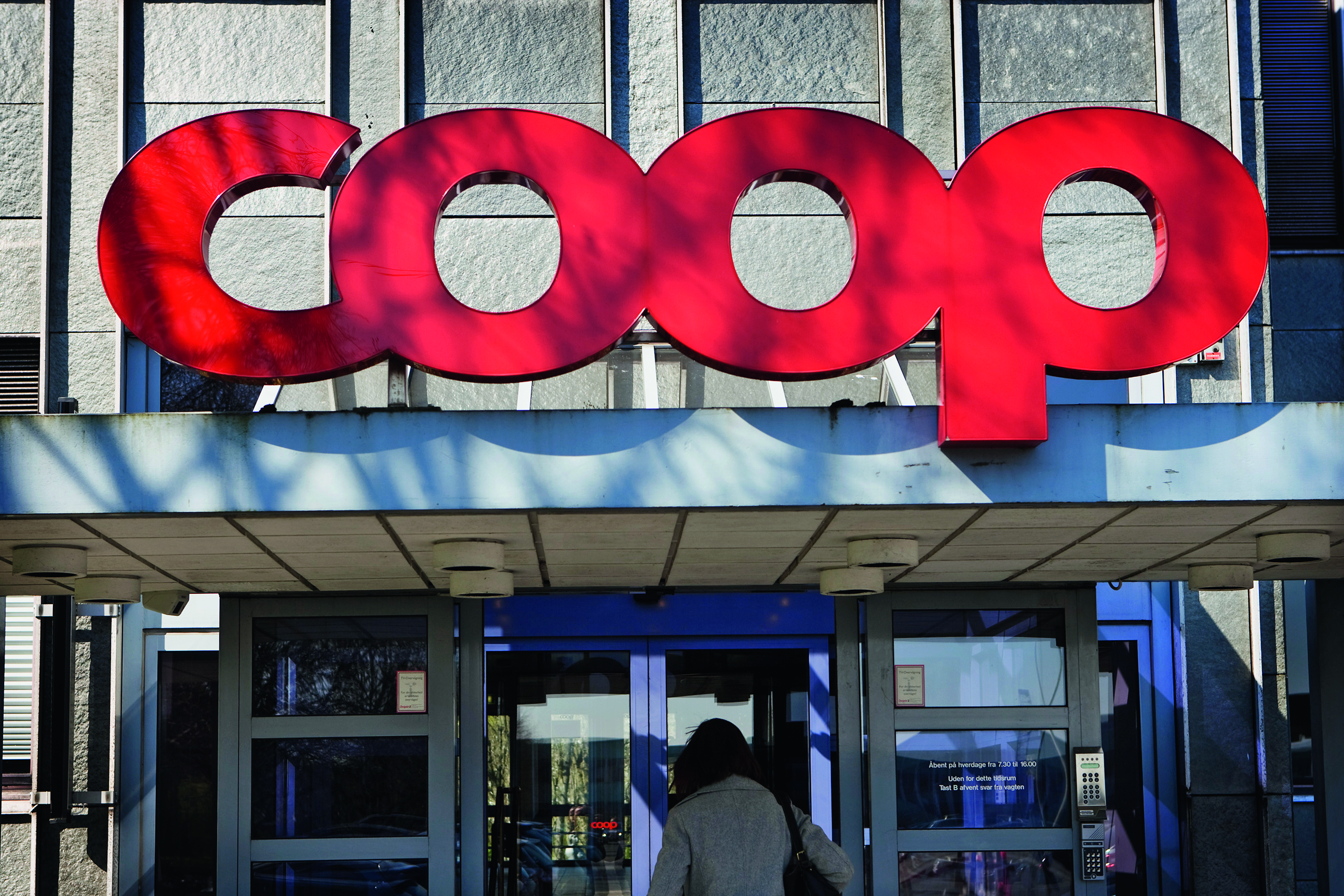
- Coop headquarters in Albertslund
- Company type: Limited liability cooperative (AmbA)
- Founded: 1 January 1896; 130 years ago
- Founder: Severin Jørgensen
- Headquarters: Roskildevej 65, Albertslund, Denmark
- Divisions: Coop Danmark, Coop Bank, Coop Invest
- Website: coop.dk

Coop amba, formerly FDB, is a cooperative based in Denmark. The coop has 2 million members and three subsidiaries. The Coop Danmark subsidiary operates the retail store chains of Kvickly, Brugsen, SuperBrugsen, Dagli'Brugsen and 365discount as well as the furniture company FDB Møbler. They previously ran the now discontinued chains Irma, Fakta & LokalBrugsen. The last two subsidiaries comprise Coop Bank and Coop Invest.

== History ==
An association of cooperatives formed in Zealand in 1884 was first named the Fællesforeningen for Danmarks Brugsforeninger (Danish Consumers Cooperative Society, in English), but the later FDB was founded in 1896 from a merger between that association and the cooperative association for Jutland. In 1897, it began forming its own factories and brands, some of which – like Cirkel-brand coffee – continue to be successful although most were shuttered in the 1980s and 1990s. In 1918, it helped form the NAF (Nordisk Andels Forbund, "Nordic Coop Federation") which later became Coop Norden AB. In 1952, it opened the first viable supermarket in the Faroes at Thorshavn.

FDB originally focused on manufacturing and wholesaling, branding its retail operations simply "Brugsen" ("Coop"). In 1961, it opened the Kvickly chain in Aalborg, which sold clothes and hardware in addition to food. It merged with the large Hovedstadens Brugsforening supermarket chain in 1971 and opened the discount OBS! chain in 1972 at Høje Tåstrup. By the 1980s, the company began shuttering its factories and focusing more on retail operations. It purchased Irma in 1982 and Fakta in 1987. Between 1991 and 1995, it rebranded its own stores as the SuperBrugsen supermarkets, the Dagli'Brugsen local markets, and the LokalBrugsen convenience stores.

All of these outlets were placed under Coop Danmark in 2001 in preparation for the 2002 union of its operations with those of Norway's NKL and Sweden's KF as Coop Norden. FDB held a 38% stake in the new unitary company, but its poor performance caused the parent companies to redivide its operations by 2008. FDB continued to organize its retailers under the Coop Denmark heading, and in January 2013, FDB changed its name to Coop.

Due to retail market moving towards discount shops, premium chains Irma, Kvikly and SuperBrugsen were supposed to merge into a single eponymous chain called Coop. However, due to continuing struggles of the company, the plan was abandoned, with half of Coop amba being sold to energy company OK and Irma shops being converted into SuperBrugsen or shut down as planned.

== Subsidiaries ==
Coop amba wholly owns the three subsidiaries of Coop Danmark, Coop Invest and Coop Bank. Coop Invest owns Republica A/S, an advertising company focused on retail sales, and Severin A/S, a training center first built in 1932.

=== Coop Danmark ===
Coop Danmark is the second-biggest retailer of consumer goods in Denmark, with a market share of 40% and 1.4 million members. Its main competitors are the dominant Salling Group (covering Netto, Føtex and Bilka), REMA 1000, Dagrofa (covering SPAR, Meny and Kiwi) and Lidl. With 939 (2024) supermarkets, discount stores and hypermarkets in Denmark, Coop Danmark operates the following stores: Kvickly, Brugsen, Dagli'Brugsen, SuperBrugsen & 365discount, and is known for the now closed chains LokalBrugsen, Fakta & Irma. Coop Danmark and its subsidiaries have 38,527 employees (2024) and post a yearly turnover of 45.859 billion DKK (2024).

In April 2017, Coop Danmark launched a digital crowdfunding platform in cooperation with Lendino. Major projects include the development of environmentally friendly cattle feeding with a budget of 2.5 million DKK, an apple orchard on Fejø for 660.000 DKK, and a whiskey distillery on Ærø.

==== Irma supermarkets ====
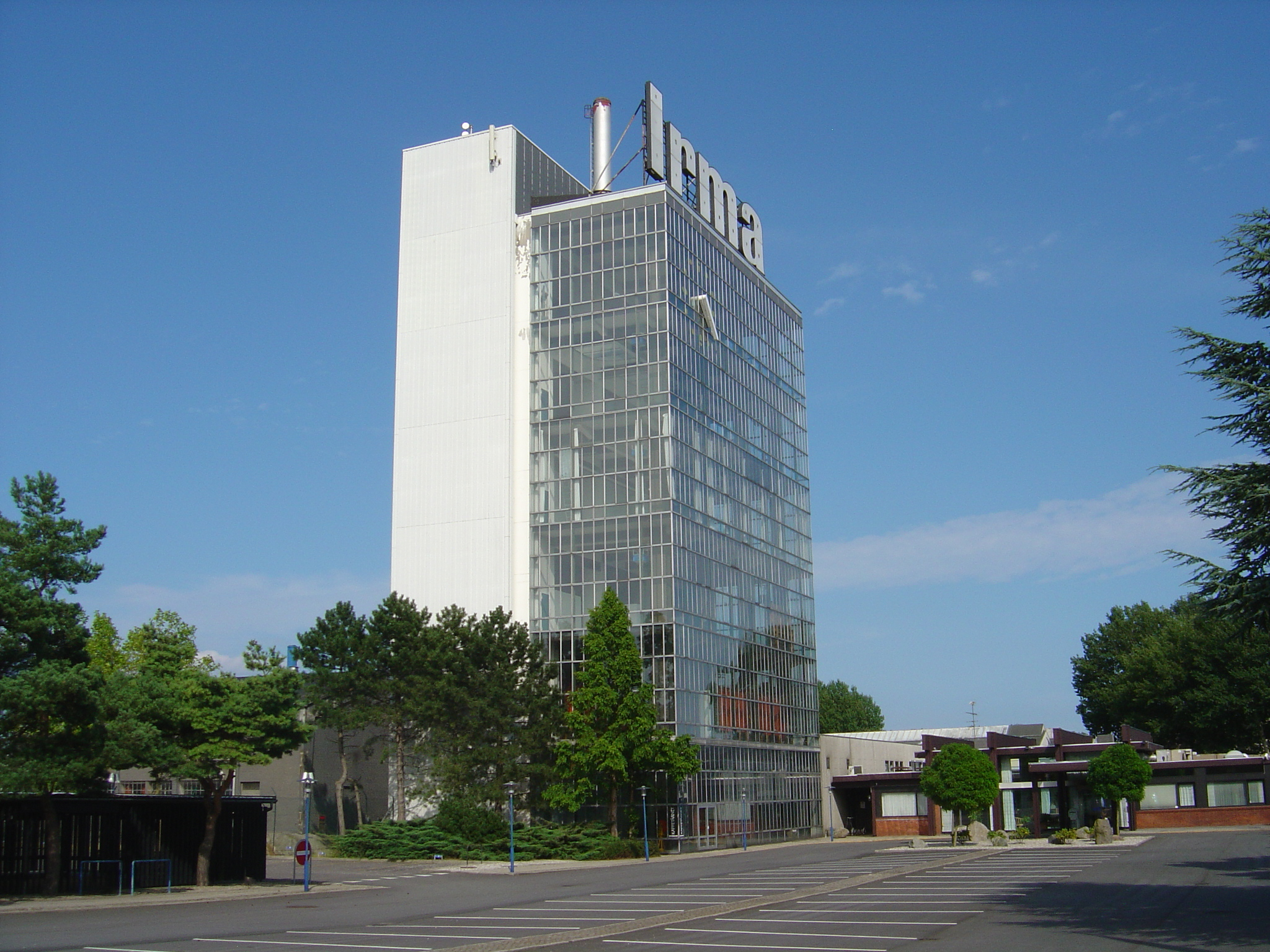
The headquarters of Irma Center located in Rødovre

Irma, a former supermarket chain operated by Coop Danmark, was founded in 1886 by Carl Schepler as a small grocery store selling eggs in Ravnsborggade in Nørrebro, Copenhagen. The chain was the second oldest groceries chain in the world, after Marks & Spencer. As of 2015, the chain had 80 stores, mostly located in the Metropolitan Copenhagen area.

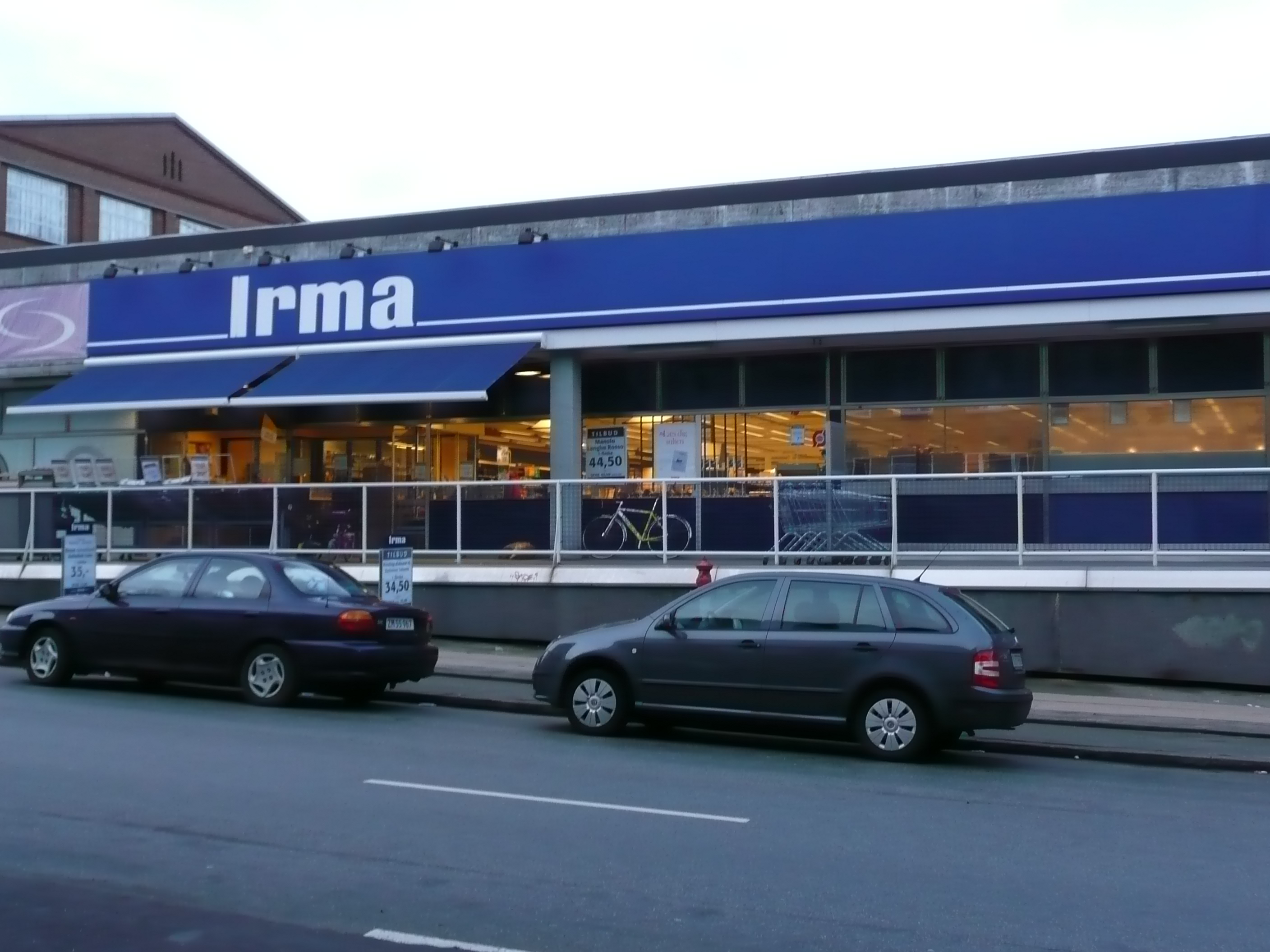
An Irma store in Copenhagen East

Irma was quality-oriented mainly aiming for quality-conscious and environment-aware customers by focusing on fresh and organic products as well as packaging. Therefore, the stores had a great variety of organic products compared to other Danish supermarkets, and packaging containing PVC and excessive amounts of aluminium were banned from the shelves. The same goes for chlorine-bleached products. Irma banned battery cage eggs in 1994, 8 years before it was banned by the European Union.

In 2007, Irma set a world record with 29.9% of its total sales being organic food. Irma had a goal of having organic products accounting for half of its total food sales before 2025. In 2015, Irma was named the most sustainable brand in Denmark, a title which parent company Coop won in 2016.

Starting in 2001 Irma began operating an express version of the store, known as Irma City. These stores were smaller than the normal Irma, with longer opening hours and a range of organic food to take away. In 2015, it was announced that Irma City stores would be replaced by the new concept Lille Irma (Little Irma), where the customers would have a say in the selection of goods available in the stores. The Lille Irma concept was planned to have fully replaced Irma City by the end of 2017.

In April 2008, Irma took over the grocery departments Mad & Vin (Food and Wine) of department store chain Magasin du Nord in the stores in both Odense and Aarhus. The projects failed and the stores closed in 2012.

On 31 January 2023, Coop Danmark announced that all Irma supermarkets would be rebranded or closed in the course of the year.

==== Brugsen ====
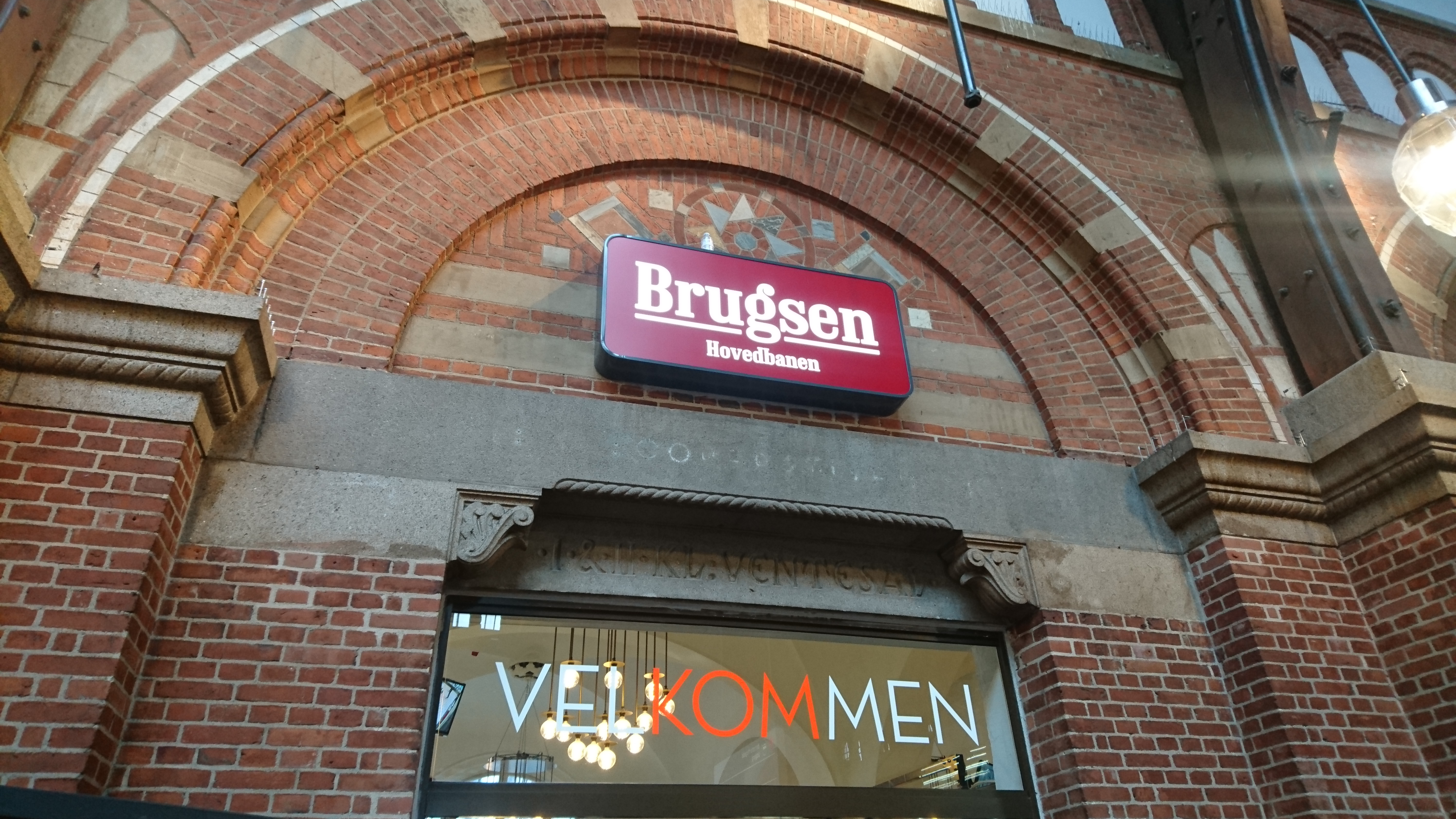
Brugsen at Copenhagen Central Station

Brugsen was originally the nondescript brand name of Coop amba's retail outlets in Denmark. After opening a series of branded stores starting in 1961 and deciding to focus on its retail operations in the 1980s, Coop began closing factories, and spun off its larger Brugsen stores as SuperBrugsen in 1991 and its smaller ones as Dagli'Brugsen the next year. In 1995, the smallest convenience stores were organized as LokalBrugsen.

After a failed attempt to merge their operations with Norway's Coop Norge (NKL) and Sweden's Kooperativa Förbundet (KF) as Coop Norden in 2002, Coop amba regained sole ownership of the group's Danish operations, Coop Danmark, in 2008. Coop Denmark continues to operate the SuperBrugsen, Dagli'Brugsen, and LokalBrugsen chains as separate divisions of its operations.

From 2016 Coop re-branded four of the existing Coop stores to Brugsen once again, including a flagship store inside the hall of Copenhagen Central Station.

==== Kvickly ====
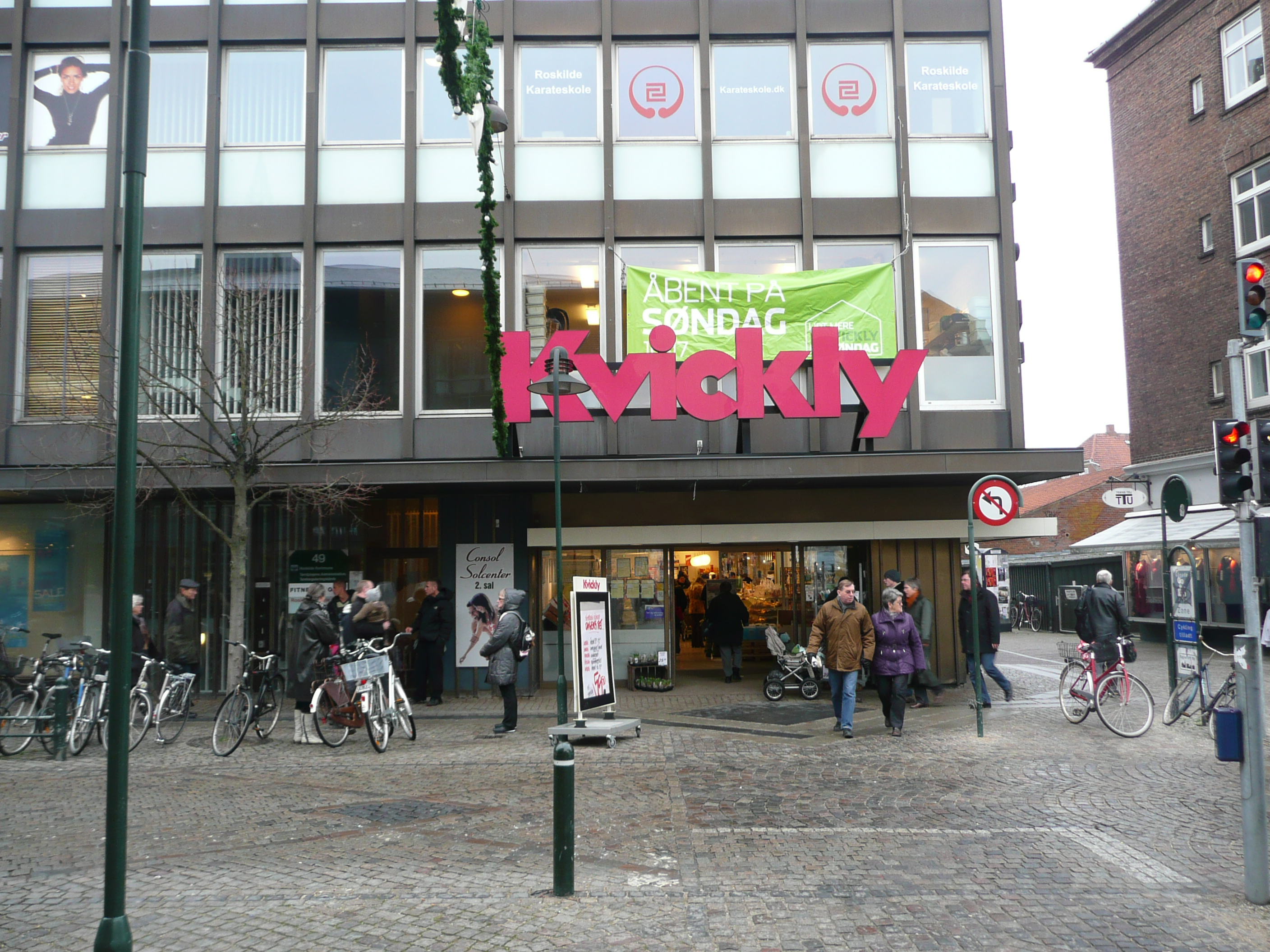
Kvickly in Roskilde, Denmark

Kvickly was in the beginning a Swedish food market chain owned by the 'consumers organization' ('Konsumentföreningen') in Sweden. The first store opened in the 1950s in the Stockholm area. The company name was changed to Domus in Sweden in the late 1960s/early 1970s when the stores became superstores selling more than food.

The first Kvickly store was opened by FDB in Denmark in 1961. In Denmark, the sister chain remains Kvickly, which has a large selection of items, and were in 2010 named by the Danish Ministry of Health as the easiest place in Denmark to buy healthy food. Kvickly's headquarters are in Albertslund, and it has 81 stores.

==== Fakta ====
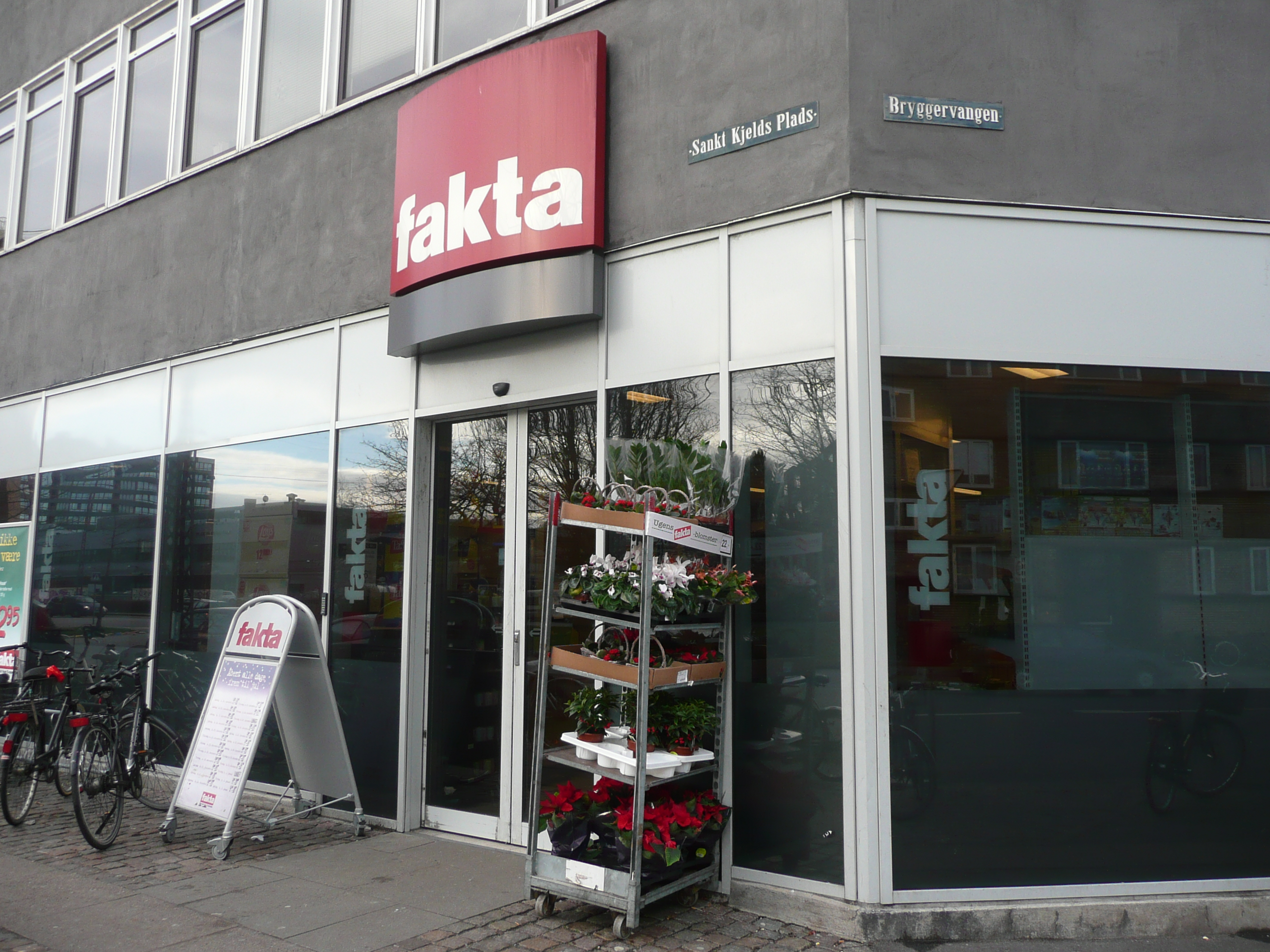
Fakta in East Copenhagen

Fakta, a chain of discount stores as of September 2022 superseded by 365discount and was founded in 1981 as Dansk Discount A/S, renamed Fakta in 1982. Six years later, the chain became a part of Coop Danmark. In May 2011, Fakta had 374 stores with around 6,000 employees. They operated stores located at more central urban places, called Fakta Q, which sold food, primarily convenience food. They were replaced by regular Fakta stores with Fakta Q being discontinued in 2017. Fakta's slogan is "Det er Fakta" ("It's a fact" or "It's Fakta"). The old slogan "Det er sund fornuft" ("It's common sense") is still used on Fakta-branded products. In the 21st century their slogan became "det tager kun 5 min" ("it only takes 5 mins"). In 2013, Fakta opened its first two stores in Germany, just south of the Danish border.

==== 365discount (formerly Coop 365 or Coop 365discount) ====
In 2020 Coop began experimental opening of a new brand of stores then named, Coop 365. This resulted in Coop in September 2022 deciding to completely revamp their discount offering by rebranding all Fakta stores (also closing some and rebuilding others) to this new brand, which, after several renames, ended up as 365discount.

== See also ==
- List of cooperatives
