= Bunnpris =

Norwegian supermarket chain

I. K. Lykke AS

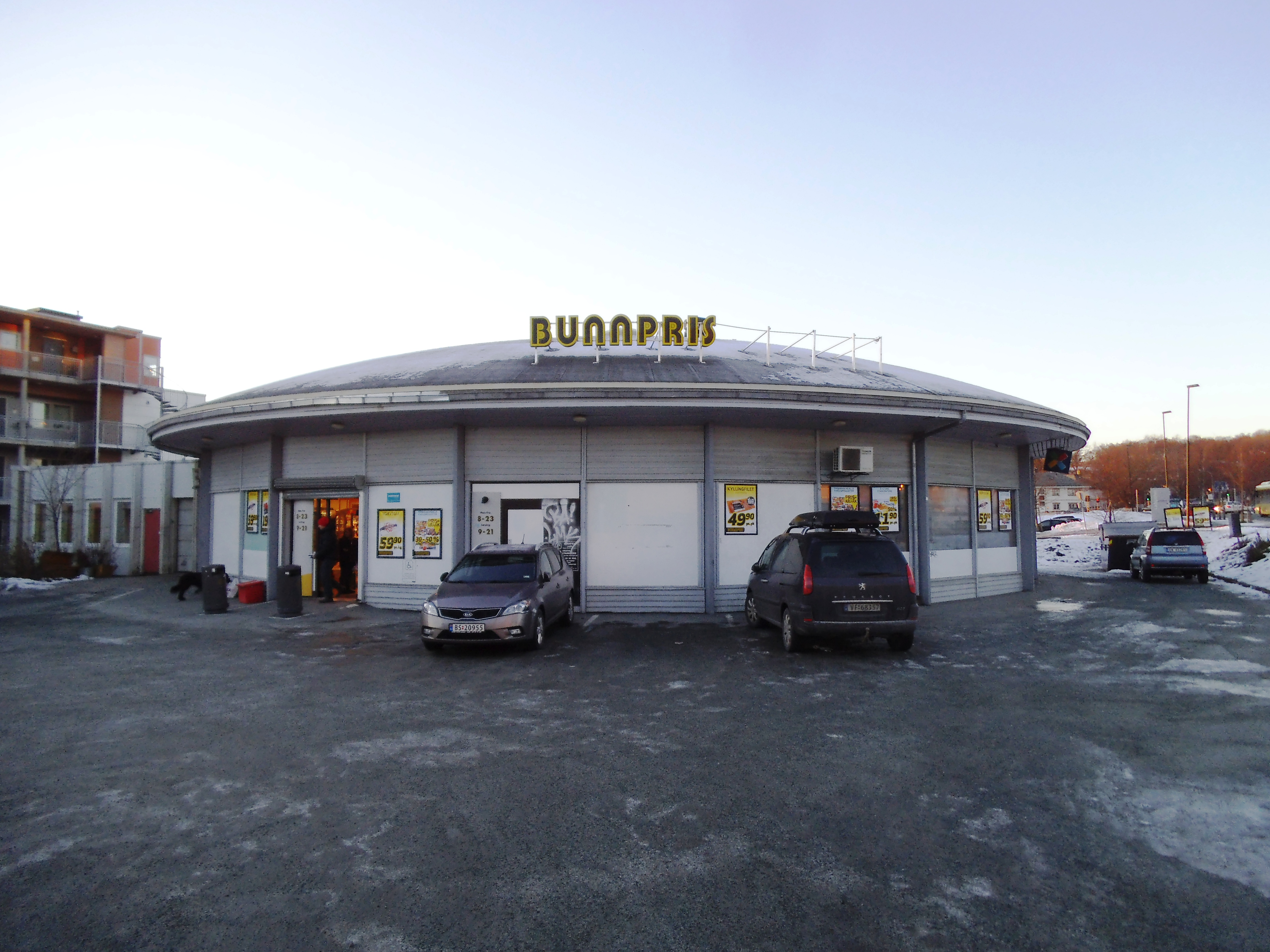
- Company type: Private
- Industry: Retail
- Founded: 1981
- Headquarters: Trondheim, Norway
- Area served: Norway
- Key people: Trond Lykke (CEO)
- Revenue: ▲NOK 3.2 billion (2006)
- Website: www.bunnpris.no

Bunnpris is a Norwegian retail chain with 216 grocery stores in 2011 in Norway, primarily in Sør-Trøndelag, Møre og Romsdal and Oslo, but also many in Northern Norway. The stores are managed by I. K. Lykke run by the fifth generation Lykke.

== History ==
It all started in 1830 when Iver Knudsen Lykke started exporting millstones by ship to Southern Norway and Eastern Norway. Because he usually was paid in agricultural products, Lykke started a fat store in Trondheim, and from the 1860s it was exported to England. The third generation was Ivar Lykke, who was Prime Minister of Norway 1926 to 1928.

In 1981 Trond Lykke, fifth generation, started the low-price store Bunnpris at Øya in Trondheim. Since then the company has expanded throughout the country. In 2006 a number of unsatisfied ICA franchisees have switched to Bunnpris, escalating the growth of the chain.
