= Coop (Sweden) =

Swedish grocery store chain

- Type: Grocery store chain
- Number of locations: Circa 800 stores
- Area served: Sweden
- Revenue: 29,300,000,000 Swedish krona (2019)
- Parent: Kooperativa Förbundet
- Website: coop.se

Coop is a chain of consumer co-operative owned grocery stores in Sweden, organised under Kooperativa Förbundet (KF). Coop Sverige AB coordinates purchasing, marketing and shared services for the chain's approximately 800 stores, which are owned and operated by local consumer organisations or their franchisees. The current Coop brand was introduced by KF in 2001, replacing a variety of different brandings.

== History ==
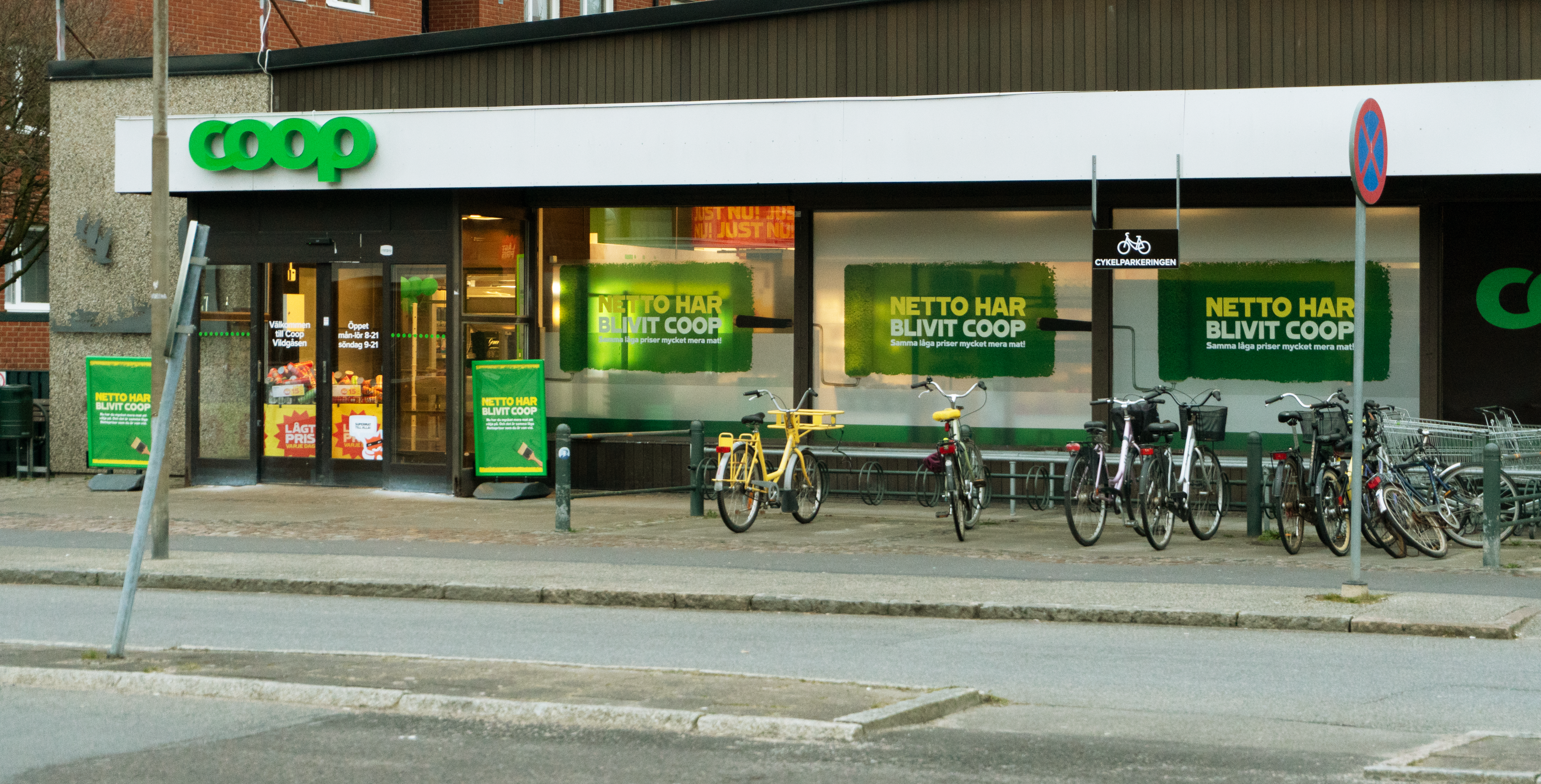
Coop in Lund, what used to be a Netto before Coop's acquisition of the Swedish Netto chain

The main Swedish consumer cooperative organisation, Kooperativa Förbundet (KF), was founded in 1899, with the organisation being a dominant player in the Swedish market throughout the 20th century. The main brand of KF stores was Konsum, though it was one among many, with many different chains existing within the KF organisation. Ahead of the merger into Coop Norden KF centralised their branding under the Coop name in the early 2000s, with larger Konsum stores becoming Coop Konsum, and various hypermarket brands being centralised as Coop Forum.

In 2015 the Coop chain was rebranded as part of a reorganisation within the KF organisation, with stores being branded under the Coop, Stora Coop and the short-lived Lilla Coop names.

=== Decline ===
By 2024, Kooperativa Förbundet had declined from once being Scandinavia's largest company with 80 000 employees to owning a grocery store chain with acculumating losses. In the early 1900s, the Swedish market had a lot of cartel formations in various consumer-facing industries which pushed Coop to acquire or start its own manufacturing operations in order to offer cheaper prices.

Coop built up a large variety of brands and factories, e.g. Hugin vacuum cleaners, Gislaved tyres, Eve butter, Gustavsberg porcelain and others. Coop also owned a huge property portfolio in Sweden that included Domus department stores.

Around 1990, KF decided to concentrate on the grocery retail business and had already begun and continued to sell off its manufacturing and real estate portfolio. Meanwhile, the grocery store business accumulated huge financial losses. Between 1988 and 1998, Coop's combined loss totaled approximately 15 billion SEK. By 2022, none of the industries and real estate it once owned remained, and Coop continued to accumulate losses. In 2023 and 2024, Coop made a combined loss of 1,5 billion SEK.

In a June 2024 interview with Dagens Nyheter, Coop's chairman Leif Linde said that Coop had the last chance to turn around the business.

== Brands ==
=== Current brands ===
==== Coop ====
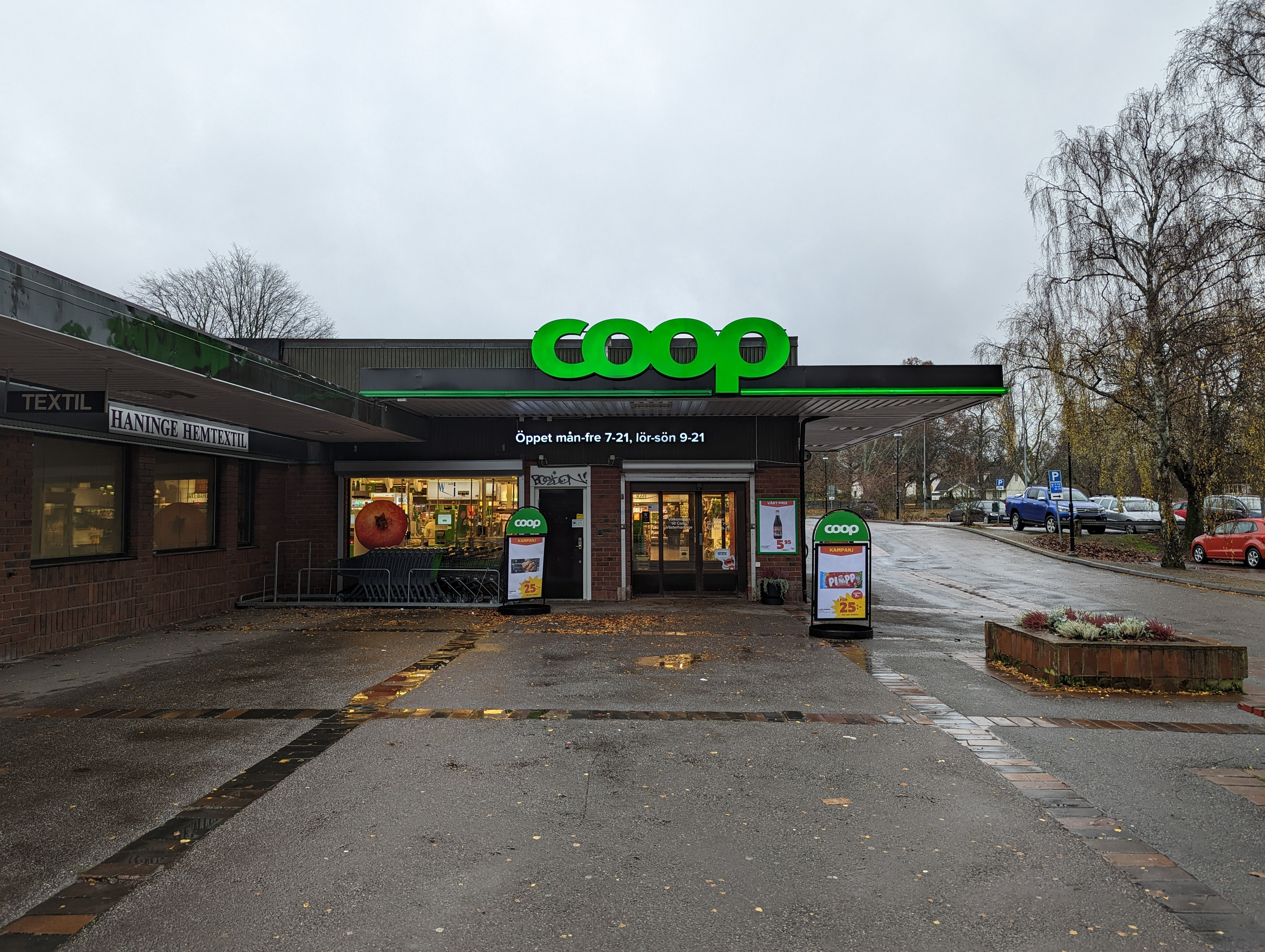
A Coop in Västerhaninge

Coop serves as the brand for small-to-medium-sized grocery stores, mainly what were former Coop Konsum, Extra and Nära stores, as well as the short-lived Lilla Coop brand.

==== Stora Coop ====
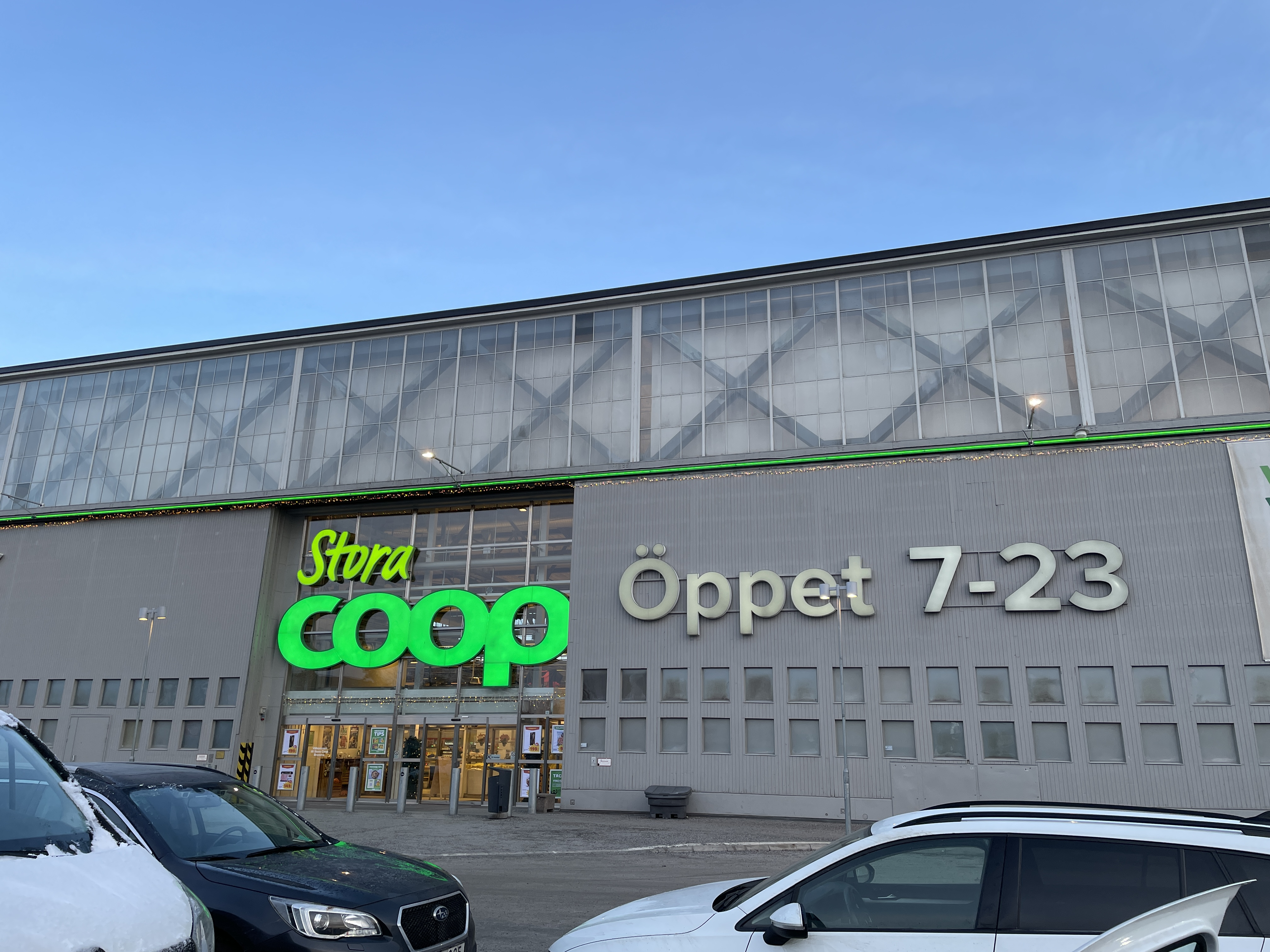
A Stora Coop in Bromma

Stora Coop serves as the brand for larger stores and hypermarkets, mainly former Coop Forum stores.

==== X:-tra ====
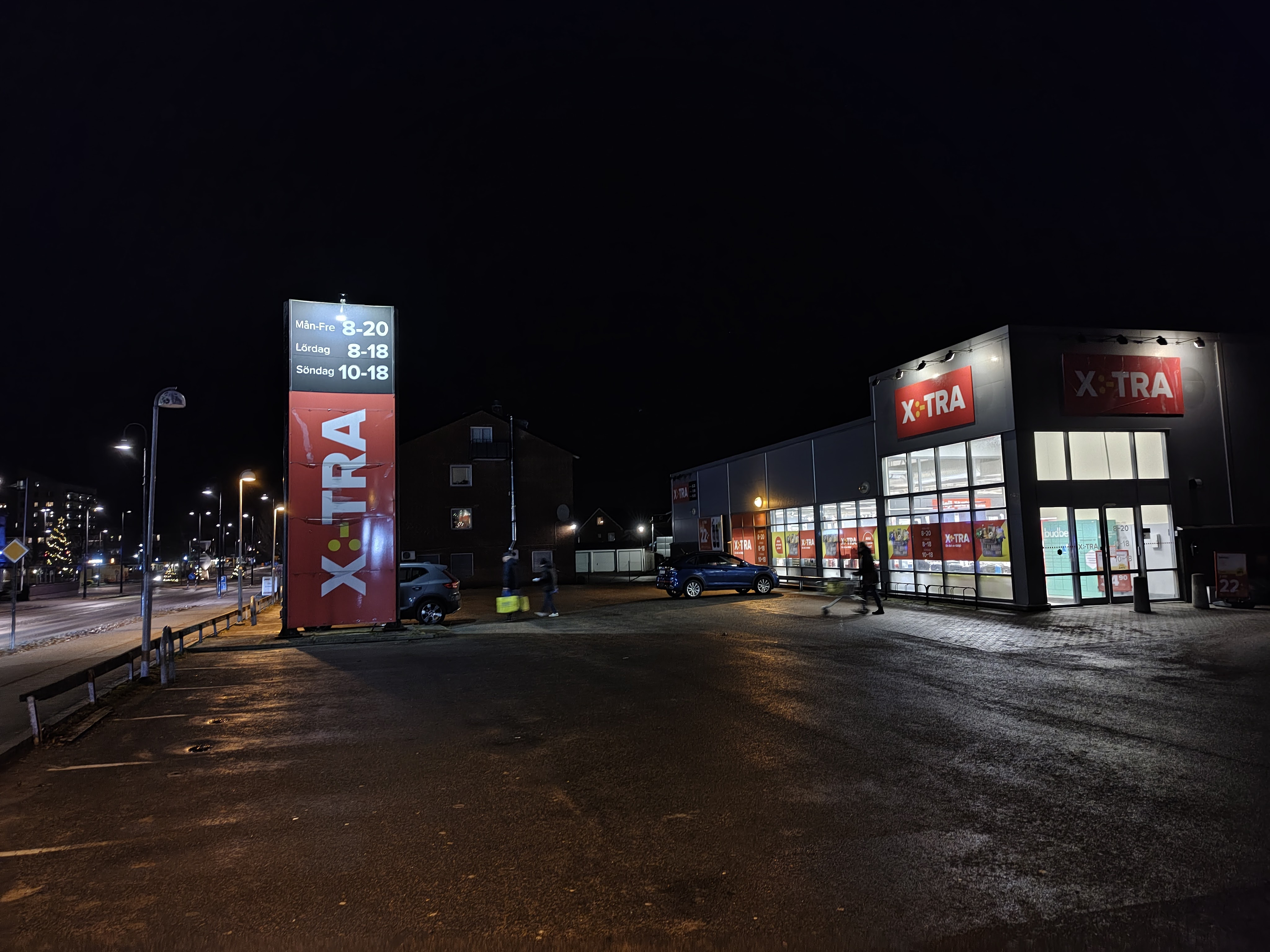
Coop Xtra in Smålandsstenar

X:-tra serves as a brand for discount supermarkets, incorporating some former Netto stores.

=== Former brands ===
==== Lilla Coop ====
Lilla Coop was a short-lived brand for small stores incorporating former Coop Nära stores. The brand disappeared after only 3 years, with stores being converted to the Coop brand starting in 2018.

==== Coop Forum ====
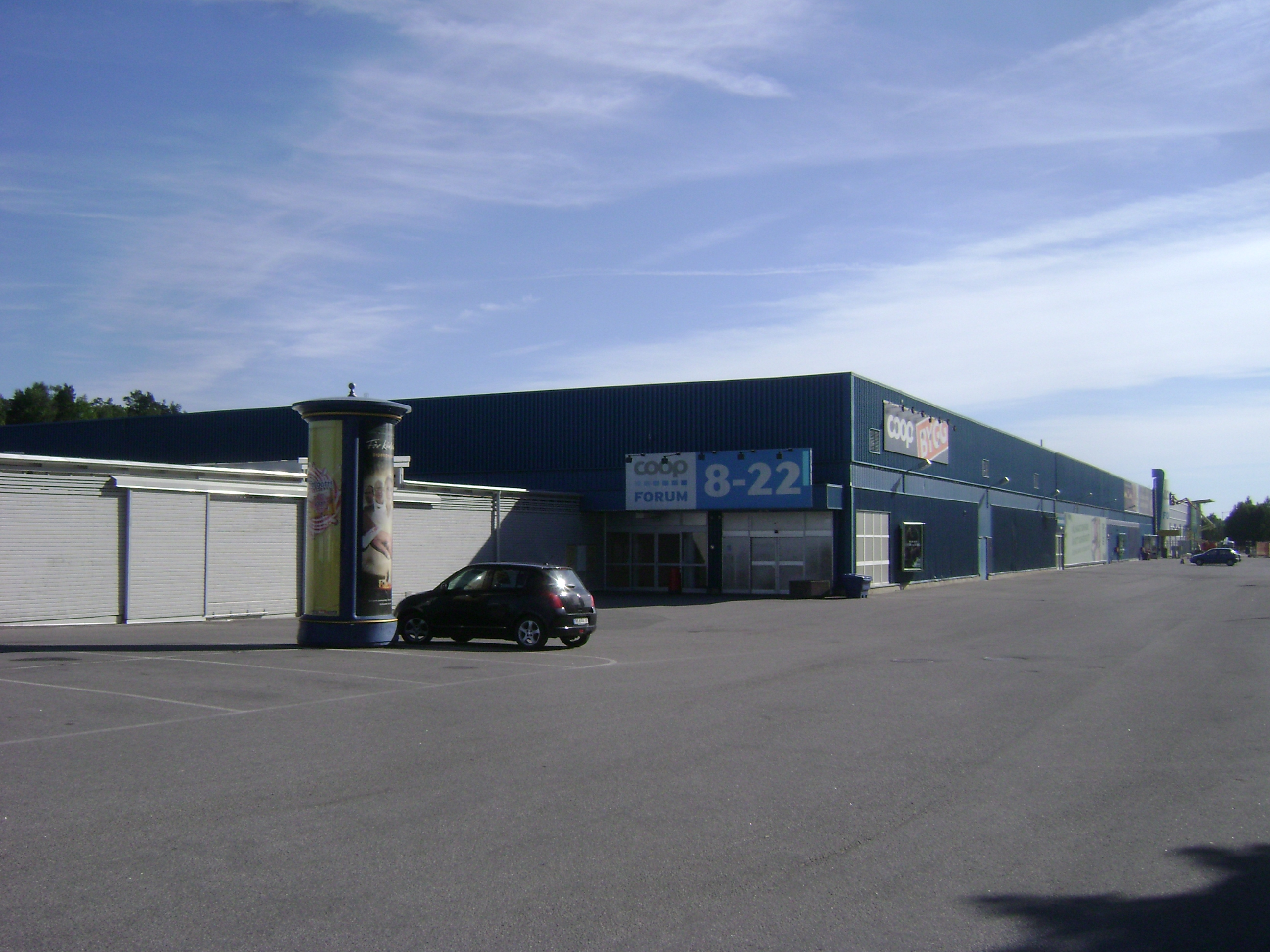
A Coop Forum and Coop Bygg in Haninge

Coop Forum was a brand for hypermarkets. Two stores still retain the Coop Forum brand as of June 2024, though these are planned to rebrand to Stora Coop stores. Many Coop Forum stores were formerly under the B&W, Obs! and Robin Hood brands, which were combined into the new Coop Forum brand in the first years of the 2000s. Some Coop Forum stores also had a larger construction store, branded as Coop Bygg, attached.

==== Coop Nära ====
Coop Nära was a brand for smaller stores, largely being replaced by the Lilla Coop and later Coop brands.

==== Coop Konsum ====
Coop Konsum was a brand for medium-sized stores, largely being replaced by the Coop brand, though two stores remain with the Coop Konsum name as of August 2023.

==== Coop Extra ====
Coop Extra was a brand for larger stores which were still not proper hypermarkets, these stores largely became Coop stores.
