= Anna-Britt Agnsäter =

Swedish home economics teacher (1915–2006)

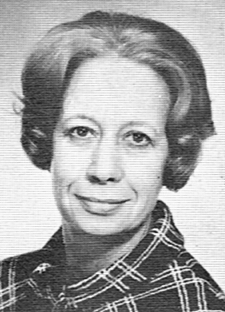
- Born: 27 June 1915; Älmhult Municipality, Sweden
- Died: 13 January 2006 (aged 90); Stockholm, Sweden
- Occupations: Home economics teacher, head of consumer cooperative test kitchen
- Known for: Developing the food pyramid, writing popular cookbooks

Anna-Britt Elisabet Agnsäter (née Johansson; 27 June 1915 – 13 January 2006) was a Swedish home economics teacher and head of the test kitchen for Kooperativa Förbundet, a Swedish consumers' cooperative federation, from 1946 to 1980. She was the author of several popular Swedish cookbooks, including Vår kokbok. Her ambition as the developer of the food pyramid was to improve Sweden's dietary habits; it became widely accepted both in Sweden and internationally.

== Biography ==
Agnsäter was born in Älmhult, Sweden, the daughter of merchant Carl Johansson and Elesine Nilsson. In 1945 she married officer Agne Agnsäter.

Agnsäter attended a girls' school in Ystad and studied at the home economics school in Rimforsa. In the mid-1930s she interned with politician and activist Elisabeth Tamm in Fogelstad. After passing the home economics teaching exam in 1939 she worked at a reformatory outside of Gothenburg. In 1943 she became assistant hemkonsulent, lit. 'home consultant', an advisor on nutrition, finances, and housing issues, in Gothenburg and Bohus County. The following year, she was employed as a traveling home consultant for Kooperativa Förbundet's test kitchen. In 1946, the test kitchen became an independent division, and Agnsäter served as its head until 1980, with the exception of 1948–1949, when she traveled to the United States to study and work for several months.

Agnsäter's trip resulted in new ideas which she brought back to Sweden: upon her return, Agnsäter was the initiator of Kooperativa Förbundet's production of meat thermometers as well as a four-piece measuring cup set adapted for Swedish cooking, now common in Swedish homes.

Agnsäter was the chief editor of 13 editions of Vår kokbok (Our Cookbook), first published in 1951 and Sweden's most popular cookbook. It contained new recipes thoroughly tested by the test kitchen and adapted to the new measuring set. It also included descriptions of how to properly cook with the meat thermometer. Angsäter also wrote Matskolan and Matboken.

Agnsäter played an important role in popular education. She was critical of the television chefs of the time for their liberal use of fat in cooking. Her most important contribution was her 1974 food pyramid. With butter use rising after rationing ended in Sweden, Agnsäter's aim was to teach the Swedish population to eat more healthily and cut back on fat. First published in the magazine Vi, the concept was later exported to a number of countries and adapted to local conditions, including by the US Department of Agriculture in 1984.

Agnsäter died in Stockholm in 2006.

== Awards ==
In 1973 she was awarded the Saint Erik Medal by Stockholm Municipality. In 1993 she was awarded the H. M. The King's Medal and in 1995 the Albin Johansson Medal in gold for meritorious contributions to the Swedish consumers' cooperative.
