= Røra Fabrikker =

Norwegian food processing company

AS Røra Fabrikker
- Type: Subsidiary
- Industry: Food
- Founded: 1938
- Headquarters: Inderøy Municipality, Norway
- Area served: Norway
- Products: Juice & Jam
- Revenue: ▲152 million kr (2003)
- Number of employees: 49 (2011)
- Parent: Coop Norge Industri AS
- Website: www.coop.no/rora

AS Røra Fabrikker (Norwegian: [ʁø̀ːʁa'fɑˈbrɪkːər]) is a Norwegian company that is located in Røra in Inderøy Municipality in Trøndelag county, Norway. It is a juice, jam, and processed agricultural product company that is a subsidiary of Coop Norge Industri AS. Røra Fabrikker, together with a coffee plant and bakery-holding company, form one division of food production within Coop Norge Industri.

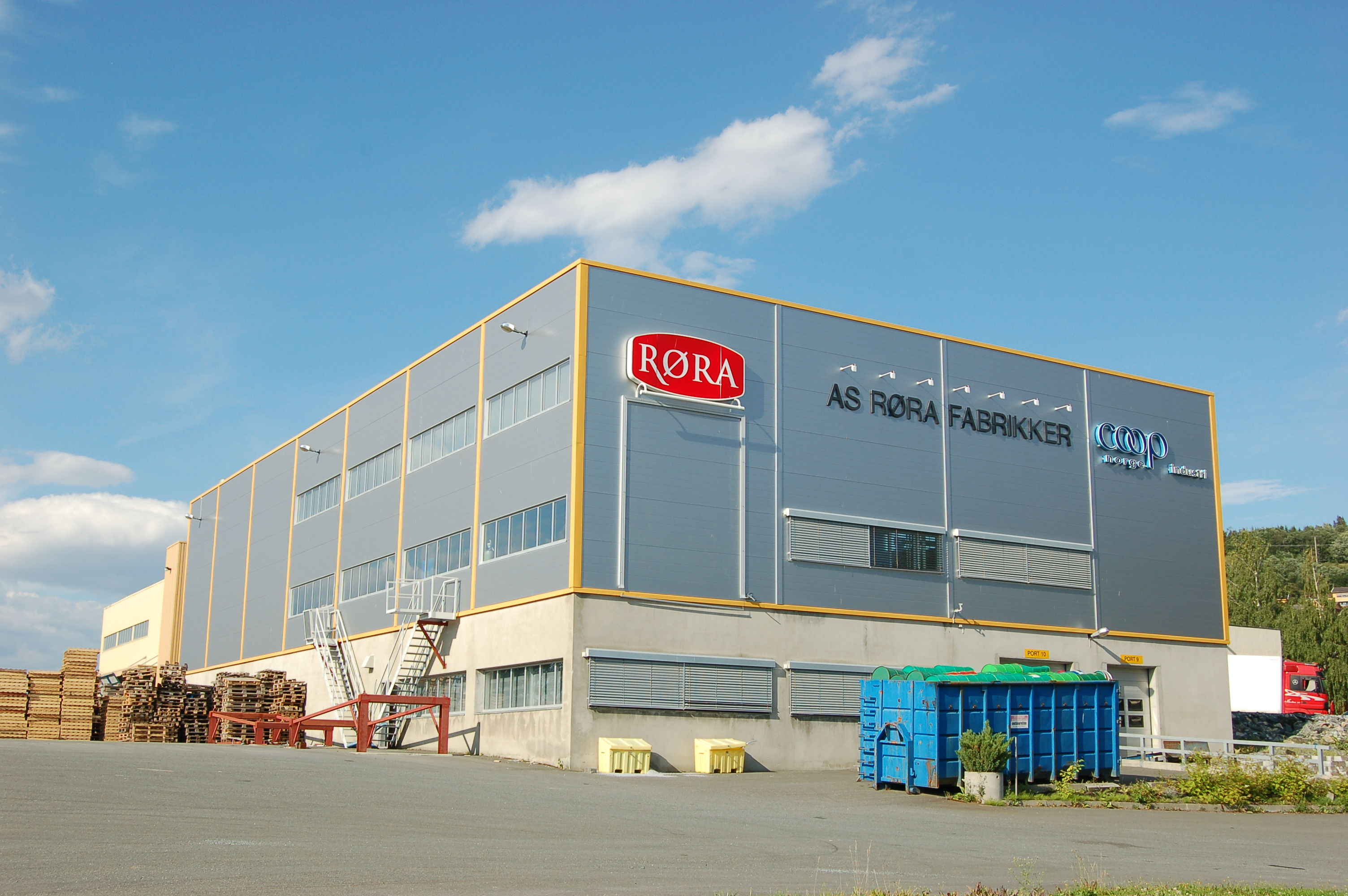

The items produced here are shipped and delivered to cooperatives throughout Norway. There are 49 people employed by the company in 2011. The company was founded in 1938 as the Inntrøndelag Frukt- og Bærsalgslag. The name was later changed to Trøndefrukt and in 1975 it was changed to its present form.
