= ICA Gruppen =

Swedish retail franchise

ICA Gruppen AB (publ)
- Type: Unlisted public Aktiebolag
- Genre: Retailing, banking
- Founded: 1938
- Headquarters: Solna, Greater Stockholm, Sweden
- Area served: Sweden, Latvia, Lithuania and Estonia
- Key people: Nina Jönsson (CEO)
- Revenue: SEK 157 billion €13.7 billion (2024)
- Number of employees: 24,000
- Subsidiaries: ICA Sverige AB; ICA Banken; Apotek Hjärtat AB; ICA Fastigheter AB
- Website: www.icagruppen.se/en/

ICA Gruppen AB (Swedish pronunciation: [ˈîːka]; "ICA Group"), founded as Inköpscentralernas aktiebolag (lit. 'the Purchasing Centres' Corporation'), is a Swedish retailer franchise with a focus on food and health. The group also owns a bank, real estate division and a pharmacy chain. The company was started in 1938, based on a business model which was introduced by Hakonbolagen in 1917. Most of its operations are based in Sweden and the Baltic countries.

The company was owned by the participating retailers until 2000 when half of the company was sold to the Dutch retailer Ahold. It acquired a further 10% in 2004. Ahold is prevented by contractual obligation from exercising majority control over ICA. In February 2013, Ahold sold its shares to Hakon Invest for $3.1bn. In May 2013, the company changed name from Hakon Invest AB to ICA Gruppen AB.

In November 2021, ICA-handlarnas Förbund together with AMF Pensionsförsäkring AB announced a public offer to acquire all shares of ICA Gruppen. In December 2021, they held more than 90% of all shares and the company was delisted from the Nasdaq Stockholm stock exchange on 13 January 2022.

== Sweden ==
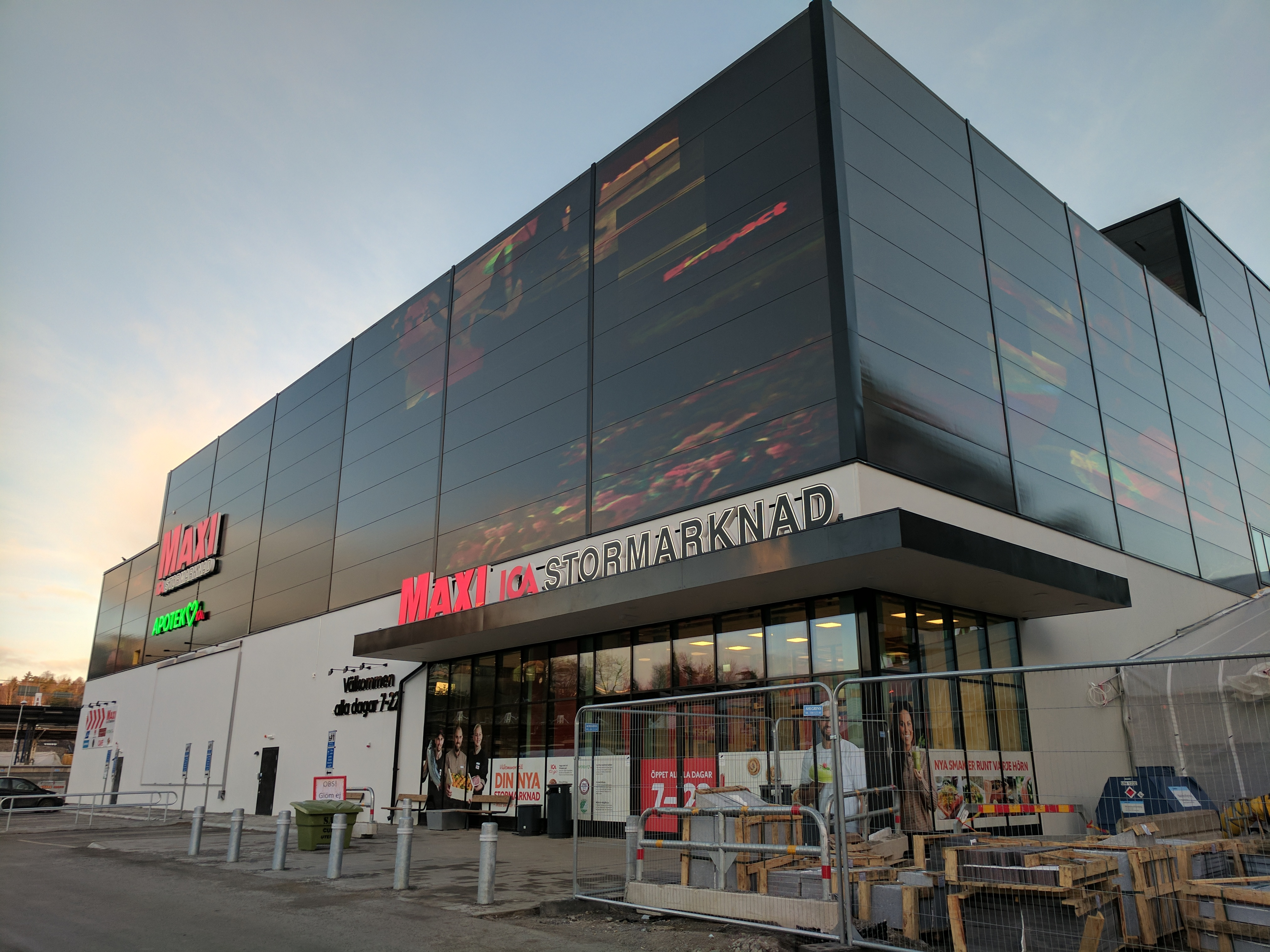
Ica MAXI Hypermarket in Flemingsberg

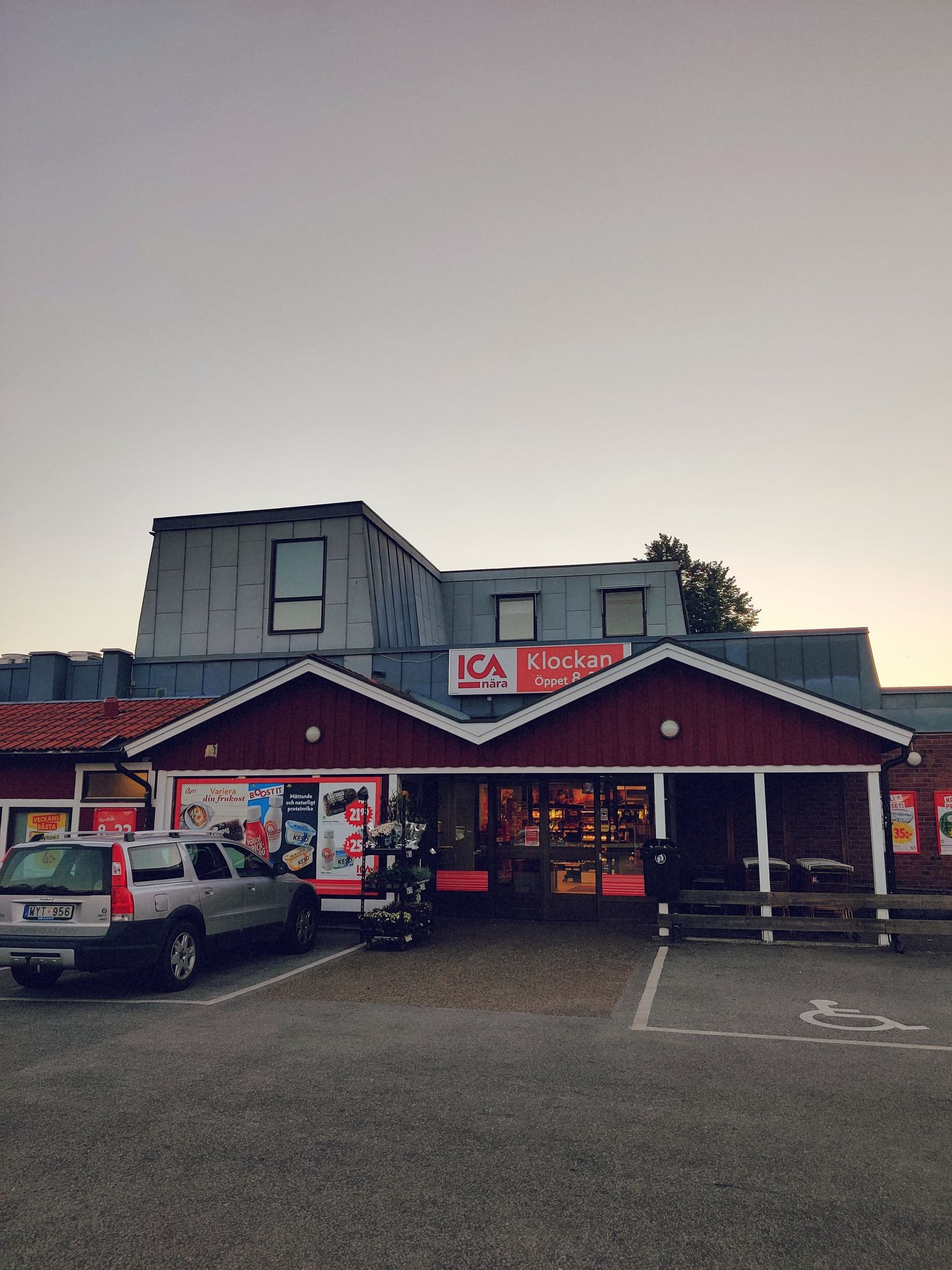
Ica Nära Klockan in Lidköping

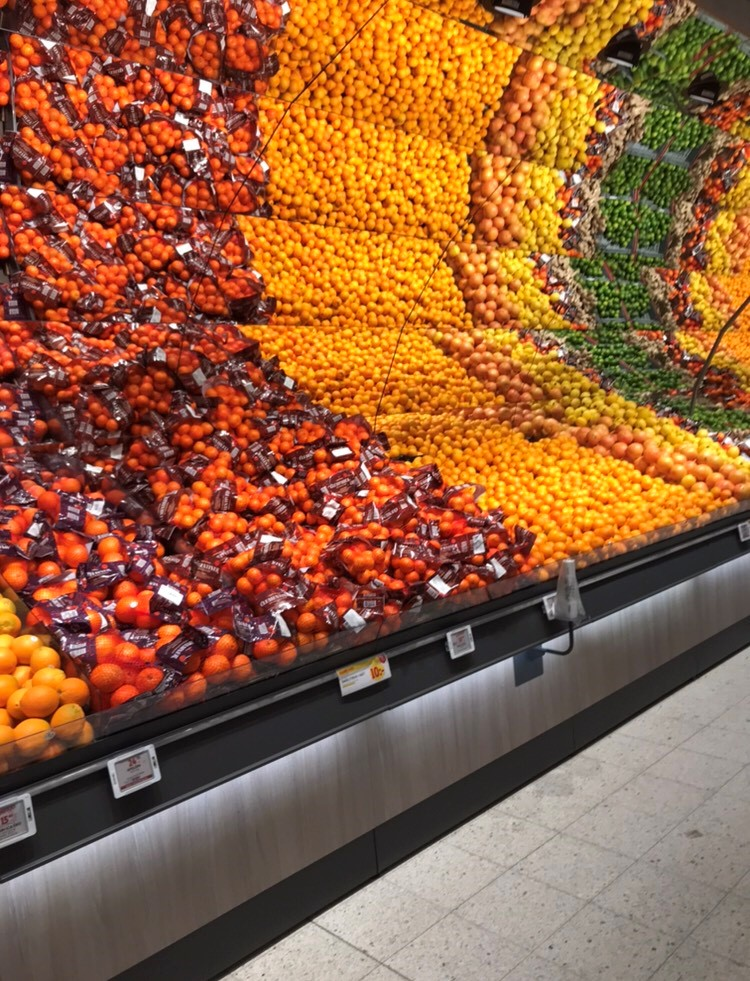
ICA Maxi Lindhagen

In Sweden, ICA Sverige AB operates close to 1,300 retail stores (as of February 2025). The stores have different profiles, depending on location, range of products and size:

- ICA Nära ("ICA Nearby") — Convenience-type stores for daily retail needs.
- ICA Supermarket — Mid-size supermarkets, located near where customers dwell or work or near major roads, carrying a wide range of products.
- ICA Kvantum — Superstores for large, planned purchases. Large spaces allocated for traffic and parking. Typically located outside of the cities.
- MAXI ICA Stormarknad — Hypermarkets with a full range of groceries as well as fashions, homewares, entertainment and consumer electronics. Smaller stores do not offer the fashion and electronics ranges, while the largest stores also have a DIY and gardening department.

Each store is owned and operated separately, but operations are coordinated within the group. All feature ICA brand products. ICA has its two largest logistics centers in Västerås and Helsingborg.

Since December 2001, ICA has run a series of television commercials featuring the staff and customers of a fictional ICA store. As of Mid January 2015 512 commercials have aired. Since 2007 it is listed at the Guinness World Records as the longest running television advertising drama.

In 2021, ICA opened its first automated online groceries warehouse in Brunna, outside Stockholm, to deliver groceries to customers. The warehouse uses technology powered by Ocado Group.

=== ICA meat repackaging controversy ===
In December 2007, a meat repackaging fraud scheme was revealed when a whistleblower spoke to Sveriges Television's flagship investigative programme Uppdrag granskning. Hans Hallén, a former quality control manager for the supermarket chain, revealed that the company was aware that meat was being illegally repackaged as early as 2003. Hallén, who monitored ICA stores in southern Sweden 2003–2005, said he informed the company's managers of the practices. According to Hallén, many stores engaged in practices such as repackaging meat to change the expiry date.

=== ICA Offers ===
ICA Sweden's industries have a large number of stores, and a website, in which weekly offers are available for customers to get discounts on goods purchased online or in physical stores. Many can also offer some extra items specific to the store, depending on their own policy.

== Rimi Baltic ==
ICA's wholly owned subsidiary Rimi Baltic operated supermarkets and hypermarkets across Estonia, Latvia and Lithuania. As of February 2025, Rimi Baltic had about 300 stores in the Baltic countries. In June of 2025 it was sold to Denmarks biggest retailer - Salling Group for 1.3 billion euros.

== Apotek Hjärtat ==
ICA Gruppen owns the pharmacy shop chain Apotek Hjärtat, which ICA acquired in 2015. As of February 2025, Apotek Hjärtat has close to 400 shops in Sweden.

== ICA Bank ==
ICA Bank operates in Sweden and has agency agreements with nearly all ICA stores in the country. The basic idea is to reduce banking costs for the shops own business, offer banking services that build loyalty among ICA's customers, as well as to increase the share of store transactions executed with ICA's own cards instead of more expensive cards from other banks. Sales amounted to about 3 billion SEK in 2024.

== ICA Real Estate ==
ICA Real Estate's mission is to satisfy the ICA Gruppen's need for the right properties in the right locations in Sweden. This is currently done by owning, renting and strategically developing marketplaces. ICA Real Estate has about 200 properties, wholly owned or through joint ventures (as of the 2024 annual report).

== History ==
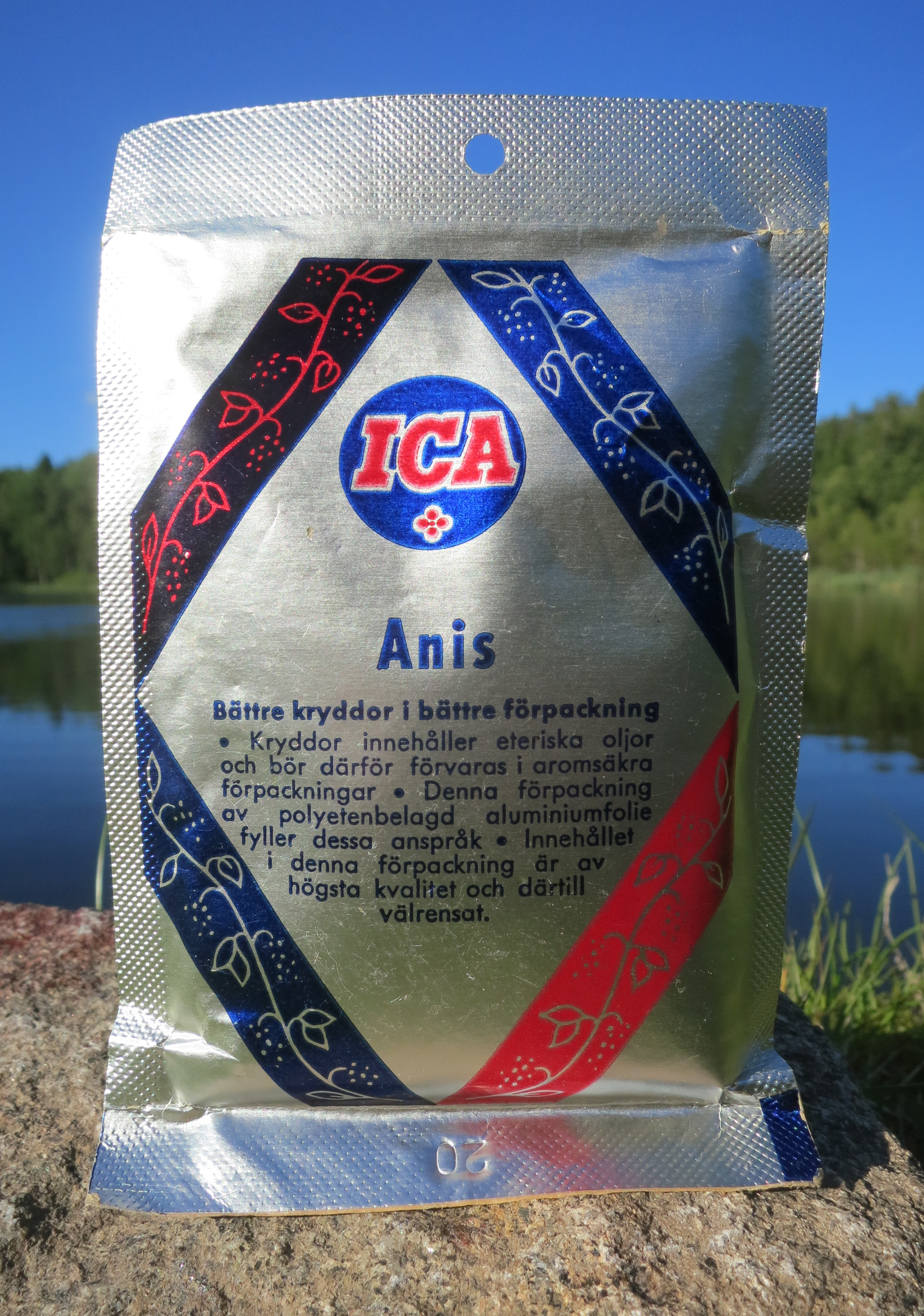
ICA aniseed spice pouch from the early 1970s

=== Statoil ===
Until the mid-1990s, Statoil and ICA jointly operated Statoil Detaljhandel AB (Statoil Retail Ltd) which ran approximately 1,300 petrol stations in Scandinavia, many branded under the name ICA Express. ICA has since sold its 50 percent share of the business back to Statoil and the ICA name was removed from the petrol stations during 2007.

=== Denmark ===
ICA previously had a 50 percent stake in the ISO chain of supermarkets in the Copenhagen region, Denmark. In 2004, ICA sold its entire holding in ISO.

=== Netto Sweden ===
The Swedish operation of Danish supermarket chain Netto was founded in 2002 as a joint venture between Dansk Supermarked and ICA. The joint venture was named Netto Marknad AB. At the end of 2006, ICA announced it was pulling out of the joint venture, reducing its stake from 50 to 5 percent. Twenty-one of the Netto stores in the Stockholm and Västmanland regions were transferred to ICA's ownership and rebranded to ICA's own formats or closed during 2007.

=== Norway ===
ICA Norge AS ran about 600 stores in Norway as of 2009. Store sales were at approximately 21 billion SEK (excluding VAT). Formerly known as Hakongruppen and owned by Stein Erik Hagen, it operated solely RIMI discount stores until ICA bought the chain, and transformed many of the stores to the ICA brand. ICA Norway was divided into four different stores:

- Matkroken
- ICA Nær (closed 2014)
- ICA Supermarked (closed 2015/2016)
- ICA Maxi (closed 2012)
- RIMI (a chain of food stores)

In 2014 ICA Norge was sold to Coop Norge and all stores, except for the Matkroken chain, were rebranded into Coop stores, mainly Coop Extra and Coop Prix. 93 stores had to be sold to competitors due to demands from the Norwegian Competition Authority.

=== Hemtex ===
In 2009, the Swedish home textile retail chain Hemtex became a partly owned subsidiary of ICA Gruppen (Hakon Invest). In 2015, ICA Gruppen acquired the remaining shares of Hemtex and it became a wholly owned subsidiary. In 2019, Hemtex was sold to Norwegian home textile chain Kid ASA.
