= Jørgen Lykke =

Danish nobleman, diplomat and politician (1515–1583)

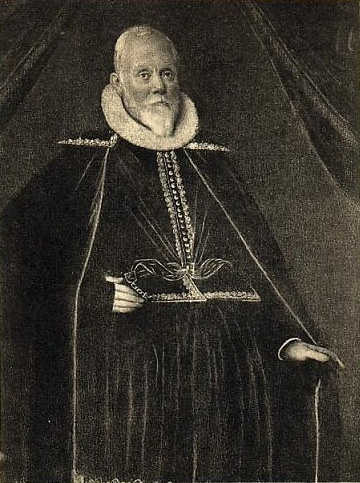
Jørgen Lykke

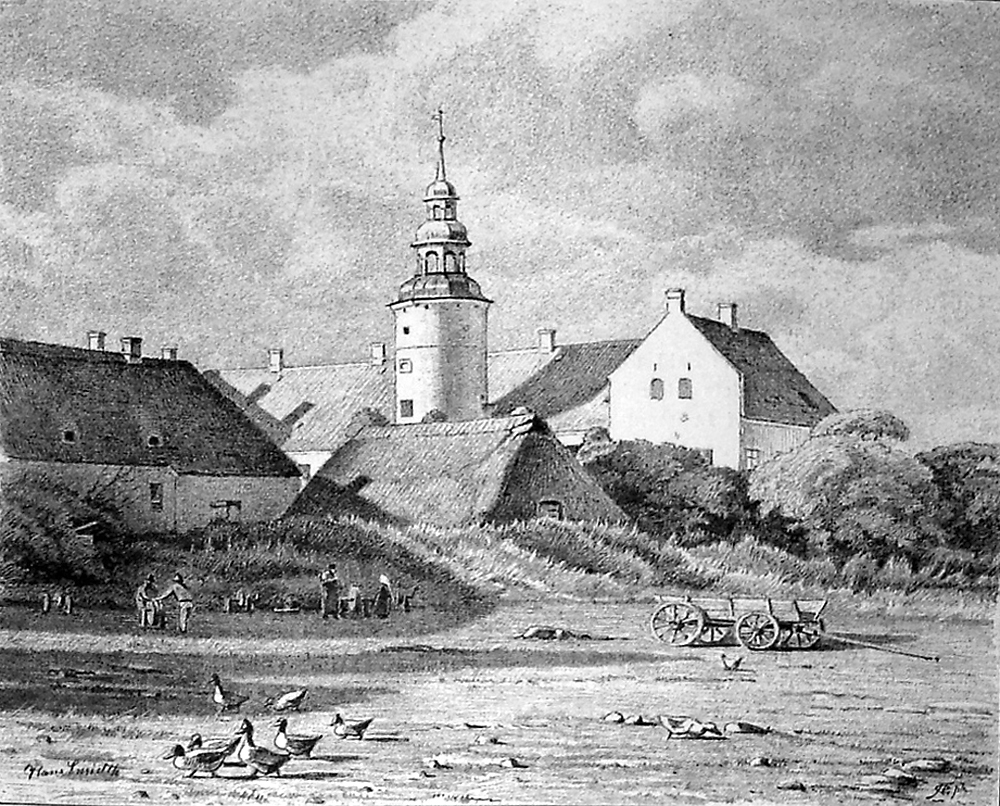
Overgård Manor image by Hans Smidth (1884)

Jørgen Lykke (1515–26 December 1583) was a Danish nobleman, diplomat and politician. He was a member of the Council of the Realm, lord of Overgård Manor and fiefholder in Skanderborg.

== Biography ==
Jørgen Pedersen Lykke was born on Havnø at Hadsund in Jutland, Denmark. He was the son of the National Councilor member (Riksråd) Peder Hansen Lykke (d. 1535) and Kirsten Pedersdatter Høg (d. 1542). He was the brother of estate owner Sophie Lykke (d. 1570), widow of Jacob Hardenberg (d. 1542).

He enter diplomatic service as chief of staff from 1532 to 1543 in the court of King Francis I of France (1494–1547). Returning to Denmark, he served frequently in diplomatic tasks abroad and in commission duties within the country during the Northern Seven Years' War (1563–1570). He was used in a number of other diplomatic missions; 1544 to Sweden, 1551 to Germany and during 1560 and 1561 to France.

== Personal life ==
Jørgen Lykke was married to Beate Axelsdatter Brahe, daughter of steward of Scania, Axel Axelsen Brahe (ca. 1480–1551), and secondly to Beate Aagesdatter Brahe (ca. 1525–1602), daughter of knight and fiefholder Aage Axelsen Brahe, til Tostrup (d. 1525).

During 1550, he built Overgård Manor (Overgård Gods) in the parish of Udbyneder at Mariager Fjord in Jutland.

Jørgen Lykke became a knight of the Order of the Elephant in 1559. He died during 1583 and was interred in Udbyneder Church (Udbyneder Kirke) at Mariager in Jutland.

== Other sources ==
- Thit Jensen (2016) Jørgen Lykke (Lindhardt og Ringhof) ISBN 9788711522776
