= Coop Marked =

Norwegian local grocery store chain

- Company type: Grocery store
- Headquarters: Oslo Municipality
- Number of locations: 100
- Area served: Norway
- Owner: Coop Norge
- Website: www.coop.no/marked

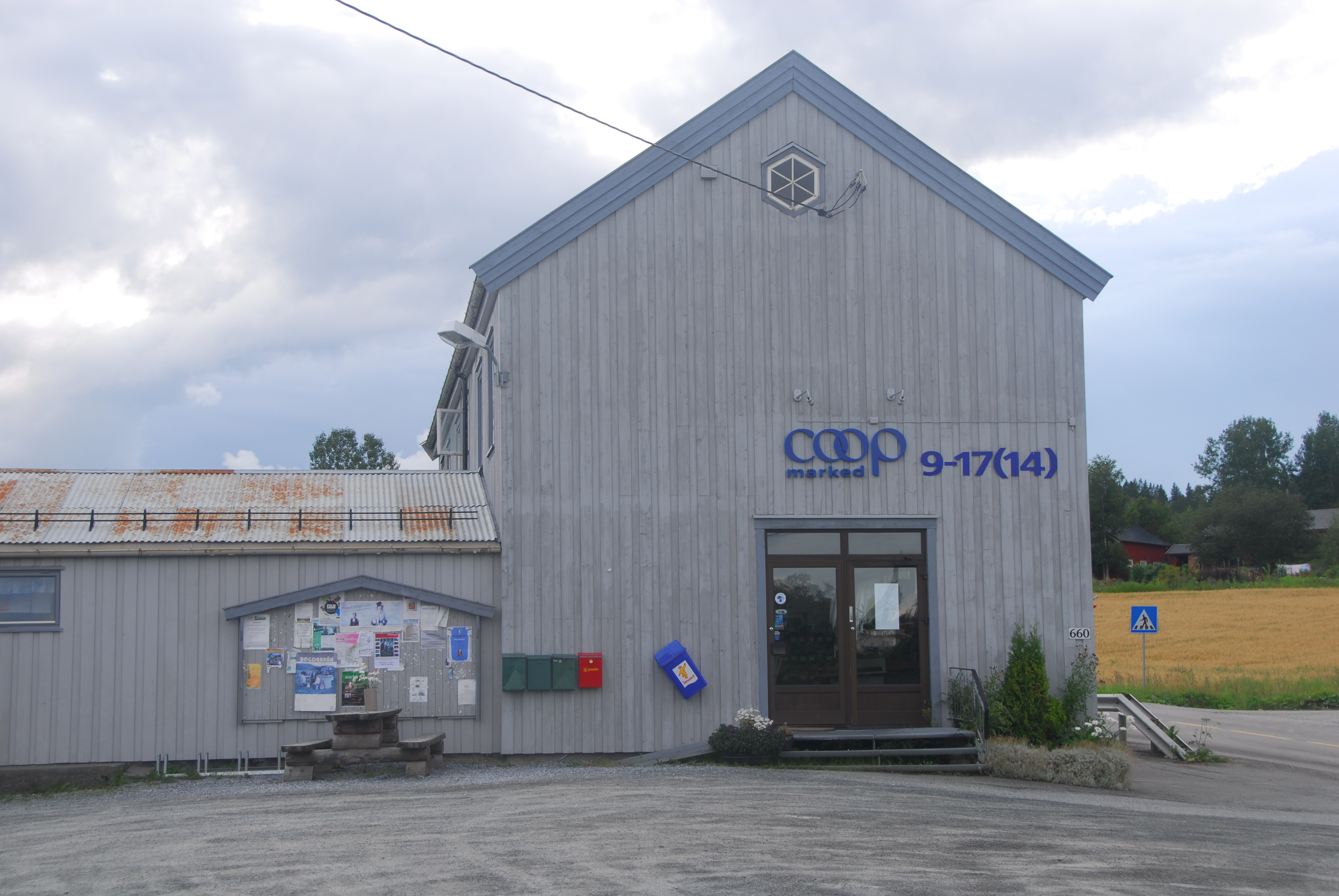
A Coop Market store at Utøy

Coop Marked is a chain of 100 (not including Matkroken) local grocery stores throughout Norway managed by Coop Norge and owned by local cooperatives. The chain represents the smallest stores in the Coop range, and is predominantly used in rural areas too small to support Coop Prix stores.

Coop Marked was established as Samvirke Butikk (S-Butikk), Samvirke Marked (S-Marked), Samvirkelaget (S-Lag), Samvirke Nærkjøp (S-Nær) and Samvirkelaget Varehus (S-Varehus) in 1950. In 1990, the graphic profile was updated so that all stores were rebranded as S-Butikken, S-Marked, S-Nærkjøp and S-Varehus, which lasted until the rebranding in 2001 to Coop Marked.
