= Sophie Lykke =

Danish noblewoman (died 1570)

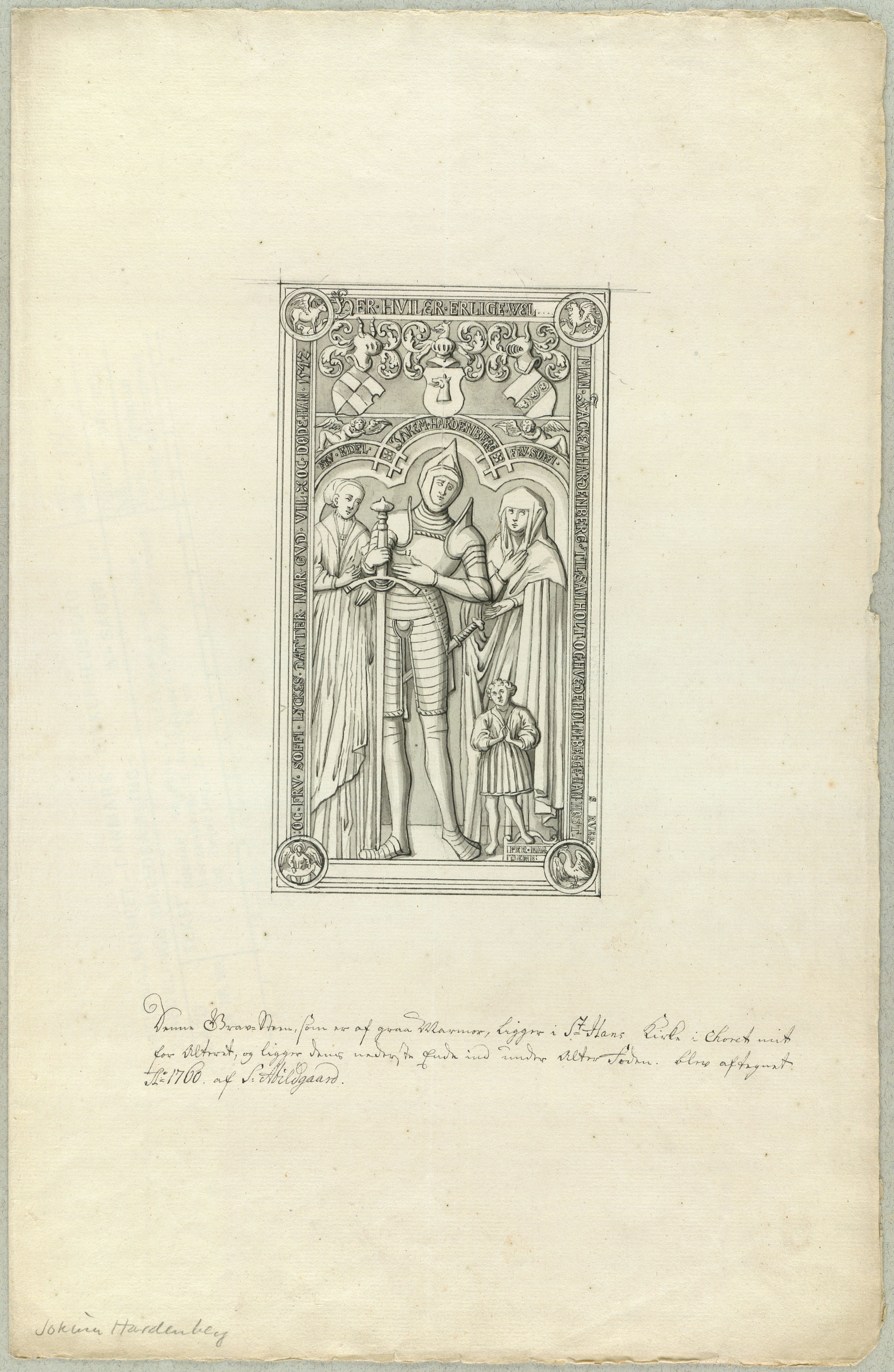
Sophie Lykke seen on her husband's ledgerstone in St. John's Church in Odense. The other woman is Edel Bille, Hardenberg's first wife. Drawing by Søren Abildgaard, 1760.

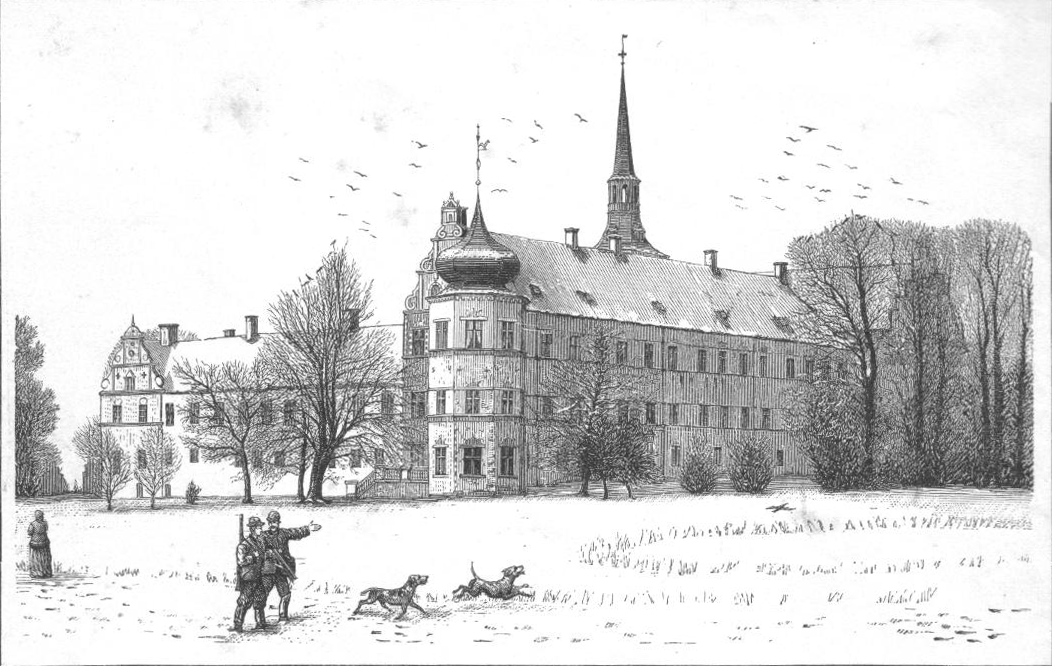
Holme Kloster

Sophie Lykke (died 1570) was a Danish county administrator, landholder and noble.

== Biography ==
Sophie Lykke was the daughter of Councilor member (Riksråd) Peder Hansen Lykke (d. 1535) and Kirsten Pedersdatter Høg (d. 1542). Her brother was nobleman and diplomat Jørgen Lykke (1515–1583). She was married in 1534 to Councilor member Jacob Hardenberg (ca. 1470-1542).

As a widow, she managed the large estates left to her by her spouse as well as estates Hvedholm, Sandholt and Arreskov of her three minor aged daughters, Edel, Anne and Helvig. She was known for her many conflicts with the law; in 1544, she was sued by the peasants for abuse of power but it was retracted after she threatened the witnesses; in 1556 she was sued for having broken the laws of import and export; in 1568, the estate Holme Kloster (later known as Brahetrolleborg) on the island of Fyn was confiscated by the crown and granted to Henrik Rantzau (1526–1599), Governor of the Duchy of Holstein.

She was forced to grant her estates to her sons-in-law in exchange for an annual annuity. When the annuity was not paid, she sued in 1560. King Frederik II subsequently mediated a settlement between the parties. The monarch granted her administration of Lister (now part of Vest-Agder) in Norway. After having been charged with abuse of power as administrator and for breaking the law of lumber export, she was deposed as county administrator in 1563. However, her position was restored the same year due to her family connections. Her three daughters all were married to nobles: Frants Bille til Søholm, Erik Rud til Fuglsang and Erik Ottesen Rosenkrantz til Valsø. In addition, she was also the sister-in-law of Royal Marshal Otte Krumpen (1473–1569) who had married her sister Anne Lykke.
