= Ivan Lykke =

Danish footballer (born 1946)

Personal information
- Full name: Ivan Lykke Henriksen
- Date of birth: 8 October 1946 (age 80)
- Place of birth: Nørre Vedby, Denmark
- Position: Goalkeeper

Senior career*
| Years | Team | Apps | (Gls) |
| 1970–1975 | B.1901 Nykøbing | | |
| 1979–1980 | Fremad Amager | | |

International career
| 1975 | Denmark | 2 | (0) |
- * Club domestic league appearances and goals

Ivan Lykke Henriksen (born 8 October 1946) is a Danish former footballer who played as a goalkeeper for B.1901 Nykøbing and Fremad Amager. He made two appearances for the Denmark national in 1975.
