= Trond Lykke =

Norwegian merchant (1946–2020)

- Born: 3 February 1946; Trondheim, Norway
- Died: 17 November 2020 (aged 74)
- Occupation: Merchant
- Relatives: Ivar Lykke (grandfather)

Trond Lykke (3 February 1946 – 17 November 2020) was a Norwegian merchant.

== Career ==
Lykke was born in Trondheim, a grandson of merchant and prime minister Ivar Lykke. He was manager of the family merchandise I. K. Lykke from 1978 to 2005 (when his son Christian Lykke took over), and chairman of the board from 1985. In 1981 he established the retail chain, Bunnpris.

Lykke was adopted into the Royal Norwegian Society of Sciences and Letters in 1998. From 2005 he was Danish consul in Trondheim.

He died on 17 November 2020.
