= Kooperativa Förbundet =

Swedish consumer cooperative

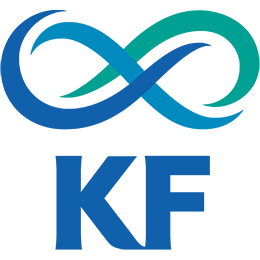
- Type: Cooperative Federation
- Industry: Retail
- Founded: 1899
- Headquarters: Solna, Stockholm, Sweden
- Area served: Sweden
- Key people: Johnny Capor, CFO; Anders Sundström, Chairperson
- Members: 3.2 million
- Website: kf.se

KF (Swedish: Kooperativa Förbundet, "Co-operative Union") is a federation of consumer co-operatives in Sweden and a retail group, with groceries as its core business. Their grocery store brands include Coop, Stora Coop and, formerly, Lilla Coop, which was retired in 2018.

== History ==
KF was founded in 1899 by 41 local consumer co-operatives in order to support them with information and education of store managers and board members. Soon KF also became responsible for common procurement of goods. In the 1930s, KF expanded rapidly during the management of Albin Johansson, setting up various industries in order to support the co-operative grocery stores. From 1950 to 1970, KF was at the forefront of the Swedish retail trade by developing new and bigger store formats and it was one of the major business groups in Scandinavia. In the beginning of the 1990s, as a response to a financial crisis, KF decided to sell out all its industries and focus on retail trade only.

Around the year 2000, KF formed the retail chain Coop Norden along with its Nordic co-operative counterparts, Danish FDB and Norwegian Coop NKL. In 2002, KF bought a 50% share in BOL Sweden from Bertelsmann. Due to poor financial results in Coop Norden, the owners decided to renationalize the operation of the stores in 2007. In July 2021, Coop was temporarily shut down by a ransomware attack on Kaseya software services.

== Today ==
As of 2012, KF is a federation of 39 consumer co-operatives with more than 3.2 million members and a retail group with a net worth (ex. VAT) of SEK 37.3 billion. The grocery retail group, Coop Butiker & Stormarknader, stands for around 85 per cent of the sale with store brands like Coop Konsum, Coop Nära, Coop Extra, Stora Coop and Coop Forum. KF accounts for approximately 55 percent of consumer cooperative retail sales in Sweden. The other part is run by local or regional retail cooperatives, even though procurement, logistics and store brands are integrated. Together, KF and the consumer co-operatives have a market share of 21.5 per cent of the Swedish grocery retail trade (2010).

== See also ==
- List of food cooperatives
- Anna-Britt Agnsäter – former head of the cooperative's test kitchen and inventor of the food pyramid
- Inger Thorén - Chemical engineer and food chemist, cereal chemist at KF's bakery laboratory between 1953 and 1957.
