= Extra (Coop) =

Norwegian discount supermarket chain

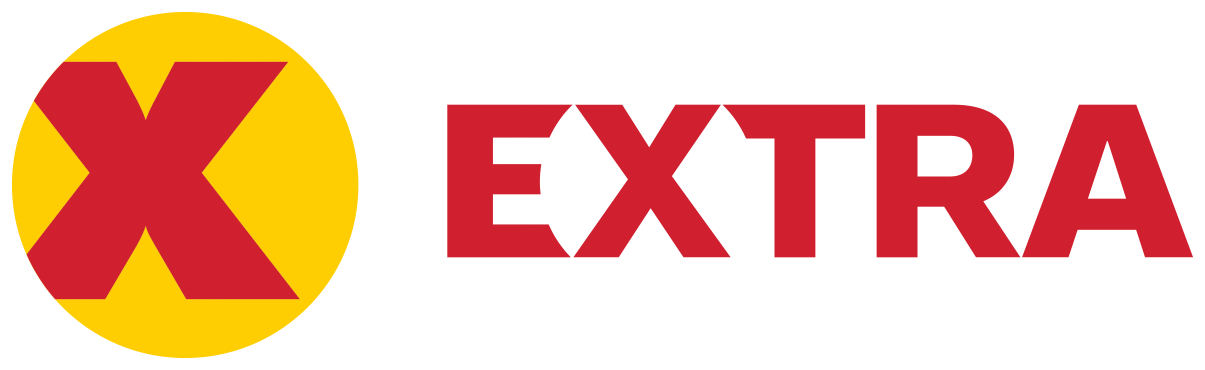
- Company type: Supermarket
- Number of locations: 574
- Area served: Norway
- Owner: Coop Norge
- Website: https://coop.no/extra/

Extra is a Norwegian discount supermarket chain of 574 stores as of 2024. It is part of the Coop Norge cooperative and was until late 2015 named Coop Extra. The chain markets itself as being low-cost while maintaining large stores with a wide selection of items. The chain director of Extra is Daniel Kyrre Pedersen.

Coop Extra was established in 2006, with its first store opening on 15 September in Halden. The chain expanded rapidly, much of it by rebranding other Coop stores such as Coop Prix. Many Rimi and ICA stores were rebranded to Extra in 2015 when Coop Norge bought up most of ICA AB's Norwegian operations.

The chain competes mainly on offering lower prices. A price test by VG in 2015 found Extra to be the cheapest chain in Norway overall, albeit only trivially less than REMA 1000. The chain has its own low price brand, called Xtra, which always is the cheapest alternative.

In 2023 the chain had 17.3% of the grocery store market share in Norway.
