= Coop Mega =

Norwegian supermarket chain

- Company type: Supermarket
- Headquarters: Oslo Municipality
- Area served: Norway
- Owner: Coop Norge
- Website: http://www.coop.no/mega

Coop Mega is a chain of supermarket stores throughout Norway managed by Coop Norge and owned by local cooperatives. The chain director is Stian Enbom Lysaker.

The chain brand was established by the cooperative NKL in 1987 as a refurbishment of Domus. The first outlet was located at Bekkestua.

In 2023 the chain held a 3.1% market share in grocery retail in Norway.

As of 2021 the chain had a turnover of 7 247 million NOK and as of 20 May 2024 the chain has 66 shops.
