= Obs (Coop) =

Norwegian hypermarket chain

- Company type: Hypermarket
- Industry: Other business support service activities n.e.c.
- Number of locations: 31
- Area served: Norway
- Owner: Coop Norge
- Website: www.obs.no

Obs is a chain of 31 hypermarkets throughout Norway managed by Coop Norge and owned by local cooperatives. The chain director is Lars Midttun.

== History ==
The first hypermarket opened in Trondheim in 1968 under the name DOMUS Stormarked.

Before 2001, the stores were only branded as Obs! Stormarked, from 2001 to 2006 as Coop obs!, from 2006 to 2016 as Coop obs! Hypermarked and again from 2016 as Obs.

Some of the Obs stores have Obs BYGG construction and hardware stores.

== List of stores ==
As of 2024, there are 31 Obs hypermarkets in Norway:

- Obs Alnabru
- Obs Arendal
- Obs Bodø
- Obs Bryne
- Obs Buskerud
- Obs City Lade
- Obs City Syd
- Obs Elverum
- Obs Harstad
- Obs Haugenstua
- Obs Haugesund
- Obs Horisont
- Obs Jessheim
- Obs Kvadrat
- Obs Lagunen
- Obs Lillestrøm
- Obs Lyngdal
- Obs Mariero
- Obs Mo i rana
- Obs Olrud
- Obs Ruhøgda
- Obs Rygge
- Obs Sandefjord
- Obs Sartor
- Obs Slitu
- Obs Steinkjer
- Obs Stormoa
- Obs Sørlandssenteret
- Obs Tromsø
- Obs Vestkanten
- Obs Vinterbro
