= Coop Norge =

Norwegian retail cooperative

Coop Norge SA
- Type: Cooperative
- Industry: Retail
- Founded: 1906 (NKL); 2000 (Coop NKL); 2001 (Coop Norden AB); 2007 (Coop Norge SA)
- Headquarters: Oslo, Norway
- Area served: Norway
- Key people: Philipp Engedal (Adm. Director)
- Revenue: NOK 30.041 billion
- Operating income: NOK 401 million
- Net income: NOK 243 million
- Total assets: NOK 13.845 billion
- Number of employees: 2,564
- Subsidiaries: Coop Norge Eiendom AS; Norsk Butikkdrift AS
- Website: coop.no

Coop Norge is a Norwegian cooperative. It is owned by 117 local cooperatives with approximately 2 million members. The company has its headquarters in Oslo.

== History ==
The first cooperative store in Norway was opened in the 1850s and, on 27 June 1906, a group of 28 cooperatives formed the NKL (Norges Kooperative Landsforening, "Norwegian Cooperative Association") to act as a wholesaler for its members. The next year, it joined the International Co-operative Alliance.

NKL acquired the Norwegian Margarine Factory (Margarinfabrikken Norge) in Bergen in 1911; it later purchased other margarine factories in Oslo and Bodø. It purchased a cigarette factory in 1914 and a coffee plant in 1916. During the 1920s, it began production of shoes and flour; during the 1930s, it added chocolate and light bulbs as well as Cooperative Insurance (Samvirke Forsikring). NKL opened the first self-serve store in Norway on 1 October 1947 and, in 1951, the law was changed to permit cooperatives to open branch stores and to sell goods to non-members. In the 1950s, its Tormolux division produced washing machines and mopeds; in the 1960s, it began use of the S brand and opened the warehouse chain Domus. Obs! was established as a separate chain in 1975, and the next year NKL purchased Røra Fabrikker, an Inderøy-based producer of jams and juices. Prix was introduced in 1990.

In 2000, NKL rebranded itself as Coop NKL. In 2001, in collaboration with Sweden's KF and Denmark's FDB, it established Coop Norden AB and rebranded its own operations as Coop NKL. Coop Norden was dissolved in 2008 and Coop NKL resumed control of its outlets in Norway as Coop Norge SA.

== Membership ==
Members of Coop belong to one or more of the local cooperatives. Each member must make a cash deposit of NOK 100–300. The deposit and some interest is redeemable upon cancellation of the membership. The local cooperatives operate the association's stores and are led by boards elected by the membership. Dividends are paid out based on a percentage of the amount purchased.

== Operations ==
Coop stores include the following divisions:

- Obs, hypermarkets
- Coop Mega, supermarkets
- EXTRA, discount supermarket
- Coop Prix, supermarkets
- Coop Marked, rural stores
- Matkroken, rural stores
- Coop Kjøkken og Hjem, kitchen and home supplies
- Coop Elektro, electronics stores
- Coop Byggmix, hardware stores
- Obs BYGG, hardware stores

== Subsidiaries ==
Coop Norge wholly owns Coop Norge Handel AS, its production and trade company; Coop Norge Eiendom AS, its real estate management company; and Smart Club AS, a separate retail chain.

=== Coop Norge Handel ===
Coop Norge Handel AS ("Norwegian Coop Trading Co.") controls Coop's production and trading operations. Its wholly owned subsidiaries include Coop Norge Industri AS and four property companies. It has stakes in a potato-packing plant in Grinder, Takecargo AS in Lysaker, and John Weydahl AS and the Grocery Supplier's Environmental Forum in Oslo. It also has stakes in Coop Trading A/S and NAF Trading A/S in Denmark and Coop Norden Bygg Inköp AB, a construction supply firm, in Sweden.

=== Coop Norge Industri ===
Coop Norge Industri's subsidiaries include Coop Norge Kaffe AS, AS Margarinfabrikken Norge, and Smart Club Gourmet AS in Oslo; Røra Fabrikker in Inderøy; and Gomanbakeren Holding AS in Sandnes, which operates subsidiary bakeries around Norway. Brands produced by Coop Norge Industri or its subsidiaries include "Coop"-brand coffee, "Goman" baked goods, "X-tra" discount items, "Røra" fruit products, "Änglamark"-brand organic food, and "Kellen" hardware.

=== Coop Norge Eiendom ===
Coop Norge Eiendom AS ("Norwegian Coop Property Co.") controls Coop's real estate holdings and investments. Its wholly or partly owned subsidiaries include many properties in Moss, Kristiansund, Surnadalsøra, and Gran, as well as others in Oslo, Bergen, Hammerfest, Tromsø, Lillehammer, and many smaller towns.

=== Smart Club ===
Smart Club AS was a formerly independent chain which was purchased by Coop Norge in August 2008. The operations were folded into Coop's existing brands.

== See also ==
- Coop Norden, Coop's former parent company
  - Coop Danmark, its former sister company in Denmark
- List of the largest Norwegian companies
