= Coop Prix =

Norwegian discount store chain

- Company type: Discount store
- Founded: 1984
- Headquarters: Oslo Municipality
- Number of locations: 257 (as of 13th of April 2024)
- Area served: Norway
- Owner: Coop Norge
- Website: coop.no/coop-prix/

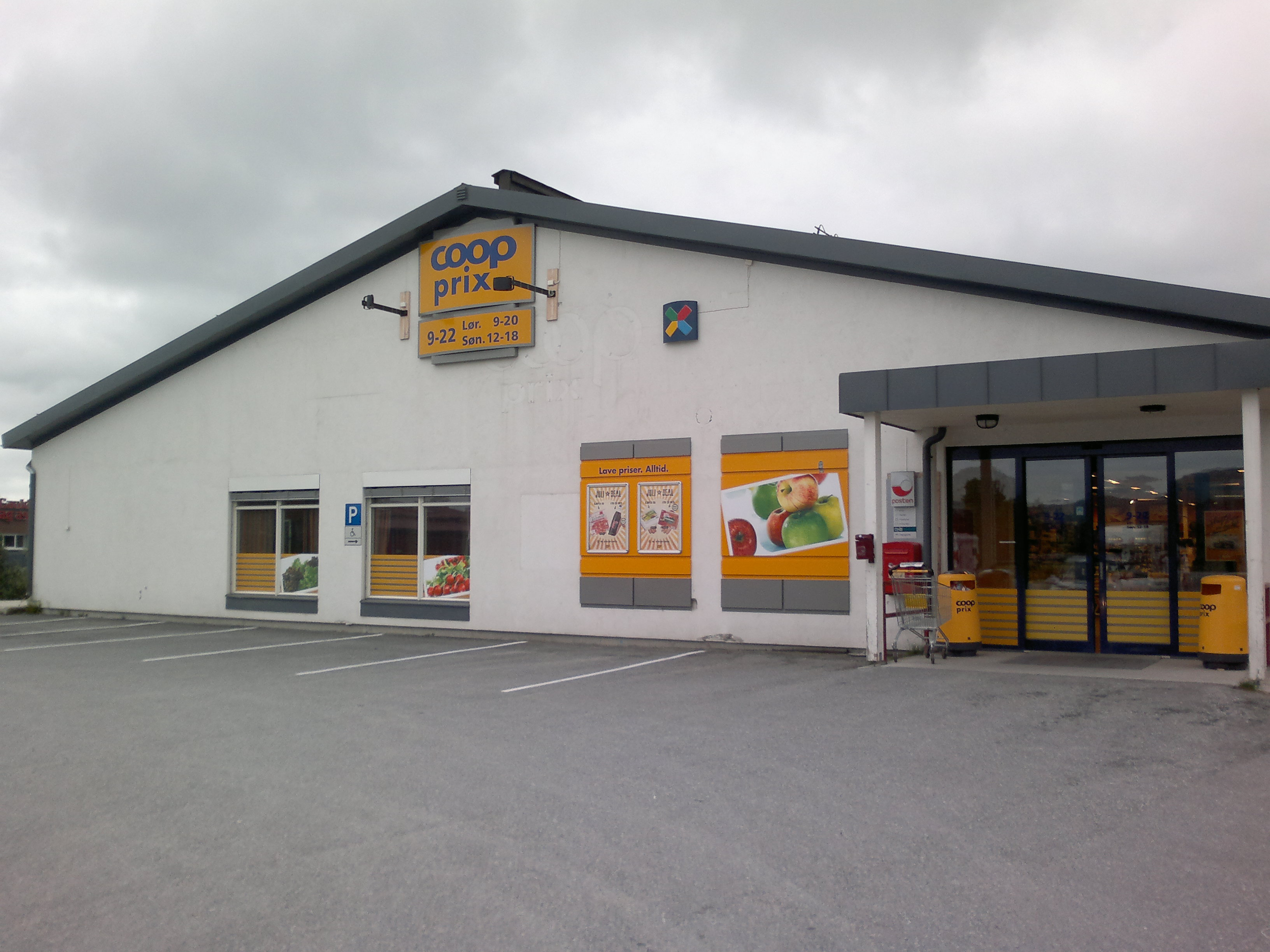
Coop Prix store in Røros

Coop Prix is a Norwegian chain of 257 discount stores throughout Norway managed by Coop Norge and owned by local cooperatives. The chain was created in 1984 under the name PRIX. The chain director is Ingjerd Vestengen.

The chain markets itself with the slogan "Fort gjort!", meaning "quickly done" in English.

In 2020 the chain had a turnover of 7 399 million NOK.
