= List of supermarket chains in Denmark =

This is a list of supermarket chains in Denmark.

Norwegian NorgesGruppen owns a 49% stake in Dagrofa.

== Supermarkets ==
The following table contains summarising information about the supermarket chains that operate in Denmark as of November 2023.

Name	Stores	Type of store	Parent
SPAR	>130	convenience	Dagrofa
Min Købmand	>160	convenience	Dagrofa
Meny	111	full service	Dagrofa
7-Eleven	ca.200	convenience	Reitan Group
Netto	514	discount	Salling Group
Kvickly	65	full service	Coop Danmark
Bilka	19	hypermarket	Salling Group
Dagli'Brugsen	ca. 300		Coop Danmark
SuperBrugsen	235		Coop Danmark
Coop 365discount/Fakta	>350	discount	Coop Danmark
føtex, føtex food	107	full service, convenience	Salling Group
Lidl	130	discount	Lidl Stiftung & Co. KG
Let-Køb	102		Dagrofa
Løvbjerg	19	discount	Løvbjerg Supermarket A/S
REMA 1000	>350	discount	Reitan Group
ABC Lavpris	15	discount	ABC Lavpris APS
Liva Stormarked	2	discount	Liva Stormarked

=== Defunct supermarkets ===
- Aldi
- Brugsen
- Eurospar
- Iso (supermarket)
- Irma
- Kiwi
- SuperBest
- LokalBrugsen
- Fakta (by end of 2022)
