= List of shopping malls in Denmark =

This is a list of shopping centres in Denmark:

== Copenhagen and suburbs ==
- Field's, Ørestad (opened in 2004, 145 stores, 115.000 m^{2}, turnover 2006: DKK 2.2 bil.)
- Fisketorvet, Copenhagen (opened in 2000, 120 stores, 55.000 m^{2}, turnover 2006: 1.36 bil.)
- Lyngby Storcenter, Lyngby (opened in 1973, 114 stores, 34.100 m^{2}, turnover 2006: DKK 1.738 bil.)
- City 2, Tåstrup (opened in 1975, 111 stores, 100.000 m^{2}, turnover 2006: DKK 1.5 bil.)
- Rødovre Centrum, Rødovre (opened in 1966 (first shopping mall in Denmark), 105 stores, 65.140 m^{2}, turnover 2006: DKK 1.437 bil.)
- Frederiksberg Centret, Frederiksberg (opened in 1996, 90 stores, 30.000 m^{2})
- Waves, Hundige (opened in 1974, 85 stores, 28.400 m^{2}, turnover 2006: DKK 1.75 bil.)
- Amager Centret, Amager (opened in 1975, 67 stores, 16.000 m^{2})
- Ballerup Centret, Ballerup (opened in 1973, 66 stores, 30.690 m^{2})
- Hørsholm Midtpunkt, Hørsholm (65 stores)
- Spinderiet, Valby (opened in 2007, 50–60 stores, 18.000 m^{2})
- Glostrup Storcenter, Glostrup (opened in 1972, 50 stores, 25.000 m^{2})
- Copenhagen Airport shopping Center, Kastrup (49 stores)
- Hvidovre C (Hvidovre Stationscenter), Hvidovre (43 stores, 10.000 m^{2})
- Ishøj Bycenter, Ishøj (opened in 1977, 40 stores, 20.000 m^{2})
- Waterfront, Hellerup (opened in 2007, 35 stores, 16.000 m^{2})
- Frihedens Butikscenter, Hvidovre (32 stores)
- Copenhagen Central Station Shopping Centre, Vesterbro, Copenhagen (opened 1994, 31 stores)
- Nørrebro Bycenter, Nørrebro (opened in 1995, 22 stores, 11.000 m^{2})
- Farup bytorv, Farum (opened in 1978, 40 stores, 14.700 m^{2})
- Galleri K

== Århus and suburbs ==
- Bazar vest, Brabrand (110 stores, 16.000m²)
- Bruun's Galleri, Århus (opened in 2003, 97 stores, 90.000 m^{2}) combined 103 stores 140,000 m^{2})
- City Vest, Århus V (opened in 1972, 65 stores, 45.000 m^{2})
- Storcenter Nord, Århus N (65 stores) 40.000 m^{2})
- Viby Centret, Viby (32 stores, 20.000 m^{2})
- Veri Center, Risskov (32 stores, 18.000 m^{2})
- Skejby Centret, Skejby (29 stores, 8.138 m^{2})
- Center Syd, Tranbjerg (22 stores, 7.000 m^{2})
- Hørning butikscenter, Hørning (18 stores)
- Clemens, Århus (17 stores, 10.000 m^{2})
- Center Øst, Egå (16 stores)
- Kridthøj torv, Højbjerg (15 stores)
- Skåde centret, Skåde-Holme (15 stores)
- Hadsten centret, Hadsten (15 stores)
- Rundhøj centret, Højbjerg (15 stores)
- Trøjborg Centret, Århus (5.000 m^{2})

== Odense and suburbs ==
- Rosengårdcentret, Odense SØ (153 stores and restaurants, 100.000 m^{2})
- Tarup Center, Odense NV (44 stores, 22.000 m^{2})
- Vollsmose Torv, Vollsmose
- Odense Banegård Center, Odense C
- Fyn Bazar

== Aalborg and suburbs ==
- Aalborg Storcenter, Skalborg (65 stores, 46.000 m^{2})
- Kennedy Arkaden, Aalborg (12 stores, 8.000 m^{2})
- Friis Center, Aalborg (22 stores, 7.500 m^{2})
- Shoppen, Skalborg (17 stores, 28.000 m^{2}) (next to Aalborg Storcenter)

== Frederikssund ==
- Sillebroen Shoppingcenter, Frederikssund (75 stores, 28.000 m^{2}) opened in 2010

== Elsinore (Helsingør) and suburbs ==
- Elsinore bycenter, Elsinore (25 stores)
- Prøvestenscentret, Elsinore, (32 stores, 32.000 m^{2})
- Espergærde Centret, Espergærde (43 stores) the oldest shopping mall in Denmark

== Herning ==
- Herning Centret, Herning (76 stores)

== Hillerød ==
- Slotsarkaderne, Hillerød (opened in 1992, 65 stores, 25.500 m^{2})

== Horsens ==
- Bytorv Horsens, Horsens (opened in 2006, 31 stores, 6.400 m^{2})

== Kolding ==
- Kolding Storcenter (opened in 1993, 120+ stores, 62.000 m^{2})

== Esbjerg ==
- Esbjerg Storcenter (opened in 1993, 40 stores, 18.000 m^{2})
- Broen (opened in 2017, 60 stores, 27.000 m^{2})
- Sædding Centret (opened in 1977, 14 stores, 14.000 m^{2})

== Hjørring ==
- Metropol (opened in 2008, 35 stores, 46.500 m^{2})

== Næstved ==
- Næstved Storcenter, Næstved (opened in 1989, 65 stores, 50.000 m^{2})
- Sct. Jørgens Park, Næstved (20+ stores)

== Randers ==
- Randers Storcenter, Paderup (opened in 1998, 40 stores, 25.000 m^{2})

== Roskilde ==
- Ro's Torv, Roskilde (opened in 2003, 75 stores, 47.000 m^{2})

== Slagelse ==
- Vestsjællands Centret, Slagelse (opened in 1969, 40 stores, 23.000 m^{2})

== Vejle ==
- Bryggen, Vejle centrum (opened in 2008, 80 stores, 23.000 m^{2})
- Mary's, Vejle centrum (opened in 2007, 50 stores, 20.000 m^{2})

== Viborg ==
- Sct. Mathias Centret, Viborg (34 stores)
