= Salling (disambiguation) =

Salling is a peninsula in Denmark. Salling may also refer to

- Salling Clicker, a suite of computer programs to enable the remote control of a computer from a mobile phone
- Salling Group, a retail multinational
  - Salling (department store) in Denmark
- Salling (surname)
