= Netto UK =

British discount supermarket chain

Netto Limited
- Company type: Private (Inactive)
- Industry: Retail
- Genre: Supermarket
- Founded: 1990 (original); 2014 (revival)
- Defunct: 2011 (original); 2016 (revival)
- Headquarters: United Kingdom
- Area served: United Kingdom
- Key people: Morten Møberg Nielsen (Chief Executive)
- Owner: Salling Group
- Website: www.netto.co.uk

Netto was a discount supermarket chain in the United Kingdom. Netto arrived in the United Kingdom in December 1990, as part of an internationalisation process by its Danish owner, Salling Group. By May 2010, it operated 193 stores, before it was sold to Asda. In June 2014, Salling Group returned Netto to the United Kingdom, as a 50:50 joint venture with Sainsbury's.

In July 2016, the two companies announced they would end the joint venture, and close all of its stores, after Sainsbury's chose to focus on its main business ahead of any further investment.

== History ==
=== Foundation ===
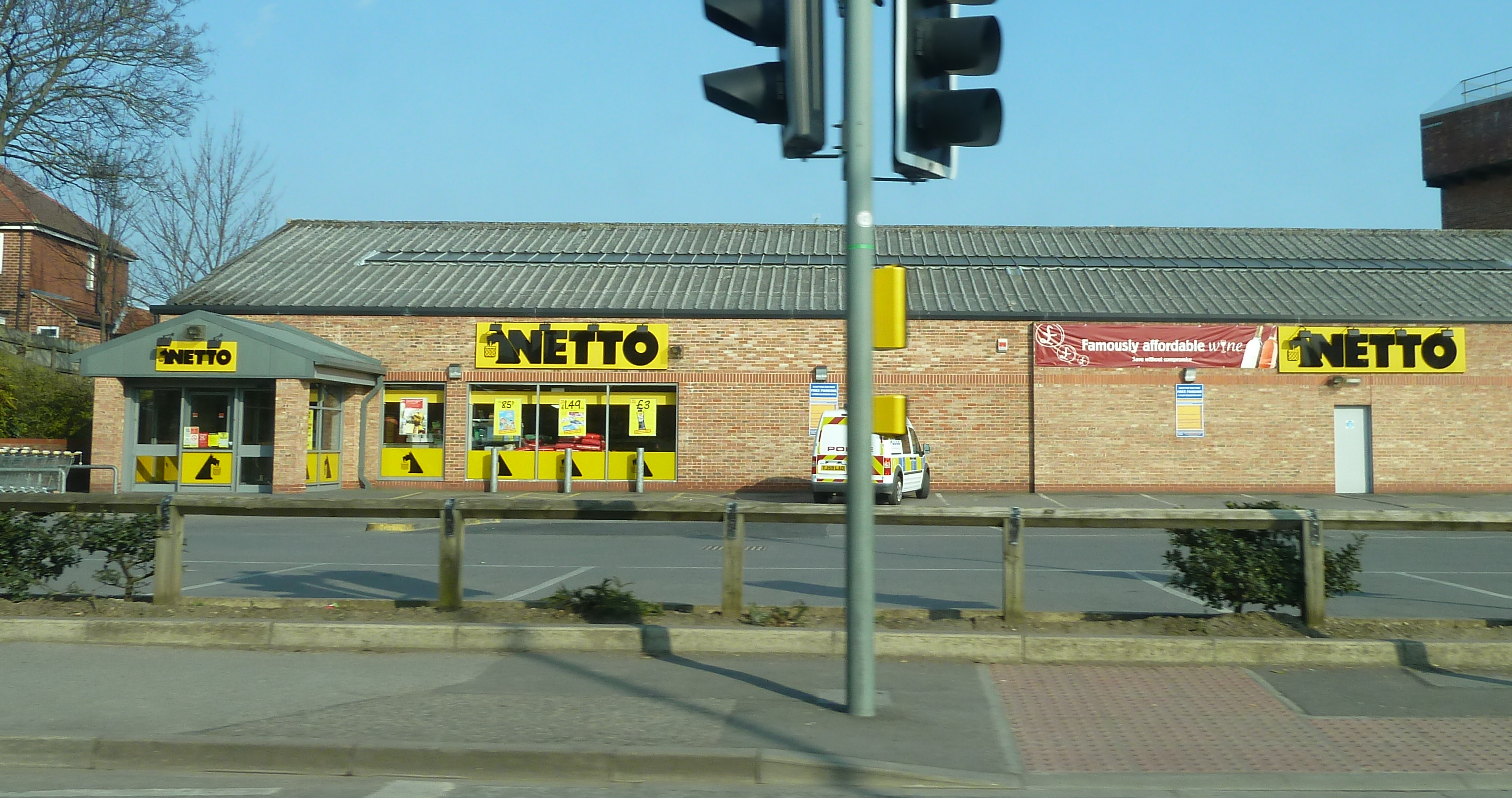
Netto in Northallerton, North Yorkshire, England

Netto began operating in England in Leeds, on 13 December 1990, with the company's United Kingdom headquarters being in the town of South Elmsall, West Yorkshire.

=== Expansion ===
Netto primarily expanded in central England, before moving into Southern England, namely London. In January 2005, plans for a £200 million investment in South Wales were announced, but were cancelled for logistical issues, resulting in the sale of stores in Barry and Caerphilly. 1,700 jobs were promised in the expansion, but only a few were created.

By May 2010, there were 193 stores in the United Kingdom, all in England and Wales.

=== Sale to Asda ===
In May 2010, Netto UK was bought by Asda for £778 million, to increase its smaller store portfolio. The rebranding of 147 former Netto stores, under the Asda brand was complete by 29 November 2011. Competition laws required Asda to sell the remaining forty seven stores to other companies, such as Morrisons, the convenience store Ugo, and other retailers.

=== Re establishment with Sainsbury's ===
In June 2014, Salling Group announced a 50:50 joint venture, to operate supermarkets with Sainsbury's. The stores were to be between 10,000 square feet (900 m^{2}) and 15,000 square feet (1,400 m^{2}) in size. Netto opened the first new store in Moor Allerton, Leeds, on 6 November 2014, followed by stores in Sheffield Kilner Way Retail Park, Manchester Heaton Park, Doncaster Edenthorpe and Ormskirk The Hattersley Centre.

On 13 April 2015, it was announced that The Co-operative Food store in Hedon, East Yorkshire, would become the sixth Netto store to launch, following the sale of the existing store.

By December 2015, the company planned to have around 15 Netto stores in Northern England. By 25 January 2016, however, the business operated thirteen stores. On 4 July 2016, it was announced that following a strategic review of the joint partnership, that all stores would be closed during August 2016.

== Former operations ==
Country	Stores	From	Until
United Kingdom	193	1990	2011
United Kingdom	16	2014	2016

=== Stores ===
By 2011, 193 Netto stores were sold to Asda, who under Competition Commission requirements then disposed of twenty seven stores to Morrisons, and twenty stores to Haldanes (including Ugo). This venture failed, with Haldanes going into administration in February 2012, with the twenty stores being sold to Poundstretcher.

The fate of the stores were as follows:

- 165 stores rebranded to Asda.
- 20 stores sold to Haldanes (Ugo).
- 27 stores sold to Morrisons.
- 3 stores demolished.

The Netto store in Halifax, West Yorkshire was demolished. There were proposals for the store to be turned into offices, whilst the car park was developed into Broad Street Plaza, an entertainment complex. The store in Wolverhampton City Centre was also demolished in 2015 and developed into the new market area. The store in Canterbury was another of the stores demolished after closure in 2011 and was rebuilt into student accommodation (St Georges Centre).

=== Store format ===
Netto stores carried a discount supermarket style store format. Many prices were very similar to wholesale prices, in a style and concept closest to the Kwik Save brand. To enforce fairness to all shoppers, many offers were limited to six per person. Netto sold brand name products, such as Pepsi and Walkers Crisps, which were often parallel imports.

== See also ==
- Netto (store)
