= Nordre Cemetery =

Cemetery in Aarhus, Denmark

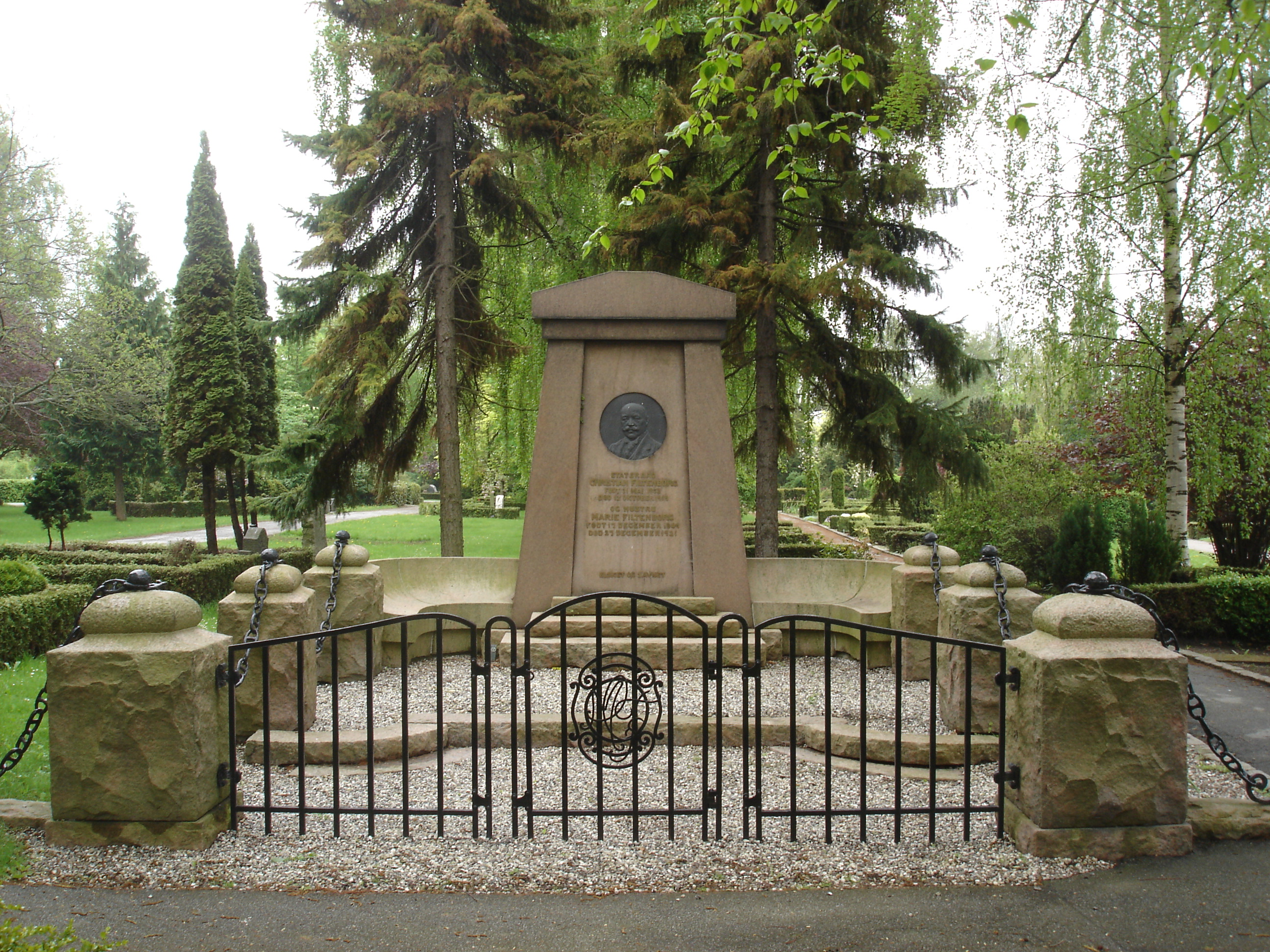
- A grave monument (Christian Filtenborg)
- Interactive map of Nordre Cemetery

Details
- Established: 1876
- Location: Aarhus
- Country: Denmark
- Coordinates: 56°10′4″N 10°12′51″E
- Type: Public
- Owned by: Aarhus Municipality
- Size: 14.8 ha (37 acres)
- Website: Official website

Nordre Cemetery (Northern Cemetery) is a cemetery in Aarhus, Denmark. It was established in 1876, east of Aarhus University and Aarhus University Hospital by Nørrebrogade.

Nordre Cemetery was established from the early 1870s to 1892 and was inaugurated in 1876. The cemetery replaced Søndre Kirkegård formerly located on the site of the present day city hall. The chapel is architecturally in Neo-Romanesque style and was inaugurated in 1880. The chapel was remodelled in 1909 and a crematorium was added in the basement in 1941.

Nordre Cemetery has been expanded several times in 1891, 1892, 1899 and 1912. In 1920 it was decided to establish Vestre Kirkegård since Nordre Kirkegård was filling up and the new cemetery was inaugurated 7 years later. Enrico Mylius Dalgas, Peter Sabroe, Hans Broge and Herman Salling are interred in Nordre Kirkegård.

== Graves ==
Some notable people buried at Nordre Cemetery include:

- Hans Broge, merchant and politician (1822-1908)
- Enrico Mylius Dalgas, engineer (1828-1894)
- Rudolf Frimodt Clausen, architect (1861-1950)
- Carl Hammerich, admiral and naval officer (1888-1945)
- Julius Høegh-Guldberg, officer, commissioner and politician (1779-1861)
- Hans Peter Ingerslev, politician and minister (1831-1896)
- Jørgen Jensen, athlete (1944-2009)
- Carl Vilhelm Puck, architect (1882-1954)
- Vilhelm Carl Puck (Vilhelm Puck), architect (1844-1926)
- Peter Sabroe, journalist, politician, and children's rights advocate (1867-1913)
- Ferdinand Salling, merchant and entrepreneur (1880-1953)
- Herman Salling, merchant and director. Son of Ferdinand Salling (1919-2006)
- Svend Unmack Larsen, minister and mayor of Aarhus (1945–1958)
