= Vestergade 20 =

Building in Copenhagen

- Tre Hjorter
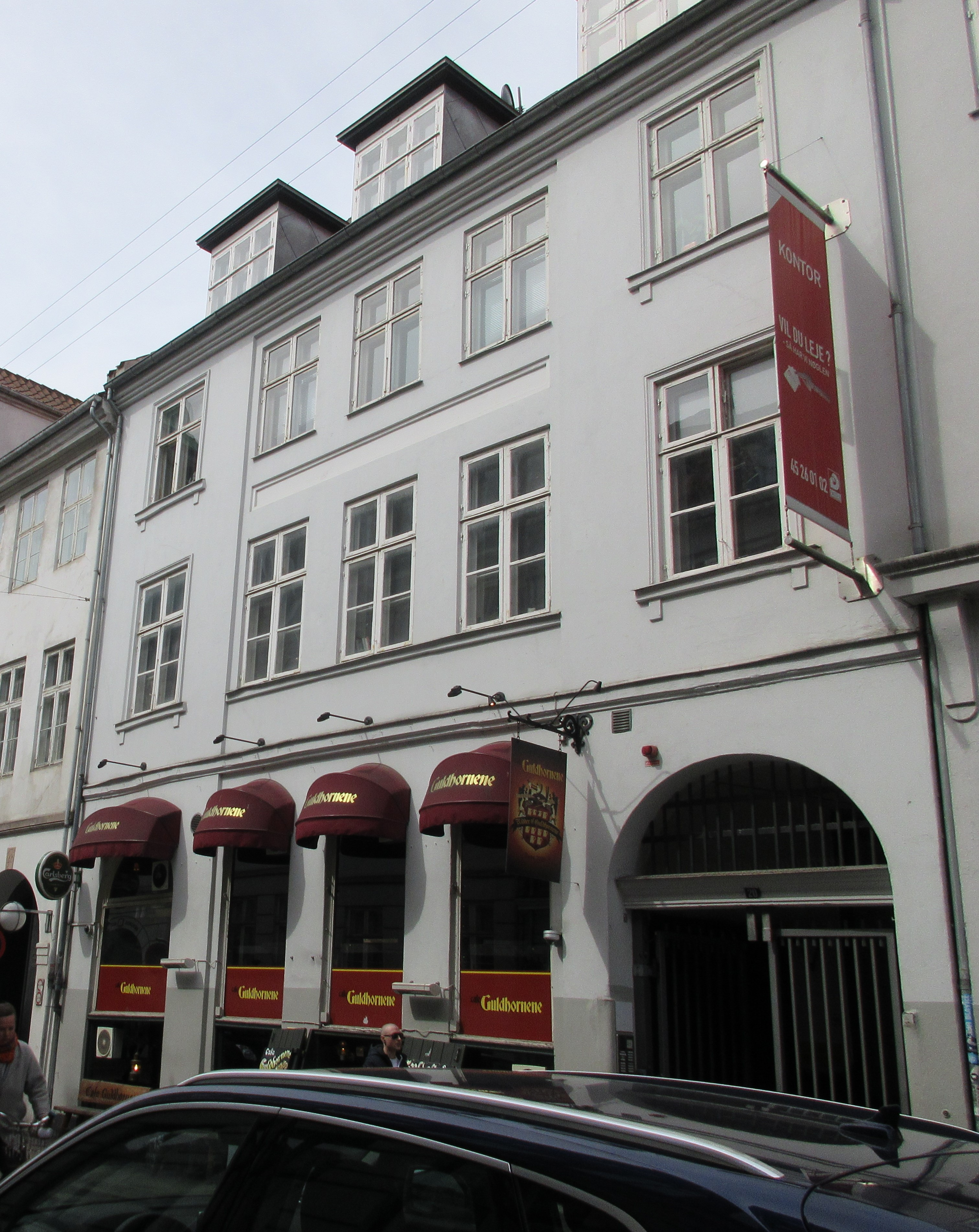
- Interactive map of the Vestergade 20 area

General information
- Location: Copenhagen, Denmark
- Coordinates: 55°40′38.57″N 12°34′9.95″E
- Completed: 1798

Vestergade 20 is a Neoclassical property in the Latin Quarter of Copenhagen, Denmark. The building was operated as a guesthouse under the name Vinkanden (The Wine Jug) and the name was later changed to Dannebrog (after Dannebrog). The current building was constructed after the Copenhagen Fire of 1795. It housed J. E. Felumb's piano factory from 1882. It was listed on the Danish registry of protected buildings and places in 1939.

== History ==
=== Early history ===
The property was in the Middle Ages, like many other properties in the street, owned by the Church of Our Lady. In 1498, it was acquired by Sorø Abbey and used as the city home of the abbot. After the Reformation, in 1565, it was ceded to the crown. King Christian gave it to royal plummer Hans Dornitzer. The following residents included a smith, a tanner and a goldsmith.

In 1655, the property was acquired by an Icelandic innkeeper and cook, Børge Nielsen, who opened a guesthouse under the name Vinkanden (The Wine Jug) at the site. The guesthouse was in 1678 sold by his widow to innkeeper Willum Schotte but he died just two years later. Vinkanden was then acquired by Aage Holm. He sold it to royal trumpeter Willum Viander. After his death, in 1714, Vinkabnden was sold at auction. The buyer was Torsten Thorsen Hedeland, an innkeeper and bargeman.

The 8-bay, timber-framed building was completely destroyed in the Copenhagen Fire of 1728. The site was 17.5 m wide and 54 m deep at the deepest place.

=== After the Copenhagen Fire of 1728 ===
The house was soon rebuilt and now consisted of a building towards the street and an L-shaped building to the west and north while the courtyard was open to the east (towards No. 18). Vinkanden was at some point renamed Dannebrog. Towards the end of the century other tenants in the complex included a joiner named Kaarøe, a furnituremaker named Fjellerup, a butcher's widow named Andersen, a tobacco manufacturer named Lind and a button maker named Rudolff. The building was again destroyed by fire if the Copenhagen Fire of 1795.

=== After the Copenhagen Fire of 1795 ===
The current house at the site was built by Anton Christopher Wilcken (ca.1760-1816) in 1797–98. In 1809,. it was owned by merchant J. F. Stubs. The guesthouse was operated by Hans Madsen and the tenants were a shoemaker named Feinwaldt, a manager named Conrad, two joiners named Goetsche and Lehmann, a district physician named Jacobsen and a beer merchant named Nielsen. The names Rudolff, Conrad, Feinwaldt, Goetsche and Lehmann reflect the high number of German immigrants who had settled in Copenhagen during the 18th century.

In 1844, the owner of the property was E.C. Fenger from Store Kongensgade. The tenants were an assessor, a volunteer in the Treasury (Rentekammeret), a joiner, two merchants and the innkeeper.

The building was in the 1860s owned by Fritz Dithmer. Urtekræmmer C. L. Nielsen operated a shop in the basement and lived with his family on the first floor. J. F. Johansen, a pub owner and restaurateur, lived on the ground floor. His apartment was later taken over by D. C. Grandjean who operated a guesthouse in the rear wing. A joiner had his workshop on the second floor. A glazier and a house painter were based on the second and third floors of the side wing.

N. F. Munch, a trading house, was in the 1870s based in the ground floor. A wholesaler named Trier and a lawyer (overretsprokurator) were tenants on the first and second floors.

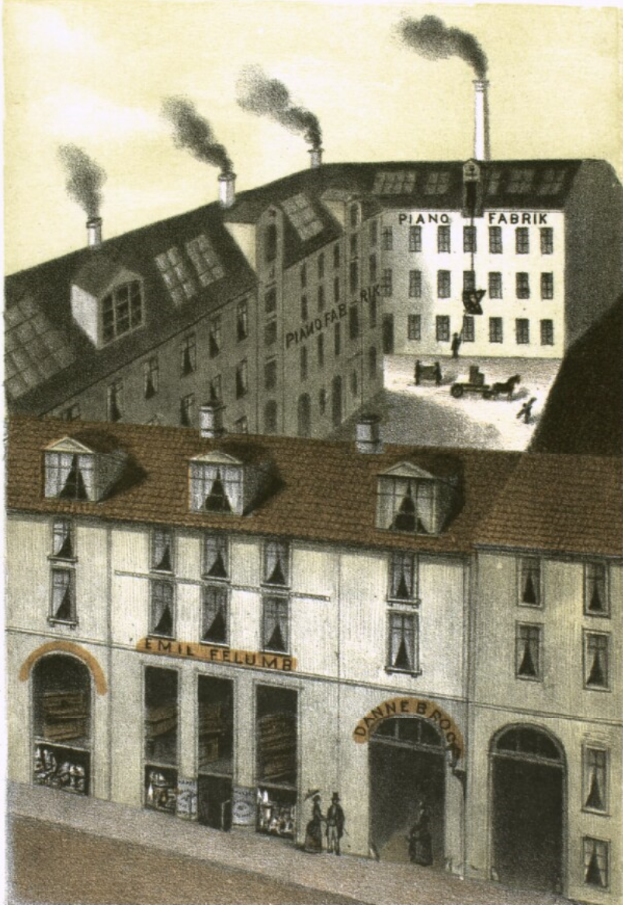
J. E. Felumb's piano factory

J. E. Felumb, a piano maker, purchased the entire building in 1882 and converted it into a piano factory and piano shop. Emil Felumb had been born in 1842 as the son of a goldsmith. He was educated as a pianoforte builder in Copenhagen, London, Paris and Switzerland. In 1872, he developed a special piano that Niels W. Gade was very fond of. He then started his own company in Magstræde which later moved to Vester Voldgade and then to the building in Vestergade. Iron and timber was stored and processed on the two lower floors. Four to five pianos left the factory every week in the period from 1882 to 1904. The daily operations were overseen by Felumb's nephew A. Theuerkauf.

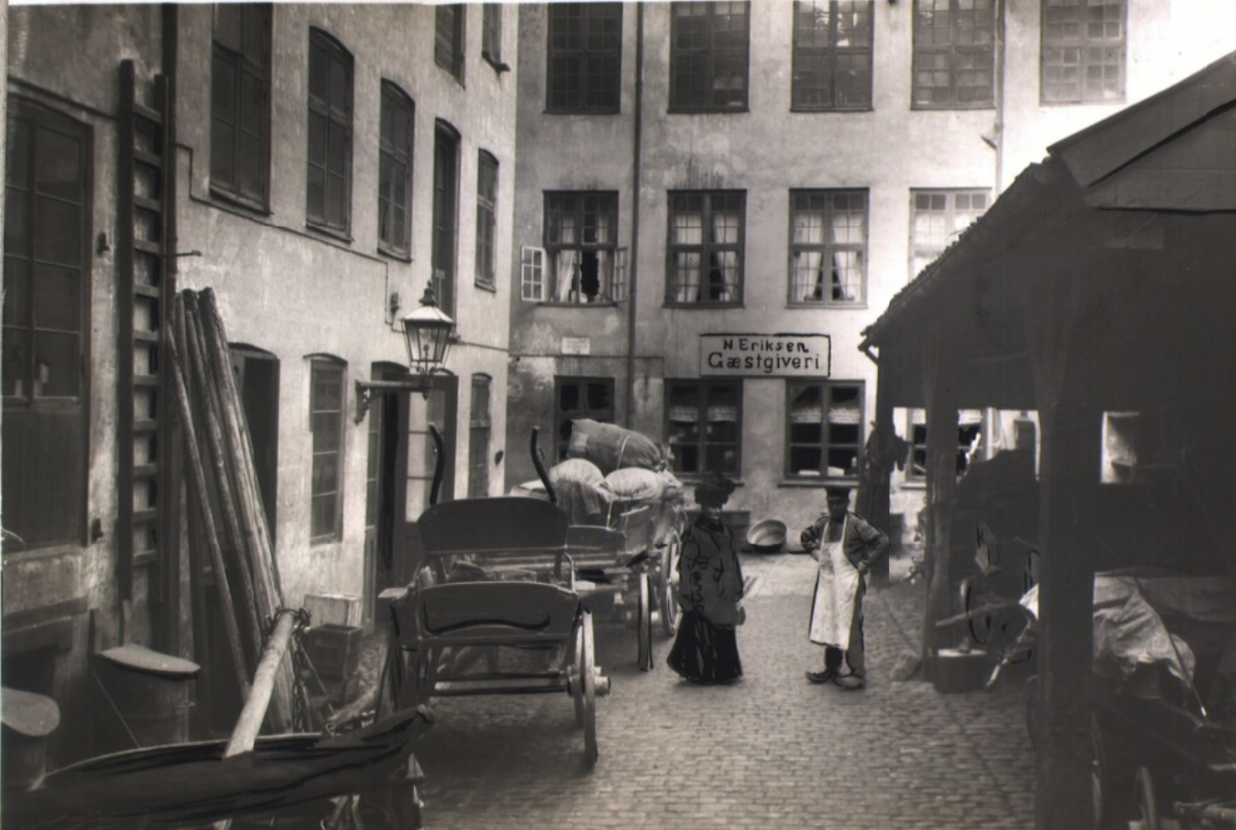
The courtyard with a sign advertising N. Eriksen's Guesthouse, 1014

The guesthouse continued its operations in part of the rear wing. A physician had his clinic on the first floor and a joiner who possibly worked for the piano factory was based on the second floor. The grocery store was still located in the basement. The physician on the first floor was eventually succeeded by two lawyers. The second floor was taken over by a law firm and in the 1920s by Jens Tofts Frihavnen's coffee company. Sophus Schou operated a shirt and tie manufactory on the third floor. He later also rented the basement in the front wing. The company continued operations in the building until the 1970s.

The piano factory sold the building after 1915. The new owner was Brødrene Justesen, a wholesaling company from Randers, which was established in Copenhagen in 1889. The company was also the owner of the neighbouring building at No. 18 and Studiestræde 37. The factory space was let out to Brødrene Corell, a pipe factory. The basement was now turned into a wine store. A manufacturer of textile shoes, Thor, opened in the rear wing. It was later succeeded by a manufacturer of straw hats. A non-alcoholic restaurant was also operated in the building. Brødrene Justesen was based at the site until it was absorbed by Dagrofa in 1983. Minerva Reproduktioner, a manufacturer of silk prints, opened on the second floor in the A Building in circa 1950. They remained in the building at least until the 1970s.

The next owner of the building was A/S Det københavnske Ejendoms Societet. Ekstra-Bladet rented part of the third floor when nearby Politikens Hus became too small in the early 1990s.

== Architecture ==
The building is five bays wide. The three central bays are slightly recessed. A gateway in the east side of the building opens to a central courtyard. The westernmost bay is placed in an arched niche similar to that of the gateway to create an impression of symmetry. The building was listed on the Danish registry of protected buildings and places.

== Cultural references ==
In Ludvig Holberg's play ”Den ellevte Junii”, it is mentioned that it is possible to stay in the Dannebrog in Vestergade for 2 skilling a night.
