= TOJ =

Toj or TOJ may refer to:

- ToJ, a German race car constructor
- Madrid–Torrejón Airport, IATA code: TOJ
- Open-jaw ticket

== See also ==
- Tøj & Sko, a Danish clothing store
- Luis Enrique Medrano Toj (born 1976), Guatemalan weightlifter
