= Salling (department store) =

Danish retail chain

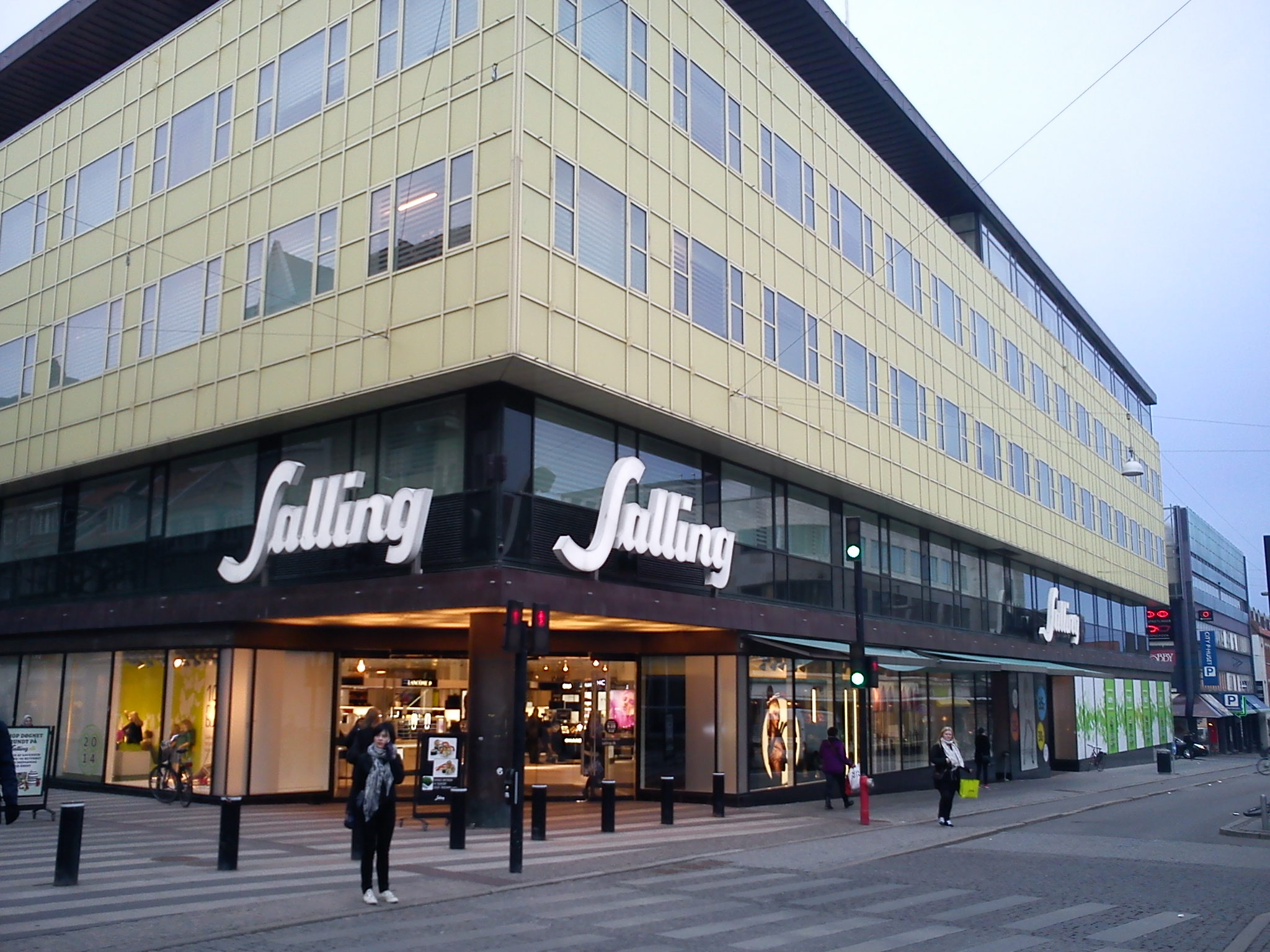
- Industry: Retail
- Founded: 1906
- Founder: Ferdinand Salling
- Headquarters: Aarhus, Denmark
- Key people: Herman Salling
- Products: Department stores
- Owner: The Salling Companies (81%) / A.P. Moller-Maersk Group (19%)
- Website: https://salling.dk/

Salling is a Danish retail chain that operates three department stores located in the Danish cities of Aarhus, Aalborg, and Copenhagen. The company used to be known as F. Salling Stormagasin A/S.

As of November 2017, the company was 100% owned by the Salling Foundation and operated by Salling Group. As of 2014, Salling Group (before 2018, known as Dansk Supermarked) was 81% owned by F. Salling Invest A/S and F. Salling Holding A/S (known as the Salling Companies) and 19% owned by A.P. Moller-Maersk Group.

== See also ==
- Føtex
- Bilka
- Netto
- Dansk Supermarked A/S
