= Føtex =

Danish retail chain

- Industry: Retail
- Genre: Supermarket
- Founder: Herman Salling, 1960
- Headquarters: Højbjerg, Denmark
- Area served: Denmark
- Parent: Dansk Supermarked Gruppen
- Website: http://fotex.dk

føtex is a Danish chain of supermarkets. The business was established in 1960 as the first supermarket in Denmark and later gave rise to Salling Group (previously Dansk Supermarked Group).

The name "føtex" is a mix of the Danish words "Fødevarer" (daily groceries) and "Textil" (textiles).

== History ==
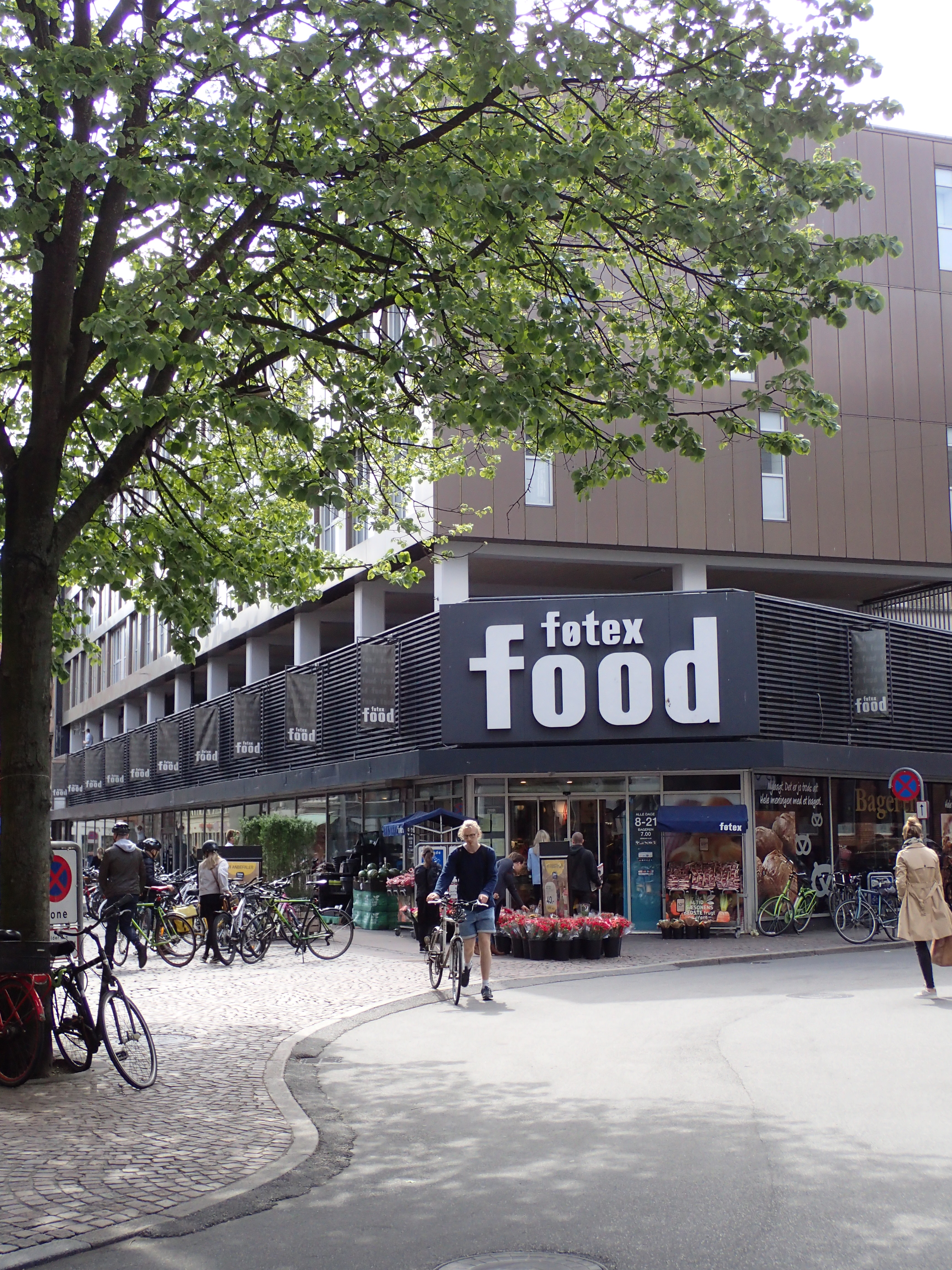
The first føtex store in Guldsmedgade, Aarhus from 1960. The store was renovated in 2010 and the føtex food concept was introduced.

Herman Salling opened the first føtex in 1960 in the street "Guldsmedgade" in the city of Århus in Denmark. Føtex in many ways revolutionized the way in which the Danes shopped: this was the first time the Danes saw a non-food (electronics, clothes, perfumes, books etc.) and a food department gathered under one roof.

In 1964, Herman Salling, ancestor of Ferdinand Salling, realized that to compete with other initiatives starting in those years, he needed a strong financial support. He contacted the A.P. Møller-Mærsk Group, which acquired 50% of the shares and supported Sallings project financially.

As of 2006, the chain consists of 76 stores located all over Denmark.

== A typical store ==
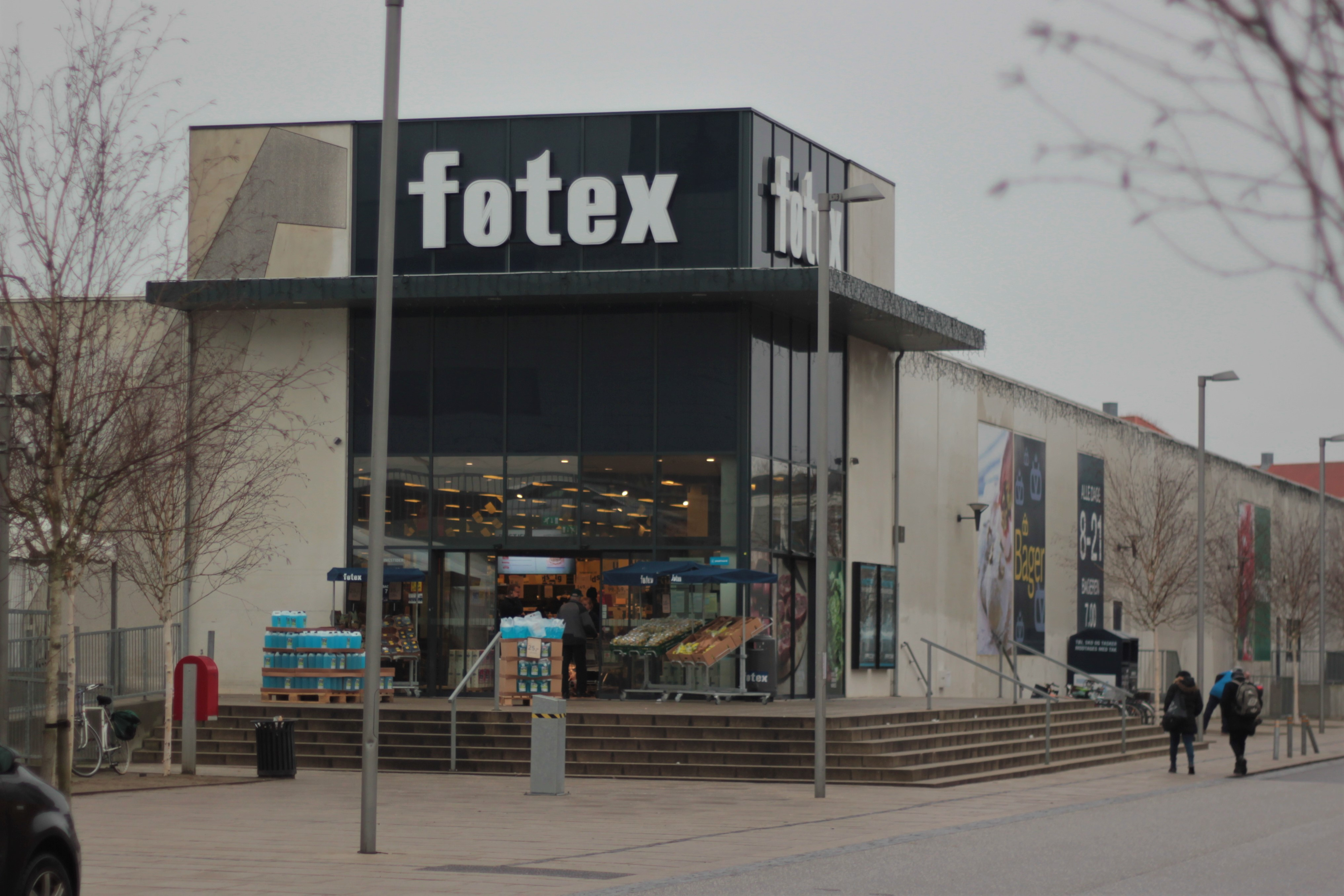
A Føtex store in Aalborg

Inside a typical føtex, there is a food section, a deli and a non-food section. The food section is like a full-service supermarket, with a bakery and a butcher. Many stores offer both self-checkout and staffed checkout.

The non-food section includes electronics, cosmetics and clothing among other general things.

Føtex also launched an e-commerce area with the ability to print digital photos. The online store also includes music downloads.

== føtex food ==
The føtex food concept was introduced in 2010, also in the original store in Guldsmedgade in Aarhus at the store's 50-year anniversary. The føtex food concept phased out the non-food departments and concentrated focus on food items instead.

== See also ==
- Bilka
- Netto
- Tøj & Sko
- A.P. Møller-Mærsk
- Dansk Supermarked A/S
