= Herning Centret =

Shopping mall in Herning, Denmark

Coordinates: 56°8′7.56″N 8°59′58.15″E

HerningCentret is a shopping mall in Herning, Denmark, by Herningmotorvejen and Midtjyske Highway. The Centre opened in 1978 and now contains 60 shops. It is the largest center in the Central Region. The centre has, among other things, Søstrene Grene, Kvickly Xtra and Jensen's Bøfhus. HerningCentret grew by 20 stores in 2009.
