= SuperBest =

Former Danish supermarket chain

- Type: Private
- Industry: Retail
- Genre: Supermarket
- Defunct: 2015
- Headquarters: Ringsted, Denmark
- Area served: Denmark
- Parent: Dagrofa A/S
- Website: http://www.superbest.dk

SuperBest was a chain of Danish supermarkets with approximately 220 stores around the country.

In 2007 they took over the two supermarket chains Iso and Dreisler Storkøb. After NorgesGruppen bought a 49% stake in SuperBest's parent company Dagrofa, the SuperBest brand was discontinued in favour of NorgesGruppen's more upmarket Meny brand.

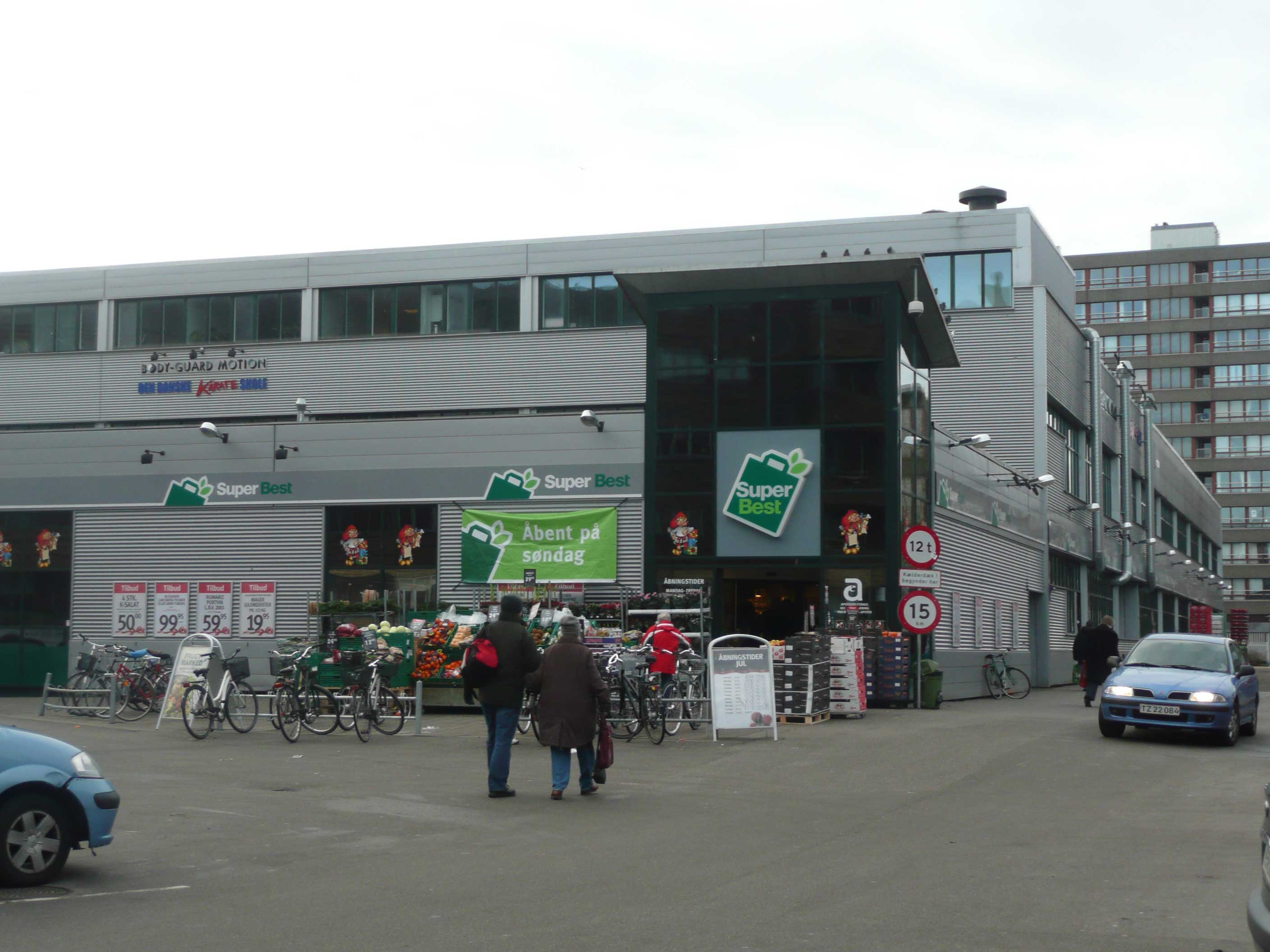
A SuperBest in East Copenhagen.

== See also ==
- Meny
