= Salling (surname) =

Salling is the surname of the following people

- Augusta Salling (born 1954), finance minister of Greenland
- Harald Salling-Mortensen (1902–1969), Danish architect
- Herman Salling (1919–2006), Danish grocery store founder and director
- John B. Salling (1856–1959), veteran of the American Civil War
- John Peter Salling, 18th century German explorer
- Lotte Salling (born 1964), Danish writer
- Mark Salling (1982–2018), American actor and musician who pleaded guilty to child pornography charges in 2017
