= Tøj & Sko =

Danish clothing store

- Industry: Retail
- Founder: 1981
- Headquarters: Denmark
- Area served: Denmark
- Parent: Dansk Supermarked Gruppen
- Website: http://www.toejsko.dk/

Tøj & Sko was a Danish clothing and footwear store. The shop was a discount clothing store and operated 37 stores across Denmark. It was founded in 1981, and was part of Bilka A/S, which in turn was owned by Dansk Supermarked A/S. In 2012, it was decided to close all stores.

The name "Tøj & Sko", translates to "Clothing & Footwear" in English.
