= Aalborg Storcenter =

Shopping mall in Aalborg, Denmark

Coordinates: 57°0′16.76″N 9°52′27.44″E

Aalborg Storcenter is a shopping mall located in Skalborg, a City District of Aalborg, Denmark. It opened in 1996. The mall has about 75 stores and restaurants. One of those is a large Bilka store, which opened in 1972.
