= Ferdinand Salling =

Danish merchant and entrepreneur

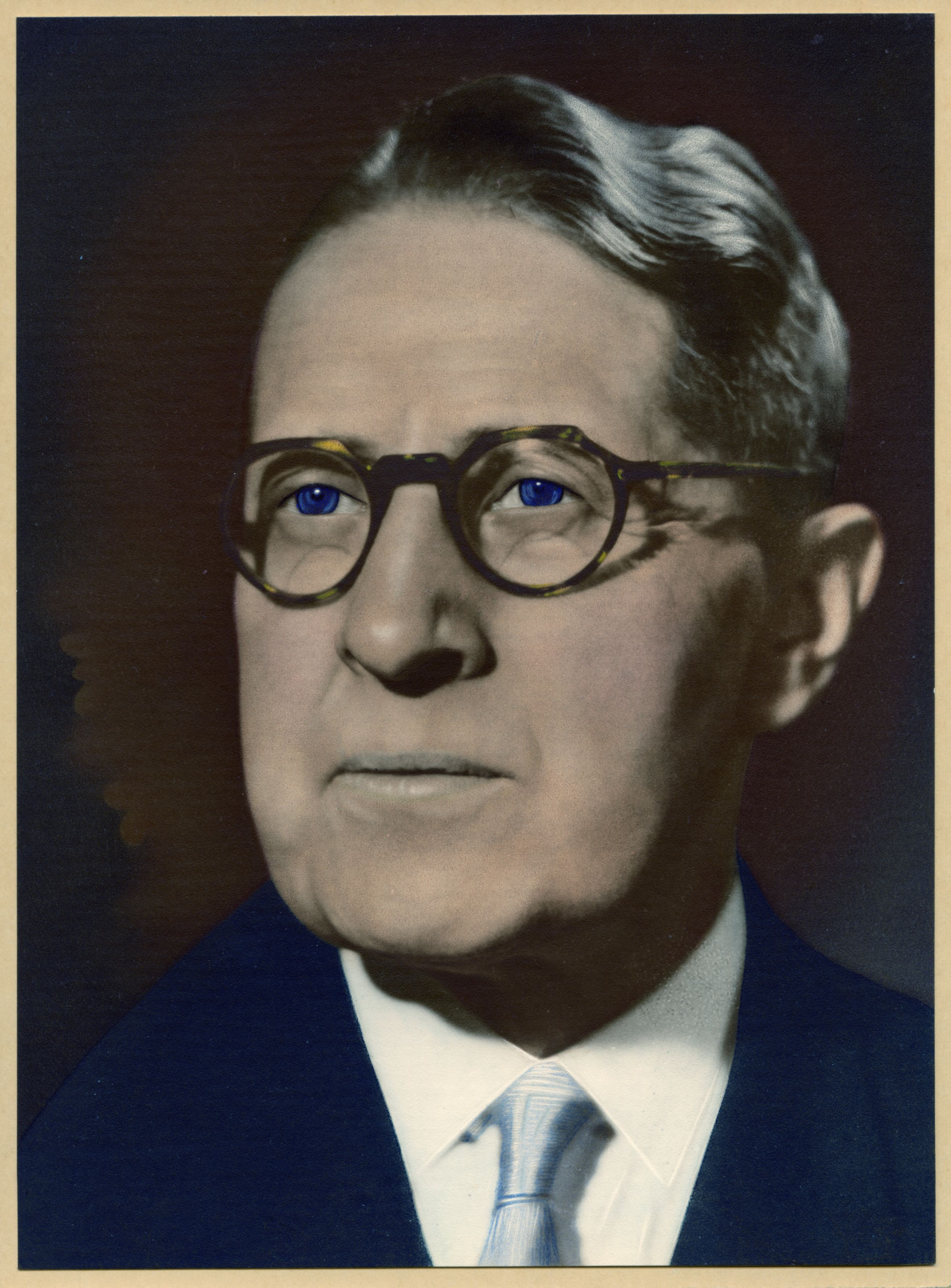
- Ferdinand Salling
- Born: 10 May 1880; Aarhus, Denmark
- Died: 22 June 1953 (aged 73); Aarhus, Denmark

Ferdinand Frederik Salling (10 May 1880 – 22 June 1953) was a Danish merchant and entrepreneur who founded one of the largest warehouse chains and companies in Denmark. Ferdinand Salling founded the Salling warehouse chain and the company that would later own most of Dansk Supermarked. Hans Christian Salling married Karen Marie Jensen (1838–1919) on 30 July 1918 and the couple had the son Herman Salling.

Ferdinand Salling's parents were Hans Christian Salling (1841–1923) and Karen Marie Jensen (1838–1919). After completing school, Ferdinand was given an apprenticeship at Ulrich Marcussen in Fredericia. Salling later moved on to work for P. Sieburg in Odense and Alfred Zacho in Randers. In Randers, Ferdinand had to manage the store for some time during the illness of his boss. His time in Randers may have given him the experience and confidence in his own business. On 19 October 1906, he opened the store "Ferdinand Salling" in Aarhus. Initially, he sold furniture for bedrooms and appliances, but the stock soon expanded. In 1912, he moved to larger rooms in Søndergade 27 and later had the building at Søndergade 29 added. The business grew gradually and over time he bought more properties in the vicinity. During the Second World War, expansion was stymied but in 1946 they were resumed.

In 1948, the beginnings of Salling Stormagasin was established. The company was changed to a limited company and at the time it was the largest retail outlet in the city. When Salling died, the company was taken over by his 33 year old son Herman Salling.
