= Bilka =

Danish supermarket chain

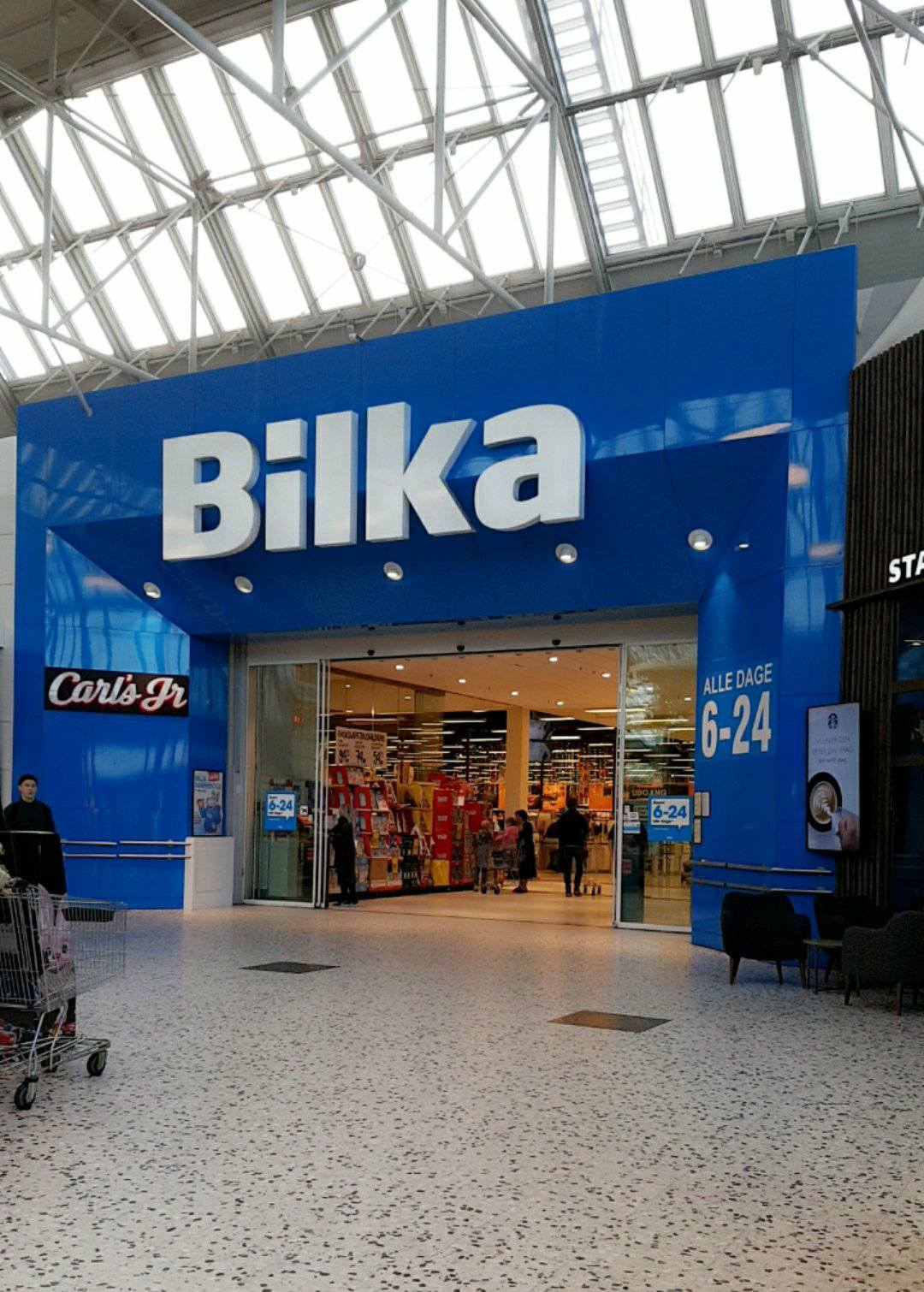
- Industry: Retail
- Genre: Hypermarket
- Founded: 1970
- Founder: Herman Salling
- Headquarters: Højbjerg, Denmark
- Area served: Denmark
- Parent: Salling Group
- Website: Bilka.dk

Bilka is a Danish chain of hypermarkets. The first store opened in 1970 in Tilst, a suburb of Aarhus. The chain was founded by Herman Salling and is now a part of Salling Group.

== Name ==
The name Bilka is derived from the German Billiges Kaufhaus (low-price department store), which its founder, Herman Salling had encountered during his business trips to West Germany.

== The first Bilka store ==
The first Bilka store was the first low-cost store in Denmark. With a sale area of 10000 square meters and parking space for 1200 cars, it was also the largest store in Denmark.

The opening of the first Bilka store brought revision to the regional plan for Great Aarhus from 1954. According to that plan the area of Aarhus was supposed to have 2 new centers, but after the opening of the first Bilka store, this plan was no longer economically viable.

The building of the store was approved by Brabrand-Årslev Parish, since the land was part of the Brabrand Parish.The developer of the store, however decided he wanted to create remote storage for Salling Group. That is the reason why the Bilka store was functioning as an open stock market with most of the goods stocked in pallets and forklifts in the aisles during open hours.

At the beginning of 2010, the first Bilka store celebrated its 40th birthday and it was completely renovated. All of the old 31 cash registers, from 1970, were replaced with 28 new modern ones and 8 self-service terminals. Furthermore, all the departments were completely renovated and today, this store has the largest fruits and vegetables department in Denmark.

== Bilka stores ==
There are Bilka stores located in the following cities:

Year opened	Store	Area	City	Info
1970	Bilka	29.000 m^{2}	Tilst	
1972	Bilka	28.700 m^{2}	Aalborg	From 1996 a part of Aalborg Storcenter
1973	Bilka	27.800 m^{2}	Hundige	Part of Waves
1976	Bilka	22.500 m^{2}	Odense	
1982	Bilka	20.000 m^{2}	Ishøj	Part of Ishøj Bycenter
1988	Bilka	12.600 m^{2}	Slagelse	
1989	Bilka	19.900 m^{2}	Næstved	Part of Næstved Storcenter
1993	Bilka	14.800 m^{2}	Holstebro	
1993	Bilka	19.400 m^{2}	Vejle	Former A-Z
1993	Bilka	19.300 m^{2}	Kolding	Part of Kolding Storcenter
1994	Bilka	16.500 m^{2}	Esbjerg	Former A-Z
2001	Bilka	14.200 m^{2}	Horsens	
2003	Bilka	13.000 m^{2}	Ørestad	Part of Field's
2005	Bilka	13.400 m^{2}	Viborg	Former A-Z
2009	Bilka	11.800 m^{2}	Sønderborg	Former A-Z
2011	Bilka	10.400 m^{2}	Herning	Former A-Z
2012	Bilka		Hillerød	Part of Slotsarkaderne
2018	Bilka		Randers	Part of Randers Storcenter

== See also ==
- Dansk Supermarked Gruppen
- A.P. Møller-Mærsk
- A-Z
- Netto
- føtex
