= Jensen's Bøfhus =

Danish steakhouse chain

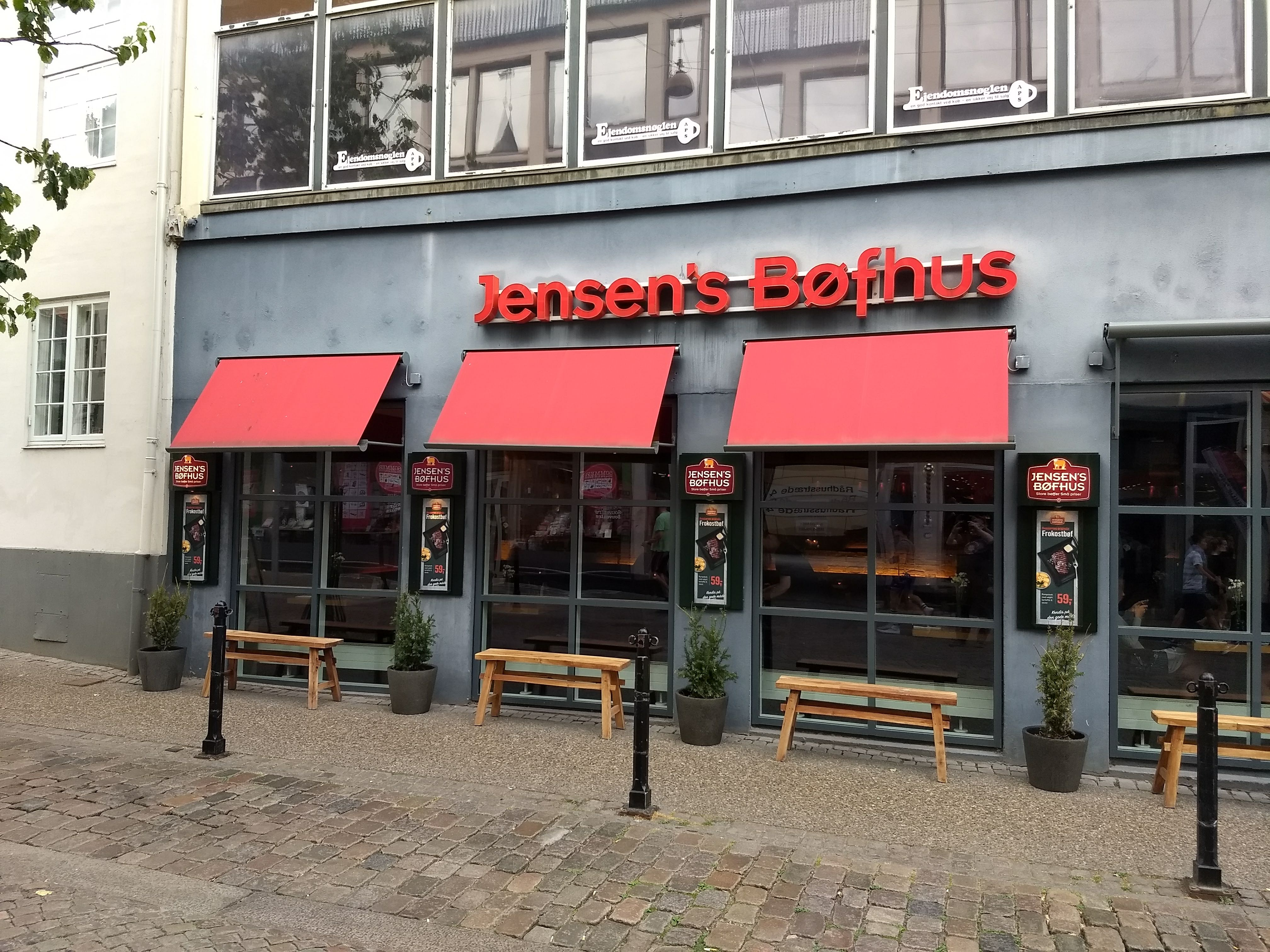
- A Jensens Bøfhus restaurant in Randers, Denmark
- Industry: Restaurants
- Founded: 1984; 42 years ago
- Founder: Palle Skov Jensen
- Defunct: 2025; 1 year ago
- Headquarters: Odense, Denmark
- Number of locations: 27
- Areas served: Denmark; Norway; Sweden
- Website: jensens.com/da/

Jensens Bøfhus ([ˈjensn̩s pøfˈhuˀs], "Jensens Beef House") was a Danish steakhouse chain consisting of 27 restaurants (September 2023); 21 in Denmark, 4 in Sweden and 2 in Norway.

It started in the year of 1984 when Palle Skov Jensen opened the first restaurant which was then called Bøfhus España in Aarhus, Denmark. The name was changed to the current in 1990 and at that point there were only four restaurants. It unsuccessfully attempted to expand to Germany by opening a restaurant in Lübeck but withdrew from the endeavour in 2016.

Public opinion turned against Jensens in Denmark after the company pursued and won a legal battle against a small fish restaurant which they claimed unrightfully used their brand.

In 2018 multiple restaurants in Denmark were shut down due to excessive losses in fiscal year 2017.

As of late 2018 the chain is still owned by Palle Skov Jensen.

The company announced in November 2025 that its remaining restaurants would be closed.
