= Meny =

Norwegian supermarket chain

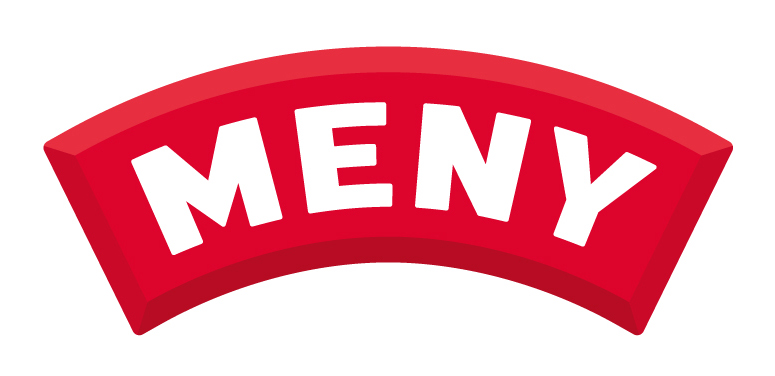
- Meny logo

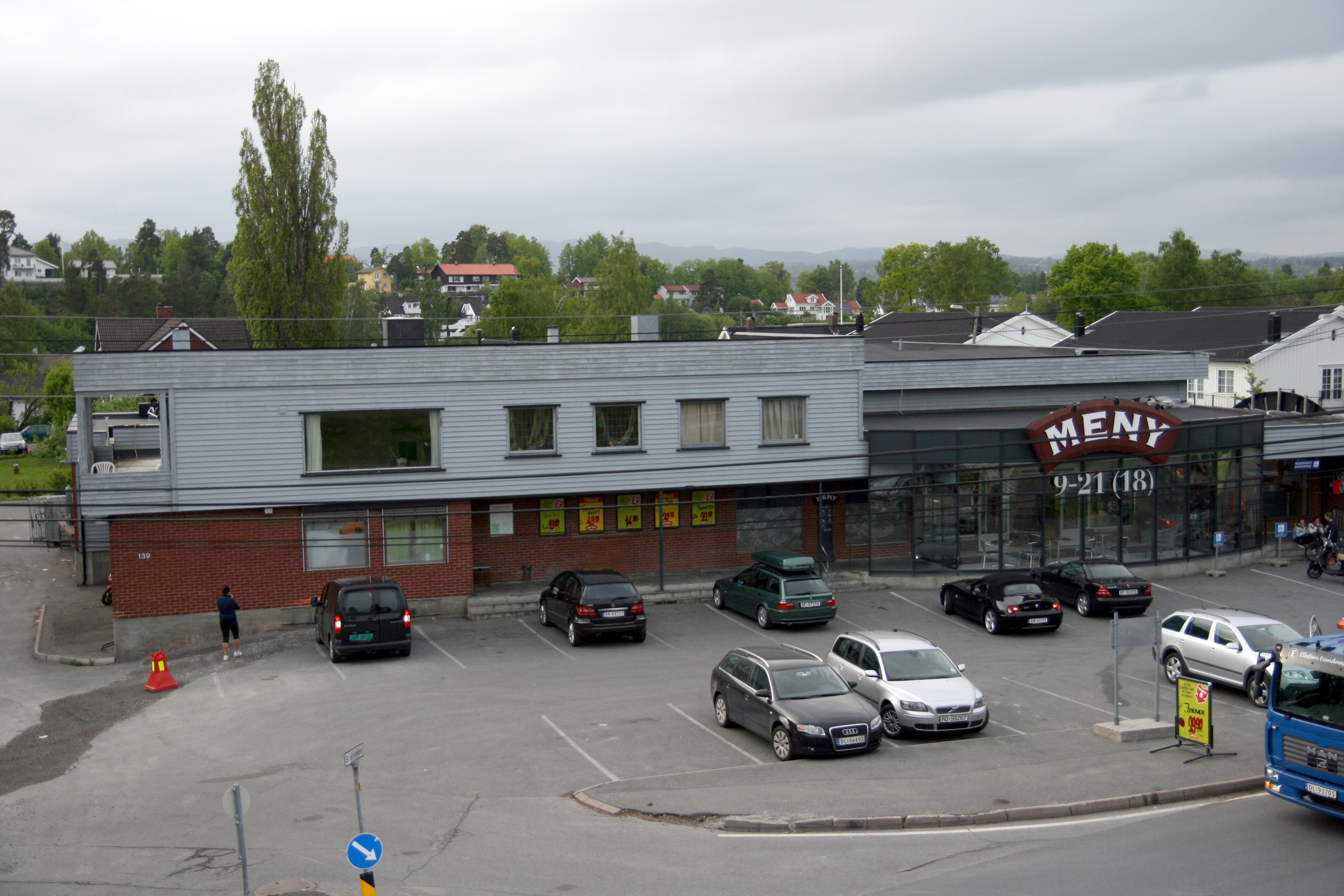
- Meny supermarket in Snarøya, Norway
- Product type: Supermarket
- Current owner: NorgesGruppen
- Country: Norway
- Introduced: 1992
- Markets: Norway, Denmark
- Website: Norway, Denmark

Meny (meaning "Menu") is a Norwegian and Danish supermarket chain owned by NorgesGruppen and Dagrofa (only the Danish stores, NorgesGruppen owns a 49% stake in Dagrofa). The chain historically was only active in Norway, where 187 stores operate under the brand. In 2015, 119 Meny stores opened in Denmark, which are rebranded SuperBest and Eurospar stores, brands owned by the Danish Dagrofa. The first Danish Meny stores opened in April 2015.

The brand operates so called 'full-service' supermarkets, focusing on offering a large choice of fresh and/or high quality products as opposed to discount supermarkets that offer low prices.

In Denmark Meny has 5,500 employees.
