= Ugo (retailer) =

Chain of convenience stores in the UK

Ugo Stores
- Industry: Retail
- Founded: January 2011
- Defunct: February 2012
- Headquarters: Grantham, Lincolnshire, England, UK
- Key people: Arthur Harris (CEO)
- Products: Groceries
- Parent: Haldanes Group (2011–2012); Poundstretcher (2012–present)

Ugo (stylised as UGO) was a chain of convenience stores in the United Kingdom owned by the Haldanes Group and was started in January 2011.

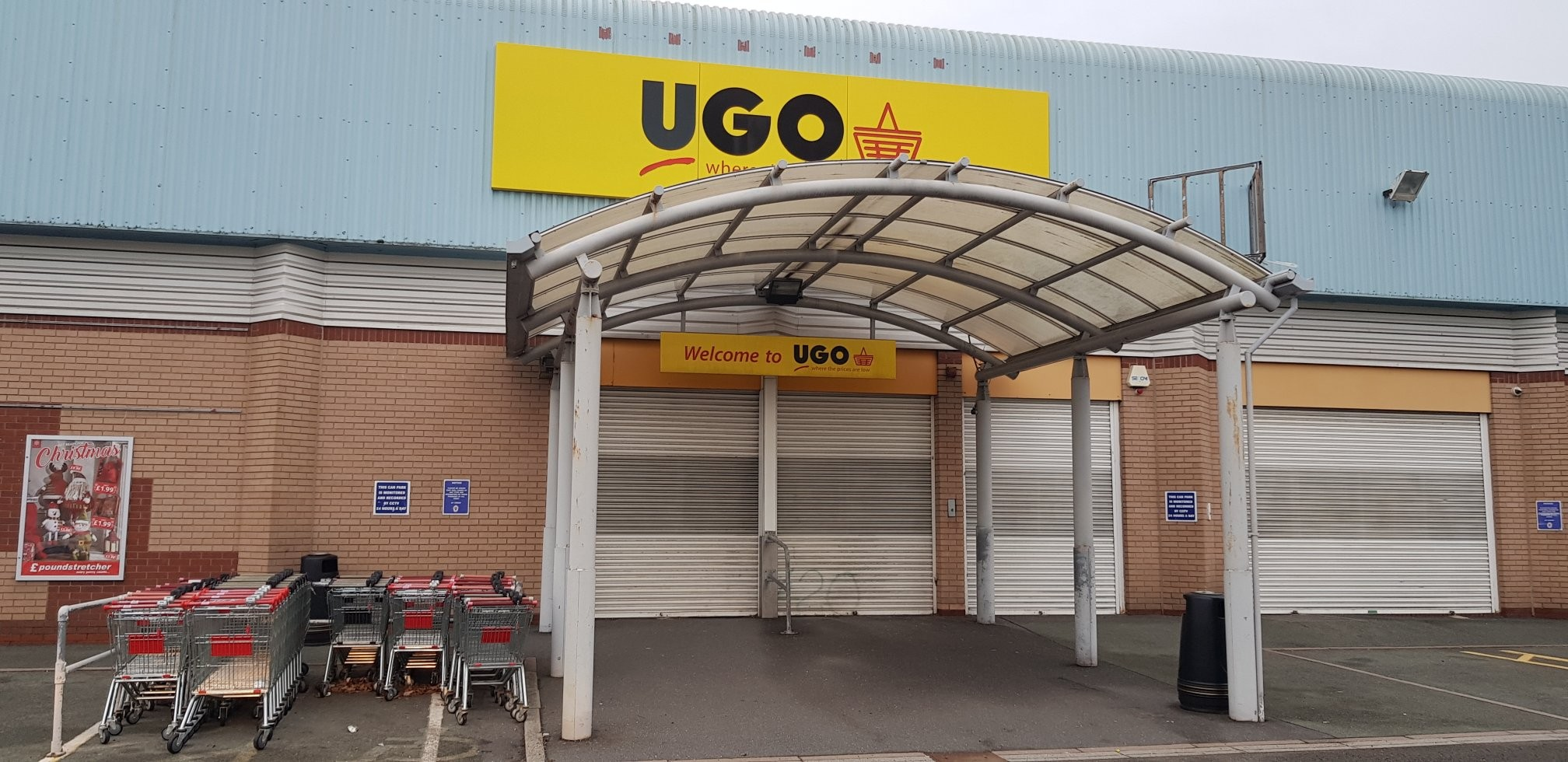
Nuneaton's former Ugo when it sat empty in 2018, which has since been acquired

It acquired twenty mid-size Netto supermarkets in the North and Midlands of England from the chain Asda, and turned them into Ugo stores; these stores were in: Athersley, Ashington, Blackburn, Boothferry, Bradford, Burnley, Bury, Carcroft, Eston, Hartlepool, Hull (two stores), Kirkby, Lundwood, Monk Bretton, Nuneaton, Retford, Rotherham, Stanley and Wavertree.

Additionally, the Haldanes stores in Biddulph, Staffordshire and Broxburn, West Lothian were converted to the Ugo branding; these two stores remained in the ownership of Haldanes Stores, another company in the Haldanes Group. The Ugo strategy was to double Netto's existing core range of branded grocery lines to around 3,000 more items, plus more fresher bakery items from the Haldanes acquired Woodhead Bakery.

Ugo have appeared twice on television in the United Kingdom. It appeared on Channel 4's Come Dine with Me when a contestant was filmed shopping for the programme in the store in Blackburn, and appeared on Channel 4's Facejacker, which aired on 27 March 2012 at 10pm, in the Nuneaton store, when the self service checkout was 'taken over'.

In June 2011, Haldanes Stores went into administration, and its stores closed, including the two stores branded as Ugo. In February 2012, Ugo Stores was itself placed in administration, and the chain was bought by Poundstretcher, in a pre-pack sale, with 18 of the twenty stores to become part of the Poundstretcher chain and the other two (Nuneaton, Hull) to close as Poundstretcher already had stores nearby.

In January 2021, the last remaining vacant Ugo Supermarket space in Nuneaton was purchased after sitting empty for nine years, by independent Midlands-based family-owned retailer, 365 Bargains.
