= Slotsarkaderne =

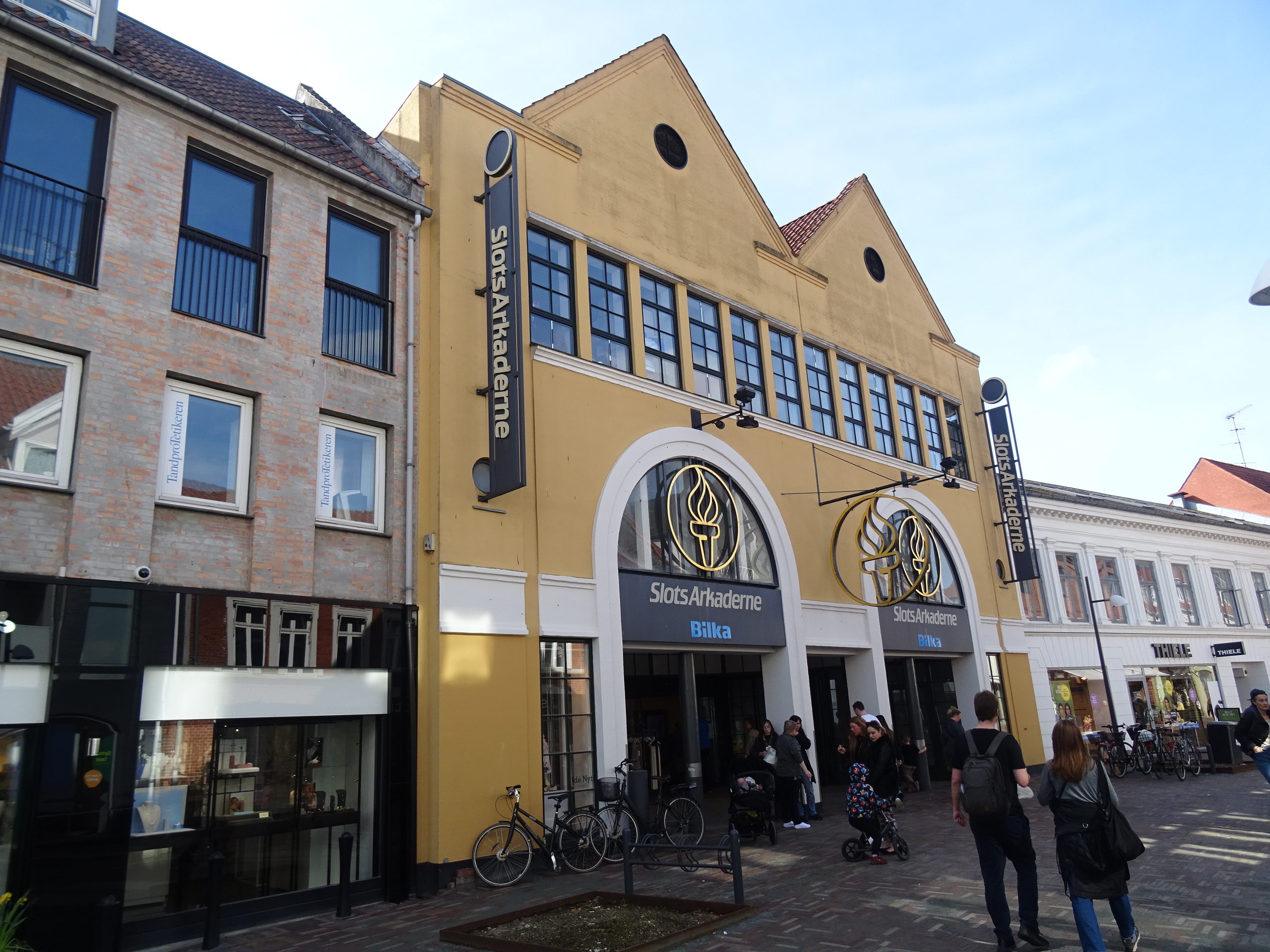
- Slotsarkaderne at Slotsgade.
- Location: Hillerød, Denmark
- Coordinates: 55.9292°N 12.2978°E
- Opened: 1992
- Owner: Danica Ejendomme
- Num. of stores: 60
- Floor area: 24,000 m^{2} (260,000 sq ft)
- Website: slotsarkaderne.dk

Slotsarkaderne (usually styled SlotsArkaderne) is a shopping centre located in Hillerød, Denmark. It has an area of 24,000 m^{2} (260,000 sq ft) and contains 60 stores.

== History ==
Slotsarkaderne was built in 1991–92 to design by Ulrik Plesner. In 2014, Danica published plans to undertake another extension.

== Today ==
Slotsarkederne is owned by Danica Ejendomme and is managed by DEAS. It has an area of 24,000 square metres and contains 60 shops.
