= Salling Group =

Danish retail company

Salling Group A/S
- Formerly: Dansk Supermarked A/S
- Type: Private
- Industry: Retail
- Founded: June 1, 1956; 70 years ago
- Founder: Herman Salling
- Headquarters: Brabrand, Denmark
- Number of locations: 2,100+ (2026)
- Area served: Denmark, Germany, Poland, Baltic states
- Key people: Anders Hagh (President and CEO)
- Revenue: ▲83.168 billion kr. (2025)
- Operating income: ▲3.25 billion kr. (2025)
- Net income: ▼ –662 million kr. (2025)
- Total assets: ▲53.3 billion kr. (2025)
- Total equity: ▲15.8 billion kr. (2025)
- Owner: Salling Fondene
- Number of employees: 69,823 (2026)
- Divisions: Netto; Føtex; Bilka; Salling; Rimi
- Website: sallinggroup.com

Salling Group A/S (formerly Dansk Supermarked A/S) is Denmark's largest retailer, with a market share around 34%. It operates several chains of stores, including Netto, Føtex, Bilka, and Salling. Additionally, it holds franchise rights for Starbucks and Carl's Jr. in Denmark. Salling Group's international operations include Netto, which has expanded into Germany and Poland, and has made two unsuccessful attempts at operating in the United Kingdom. Its stores in Sweden were sold off in 2019. In 2025, it acquired Rimi Baltic from ICA Gruppen, which operated Rimi grocery stores in the Baltic States.

On 1 June 2018, Dansk Supermarked changed its name to Salling Group.

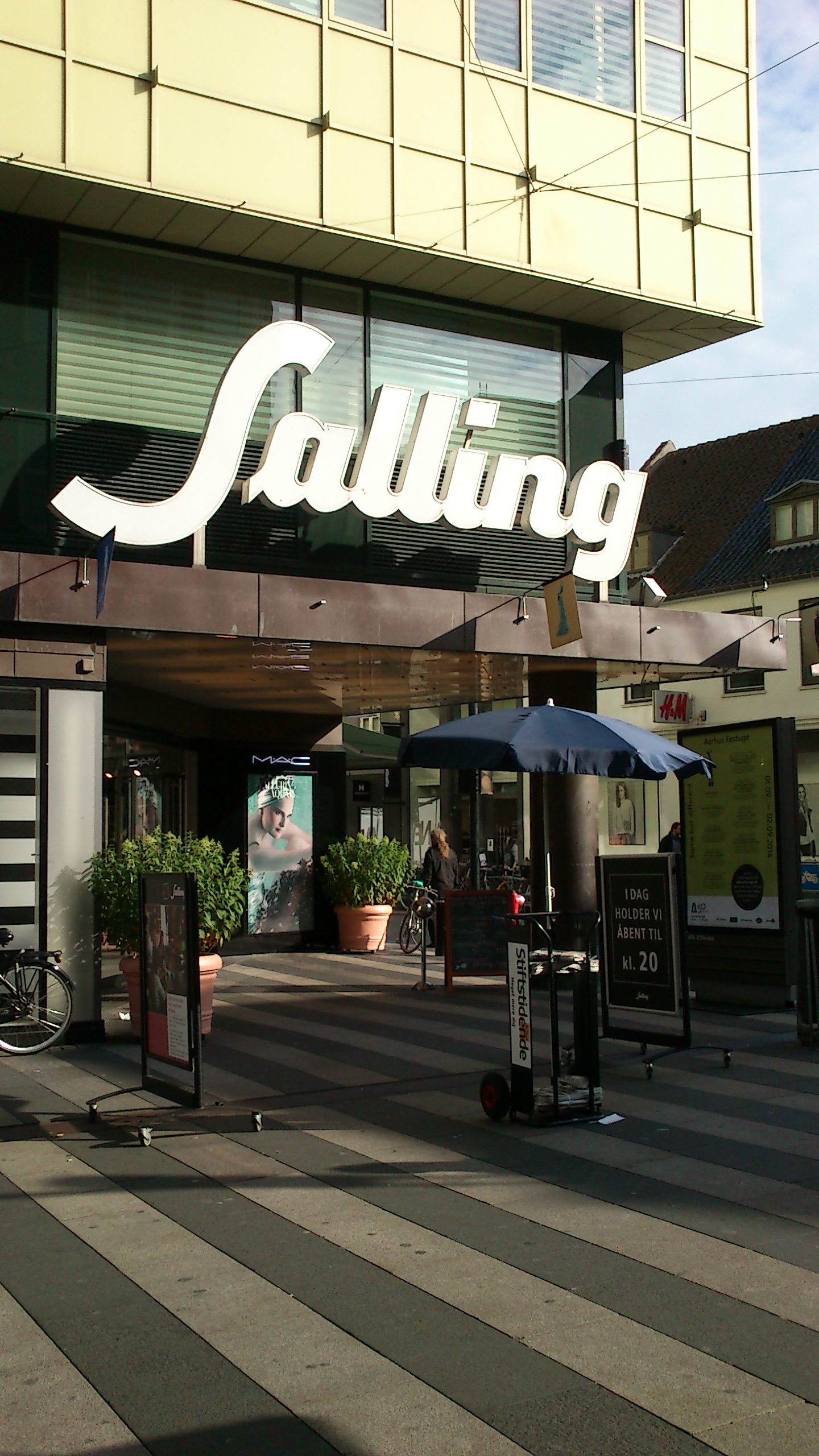
Salling store on Strøget in Aarhus

== History ==
=== The early years ===
The Danish Supermarket was built on the foundation of the Salling department store, created in 1906 by Ferdinand Salling. He worked there until his death in 1953 and he managed to transform his company into public limited company - F. Salling A/S.

After the death of Ferdinand Salling, his son Herman Salling took over the company. He travelled all over the world in search for inspiration and new ideas. After that he decided to focus on department stores, supermarkets and hypermarket chains.

In 1960, Herman Salling opened his first supermarket store Føtex, through his company Jysk Supermarket, which was a completely new type of store for Denmark. The idea behind that store was to provide both food and textiles under one roof.

=== A.P. Møller enters Dansk Supermarked ===
Herman Salling wanted to expand his venture across Europe, so he started looking for partners to provide him extra funding.

Salling found the right partner in 1964 and he made a deal with Arnold Peter Møller, which acquired 50% of the company off him. Møller also suggested that Herman Salling's company - Jysk Supermarket, should change its name to Danish Supermarket A/S.

=== The birth of Bilka ===
In 1970, Danish Supermarked gave the Danes the first discount store in Denmark - Bilka. The first store was located in Tilst, near Aarhus. After the opening of the store, there were more than 50,000 people visiting it every day. At this point, the customers were becoming more and more price conscious. Some of them even had extra freezers at their homes, so that they could buy more goods at the discount store. The idea for the creation of Bilka came from Herman Salling's visit to West Germany. After that he managed to convince his partner, the shipping magnate Mærsk Mc-Kinney Møller, that hypermarkets were the way forward.

=== The launch of Netto ===
In 1981, the first store of the discount supermarket chain Netto was opened in Denmark. The company later expanded into Germany, Poland, Sweden and the United Kingdom. Netto is the only company part of Salling Group to have expanded outside Denmark.

The German Netto stores, set up in 1990, were originally a 75:25 joint venture between Dansk Supermarked and the largest German supermarket chain, Edeka. Dansk Supermarked acquired Edeka's 25% stake in January 2013, enabling it to become a wholly owned subsidiary of Dansk Supermarked. Edeka also owns a separate discount supermarket chain, Netto Marken-Discount, which is completely unrelated to Dansk Supermarked.

The UK Netto stores, also set up in 1990, were later sold to the British supermarket chain Asda, (owned by the United States retailer Walmart), in 2010. However, in 2014, Dansk Supermarked relaunched Netto UK stores as a 50:50 joint venture with another British supermarket chain, J Sainsbury plc. In 2016 Sainsbury closed cooperation with DS and again Netto chain left British market.

The Swedish Netto stores were established in 2002 as a 50:50 joint venture with the Swedish retailer ICA AB. However, ICA later reduced its stake to 5%, meaning that from 2006 Dansk Supermarked had a 95% controlling interest in the Swedish Netto stores. Netto left Sweden in July 2019, when the stores were sold off to Coop Butiker & Stormarknader AB.

=== Expansion into other ventures ===
Tøj & Sko, a clothing and footwear retailer, was also founded in 1981. The stores were closed in 2012.

Dansk Supermarked also launched in 1987 another non-food retailer A-Z. However, by 2014, these A-Z stores had been rebranded to Bilka.

=== Mærsk sells its stake back to Salling ===
As of January 2014, the company was 81% owned by F. Salling Invest A/S and F. Salling Holding A/S (known as the Salling Companies) and 19% owned by A.P. Moller-Maersk Group. On 7 January 2014, A.P. Møller - Mærsk A/S announced that it was selling a 48.68% stake in Dansk Supermarked back to F. Salling Invest A/S and F. Salling Holding A/S (jointly the "Salling Companies"), with an option to buy back the remaining 19% stake in 2019. The remaining stake was bought earlier than expected at the end of 2017.

=== Relaunch of BR toy store chain ===
On January 17, 2019, Salling Group announced the acquisition of some parts of Top-Toy, the bankrupt company behind the toy chains BR and Toys "R" Us in Denmark. The agreement included Top-Toy's entire Danish inventory and the rights to the BR name and brands for a future 25 new stores. Salling Group's CEO, Per Bank, called the deal a "strategically important agreement" that would ensure that Danes could still buy toys in physical stores across the country. However, no decision was made regarding the long-term future of the BR brand. The acquisition did not include Top-Toy's stores or employees, but Salling Group did have 1,500 open positions. Of those, approximately 1,000 were in Denmark, and 60% of those were aimed at young people under 18 or were student positions.

=== Purchase of Rimi Baltic ===
Swedish group ICA Gruppen and Salling Group have agreed on a sale price of retailer Rimi Baltic of 1.3 billion euros, excluding debts, company representatives told the media on March 5, 2025. The European Commission approved the deal on 5 May 2025, with transfer expected to be completed by June 2025. Transaction completed on June 2, 2025.

== Campaigns ==
=== Mini Market ===
The Mini Market (in Danish: Mini Marked) campaign was a largely successful campaign done by Salling Group in the summer of 2019. The campaign revolved around miniature toys shaped and designed like grocery products, such as a toothpaste bottle, a carton of eggs or a deodorant. Customers would receive one of the toys if they purchased more than 100 kr. worth of groceries in a Salling, Føtex or Bilka store. Along with the toys was a collection binder that customers could purchase at stores. It was expected that the toys would be sold until July 4; however, because of the popularity, the expected end date was moved to June 27.

The campaign also received criticism. Throughout the campaign, they received complaints because of the large amounts of plastic they were producing. In response, the press manager for Salling Group, Mads Hvitved Grand, stated that the toys' intention for a long period of use was best met with plastic, and that the company wanted to promote playing with physical toys instead of sitting in front of a screen.

== Current operations ==
Salling Group is Denmark's largest retailer, with a 34.9% market share.

Current stores and restaurants as of 31 December 2025:

Name	Stores	Type
Netto Denmark	578	discount supermarket
Netto Germany	341	discount supermarket
Netto Poland	695	discount supermarket
Bilka	19	hypermarket (superstore)
føtex and føtex food	119	supermarket
Salling	2	department store
BR	31	toy store
Starbucks	16	coffee shop
Carl's Jr.	15	fast-food restaurant
Matinique	4	clothing store
HUGO BOSS	4	clothing store
Rimi Estonia	83	grocery store
Rimi Latvia	145	grocery store
Rimi Lithuania	87	grocery store

== Former operations ==
=== Former stores in Denmark ===
Name	Stores	Type
A-Z	6	non-food shop
Tøj & Sko	37	clothing and footwear stores

=== Former stores outside Denmark ===
Name	Stores	Type
Netto Sweden	163	discount supermarket
Netto UK	209	discount supermarket
