= Herman Salling =

Herman Christian Salling (20 November 1919 – 8 May 2006) was a Danish businessman. He was a pioneer in the department store and retail business in Denmark.

Born in Aarhus, Herman Salling was the son of local merchant Ferdinand Salling (1880–1953) who founded the Salling department store in 1906 in Aarhus. Herman inherited and became director of Salling in 1953. He evolved the business and also started føtex in 1960, the first real supermarket in Denmark. With Danish shipping businessman A.P. Møller, he founded Dansk Supermarked A/S in 1964. In 1970, as part of the Dansk Supermarket Group, Herman Salling launched Bilka, the first hypermarket in Denmark. Bilka is located in Tilst, a western suburb of Aarhus.

== The Salling foundations ==
A memorial fund for Herman's father Ferdinand Salling was established in 1957 and in 1964 Herman Salling established his own foundation. The two foundations are collectively known as "Salling Fondene" (The Salling Foundations) and financially support selected local cultural projects in Aarhus.

One of many donations went to the establishment of "Hermans" in 2013, a cultural venue in Tivoli Friheden, named after Herman Salling himself.

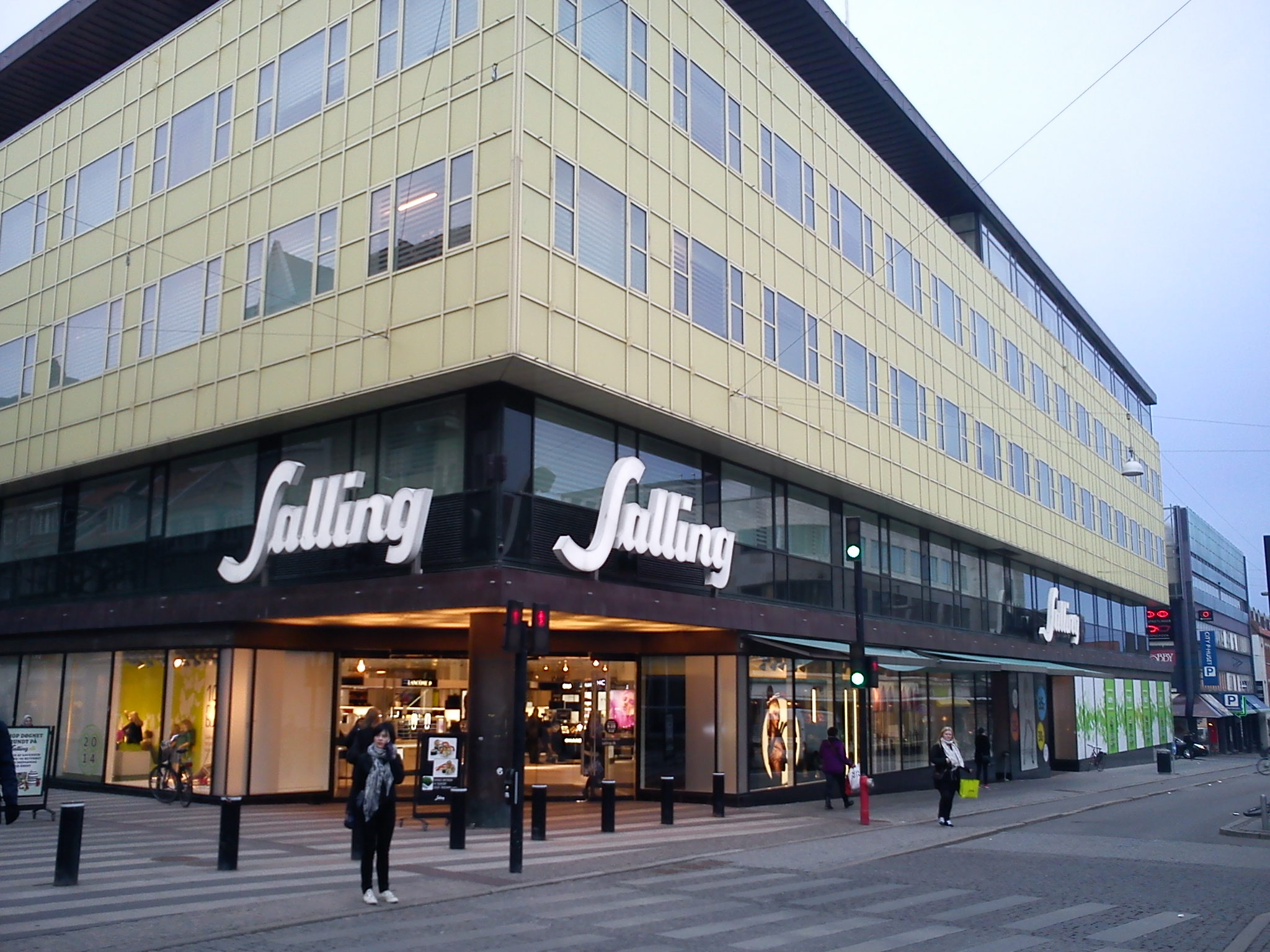
Salling department store

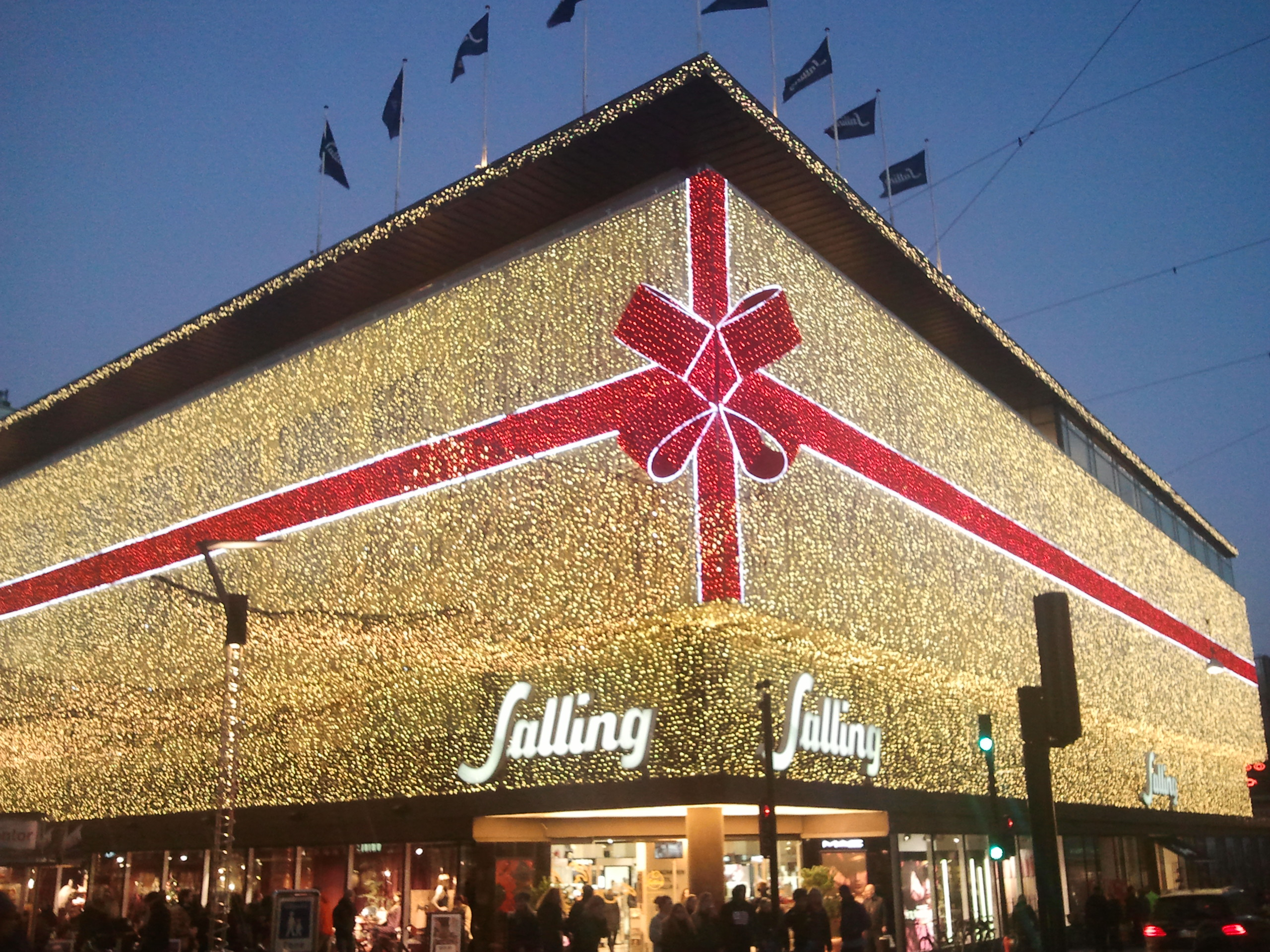
Salling with Christmas decorations (2016)

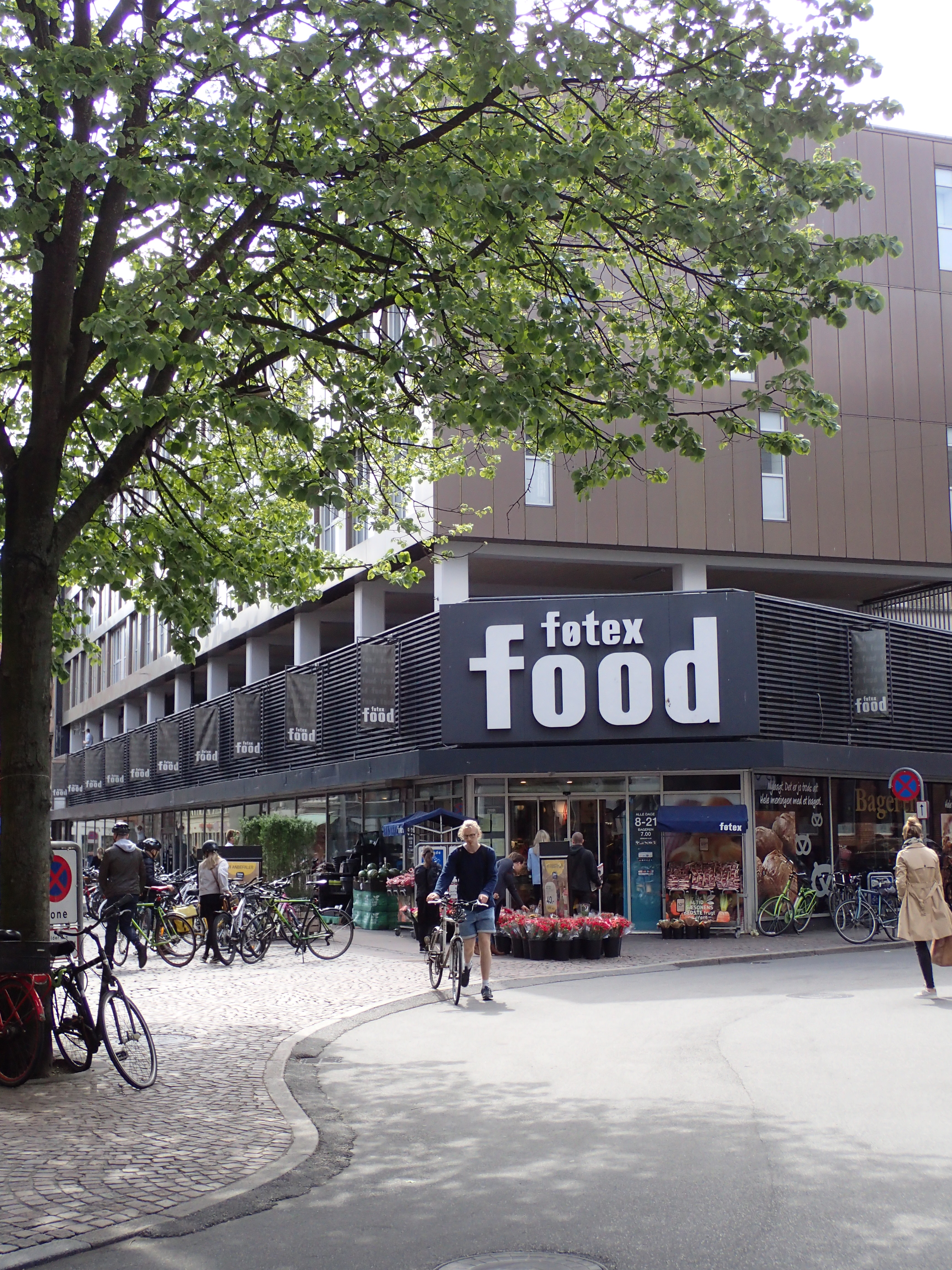
The first føtex supermarket in Denmark, built in 1960

== Sources ==
- Salling.dk: Sallings Historie (in Danish)
