= Dagrofa =

Danish retail company

Dagrofa A/S
- Type: Private
- Industry: Retail, Logistics, Catering
- Predecessors: Dagros A/S, Brdr. Justesen A/S
- Founded: 1983
- Headquarters: Ringsted, Denmark
- Area served: Denmark, Greenland
- Key people: Tomas Pietrangeli
- Brands: Meny; SPAR; Min Købmand; Let-Køb
- Revenue: 20,910 million DKK (2025)
- Operating income: 203 million DKK (2025)
- Net income: 99 million DKK (2025)
- Total assets: 5,767 million DKK (2025)
- Owner: NorgesGruppen (49%) / KFI Erhvervsdrivende Fond (42%) / Franchiseholders (9%)
- Number of employees: 14,500 (2026)
- Subsidiaries: Dagrofa Foodservice; Aarstiderne; Dagrofa Logistik a/s
- Website: www.dagrofa.dk

Dagrofa A/S is a Danish retail company with a market share of around 10% in Denmark as of 2026 and was 20% in 2008. The company controls distribution to franchise stores operating under the SPAR, Meny, Min Købmand and Let-Køb brands in Denmark and owns more than 550 stores.

In 2013, NorgesGruppen bought a 49% share in Dagrofa from Skandinavisk Holding (owner of Scandinavian Tobacco Group). In 2026 Dagrofa is owned by NorgesGruppen, KFI Erhvervsdrivende Fond, and independent grocer's affiliated with the group. NorgesGruppen owns 49%, KFI Erhvervsdrivende Fond owns 41% and the last 9% is owned by the independent grocers.

From 2012 to 2020, Dagrofa recorded losses every year. In 2021, revenue returned to a positive DKK 57 million (7.66 million euros).

On 3 July 2026, Dagrofa bought all of the 16 stores from the supermarket chain ABC Lavpris. Dagrofa´s ambition is to create Denmark´s next national discount supermarket chain

Dagrofa Foodservice is a professional food partner and supplier to the foodservice industry. Dagrofa Foodservice supplies food products and meal solutions to restaurants, hotels, cafés, canteens, large-scale kitchens, and public institutions. The company also operates 30 Cash & Carry stores. Professional customers can shop in person and get advice from experts in the stores.

In 2025, Aarstiderne became part of the Dagrofa Group. Aarstiderne delivers meal kits, groceries, and organic food products directly to consumers and businesses. Aarstiderne´s organic products are now available in MENY stores all across the country.
