= Netto (Denmark) =

Danish chain of discount supermarkets

- Industry: Retail
- Founded: 1 April 1981; 45 years ago in Copenhagen, Denmark
- Headquarters: Køge, Denmark
- Number of locations: 1,536
- Area served: Denmark, Germany, Poland
- Parent: Salling Group
- Website: www.netto.dk

Netto (Danish pronunciation: [ˈnetsʰo]) is a Danish discount supermarket chain operating in Denmark, Germany and Poland. Netto is a part of the Salling Group.

== History ==
=== Denmark ===
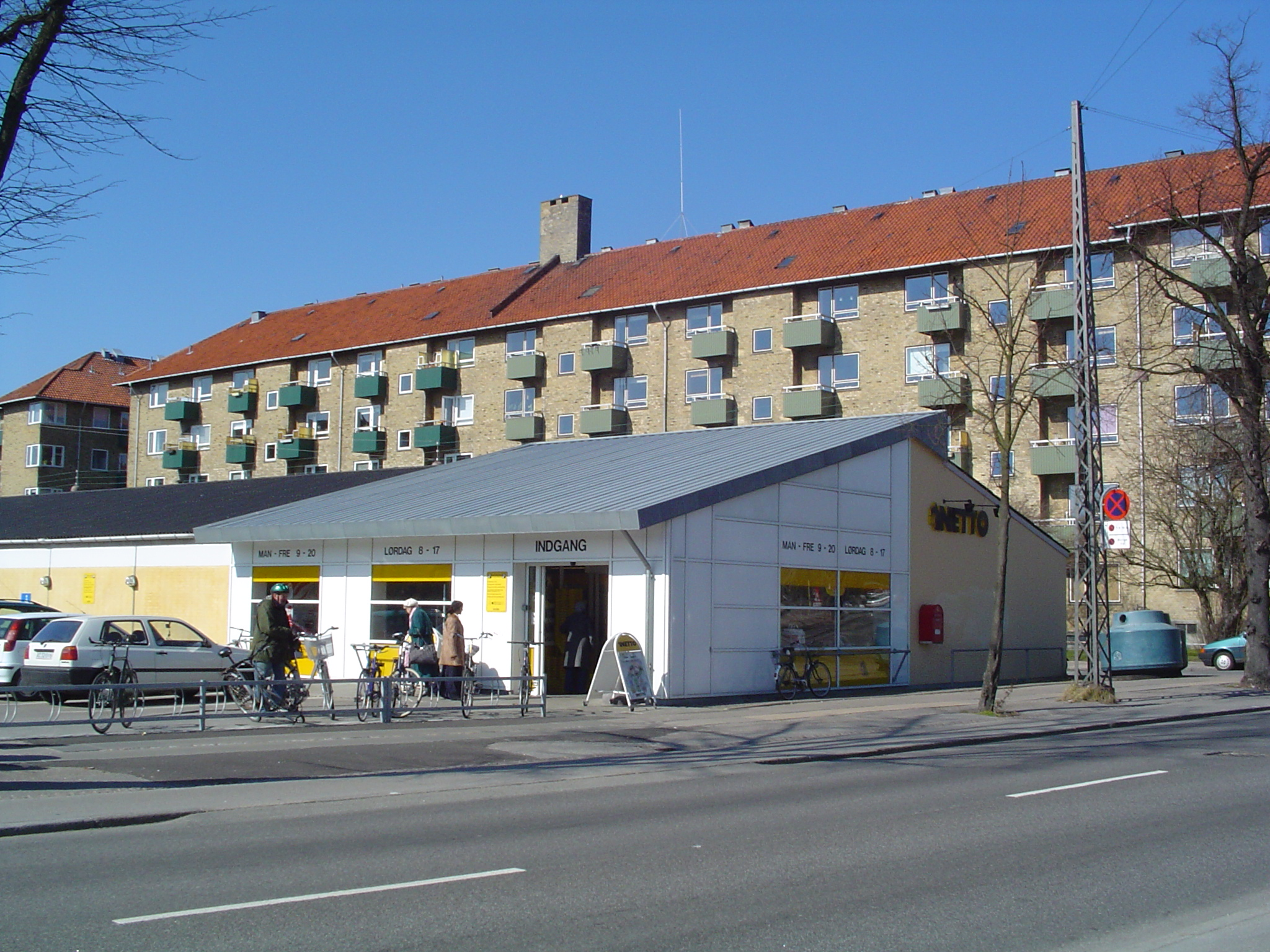
A Netto store at Lygten, in Copenhagen

The first Netto store opened in Copenhagen, Denmark, in 1981. Initially items for sale sat in boxes and on pallets, but the chain quickly expanded and the service level increased. There was a total of around 540 stores in 2023, following Aldi's sale of its stores in Denmark to Netto.

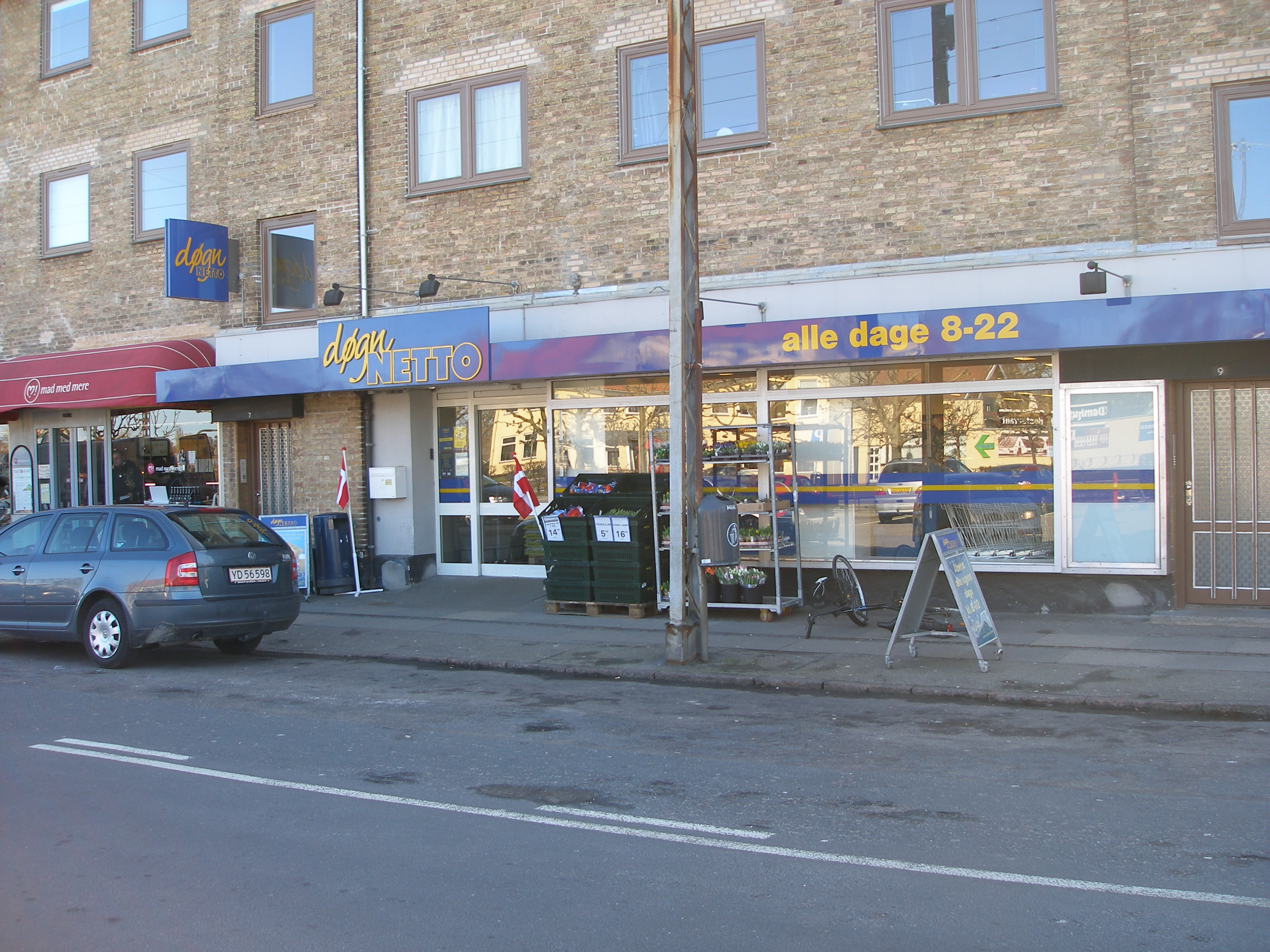
A DøgnNetto on Damhustorvet

Netto also operated a smaller, express version of the store in Denmark, known as "Døgn Netto" ("[24 hour] Day Netto"). Døgn stores offered the same service as regular Netto stores but with fewer products, longer opening hours and higher prices. In 2016, all Døgn Nettos were switched to normal Netto or Føtex Food convenience concept stores.

=== Germany ===
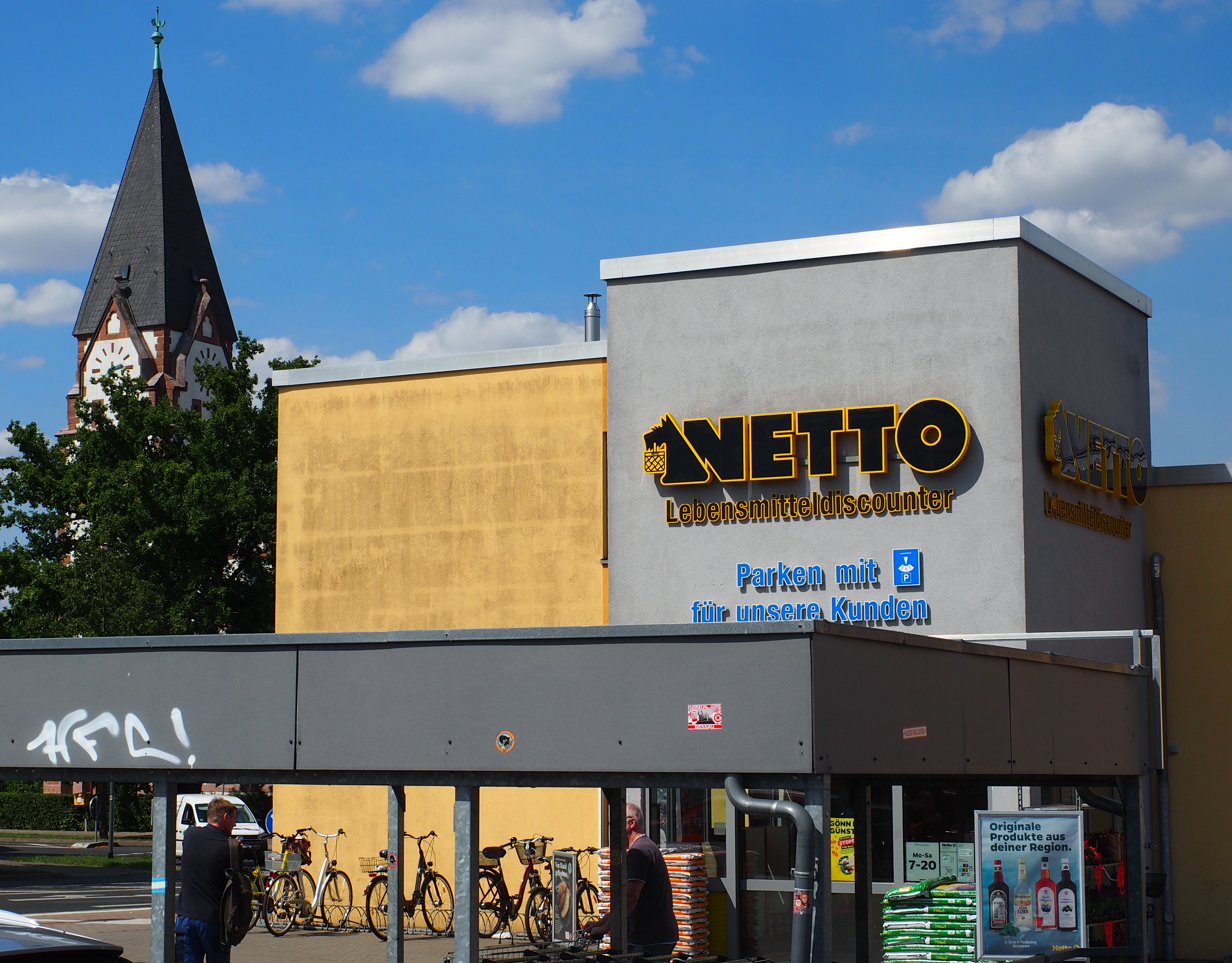
German Netto

In 1990, Netto began a process of internationalisation, and Germany became the second country to gain Netto stores. The first German store was opened in Mecklenburg-Vorpommern, at that time part of East Germany. Netto has since expanded in the states of Brandenburg, Berlin, Hamburg, Lower Saxony, Saxony, Saxony-Anhalt and Schleswig-Holstein, and there were more than 340 stores in Germany as at the end of 2014.

There is a larger chain in Germany, of more than 4,100 stores, Netto Marken-Discount – called "Netto" for short – which is owned by EDEKA and has been in operation since 1984. The two chains are not related.

=== Poland ===
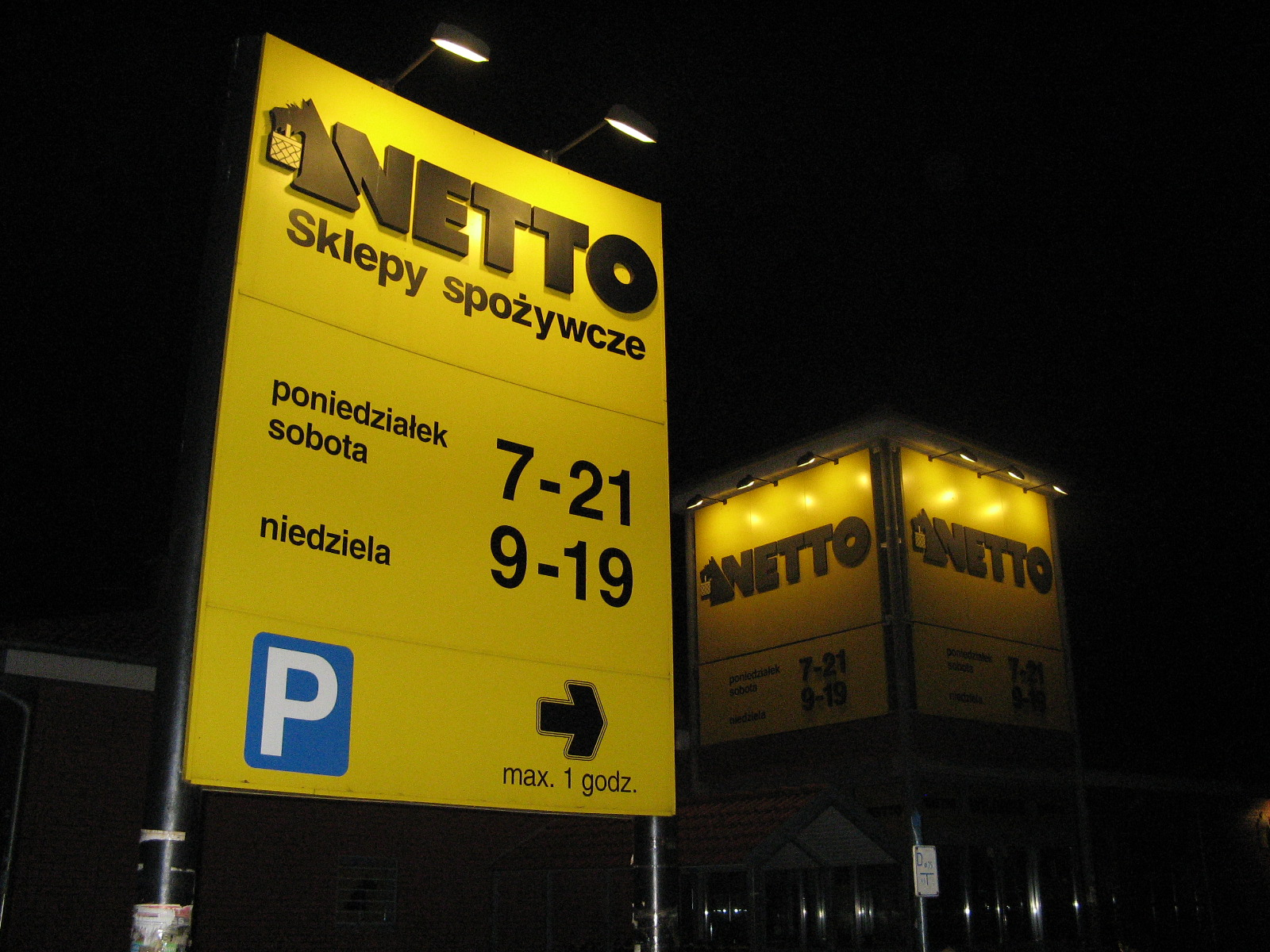
Polish Netto in Bydgoszcz

The first Netto store in Poland opened in Szczecin in 1995. The company's expansion in Poland is concentrated in the west part of the country from Szczecin to Gdańsk (for example in Police and Stargard Szczeciński), and through the country to Bydgoszcz, Poznań, and Zielona Góra.

In 2020, Netto made a substantial expansion by acquiring Polish subsidiary of Tesco with 301 supermarkets and two logistics centers for £181 million. Of these stores, 243 were rebranded as Netto, while the remaining 58 were closed.

=== Sweden ===
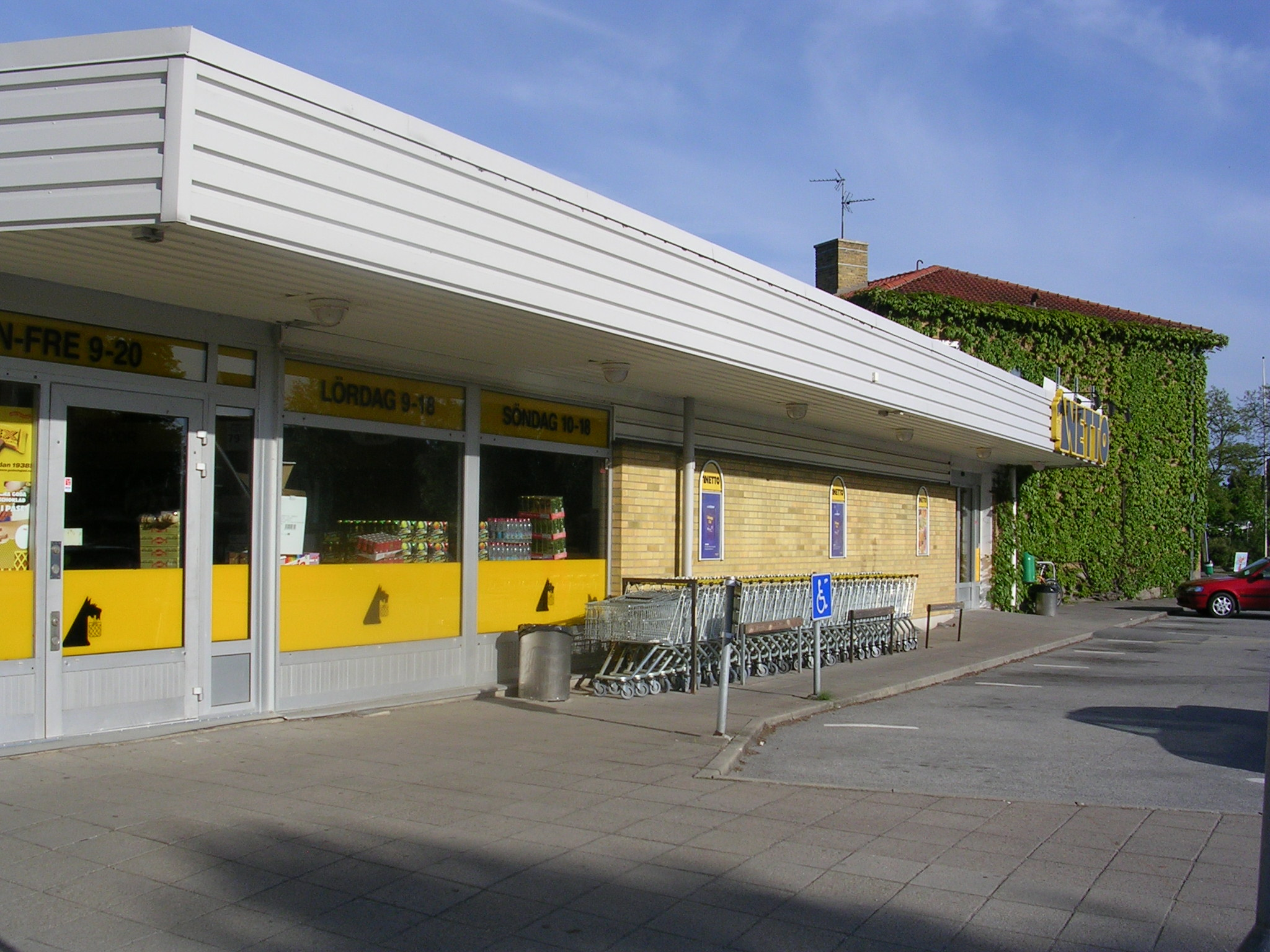
Swedish Netto

The Swedish part of Netto was founded in 2002 as a joint venture between Dansk Supermarked and ICA, called Netto Marknad AB. The co-operation was approved by the European Commission in 2001. The headquarters were established in Halmstad in 2002 and the first store opened in Trelleborg on 8 May that year. A week later, two stores were opened in Lund. Initially, Netto were based solely in the Götaland region but in 2004 opened its first stores in Stockholm. In 2003, the head office moved to Falkenberg, by which time there were 28 stores in the country. As of 2019, this had risen to 163.

In 2006, ICA announced it was pulling out of the joint venture and reducing its stake from 50% to 5%; today, ICA no longer has any stake in the company. Some 21 stores in the Stockholm and Västerås regions transferred to ICA ownership, with most being rebranded to ICA's own formats in 2007.

The reasons for the change were problems in supplying the stores based on Netto's more southern base as well as ICA's desire to focus investment on its own formats. On 10 May 2019, it was announced that Salling Group had signed an agreement with the country's second-largest supermarket chain Coop Sverige on the purchase of the 163 Netto supermarkets in Sweden.

=== United Kingdom ===
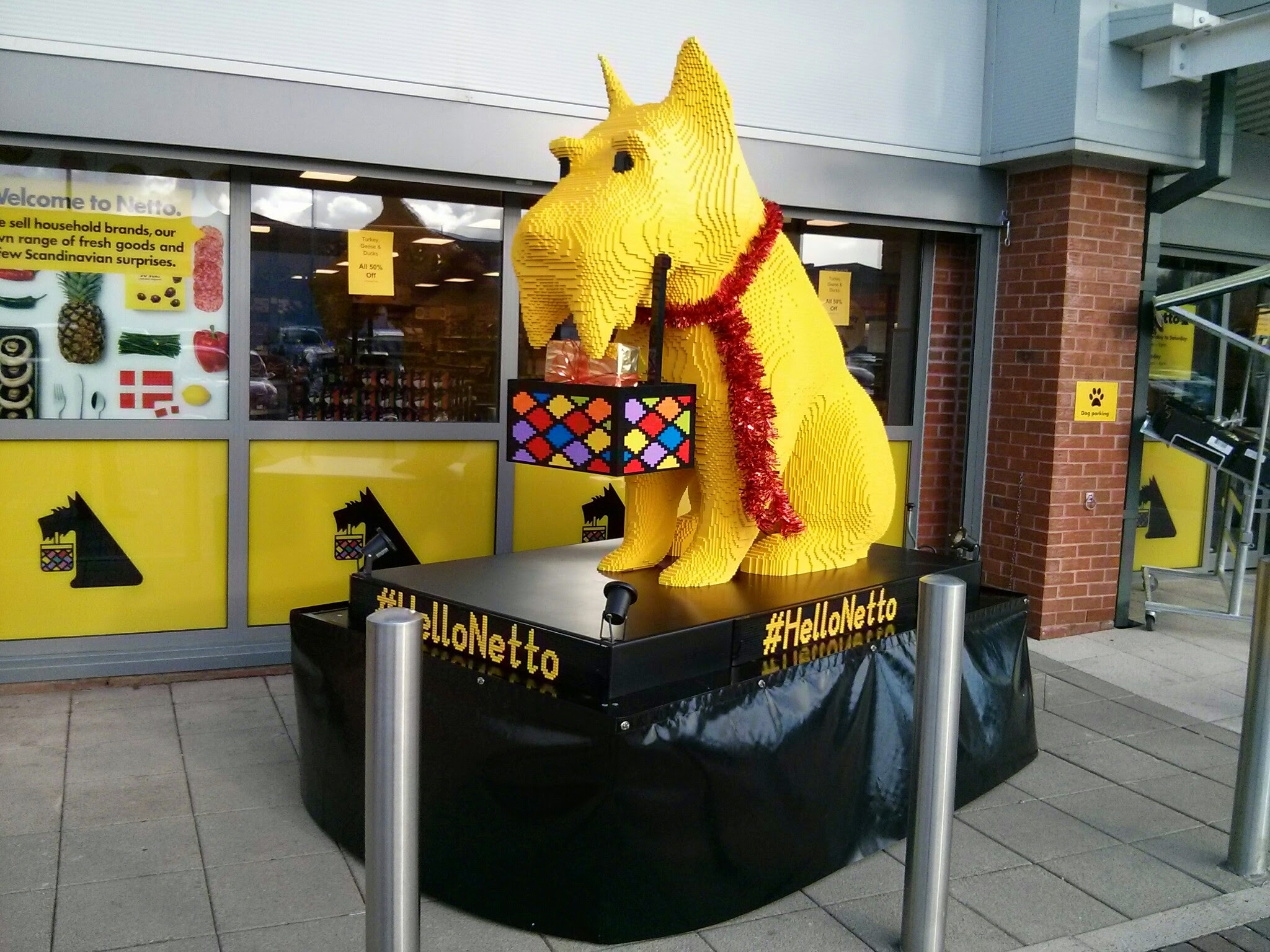
A Lego Netto Dog outside the Ormskirk branch

Netto began operating in the UK in Leeds on 13 December 1990, with the company's UK headquarters located in the town of South Elmsall, West Yorkshire. Netto primarily expanded in central England, before moving into London.

In 2005, plans for a £2 million investment in South Wales were announced, only to be cancelled due to logistical issues, which resulted in the sale of stores in Barry and Caerphilly. 1,700 jobs were promised in the expansion, with only a small number actually being created. In 2010, Netto UK was sold to Asda for £778 million to help Asda increase its smaller store portfolio.

The rebranding of 147 former Netto stores under the Asda brand was completed in late 2011. Competition laws required Asda to sell the remaining 47 stores to other companies, such as Morrisons, new convenience store UGO, and other retailers. In 2014, Dansk Supermarked returned Netto to the UK as a 50:50 joint venture with Sainsbury's. Plans called for one store to be combined with a Sainsbury's. In 2016, the two companies announced they were ending the joint venture and closing the stores. Mike Coupe, chief executive, said: "we have made the difficult decision not to pursue the (Netto) opportunity further, and instead focus on our core business and on the opportunities we will have, following our proposed acquisition of Home Retail Group".

=== Other countries ===
The Netto name is also used in other countries, such as Spain and France, but these stores are independent of the Scandinavian Netto. The Spanish Netto is a chain of convenience stores owned by DinoSol, and the French Netto is a discount chain owned by Les Mousquetaires.

== Geographic coverage ==
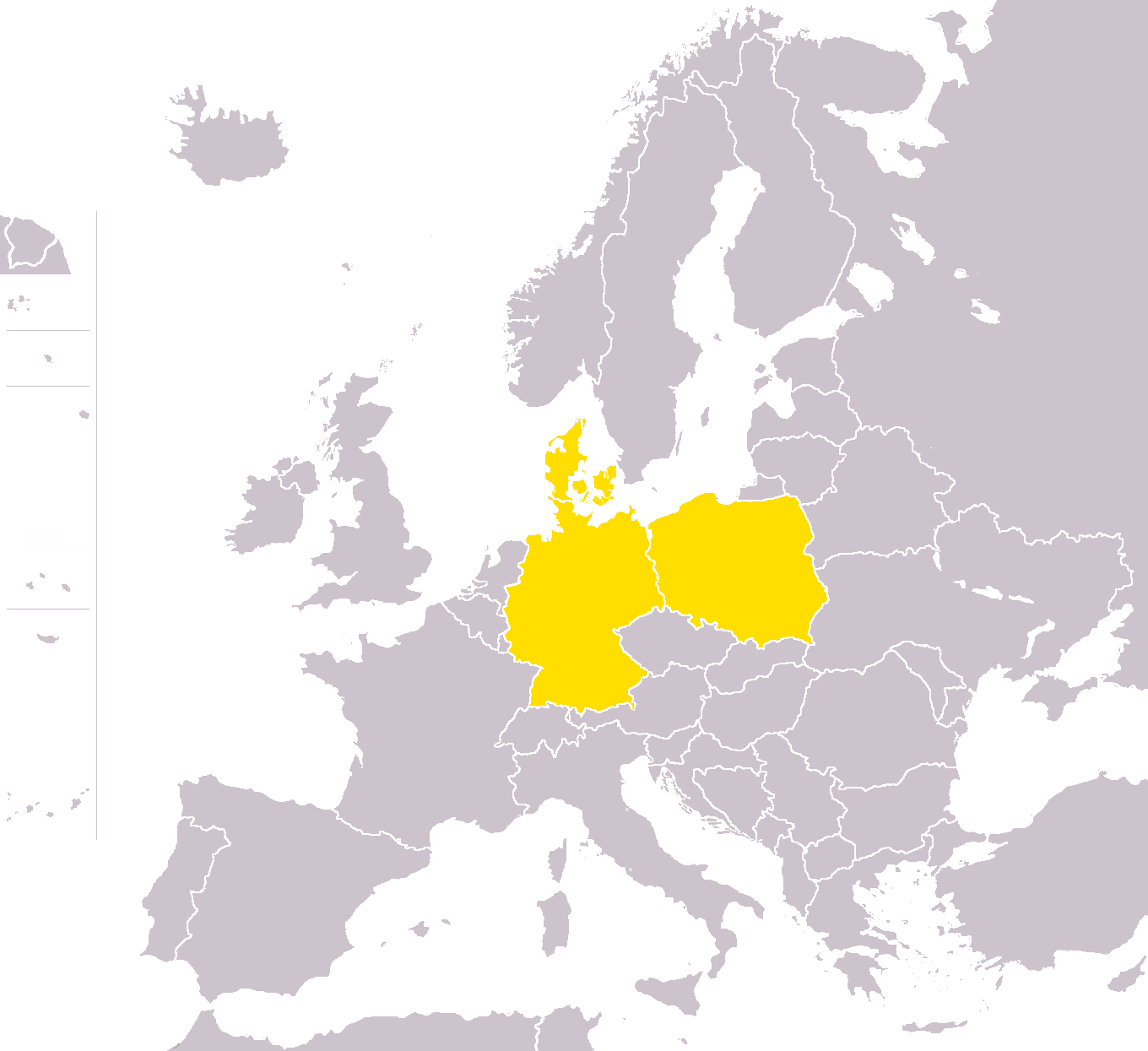
The countries in which Netto operates are shown in yellow.

List of Netto supermarket chains as of 2024.

Country	Since	Stores
Denmark	1981	573
Germany	1990	341
Poland	1995	687
