= List of companies of Norway =

Location of Norway

Norway is a sovereign and unitary monarchy whose territory comprises the western portion of the Scandinavian Peninsula plus the island Jan Mayen and the archipelago of Svalbard.

The country maintains a combination of market economy and a Nordic welfare model with universal health care and a comprehensive social security system. Norway has extensive reserves of petroleum, natural gas, minerals, lumber, seafood, fresh water and hydropower. The petroleum industry accounts for around a quarter of the country's gross domestic product (GDP). On a per-capita basis, Norway is the world's largest producer of oil and natural gas outside the Middle East.

For further information on the types of business entities in this country and their abbreviations, see "Business entities in Norway".

== Largest firms ==
This list shows firms in the Fortune Global 500, which ranks firms by total revenues reported before March 31, 2017. Only the top five firms (if available) are included as a sample.

Rank	Image	Name	2016 revenues (US$M)	Employees	Notes
207		Equinor	45,873	20,539	Multinational oil and gas firm operating in 36 countries. Significant declines in revenues have led to a drop from their high of 36 on the list to the current position of 207.

== Notable firms ==
This list includes notable companies with primary headquarters located in the country. The industry and sector follow the Industry Classification Benchmark taxonomy. Organizations which have ceased operations are included and noted as defunct.

Notable companies Status: P=Private, S=State; A=Active, D=Defunct
Name	Industry	Sector	Headquarters	Founded	Notes	Status	
AF Group	Industrials	Heavy construction	Oslo	1985	Engineering and construction	P	A
Aker ASA	Conglomerates	-	Oslo	2004	Holding company	P	A
Aker BioMarine	Consumer goods	Farming & fishing	Oslo	2006	Fishing and biotech, part of Aker ASA	P	A
Aker Floating Production	Industrials	Transportation services	Oslo	2006	Logistics and support, part of Aker ASA	P	A
Aker Solutions	Oil & gas	Exploration & production	Fornebu	2008	Oil, part of Aker ASA	P	A
Arthur Soltvedt Møbelfabrikk	Consumer goods	Household goods	Follese	1942	Furniture, defunct 2011	P	D
Bama Gruppen	Consumer goods	Food products	Oslo	1886	Produce	P	A
Bergen Engines	Industrials	Industrial machinery	Bergen	1943	Diesel and gas engine manufacturer	P	A
Bertel O. Steen	Industrials	Diversified industrials	Lørenskog	1901	Trading	P	A
Bonheur	Conglomerates	-	Oslo	1897	Holding company	P	A
Borgestad	Conglomerates	-	Skien	1904	Holding company	P	A
Borregaard	Basic materials	Specialty chemicals	Sarpsborg	1889	Chemicals	P	A
Cermaq	Consumer goods	Farming & fishing	Oslo	1995	Fishing	P	A
Coop Norge	Consumer services	Broadline retailers	Oslo	1906	Retail cooperatives	P	A
DNB Bank	Financials	Investment services	Oslo	1822	Financial services	P	A
DNV GL	Industrials	Business support services	Bærum	1864	Inspections	P	A
Elkjøp	Consumer goods	Consumer electronics	Lørenskog	1962	Consumer electronics	P	A
Equinor	Oil & gas	Exploration & production	Stavanger	1972	State-owned oil and gas producer	S	A
Ferd	Financials	Investment services	Bærum	2001	Investments	P	A
Fjordkraft	Utilities	Electricity	Bergen	1996	Power	P	A
Framo	Industrials	Industrial machinery	Bergen	1938	Pumps	P	A
GC Rieber	Conglomerates	-	Bergen	1879	Holding company	P	A
Gjensidige	Financials	Full line insurance	Oslo	1923	Insurance	P	A
Hafslund	Utilities	Conventional electricity	Oslo	1898	Power	P	A
Havfisk	Consumer goods	Food products	Ålesund	2005	Seafood, part of Lerøy	P	A
Helgø Matsenter	Consumer services	Food retailers & wholesalers	Stavanger	1958	Supermarkets	P	A
Helly Hansen	Consumer goods	Clothing & accessories	Oslo	1877	Clothing and sports equipment	P	A
Jotun	Basic materials	Specialty chemicals	Sandefjord	1926	Paints, coatings	P	A
Kommunal Landspensjonskasse	Financials	Full line insurance	Oslo	1949	Mutual insurance	P	A
Kongsberg Gruppen	Industrials	Defense	Kongsberg	1814	Defense	P	A
Lerøy	Consumer goods	Food products	Bergen	1939	Seafood	P	A
Luxo	Consumer goods	Durable household products	Oslo	1934	Lamps	P	A
Moelven Industrier	Industrials	Diversified industrials	Ringsaker	1899	Industrial	P	A
Møller Mobility Group	Consumer goods	Auto services	Oslo	1936	Car retail and services	P	A
Mowi	Consumer goods	Farming & fishing	Bergen	2006	Fish farming, seafood	P	A
Nammo	Industrials	Defense	Raufoss	1998	Ammunition	S	A
Norconsult	Industrials	Business support services	Sandvika	1929	Engineering consulting	P	A
Nordic Semiconductor	Technology	Electronic components	Trondheim	1983	Electronics	P	A
NorgesGruppen	Consumer services	Food retailers & wholesalers	Oslo	1994	Wholesaler	P	A
Norsk Hydro	Basic materials	Aluminum	Oslo	1905	Aluminum	P	A
Norske Skog	Basic materials	Paper	Lysaker	1962	Pulp and paper	P	A
Nortura	Consumer goods	Food products	Oslo	2006	Cooperative	P	A
OneSubsea	Energy	Oil equipment and services	Oslo	2012	Oilfield equipment and services	P	A
O. N. Sunde	Conglomerates	-	Oslo	1988	Shipping, real estate, consumer goods	P	A
Odfjell	Industrials	Marine transportation	Bergen	1914	Shipping	P	A
Opera Software	Technology	Software	Oslo	1995	Software	P	A
Orkla Group	Conglomerates	-	Oslo	1654	Consumer goods, mining, financials	P	A
Petroleum Geo-Services	Oil & gas	Exploration & production	Oslo	1991	Oilfields	P	A
Posten Norge	Industrials	Delivery services	Oslo	1647	Postal	S	A
Reitan Group	Consumer services	Broadline retailers	Trondheim	1948	Retailer	P	A
Scandinavian Bunkering	Basic materials	Specialty chemicals	Tønsberg	1993	Industrial lubricants	P	A
Skagerak Energi	Utilities	Electricity	Porsgrunn	2001	Power	P	A
Snøhetta	Industrials	Business support services	Oslo	1989	Architecture	P	A
SpareBank 1	Financials	Banks	Oslo	1996	Bank	P	A
Star Shipping	Industrials	Marine transportation	Bergen	1961	Shipping	P	A
Statkraft	Utilities	Conventional electricity	Oslo	1986	State-owned electrical	S	A
Statnett	Utilities	Conventional electricity	Oslo	1992	Power grid	S	A
Storebrand	Financials	Consumer finance	Lysaker	1767	Financial services	P	A
Synnøve Finden	Consumer goods	Food products	Oslo	1996	Food	P	A
Tandberg	Consumer goods	Consumer electronics	Lysaker	1933	Electronics, defunct 2010	P	D
Telenor	Telecommunications	Fixed line telecommunications	Fornebu	1970	Telecommunications	S	A
Telia Norge	Telecommunications	Mobile telecommunications	Oslo	1993	Telecommunications	P	A
Thin Film Electronics ASA	Industrials	Electronic equipment	Oslo	2005	Electronics	P	A
Tine	Consumer goods	Food products	Oslo	1928	Dairy	P	A
Tinfos	Utilities	Alternative electricity	Notodden	1894	Hydropower development and generation	P	A
Torvald Klaveness Group	Industrials	Marine transportation	Oslo	1946	Shipping	P	A
Ulefos Jernværk	Basic materials	Metal fabricating	Ulefoss	1657	Iron foundry	P	A
Ulstein	Industrials	Shipbuilding	Ulstein Municipality	1917	Shipbuilding	P	A
Varner-Gruppen	Consumer goods	Clothing & accessories	Oslo	1962	Textiles	P	A
Veidekke	Industrials	Heavy construction	Oslo	1936	Construction	P	A
Vy	Industrials	Railroads	Oslo	1996	Railway	S	A
Wilh. Wilhelmsen	Industrials	Marine transportation	Lysaker	1861	Maritime industry	P	A
Yara International	Basic materials	Specialty chemicals	Oslo	1905	Chemicals	P	A

== See also ==
- List of the largest companies of Norway
- List of banks in Norway
- List of government enterprises of Norway
- List of companies listed on Oslo Axess
- List of airlines of Norway
- List of bus companies of Norway
- List of supermarket chains in Norway
