= List of the largest companies of Norway =

This list of the largest companies of Norway contains the 500 largest companies in Norway by revenue. Information is provided on revenue, operating income, net income and number of employees. Financial amounts are in millions of Norwegian kroner (1 US dollar = 8.85 kroner as of 12/02/2022). The information provided for each company includes subsidiaries. Also on the list are subsidiaries of foreign companies. The list is based on the audited accounts for 2006.

Company	Revenue	Operating income	Net income	Employees
Equinor	431,112	114,449	39,045	21,213
Norsk Hydro asa	196,234	52,224	17,224	33,218
Telenor asa	91,077	14,721	18,535	31,500
Aker asa	79,892	3,508	3,942	35,816
Orkla asa	52,683	4,480	11,263	28,663
Aker Kværner asa	50,592	0	3,942	22,722
Total E&P Norge as	50,577	36,261	8,787	241
ExxonMobil Exploration and Production Norway as	49,680	35,546	8,632	0
Yara International asa	48,261	3,352	4,210	7060
Esso Norge as	45,408	297	306	890
Kommunal Landspensjonskasse	43,581	5,086	5,086	312
NorgesGruppen asa	36,631	1,102	866	9,255
Storebrand asa	34,074	5,549	1,505	1,305
Norske Skogindustrier asa	28,812	-2,527	-2,809	9,372
DnB NOR asa	28,439	14,066	11,808	11,993
Helse Øst rfh	26,685	-831	-747	0
a/s Norske Shell	26,336	8,663	4,334	673
Aker Yards asa	25,861	1,245	1,036	0
Posten Norge as	23,668	1,313	856	20,541
Coop Norge as	21,884	243	160	1,635
Coop NKL ba	21,536	41	111	56
ConocoPhillips Scandinavia as	21,176	16,414	3,841	3
Reitangruppen as	19,875	1,236	880	2,993
Eni Norge as	18,766	13,562	3,851	121
Helse Sør rhf	18,176	-986	-1,062	311
Tine ba	18,088	346	425	390
Veidekke asa	16,442	712	722	6,351
Statkraft as	16,225	9,952	6,285	1,930
Nortura ba	14,926	133	106	0
Norske ConocoPhillips as	14,824	10,665	2,878	0
Helse Vest rhf	14,214	-880	-914	20,578
Gjensidige Forsikring	14,201	1,169	3,264	2,242
ExxonMobil Production Norway Inc	13,550	11,281	3,017	0
Schibsted asa	11,648	2,495	2,225	2,701
Møllergruppen as	11,479	625	461	2,222
Helse Midt-Norge rhf	11,049	-880	-920	16,097
ICA Norge as	11,009	200	179	4,043
SAS Braathens as	10,828	259	143	3,159
Hafslund asa	10,796	12,471	11,651	2,418
BP Norge as	9,971	6,958	1,955	603
Skanska Norge as	9,873	522	492	4,315
Norsk Tipping a/s	9,798	2,749	2,838	345
Livsforsikringsselskapet Nordea Liv Norge as	9,751	506	631	175
SpareBank 1 Gruppen as	9,652	945	1,016	0
Helse Nord rhf	9,247	54	-717	171
Vy	9,167	668	507	0
Aktieselskapet Vinmonopolet	9,161	90	87	1,702
Expert asa	9,032	315	234	1,266
Ementor asa	8,747	-43	-43	3,127
Rederiaksjeselskapet Torvald Klaveness	8,587	0	527	150
O. N. Sunde a/s	8,397	495	195	6151
Petroleum Geo-Services asa	8,387	2,687	1,913	0
Elkjøp Grossist as	8,370	73	33	0
Bertel O Steen as	7,958	350	271	2,168
Jotun a/s	7,732	644	330	881
Nordea Bank Norge as	7,643	3,379	3,082	3,505
Varner-Gruppen as	7,609	895	648	7,442
Cermaq asa	7,553	1,287	937	
Vesta Forsikring as	7,358	1,251	1,171	0
Netcom asa	7,315	2,109	1,527	0
Stiftelsen Det Norske Veritas	7,297	794	545	6,765
Odfjell asa	6,977	1,001	743	567
Statnett sf	6,848	580	303	0
Kongsberg Gruppen asa	6,720	448	249	0
Moelven Industrier asa	6,692	373	239	3,175
Rolls-Royce Marine as	6,665	20	56	2,142
Ferd Holding as	6,602	1,192	084	2,253
National Oilwell Norway as	6,468	607	435	997
Bama Gruppen as	6,411	362	261	1,651
Wilh. Wilhelmsen asa	6,249	1,884	1,474	13,500
Scandinavian Bunkering as	6,243	40	20	15
ABB Holding as	6,218	374	314	0
Star Shipping a/s	6,108	1	10	94
Laco as	6,103	0	0	0
Tinfos as	6,080	185	211	500
Ullevål Universitetssykehus hf	6,071	-135	-141	9,113
Rikshospitalet-Radiumhospitalet hf	6,035	-209	-223	7,865
Avinor as	6,018	941	432	2,588
Enterprise Oil Norge as	5,978	3,297	1,596	0
Mesta as	5,938	-312	-190	3,293
NMD Grossisthandel	5,897	182	140	350
EDB Business Partner asa	5,882	310	223	3,840
Felleskjøpet Agri ba	5,801	247	149	899
Krafts Foods as	5,800	570	341	0
Arrow Electronics Norwegian Holdings as	5,770	192	78	515
Marine Harvest asa	5,655	835	1,853	858
Lerøy Seafood Group asa	5,615	769	652	1,149
Apokjeden as	5,592	325	221	86
YX Energi Norge as	5,510	159	126	
AF Gruppen asa	5,357	191	134	1,793
Siemens as	5,336	241	168	2,371
Leif Høegh & Co Shipping as	5,295	176	266	
Umoe as	5,272	17	723	0
GE Healthcare as	5,269	2,020	1,531	900
Elkjøp Norge Grossist as	5,255	692	513	0
NCC Construction as	5,215	0	0	1,572
ISS Facility Services as	5,132	274	146	13,270
Kistefos as	4,777	288	158	17
Bergesen Worldwide Gas asa	4,678	1,658	1,433	0
Idemitsu Petroleum Norge as	4,592	1,966	491	0
Agder Energi as	4,584	1,515	607	924
Color Group asa	4,464	264	121	3,500
Renewable Energy Corporation asa	4,334	1,574	458	880
Optimera as	4,310	173	107	1,860
Rieber & søn asa	4,263	379	25	0
IKEA Handel og Eiendom as	4,254	414	220	0
Frank Mohn as	4,225	1,060	1,164	0
Byggmakker Norge as	4,202	67	178	42
Camillo Eitzen & Co	4,194	353	179	0
Fred Olsen Energy asa	4,048	1,209	973	11
Den Norske Stats Husbank	4,020	0	-12	364
Fjordkraft as	4,006	58	58	102
Tomra Systems asa	3,965	655	439	2,006
Home Invest as	3,948	289	267	5,381
Elkjøp Norge as	3,900	97	66	1,616
Hess Norges as	3,891	2,611	694	5
Kverneland Group	3,825	-168	-355	2,615
Norsk Rikskringkasting as	3,823	-21	0	3,444
Toyota Norge as	3,808	128	84	88
Polimoon Group as	3,716	136	43	0
Adecco Norge as	3,644	136	91	6,000
Brødrene Dahl a/s	3,629	300	205	671
ErgoGroup as	3,620	215	0	2,098
Bergenshalvøens Kommunale Kraftselskap as	3,554	1,521	836	1,008
Lyse Kraft	3,541	1,645	670	621
Thon Holding as	3,538	813	449	123
Hurtigruten	3,501	134	-95	2,345
Aweco Group Holding	3,417	2,037	1,642	1,095
A-Pressen as	3,398	220	163	2,643
Eidsiva Energi as	3,381	674	373	800
H & M Hennes & Mauritz as	3,375	928	691	2,614
Talisman Energy Norge as	3,342	1,107	197	81
Pareto as	3,276	2,324	1,098	283
Spencer Holding as	3,237	2,324	420	283
Acergy Norway as	3,225	415	296	634
Løvenskiold-Væke as	3,209	154	93	17
Vitusapotek as	3,200	34	26	1,300
Odfjell Drilling as	3,199	192	144	1,889
SIBA Norge filial av SIBA AB Sverige	3,192	14	21	130
Eltek asa	3,121	189	106	848
DOF asa	3,010	875	657	0
Baker Hughes Norge as	2,997	554	350	963
Tele2 Norge as	2,983	105	82	49
Norwegian Air Shuttle asa	2,941	-30	-21	711
Volvo Personbiler Norge as	2,937	15	17	0
Nexans Norway as	2,922	2,503	1,964	838
Coop Trondheim og Omeng ba	2,872	143	165	1,153
Kongsberg Automotive Holding asa	2,863	276	156	2,727
Alliance Unichem Norge as	2,849	50	22	0
Felleskjøpet Trondheim	2,839	19	6	648
Stiftelsen Norsk Rikstoto	2,821	150	0	75
YIT Building Systems as	2,788	103	70	2,448
Gresvig asa	2,783	184	113	0
Norsk Scania as	2,782	123	97	793
Hewlett Packard Norge as	2,738	106	80	412
Borregaard Industries Limited	2,725	348	227	952
Ringnes as	2,704	220	171	1,517
Tandberg asa	2,690	524	391	681
Canica as	2,681	-59	602	17
Peterson as	2,669	62	-320	0
Skagerak Energi	2,662	1,397	842	759
Tiger as	2,658	2	1	1,250
Troms Kraft as	2,650	285	124	433
Veolia Miljø as	2,639	143	77	1,131
Skretting as	2,613	-171	-170	206
Technip Norge as	2,609	211	146	237
Fokus Bank	2,598	0	0	0
Validus as	2,593	125	75	523
Statsbygg	2,570	1,317	0	675
Fesil asa	2,557	40	11	0
Norsk Stål as	2,554	217	153	250
Halliburton as	2,542	205	169	950
TGS-NOPEC Geophysical Company asa	2,537	1,418	967	466
E-CO Energi as	2,525	1,789	647	209
Ekornes asa	2,507	513	343	1,545
ConocoPhillips Norge	2,486	-24	6,774	1,640
Bladcentralen ans	2,481	0	2	153
International Business Machines as	2,430	79	51	959
Widerøe's Flyveselskap as	2,427	42	14	1,398
DONG E&P Norge as	2,391	1,165	531	35
Aker Universitetssykehus	2,391	14	25	0
Oslo Bolig og Sparelag	2,352	0	486	810
Prosafe se	2,339	960	819	800
TV 2 Gruppen as	2,313	26	107	715
Bilia Personbil as	2,311	21	-2	554
Visma as	2,305	216	129	
Bømmeløy as	2,291	374	269	0
Grieg Maturitas as	2,290	437	463	330
Ruukki Norge as	2,277	177	157	226
Sunnmøre og Romsdal Fiskesalslag al	2,277	1	3	0
Fjord1 Nordvestlandske as	2,270	112	59	2,352
Kleven Maritime as	2,257	34	16	294
Komplett asa	2,249	85	66	0
Sparebank 1 SR-Bank	2,247	0	914	916
Tandberg Television asa	2,245	353	531	0
E A Smith as	2,244	97	57	425
Sparebanken Nord Norge	2,215	929	767	750
Bauda as	2,212	102	84	700
Kruse Smith as	2,211	91	85	658
Coca-Cola Drikker as	2,194	93	80	0
Onninen as	2,138	28	2	350
Eramet Norway as	2,137	347	247	455
Södra Cell Tofte as	2,133	-74	-90	0
as Agra Industrier	2,132	230	168	877
Reinertsen as	2,130	23	17	0
as Bache	2,123	93	87	0
Skjeggerød as	2,122	0	0	0
MyTravel Norway as	2,104	126	101	114
Aker Seafoods asa	2,093	152	122	1,167
Tollpost Globe as	2,090	77	52	0
Elektroskandia as	2,068	147	108	301
Celsa Armeringsstål as	2,057	111	85	336
Laerdal Medical as	2,023	176	146	1,060
Mestergruppen as	2,019	63	42	37
Steen & Strøm asa	2,010	1,762	1,084	252
Europris Holding asa	2,002	11	-56	0
M-I Swaco Norge as	1,996	203	137	0
Nammo as	1,990	269	185	1,193
EGL Nordic as	1,978	58	28	15
Rica Hotels AS	1,962	98	86	2,598
SINTEF	1,959	35	92	1,901
Farstad Shipping asa	1,940	700	543	1,270
Subsea 7 Norway nuf	1,929	164	151	0
Heimdal Gruppen as	1,919	349	336	330
Domstein asa	1,918	-23	-45	585
Scana Industrier asa	1,914	210	188	1,682
Coast Seafood as	1,905	40	31	23
Olav Thon Eiendomsselskap asa	1,888	1,985	1,398	0
DOF Subsea asa	1,888	550	419	875
Solstad Offshore asa	1,883	704	889	752
Nord-Trøndelag Elektrisitetsverk fkf	1,870	464	383	0
Rederiet Harald Sætre as	1,852	13	7	131
Fatland as	1,850	18	7	494
Eniro Holding as	1,839	536	246	788
ABG Sundal Collier asa	1,834	654	544	222
Nergård AS	1,831	324	276	0
Nordek as	1,818	24	18	22
Heidenreich Holding a/s	1,816	40	25	0
Acta Holding asa	1,813	918	671	391
Ulsmo as	1,794	31	230	558
I K Lykke as	1,763	1,672	76	934
Relacom as	1,751	-1	-22	1,895
Torghatten Trafikkselskap asa	1,710	147	96	125
Tide asa	1,702	44	21	0
Kitron asa	1,693	64	41	1,307
Dangaard Telecom Norway as	1,685	65	76	33
Trondheim Energi as	1,674	897	499	0
Automobil as	1,672	29	18	438
APL asa	1,671	157	116	0
Hustadmarmor as	1,670	322	188	159
General Motors Norge as	1,667	1	22	28
Sparebanken Norge	1,665	754	603	750
RWE Dea Norge as	1,663	640	-109	56
Rutebileiernes Standardiseringsaksjeselskap	1,659	303	218	140
Wilson asa	1,658	184	120	1,100
Hjemmet Mortensen as	1,657	241	163	818
Gyldendal asa	1,649	30	20	872
Motor Gruppen as	1,627	61	38	426
A Wilhelmsen as	1,621	2,039	2,708	0
BioMar a.s.	1,620	128	160	154
Felleskjøpet Rogaland Agder	1,620	22	14	364
Brødr. Sunde a/s	1,619	122	70	519
Volvo Maskin as	1,618	132	94	143
Gunnar Karlsen as	1,618	41	28	971
Norges Røde Kors	1,617	174	307	294
Jackon as	1,607	120	71	125
TTS Marine asa	1,604	896	60	459
Aker Material Handling	1,601	46	45	0
Menigo Foodservice Norge as	1,600	7	0	125
Sparebanken Midt-Norge	1,587	597	898	817
Skeidar Holding as	1,578	34	13	843
Jakob Hatteland Holding as	1,571	29	43	0
Coop Nord ba	1,567	58	42	603
Kaefer IKM as	1,559	87	66	262
Bonheur asa	1,558	311	838	0
Startour-Stjernereiser as	1,556	117	81	118
Nordic Intertrade as	1,547	49	25	118
IKM Gruppen as	1,535	204	174	822
Stor-Oslo Lokaltrafikk as	1,530	5	6	99
Lani Invest as	1,529	233	206	0
Block Watne Gruppen asa	1,529	240	162	606
Esso Energi as	1,523	26	18	28
Peab	1,505	6	-1	373
Scancem International ans	1,502	87	133	1,759
Bankenes Betalingssentral as	1,498	114	82	703
Ability Group asa	1,493	92	30	758
Johan G Olsen as	1,490	100	55	0
Byggma as	1,482	322	222	930
Deep Ocean asa	1,479	182	115	63
Grenland Group asa	1,473	-57	-46	900
Forbrukersamvirket Sør ba	1,469	47	49	766
KB Gruppen Kongsvinger as	1,467	125	116	495
Nycomed Pharma as	1,467	474	310	455
Kavli Holding as	1,439	-28	-24	0
Coop Orkla ba	1,427	28	24	638
Talisman Resources Norway Limited	1,422	794	3,875	0
Boliden Odda as	1,416	566	397	344
Coop Vestfold og Telemark ba	1,414	16	15	774
SG Finans as	1,413	226	319	0
Fosen Trafikklag asa	1,407	58	56	1,645
Pemco as	1,402	84	461	0
Skanem as	1,390	59	36	1,108
Ocean Rig asa	1,389	335	0	0
Hig Invest as	1,376	71	27	0
Norsea Group as	1,374	145	112	345
Glava as	1,370	138	100	392
Gaz de France Norge as	1,367	775	467	19
Heli-One (Norway) as	1,358	157	104	460
Johs Rasmussen as	1,356	88	70	1,311
Glamox asa	1,353	106	89	941
Monsun as	1,349	1,081	965	3
Euro Sko Norge as	1,348	57	38	192
Framo Engineering as	1,342	216	159	235
JL Tiedemanns Tobaksfabrik as	1,339	363	278	312
DNO asa	1,335	283	61	0
Fabricom as	1,330	29	22	620
H. I. Giørtz Sønner as	1,325	48	38	0
I M Skaugen asa	1,324	135	68	0
Sparebanken Møre	1,323	380	272	394
Ford Motor Norge as	1,321	28	30	0
Byggholt as	1,317	137	90	232
Torp Computing Group asa	1,312	32	21	102
Hilleik as	1,310	84	69	0
Norsk Aller as	1,293	47	107	0
Solar Norge as	1,281	72	48	302
Store Norske Spitsbergen Kulkompani as	1,266	-40	-77	287
Ernst & Young as	1,256	23	13	1,078
Salmar asa	1,248	511	445	0
as Fjellinjen	1,248	714	0	40
Norway Royal Salmon as	1,242	19	26	21
Selvaag Gruppen as	1,237	-101	135	0
Electrolux Home Products Norway as	1,237	9	19	0
Wenaasgruppen as	1,235	362	418	0
Norsk Helikopter as	1,226	68	24	171
Accenture ans	1,225	64	51	843
Pricewaterhouse as	1,218	316	2	824
Pon Equipment as	1,215	26	13	203
Energiselskapet Buskerud as	1,212	522	186	312
Norconsult Holding as	1,210	105	65	1,110
BMW Norge as	1,201	64	50	0
J. J. Ugland Holding as	1,190	455	326	698
Det Norske Diakonhjem	1,186	-9	3	0
Kjedehuset as	1,184	74	52	21
Coop Økonom ba	1,182	31	27	830
Coop Haugaland ba	1,181	49	40	560
Seaborn as	1,175	16	10	14
Kuoni Scandinavia ab nuf	1,174	7	10	69
CHC Helikopter Service as	1,173	-59	-45	397
as Avishuset Dagbladet	1,168	-32	14	0
GC Rieber as	1,168	151	96	0
Linstow as	1,167	698	972	40
DSV Road as	1,164	38	23	0
Shell International Pipelines Int nuf	1,163	874	204	0
SCA Hygiene Products as	1,161	148	111	233
Maske Gruppen as	1,154	0	4	0
Chess Communication as	1,150	95	65	140
A-K Holding Auctus as	1,147	6	-5	0
Marathon Petroleum Company Norway	1,142	346	438	0
Entra Eiendom as	1,136	618	170	134
Nortura Hærland as	1,135	59	27	0
Handicare as	1,132	96	50	175
HC Holding as	1,132	96	38	0
Fugro-Geoteam as	1,127	119	70	164
Chevron Norge as	1,121	594	89	12
Kronos Norge as	1,118	191	132	0
Bonnier Publications International as	1,111	113	89	0
Altinex asa	1,110	295	50	0
Flying Elephant as	1,099	167	26	0
Bergene Holm as	1,097	37	8	500
Infocare as	1,087	42	7	1,454
al Gartnerhallen	1,087	2	17	0
NCC Roads as	1,081	10	-7	404
Jordan as	1,079	93	52	808
HelgelandsKraft as	1,074	263	151	237
Lindex as	1,069	97	69	759
Bundegruppen as	1,068	57	51	205
Lefdal Elektromarked as	1,064	24	17	397
Nordli Gruppen as	1,060	29	13	550
Spenncon as	1,057	50	38	543
Assuranceforeningen Gard - gjensidig	1,057	-72	0	0
Spis Norge as	1,056	17	7	0
Legula as	1,054	57	32	0
Stavanger Fondsforvaltning as	1,054	559	409	91
KappAhl a/s	1,050	156	112	
E.ON Ruhrgas Norge as	1,047	520	87	14
Fast Search & Transfer asa	1,042	16	22	739
Aker Marine Contractors as	1,041	63	50	107
Mitsui & Co Norway as	1,038	40	20	12
Pfizer as	1,032	-24	-22	0
Sparebanken Hedmark	1,030	466	309	450
DFDS Lys Line as	1,026	14	17	106
Schenker as	1,026	56	42	260
Hansa Borg Bryggerier as	1,024	52	28	638
Brynild Gruppen as	1,023	0	0	0
KCA Deutag Drilling Norge as	1,021	-22	-10	892
Knutsen Shuttle Tankers Pool as	1,018	254	0	0
Clas Ohlson as	1,016	199	146	600
Jysk as	1,014	37	-10	0
Green Reefers asa	1,013	37	-10	0
First Securities	1,013	378	298	0
T S Eiendom as	1,006	125	94	0
Norconsult as	1,004	71	66	0
Coop Innlandet ba	1,002	15	9	563
Høiland Holding as	1,000	95	221	202
Tieto as	1,000	0	0	0
Diakonhjemmet Sykehus as	998	-19	-8	1,391
TDC Song as	995	-167	-218	200
AGA as	993	299	218	265
Lovisenberg Diakonale Sykehus as	992	16	12	1,150
as Ugland Rederi	990	457	363	0
Arcus-Gruppen as	984	84	40	465
Sulland Holding as	983	34	12	0
Fujitsu Siemens Computers as	976	-7	-2	39
Roxar as	968	68	37	585
Bautas as	966	209	145	550
Draka Norsk Kabel as	962	45	30	234
Technor Holding as	962	30	179	604
Coop Sambo ba	961	43	28	600
Maxit as	961	145	101	302
Stiftelsen Handelshøyskolen BI	959	53	36	716
Felleskjøpet Maskin ba	957	6	2	96
Treschow-Fritzøe as	954	6	76	100
Ruukki Profiler as	953	99	71	248
Falconbridge Nikkelverk as	952	114	78	466
Bergens Tidende as	947	113	88	523
Terra Gruppen as	944	199	134	75
Get as	942	183	136	0
Strømberg Gruppen as	940	50	24	272
as Sigurd Hesselberg	930	30	22	151
Volvo Aero Norge as	927	172	122	495
Aspelin-Ramm Gruppen as	926	268	201	242
Protan as	925	35	21	684
Fredrikstad Energi as	920	97	8	16
Frelsesarmeen	913	50	59	0
Brødrene Risa as	913	87	58	0
Rasmussengruppen as	912	757	1,208	0
Nydalen Bolig as	911	195	134	0
Bunker Oil as	911	11	5	18
D&F Group as	909	67	47	878
Assuranceforeningen Skuld (Gjensidig)	908	139	0	145
Jøtul Holding as	905	79	35	513
MAN Last og Buss as	899	14	9	223
Adresseavisen asa	898	14	9	223
Utkilen as	896	47	33	293
Knut Axel Ugland Holding as	893	70	40	7
Nordlaks Holding as	890	223	151	0
Fjordlaks as	886	87	43	0
Istad as	885	91	32	404
Gunnar Nordbø as	880	29	27	110
Bourbon Offshore Norway as	879	337	166	0
Brødrene Nordbø as	879	29	25	1
Odim asa	878	106	106	280
Anthon B Nilsen as	878	52	19	0
Tandberg Data asa	877	-50	-75	203
Unicon as	876	57	43	163
Scandinavian Fittings and Flanges as	870	106	86	0
Nordic Paper as	869	-44	-40	398
Fortum Markets as	866	8	1	23
Egil Stenshagen Holding as	865	65	74	175
Norges Handels og Sjøfartstidende as	860	65	45	457
Eidesvik Offshore asa	855	278	296	520
Denofa as	855	21	12	56
Oceaneering as	851	164	115	0
Hospitality Invest as	846	6	202	0
Folke Hermansen as	846	683	506	469
Kid Interiør as	844	113	78	0
Viking Supply Ships as	844	322	223	0
Fagforbundet	844	19	37	0
TrønderEnergi as	844	320	183	290
Boligbygg Oslo kf	843	320	132	21
West Contractors as	840	25	20	27
GlaxoSmithKline as	838	74	49	150
Akershus Energi as	838	608	355	24
Bjørge asa	838	41	24	6
Welcon as	837	147	106	0
Blom asa	835	100	62	0
NLI Holding as	833	15	1	0
Santander Consumer Bank as	830	448	282	216
Kuehne + Nagel as	827	11	8	100
Periscopus	822	117	82	0
Norwegian Hull Club - Gjensidig Assuranseforening	821	-85	39	78
Europark as	819	47	35	250
Synnøve Finden asa	817	-141	-94	372
Fjordland as	815	24	18	
Trico Supply as	813	411	384	70
Petrojack	810	772	566	0
Leonhard Nilsen & Sønner - Eiendom as	808	100	75	480
Scombrus as	799	-3	-16	0
BA Holding as	799	0	0	173
Norsildmel Innovation as	799	40	22	0
Wurth Norge as	798	103	79	414
Multiconsult as	798	64	48	908
Norsea Gas as	792	524	160	0
Coop Helgeland ba	792	18	13	450
Norskott Havbruk as	790	205	126	0
Eikmaskin as	790	52	30	23
Carnegie asa	784	367	274	0
Neumann Bygg as	783	28	14	63
Capgemini Norge as	781	46	101	0
Schneider Electric Norge as	774	28	20	155
