= Ramform Titan =

Marine seismic acquisition vessel

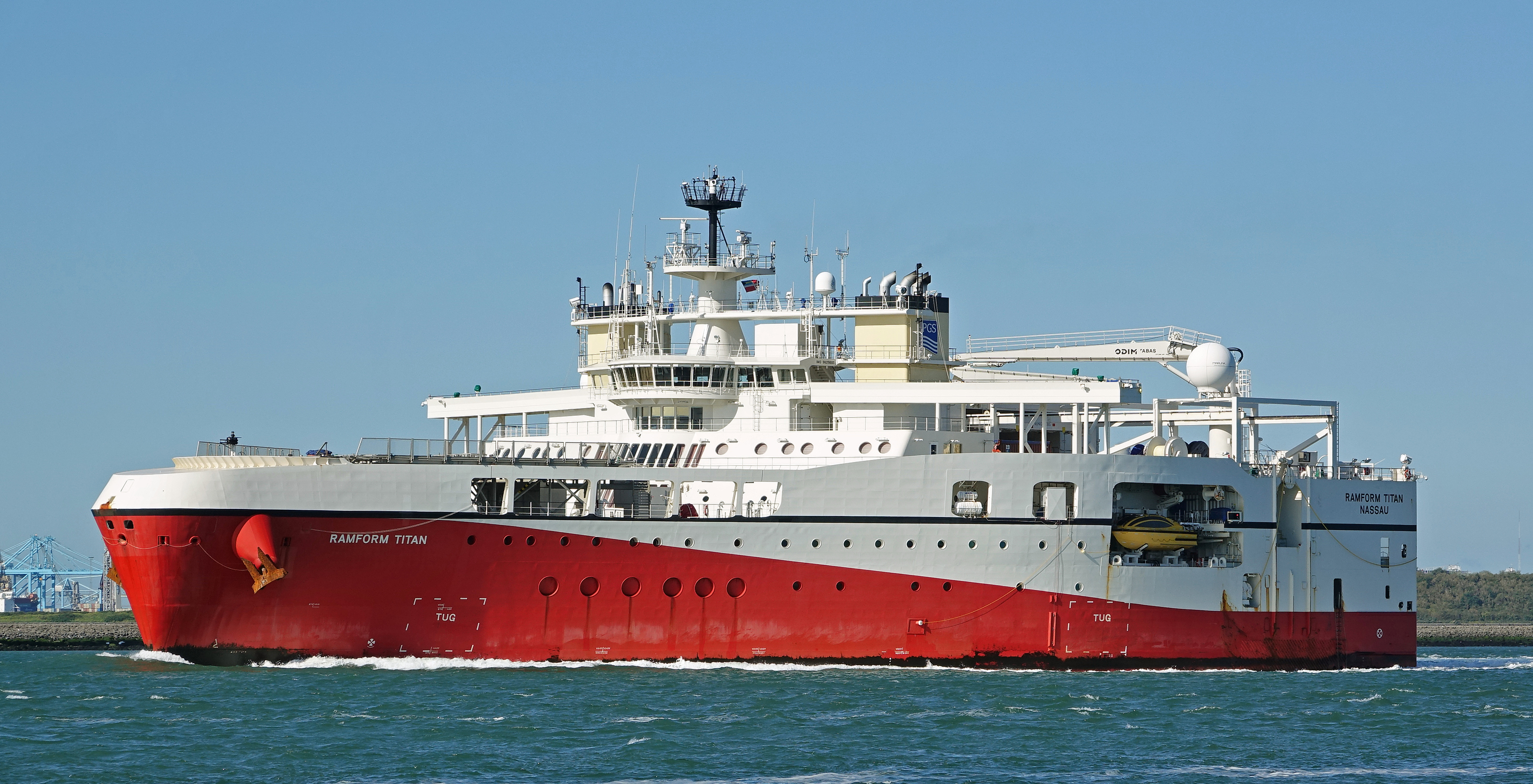
- Ramform Titan in 2020

History
- Name: Ramform Titan
- Owner: TGS
- Builder: MHI, Nagasaki, Japan
- Launched: 2013

General characteristics
- Length: 104.2 m (341 ft 10 in)
- Beam: 70 m (229 ft 8 in)
- Installed power: 3 x 6,000 kw each
- Speed: 16 knots (30 km/h; 18 mph)
- Crew: 80

Stern view. Sixteen streamer reels for hundreds of thousands of acoustic sensors.

Ramform Titan is a marine seismic acquisition vessel built in 2013 by the MHI shipyard in Nagasaki, Japan. Its width at the stern is 70 m (230 ft), making it the widest class of single-hulled ships in the world (NN Nanny previously exceeded this with a beam of 79 m before being broken up in 2003).

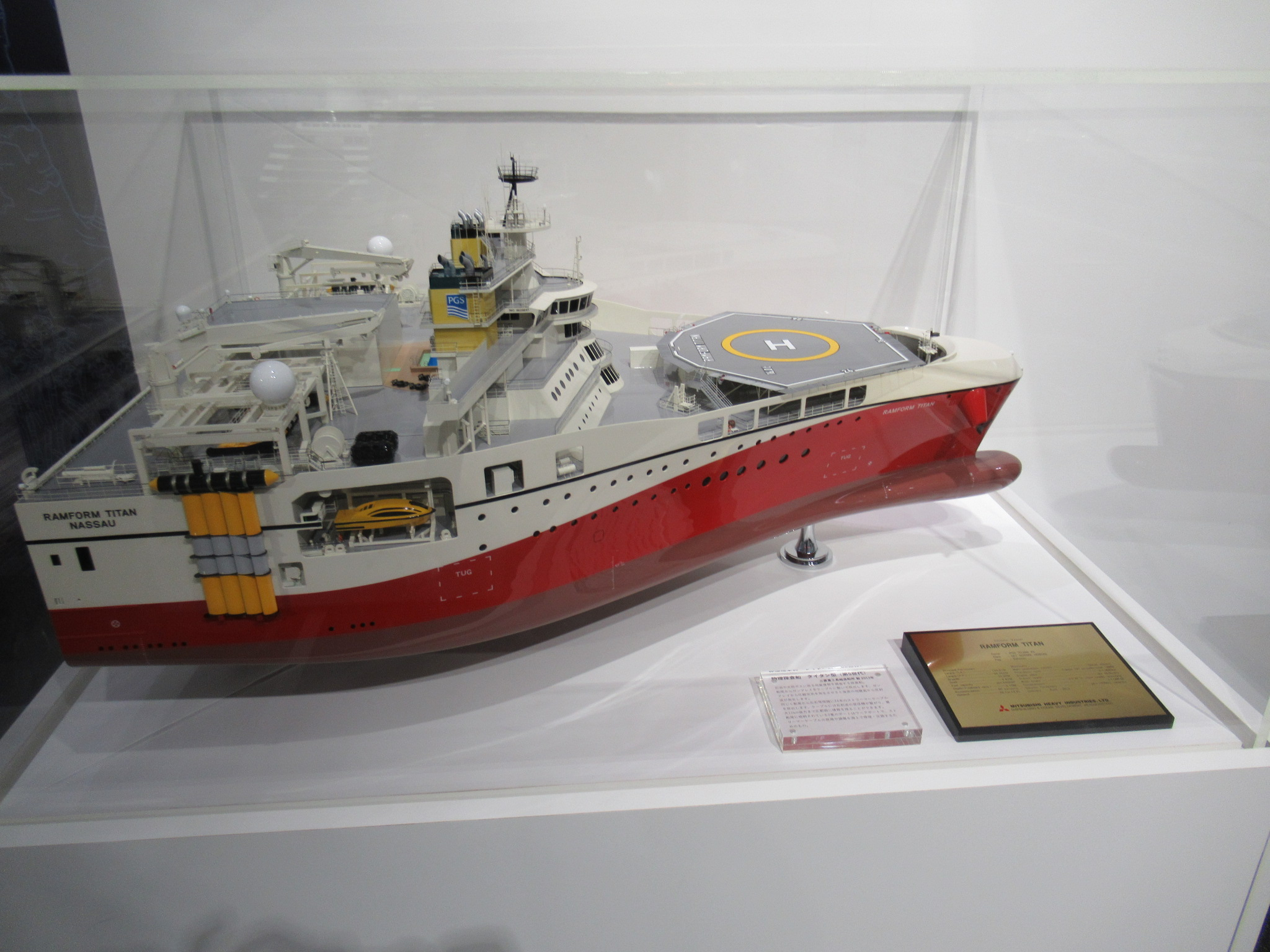
A model of the Ramform Titan

The Ramform class of ships was developed by PGS, before the company merged with TGS in 2024. PGS built three other Titan-class vessels after Ramform Titan: Ramform Atlas, Ramform Hyperion, and Ramform Tethys.
