= Ellen Ugland =

Norwegian billionaire (1953–2010)

Ellen Ugland (19 May 1953 in Grimstad – 6 December 2010 in Bærum) was a Norwegian billionaire

She was the widow of billionaire Johan Jørgen Ugland (1921-2010) who she had married on 15 May 1989. Her husband died on 28 March 2010. She was found dead in her apartment in Lysaker in Bærum Municipality on 6 December 2010. Shortly after her body was found the police announced the death to be suspicious.

== See also ==
- J. J. Ugland
