= Rolv =

Rolv is a given name. Notable people with the given name include:

- Rolv Petter Amdam (born 1953), Norwegian economic historian
- Rolv Enge (1921–2014), Norwegian resistance member and architect
- Rolv Werner Erichsen (1899–1988), Norwegian newspaper editor
- Rolv Hellesylt (1927–2024), Norwegian judge
- Rolv Henden (1914–1992), Norwegian businessperson and resistance member
- Rolv Høiland (1926–2001), Norwegian magazine editor
- Rolv Ryssdal (1914–1998), Norwegian judge
- Rolv Thesen (1896–1966), Norwegian poet, literary researcher and literary critic
- Rolv Yttrehus (1926–2018), American composer
- Rolv Wesenlund (1936–2013), Norwegian comedian, singer, clarinetist, writer and actor

== See also ==
- Rolf
