= Sandvika Storsenter =

Building in Bærum, Akershus, Norway

Coordinates: 59°53′24″N 10°31′13″E

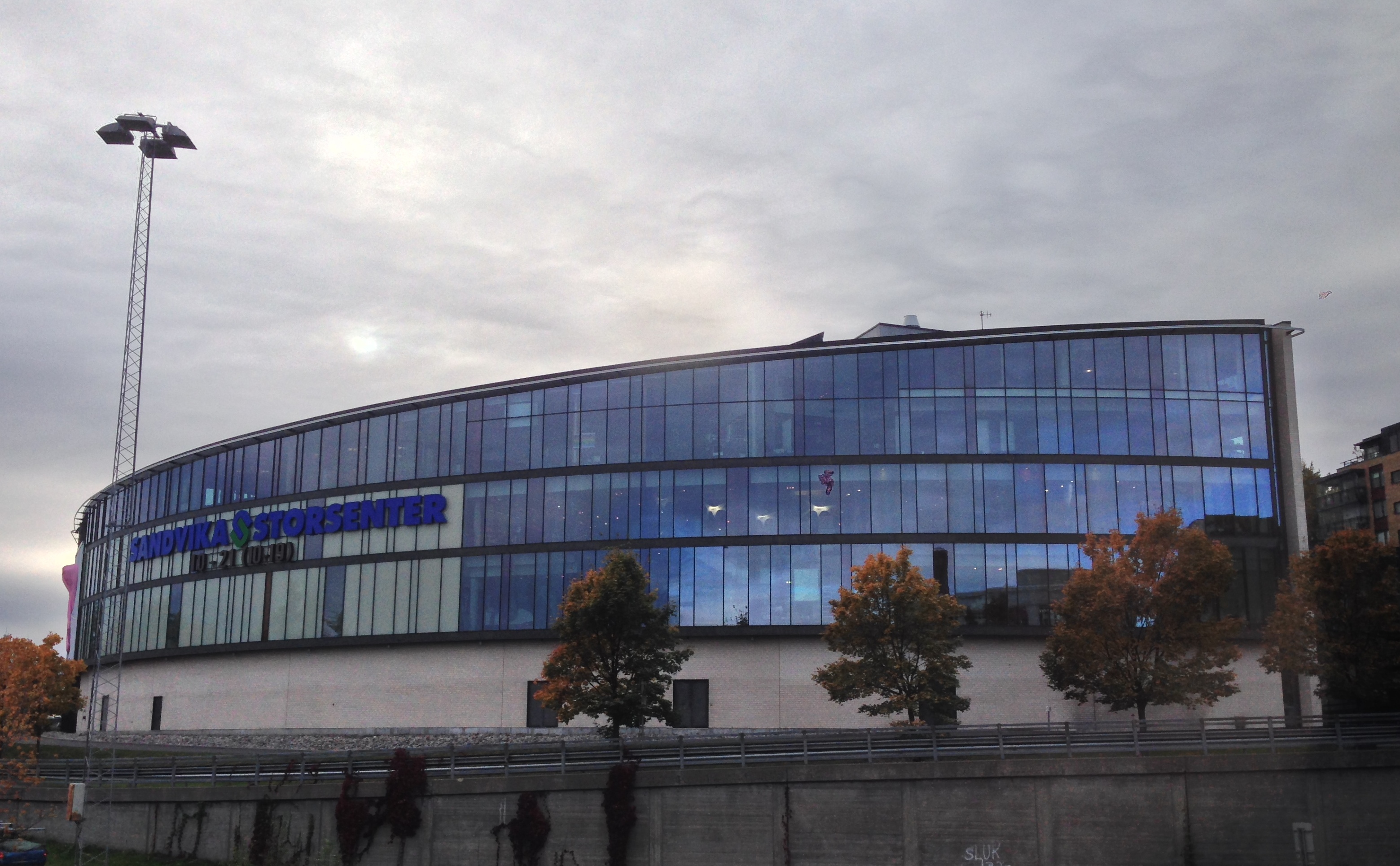
Sandvika Storsenter

Sandvika Storsenter is a super-regional mall located in Sandvika outside of Oslo, Norway. It is owned by the Olav Thon Group (Olav Thon Gruppen) which in turn is owned by the Olav Thon Foundation (Olav Thon Stiftelsen).

The mall opened October 14, 1993, and was then 24,000 square metres. It was expanded in 1997, making it the largest shopping mall in Norway at the time. Today, after one main extension in 2007, the mall is 60,000 square metres. For a good while it had 190 stores; today that number has increased to 197.

Sandvika Storsenter is visited by an average of more than 25,000 customers every day, 150,000 per week and 8 million a year. The highest registered turnover and visitors for a single day, December 21, 2009, was NOK 33.95 million and 57,859 visitors. That same year, week 51 had a turnover of NOK 190.9 million and 306,000 visitors. The mall's revenue in 2013 was NOK 3.18 billion.

As of 2011, some of the largest and most prominent stores included Ultra, Hennes & Mauritz, Clas Ohlson, Elixia, Lefdal, XXL, Norli, Bolia and Barnas Hus.
