= Helgo =

Helgo, Helgø or Helgö may refer to:

== People ==
- Helgo Zettervall (1831–1907), Swedish architect and professor
- Christine Sagen Helgø (born 1968), Norwegian politician, mayor of Stavanger
- Malene Helgø (born 1999), Norwegian tennis player

== Other uses ==
- Helgo, alternate spelling of Halga, a legendary Danish king
- Helgö, an island in Ekerö Municipality, Stockholm County, Sweden
- Helgø, full name Helgø Matsenter, a Norwegian supermarket chain

== See also ==
- Helge (disambiguation)
