= Alfa Sko =

Norwegian footwear brand and former factory

- Formerly: Alfa Skofabrikk
- Company type: Aksjeselskap
- Industry: Footwear
- Founded: 1932
- Headquarters: Brandbu, Hadeland, Norway
- Key people: Maurice Christensen; Einar Stuhaug; Jacob Ihlen
- Products: Hunting and mountain boots, military boots, work and safety shoes
- Number of employees: 22 (2026)

Alfa is a Norwegian footwear brand and a former Norwegian shoe factory. The factory at first specialized in finer women's and children's shoes, while today Alfa is primarily hunting and mountain boots, military boots, and work and safety shoes.

The factory started in Oslo but moved to Brandbu on Hadeland in 1956, where it was in production until 2007, after which Alfa has been a brand and sales company with production abroad.

== History ==
=== The factory in Oslo ===
Alfa Skofabrikk was started as a joint-stock company in 1932 with Maurice Christensen as principal owner. Toward the end of the 1930s the factory had a production of 1,200 to 1,500 pairs of women's and children's shoes a week, and the firm's goods were sold all over the country. The firm also owned Bambi Skofabrikk at Brandbu and had the subsidiary A/S Omega for the manufacture of clogs.

In 1956 Einar Stuhaug became sole owner, having been a co-owner and sales manager at Alfa since 1932. He invested fully in the Brandbu factory, and Alfa in Oslo was closed; at that point there were over 700 employees in the shoe factories.

=== Alfa shoe factory, Brandbu ===
Alfa Skofabrikk first established itself at Brandbu with the children's-shoe factory Bambi in 1953, and then moved the Oslo production to Brandbu in 1956. Responsible for the move to Brandbu and the merging of the Bambi factory there with the whole factory from Oslo was Jacob Ihlen (1927–2010). He had wide-ranging experience in the shoe trade and a year of study in the United States with support from the Marshall aid. Ihlen remained Alfa's daily manager until he retired in 1992, and is given much of the credit for Alfa surviving for many decades through a turbulent time for the Norwegian shoe industry. Besides being factory manager, he was also chiefly responsible for the design of the shoe models, for which the factory won design prizes several times during the 1960s.

The move was justified by expectations that it would be difficult to obtain labor in Oslo, where wage levels were also higher than in the districts. Only later did state industrial policy come in as a justification for moving to the districts and investing in expansion there, but the Regional Development Fund (DU, later SND) eventually became an important source of financing for the Brandbu factory too, including in expansions and rebuilding after a destructive fire in 1976.

=== Shoes for soldiers, skiers, and workers ===
Alfa Skofabrikk became a well-known supplier of footwear and stayed in the trade longer than many of the country's other shoe factories thanks to special products aimed particularly at the armed forces. Very large state purchases were directed toward Norwegian industry, and the armed forces' need for field boots remained steadily high as long as Norwegian soldiers wore out shoes. After a break in Alfa's defense deliveries from about 2010, the company entered a new four-year contract for field boots in 2022. Besides military field boots, ski boots also became a large product, and the focus eventually turned toward work and leisure shoes, while everyday shoes for children and adults, dress shoes, and bunad shoes were phased out.

=== Production abroad ===
Shoe production was decided to be closed in 2006, partly after a decline in the secure production of field boots for the armed forces, which had been the factory's main activity in its last years. Production at Brandbu was finally closed in September 2007, and of 65 employees about half were able to continue in the sales and marketing part of Alfa, which carried on with production abroad. In 2009 the Alfa building was sold to the company Hadelandprodukter.

As soon as the risky and unprofitable production part was closed, Alfa's expertise and position in the shoe market became an attractive investment, and the Møller group invested heavily in Alfa through its investment company Katalysator. Alfa was developed further with, among other things, development projects for special footwear for working life and shoes for hunting and outdoor life.
