= Høiland =

Høiland is a Norwegian surname. Notable people with the surname include:

- Jan Høiland (1939–2017), Norwegian singer
- Jon Inge Høiland (born 1977), Norwegian footballer
- Ole Høiland (1797–1848), Norwegian burglar
- Rolv Høiland (1926–2001), Norwegian magazine editor
- Tommy Høiland (born 1989), Norwegian footballer
