= Gartnerhallen =

Norwegian agricultural cooperative

Garternhallen
- Type: Cooperative
- Industry: Food processing
- Founded: 1930
- Headquarters: Oslo, Norway
- Area served: Norway
- Products: Vegetables; Potatoes; Berries; Fruit
- Revenue: NOK 2400 million (2017)
- Number of employees: 23 (2025)
- Website: www.gartnerhallen.no

Gartnerhallen (Norwegian: [ˈɡɑʈnərhɑlən]) is a Norwegian agricultural cooperative that operates processing plants related to vegetables, fruit, potatoes and berries. It is owned by 1,400 gardeners and potato farmers. The cooperative was started in 1930 and in 1997 is went over to a pure interest group with focus on manufacturing, product development and innovation. Major customers include Norgesgruppen and Bama Gruppen who the cooperative has long-term contracts with.
