= Øystese =

Village in Kvam Municipality, Norway

- Village
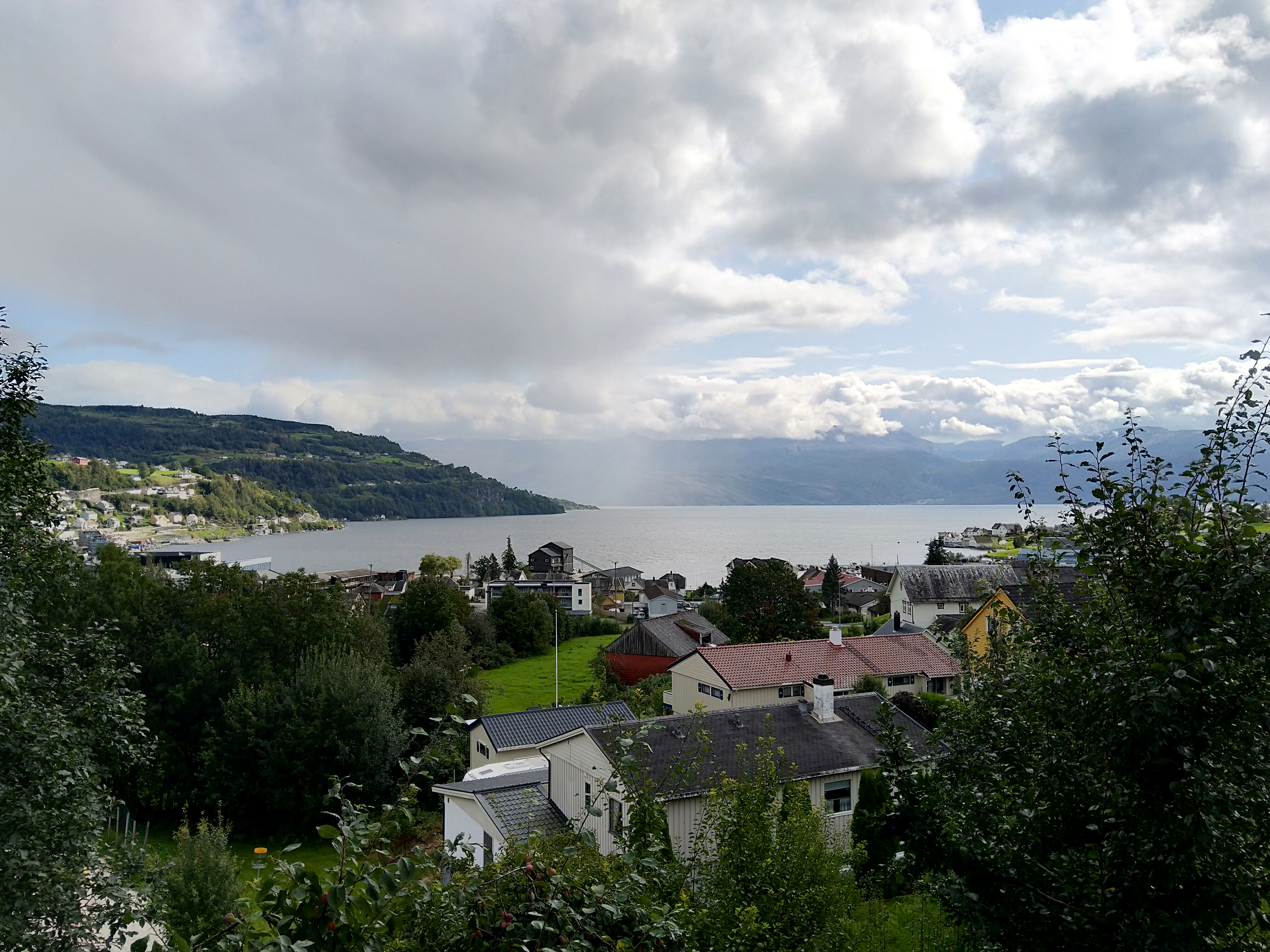
- View of the village
- Interactive map of Øystese
- Coordinates: 60.38668°N 6.20074°E
- Country: Norway
- Region: Western Norway
- County: Vestland
- District: Hardanger
- Municipality: Kvam Municipality

Area
  - Total: 1.87 km^{2} (0.72 sq mi)
- Elevation: 4 m (13 ft)

Population (2025)
  - Total: 2,259
  - Density: 1,208/km^{2} (3,130/sq mi)
- Time zone: UTC+01:00 (CET)
  - Summer (DST): UTC+02:00 (CEST)
- Post Code: 5610 Øystese

Øystese is a village in Kvam Municipality in Vestland county, Norway. It is located along the Hardangerfjord about 7 kilometres (4.3 mi) east of the municipal centre of Norheimsund. Norwegian County Road 7 passes through the village.

The 1.87-square-kilometre (460-acre) village has a population (2025) of 2,259 and a population density of 1,208 inhabitants per square kilometre (3,130/sq mi). The Øystese Church from 1868 is located in the village center. There is also a primary school and a secondary school located in Øystese.

== Economy ==
The village is an industrial centre for the municipality. It is a leading producer of lumber and there are also several furniture factories. The furniture design and manufacturing company Arthur Soltvedt Møbelfabrikk, also known as Pega Furniture, was first founded in Øystese in 1942. There is a dairy and cheese factory in Øystese. The factory used to produce gammalost cheese until 1990 when the production of that particular kind of cheese was moved to a different factory in Vikøyri.

== See also ==
- Arthur Soltvedt Møbelfabrikk, a furniture company first founded in Øystese during World War II
- Kvam Municipality#Notable people
