= Øystese Church =

Church in Vestland, Norway

- Øystese kyrkje
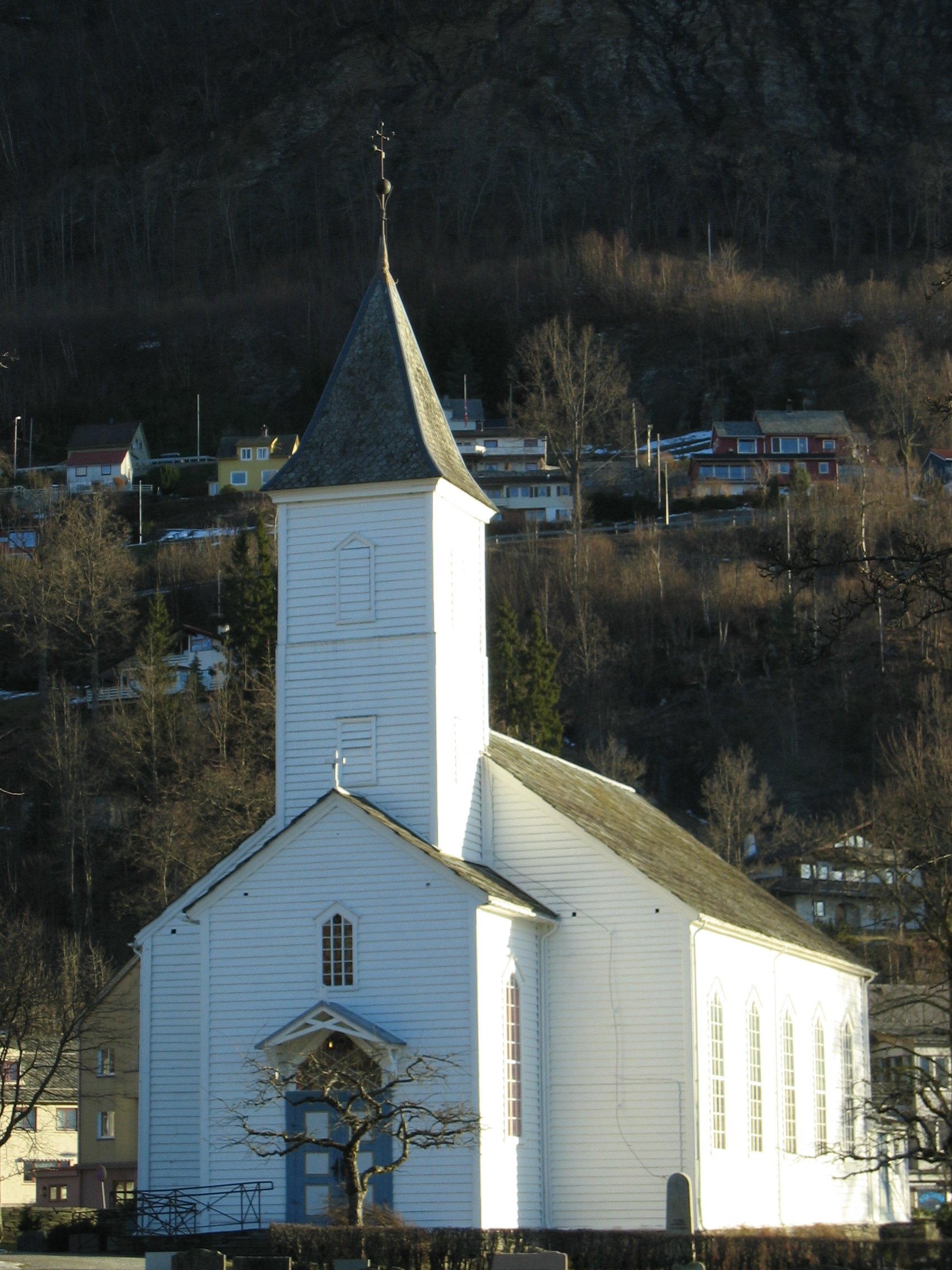
- View of the church
- Øystese Church
- 60°23′16″N 6°12′12″E
- Location: Kvam Municipality, Vestland
- Country: Norway
- Denomination: Church of Norway
- Previous denomination: Catholic Church
- Churchmanship: Evangelical Lutheran

History
- Status: Parish church
- Founded: 13th century
- Consecrated: 1868

Architecture
- Functional status: Active
- Architect: C. Erichsen
- Architectural type: Long church
- Completed: 1868 (158 years ago)

Specifications
- Capacity: 500
- Materials: Wood

Administration
- Diocese: Bjørgvin bispedømme
- Deanery: Hardanger og Voss prosti
- Parish: Øystese
- Norwegian Cultural Heritage Site
- Type: Church
- Status: Listed
- ID: 85946

Øystese Church (Norwegian: Øystese kyrkje) is a parish church of the Church of Norway in Kvam Municipality in Vestland county, Norway. It is located in the village of Øystese. It is the church for the Øystese parish which is part of the Hardanger og Voss prosti (deanery) in the Diocese of Bjørgvin. The white, wooden church was built in a long church design in 1868 using plans drawn up by the architect C. Erichsen in consultation with Jacob Wilhelm Nordan. The church seats about 500 people.

== History ==
The earliest existing historical records of the church date back to the year 1300, and it was relatively new at that time. The first church here was a wooden stave church with an open corridor encircling the building. This church was probably built in the late 13th century. It was located about 400 metres (0.25 mi) to the northwest of the present site of the church. The church nave measured about 13.2 by 10 metres (43 ft × 33 ft) and the choir measured about 5.6 by 6.3 metres (18 ft × 21 ft). There was also a 5.3-by-5.3-metre (17 ft × 17 ft) church porch with a bell tower above it. Over the years, the church had a number of renovations. Most of the corridors around the church had been removed by 1845. In 1845, the church underwent significant repairs, including removing the last portion of the remaining corridors that once encircled the church.

Even after the repairs of the church, the centuries-old building was still in poor condition. The parish received permission to build a new church. It was decided to build the new church closer to the shoreline of the fjord, about 400 metres (0.25 mi) to the southeast of the old church site. The architect C. Erichsen designed the church and the national church architect Jacob Wilhelm Nordan made some changes to the plan before construction. Askjel Aase was hired as the lead builder. In 1868, the new church was built on the new site. The new building was consecrated on 15 May 1868. After the new church was completed, the old church was torn down. During the demolition, the workers found a coin and other items dating to the early 1300s beneath the foundation, which help to date the construction of the church.

== Media gallery ==
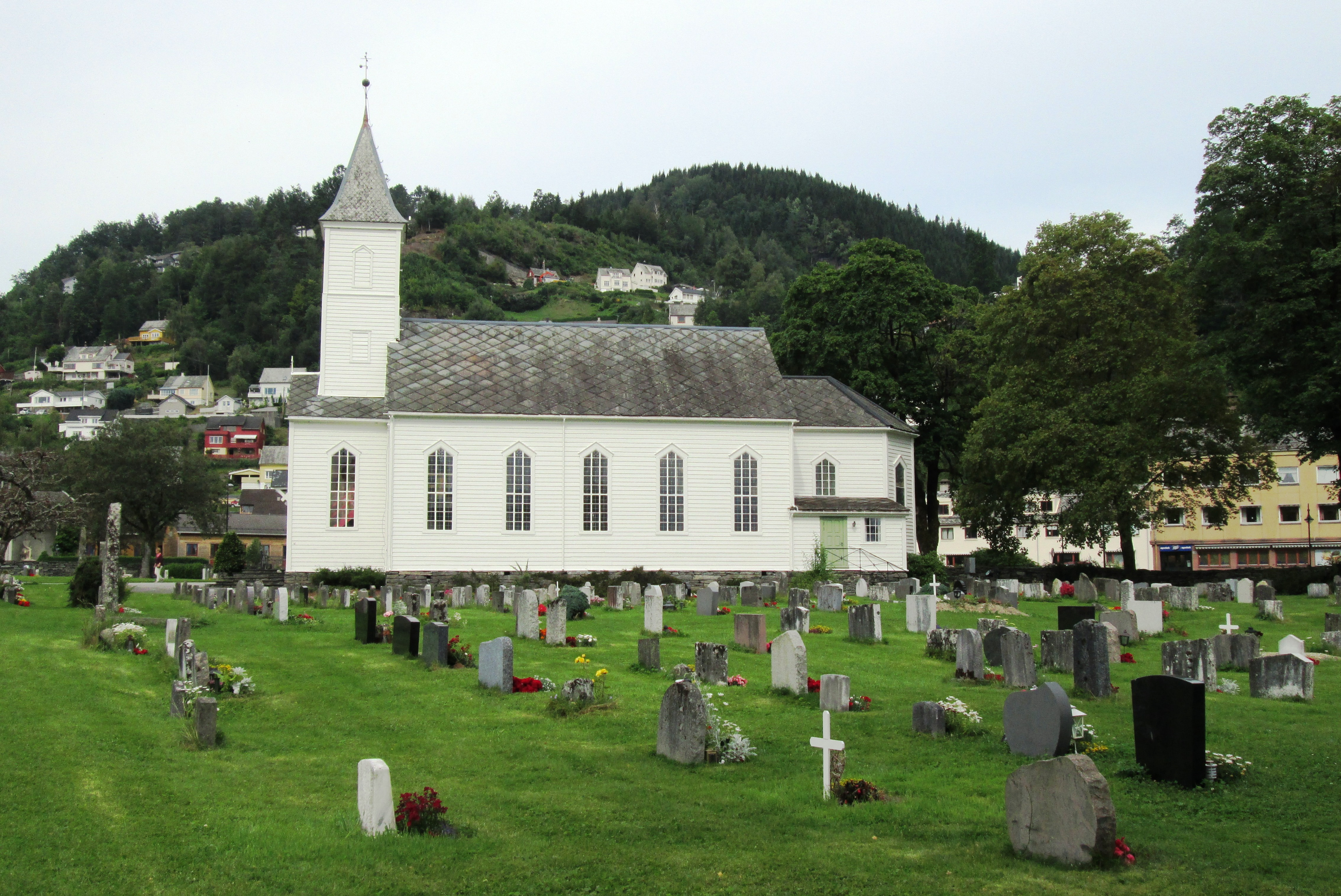

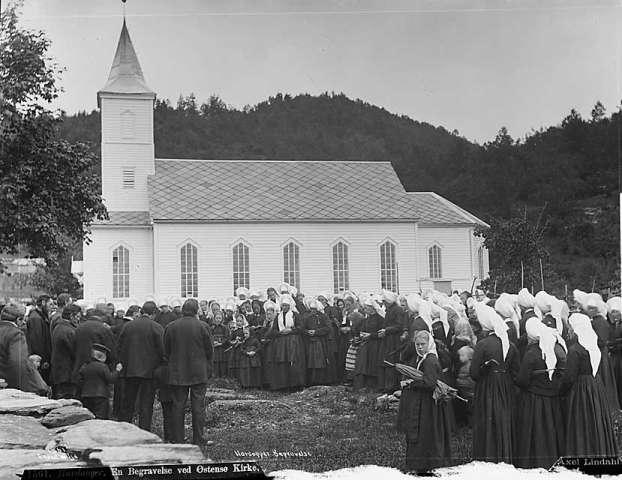

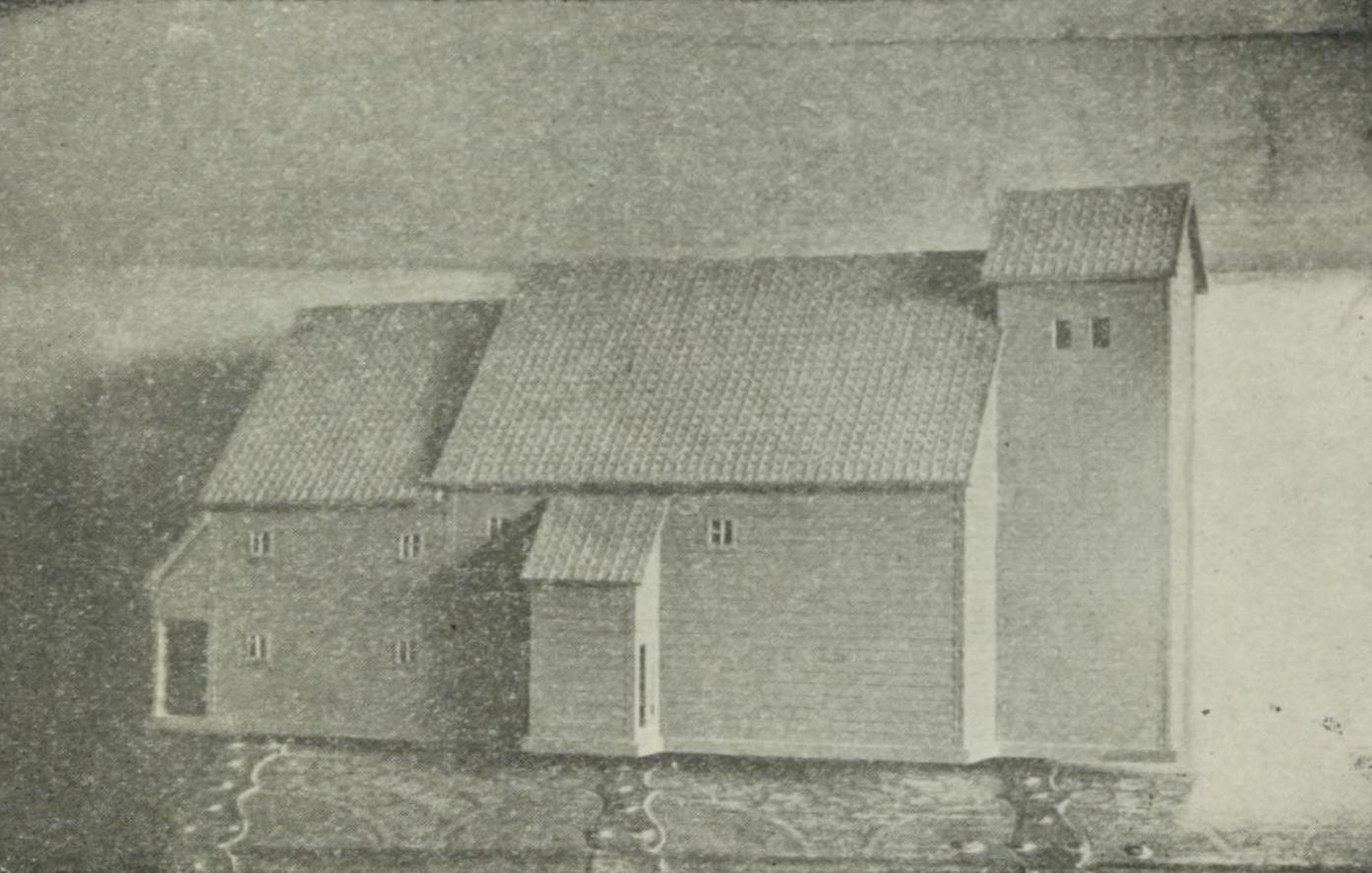
Model of the old church before 1868

== See also ==
- List of churches in Bjørgvin
