= Scandinavian Bunkering =

Scandinavian Bunkering AS
- Type: Private
- Industry: Petroleum
- Founded: 1993
- Defunct: 26 September 2016
- Fate: Merged with Glander International Bunkering
- Headquarters: Tønsberg, Norway
- Area served: Global
- Key people: Kennet Bollerød (CEO); Jon Kåre Brekke (Chairman)
- Products: Bunker oil Lubricant
- Operating income: NOK 40 million (2006)
- Net income: NOK 20 million (2006)
- Owner: Bunker Holding A/S (DK)
- Number of employees: 15 (2007)

Scandinavian Bunkering was a global provider of bunker oil and lubricant for the shipping industry. Founded in 1993, main offices are located in Tønsberg, Norway, though the company also has offices in Singapore and Montevideo. In 1997 Scandinavian Bunkering bought Sea Bunker, founded in 1981. On 26 September 2016, Scandinavian Bunkering merged with Glander International Bunkering.

In 2005 Scandinavian Bunkering was in a court battle with the Australian Fisheries Management Authority over an estimated A$300,000 worth of bunker oil in the arrested Spanish ship MV Taruman. In 2006 Scandinavian Bunkers was the 72nd largest company in Norway with revenue at NOK 6,243 million.
