= AF Group =

Norwegian civil engineering and construction company

AF Gruppen ASA
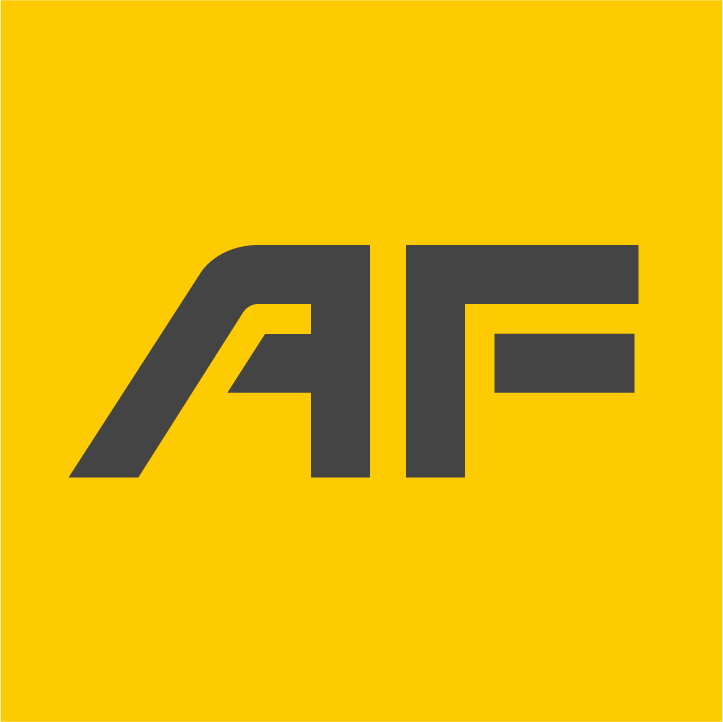
- Type: Allmennaksjeselskap
- Traded as: OSE: AFG
- Industry: Construction
- Founded: 1985
- Headquarters: Oslo, Norway
- Area served: Scandinavia
- Key people: Amund Tøftum (CEO); Morten Grongstad (Chairman)
- Revenue: ▲NOK 31 billion (2025)
- Operating income: NOK 1 662 million (2025)
- Net income: 1,653,000,000 Norwegian krone (2025)
- Number of employees: 5805
- Website: afgruppen.no

The AF Group ASA (OSE: AFG) (Norwegian: AF Gruppen) is the third largest civil engineering and construction company in Norway. The company headquarters is located in Oslo. The AF Group is listed on the Oslo Stock Exchange.

== History ==
The AF Group was established by Per Ove Aftreth and Leif Jørgen Moger as Arbeidsfellesskapet (AF) in 1985. The company eventually went into the oil and gas sector and built the landfall tunnel from the Troll Field in 1991, among other projects. AF merged with Ragnar Evensen in 1997, one of Oslo's largest contractors, which doubled AF's revenues. The acquisition of real estate-company Odin in 1997 was the basis for the business area Property, and AF built up the business areas demolition and recycling in the years that followed. The company took on the demolition of Sola Refinery in Jæren in 2000, one of the largest demolition projects in Norway. AF eventually became one of Norway's biggest within demolition.

Today, the company is one of the largest providers of energy efficiency and renewable energy production. In 2013, Offshore was established as a separate business area, after several projects in the years before. The Offshore commitment was extended with maintenance and modification, as well as marine and rig services, and new contracts in the North Sea resulted in Environmental Base at Vats, a modern reception facility for decommissioned offshore installations.

=== Former subsidiaries ===
==== Norway ====
- AF Gruppen Industri AS
- AF Ragnar Evensen AS
- AF Spesialistprosjekt AS
- AF Brødrene Holstad
- Rolvsrud Utbygging AS
- SRG - Scandinavian Rock Group AS

==== Sweden ====
- AF Anläggning AB
- JK Bygg i Göteborg AB

== Business areas ==
=== Property ===
The real estate division is responsible for developing the housing business and manages a number of properties in Eastern Norway and Western Sweden.

=== Building ===
The building division of AF supplies new constructions, including residential buildings, office buildings, schools and cultural and institutional buildings.

=== Civil Engineering ===
Civil engineering is the largest division in the AF Group. It is divided into three business units: AF Civil Engineering, AF Harbour, AF Oil & Energy and has projects all over Norway, and western Sweden.

=== Environment ===
The environment division works with demolition and upgrading of older structures, including offshore installations for which it has built a top-modern decommissioning yard at Vats, near Haugesund. The division has offices in Norway, the United Kingdom and Poland.

=== Energy ===
The energy division works with designing, improving and optimizing energy solutions in buildings, constructions and ships and offshore installations. It has offices in Norway and China.

== Management ==
- Amund Tøftum - CEO/ President
- Sverre Hærem - CFO/ Executive Vice President
- Arild Moe - Executive Vice President Civil Engineering
- Henning Olsen - Executive Vice President Building
- Lars Myhre Hjelmeset - Executive Vice President Offshore
- Andreas Jul Røsjø - Executive Vice President Property and Energy
- Eirik Wraal - Executive Vice President Environment
- Bård Frydenlund - Executive Vice President Human Resources

== Honors and rewards ==
- AF's website was named winner of the Farmandpris in 2009 in the category for best website among listed Norwegian companies.
- The AF Group won the Farmandpris in 2015 for best annual report in the category of listed companies.
- AF and Peer Gynt AS won the Culture and Business award in 2009 in the category culture based business. Forum for Culture and Business, in cooperation with Innovation Norway, hands out awards to honor and encourage cultural and business cooperation.
- The AF Group won Construction of the year in 2007 with the project Blåfalli Vik.
