= Skanem =

Norwegian label and packaging manufacturer

- Formerly: Stavanger Blikemballagefabrik; Noblikk–Sannem
- Type: Aksjeselskap
- Industry: Packaging, self-adhesive labels
- Founded: 1896
- Headquarters: Stavanger, Norway
- Key people: Ole Rugland
- Products: Self-adhesive labels (formerly tinplate packaging)

Skanem is a producer of self-adhesive labels with production in many countries and head office in Stavanger. The company has its origins in the canning industry in Stavanger and took over the leading packaging factory Noblikk–Sannem in Moss and Bergen in 1991. Production of tin cans and other packaging was closed in 2016.

== History ==
The history of the packaging company Skanem in Stavanger involves several businesses in Bergen, Sandvika, Stavanger, and Moss. The starting point was tin cans used as packaging for everything from paint and chemicals to food, biscuits, and sweets. The first of these businesses was started in Bergen by Julius Anton Sannem (1844–1922), and Sandvika's great entrepreneur Caspar Brambani (1834–1906) started the next in 1888. Stavanger Blikemballagefabrik from 1896 and Stavanger Bliktrykkeri from 1905 met the needs of the canning town, from 1973 under the name Skanem. Last came the Bergen man Inggard Sundt, who made his name as a landowner and milk manufacturer near Moss and started up in Moss during the speculative optimism of 1917.

=== The eastern Norway story ===
Inggard Sundt (1881–1940) belonged to one of Bergen's richest families. In 1906 he bought a large former monastic estate near Moss, Værne Kloster, and from then on styled himself the landowner Sundt. With an agricultural education from Sweden, he wanted to invest in modern meat and milk production, and he modernized the estate by building one of the country's largest cowsheds, with room for 130 animals.

To find an outlet for the enormous milk production, he built several factories for condensed milk. Under the Jøkel trademark he aimed to compete against the dominant Viking Melk from Nestlé's Norwegian factories. The first factory got going in Levanger, and by 1920 the landowner had large factories in Moss, in Ystad and Kalmar in Sweden, and in Fredericia and Nykøbing in Denmark. The venture was financed with nearly 10 million kroner in share capital, mainly invested by the Sundt family and the Knudsen family of Arendal and Porsgrunn, to which his wife Alfhild belonged. The effort failed in the turbulent postwar economy and in far too tough competition against Nestlé, and the milk factories were sold or closed, but one part of the venture lived on: the tin-can factory in Moss.

=== Østlandske Blikemballagefabrik ===
Østlandske Blikemballagefabrik was started by Sundt in 1916 to supply the milk factories with packaging. Although Værne Kloster's milk factories disappeared as a customer, it proved possible to sell tin packaging to other industry: the country's many canning factories demanded it in great quantity, biscuit factories needed boxes with lids, and chemical factories, particularly the makers of paint and varnish, also had large needs.

The problem was that the speculative boom had led to overestablishment of tinware factories too, and through the 1920s the difficulties became plain in fierce price competition in which the firms ruined one another. The most solid took the initiative to cooperate. A national merger was first discussed, but at this stage the western Norway firms chose to stay out while the eastern ones gathered in Moss.

=== Forenede Blikemballagefabriker ===
It was Sundt in Moss who held the largest and most modern factory plant, and also the best location relative to the markets on both sides of the Oslofjord, nearest harbor and railway. Sandvikens Blikvarefabrik in Bærum, started in 1888 by Caspar Donato Brambani (1834–1906), held the longest industry experience but also the oldest factory, and Brambani Jr. saw the advantage of gathering in Moss, as the Sandvika plant could easily find other uses.

They were joined by Christiania/Oslo Blikemballagefabrik, also a boom-time venture from the end of the First World War, and the three companies came together in the new company Forenede Blikemballagefabriker in 1929, called Foblik for short. Sundt's factory manager from the start, in both the milk factory and the tinware factory, Henry Becker-Erichsen (1890–1973), became director of the merger. The Oslo man was trained as a graphic artist, which says something about a field the packaging industry strongly belonged to: design and printing were as important a part of the product as the metalware itself. Becker-Erichsen remained Foblik's director until 1959.

=== Western Norway joins ===
Becker-Erichsen and the owners still pressed for more industrial cooperation. Aftenposten reported in October 1930 that attempts were being made to bring Stavanger Blikemballagefabrik and Bergen Blikktrykkeri into Foblik. The leading Bergen firm Sannem was also wanted, but it would be 1960 before Foblik became more than an eastern Norway phenomenon.

Bergen Blikktrykkeri had already become eastern-owned when it was taken over by Christiania Spigerverk in 1939. The Spigerverk had owned and run the tinplate rolling mill in Bergen from 1925, and the Blikktrykkeri lost when it took up competition with its own rolling mill, so the Spigerverk took over instead as owner of both the rolling mill and the Blikktrykkeri in 1939. The Spigerverk's tin manufacturing in Bergen still had to compete with the oldest and still leading firm Sannem, which kept clear of the mergers as a family-owned business, and the Spigerverk saw cooperation with Moss as the best way to meet the competition locally.

In November 1959 Bergen Blikktrykkeri announced that it would transfer all its assets to the new company Norske Blikkemballasjefabrikker–Noblikk. Foblik in Moss did the same and went into Noblikk, and the Spigerverk was paid in shares in Noblikk, which in practice became a subsidiary of Christiania Spigerverk. To sweeten the pill for the Bergen side, the head office was placed in Bergen.

=== New plant in Moss and the Sannem merger ===
Consul Becker-Erichsen had prepared the ground well for the Moss company before he stepped down and handed his life's work to Christiania Spigerverk. A large industrial site at Høyden in Moss had been bought from the municipality, and plans for a modern factory had been laid, so the transfer of head-office functions to Bergen was only temporary. The future lay in Moss, and the new factory with a new head office opened its first building stage in 1964. With this power base, fresh advances were made toward the competitor Sannem in Bergen, for the main owner Christiania Spigerverk had been a driving force in the postwar rationalization and group-building and had not given up hope of a consolidation in the tinware industry.

Now the Sannem family realized the time had come. After lengthy negotiations between the family and the Spigerverk, the merger took effect from 1 January 1966. This time the pill was sweetened by taking the family name into the new company, Noblikk–Sannem, and giving the director's chair to the family firm's third generation, Roar Sannem, who moved to Moss.

=== Noblikk–Sannem in growth ===
The immediate effect was that production in Bergen was gathered in Sannem's factory at Fjøsanger, and the Blikktrykkeri factory by the Puddefjord was closed. The 1960s and 1970s were nonetheless marked mostly by strong growth in demand and production. Large investments were made in modern, automated production equipment, and new factory premises were built; the plant in Moss was in the 1970s the largest single-story industrial building in Østfold, with Noblikk–Sannem having 45,000 square meters under roof for production and storage in Moss and 17,000 in Bergen.

Growth in area, volume, and production went hand in hand with rationalization and automation. The workforce had been up to 900 in the mid-1960s but stabilized at 600 to 700 through the 1970s. Production was large for both the home and foreign markets, and as Norwegian industry was merged, moved abroad, or closed, especially in the canning and paint industries that were the most important customers, exports became more important; 20 to 30 trailers left the factories each day, with cargo sent by train to the Continent and by ship to South America, North Africa, and the Middle East, among other places.

=== New materials and products ===
New products such as the "easy opening" lids appeared around 1970, and the old can key could be set aside. Cans for beer and soft drinks with "easy opening" were also tried in Norway, but a policy focused on environmental concerns meant these did not reach the market in earnest until the end of the century. Plastic became a new and exciting packaging material after the Second World War; Noblikk–Sannem bought its first bottle-blowing machines in 1967 and became in time a significant producer of plastic bottles. Its largest competitors were Moss Glassverk and Dyno Industrier, and the continuation of these three operations was over time gathered in a factory at Kambo near Moss, which carried on under changing foreign ownership after 2018.

=== Sannem becomes Skanem ===
Noblikk–Sannem had only one competitor in Norway: Skanem in Stavanger, formerly Stavanger Blikemballagefabrik. This tradition-rich tinware factory in the canning town had, in canning's years of decline, ended up in French hands, and the owner Pechiney Group changed the name to Skanem, from Skandinavia and the French emballage. In 1986 Skanem was bought back from France by the newly hired managing director Ole Rugland (born 1955).

The initiative for consolidation in the Norwegian industry now came from Stavanger and its new owner, since the old eastern Norway owner, Christiania Spigerverk, was in practice gone as a company, its operations moved to Mo i Rana and its ownership taken over by Elkem. When Elkem focused its operations in 1991, Noblikk–Sannem was sold, and the buyer was the competitor Skanem in Stavanger, with Ole Rugland as managing director of the new company, which was simply named Skanem.

Shortly after, production in Bergen was moved to Stavanger. Here the main product was still cans, drawing on the combined expertise in tinware production, brand-building, and graphic design and printing that the town's canning industry had led. In 1995 Skanem was Norway's only producer of cans, with over 250 million units made each year.

=== End of the tin can ===
The decline in the use of cans in the canning industry continued, however. The factory in Ryfylkegata in Stavanger was closed in the summer of 2003, and the last 40 production employees there lost their jobs. At the same time, demand for tin pails fell, and paint pails in particular, a main product for Skanem in Moss, were replaced by plastic.

In 2016 the production of tin pails in Moss was sold to the Swedish Emballator, and the last 50 workers at the factory lost their jobs; the little remaining demand for tin pails could be met by a single factory in Sweden. 144 years after Julius Anton Sannem started it all in Bergen, the production of tin packaging in Norway was now at an end.

Most of the production, now mainly graphic design and printing of self-adhesive labels, was moved to other countries, with the group head office in Stavanger. European divisions were partly sold to the American Multi-Color Corporation (MCC) in 2021, which led to reinvestment in India and Kenya, among other places, and the acquisition of several Norwegian companies and the resumption of the company's own graphic production of labels. Ole Rugland remained central in the board and management, alongside being strongly engaged in Viking Fotballklubb and property development.
