= Lysaker =

Coordinates: 59.9127°N 10.6373°E

- Town
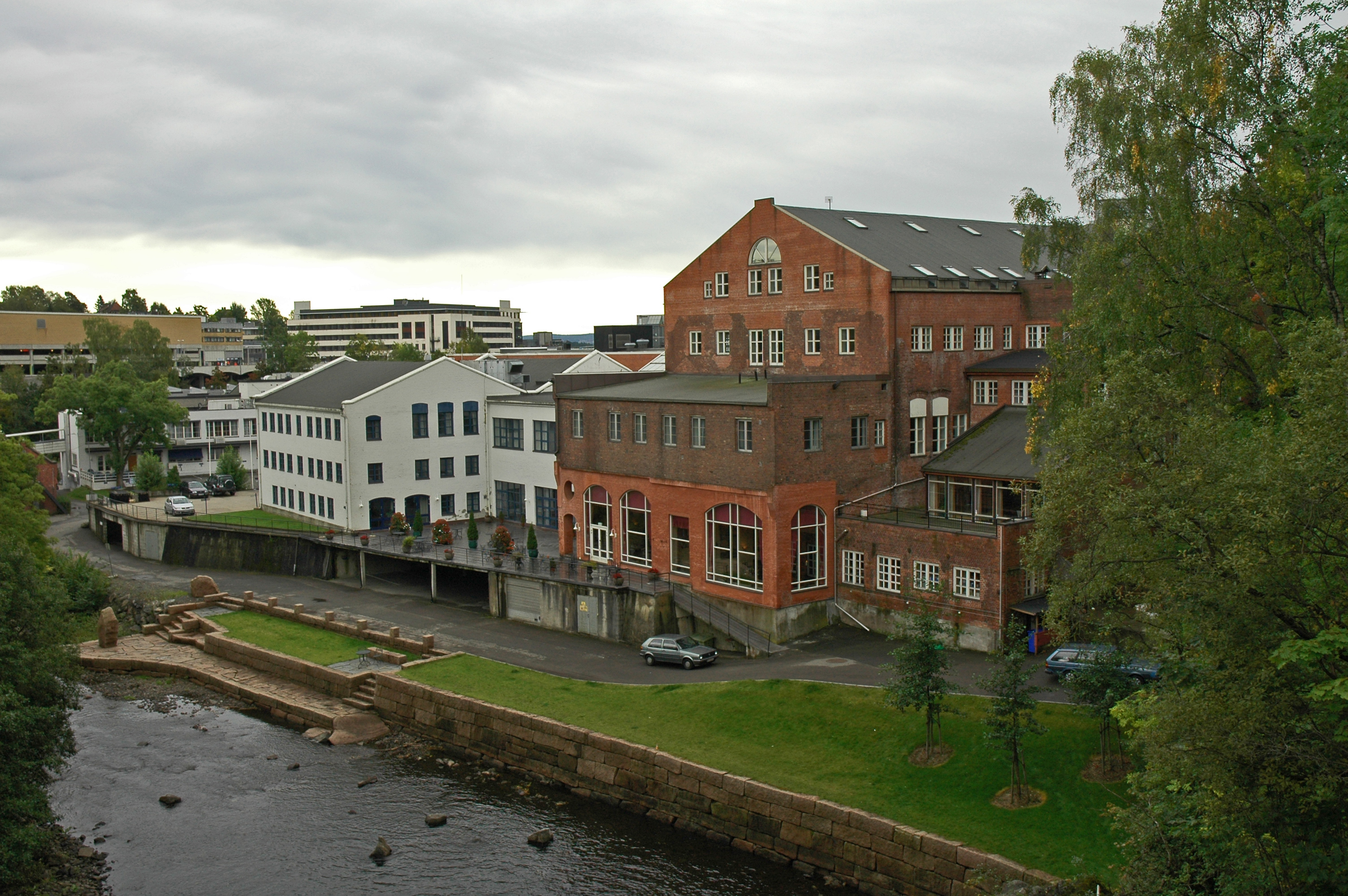
- Sections of Lysaker viewed from the bridge over Granfossen, Lysaker
- Interactive map of Lysaker
- Country: Norway
- Region: Østlandet
- County: Akershus
- Municipality: Bærum
- Time zone: UTC+01:00 (CET)
  - Summer (DST): UTC+02:00 (CEST)
- Post Code: 1324–1327 and 1366

Lysaker is an area in Bærum Municipality, Akershus County, Norway. Lysaker is the easternmost part of Bærum and borders Oslo proper. Lysaker was initially a farming community, later becoming a residential area. Today it is primarily known as a business and trade area, and a public transport hub. It is considered part of Stor-Oslo (Greater Oslo), and is home to offices of numerous domestic and international businesses.

== Geographical location ==
Lysaker is located where a stream, Lysakerelva, empties into Lysakerfjorden—a branch of the Oslofjorden. This stream is the western border of Oslo proper.

To the south-east Lysaker is bordered by the fjord. To the south-west is the Fornebu area, where one of Oslos two airports were located until Oslo Airport, Gardermoen, was expanded in order to handle all the traffic alone. To the west and north are the primarily residential areas of Stabekk and Jar. To the east is Sollerud and Lilleaker in Ullern borough.

== History ==
Lysaker, meaning "bright acres" was originally the name of a farm. Although it is more commonly believed that its name comes from "light sledging" due to the sleigh building industry in the area. Its buildings were located along the fjord on the western bank of the river, where today there are business headquarters. In 1624, with the establishment of the Kongsberg Sølvverk (Kongsberg Silver Mines) a road was built through the area, leading directly to central Oslo, and a bridge was built over the stream approximately where today's bridge is located. This led to economic development and increased settlement for in area.

In 1872 the railroad to Drammen was built, passing through the Lysaker area and crossing the stream, where a station was built. This led to further increase in business and settlement and was the beginnings of Lysaker as a transport hub.

By the 1900s Lysaker was a primarily residential area, and its main claim to fame was that the polar explorer Fridtjof Nansen took up residence there. He built a house he called Polhøgda, and lived there until his death in 1930, upon which he was buried on the grounds. Today Polhøgda houses the Fridtjof Nansen Institute, and tours of the premises are available. Simultaneously, Lysaker was home to "Lysakerkretsen" (The Lysaker Circle), a name coined for a group of artists and intellectuals who resided there in the early 1900s.

The most notable industry at the time was Granfos Brug, a major timber refining and paper manufacturing company established in 1869. Timber was floated down the Lysakerelva to the factory, where it was refined and shipped out to national and international customers by way of the fjord. Granfos Brug was closed in 1981, and the factory buildings are now an office park.

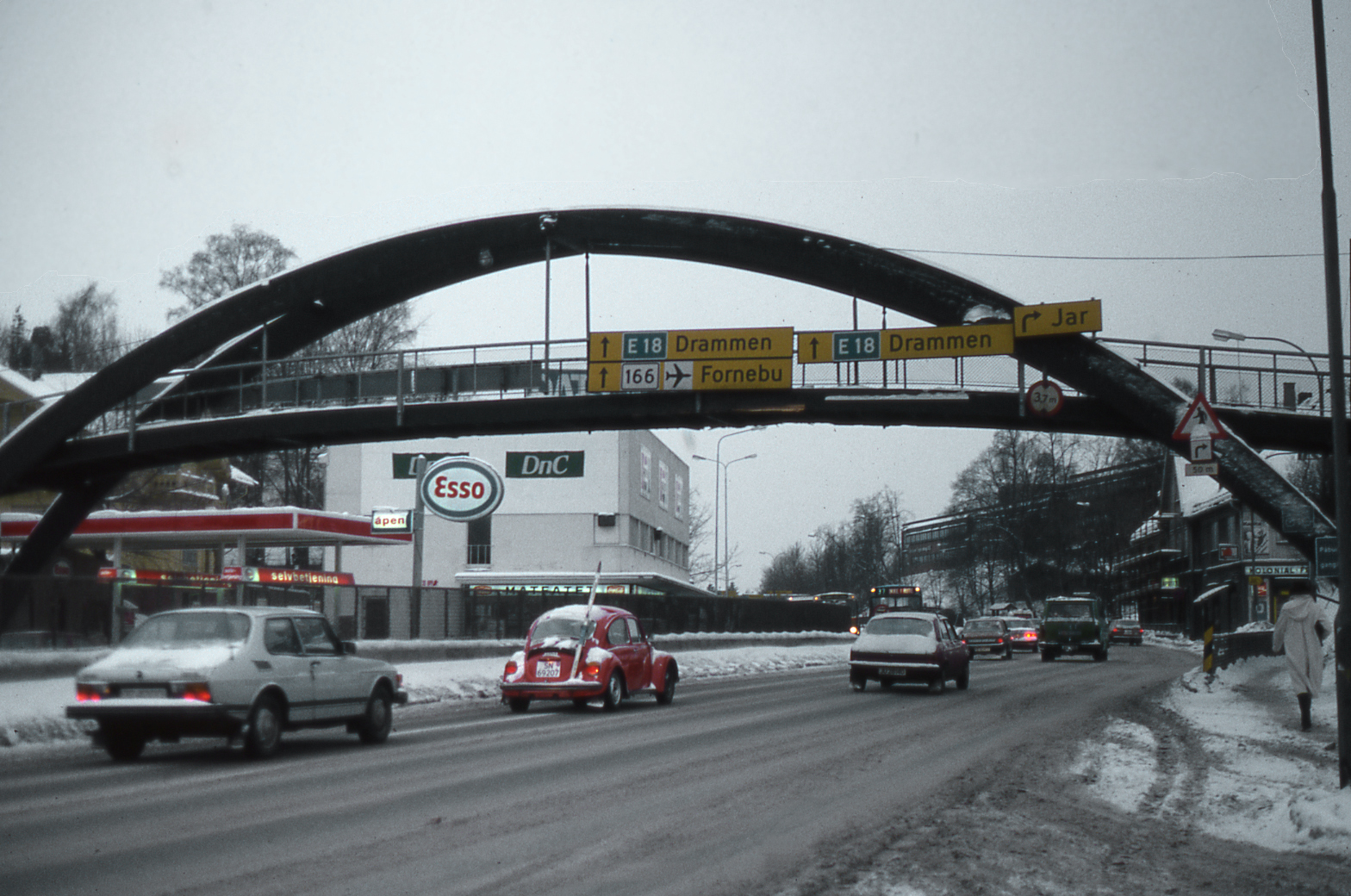
The E18 through Lysaker in 1981, before major developments

After World War II Oslo developed rapidly and so land became more scarce and expensive, eventually forcing big businesses in need of large plots of land to look at the surrounding areas. During the 1970s Lysaker became attractive due to its location between, and good transport connections with, the affluent residential areas of Bærum, Oslo proper, and Fornebu Airport. During the 1980s the old, polluted industrial sites and central residential areas became the subjects of major developments, eventually forming Lysaker into the commercial hub of today.

As more workplaces were added, so the need for transport and other services increased and businesses such as the CC Vest shopping centre were established. Unfortunately, much land in central Lysaker was occupied by motorway intersections, rails and the stream. Accordingly, in the late 1990s and 2000s large concrete "lids" were placed over the stream and motorway intersections. Thus, space was made for more buildings, as well as a major expansion of the railway station. Accordingly, the Lysaker of today is quite unrecognizable as compared to 30 years ago, with much of the central part and the railways elevated above ground level.

One architectural feature worth noting is that the characteristic round shape of the Klaveness building (belonging to the shipping company Torvald Klaveness) has become a recurring theme in newer office structures built around it. Also, the area around the stream before it goes "underground" in central Lysaker has been set aside and developed as a public park, with new or renovated bridges from Lysaker to the Lilleaker area in Oslo.

== Economy ==
Lysaker is home to numerous businesses, and several companies have international headquarters there. Among the more notable are the shipping company Wilh. Wilhelmsen, seismic technology company Petroleum Geo-Services, energy company Statkraft and airline Widerøe.

Amongst the numerous companies that have national headquarters in Lysaker are frozen foods maker Findus, insurance companies Storebrand and If, communications company Nokia and IT-companies Oracle, Microsoft and Cisco Systems.

== Transport ==
Lysaker serves as the major transport hub in the western part of Greater Oslo. Norway's busiest motorway, the E18 between Oslo and Drammen, cuts through the area – as well as the main railway line from Oslo to southern and western Norway.

Lysaker is served by numerous local and regional bus lines and railway lines, as well as a ferry service crossing the Oslo Fjord. This makes Lysaker a very busy commuter exchange.

== Notable people ==
- Ingrid Bjerkås (1901-1980), the first female minister in the Church of Norway, grew up in Lysaker
