= Maske Gruppen =

Norwegian wholesaler

Maske Gruppen AS
- Company type: Private
- Industry: Wholesale
- Founded: 1858
- Headquarters: Trondheim, Norway
- Area served: Norway
- Key people: Per Øivind Gundersen (CEO)
- Revenue: ▲NOK 1,154 million (2006)
- Operating income: NOK 0 million (2006)
- Net income: NOK 4 million (2006)
- Number of employees: 405 (2007)
- Website: www.maske.no

Maske Gruppen is a Norwegian wholesaler that distributes office supplies and healthcare products throughout the country. Based in Trondheim, it was created in 2006 after the merger between Julius Maske and S-Gruppen, with a heritage dating back to 1858.

The company has facilities from north to south in Norway, with main warehouses in Trondheim and Vinterbro in Oslo. The company operates Maske Marked stores in Bergen, Molde, Sandefjord, Stavanger, and Trondheim.
