= J. J. Ugland =

Group of Norwegian shipping companies

J. J. Ugland Holding AS
- Type: Private
- Industry: Shipping
- Founded: 1930
- Headquarters: Grimstad, Norway
- Area served: Global
- Revenue: ▲NOK 1,190 million (2006)
- Operating income: NOK 455 million (2006)
- Net income: NOK 326 million (2006)
- Owner: Knut N Tønnevold Ugland and Ellen Ugland
- Number of employees: 698 (2007)
- Website: www.jjuc.no

The J. J. Ugland Companies is a group of shipping companies based in Grimstad, Norway.

== History ==
The company was first established as Uglands Rederi in 1930 by ship owner Johan Milmar Ugland (1881-1960). His sons Johan Jørgen Ugland (1921-2010) and Andreas Kjell Lund Ugland (1925-2019) subsequently assumed control of the company.

The group operates a fleet of supramax dry cargo vessels, handysize bulk carriers, shuttle tankers, barges, heavy weight crane vessels and tug boats. The company also owns the EPC facility, A.S Nymo. Shipping is performed by the subsidiaries A/S Uglands Rederi and Ugland Shipping AS, while bulk shipping is performed by Ugland Bulk Transport A/S. Operation of the barges is performed by the Stavanger-based Ugland Construction AS. Technical management is performed by Ugland Marine Services AS.
