= Arthur Soltvedt Møbelfabrikk =

Norwegian furniture business and manufacturer

Arthur Soltvedt Møbelfabrikk, also known as Pega Furniture, was a Norwegian family business established in 1942. It was one of the first Norwegian furniture manufacturers with a focus on serial production and one of the major participators in Norwegian furniture exports during the 1950s and 1960s. Production was discontinued in 2011.

== History ==
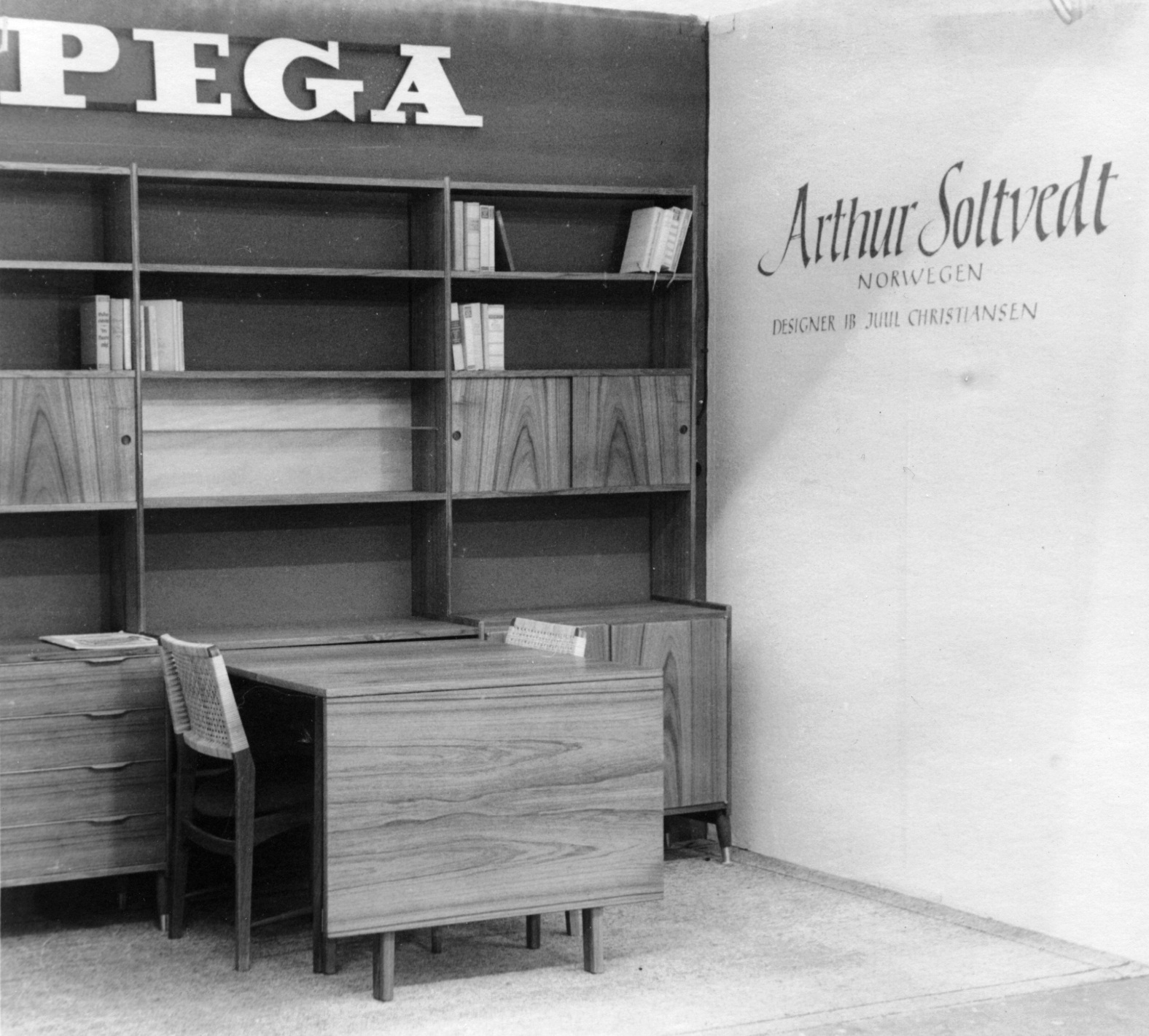
Pega-system furniture stand at an international furniture convention in Cologne, 1960.

First established in Øystese during the Second World War, the business relocated to the village of Florvåg on the island Askøy, just north of Bergen, in 1948.

The business originally manufactured simple bedroom furniture, like small beds, but during cooperation with Danish designer Ib Juul Christiansen in 1952 the Pega furniture system was developed. This system would become the breakthrough of the company both nationally and internationally, and was based around the concept of being able to combine the various different furniture types in many different ways. Over 50% of production were for exports, mainly to the US and Germany. Exports to the US were handled by the companies Scandialine and ScandiCraft.

Due to the massive amounts of production needed for exports, the company moved to new locales slightly north of the area where they first were located. This increased the production are from 500 sq m to 2600 sq m, and opened up the possibility of employing more personnel for the production.

The company moved yet again in 1979, this time to Follese on the western side of Askøy.

During the 1980s the company started suffering financially due to the market shifting towards larger corporations, making it more difficult for smaller, independent manufacturers to compete. The decline continued during the '90s and parts of the market for exports disappeared. The need for employees was reduced; in 2003 the company had only 12.

The financial crisis ruined the last part of the export market, and the board of directors decided to discontinue production in 2011.
