= Helgø Matsenter =

Norwegian supermarket chain

Helgø (full name: Helgø Matsenter) was a Norwegian supermarket chain, with stores in one of Norway's 19 counties, Rogaland.

Helgø was founded in 1958 when Halvar Helgø opened a retail shop in Stavanger; today there are seven supermarkets. All of these are in the southern part of Rogaland (3 in Sandnes and 2 in Stavanger).

The chain's motto was "We have never tried to be the cheapest, but be the No. 1 in quality"
