= Synnøve Finden =

Norwegian dairy company

Synnøve Finden AS
- Type: Aksjeselskap
- Industry: Dairy
- Founded: 1996; 30 years ago
- Headquarters: Oslo, Norway
- Area served: Norway
- Products: Cheese; Butter; Juice; Cereal; Ham
- Revenue: ▲NOK 1,251.4 million (2005)
- Operating income: NOK 21.4 million (2005)
- Net income: NOK -10.6 million (2005)
- Number of employees: 395 (2005)
- Website: www.synnove.no

Synnøve Finden is a Norwegian dairy company that produces cheese, butter, and juice with farms in Alvdal Municipality and Namsos Municipality. The company launched its yellow cheese on 21 September 1996 and brown cheese in 1997. The company was listed on the Oslo Stock Exchange. Synnøve Finden is today the only Norwegian challenger to Tine in the Norwegian cheese market.

== History ==
Synnøve Finden (1882-1957) is today considered to be Norway's first female cheese founder and factory owner. Together with Pernille Holmen and her daughter Evy (13), Synnøve Finden opened her first cheese factory in 1928 on the Grefsen Plateau in Oslo. The breakthrough for the production came when the cheese was first introduced to the housewives' associations Hjemmenes Vel. In 1987, Synnøve Finden A / S was sold to Dag Swanstrøm and production moved to Enebakk Municipality. With Swanstrøm also came the breakthrough (1996) to be a challenger to the dairy monopoly Norwegian Dairies (Tine) and the cooperative. In January 1997, the Minister of Agriculture Gunhild Øyangen from the Labour Party stated that the state and the Norwegian Farmers' Association had agreed to open up for competition in the dairy sector. In 1995, the new owner had gone to purchase the closed Tine dairy in Alvdal Municipality.

From the period 1996–2008, Synnøve Finden became Tine's first nationwide competitor with both yellow cheese and brunost. In 2008, the company got new owners, Norwegian founders Jan Bodd and Stig Sunde. Ten years after the takeover, Karl Kristian Sunde joined as partner and owner.

=== Synnøve Korea ===
In 2020, Synnøve Finden expanded its sales of brown cheese to South Korea, where more than 52,000 brunost have been sold by May 2021.
