= Rolv Høiland =

Norwegian magazine editor (1926–2001)

Rolv Høiland (26 September 1926 – 2001) was a Norwegian magazine editor.

He was born in Stavanger, and started his career as a journalist there. He later enrolled at the University of Oslo. He was a sub-editor for the military newspapers Mannskapsavisa and Militær Orientering, and was promoted to editor-in-chief in 1953. He later took up other tasks, and was editor-in-chief of Forsvarets Forum from 1980 to 1983. The magazine was started in 1980 as a continuation of Mannskapsavisa. He was a board member of the Norwegian Press Association from 1975 to 1988 and of Periodisk Presses Redaktørforening.

Høiland also helped start the men's magazine Vi Menn in 1951. He contributed mainly with military topics here as well. After withdrawing from Forsvarets Forum in 1983, at which time he criticized active military officers in general for not taking part in the public debate, he rejoined Vi Menn as a freelance writer. He also contributed with military articles to the encyclopedia Cappelens leksikon between 1982 and 1987. He has written humorous books, and wrote Per Røed: den ukjente sabotør about the saboteur Per Røed. He was also press director for the FIS Nordic World Ski Championships 1966.

He resided in Jar in his later life. He died in October 2001 following long-term illness.
