= TGS-NOPEC Geophysical Company =

Energy data and analytics company

TGS
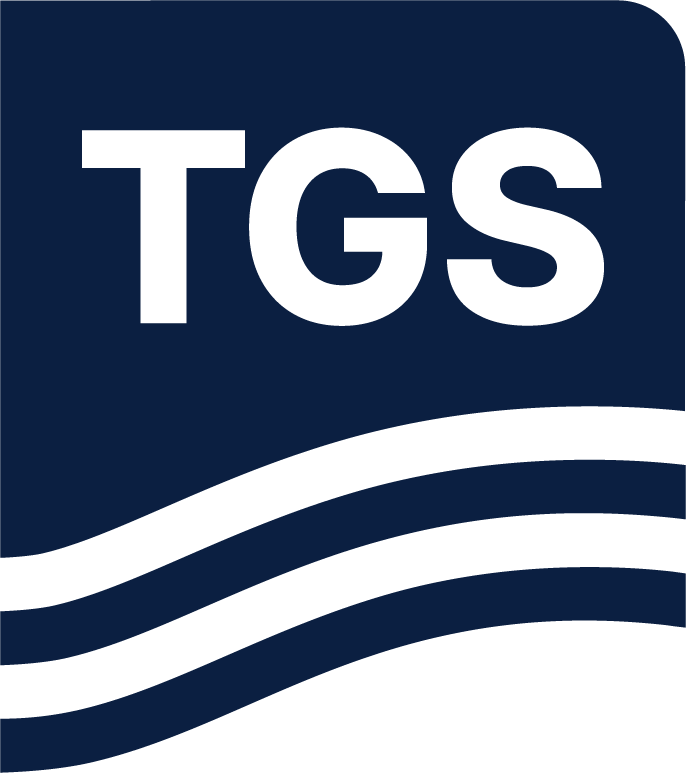
- Type: Public company
- Traded as: OSE: TGS
- Industry: Oil & Gas
- Founded: 1981 by Prentis Tomlinson
- Headquarters: Oslo, Norway
- Area served: Global
- Key people: Kristian Johansen (CEO) Sven Bore Larsen ,(CFO), Christopher Finlayson (Chairman)
- Services: Energy data and analytics, acquisition solutions, imaging services, new energy solutions, reservoir characterization, well and log data, asset management, and data management.
- Revenue: US $585.6 million (2019)
- Net income: US $113.111 million (2019)
- Total assets: US $ 2,194,889 million (2019)
- Total equity: US $1,292.979 million (2013)
- Number of employees: 2,000
- Website: tgs.com

TGS, formerly TGS NOPEC Geophysical Company ASA is an energy data and analytics company. It gathers, interprets, and markets seismic and geophysical data regarding subsurface terrains worldwide in order to evaluate oil and gas formations for drilling operations. TGS is listed on the Oslo Stock Exchange, was founded by a 1998 merger of TGS (Tomlinson Geophysical Services Inc.), Calibre Geophysical Co. Inc (founded in 1981), and NOPEC (Norwegian Petroleum Exploration Consultants) International ASA founded in 1981, with financial headquarters in Oslo, Norway and operational headquarters in Houston, Texas.

The Company is led by CEO Kristian Johansen with nearly 2,000 employees around the globe with main offices located in Oslo, Houston, London, Rio de Janeiro and Perth.

== See also ==
- List of Norwegian companies
