= Møller Mobility Group =

- Company type: Private
- Industry: Car retail
- Founded: 1936
- Founder: Harald A. Møller
- Headquarters: Oslo, Norway
- Area served: Norway; Baltic
- Key people: Harald Møller Chairman
- Products: Volkswagen; Audi; Škoda; SEAT
- Revenue: NOK 11,479 million (2006)
- Operating income: NOK 625 million (2006)
- Net income: NOK 461 million (2006)
- Owner: Møller family
- Number of employees: 4282 (2019)
- Website: www.moller.no

Møllergruppen is a company within car import, sale, repair, financial leasing, real estate development and other investments. It is the largest importer of vehicles in Norway, with responsibility for the Volkswagen Group vehicles, including Volkswagen, Audi, Škoda and the repair of SEAT. In addition the group has import of Volkswagen and Audi in Latvia and Lithuania, and Estonia. The company is privately owned by the Møller family.

== History ==
The group was founded as Strømmen Auto AS in 1936 by Harald A. Møller with sale of Dodge and DeSoto. In 1946 the company changed name to Harald A. Møller AS and became the importer of Volkswagen in 1948, as well as Audi in 1974. In 1983 the subsidiary Møller US Import AS is founded with responsibility for import of Dodge, and eventually Chrysler and Jeep. In 1985 the group gets its present name after merging with Hamas. SEAT is started imported in 1989 and Škoda in 1991 after they have been bought by VAG. However, in 2003 and after Daimler-Benz and Chrysler Corporation were merged to DaimlerChrysler, Møller US Import was sold to Bertel O Steen, who had imported Mercedes-Benz. In the same year the SEAT import is taken over by the factory, though repairs are retained by Møllergruppen. Also in 2003 the group is divided in two, when the Schage family demerge the real estate investments.
