= Lefdal =

Norwegian retail company

- Trade name: Lefdal Elektromarked AS
- Type: Aksjeselskap
- Industry: Consumer electronics
- Founded: 1936
- Defunct: January 15, 2018
- Fate: Incorporated into Elkjøp
- Headquarters: Lørenskog
- Website: http://www.lefdal.com/

Lefdal was one of Norway's biggest electronics and household appliance stores. Lefdal had 19 warehouses nationwide. In the first quarter of 2018, Lefdal and Elkjøp were merged into one company, with the name Elkjøp.

The company was founded in 1936 with the first store at Bekkestua in Bærum, and in 1996 Elkjøp Nordic acquired the retail part of the company. Lefdal Installasjon consequently continued as a separate, independent entity and also retained the web address lefdal.no.
