= Norconsult =

Norwegian engineering consultancy

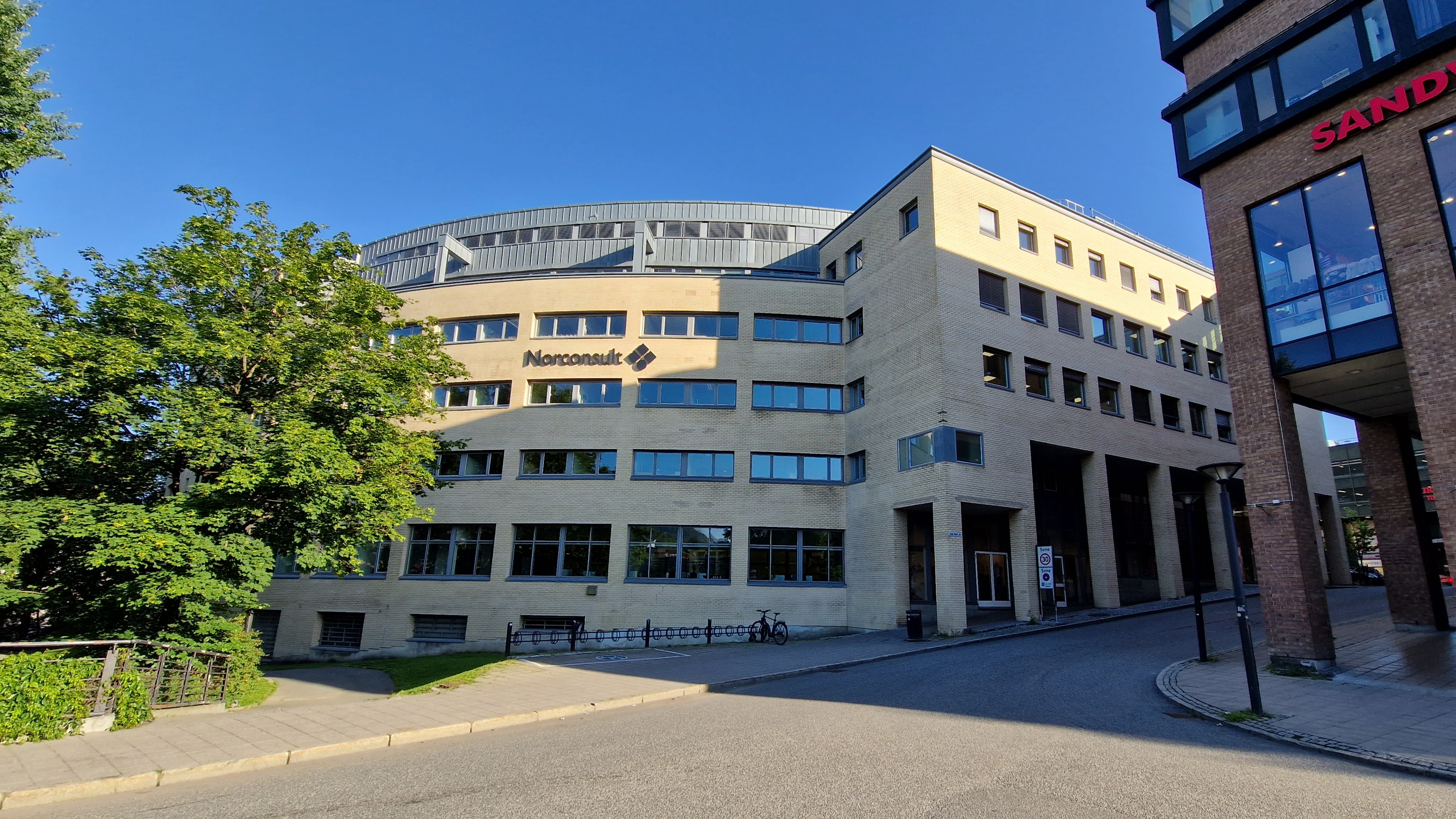
- Norconsult headquarters in Sandvika
- Traded as: OSE: NORCO
- Industry: Engineering consulting
- Founded: 1929; 97 years ago in Oslo, Norway
- Headquarters: Sandvika, Norway
- Area served: Nordic countries; international projects
- Services: Engineering, architecture, environmental and project-management consulting
- Number of employees: approx. 7,200 (2025)
- Website: norconsult.com

Norconsult is a Norwegian engineering consultancy headquartered in Sandvika, Norway. The firm provides engineering, architectural, environmental and project-management consulting services, with offices in Norway, Sweden, Denmark, Iceland, Finland and Poland. Founded in 1929, Norconsult was for several decades wholly owned by its employees before listing on the Oslo Stock Exchange in November 2023. Following a series of acquisitions in the 2020s, including the Aas-Jakobsen Group in 2025, the company employed approximately 7,200 staff in around 140 offices.

== History ==
Norconsult traces its origins to the engineering consultancy "Ingeniør A. B. Berdal", established in Oslo in 1929 by Aanund Bjørnsson Berdal. In 1989 the firm merged with Sivilingeniør Elliot Strømme (founded 1939) to form Berdal Strømme AS. Berdal Strømme acquired majority control of Norconsult International in 1992, and the combined company adopted the Norconsult name in 1998.

By the late 2010s, Teknisk Ukeblad reported Norconsult as the largest engineering consultancy in Norway by revenue, with reported turnover of approximately NOK 5.4 billion in 2018.

In November 2023 Norconsult was admitted to trading on the Oslo Stock Exchange under the ticker OSE: NORCO, following an offering of approximately NOK 2.1 billion. The listing was reported as the largest on Oslo Børs in 2023. Before the listing, the firm was owned by its approximately 3,700 employees. The decision to list was taken in response to changes in Norwegian tax legislation; about 95 percent of employees voted in favour of the listing.

== Operations ==
Norconsult provides services to public- and private-sector clients in fields including transport infrastructure, buildings, energy, water, environment and urban planning. Following the acquisition of Aas-Jakobsen in 2025, the company employed approximately 7,200 staff in around 140 offices in Norway, Sweden, Denmark, Iceland, Finland and Poland.

== Notable projects ==
Norconsult has provided engineering and consulting services on a number of large infrastructure projects in Norway and abroad. In Norway, the firm was selected by Avinor as a consultancy partner for the relocation and construction of Bodø Airport, and has worked on the Rogfast project on European route E39, a subsea road tunnel designed to be the world's longest and deepest of its kind upon completion. In hydropower, Norconsult provided engineering design services for the Vamma 12 expansion of the Vamma Hydroelectric Power Station, a run-of-the-river plant on the river Glomma reported to be the largest of its type in Norway. Internationally, the firm has been engaged on the Upper Tamakoshi Hydroelectric Project in Nepal, described as the country's largest hydropower development, as part of a joint venture with the German engineering firm Lahmeyer International.

== Acquisitions ==
Norconsult expanded internationally and into adjacent specialisms through a series of acquisitions. The 2007 purchase of GF Konsult AB established the company's Swedish subsidiary, Norconsult AB. The 2017 acquisition of ARA Engineering created its Icelandic subsidiary, Norconsult ehf. In 2019 the firm acquired the Norwegian wind-energy specialist Kjeller Vindteknikk, including its operations in Sweden and Finland, and in December 2024 it acquired Sigma Civil in Sweden.

In June 2025 Norconsult agreed to acquire the Norwegian engineering firm Aas-Jakobsen Group for an enterprise value of approximately NOK 1.43 billion, described in trade press as the largest acquisition in the company's history; the transaction closed in August 2025. In November 2025 Norconsult agreed to acquire Metier Group, a project-management consultancy, from the American firm Tetra Tech.
