= Petroleum Geo-Services =

Seismic services company

Coordinates: 59°54′44.80″N 10°38′23.71″E

PGS
- Type: Allmennaksjeselskap
- Traded as: OSE: PGS
- Industry: Petroleum
- Founded: 1991
- Defunct: 2024
- Fate: Acquired by TGS ASA
- Headquarters: Lilleakerveien, Norway
- Area served: Global
- Key people: Walter Qvam (Chairman), Rune Olav Pedersen (President and CEO)
- Products: Geophysical services
- Revenue: ▼USD 590.0 million USD ^{(2021)}
- Net income: ▲USD (179.4) Million USD ^{(2021)}
- Total assets: ▼USD 1,792.8 Million USD ^{(2021)}
- Total equity: ▼USD 245.1 Million USD ^{(2021)}
- Number of employees: ▼1800 ^{(2016)}
- Website: www.pgs.com

PGS (Petroleum Geo-Services) was a technologically focused oilfield service company involved in providing geophysical services worldwide. Its seismic service offerings helped oil companies identify oil and gas reserves offshore. Its product offerings ranged from survey planning and data acquisition to advanced imaging, reservoir analysis, and interpretation.

PGS was founded in Norway in 1991. The company operated:

- 8 offshore seismic vessels (6 active in winter season)
- 1 processing and imaging megacenters
- 3 main offices Oslo, London and Houston, plus a network of local offices employing around 60 nationalities

PGS had a presence in over 10 countries with headquarters in Oslo, Norway. The company was headquartered at Lysaker until 2013 when it moved to nearby Lilleaker. PGS shares was listed on the Oslo Stock Exchange (OSE:PGS).

In 2024, PGS merged with TGS following an all-share transaction valued at approximately NOK 9.3 billion (around $864 million at the time of announcement). The merger was completed on 1 July 2024, creating an integrated group focused on geophysical data, seismic services, and energy data solutions.
