= Bertel O. Steen =

Norwegian trading company

Bertel O. Steen AS
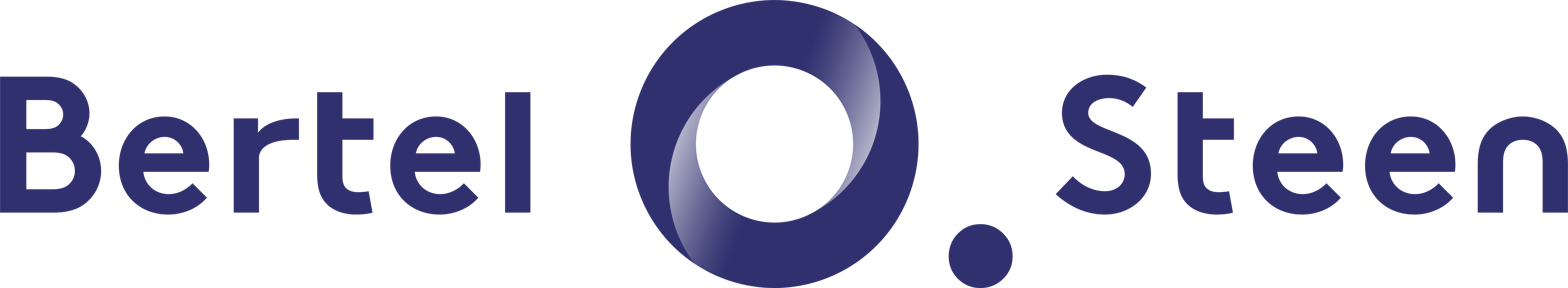
- Company type: Private
- Industry: Retail
- Founder: Bertel Otto Steen
- Headquarters: Norway
- Area served: Norway
- Revenue: NOK 12 billion (2011)
- Owner: Bertel O. Steen family
- Number of employees: 2,660 (2011)
- Website: bos.no

Bertel O. Steen AS is one of Norway’s largest service and trading companies, and has its headquarters in Lørenskog municipality. At year-end 2011, the Group had 2,660 man-years and operating revenues of NOK 11.7 billion.

The Group is divided into three main segments: Cars, Other Business and Real Estate. The Car segment comprises Car Imports, Car Retail and Car Financing. Other Business comprises Agriculture, Sports and Leisure, Industry and Security and Snap Drive AS. The Real Estate segment comprises the Group's properties for car retail and other commercial properties.

The car import and retail segment constituted 82% of turnover in 2011, with the other segments making up the remaining 18%. A total 98% of the Group's turnover was generated from sales in Norway.

== Car import, retail, financing ==
Import of Mercedes-Benz, smart®, Peugeot and Kia. The Group's importer contract for Chrysler, Jeep and Dodge was terminated on 31 May 2011. Daihatsu has also decided to withdraw from Europe, although Bertel O. Steen will continue to import Daihatsu parts, in order to cater for existing customers.

A nationwide dealer network distributing the Group’s car makes. The main volume of sales takes place via Bertel O. Steen Detalj AS with subsidiaries.

Comprises Bertel O. Steen Finans AS, a company providing financing via a nationwide dealer network distributing the Group’s car makes.

Snap Drive AS is an independent chain of car workshops, with 21 workshops located in major cities and towns in Norway.

== Agriculture ==
Comprises the company A-K maskiner AS which both imports and retails agricultural machines. The company has 51 retail outlets, of which 31 are wholly owned. The company's core business area is the sale of tractors and related agricultural equipment. A-K maskiner AS represents strong international brands within the different units, including tractor brands Case IH and New Holland. The tool brands retailed by the company include[Amazone, Pöttinger, Orkel, Duun and Reime.

Sports and Leisure: This segment comprises Viking fottøy AS with its subsidiaries both in Norway and abroad. Viking fottøy AS develops, markets and sells footwear. The company's product brands are Viking, Cherrox and KangaROOS. The Sports and Leisure segment also includes the company Berghaus Nordic AS, which was established in January 2011. Berghaus Nordic AS is a joint venture with Pentland Group, owners of the Berghaus brand.

== Real Estate ==
Comprises Bertel O. Steen Eiendom AS with subsidiaries, which manages a substantial property portfolio covering approx. 150,000 m2 of property connected with the car industry and other business segments. Approximately half of the portfolio constitutes property related to the car industry.

== Industry and Security ==
Comprises Bertel O. Steen Industri AS with subsidiaries, which represent supply of marine engines, supply of security equipment and military supplies, respectively involved in: the sale and service of propulsion engines and generator sets, mainly for maritime vessels; the supply of security products and technical systems for the professional security market; products and specialised vehicles principally for the Norwegian Armed Forces and police force. Furthermore, Bertel O. Steen Industri acts as agent for major defence investments.
