= Bama Gruppen =

Norwegian food distributor

Bama Gruppen AS
- Type: Private
- Industry: Wholesale
- Founded: 1886
- Headquarters: Oslo, Norway
- Area served: Norway
- Products: Fruit; Vegetables; Potatoes; Berries
- Revenue: ▲NOK 5,637 million (2006)
- Operating income: NOK 305 million (2006)
- Net income: NOK 219 million (2006)
- Number of employees: 1,700 (2007)
- Website: www.bama.no

Bama Gruppen AS is Norway's largest private distributor of fruit and vegetables. Bama Gruppen is engaged in wholesale trading of imported and Norwegian-produced fresh produce in fruits, vegetables and flowers.

The corporation was founded as Chr. Matthiessen AS in 1886 when Christian Marius Emil Matthiessen (1850–1918) from Kristiansand started a lumber business. Banana imports began in 1905 as the first in Europe outside the United Kingdom. The company was eventually named Banana Matthiessen. In 1981, the corporate name was changed to Bama Gruppen AS.

The company has five divisions: retail, industry, institutions, flowers and convenience shops. On the retail market it delivers produce to the two wholesalers Norgesgruppen and Reitangruppen. Bama is an official sponsor of the Norway national football team.
