= Torvald Klaveness Group =

Norwegian shipping company

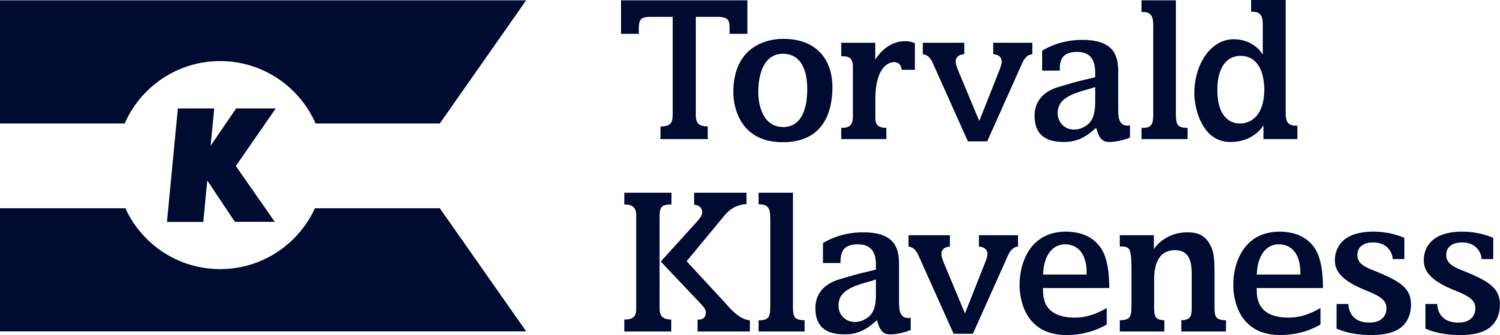
- Founded: 1946
- Founder: Torvald Faye Klaveness
- Headquarters: Oslo
- Number of locations: 4
- Area served: Worldwide
- Key people: Trond Harald Klaveness (Chairman)

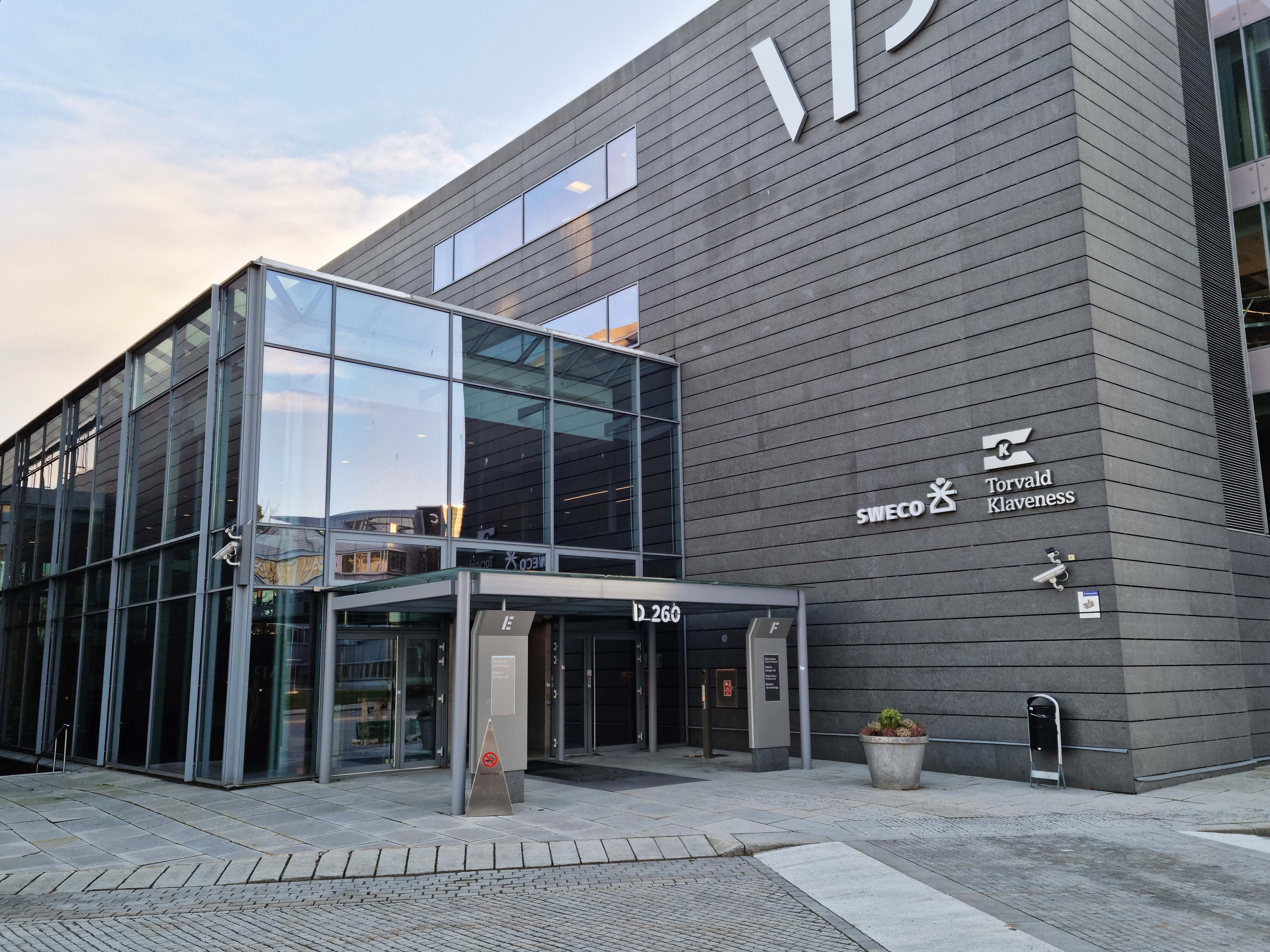
Headquarters at Vækerø, Oslo.

The Torvald Klaveness Group is a Norwegian shipping company founded in 1946. Klaveness Marine was demerged from it in 2011.

== History ==
The company was founded by Torvald Faye Klaveness in 1946, who served as the company's president and chief executive officer until 1989. He was succeeded by his son Tom Erik Klaveness, who was later succeeded by another of Torvald's sons Trond Harald Klaveness in 2006.

By the early 2000s the company owned a fleet of almost 150 bulk cargo vessels. In 2011 the two Klaveness brothers decided to demerge the holding and real estate division, forming Klaveness Marine with Tom Erik Klaveness as majority owner. Trond Harald Klaveness continued in the Torvald Klaveness Group which remained a shipping company, but now as president whereas Lasse Kristoffersen became the new chief executive.

In 2018, the company announced it was forming new bulker company Klaveness Combination Carriers, which subsequently declared listing on Oslo Stock Exchange. In January 2020, Klaveness joined forces with Japan's Marubeni to form the world's largest panamax pool.

In April 2022, Lasse Kristoffersen signed off as company CEO, with Ernst Meyer becoming the new President and CEO.
