= Romsåsen =

Coordinates: 59°35′17″N 11°06′33″E

Romsåsen, in Askim in Indre Østfold in Østfold county, Norway, is a hill that has an old nickel mine and minerals. It is now protected by law.
