= Kykkelsrud =

Village in Indre Østfold municipality, Norway

Coordinates: 59°35′N 11°06′E

Kykkelsrud is a village in Askim municipality, Norway. Located a few kilometres west of the town Askim, it is a part of the urban area of the same name, which has a population of 12,570. Kykkelsrud, located on the east bank of the Glomma river, has a power plant which harnesses the Kykkelsrud waterfall. Immediately north of the village is the four-lane Smaalenene Bridge, opened in 2010 and carrying the European Route E18 over the Glomma.
