= Fossum =

Fossum may refer to:

== Places ==
- Fossum, Akershus, Norway
- Fossum, Oslo, Norway
- Fossum, Telemark, Norway
- Fossum Bridge, Østfold, Norway
- Fossum Township, Minnesota, United States

== Other uses ==
- Fossum (surname)
- Fossum IF, sports club from Bærum, Norway
