= Indre Østfold Municipality =

Indre Østfold Municipality Indre Østfold kommune
- Municipality
- Coat of arms

- Østfold within Norway

- Indre Østfold within Østfold
- Coordinates: 59°34′56″N 11°10′13″E
- Country: Norway
- County: Østfold
- District: Indre Østfold

Government
  - Mayor: Saxe Frøshaug (Senterpartiet)

Area
  - Total: 791.93 km^{2} (305.77 sq mi)
  - Land: 755.38 km^{2} (291.65 sq mi)

Population (2020)
  - Total: 45,201
  - Rank: #23 in Norway
  - Density: 59.839/km^{2} (154.98/sq mi)
- Demonym: Indre Østfolding

Official language
  - Norwegian form: Bokmål
- Time zone: UTC+01:00 (CET)
  - Summer (DST): UTC+02:00 (CEST)
- ISO 3166 code: NO-3118
- Website: Official website

Indre Østfold is a municipality in the region of Indre Østfold in Østfold county. The municipality was established on 1 January 2020 by a merger of the five municipalities Askim, Eidsberg, Hobøl, Spydeberg and Trøgstad. The municipality has a total population of just under 45,000, spread out over several small towns such as Askim, Mysen, Spydeberg, Skjønhaug and Tomter. This is quite unusual for Norwegian municipalities.

== Notable people ==
=== Public service and public thinking ===
- Haakon IV of Norway (1204 in Eidsberg – 1263), King of Norway 1217–1263
- Jacob Nicolai Wilse (1736–1801), parish priest in Spydeberg and Eidsberg
- Nils Christian Frederik Hals (1758 in Eidsberg – 1838 in Trøgstad), lieutenant colonel, commanded and surrendered Fredrikstad Fortress
- Olai Pedersen Wiig (1802 in Trøgstad – 1887)‚ politician, mayor of Trøgstad 1844 to 1847
- Halvor Heyerdahl Rasch (1805 in Eidsberg – 1883), zoologist and academic
- Thea Foss (1857 in Eidsberg – 1927), founded Foss Maritime, the real-life inspiration for Tugboat Annie
- Emma Hjorth (1858 in Hobøl – 1921), founder of the Emma Hjorth Home, the country's first large institution for people with intellectual disabilities
- Nordal Wille (1858 in Hobøl – 1924), botanist
- Adam Hiorth (1879 in Spydeberg – 1961), barrister and playwright
- Olga Bjoner (1887 in Askim – 1969), journalist and Nazi politician
- Jørgen Adolf Lier (1906–1994), politician, mayor of Askim several times
- Anton Skulberg (1921–2012), scientist and politician, mayor of Spydeberg 1963–1967
- Dagfinn Føllesdal (born 1932 in Askim), Norwegian-American philosopher
- Oddbjørn Engvold (born 1938 in Askim), astronomer
- Erik Mollatt (born 1941), businessperson, lives in Hobøl

=== The arts ===
- Enevold Thømt (1878 in Askim – 1958), decorative painter inspired by Norwegian folk art
- Kirsten Sørlie (1926 in Askim – 2013), actress and stage director
- Vidar Sandem (born 1947 in Trøgstad), actor, playwright and theatre director
- Jan Garbarek (born 1947 in Mysen), jazz saxophonist
- Cecilie Løveid (born 1951 in Mysen), novelist, poet, playwright and writer of children's books
- Rune Rudberg (born 1961 in Trøgstad), singer of dansband music
- Lene Alexandra (born 1981 in Trøgstad), singer, TV personality and model
- Jon Audun Baar (born 1986 in Tomter, Hobøl), jazz drummer.

=== Sport ===
- Brothers Henning Solberg (born 1973) and Petter Solberg (born 1974), former professional rallycross drivers, born in Askim and grew up in Spydeberg
- Jens Kristian Skogmo (born 1987 in Askim), footballer with 285 club caps
- Vibeke Skofterud (born 1980 in Askim), Olympic Gold medallist in cross-country skiing
