= Virolahti =

Virolahti Vederlax
- Municipality
- Virolahden kunta Vederlax kommun
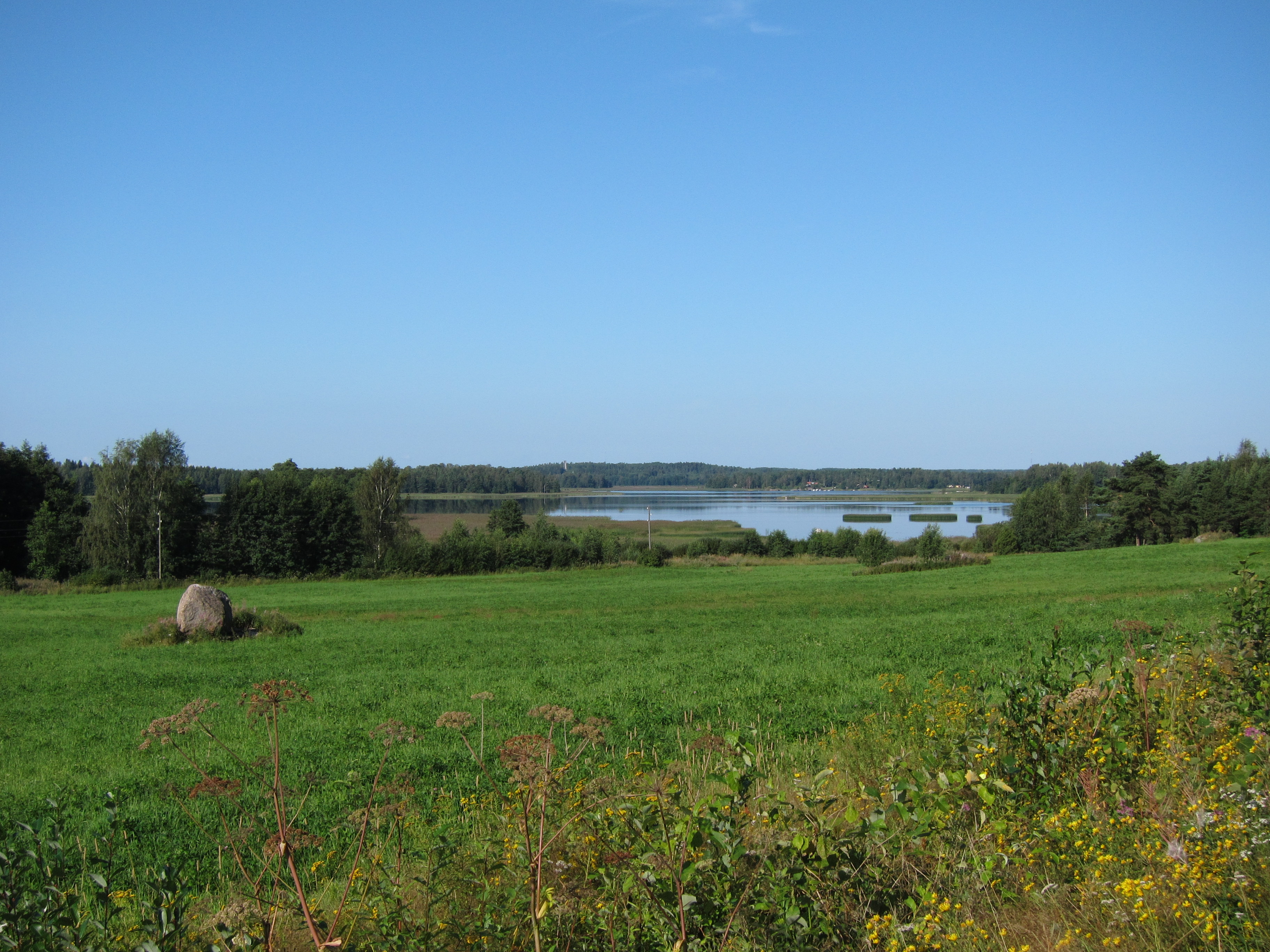

- Coat of arms

- Location of Virolahti in Finland
- Interactive map of Virolahti
- Coordinates: 60°35′N 027°42′E
- Country: Finland
- Region: Kymenlaakso
- Sub-region: Kotka-Hamina
- Seat: Virojoki

Government
  - Municipality manager: Topi Heinänen

Area (2018-01-01)
  - Total: 558.92 km^{2} (215.80 sq mi)
  - Land: 372.47 km^{2} (143.81 sq mi)
  - Water: 186.97 km^{2} (72.19 sq mi)
  - Rank: 208th largest in Finland

Population (2025-12-31)
  - Total: 2,751
  - Rank: 222nd largest in Finland
  - Density: 7.39/km^{2} (19.1/sq mi)

Population by native language
  - Finnish: 92.6% (official)
  - Swedish: 0.4%
  - Others: 7%

Population by age
  - 0 to 14: 11.7%
  - 15 to 64: 55.3%
  - 65 or older: 33%
- Time zone: UTC+02:00 (EET)
  - Summer (DST): UTC+03:00 (EEST)
- Climate: Dfb
- Website: virolahti.fi

Virolahti (Finnish: [ˈʋiroˌlɑhti]; Swedish: Vederlax) is the southeasternmost municipality of Finland on the border of Russia. It is located in the Kymenlaakso region. The municipality has a population of 2,751 (31 December 2025) and covers an area of 558.92 square kilometres (215.80 sq mi), of which 186.97 km^{2} (72.19 sq mi) is water. The population density is 7.39 inhabitants per square kilometre (19.1/sq mi).

The municipality is unilingually Finnish.

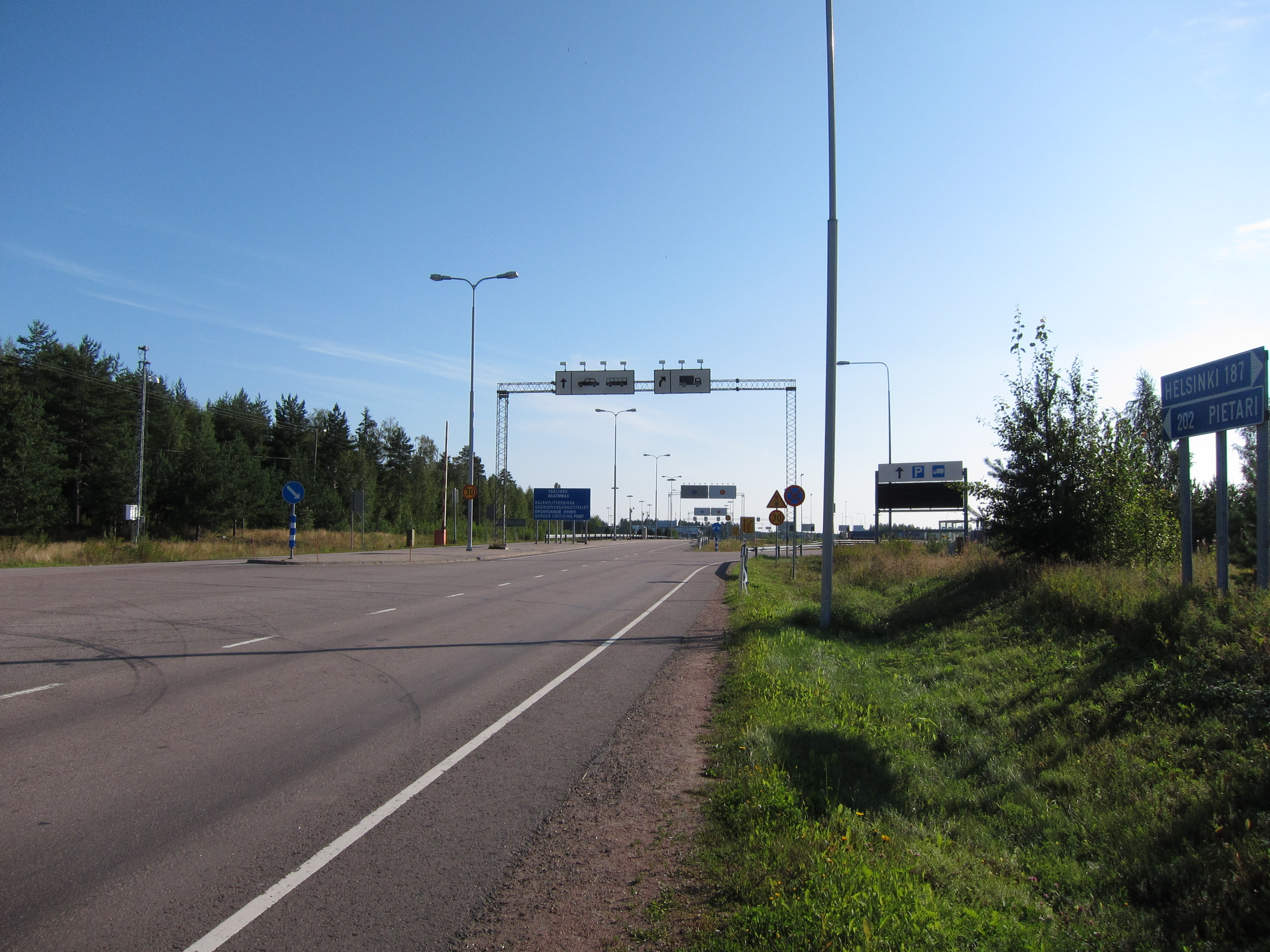
Vaalimaa's border checkpoint along the European route E18 on the Finnish side in Virolahti

The Vaalimaa border crossing, which connects the municipality with Russia, is located in Virolahti.

== History ==
Virolahti is named after Estonians from Virumaa who traded around the nearby bay, which is also called Virolahti. The first mention of Virolahti dates to 1336. It is mentioned as an independent parish in 1370.

A small part of Virolahti was ceded by Sweden to Russia in the Treaty of Uusikaupunki in 1721. The border was located slightly further west than the modern Finnish-Russian border. In the treaty of Turku of 1743, the rest of Virolahti was ceded to Russia. The northern part of Virolahti became the Miehikkälä parish in 1863.

Before World War I the Russian Emperor Nicholas II used to spend summers with his family in the archipelago of Virolahti with his yacht Standart, Finland being an autonomous province within the Russian Empire between 1809 and 1917.

Virolahti lost some of its area (over 100 km^{2} (39 sq mi)) to Soviet Union in Paris Peace Treaties, 1947, after World War II.

== Villages in 1939 ==
Villages marked with an asterisk (*) are now completely or partially on the Russian side:

Alapihlaja, Alaurpala*, Eerikkälä, Hailila, Hanski, Hellä (Heligby), Hämeenkylä (Tavastby), Häppilä, Järvenkylä, Kattilainen, Kiiskilahti* (now Kiyskinlakhti), Kirkonkylä, Klamila, Koivuniemi, Koskela*, Koskelanjoki, Kotola, Kurkela, Laitsalmi*, Länsikylä (Flonckarböle), Martinsaari* (Now Island of Maly Pogranichny), Mattila, Mustamaa, Nopala, Orslahti* (now Primorskoye), Paatio* (Båtö in Swedish, now Bolshoy Pogranitshny), Pajulahti, Pajusaari*, Pitkäpaasi* (Island of Gorniya Kamenya), Pyterlahti, Ravijoki, Ravijärvi, Reinikkala, Rännänen (Grennäs), Sydänkylä (Kallfjärd), Säkäjärvi, Tiilikkala, Vaalimaa (Vaderma), Vilkkilä, Virojoki, Yläpihlaja, Yläurpala* (now Torfjanovka).

== Climate ==
Virolahti has a humid continental climate (Köppen: Dfb), with some moderation from the nearby Gulf of Finland.

Climate data for Virolahti Koivuniemi (1991–2020 normals, extremes 1977–present)
Month	Jan	Feb	Mar	Apr	May	Jun	Jul	Aug	Sep	Oct	Nov	Dec	Year
Record high °C (°F)	7.7 (45.9)	8.4 (47.1)	14.4 (57.9)	22.3 (72.1)	28.1 (82.6)	31.6 (88.9)	32.5 (90.5)	31.0 (87.8)	27.5 (81.5)	17.3 (63.1)	13.4 (56.1)	9.8 (49.6)	32.5 (90.5)
Mean daily maximum °C (°F)	−2.6 (27.3)	−2.8 (27.0)	1.2 (34.2)	7.6 (45.7)	14.8 (58.6)	19.0 (66.2)	22.0 (71.6)	20.7 (69.3)	15.3 (59.5)	8.4 (47.1)	3.2 (37.8)	−0.1 (31.8)	8.9 (48.0)
Daily mean °C (°F)	−5.3 (22.5)	−6.0 (21.2)	−2.6 (27.3)	3.0 (37.4)	9.3 (48.7)	14.2 (57.6)	17.2 (63.0)	15.7 (60.3)	10.9 (51.6)	5.4 (41.7)	1.0 (33.8)	−2.4 (27.7)	5.0 (41.0)
Mean daily minimum °C (°F)	−8.5 (16.7)	−9.5 (14.9)	−6.6 (20.1)	−1.2 (29.8)	3.4 (38.1)	8.7 (47.7)	11.8 (53.2)	10.4 (50.7)	6.4 (43.5)	2.1 (35.8)	−1.6 (29.1)	−5.1 (22.8)	0.9 (33.6)
Record low °C (°F)	−37.0 (−34.6)	−34.6 (−30.3)	−31.5 (−24.7)	−17.4 (0.7)	−7.3 (18.9)	−2.6 (27.3)	1.9 (35.4)	−0.5 (31.1)	−7.6 (18.3)	−16.4 (2.5)	−21.7 (−7.1)	−35.3 (−31.5)	−37.0 (−34.6)
Average precipitation mm (inches)	52 (2.0)	44 (1.7)	40 (1.6)	34 (1.3)	40 (1.6)	57 (2.2)	54 (2.1)	73 (2.9)	74 (2.9)	82 (3.2)	71 (2.8)	63 (2.5)	684 (26.9)
Average precipitation days	12	9	8	7	7	8	8	9	9	11	12	12	112
Source 1: https://helda.helsinki.fi/handle/10138/336063
Source 2: https://kilotavu.com/asema-taulukko.php?asema=101231

== Notable people born in Virolahti ==
- Uuno Klami, composer
- Johannes Takanen, sculptor
- Aarne Sihvo, general
- Veli Saarinen, cross-country skier, olympic gold medalist
- Väinö Liikkanen, cross-country skier, olympic silver medalist
- Lauri Törni soldier who fought under three flags.
