= Torfyanovka =

Border crossing point between Russia and Finland

Coordinates: 60°35′46″N 027°55′57″E

Torfyanovka is a border crossing point between Russia and Finland. It is located in Leningrad Oblast. With over 2 million annual crossings, it is the busiest border crossing on the Finnish-Russian border, which is also the border of the European Union and Russia. European route E18 passes through Torfyanovka.

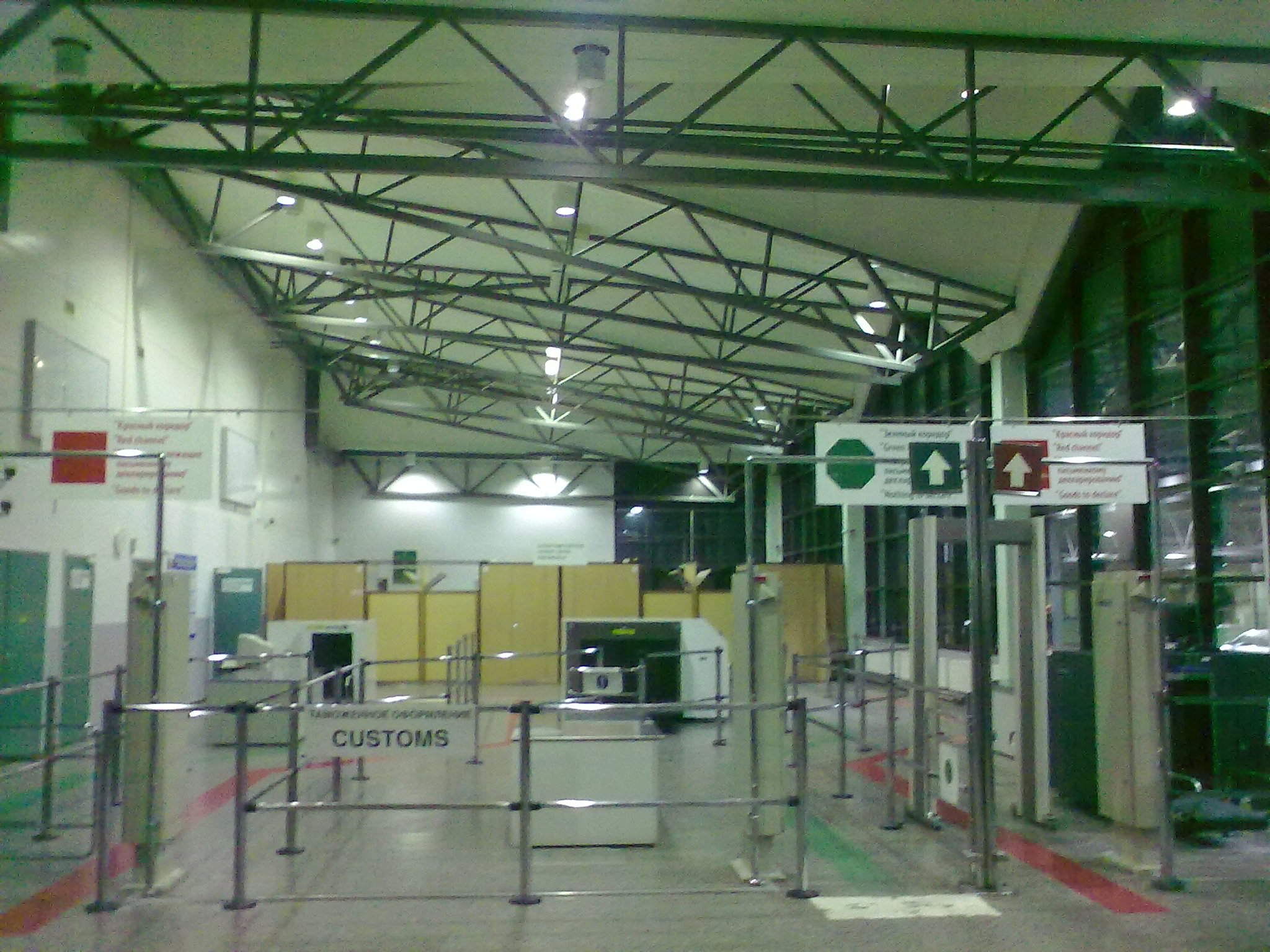
Customs terminal at Torfyanovka

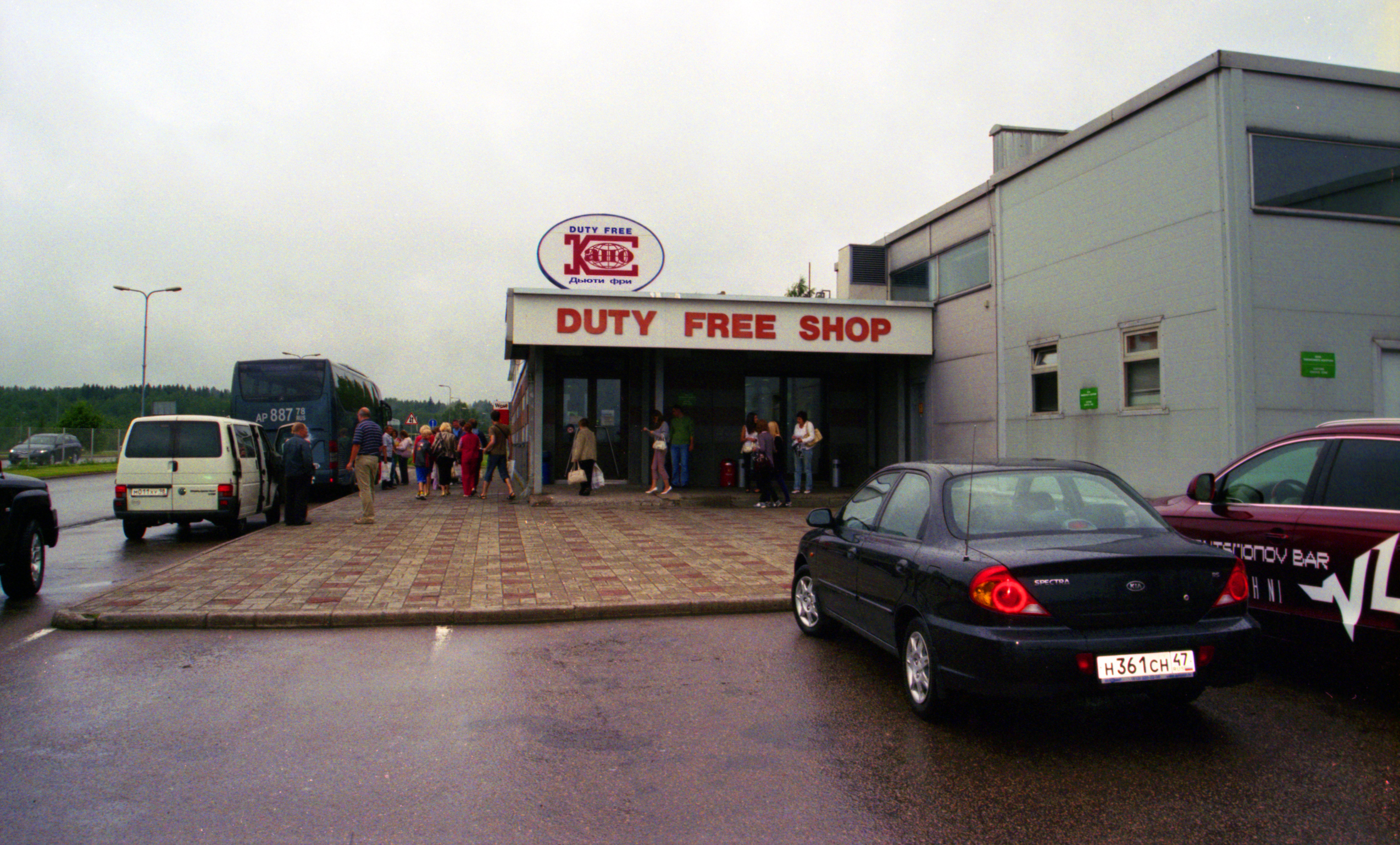
Duty-free shop in Torfyanovka

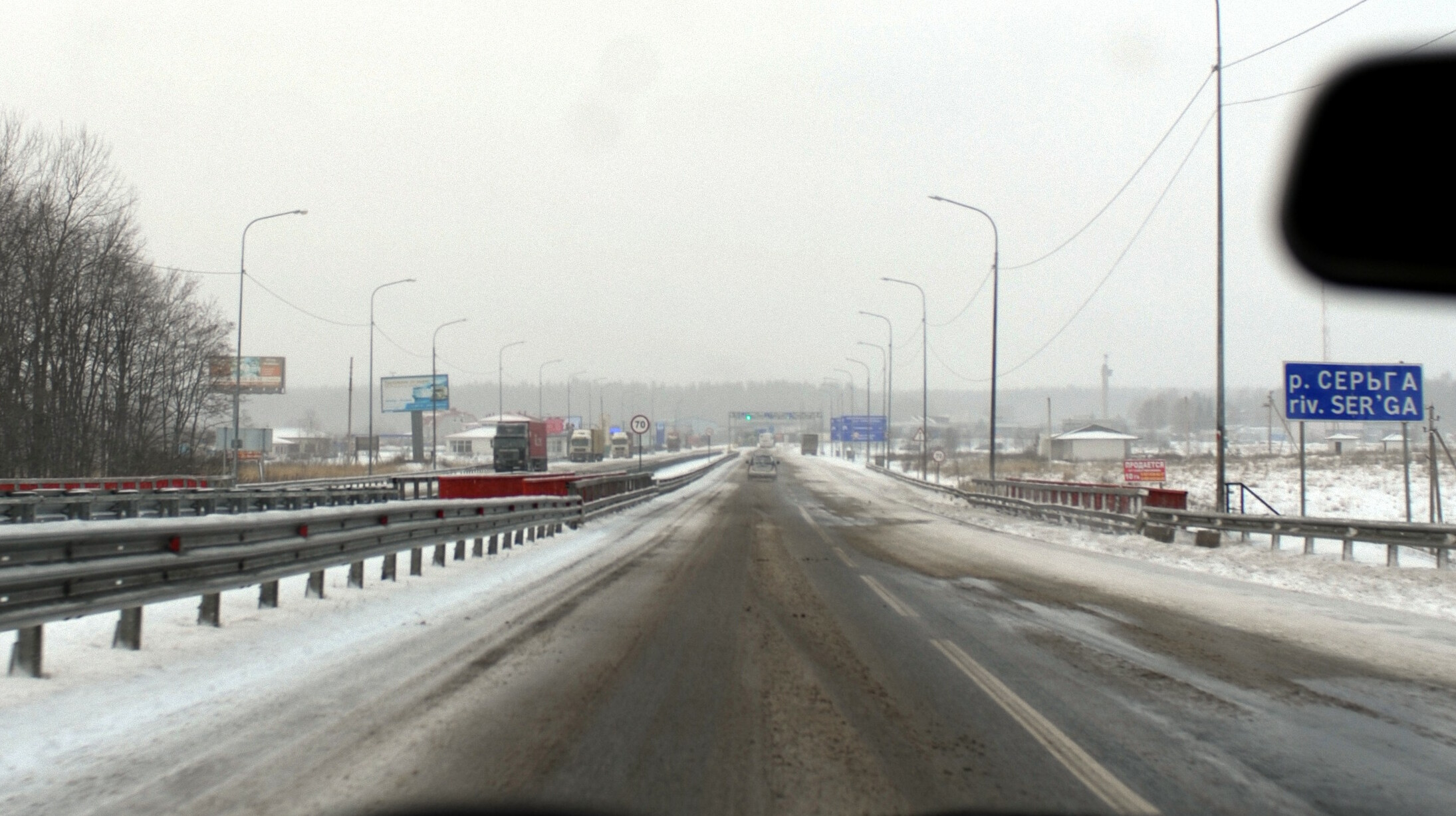
Torfyanovka highway to border crossing

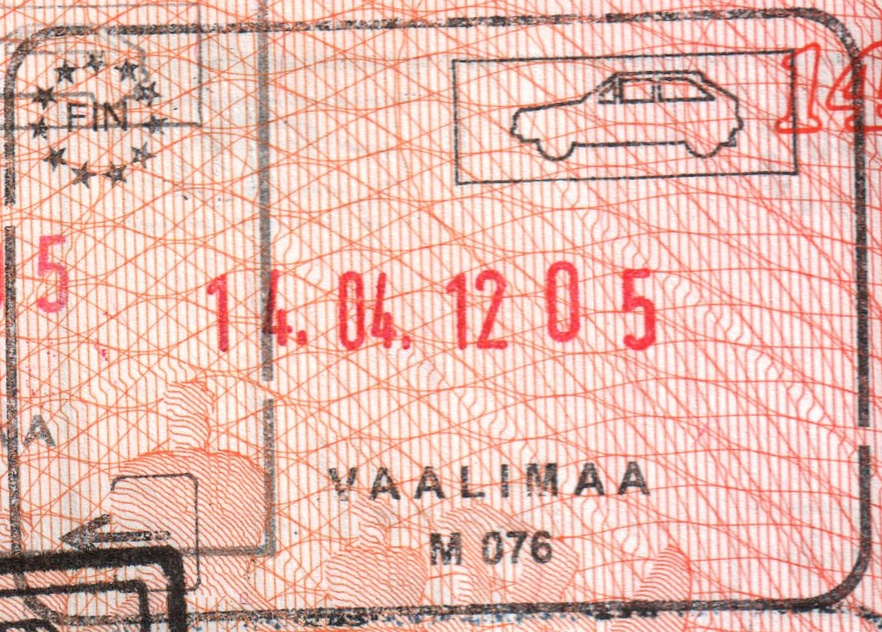
Passport stamp from the border checkpoint in Vaalimaa

== See also ==
- Vaalimaa, the border crossing point on the Finnish side of the border
