= Smaalenene Bridge =

Smaalenene Bridge Smålenene Bru
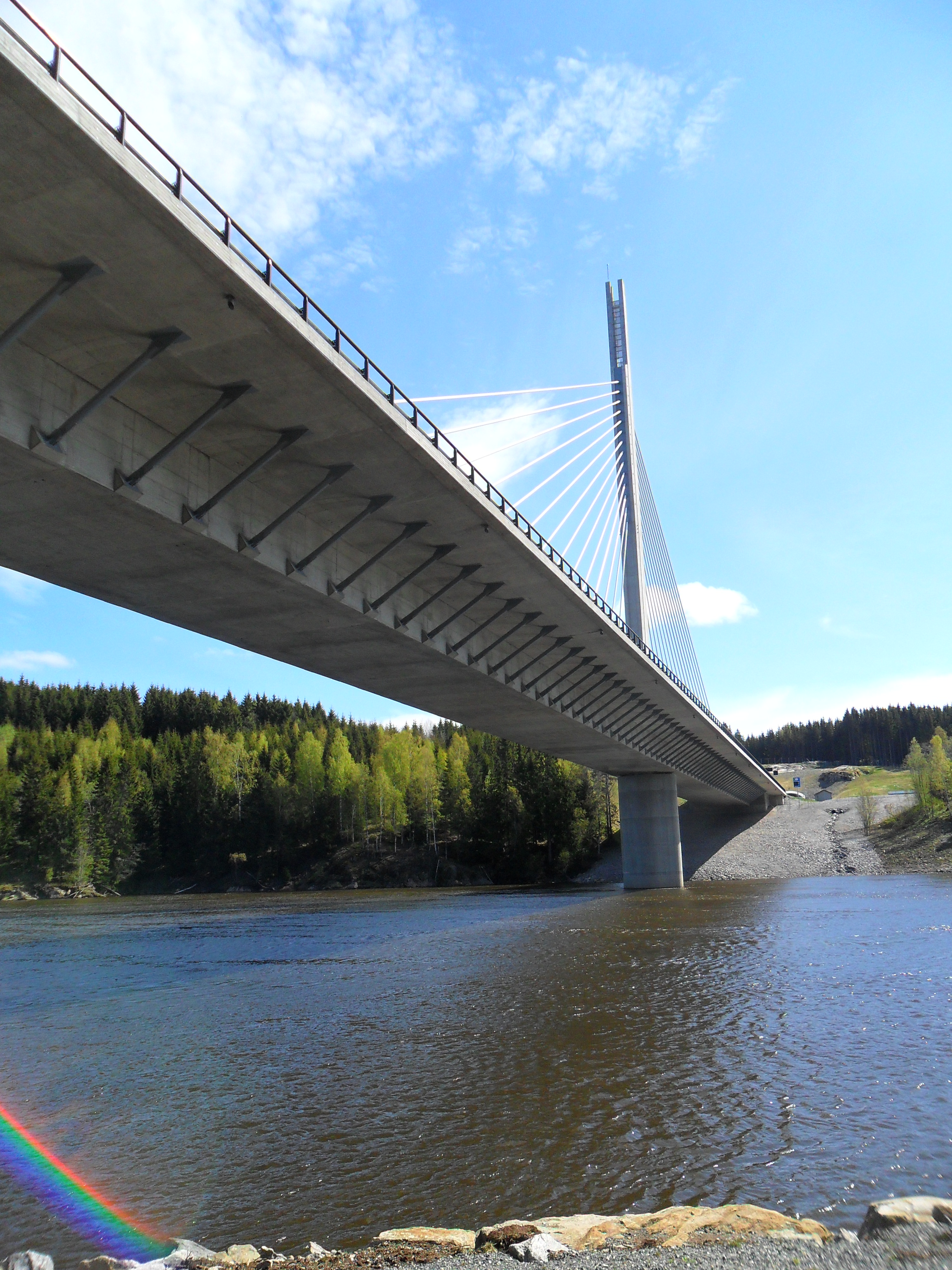
- Smaalenene bridge is a highway bridge in Indre Østfold, Østfold in Norway.
- Coordinates: 59°35′34″N 11°05′30″E
- Carries: 6 lanes, (2 lanes each way & 2 emergency lanes)
- Crosses: Glomma
- Locale: (Norway) Indre Østfold
- Official name: Smålenene Bru
- Maintained by: Norwegian Public Roads Administration

Characteristics
- Design: Cable-stayed bridge by Johs. Holt AS
- Total length: 315 meters (1,033 ft)
- Width: 25 meters (82 ft)
- Longest span: 185 meters (607 ft)

History
- Construction cost: NOK 180 million
- Opened: November 23, 2010

Statistics
- Daily traffic: Expected: 15,000 vehicles/day
- Toll: Cars: 25,00 NOK; Motorcycles: 0 NOK; Trucks: 50 NOK

Smaalenene bridge, and the new part of the highway between Oslo and Stockholm was opened November 23, 2010 by the Norwegian Prime Minister Jens Stoltenberg. The bridge is 315 meters long and crosses the longest river in Norway, Glomma. The main span is 185 meters and the tower is 88 meter high. The buildingprosess was started in 2007.

The bridge has a tower close 90 meters high and is founded on a 24 meter high column rising from the bottom of River Glomma. The German Bilfinger Berger has carried out the construction works on behalf of the Norwegian state road authorities. The bridge is a part of the larger new E18 motor way project, connecting Oslo and Stockholm.

The Smaalenene Bridge has become a new landmark for the region. The cable-stayed bridge is 315m long in total and spans the River Glomma as part of the new E18 link 80 km southeast of Oslo. It has a river clearance of 25m to the soffit of the deck and carries four lanes of traffic. The cable-stayed section consists of two spans with a single tower; the main span is 185m long and the back span has a length of 142.5m. A solid counterbalance abutment on the back span end was built to compensate the corresponding scope of works performed imbalance in dead load. A 45m-long approach span connects the cable-stayed part to the west abutment. The cable-stayed deck is supported by a single pylon via a central plane of 14 cables on each side of the tower. At deck level, the cables are anchored at 7m centers into a central beam that transfers the horizontal component of the stay’s force into the concrete deck through shear studs. The deck is 25m wide and is designed to carry two traffic lanes in each direction, separated by a 4.4mwide central reservation. Twenty-eight stay cables with individually galvanised, waxed and sheathed strands varying in size from 6-43 to 6-85 and in length from 40m to 126m. Forming the stay-cable bundle involved installing each individual strand one at a time and encapsulating them using an external HDPE pipe with double helical ribs.

== New E18 motor way project ==
E18 through Østfold is one of the main highways between Norway and Sweden. It is part of “the Nordic triangle” (Oslo – Stockholm – Copenhagen). Close to 25% of all goods transported between Norway and its surrounding countries are transported on the E18. The E18 also serves as an essential route for the transportation of goods and people to and from the inner part of Østfold. The national transport plan (2002–2011) which was presented in Parliamentary Announcement 46, (Stortingsmelding 46) (1999–2000) has accomplished certain goals and improved upon areas of community interest. At the very base, the hope is that there will not be any fatal accidents or serious injuries. This is also referred to as the “zero – vision.” In the parliamentary announcement it was shown that a narrow four-lane highway ought to be considered as a better alternative to the two-lane highway in the light of traffic safety. The construction of the new E18 through Østfold is a part of the Østfold-package, (Østfoldpakka) which is funded by toll plazas and the government. The Østfold-package was declared by the government on February 24, 2000, in the parliamentary proposition 26 (1999–2000)The primary goals for the Østfold-package are to ease the flow of traffic and create a safer E18 by laying the highway on the outskirts of densely populated areas.

=== Facts ===
The purpose of building a new E18 is to establish a new highway for transport vehicles and thru-traffic. It is a goal to secure better traffic safety, especially a reduction in the many serious collisions.

- Length: 29, 2 km. (financed thru the Østfold package)
- Contents: 54, 3 km. (E18 from Ørje to Vinterbro)
- Finance: Government and toll plazas
- Total cost: NOK 2, 2 billion. (The parcels financed through the Østfold-package. Parcels two, three, four and five)
