= Spydeberg =

Spydeberg Municipality Spydeberg kommune
- Former municipality
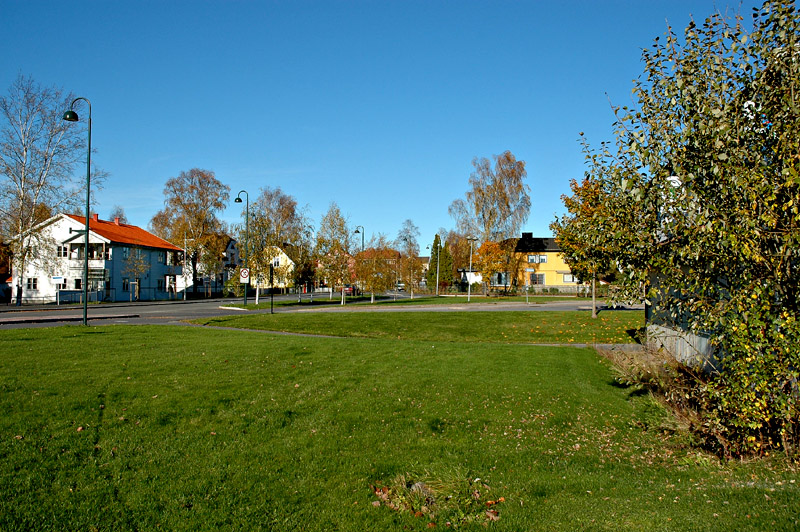

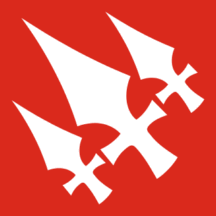
- Flag Coat of arms

- Østfold within Norway

- Spydeberg within Østfold
- Coordinates: 59°36′55″N 11°4′35″E
- Country: Norway
- County: Østfold
- Administrative centre: Spydeberg

Area (upon dissolution)
  - Total: 142 km^{2} (55 sq mi)
  - Land: 133 km^{2} (51 sq mi)
  - Rank: #362 in Norway

Population (2004)
  - Total: 5,186
  - Rank: #201 in Norway
  - Density: 35/km^{2} (91/sq mi)
  - Change (10 years): ▲ +9.7%
- Demonym: Speberging

Official language
  - Norwegian form: Bokmål
- Time zone: UTC+01:00 (CET)
  - Summer (DST): UTC+02:00 (CEST)
- ISO 3166 code: NO-0123
- Website: Official website

Spydeberg was a municipality in former Østfold county, Norway, until 31 December 2019. On 1 January 2020 it became a part of a new and larger municipality named Indre Østfold Kommune after the region, together with Askim, Trøgstad, Eidsberg and Hobøl kommuner (municipalities).

The administrative centre of the Spydeberg municipality was the village of Spydeberg. Spydeberg Kommune (municipality) was divided into the parishes of Spydeberg, Heli, and Hovin and was established as a municipality on 1 January 1838 (see formannskapsdistrikt).

The village of Spydeberg has approximately 5,500 inhabitants. It is located 45 kilometres (28 mi) southeast of Oslo and is easily reached by car, bus and train. At the most there used to be 16 daily buses to Oslo (the capital of Norway), and about 21 train departures. Like the rest of the Indre Østfold region, many of the citizens of Spydeberg commute daily to Oslo for work.

== General information ==
=== Name ===
The municipality (originally the parish) is named after the old Spydeberg farm (Old Norse: Spjótaberg), since the first church was built here. The first element is the plural genitive case of spjót which means 'spear' and the last element is berg which means 'mountain'. The word 'spear' is here probably referring to some outstanding points of a nearby mountain.

=== Coat-of-arms ===
The coat-of-arms is from modern times. They were granted on 30 June 1978. The arms show three canting silver spear points (from the word spyd which comes from the Old Norse word spjót) on a red background. The model for the spear points was unearthed at a burial mound near Mørk in 1905. The three spears represent the three parishes in the municipality. It was designed by Truls Nygaard.

Number of minorities (1st and 2nd generation) in Spydeberg by country of origin in 2017
Ancestry	Number
Poland	84
Lithuania	61
Syria	48
Eritrea	44
Myanmar	44
Sweden	36
Denmark	34

== Sister cities ==
The municipality of Spydeberg has been quite active in international relations for over 20 years. The town has sister cities in Denmark, Sweden, and Latvia.

- Thyholm, Midtjylland, Denmark
- Straupe, Pārgauja, Latvia
- Kungsör, Västmanland, Sweden
