= Vaalimaa =

Border crossing point in Virolahti, Finland

Coordinates: 60°36′00″N 027°48′30″E

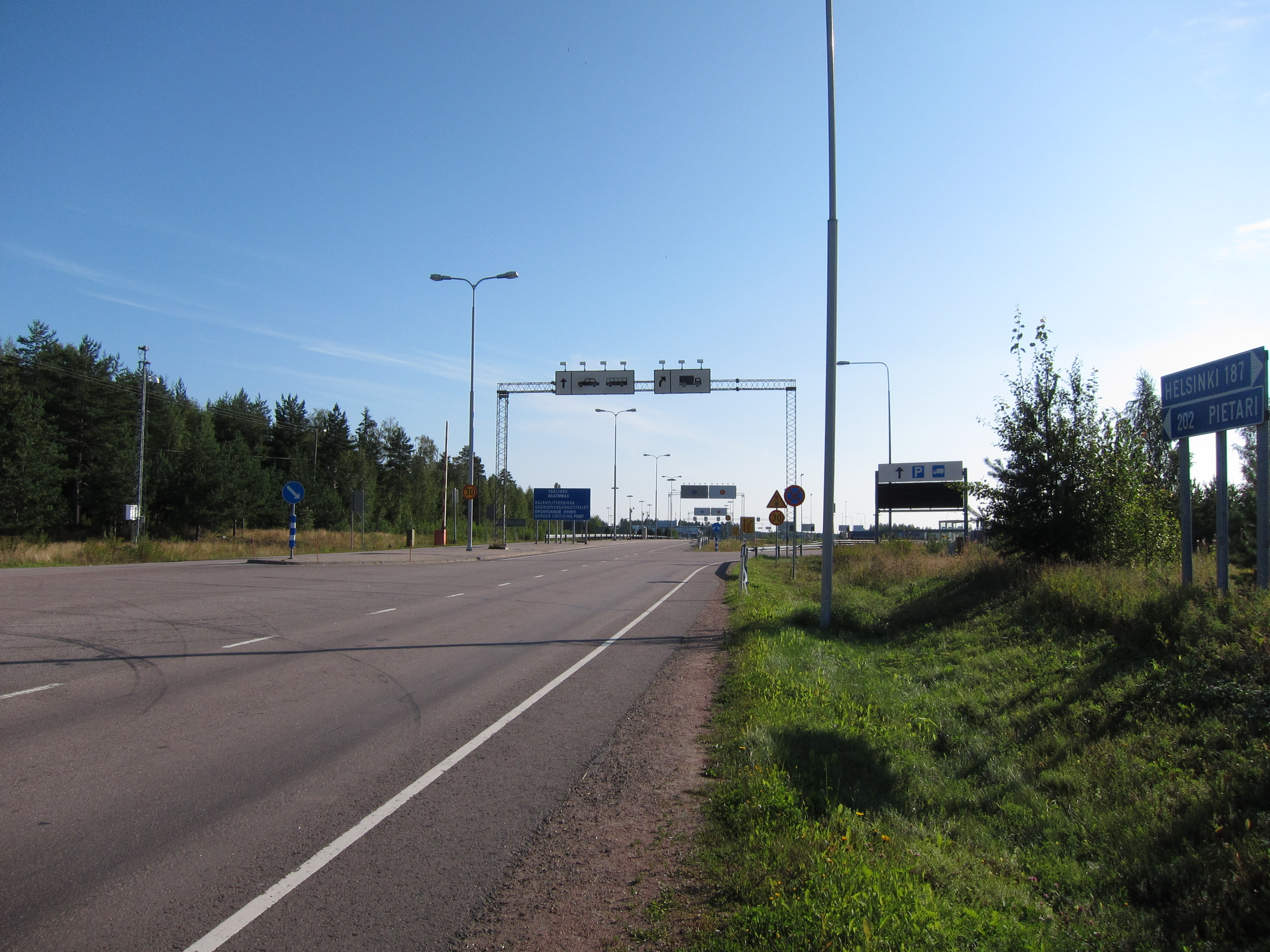
Vaalimaa border crossing point in Virolahti from Finland

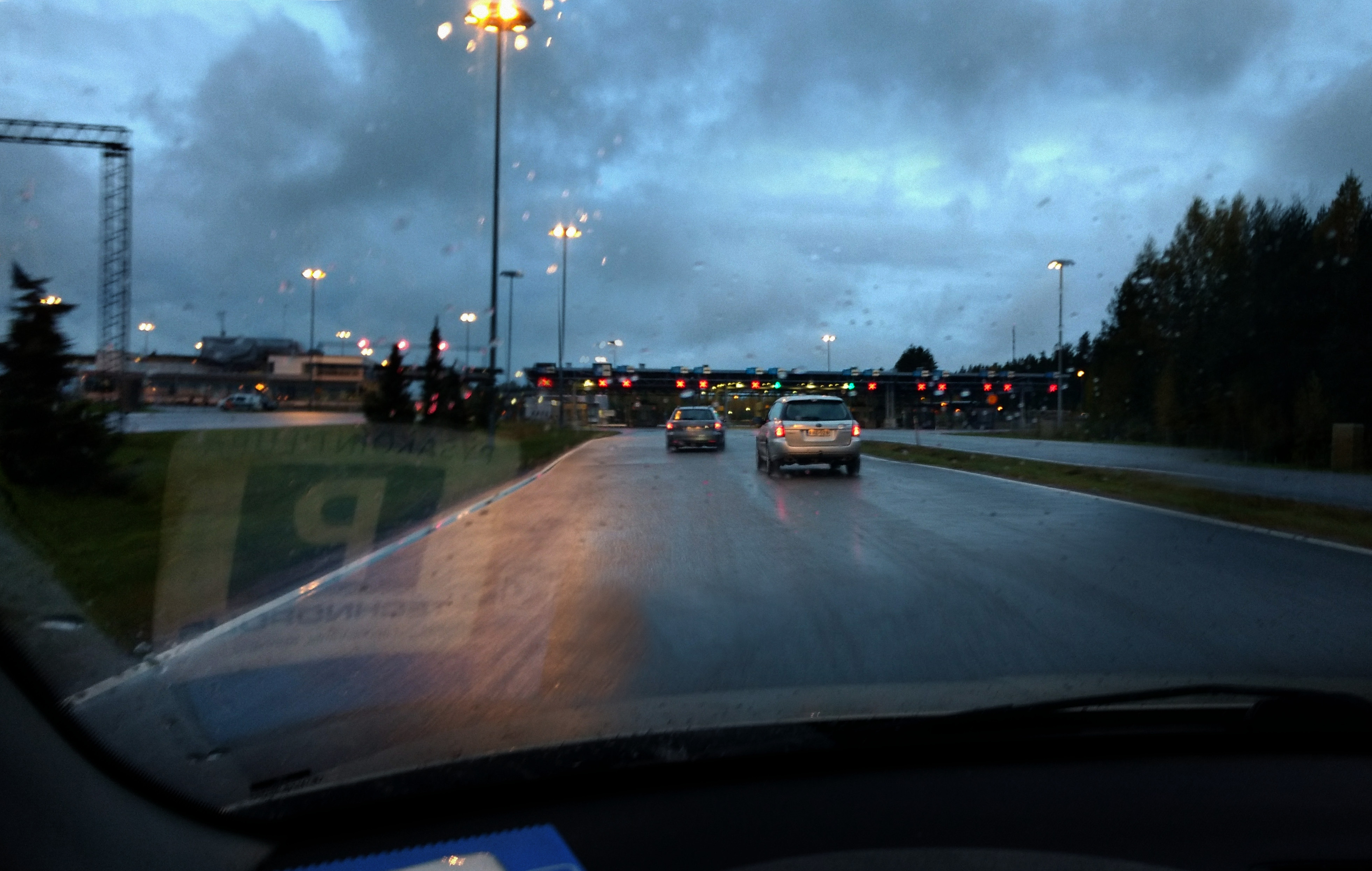
Vaalimaa border crossing point upon arrival from Russia

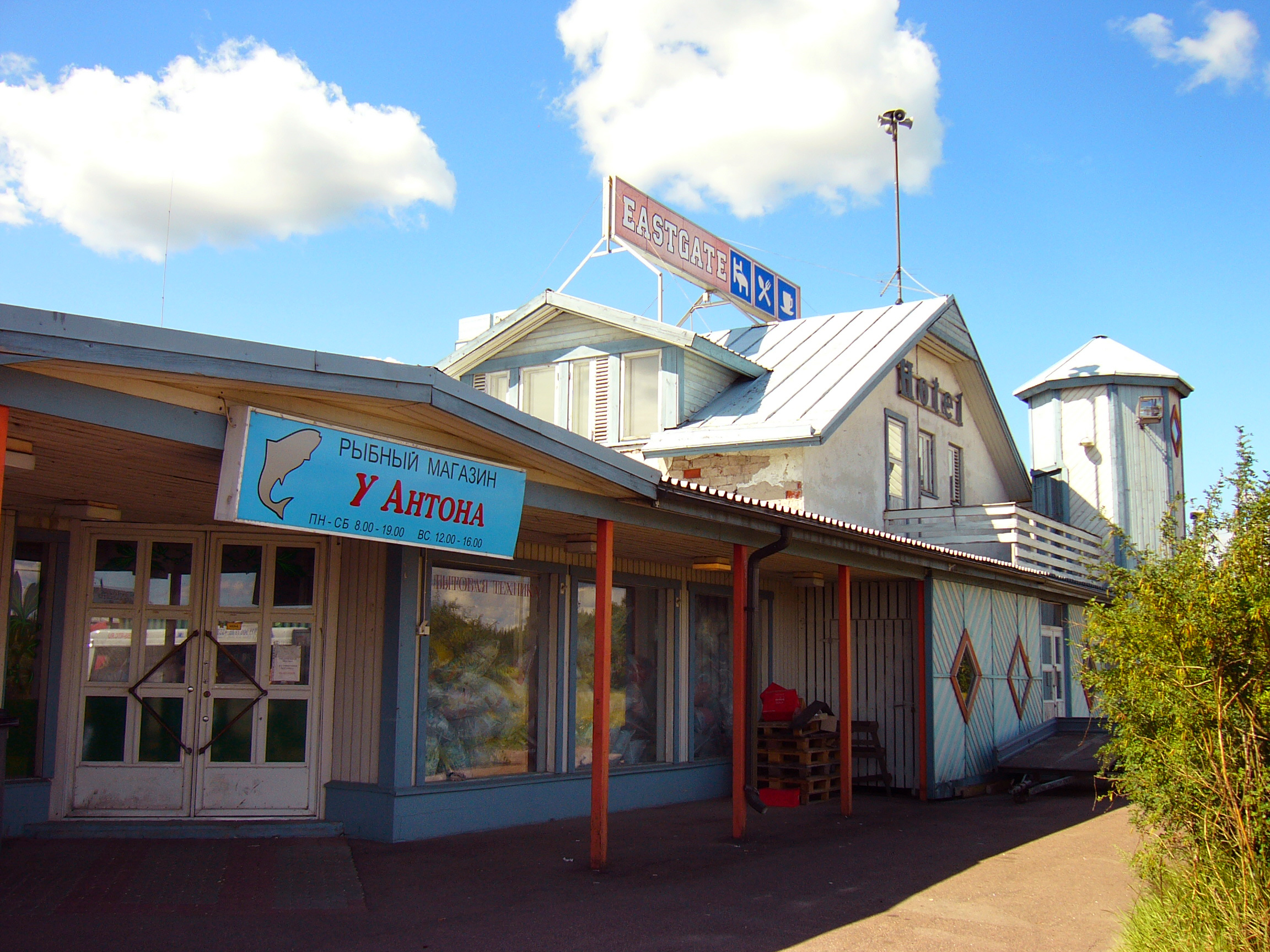
Shop and small hotel in Vaalimaa

Vaalimaa (Finnish pronunciation: [ˈʋɑːliˌmɑː]) is a village in the Virolahti municipality and a border crossing point between Finland and Russia. The border crossing station was opened in 1958 as a first road traffic crossing point between Finland and Soviet Union. With over 2 million annual crossings, it is the busiest border crossing in the Finnish-Russian border, and one of the busiest land border crossings of the European Union in general. European route E18 passes through Vaalimaa.

The border crossing is notorious for its long queues. Around Christmas 2007 there could even be a 50 to 60 kilometer line of trucks. The functioning of the border crossing is affected by the actions of the Russian Customs, Russian Border Control and some other Russian bureaus in Torfyanovka.

Trucks and passenger cars are handled in different lines. In 2004 it became possible to cross the border by bicycle. Pedestrian crossing is still forbidden.

The village contained numerous shops and malls catering to Russian visitors, but most have closed since the start of the Russo-Ukrainian war in 2022.

Distances from Vaalimaa

- Helsinki: 187 kilometres (116 mi)
- Kotka: 68 kilometres (42 mi)
- Saint Petersburg: 202 kilometres (126 mi)
- Vyborg: 55 kilometres (34 mi)
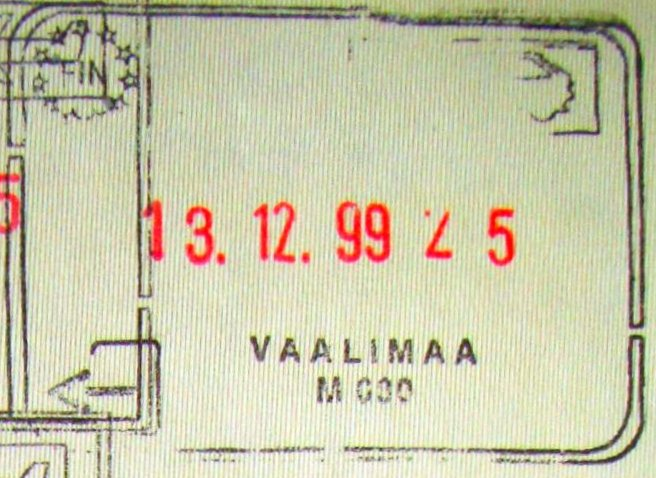
Old style passport stamp from the border checkpoint

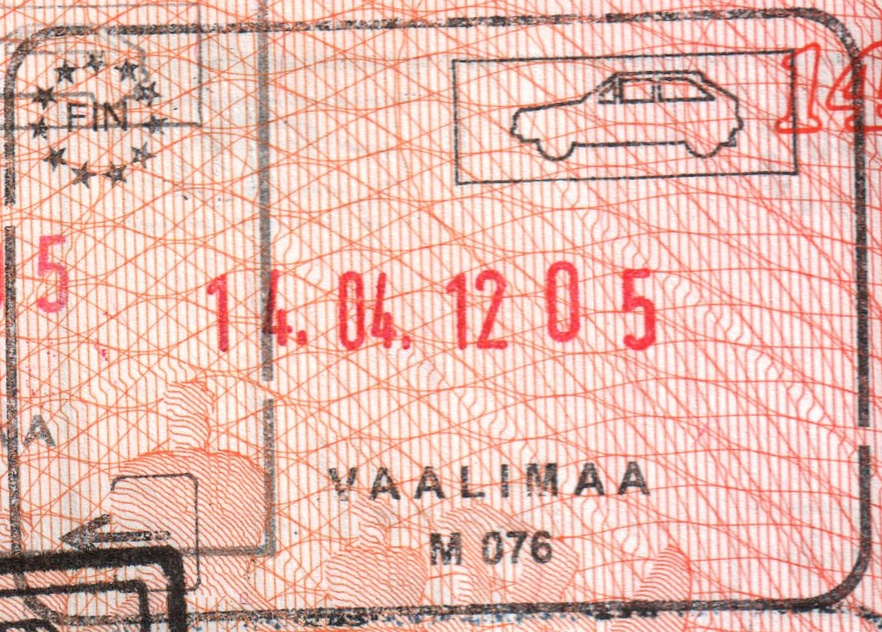
Passport stamp from the border checkpoint
