= Glava =

Norwegian manufacturer of glass wool

Glava AS is a Norwegian industrial company with headquarters in Askim. The name is a portmanteau of the Norwegian word glassvatt, meaning glass wool. Glass wool used as insulation material is the company's main product. Production takes place at the company's production facilities in Askim and Stjørdal. Glava employs around 500 people, and in 2007 had a revenue just short of NOK 1,500 million.

The company's history goes back to 1935, when industrialist Jens Bull was offered licensed production in Norway of glass wool, originally a German invention. The company was originally called "Glassvatt". During the post-war reconstruction of Norway, Glava grew dramatically, as the need for insulation of buildings became clear. The product is today made on a license from the French company Saint-Gobain. It is produced from borosilicate glass, which is heated to around 1,400 °C before being stretched into fibres.

In 1959, the company was responsible for the so-called "ice block expedition", later called "the world's greatest publicity stunt". The expedition consisted in bringing a three-ton block of ice from Mo i Rana by the Arctic Circle, to Libreville by the Equator, without using any form of refrigeration.
