= Fossum (surname) =

Fossum is a Norwegian surname. Notable people with the surname include:

- Casey Fossum (born 1978), American baseball player
- Eric Fossum (born 1957), American professor and inventor
- Iver Fossum (born 1996), Norwegian association footballer
- Jon Fossum (1923–2007), Norwegian politician for the Conservative Party
- Karin Fossum (born 1954), Norwegian author
- Marita Fossum (born 1965), Norwegian author
- Michael E. Fossum (born 1957), American astronaut
- Per Fossum (1910–2004), Norwegian alpine skier who competed in the 1936 Winter Olympics
- Sindre Fossum Beyer (born 1977), Norwegian politician for the Labour Party
- Theresa Welch Fossum, American veterinary surgeon
- Thor Fossum (1916–1993), Norwegian politician
- Tryggve Fossum, Norwegian computer architect
