= Askim Upper Secondary School =

Coordinates: 59°34′33.85″N 11°9′46.84″E

- Askim, Østfold; Norway

Information
- Type: Public
- Motto: Et kraftsenter for kunnskap & læringsglede
- Principal: Vigdis Gjerberg
- Enrollment: ~1200
- Campus: Suburban
- Branches of study: Multiple, see website for further information
- Website: Askim VGS

Askim Upper Secondary School (Norwegian: Askim Videregående Skole) is an Upper Secondary School situated in the outskirts of the municipality of Askim. It was originally two different schools; Hov Upper Secondary School (general studies) and Ask Upper secondary School (vocational training), but they merged to Askim Upper Secondary School for practical reasons. It is a public school, both run and owned by the county of Viken.

The school is most known nationally, and to a small extent internationally, for its many successful 'youth enterprises'. The youth enterprise is a part of one of the schools many branches of study. The second grade students of this branch create their own small-time company and try to survive in the market selling a service or a product they have created.

The school is also an 'Environmental Lighthouse', meaning it makes an effort in sorting garbage, reducing the amount of waste resources and reducing the schools energy consumption.

== Location and structures ==
The school is situated near a small forest, Hovskogen, and the city centre lies within easy walking distance. A mostly suburban landscape dominates the surrounding area, although both rural and urban landscapes are in the vicinity.

The school has seven primary structures named by letters of the alphabet, A, B, C etc. The different structures house different branches of study.

- The A-building is home to the 'Health and social' students
- The B-building is home to the 'Mechanics and industrial' students
- The C-building is home to the second grade Electricians and Carpenters.
- The D-building is home to both first grade Electricians, Carpenters, Mechanics and more. An outdated computerpark is also present in this building.
- The E-building is home to the Theoretical students. The teacher offices lie in the basement.
- The F-building is the Gym.
- The G-building is home to the administration. It's considered the main building. This is where the cafeteria is. Lessons in Physics, Chemistry and Biology are held here.
- The H-building is home to the school nurse and advisors.

== Administration and employees ==
The school has some 160 employees, including everything from teachers and librarians, to cleaners and janitors.

== Library ==
The school houses a library with multiple encyclopedias and books. Fresh newspapers and magazines, both local and international, are also made available to the students.

The school library has twelve thin clients as well as ten laptops the students can use at any time.
