= Ice block expedition of 1959 =

1959 Norwegian publicity stunt

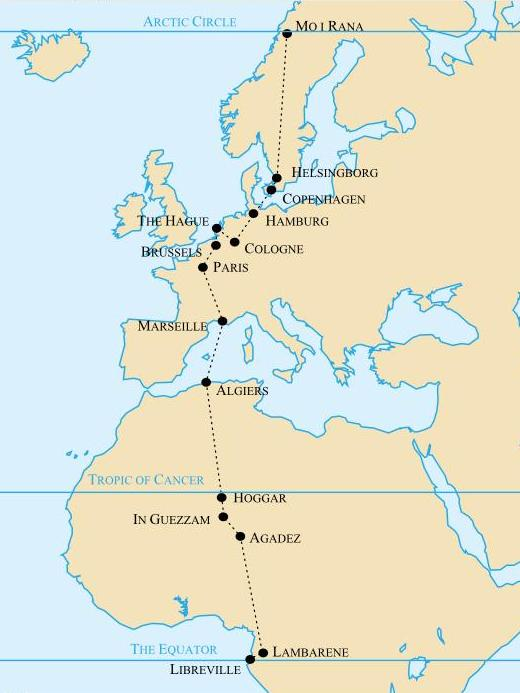
Route taken by the ice block expedition

The ice block expedition of 1959 (Norwegian: isblokkekspedisjonen) was a publicity stunt carried out by the Norwegian insulation material producer Glassvatt. Responding to a challenge from the radio station Radio Luxembourg, Glassvatt decided to equip a truck to bring a three-ton block of ice from Mo i Rana by the Arctic Circle, to Libreville by the Equator. There was no form of refrigeration applied, and the expedition was intended to display the efficiency of the insulating glass wool used. The truck also brought 300 kg of medicines to the hospital of Albert Schweitzer in Lambaréné.

The expedition then was followed by a worldwide press corps, and crowds of spectators gathered in various European cities along the route. Crossing the Sahara, where the truck repeatedly got stuck in the sand, proved both a dangerous and laborious task. Once the truck had made it through the desert, however, and reached its final destination, it was revealed that the ice block had lost only about 11% of its original weight. When the expedition reached its goal it generated much media attention for the company. It was called "the world's greatest publicity stunt". To mark the 50th anniversary of the event in 2009, the company made the original documentary of the expedition available online. They also released a new interview with the expedition's leader Sivert Klevan, who was 84 years old at the time of the interview.

== Background and preparations ==
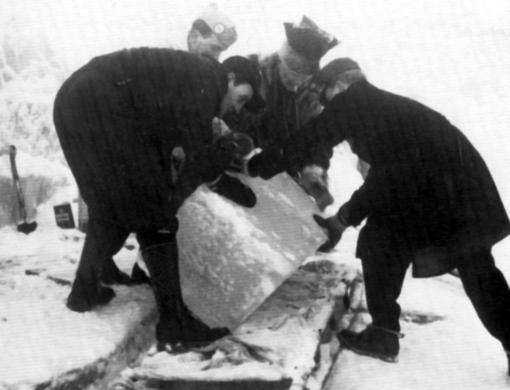
Landowner Anton Svartisdal assists with extraction of the ice from the Svartisen glacier.

In the autumn of 1958, Radio Luxembourg launched a challenge to transport three tons of ice from the Arctic Circle to the Equator. The radio station would award 100,000 francs for each kilogram (at the time, US$202.55 per kilogram; $2242 or €2002 per kg in 2025 currency) that remained at the destination; the only condition was that no form of refrigeration should be used. Managing director Birger Natvik at the Norwegian insulation material company Glassvatt (today Glava AS) saw the announcement and suggested that the company take on the challenge. He estimated that by isolating the ice with glass wool ("glassvatt" in Norwegian) made from glass fibre, the driver could make several million francs. Once Radio Luxembourg realised the potential loss, they retracted the offer. By this point, however, the planned expedition had received so much attention that Glassvatt decided to go through with it anyway. Among the other sponsors were Shell, who provided the fuel, and Scania, who provided the truck. Altogether, sponsors from eight countries financed the expedition, including Glassvatt's French mother company, the Saint-Gobain corporation. The French sponsors wanted a French truck to be used, but the Norwegians insisted on a Scandinavian one. The latter position won through, and a Scania-Vabis was selected for the task. The expedition's leader later admitted that a French truck probably would have been more suitable for driving in the desert. On 22 February 1959, at 9:15 am, the expedition left Mo i Rana.

Responsibility for the expedition was given to Sivert Klevan, an engineer with a good instinct for public relations. The ice was to be procured from the glacier Svartisen, and a glaciologist was brought along to give advice. It soon became clear that the entire three-ton block could not be brought out in one go. Instead, 200 kg blocks were cut out with a chainsaw, carried away on a sled, and flown by helicopter down to the town centre. There they were melted together to make a block of ice weighing 3,050 kg. The block was placed in a specially constructed iron container, which was insulated with wood and glass wool. The container was placed on top of a truck that would carry it all the way to the Equator, accompanied by a van carrying equipment and a sedan with a film crew.

== Through Europe ==
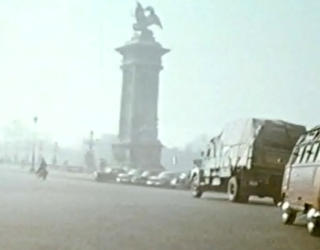
The expedition arrives in Paris, and receives police escort through the city.

The first stop for the expedition was Oslo. There it was greeted by a great ceremony at Studenterlunden in front of the University. The truck was loaded with 300 kilograms (660 lb) of medicines, to the value of 50,000 Norwegian krone. These medicines were to be delivered to the hospital of humanitarian Albert Schweitzer in Lambaréné, near the final destination of Libreville, the capital of Gabon. From Oslo the expedition continued to Helsingborg in Sweden and Copenhagen in Denmark, where more medicines were brought along. For public relations purposes the expedition made its way through several European cities – including Hamburg, Cologne, The Hague and Brussels – and was received with ceremony and much attention everywhere. In Belgium a problem arose over a missing customs declaration for the ice, but this was solved when a customs official agreed to accompany the cars through the country. Klevan later received a personal apology for this inconvenience, conveyed by the Norwegian foreign minister Halvard Lange from Lange's Belgian colleague and personal friend.

In Paris the expedition was escorted by police through the streets, and the crew members were invited to dine with the mayor. From Paris the truck continued to Marseille. There it was lifted aboard the freighter "Sidi Mabrouk", that sailed the cargo to Algiers. In Algiers a special crane had to be obtained to lift the truck – weighing a total of sixteen tons, including the ice – onto the shore. The container was drained at this point to see how much of the ice had melted. In spite of unusually hot European weather for the season, only four litres (0.88 imp gal; 1.1 US gal) of water had been shed.

== Crossing the Sahara ==
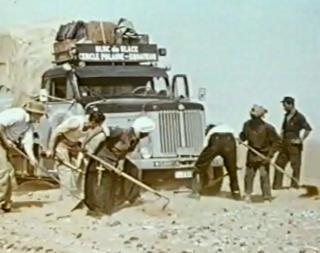
The truck gets stuck in the Sahara sand, and has to be dug out.

Crossing the Sahara was considered particularly perilous at the time because of guerilla forces hiding in the mountains during the Algerian War of Independence. The medicines carried by the truck would have been valuable loot for these groups, and for the first part of the desert the expedition was accompanied by the French Foreign Legion. The instruction the men received was "No stops, drive for your lives, even if you get a flat tire." The crossing passed without violent incidents, however, and greater problems were presented by the elements. There were no roads in the desert, and the truck was heavily loaded and not especially adapted to the conditions. Several times it got stuck in the desert sand; the crew had to place steel plates underneath for traction and spend hours digging out the sand from under the wheels. This took a great toll on the men, who had a limited supply of water, in temperatures approaching 50 °C. The crew spent most nights in oases along the way, but on occasion also slept in sleeping bags in the sand.

At one point the expedition met a tribe of Tuaregs and greeted them by offering their camels water from the container. According to the commentary in the documentary film, the camels had never tasted anything as delicious as the Norwegian glacier water. This was not entirely true; the water was contaminated by the glass wool and tar paper, and it was barely drinkable. The expedition arrived at the Hoggar Mountains near the Tropic of Cancer after fourteen days of travelling. A measurement at that point showed a loss of 96 litres of water. Once the Sahara was traversed, after 7,500 km (4,660 mi) of driving, 177 litres had melted away. On average 15 litres melted each day in the desert.

== Arrival and aftermath ==
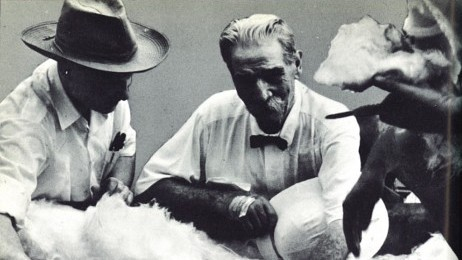
The expedition meets with Albert Schweitzer, and delivers the medicine.

After approximately three weeks, the expedition arrived in Lambaréné and met with Albert Schweitzer. Klevan later described the meeting with Schweitzer as the greatest moment of the entire expedition. Later, the hospital received 500 kg of Norwegian klippfisk (dried and salted cod), a particular favourite with the hospital's patients. The medicines were handed over, and the container was opened. Even though the drainage had been monitored throughout the expedition, there was still great excitement associated with seeing the result firsthand. The block of ice turned out to be almost entirely intact.

The expedition arrived at its final destination of Libreville on 21 March, after twenty-seven days. The block of ice was found to weigh 2,714 kg; it had lost only 336 kg along the way. Though it was unclear how much time the expedition would take, Klevan had initially estimated a loss of 10%; the result was approximately 11%. A French representative of the company met the crew in Libreville. A personal friend of President Charles de Gaulle, he presented an offer to drive the ice back to Paris. If the crew accepted, the President himself would have received the crew under the Arc de Triomphe. The men, however, were too exhausted at that point to contemplate such an offer. Instead, arrangement were made for the vehicles to be brought back by freight, while the crew would fly home. The ice was cut up and divided between the citizens of Libreville, for whom this was a rare commodity. Klevan, always conscious of promotional opportunities, brought a portion of the ice back home with him. This ice was subsequently used in drinks served to journalists at the première of the expedition documentary back home in Oslo.

The expedition had been an enormous success, both in accomplishing the goal it had set out to accomplish, and by generating worldwide press coverage for the company and its product. The venture was reported on as far away as India. In 1979, Oslo Marketing Association commemorated the ice block expedition with a special event titled "The world's greatest publicity stunt". To commemorate the 50th anniversary of the event in 2009, Glava AS made the original documentary of the expedition available online. They also released a newly recorded interview with Sivert Klevan, who by that time was 84 years old.
