= Vamma Hydroelectric Power Station =

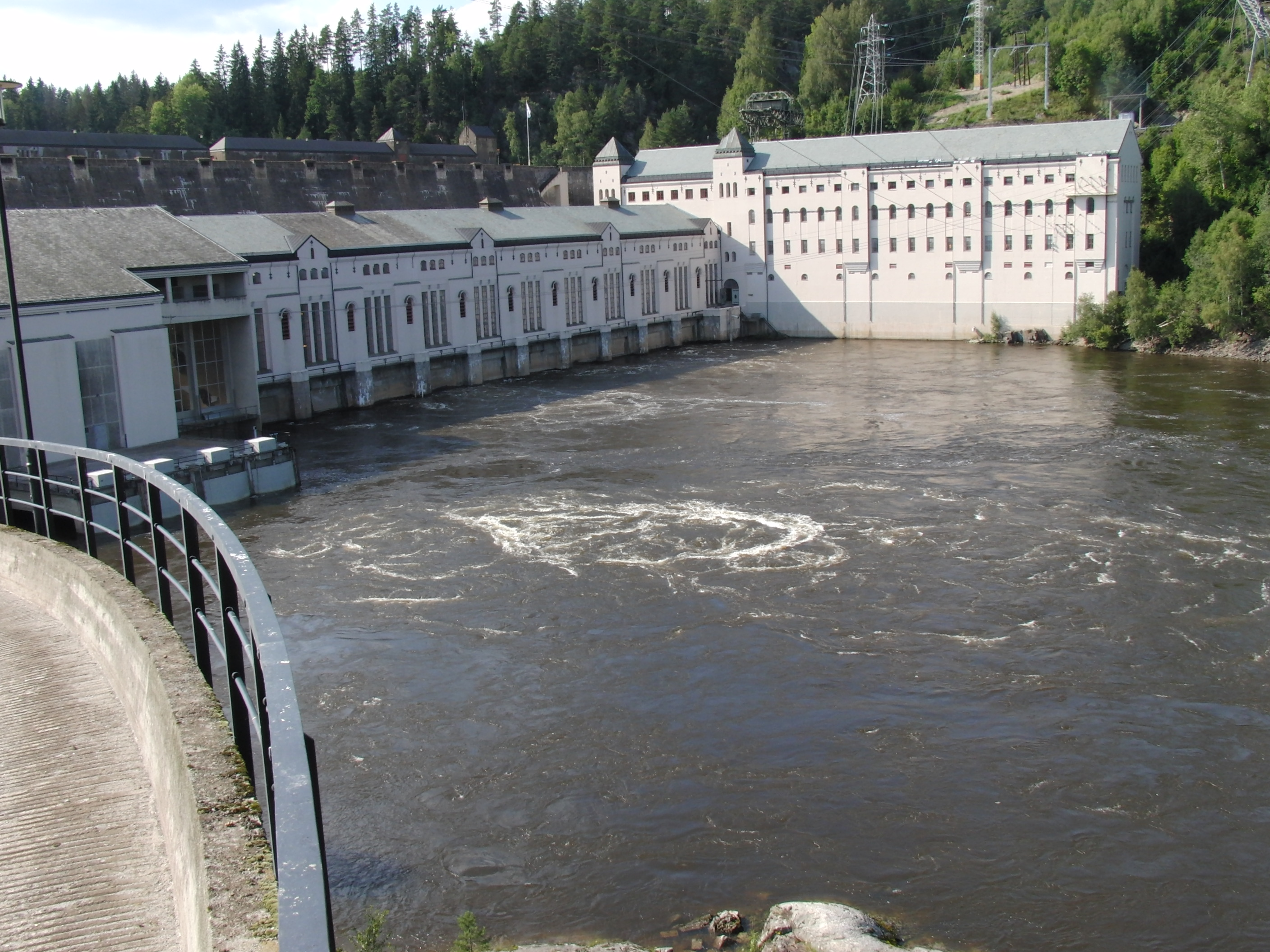
- Vamma kraftstasjon
- Official name: Vamma kraftverk
- Country: Norway
- Location: Østfold
- Coordinates: 59°32′29″N 11°10′12″E
- Construction began: 1907
- Opening date: 1915; 110 years ago
- Owner(s): Hafslund E-CO
- Operator(s): Hafslund E-CO Vannkraft

Power Station
- Hydraulic head: 28.5 m
- Turbines: 12
- Installed capacity: 344 MW
- Capacity factor: 69.7%
- Annual generation: 1,506.8

Vamma Power Station (Vamma kraftstasjon) is a hydroelectric power station located on the river Glomma approximately 4.5 km south of Askim, Østfold, Norway.
Sam Eyde formed Vamma Fossekompagnie in 1902 to build a power plant for a fertilizer factory. The factory plans were canceled in 1912 and Vamma Fossekompagnie was sold to Hafslund (company).
Construction of the power station started in 1907 and in 1915 the first two turbines were completed. Another six turbines were built between 1915 and 1927. In 1944 the final two were complete. The installed capacity at that point was 113 MW from ten horizontal Francis turbines with dual runners.

Between 1967 and 1971 a Kaplan turbine was built, adding another 110 MW, and it now operates at an installed capacity of 215 MW, with an average annual production of 1,275 GWh.

In 2015 the construction of a twelfth turbine began on the south side of the dam. This is also a Kaplan turbine rated at 128 MW. The new turbine will allow the ten old turbines to only be used during the spring flood season, giving the plant more flexibility. The turbine is expected to add another 230GWh to the annual production.
Testing of the turbine began on 16 May 2019., and was officially opened on September 8, 2019, by prime minister Erna Solberg.
With the new turbine in operation it will be the largest run-of-the-river hydroelectric plant in Norway.
