= Askim =

Town in Østfold, Norway

Askim Municipality Askim kommune
- Municipality
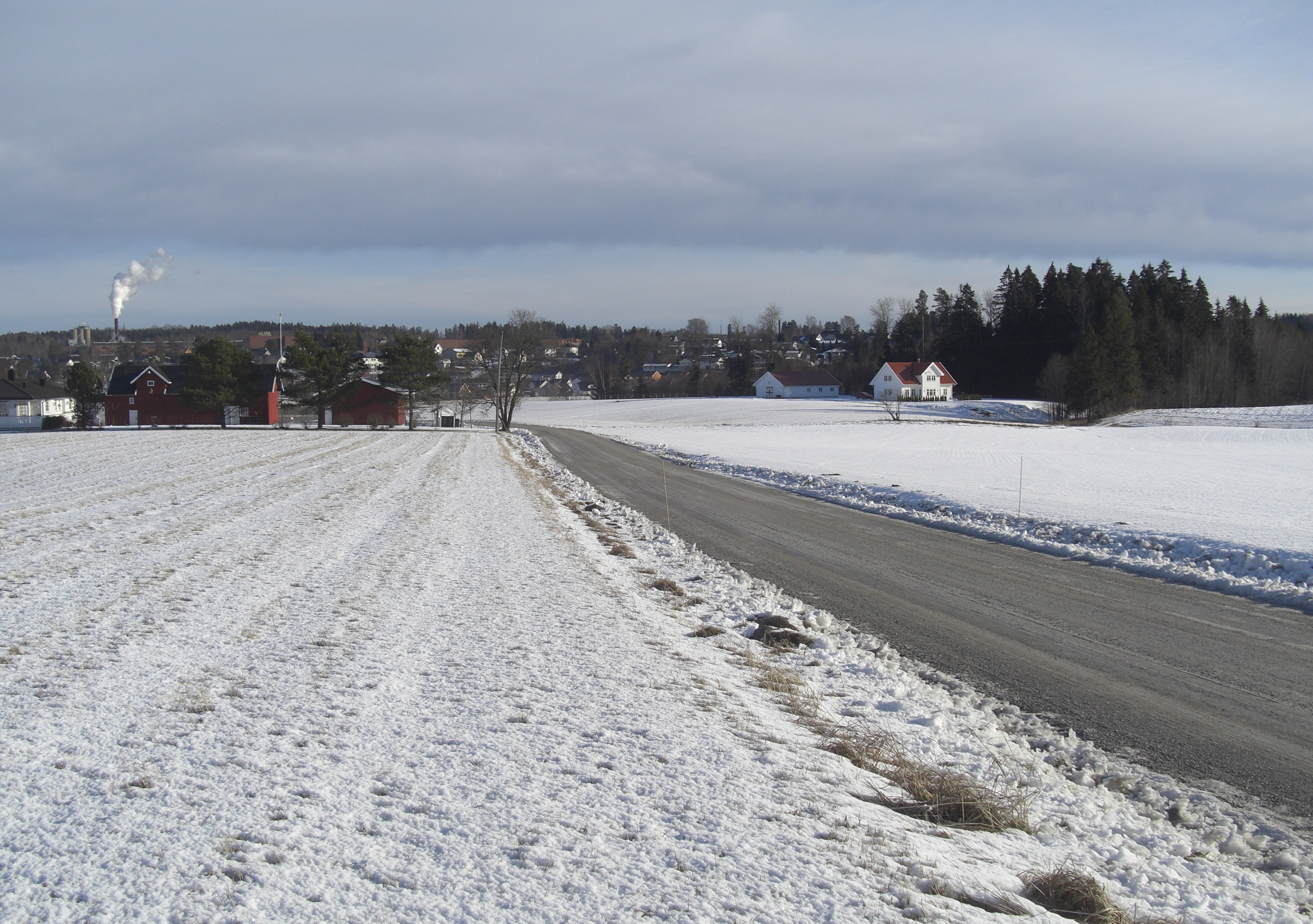
- Askim, Skjoldenveien

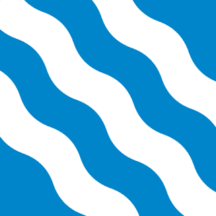
- Flag Coat of arms

- Østfold within Norway

- Askim within Østfold
- Coordinates: 59°35′10″N 11°10′12″E
- Country: Norway
- County: Østfold
- District: Smaalenene
- Administrative centre: Askim

Government
  - Mayor (2011): Thor Hals (H)

Area
  - Total: 69 km^{2} (27 sq mi)
  - Land: 66 km^{2} (25 sq mi)
  - Rank: #409 in Norway

Population (30. June 2014)
  - Total: 15,511
  - Rank: #71 in Norway
  - Density: 225/km^{2} (580/sq mi)
  - Change (10 years): ▲ +9%
- Demonym: Askiming

Official language
  - Norwegian form: Bokmål
- Time zone: UTC+01:00 (CET)
  - Summer (DST): UTC+02:00 (CEST)
- ISO 3166 code: NO-0124
- Website: Official website

Askim is a town and a former municipality in (from January 1, 2020) Indre Østfold municipality in the county of Østfold, Norway.

The administrative centre of the Askim municipality was the town of Askim. Askim was established as a municipality on 1 January 1838 (see formannskapsdistrikt).

Askim is the largest population centre in the Indre Østfold region, with 15,315 inhabitants as of 2012, and serves as a regional center for nine municipalities in the Indre Østfold region. It lies next to the longest river in Norway, Glomma, which forms the border with the former Spydeberg municipality to the north and west, and Skiptvet municipality to the south. Askim also borders to the former Trøgstad municipality to the northeast and the former Eidsberg municipality to the southeast.

Askim produces large amounts of hydroelectricity at three dams / hydroelectric power plants in the river Glomma. From upstream to downstream: Solbergfoss, Kykkelsrud, then Vamma.

There was nickel mining at Kykkelsrud at the turn of the 20th century. These mines are also one of the few places where "Spheroidal Norite" ("Potato Stone") is found.

Askim has been an industrial city for most of the 20th century. The main employer, Viking Gummi (producing rubber products like boots and tyres etc.), shut down their rubber product production in 1991 after being taken over by the Continental Tyres owned Swedish Gislaved Tyres.

Glava was the main employer by the 2010s, making glass cotton insulation etc.

== History ==
Askim has always been a strategic point in wars due to its relative easy crossing of the river. The last battle between Norway and Sweden was fought at the crossing over Glomma on 9 August 1814. There is a yearly historical reenactment, as well as a stone monument at Langnes to commemorate this event.

During the Norwegian campaign of World War II, a battle occurred at Fossum Bridge when the Norwegian Army defended the crossing against invading Germans in April 1940.

=== Name ===
The municipality (originally the parish) is named after the old Askim farm (Old Norse: Askheimr), since the first church was built here. The first element is askr which means "ash tree" and the last element is heimr which means "home", "homestead", or "farm".

=== Coat-of-arms ===
The coat-of-arms is from modern times. They were granted on 1 November 1963. The arms symbolize the three large waterfalls in the municipality, the Solbergfoss, Kykkelsrudfoss, and Vammafoss. The rivers and waterfalls are also partially harnessed for hydroelectric power.

== Transportation ==
European route E18 used to go through the city centre, however, since the upgrade to four-lane highway in 2005, its route now runs outside the centre. Vy's Eastern Østfold Line serves the municipality with stops at Langnes Station and Næringsparken and Askim Station in between.

== Government ==
The municipal council runs the government of Askim. The 2007 election results are as follows:

Number of minorities (1st and 2nd generation) in Askim by country of origin in 2015
Ancestry	Number
Poland	399
Iraq	312
Vietnam	288
Bosnia-Herzegovina	163
Philippines	140
Somalia	131
Kosovo	126
Lithuania	123
Syria	118
Croatia	113

== Attractions ==
- Østfoldbadet (in Norwegian)
- Askim videregående skole
- Askimtorget (in Norwegian)
- Askim Golf Course

== Twin towns ==
The following cities are twinned with Askim:

- - Huddinge, Stockholm County, Sweden
- - Lyngby-Taarbæk Kommune, Region Hovedstaden, Denmark
- - Nuuk, Nuuk Municipality, Greenland
- - Rapla, Rapla County, Estonia
- - Seyðisfjörður, Seyðisfjarðarkaupstaður, Iceland
- - Vantaa, Uusimaa, Finland
