= Olai Pedersen Wiig =

Norwegian politician

Olai Petersen Wiig
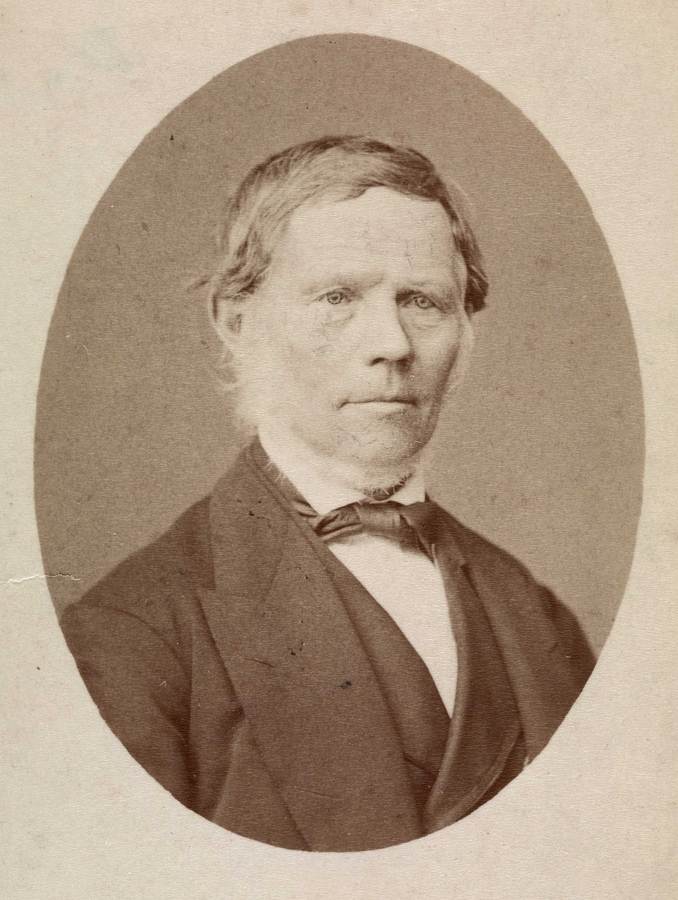

Member of the Storting from Østfold
- In office 1845–1847
- In office 1851–1870
- In office 1874–1879

Deputy Member of the Storting from Østfold
- In office 1848–1850
- In office 1871–1873

Mayor of Trøgstad, Norway
- In office 1844–1847
- Succeeded by: Zyprian Svendsen Sødtland

Personal details
- Born: 10 October 1802 Trøgstad, Norway
- Died: 29 September 1887 (aged 84) Trøgstad, Norway

Olai Pedersen Wiig (10 October 1802 – 29 September 1887) was a Norwegian politician who served as the mayor of Trøgstad between 1844 and 1847. Wiig served in the Storting between 1845 and 1847, before serving as a deputy member of the Storting between 1848 and 1850, after which he returned to a full member between 1851 and 1870. Wiig served as a deputy member between 1871 and 1873 before finishing off his career as full member between 1874 and 1879.

== Early life ==
Wiig was born on October 10, 1802, in Trøgstad, Norway. He spent most of his early life as a farmer.

== Mayor of Trogstad (1844–1847) ==
Wiig was mayor of Trøgstad briefly between 1844 and 1847. When his term ended, he was succeeded by Zyprian Svendsen Sødtland.

== Storting career (1845–1879) ==
Wiig was elected to the Storting in 1845 as a member from Smaalenenes Amt (Østfold). His first term ended in 1847. In 1848 he was elected as a deputy member, which he served as until 1850. In 1851 he was again elected as a full member, serving 7 terms consecutive. In 1871 he began a term as a deputy member. In 1873 his deputy member term ended. In 1874 he was yet again elected as a full member of the Storting, serving two more terms before retiring to his mill in 1879.

== Later years ==
Wiig retired to the Lier, Norway region, where he founded a cardboard and paper factory, Stiklen cardboard and paper factory, which had around 25 employees c. 1880. Wiig died on 29 September 1887 in Trøgstad.
