= Indre Østfold =

Region north in the former county of Østfold

Map over Østfold. Indre Østfold in blue.

Indre Østfold is a mostly rural countryside region north in the former county of Østfold county in Norway, noted for its mostly unspoilt nature and for its agriculture.

At January 1. 2020 five of the municipalities of Indre Østfold merged into the new Indre Østfold municipality at the same date as the Østfold fylke and neighbouring Akershus fylke merged with Buskerud fylke and became regions in the new Viken fylke (county).

Today the region consists of these five municipalities:

- Indre Østfold
- Marker Kommune (Marker, Norway)
- Skiptvet
- Rakkestad
- Aremark
- Former municipality of Rømskog, now a part of the municipality of Aurskog-Høland.

== Location ==
It is located around 30 kilometers from Norway's capital Oslo, with the Europavei ("Europe Way" / European route) E18 as the main arterial road through the region, and several Riksvei national roads running through the area. Indre Østfold also has its own rail route, the Eastern Østfold Line of the Østfold Line, and is around 50 kilometers by car from Rygge Airport.

Haldenskanalen (The Halden Canal in Norwegian) is the oldest constructed water canal in the country and has the highest continuous lock system in Europe.

== History and politics ==
The ten municipalities which form the region together form the Indre Østfold Regional Council.

The Indre Østfold region has played a central role in Norwegian history and has defence works from various periods.

== See also ==
- Indre Østfold municipality

Municipality	Internet site
Aremark	
Askim	
Eidsberg	
Hobøl	
Marker	
Rakkestad	
Rømskog	
Skiptvet	(in Norwegian)
Spydeberg	
Trøgstad	
