= Fossum Bridge =

Road bridge in Norway

Coordinates: 59°36′11″N 11°06′08″E

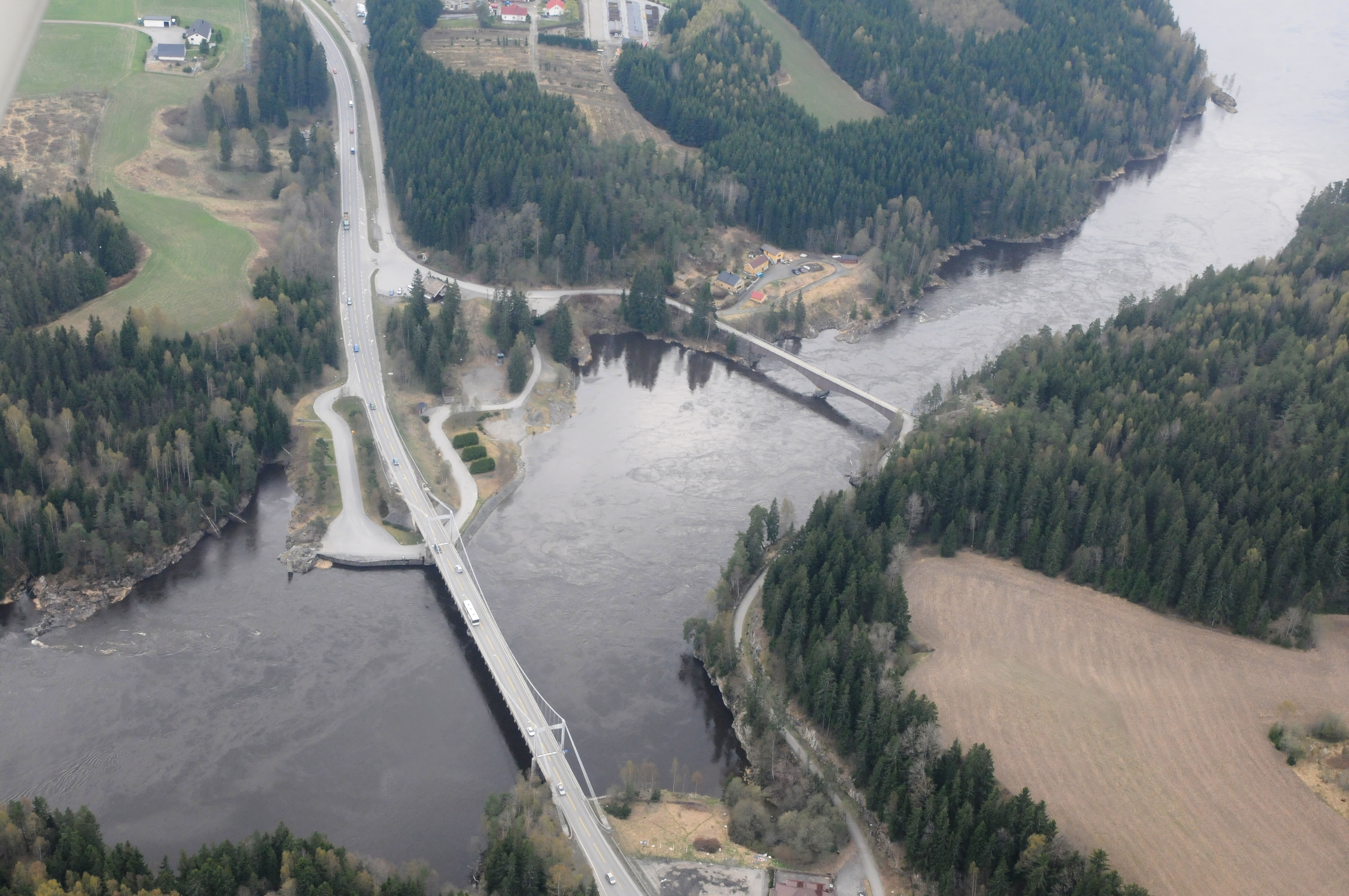
Aerial view of Fossum Bridge

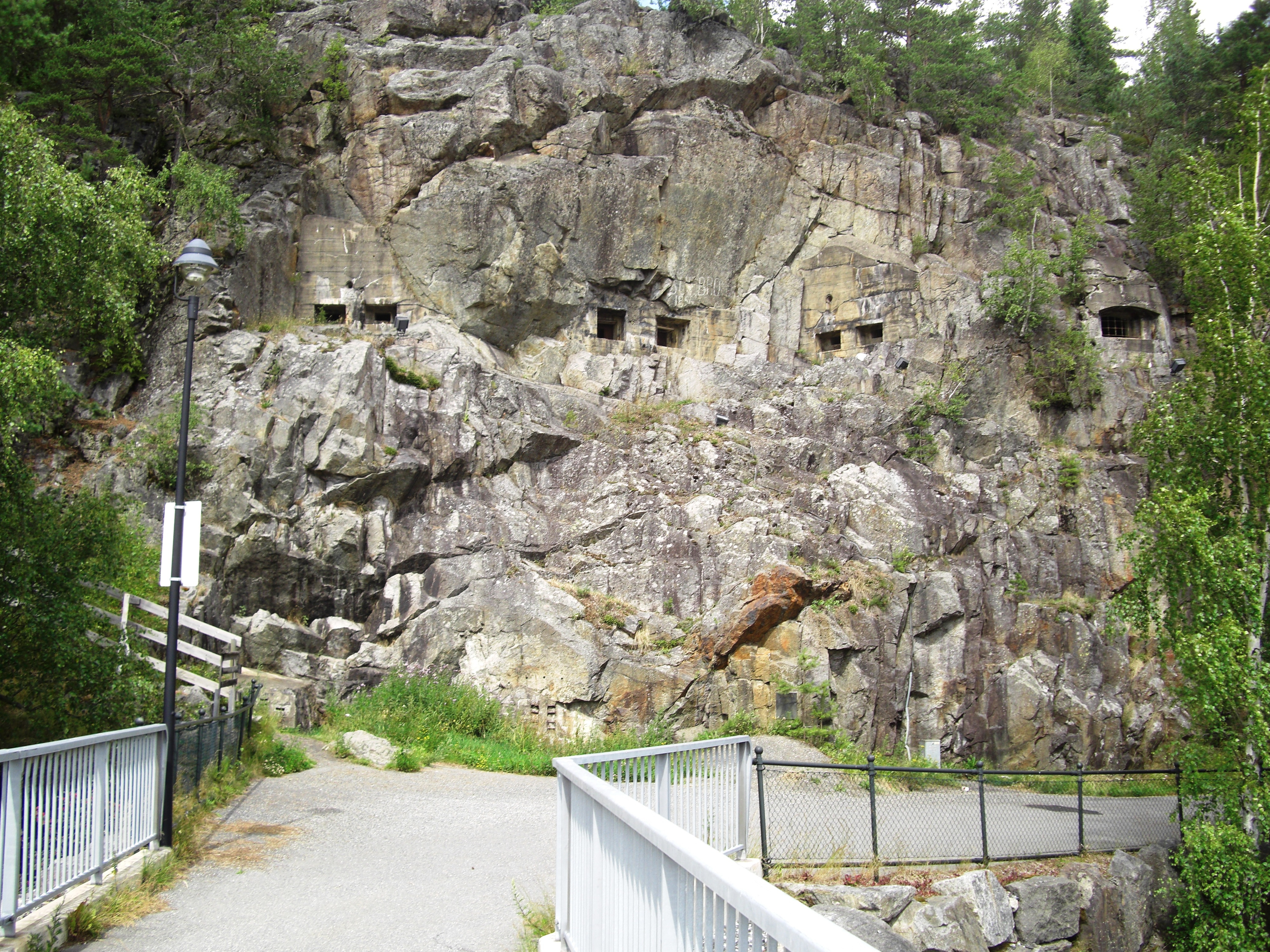
Fossum bridge defense galleries constructed after the Dissolution of the union between Norway and Sweden in 1905

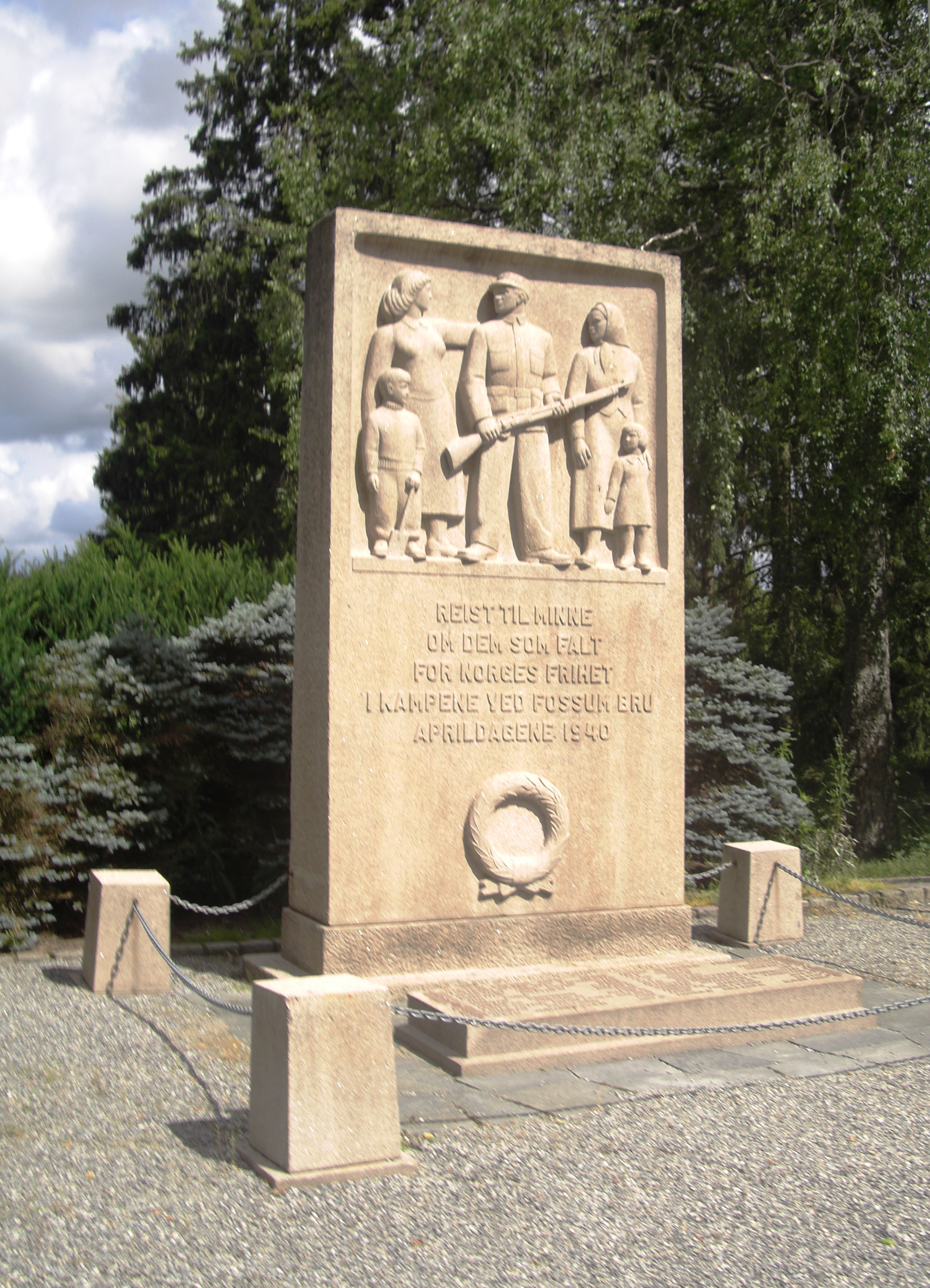
Fossum bru War memorial

Fossum Bridge (Fossum bru) is a bridge crossing the river Glomma at Askim in Østfold county, Norway. The old wooden bridge was an arch bridge with two spans which opened in 1856. That bridge was partly destroyed in the Battle of Fossum Bridge during the Nazi invasion of Norway in April 1940. The current bridge dates from 1961 and is a suspension bridge with a main span of 125 metres.

== Related reading ==
- Haugen, Dag B. (1990) Indre Østfold i krig : en berettelse om kampene i Indre Østfold for 50 år siden
