= Halvor Heyerdahl Rasch =

Norwegian zoologist and educator (1805–1883)

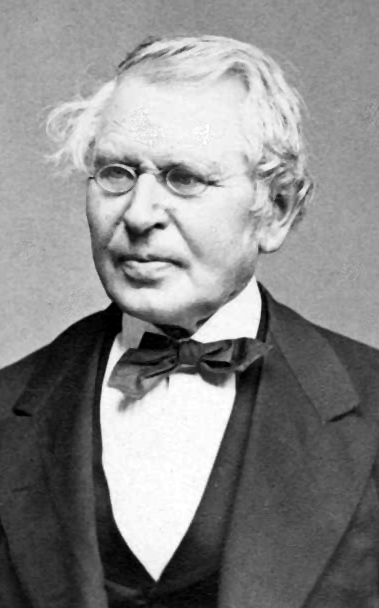

Halvor Heyerdahl Rasch (8 January 1805 – 26 August 1883) was a Norwegian zoologist and educator.

He was born at Eidsberg in Østfold, Norway. Rasch studied botany and zoology at the University of Christiania (now University of Oslo). He was a professor of zoology and natural science at the University of Oslo from 1852 to 1874, having previously been a lector since 1847.

An avid hunter and sportsman, he published the book Jagten i Norge (1845) as well as works about livestock, oyster cultivation and beekeeping. He was among the founders of the Centralforeningen for Udbredelse af Legemsøvelser og Vaabenbrug, a precursor to the Norwegian Confederation of Sports, in 1861.

Rasch was decorated as a Knight of the Royal Norwegian Order of St. Olav in 1863 and received the Silver Medal of the Société Impériale Zoologique d'Acclimatation at Paris in 1866.
