= Tryggve Fossum =

Norwegian computer architect

Tryggve Fossum is a Norwegian computer architect at Intel. He transferred there from DEC, where he was a lead architect of Alpha processors, after working on several VAX processors.
