= Trøgstad =

Trøgstad Municipality Trøgstad kommune
- Municipality
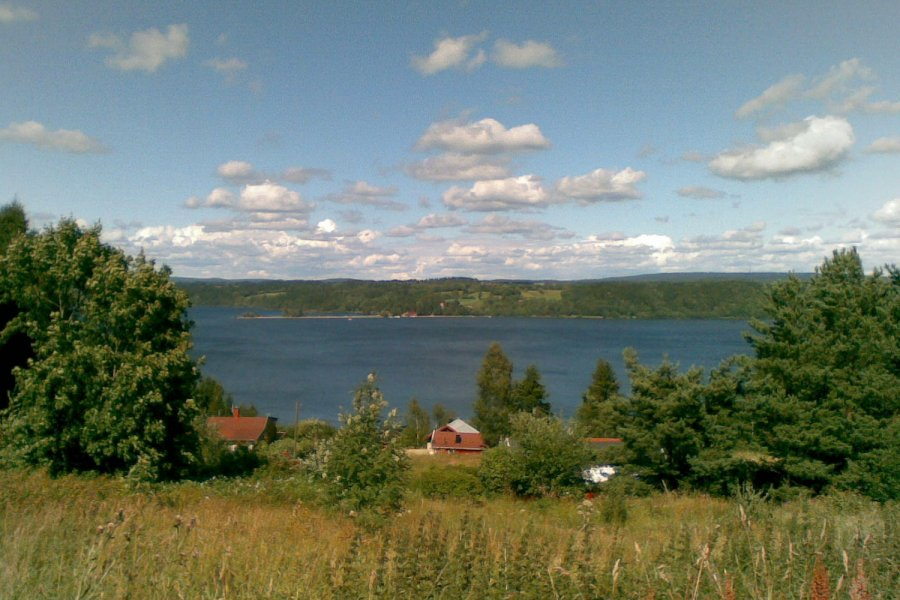

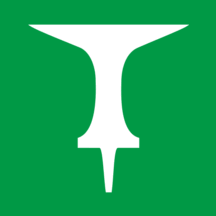
- Flag Coat of arms

- Østfold within Norway

- Trøgstad within Østfold
- Coordinates: 59°39′5″N 11°20′23″E
- Country: Norway
- County: Østfold
- Administrative centre: Skjønhaug

Government
  - Mayor (2019): Svend Saxe Frøshaug (Sp)

Area
  - Total: 204 km^{2} (79 sq mi)
  - Land: 188 km^{2} (73 sq mi)
  - Rank: #328 in Norway

Population (2004)
  - Total: 4,953
  - Rank: #193 in Norway
  - Density: 284.646/km^{2} (737.23/sq mi)
  - Change (10 years): ▲ +3.5%
- Demonym: Trøgsting

Official language
  - Norwegian form: Bokmål
- Time zone: UTC+01:00 (CET)
  - Summer (DST): UTC+02:00 (CEST)
- ISO 3166 code: NO-0122
- Website: Official website

Trøgstad was a municipality in Østfold county, Norway. The administrative centre of the municipality was the village of Skjønhaug. The municipality included the parishes of Skjønhaug, Havnås and Båstad. The parish of Trygstad was established as a municipality on 1 January 1838 (see formannskapsdistrikt).

Trøgstad is now part of the municipality Indre Østfold.

The scene of the crime for the World War II-era Feldmann case is at Skrikerudtjernet in Trøgstad.

== General information ==
=== Name ===
The municipality (originally the parish) is named after the old Trøgstad farm (Old Norse: Þrygsstaðir and/or Þrjúgsstaðir), since the first church was built here. The meaning of the first element is not known (maybe a male nickname) and the last element is staðir which means "homestead" or "farm". Prior to 1889, the name was written "Trygstad".

=== Coat of arms ===
The coat of arms is from modern times. They were granted on 24 August 1979. The arms show an anvil and was chosen because Trøgstad historically was well known for the quality of its blacksmiths who made iron tools and objects. The green background of the shield symbolizes the fields and forests in the municipality. The arms were designed by Truls Nygaard. (See also coat-of-arms of Hol)

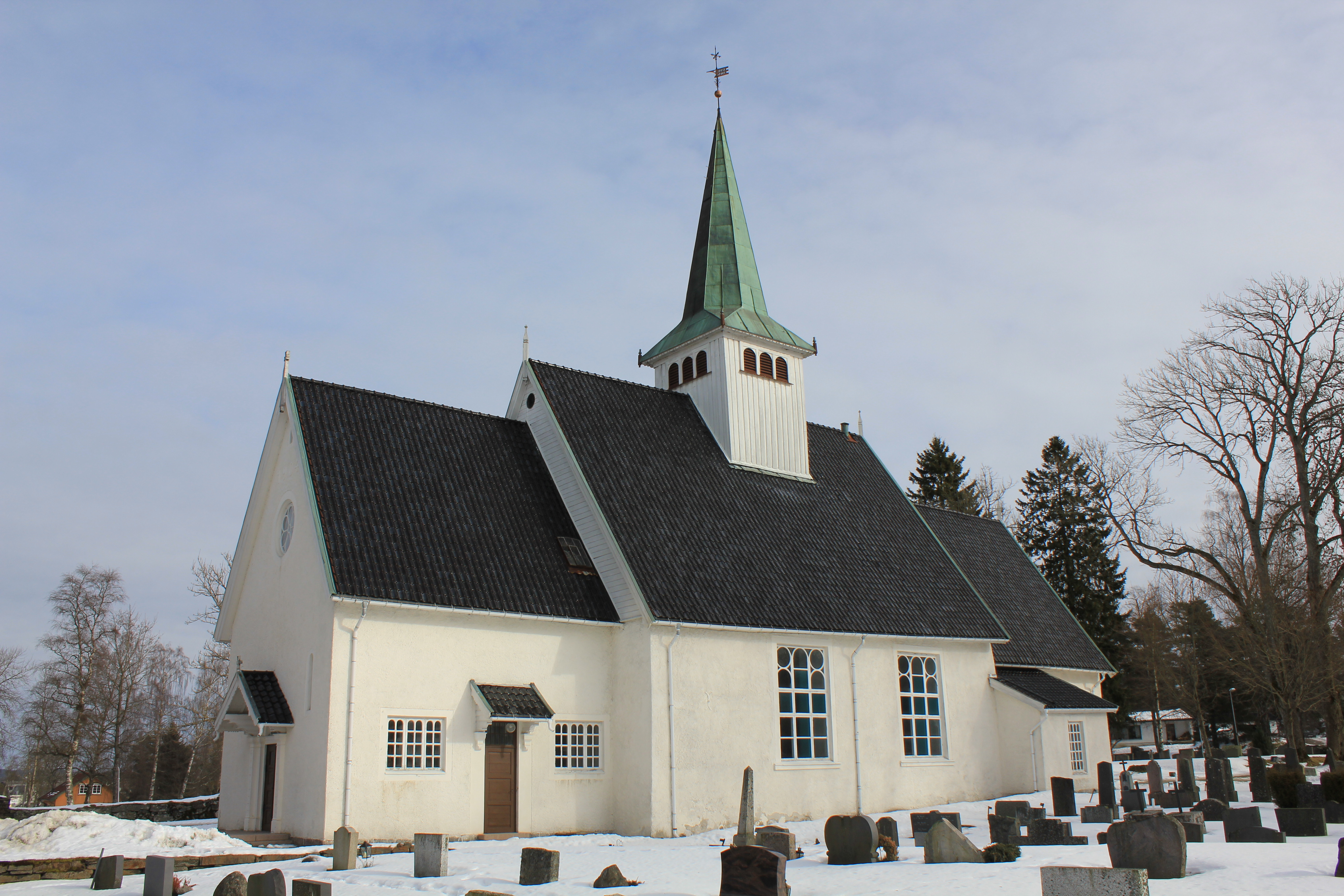
Trøgstad Church

=== Trøgstad Church ===
Trøgstad Church (Trøgstad kirke) is a medieval era, stone church. It belongs to Østre Borgesyssel deanery in Diocese of Borg. The church is located on a ridge south of Øyeren. The church is of Romanesque architecture and has a rectangular nave with a lower and narrower choir.

The church is probably built ca. 1250. It was the equipped with turret with a bell tower ca. 1620. This had to be demolished and replaced with a new tower in 1700. A sacristy was built by the choir's north face in 1697. In 1904 the church was extended and rebuilt, the western wall and the porch were demolished and choir was extended. After rebuilding the church has approximately 350 seats.

== Minorities ==
Number of minorities (1st and 2nd generation) in Trøgstad by country of origin in 2017
Ancestry	Number
Poland	111
Lithuania	104
Denmark	31
Sweden	31
Latvia	21

== Sister cities ==
Trøgstad has the following sister cities:

- Estonia - Kadrina, Lääne-Viru, Estonia
- Finland - Kinnula, Länsi-Suomen lääni, Finland
- Canada - Robertville, New Brunswick, Canada
