= European route E18 =

Route in European road network

E18

Route information
- Length: 1,890 km (1,170 mi)

Major junctions
- West end: Craigavon, United Kingdom
- E6 in Oslo, Norway; E16 Sandvika, Norway
- East end: Saint Petersburg, Russia

Location
- Countries: United Kingdom, Norway, Sweden, Finland, Russia

Highway system
- International E-road network; A Class; B Class

European route E18 runs between Craigavon in Northern Ireland and Saint Petersburg in Russia, passing through Scotland, England, Norway, Sweden and Finland. It is about 1,890 kilometres (1,170 miles) in length.

Although the designation implies the possibility of a through journey, this is no longer practical as there are no direct car ferry crossings between the United Kingdom and Norway.

== United Kingdom ==
The route starts in Northern Ireland and runs from Craigavon (M1) – Belfast (M2, A8) – Larne, then to Scotland: Stranraer, Dumfries and Galloway (A75) – Gretna – then England via the (M6) – Carlisle (A69) to Newcastle. As is normal for European routes in the United Kingdom, it is not signposted as such.

=== Northern Ireland ===
- : Craigavon – Belfast (Start of multiplex with E1 at Lisburn)
- : Belfast
- : Belfast – (Multiplex with E16)
- : –
- : – Larne (End of multiplex with E1)

=== North Channel ===
- : Larne – Cairnryan

=== Great Britain ===
- : Stranraer –
- : – Anglo-Scottish border (Start of multiplex with E5)
- : Anglo-Scottish border – Carlisle (End of multiplex with E5)
- : Carlisle – Newcastle upon Tyne (Interchange with E15 at)

== North Sea ==
There are no car ferries from Newcastle to Norway. Freight-only ferries may operate from other United Kingdom ports to Norway or Denmark, but for car journeys the only practical route is a crossing to France, Belgium or the Netherlands, followed by a road journey through Germany and Denmark, and a ferry crossing from there to Norway.

== Norway ==
The route continues as a motorway from Kristiansand in Norway. E18 is connected with the E39 Ferry to Denmark. The ferry runs from Kristansand to Hirtshals, takes about 3 hours and 15 minutes, and is operated by Color Line.

In Norway, the E18 has a length of 410 kilometres (255 mi), of which 232 kilometres (144 mi) are motorway. It runs Kristiansand – Arendal – Porsgrunn – Larvik – Sandefjord – Tønsberg – Horten – Drammen – Oslo – Ås – Askim – Ørje (at the Swedish border).

A flyover carrying the E18 Holmestrand bypass, opened in 2001, partially collapsed in February 2015 following a landslip, necessitating its demolition and reconstruction.

== Sweden ==
From Ørje, the E18 crosses the border into Sweden at Töcksfors. It has a length of 510 kilometres (317 mi), of which 245 kilometres (152 mi) are motorway. It runs Töcksfors – Karlstad – Örebro – Västerås – Stockholm / Kapellskär.

== Baltic Sea ==
The connection over the Baltic Sea is from Stockholm or Kapellskär in Sweden via Åland to Turku or Naantali in Finland, by ferries operated by Silja Line, Viking Line or Finnlines. It is also possible to take a direct ferry from Stockholm to Helsinki or to continue from Åland by island hopping over bridges, by cable ferries and ferries in Åland and Åboland, partly along the Archipelago Ring Road, but these routes are not part of the E18.

== Finland ==
In Finland the E18 goes from Åland through southern Finland by way of Naantali – Turku – Salo – Lohja - Nummela – Espoo – Vantaa – Porvoo – Loviisa – Pyhtää – Kotka – Hamina – Vaalimaa to the border with Russia. Crossing the border to Russia often used to require queuing as the volume of traffic using it increased. The situation has since 2009 improved thanks to increased capacity, and a new parking lot constructed by 2016 is expected to solve the problem for good.

== Russia ==
In Russia, E18 goes along the M10 highway from the Finnish border to Saint Petersburg. The stretch of M10 between Saint Petersburg and the Finnish border was redesignated as A181 in 2018. The route runs through northwestern Leningrad Oblast and mostly through sparsely populated areas. Since 2003, after opening of the Vyborg bypass, E18 no longer goes through Vyborg. Near Saint Petersburg, the route runs through suburbs, such as Sestroretsk and Olgino. E18 terminates at the western border of Saint Petersburg.

There are plans to expand the road from one to three lanes in each direction because of the increasing volume of traffic. In 2012, the highway has been connected with the Western Rapid Diameter near Beloostrov by expanded existing junction of M10 with the Zelenogorsk highway. It is likely to be a new terminus of E18.

== Gallery ==
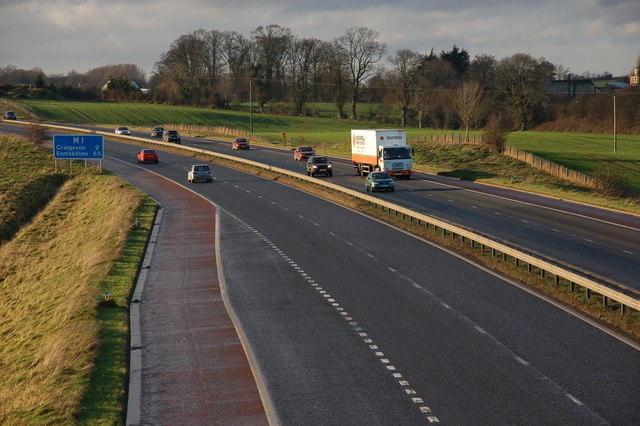
The M1 near Craigavon, Northern Ireland

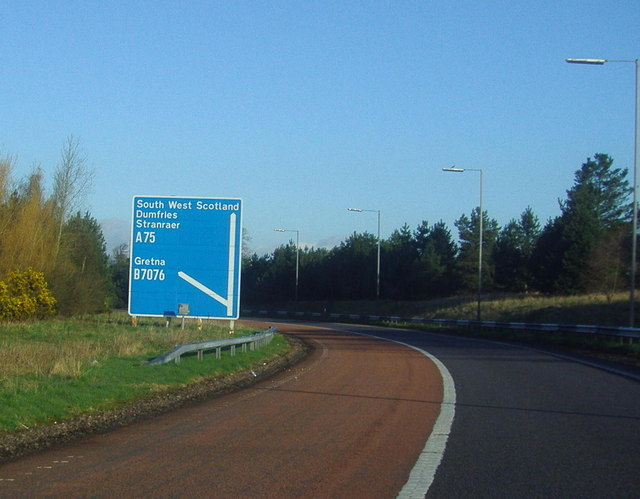
The A75 sign near Gretna, Scotland

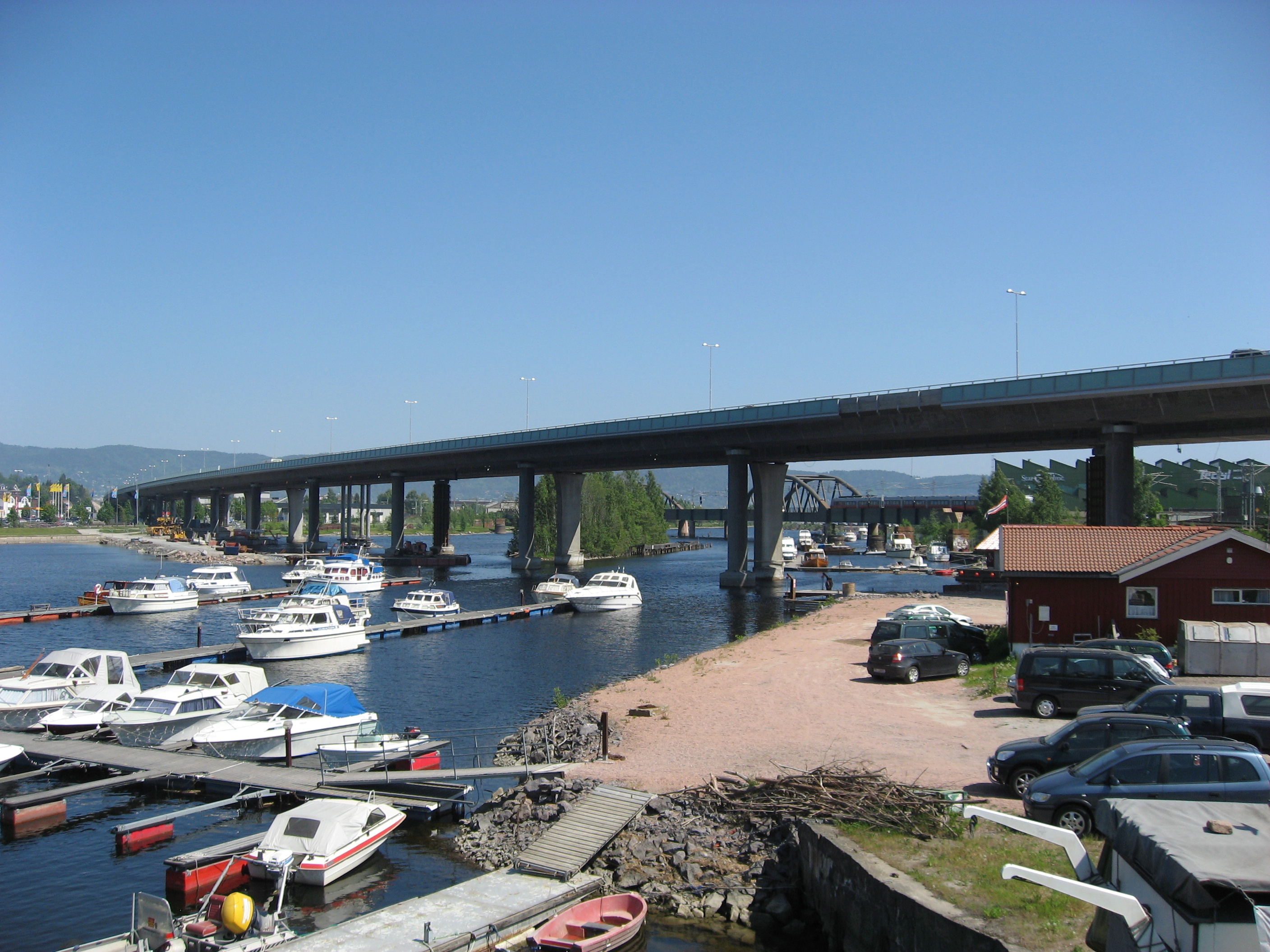
European Route E18 motorway leads over Drammen Bridge, Norway

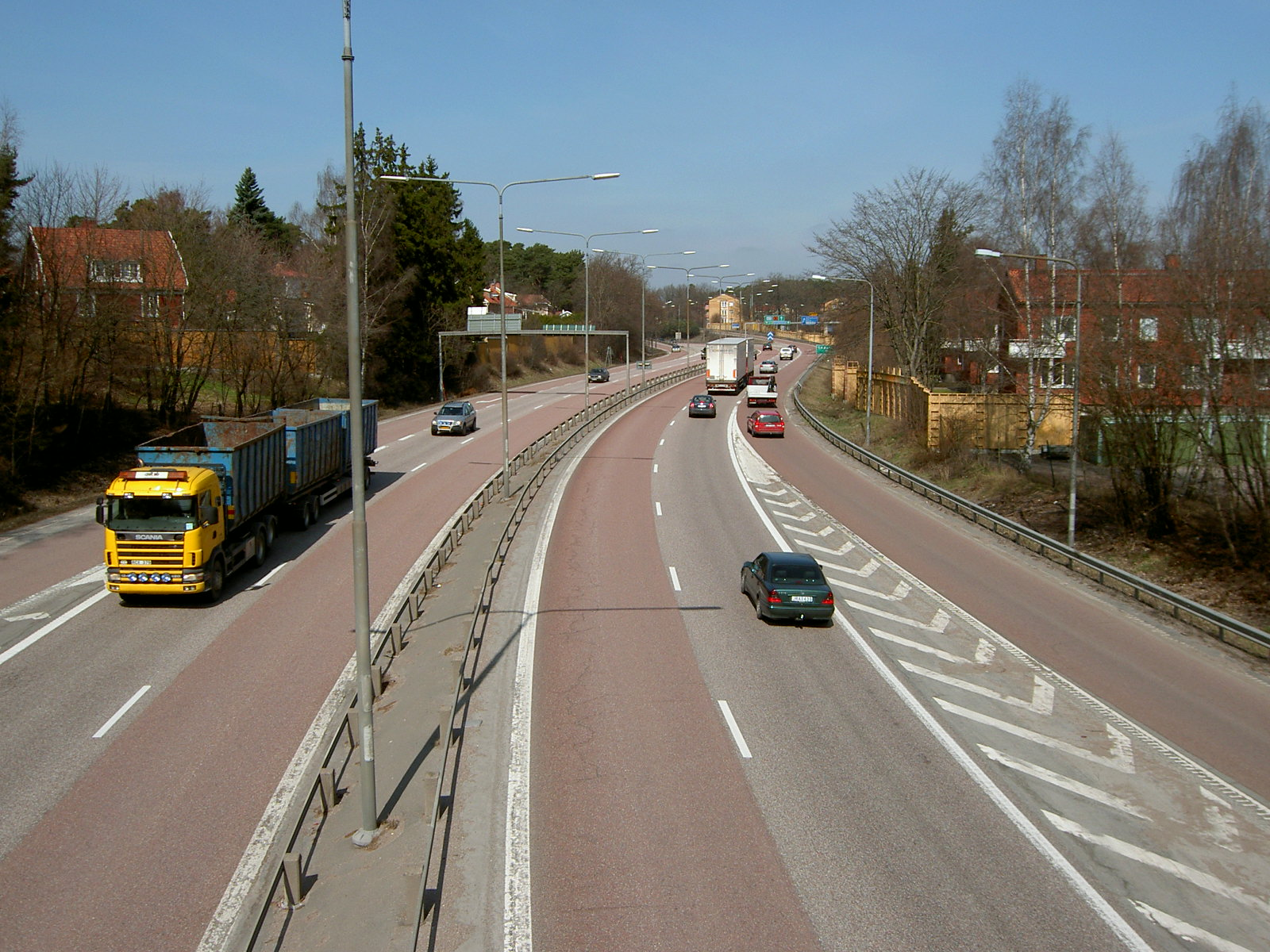
The E18 passing through Västerås, Sweden

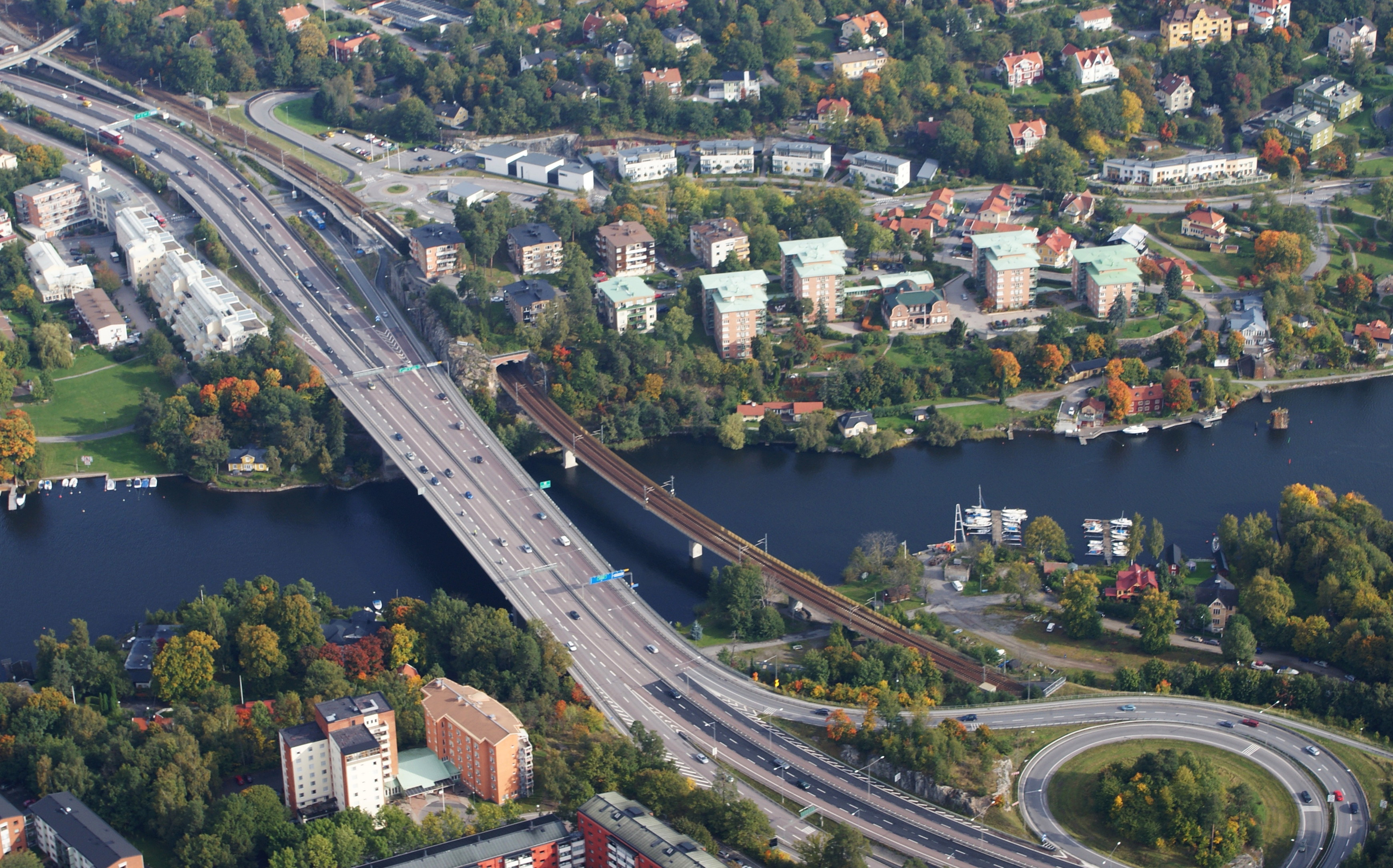
The E18 crossing the Stocksundet between Stockholm and Kapellskär

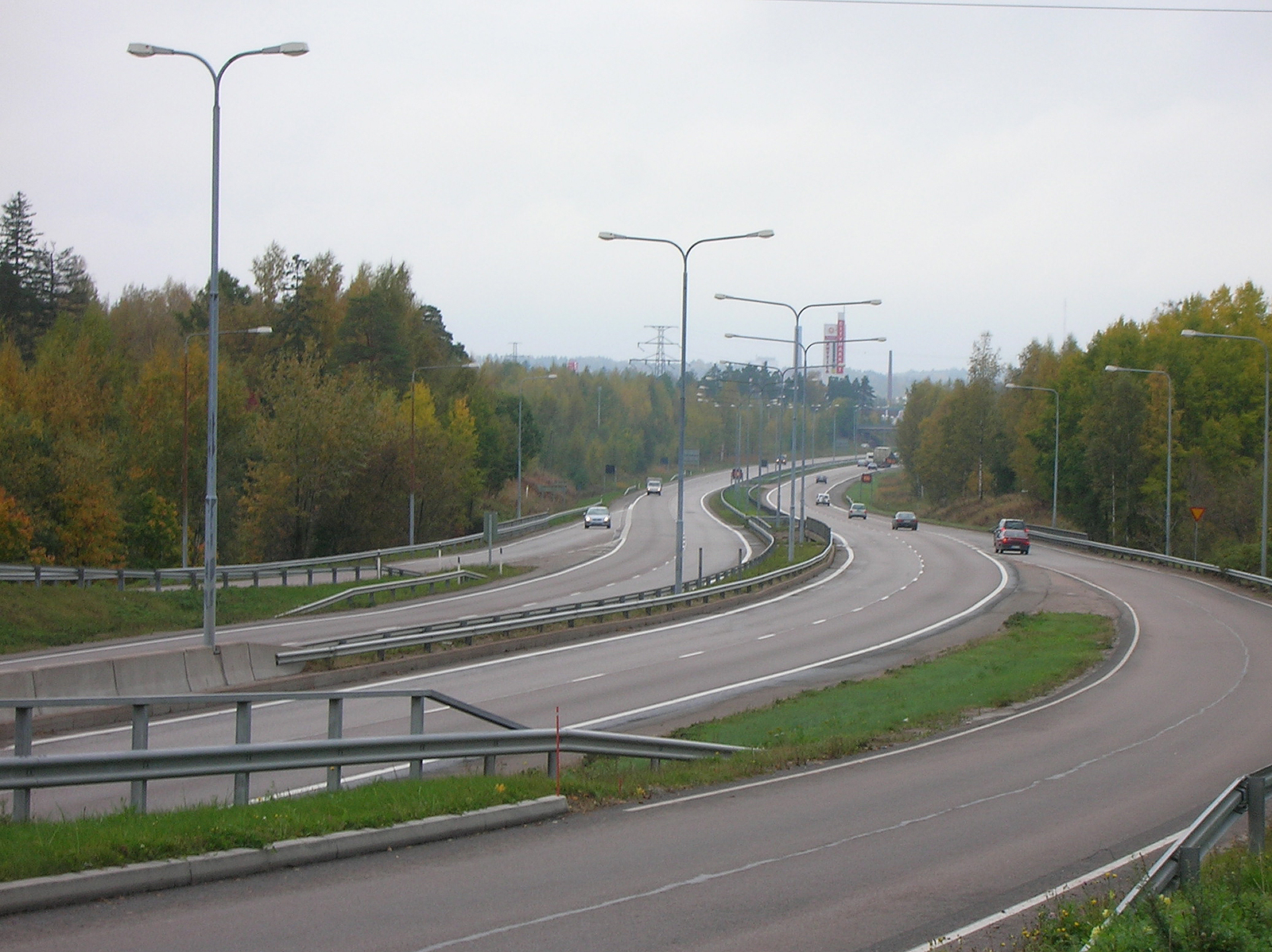
The E18 at Kotka, Finland
