= 2026 Bilderberg Conference =

Europe–North America forum in Washington, D.C.

2026 Bilderberg Conference 72nd Bilderberg Meeting
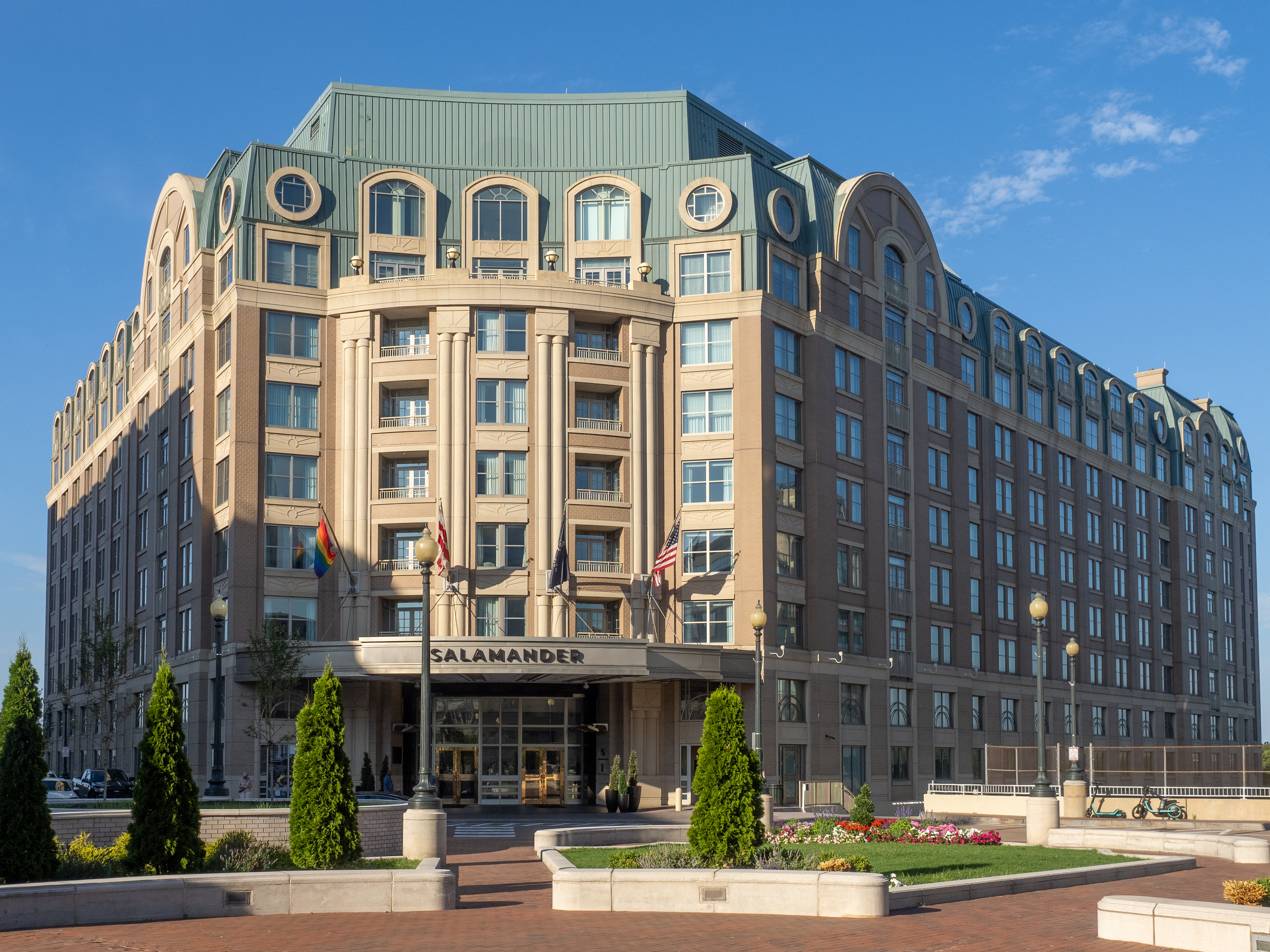
- Host country: United States
- Date: 9–12 April 2026
- Cities: Washington, D.C.
- Venues: Salamander Washington DC Hotel
- Participants: c. 128 from 23 countries
- Follows: 2025 Bilderberg Conference
- Precedes: 2027 Bilderberg Conference
- Website: bilderbergmeetings.org/meetings/meeting-2026/

The 2026 Bilderberg Conference was held between 9–12 April 2026 at the Salamander Washington DC Hotel in Washington, D.C., United States. The 2026 meeting was the 72nd edition of the event. A Bilderberg Group press release listed 128 participants from 23 countries and territories. This was the second conference to take place at the Salamander Hotel after the 2022 edition.

Established in 1954 by Prince Bernhard of the Netherlands, Bilderberg conferences (or meetings) are an annual private gathering of the European and North American political and business elite. Events are attended by between 120 and 150 people each year invited by the Bilderberg Group's steering committee; including prominent politicians, CEOs, national security experts, academics and journalists.

Bilderberg conferences operate under the Chatham House Rule, meaning that participants are sworn to secrecy and cannot disclose the identity or affiliation of any particular speaker. As a result, media are not invited and delegates rarely speak about what was discussed.

== Agenda ==
Key topics for discussion were announced on the Bilderberg website shortly before the meeting. These topics included:

- AI
- Arctic Security
- China
- Digital Finance
- Energy Diversification
- Europe
- Global Trade
- The Middle East
- Russia
- Trans-Atlantic Defence-Industrial Relationship
- Ukraine
- United States
- Future of Warfare
- The West

== Participants ==
A list of 128 participants was published on the Bilderberg website. This list may not be complete, as a source connected to the Bilderberg group told The Daily Telegraph in 2013 that some attendees do not have their names publicized.

Austria

- Peter Bosek
- Anna Thalhammer
- Gerhard Zeiler

Belgium

- Harold Boël
- Thomas Leysen
- Petra De Sutter

Canada

- Chrystia Freeland

Denmark

- Jeppe Christiansen
- Britt Meelby Jensen
- Margrethe Vestager

European Union (international)

- Nadia Calviño
- Andrius Kubilius

Finland

- Aaro Cantell
- Erkki Liikanen
- Alexander Stubb
- Elina Valtonen

France

- Valérie Baudson
- Henri de Castries
- Roland Lescure
- Catherine MacGregor
- Ross McInnes
- Arthur Mensch
- Patrick Pouyanné
- Nicolas Roche fr
- Luis Vassy

Germany

- Roland Busch
- Mathias Döpfner
- Jeanette zu Fürstenberg
- Karl-Theodor zu Guttenberg
- Uwe Horstmann
- Gundbert Scherf
- Christian Sewing
- Oliver Zipse

Greece

- Dimitri Papalexopoulos
- Kyriakos Pierrakakis
- Costantza Sbokou-Constantakopoulou

Greenland

- Vivian Motzfeldt

International Energy Agency (international)

- Fatih Birol

Ireland

- Jack Chambers
- Patrick Collison
- Anne Heraty
- Colin Hunt
- Danny McCoy

Italy

- Marco Alverà
- Vittorio Colao
- Enrico Letta
- Silvia Maria Rovere
- Valentino Valentini

NATO (international)

- Markus Laubenthal
- Geoffrey van Leeuwen
- Mark Rutte

Netherlands

- Roy Jakobs
- Rob Jetten
- Sigrid Kaag
- Willem-Alexander of the Netherlands
- Queen Máxima of the Netherlands
- Rolly van Rappard

Norway

- Øyvind Eriksen
- Jens Stoltenberg
- Nicolai Tangen

Poland

- Adam Bartosiewicz
- Wojciech Kostrzewa
- Jacek Olechowski
- Radoslaw Sikorski

Portugal

- José Manuel Barroso
- Duarte Moreira
- Guta Moura Guedes

Spain

- José Luis Escrivá
- Pilar Gil
- Alberto Nadal

Sweden

- Caroline Berg
- Daniel Ek
- Pål Jonson
- Marcus Wallenberg

Switzerland

- Helene Budliger
- André Hoffmann
- André Kudelski

Turkey

- Ali Koç
- Murat Özyeğin
- Feridun H. Sinirlioğlu
- Mehmet Tara
- Ayse Zarakol

Ukraine

- Oleksandr Kamyshin
- Iryna Terekh

United Kingdom

- Murray Auchincloss
- Camilla Cavendish
- Demis Hassabis
- David Lammy
- Blaise Metreweli
- Zanny Minton Beddoes
- Gideon Rachman
- John Sawers
- Mark Sedwill
- Mark Tucker

United States

- Stacey Abrams
- Anne Applebaum
- Albert Bourla
- Douglas Burgum
- Jack Clark
- Daniel P. Driscoll
- Elizabeth Economy
- Niall Ferguson
- Rana Foroohar
- Jamieson Greer
- Kevin Harrington
- Kimberly Kagan
- Alex Karp
- David Kirtley
- Stephen Kotkin
- Michael Kratsios
- Henry R. Kravis
- Marie-Josée Kravis
- Robert Lighthizer
- Brett McGurk
- John Micklethwait
- Mira Murati
- Peter R. Orszag
- Samuel Paparo
- Skye Perryman
- Nadia Schadlow
- Brian Schimpf
- Eric E. Schmidt
- Terri Sewell
- Faryar Shirzad
- Brad Smith
- Jason Smith
- Alexandr Wang
- Fareed Zakaria
