= 2022 Bilderberg Conference =

Europe–North America forum in Washington, D.C.

2022 Bilderberg Conference 68th Bilderberg Meeting
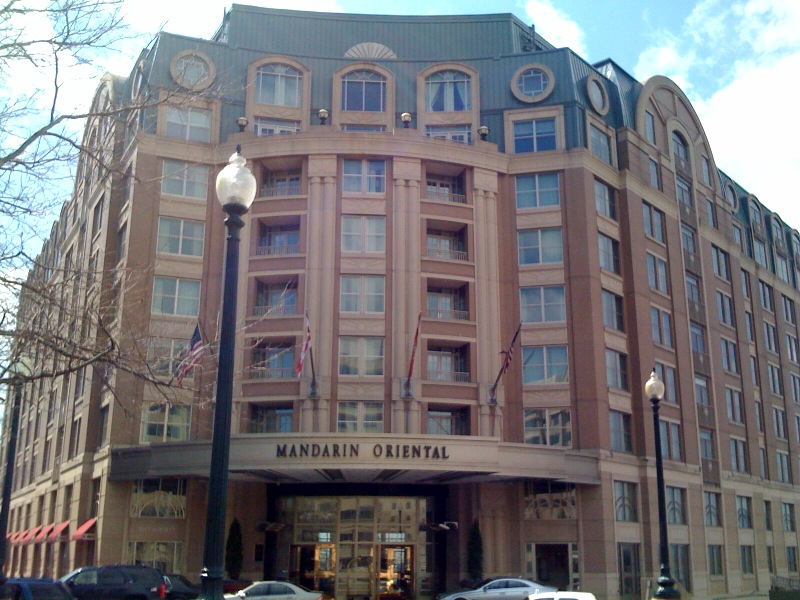
- Host country: United States
- Date: June 2–5, 2022
- Cities: Washington, D.C.
- Venues: Mandarin Oriental
- Participants: c. 120 from 21 countries
- Follows: 2019 Bilderberg Conference
- Precedes: 2023 Bilderberg Conference
- Website: https://bilderbergmeetings.org/meetings/meeting-2022/

The 2022 Bilderberg Conference was held between June 2–5 at the Mandarin Oriental in Washington, D.C. (now the Salamander Washington DC Hotel). It was the first time the conference had convened in person since 2019, due to the COVID-19 pandemic. A Bilderberg Group press release stated that there were approximately 120 participants from 21 countries. The 2022 meeting was the 68th edition of the event.

Established in 1954 by Prince Bernhard of the Netherlands, Bilderberg conferences are an annual private gathering of the European and North American political and business elite. Events are attended by between 120 and 150 people each year invited by the Bilderberg Group's steering committee; including high-level politicians, CEOs, national security experts, academics and journalists.

During the conference, the Mandarin Oriental was entirely booked out and cordoned off with barricades. Police cars and limousines were reported to be surrounding the entrance, and a Hong Kong flag was flown outside the hotel. Hotel staff spoken to by journalists from The Australian claimed to either not know what was going on inside, or that they could not say.

== Agenda ==
The key topics for discussion at the 2022 Bilderberg conference were announced on the Bilderberg website shortly before the meeting. Topics for discussion included:

- Geopolitical Realignments
- NATO Challenges
- China
- Indo-Pacific Realignment
- Sino-US Tech Competition
- Russia
- Continuity of Government and the Economy
- Disruption of the Global financial system
- Disinformation
- Energy Security and Sustainability
- Post Pandemic Health
- Fragmentation of Democratic Societies
- Trade and Deglobalization
- Ukraine

== Participants ==
A list of 120 participants was published on the Bilderberg website. This list may not be complete, as a source connected to the Bilderberg group told The Daily Telegraph in 2013 that some attendees do not have their names publicized. The Guardian reported that it was "highly likely" that President of Ukraine Volodymyr Zelenskyy would be joining the meeting via Zoom.

Austria

- Beate Meinl-Reisinger
- Andreas Treichl
- Gerhard Zeiler

Belgium

- Thomas Leysen
- Tinne Van der Straeten

Canada

- Mark J. Carney
- Charles Emond
- Chrystia Freeland
- Mark Little
- Tobias Lütke

Denmark

- Ida Auken
- Connie Hedegaard
- Martin Krasnik

European Union (International)

- Charles Michel
- Didier Reynders
- Margaritis Schinas

Finland

- Erkki Liikanen
- Sanna Marin
- Kaius Niemi

France

- Patricia Barbizet
- Valérie Baudson
- Thomas Buberl
- Bernard Émié
- Patrick Pouyanné

Germany

- Paul M. Achleitner (treasurer)
- Mathias Döpfner
- Jörg Kukies
- Constanze Stelzenmüller

Greece

- Dimitri Papalexopoulos
- Kyriakos Pierrakakis
- Markos Veremis

Ireland

- Thomas Byrne
- Paschal Donohoe
- Michael O'Leary

Italy

- Stefano Feltri
- Francesco Starace

NATO (International)

- Jens Stoltenberg

Netherlands

- Ben van Beurden
- Victor Halberstadt (co-chair)
- Ralph Hamers
- Wopke Hoekstra
- Jean Marc Huët
- Willem-Alexander of the Netherlands
- Mark Rutte
- Peter Wennink

Norway

- Øyvind Eriksen
- Grace Reksten Skaugen

Poland

- Wojciech Kostrzewa
- Radoslaw Sikorski

Portugal

- José Luís Arnaut
- José Manuel Barroso
- Isabel Furtado
- Ana Pinho
- Diogo Salvi
- Nuno Sebastião

Spain

- José Manuel Albares
- Pablo Casado
- Carlos Núñez

Sweden

- Lena Hallengren
- Martin Lundstedt
- Marcus Wallenberg

Switzerland

- Sergio Ermotti
- André Kudelski
- Livia Leu

Turkey

- Emre Erdogan
- Ömer Koç
- Mithat Rende
- Murat Yetkin
- Afsin Yurdakul

Ukraine

- Oksana Markarowa
- Yuriy Vitrenko

United Kingdom

- Jeremy Fleming
- Michael Gove
- Demis Hassabis
- Shashank Joshi
- David Lammy
- Bernard Looney
- Zanny Minton Beddoes
- Gideon Rachman
- John Sawers
- Mark Sedwill
- Mustafa Suleyman
- Tom Tugendhat
- Emma Walmsley

United Nations (International)

- Audrey Azoulay

United States

- Adewale Adeyemo
- Roger C. Altman
- Sam Altman
- Anne Applebaum
- James H. Baker
- Albert Bourla
- William J. Burns
- Kurt Campbell
- Tarun Chhabra
- William C. Dudley
- Jen Easterly
- Elizabeth Economy
- Yaya Fanusie
- Mary Kay Henry
- Mellody Hobson
- Ben Hodges
- Reid Hoffman
- Alex Karp
- Henry A. Kissinger
- Michael Kofman
- Henry R. Kravis
- Marie-Josée Kravis (co-chair)
- Yann LeCun
- Michael Mullen
- Craig J. Mundie
- David H. Petraeus
- Gina M. Raimondo
- Nadia Schadlow
- Eric E. Schmidt
- Kevin Scott
- Kyrsten Sinema
- Jake Sullivan
- Ashley J. Tellis
- Peter Thiel
- Celeste Wallander

== See also ==
- List of Bilderberg meetings
