= List of Bilderberg meetings =

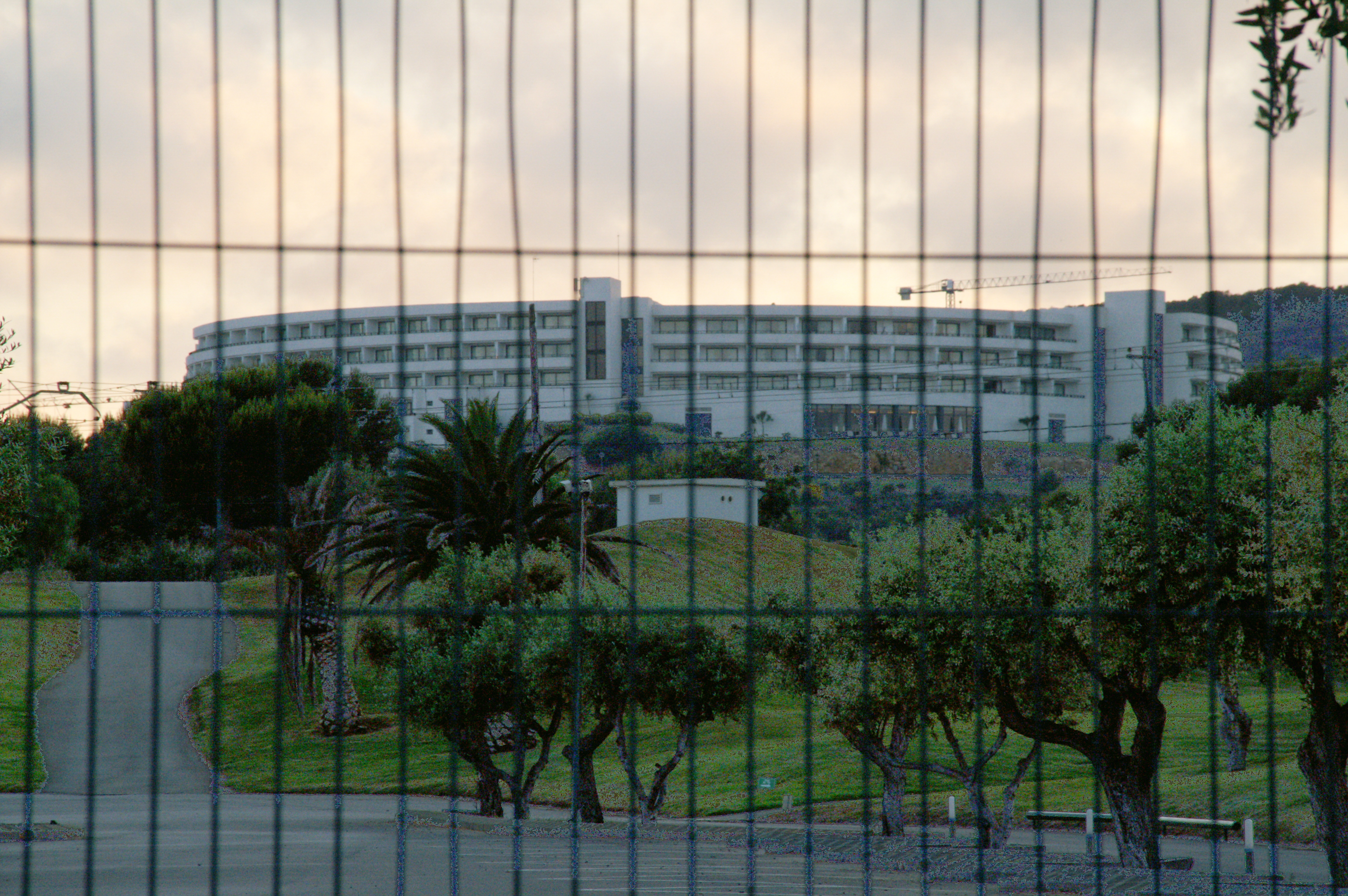
Dolce Sitges Resort, Sitges, Catalonia, Spain with Club de Golf Terramar in the foreground.

Since 1954, the Bilderberg Group has held a series of invitation-only meetings:

No.	Date	Hotel	Country	Location	Agenda
1	1954 (May 29–31)	Hotel de Bilderberg	Netherlands	Oosterbeek	I. The attitude towards communism and the Soviet Union II. The attitude towards dependent areas and people overseas III. The attitude towards economic policies and problems IV. The attitude towards European integration and the European Defense Community
2	1955 (March 18–20)	L'Hôtellerie du Bas-Bréau	France	Barbizon	I. Nationalism and neutralism as disruptive factors inside Western Alliances II. The Middle East III. The European policy of the Alliance, with special reference to the problems of Eastern Europe, German reunification, and military strategy
3	1955 (September 23–25)	Grand Hotel Sonnenbichl	West Germany	Garmisch-Partenkirchen	I. The future of NATO Defense II. Western economic co-operation, with special reference to the political consequences of the existence of separate currency areas within the Western world and to the Soviet economic challenge in the underdeveloped countries III. The Western approach to Soviet Russia and Communism
4	1956 (May 11–13)	Hotel Store Kro	Denmark	Fredensborg	I. Review of developments since the last Conference II. The causes of the growth of anti-Western blocs, in particular in the United Nations III. The role played by anti-colonialism in relations between Asians and the West IV. A common approach by the Western world towards China and the emergent nations of South and East Asia V. The communist campaign for political subversion or control of the newly emancipated countries of Asia VI. How the West can best meet Asian requirements in the technical and economic fields
5	1957 (February 15–17)	King and Prince Hotel	United States	St. Simons Island, Georgia	I. Review of events since the fourth Bilderberg meeting in May 1956 II. Nationalism and neutralism as disruptive factors inside the Western Alliance III. The Middle East IV. The European policy of the Alliance, with special reference to the problems of Eastern Europe, German reunification and military strategy
6	1957 (October 4–6)	Grand Hotel Palazzo della Fonte	Italy	Fiuggi	I. Survey of developments since the last Conference II. Modern weapons and disarmament in relation to Western security III. Are existing political and economic mechanisms within the Western community adequate?
7	1958 (September 13–15)	Palace Hotel	United Kingdom	Buxton	I. Survey of events since the last Conference II. The future of NATO defence III. Western economic cooperation IV. The Western approach to Soviet Russia and communism
8	1959 (September 18–20)	Çınar Hotel	Turkey	Istanbul	I. Review of developments since the last Conference II. Unity and division in Western policy
9	1960 (May 28–29)	Palace Hotel	Switzerland	Bürgenstock	I. State of the world situation after the failure of the Summit Conference II. New political and economic developments in the Western world
10	1961 (April 21–23)	Manoir St-Castin	Canada	Lac-Beauport, Quebec	I. What initiatives are required to bring about a new sense of leadership and direction within the Western community? II. The implications for Western unity of changes in the relative economic strength of the United States and Western Europe
11	1962 (May 18–20)	Grand Hotel Saltsjöbaden	Sweden	Saltsjöbaden	I. The political implications for the Atlantic community of its members' policies in the United Nations II. Implications for the Atlantic community of prospective developments
12	1963 (May 29–31)		France	Cannes	I. The balance of power in the light of recent international developments (This item will cover changes in power relations – political, economic and military – between the Communist and Western countries and inside each group.) II. Trade relations between the US and Europe in the light of the negotiations for Britain's entry into the Common Market III. Trade relations between the Western world and the developing countries (tariffs, quotas, commodity arrangements, etc.)
13	1964 (March 20–22)		United States	Williamsburg, Virginia	The consequences for the Atlantic Alliance of: I. Apparent changes in the Communist world a) Soviet internal developments b) The Communist Bloc II. Possible changes in the attitude of the USSR to the West III. Recent developments within the Western world A) Political: 1. How the Atlantic nations should organize themselves; 2. Attitudes towards relations with the Communist countries including China.; B) Military: 1. NATO strategy; 2. Sharing of responsibility for nuclear deterrent; C) Economic: 1. Recent developments in the Common Market notably in relation to agriculture and their impact; 2. UN Conference on trade and development, GATT/Kennedy Round; 3. International Finance; a) Balance of payments adjustment and capital markets; b) Liquidity and further evolution of the international monetary structure: 4. East–west trade: a) Trade with the USSR and European satellites b) Trade with Communist China and Cuba c) Trading rules and restrictions of credits d) Coordination of Atlantic Community policy
14	1965 (April 2–4)	Villa d'Este	Italy	Cernobbio	I. Monetary Co-operation in the Western World II. The State of the Atlantic Alliance
15	1966 (March 25–27)	Hotel Nassauer Hof	West Germany	Wiesbaden	I. Should NATO be reorganized, and if so how? II. The future of world economic relations especially between industrial and developing countries
16	1967 (March 31–April 2)		United Kingdom	Cambridge	I. Do the basic concepts of Atlantic cooperation remain valid for the evolving world situation? If not, what concepts could take their place? II. The technological gap between America and Europe with special reference to American involvement in Europe
17	1968 (April 26–28)		Canada	Mont Tremblant, Quebec	I. The relations between the West and the Communist countries II. Internationalization of business
18	1969 (May 9–11)	Hotel Marienlyst	Denmark	Helsingør	I. Elements of instability in Western society II. Conflicting attitudes within the Western world towards relations with the USSR and the other Communist states of Eastern Europe in the light of recent events
19	1970 (April 17–19)	Grand Hotel Quellenhof	Switzerland	Bad Ragaz, St. Gallen	I. Future function of the university in our society II. Priority in foreign policy
20	1971 (April 23–25)	Woodstock Inn	United States	Woodstock, Vermont	I. The contribution of business in dealing with current problems of social instability II. The possibility of a change of the American role in the world and its consequences
21	1972 (April 21–23)	La Reserve du Knokke-Heist	Belgium	Knokke-Heist	I. The state of the Western community in the light of changing relationships among the non-communist industrialized countries and the impact of changing power relationships in the Far East on Western security
22	1973 (May 11–13)	Grand Hotel Saltsjöbaden	Sweden	Saltsjöbaden	I. The possibilities of the development of a European energy policy, and the consequences of European-North American relations II. Conflicting expectations concerning the European Security Conference
23	1974 (April 19–21)	Chalet du Mont d'Arbois	France	Megève	I. Prospects for the Atlantic world
24	1975 (April 22–24)	Golden Dolphin Resort Hotel	Turkey	İzmir	I. Inflation: Its economic, social and political implications II. Recent international political developments: A. The present status and prospects to resolve the Arab-Israeli conflict and the effect on relations among NATO members B. Other recent developments affecting the relations among NATO countries
-	1976	Cancelled due to the ongoing Lockheed scandal involving Prince Bernhard at the time	United States	Hot Springs, Virginia	
25	1977 (April 22–24)	Imperial Hotel	United Kingdom	Torquay	I. North American and Western European attitudes towards II. The future of the mixed economies in the Western democracies III. The Third World’s demand for restructuring the world order and the political implications of these attitudes
26	1978 (April 21–23)	Chauncey Conference Center	United States	Princeton, New Jersey	I. Western defense with its political implications: A. An Overview of the Alliance Today B. The General Evolution of East-West Relations C. Crises Outside the Alliance Area D. The Current Military Balance E. Theater Nuclear Systems and the Neutron Bomb F. Consultation and Mutual Understanding G. Political and Economic Strains Within the Alliance H. Détente and Arms Control II. The changing structure of production and trade: consequences for the Western industrialized countries: A. The Role of the State in Structural Adaptation B. Structural Change and Economic Growth C. Implications for Employment, and the Role of Labor D. Trade Policy E. The Need for Monetary Stability III. Current Problems in European-American Relations
27	1979 (April 27–29)	Grand Hotel Sauerhof	Austria	Baden bei Wien	I. The present international monetary situation and its consequences for world economic cooperation: A. The Bretton Woods System and the Role of the Dollar B. Exchange Rates: Fixed or Floating? C. “Stateless Currency” and the Euromarkets D. The European Monetary System E. What Future for the IMF.? F. Multilateral Cooperation and Harmonization G. Monetary Implications of the Oil Situation II. The implications of instability in the Middle East and Africa for the Western world: A. The Iranian Revolution B. The Arab-Israeli Conflict C. Turkey: Again the Sick Man D. The Oil Imbroglio E. Islam, the Third World, and the West F. Security Considerations G. The Republic of South Africa and Namibia H. Rhodesia-Zimbabwe I. Economic Considerations III. Other current issues bearing on European-American relations: A. Relations with the Communist Powers B. “The German Question” C. The Austrian Example D. Transatlantic Moods and Attitudes
28	1980 (April 18–20)	Dorint Sofitel Quellenhof Aachen	West Germany	Aachen	I. Political Aspects: A. Iran B. Afghanistan C. Relations Among the Allies: Communication, Understanding, Leadership D. Division of Labor E. The Current American Mood F. The Political Evolution of Europe G. The Alliance and The Third World H. The Arab-Israeli Conflict II. Security Aspect: A. The Present Military Situation of NATO B. Strategic Issues C. The Need for Stronger Conventional Forces D. Security Threats Outside the Alliance Area E. The Question of Political Will III. Economic Aspect: A. The Management of Our Economies B. Monetary Relations C. Energy Considerations and the Impact of the Oil Price Increases D. The Less-Developed Countries E. Trade Relations
29	1981 (May 15–17)	Palace Hotel	Switzerland	Bürgenstock, Nidwalden	I. What should Western policy be toward the Soviet Union in the 1980s?: A. Changes in the Soviet Union B. Assessing Soviet Intentions C. Arms Negotiations and the Military Balance II. Obstacles to effective coordination of Western policies: A. Internal Stresses and Strains B. The Need for Consultation C. The Middle East III. How can the Western economies put their house in order?: A. President Reagan's Economic Program B. The State's Growing Share of the National Product C. The Decline in Productivity and Economic Growth D. Political Aspects IV. Panel on Current International Economic Issues: A. East-West Economic Relations B. Energy C. Japan's Performance D. Trade and Protectionism E. Interest Rates and Exchange Rates F. Recycling and Debts G. The North-South Dialogue H. International Economic Cooperation V. Discussion of Current Events: A. Foreign Poicy Prospects Under the New U.S. Administration B. Analyzing the French Election Results C. Crises Outside the NATO Area
30	1982 (May 14–16)	Rica Park Hotel Sandefjord	Norway	Sandefjord	I. Divergent policies and attitudes in the North Atlantic Community II. What can arms control achieve? III. Middle East: Issues at stake IV. Economic issues: dogmas and realities V. Discussion of Current events: A. The Falkland Islands Crisis B. East-West Relations: Poland, Trade, and Finance
31	1983 (May 13–15)	Château Montebello	Canada	Montebello, Quebec	I. East-West relations: constraints, détente or confrontation II. Issues in medium-term prospects for growth in the world economy: A. Protectionism and employment B. Risks in banking and finance III. Discussion of current events
32	1984 (May 11–13)	Grand Hotel Saltsjöbaden	Sweden	Saltsjöbaden	I. Western Power and the Middle East: A Case Study in Atlantic Relationships II. The State of Arms Control Negotiations III. Future Employment Trends in the Industrialized Democracies IV. Discussion of Current Events IV. The Soviet Union, the West and the Third World – A Case Study: Central America
33	1985 (May 10–12)	Doral Arrowwood Hotel	United States	Rye Brook, New York	I. Divergent social and economic trends in the Atlantic World II. How should the West deal with the Soviet Bloc? III. The Strategic Defense Initiative IV. How should the West deal with developing countries? V. Current events: the U.S. Budget and the European perspective VI. Operating the Alliance
34	1986 (April 25–27)	Gleneagles Hotel	United Kingdom	Gleneagles, Scotland	I. The Soviet Union under Gorbachev: foreign policy implications II. The Western global response to the Soviet challenge III. The fragmentation of the world economy: debt, currency disorder, protectionism, uneven growth IV. Current events: terrorism V. South Africa
35	1987 (April 24–26)	Villa d'Este	Italy	Cernobbio	I. Strategy toward the USSR II. Policy toward trade and protectionism III. The public sector and economic growth IV. Current events: China V. The arms control debate
36	1988 (June 3–5)	Interalpen-Hotel Tyrol	Austria	Telfs	I. What can be done with the world economy: alternative scenarios II. How to handle a world awash with public and private debt? III. The German question revisited IV. The new information era V. Briefing on the Moscow summit VI. The impact of glasnost VII. Future strategy of the Alliance VIII. The Gulf and Afghanistan
37	1989 (May 12–14)	Gran Hotel de La Toja	Spain	Isla de La Toja	I. Domestic developments in Eastern Europe: policy implications for the West II. Can the Alliance be sustained by military and arms control issues alone? III. The long-term economic design of the E.C.: European sovereignty? IV. Current events: U.S.-Soviet relations V. Greater political and monetary union of Europe: European sovereignty? VI. Global relationships: surpluses, deficits, and protectionism VII. Environmental constraints
38	1990 (May 11–13)	Harrison Conference Center	United States	Glen Cove, New York	I. The new Soviet (Dis)Union II. Strategy issues III. Economic relations with Eastern Europe IV. Can Western values be applied universally? V. Germany VI. The future of NATO and the European Community VII. Japan: political changes
39	1991 (June 6–9)	Hotel Badischer Hof (Baden-Baden) and Schlosshotel Bühlerhöhe	Germany	Baden-Baden and Bühl	I. Eastern Europe: economic prospects II. Developments in the Soviet Union: political and economic impacts on the Alliance III. The Middle East: political fallout and future prospects IV. Current Events: German Economic Reconciliation: the Treuhand Experience V. The Practical Agenda for the Alliance VI. Do we have the institutions to deal with the agenda? VII. Economic and financial threats to the Alliance VIII. Current Events: South Africa IX. Current Events: Yugoslavia
40	1992 (May 21–24)	Hôtel Royal (Evian-les-Bains) and Hôtel Ermitage	France	Évian-les-Bains	I. Prospects for the former Soviet republics II. What should be done for Eastern Europe? III. Whither America? IV. The world economy V. Whither Europe? VI. Remarks of Pierre Beregovoy, Prime Minister of France VII. Soviet Union: the view from Moscow VIII. Current Events: Yugoslavia IX. The migration issue X. The evolving West/West relationship
41	1993 (April 22–25)	Astir Palace Resort	Greece	Vouliagmeni	I. What kind of Europe will the U.S. have to deal with? II. Current events: Former Yugoslavia III. Restoring confidence in leadership and institutions IV. Prospects for Global Trade V. U.S. domestic policy concerns VI. The outlook for Japan's economy VII. Cost of indifference toward the former Soviet Union VIII. Current events: Italy IX. Foreign policy concerns of the Clinton Administration X. Crisis management
42	1994 (June 2–5)	Hilton Helsinki Kalastajatorppa	Finland	Helsinki	I. Redefinition of the Atlantic relationship in a time of change II. The changing face and perspective of America III. Europe – Cohesion or Confusion? IV. Economic instability ahead V. Jobs, where are they and how will the West create them? VI. The political changes of Islamic Fundamentalism VII. Russia – How will its internal evolution affect its external behavior? VIII. GATT: Risk ahead IX. Current events: North Korea X. China – The consequences of convulsion or stability
43	1995 (June 8–11)	Palace Hotel	Switzerland	Bürgenstock, Nidwalden	I. What is NATO supposed to do? II. Is there work for all? III. Atomization of society: Impact on political behavior of new technology IV. Looking (Back) at Washington V. Current events: Turkey and the Atlantic Alliance VI. Is there still a North Atlantic Community? VII. Should the European Union integrate further, and why? VIII. Our agendas for WTO and World Bank IX. Current events: Former Yugoslavia X. Peacekeeping in an UNstable World XI. Lessons of the New Currency Crises XII. Practical steps towards a better Global Governance and Rules
44	1996 (May 30–June 2)	The Kingbridge Centre	Canada	King City, Ontario	I. Status Report on the Alliance II. Former Yugoslavia III. Russia: Political Forces and Economic Prospects IV. Europe: the Politics of EU Enlargement V. Has Europe's Economy Run Out of Steam? VI. Will the Enlarged Union Survive EU's Success or Failure? VII. The U.S. Agenda VIII. The Israeli Election IX. How and How Much Can the Western World Grow Economically? X. WTO and the World Bank: Briefing XI. Where is China Going?
45	1997 (June 12–15)	Pine Isle Resort (demolished)	United States	Lake Lanier, Georgia	I. Will NATO's Enlargement Affect the Transatlantic Alliance? II. Do the World's Energy Needs Prevent Sustainable Development? III. Growth through Productivity Improvement: a Threat to Western Social Cohesion? IV. Peacekeeping: Assessments and Prospects-Bosnia, Albania, Cyprus V. Status Report on American Foreign Policy VI. How Should the West Look at China? VII. Corporate Survival: Breaking with Tradition in Governance VIII. EMU's Consequences Assuming it Goes Ahead IX. The Return of the European Left: Sign of Innovation or Reaction? X. Relationship of the West to Islam XI. World Bank Update
46	1998 (May 14–17)	Turnberry Hotel	United Kingdom	Turnberry	I. Current Events II. What Will be the Consequences of EMU? III. Is there Room for one Transatlantic Market Place? IV. Military Implications of the Growing Technological Disparity between the United States and Europe V. To what Extent Will Enlargement Redefine NATO's Relationship with Russia? VI. Is Europe's Social Model Dead? VII. A Review of the Crisis in Kosovo and Albania: the Role of the UN VIII. In the Light of the Asian Crisis should the World's Financial System be Reformed? IX. The Implications of the New India Nuclear Weapon Program X. Turkey's Role in the Western Alliance
47	1999 (June 3–6)	Caesar Park Penha Longa Hotel	Portugal	Linhó, Sintra, Portuguese Riviera	I. Kosovo II. The US Political Scene III. Current Controversies: Genetics and the Life Sciences IV. Redesigning the International Financial Architecture V. The Social and Political Impacts on Emerging Markets of Recent Economic Events VI. NATO's Future VII. The Relationship between Information Technology and Economic Policy VIII. Current Events IX. Russia's Foreign Policy X. How Durable is the Current Rosy Complexion of European Politics?
48	2000 (June 1–4)	Le Château du Lac	Belgium	Genval	I. The New Economy and its Effects on Society II. Globalisation under Threat: the Way forward for the WTO III. US Elections: State of Play and Foreign Policy Consequences IV. Cleaning up the Balkans V. EU Enlargement and its Implications for Geo-Political Balance VI. The European Far Right - Is there a Threat? VII. Current Affairs
49	2001 (May 24–27)	Hotel Stenungsbaden	Sweden	Stenungsund	I. European Security Defence Identity and Transatlantic Security - I II. Consequences of the Italian Elections III. What Does EU Enlargement Mean for the EU and the Rest of the World? IV. Productivity in Europe and the United States - Is the Gap Widening? V. Putin's Russia VI. What Can the World Do About the Middle East? VII. The New US Administration VIII. European Security Defence Identity and Transatlantic Security - II IX. The Rise of China: Its Impact on Asia and the World X. Policies for Trade Development and Economic Growth XI. What Should Governments Do About Food Quality? XII. Current Affairs
50	2002 (May 30 – June 2)	Westfields Marriott	United States	Chantilly, Virginia	I. The Consequences of the War Against Terrorism II. Corporate Governance: Does Capitalism Need Fixing? III. The Changing Nature of the EU Within the Western Alliance IV. Have Civil Liberties Been Unnecessarily Eroded? V. The Influence of the Extreme Right VI. The Middle East VII. Current Affairs VIII. Post-Crisis Reconstruction/Nation Rebuilding IX. Prospects for the World Economy X. Trade: The China Effect XI. The Influence of Domestic Issues on American Foreign Policy
51	2003 (May 15–18)	Trianon Palace Hotel	France	Versailles	I. The Middle East II: Future II. The Middle East I: Overview III. Post-Iraq: The Future of Multilateral Organisations IV. Re-Energising Germany V. Post-Mortem on Iraq: Diplomatic Failure and the Foreign Policy Consequences VI. Non-Proliferation VII. The European Convention VIII. The World's Economic Problems IX. Aspects of Terrorism X. Current Affairs
52	2004 (June 3–6)	Grand Hotel des Iles Borromées	Italy	Stresa	I. Energy: The Sustainability of Current Trends II. The Rules of the Game: Towards a 21st Century Concert? III. The Prospects for Iraq IV. Afghanistan, Including the Implications for Future NATO Operations in the Area V. European Geopolitics VI. Health and Development VII. The US Political Landscape VIII. Is China Changing the World? IX. Current Affairs: Russia X. The Middle East: Is Stability Within Reach? XI. World Economic Outlook XII.Corporate Fraud: How Lethal is the Cure?
53	2005 (May 5–8)	Seehotel Überfahrt	Germany	Rottach-Egern	I. What Do We Mean by Freedom? II. Development: Reflections and Perspectives III. How Can Europe and the US Work Together to Deal with Common Problems? IV. Iraq V. Asia: the Geo-Strategic Challenges VI. Where is Europe Going? VII. Israel-Palestine VIII. Russia: Do the Transatlantic Partners have a Common Strategy? IX. Failure of the Lisbon Agenda? X. The Non-Proliferation Treaty at Risk? XI. Iran XII. Current Affairs: Will the Fiscal Problems Facing Europe and the US Undermine Future Economic Performance?
54	2006 (June 8–11)	Brookstreet Hotel	Canada	Ottawa, Ontario	I. American Power and the Battle for Arab Reform II. Terrorist Movements in the Middle East III. The Challenges of Immigration IV. Israel-Palestine: One Year Later V. China - the Economic and Political Landscape VI. New Alignments in Asia: the Changing Strategic Landscape VII. Energy: What Are the Issues VIII. Energy: What Does Dependence Mean? IX. Russia: Quo Vadis? X. Economic Patriotism: A Real Threat? XI. Current Affairs: Italy XII. The Challenges of Deterrence in a Proliferating World XIII. Iran XIV. New Security Challenges for NATO, the EU: Afghanistan, Africa
55	2007 (May 31 – June 3)	Ritz-Carlton Hotel	Turkey	Istanbul	I. The New World Order: Uni-Polar or Non-Polar? II. Turkey and its Neighbours III. Europe and the US: Common and Conflicting Interests IV. The Mood of the US V. Democracy and Populism VI. Democracy in the Middle East VII. Turkey's Long-Term Development in Comparative Perspective VIII. Leadership Changes in Key European Countries (France-UK) IX. Information Technology: Globalising or Tribalising Force? X. Nuclear Non-Proliferation XI. The US: Cutting Issues in State-Federal Relations XII. Climate Change XIII. Current Affairs: Capital Markets: Risks and Opportunities of Private Equity and Hedge Funds
56	2008 (June 5–8)	Westfields Marriott	United States	Chantilly, Virginia	I. Cyber-terrorism II. A Nuclear-Free World III. Managing Financial Turbulence IV. US Foreign Policy Without Change V. How Serious Are the Threats on Our Economies VI. Islam in Europe VII. Africa VIII. Afghanistan, Challenge for the West IX. Iran-Pakistan X. A Look at the Future XI. The Mounting Threat of Protectionism XII. Russia XIII. After Bush: The Future of US-EU Relations XIV. Current Affairs: US Elections
57	2009 (May 14–16)	Astir Palace Resort	Greece	Vouliagmeni	I. Governments and Markets II. After the G20: The Role of Institutions III. Protectionism: How Serious? IV. Cyber-terrorism: Strategy and Policy V. Sustainability: Post-Kyoto Challenges VI. Iraq: Role and Responsibilities in the Region VII. Afghanistan and Pakistan VIII. A New Order: The United States and the World IX. Lessons from a Crisis X. Challenge to Market Economies and Democracies XI. Russia and China: New Imperialisms XII. Current Affairs: How does Industry See the Future?
58	2010 (June 4–6)	Dolce Hotels and Resorts	Spain	Sitges	I. Current Events: North Korea, Iran and Non-Proliferation II. Global Cooling: Implications of Slow Economic Growth III. The Growing Influence of Cyber Technology IV. Is Financial Reform Progressing? V. US and European Fiscal and Financial Challenges VI. The European Union and the Crisis of the Euro VII. Promises of Medical Science VIII. Energy's Promises and Challenges IX. Security in a Proliferated World X. Social Networking: From the Obama Campaign to the Iranian Revolution XI. Europe-US: A New Approach XII. Pakistan, Afghanistan and the Region XIII. Can We Feed the World?
59	2011 (June 9–12)	Suvretta House	Switzerland	St. Moritz, Graubünden	I. The Middle East: What Does Democracy Mean? II. Emerging Economies: Roles and Responsibilities III. Economic and National Security in a Digital Age IV. Technological Innovation in Western Economies: Stagnation or Promise? V. The Appetite for Reform: Can Governments Deliver? VI. Switzerland: Can It Remain Successful in the Future? VII. European Union's Challenges VIII. A Sustainable Euro: Implications for European Economies IX. China's Domestic Challenges X. China’s Regional and Global Challenges XI. Connectivity and the Diffusion of Power XII. Current Conflict Areas XIII. Demographic Stresses
60	2012 (May 31 – June 3)	Westfields Marriott	United States	Chantilly, Virginia	I. The State of Trans-Atlantic Relations II. Is Vigorous Economic Growth Attainable? III. The Future of Democracy in the Developed World IV. The US Political Landscape V. The European Political Landscape VI. A Conversation on US Foreign Policy VII. The Politics and Geo-Politics of Energy VIII. Stability and Instability in the Middle East IX. Imbalances, Austerity and Growth X. Sustainability of the Euro and its Consequences XI. What Does Putin 2.0 Mean? XII. What Can the West Do about Iran? XIII. How Do Sovereign States Collaborate in Cyber Space? XIV. China's Economic and Political Outlook
61	2013 (June 8 – 9)	The Grove Hotel	United Kingdom	Watford	I. Jobs, Entitlements and Debt II. European Politics: Core Questions III. Can the US and Europe Grow Faster and Create Jobs? IV. Africa's Challenges V. Saudi Arabia VI. Dialogue with Prime Minister David Cameron VII. How Big Data is Changing Almost Everything VIII. Major Trends in Medical Research IX. Nationalism and Populism X. Online Education: Promise and Impacts XI. Cyberwarfare and the Proliferation of Asymmetric Threats XII. Is America Withdrawing from the World? XIII. Current Affairs: Syria
62	2014 (May 29 – June 1)	Copenhagen Marriott Hotel	Denmark	Copenhagen	I. Is the Economic Recovery Sustainable? II. Who will Pay for the Demographics? III. Does Privacy Exist? IV. How Special is the Relationship in Intelligence Sharing? V. Big Shifts in Technology and Jobs VI. The Future of Democracy and the Middle Class Trap VII. China's Political and Economic Outlook VIII. The New Architecture of the Middle East IX. Ukraine X. What Next for Europe? XI. Current Events
63	2015 (June 11–14)	Interalpen-Hotel Tyrol	Austria	Telfs	I. Artificial Intelligence II. Cybersecurity III. Chemical Weapons Threats IV. Current Economic Issues V. European Strategy VI. Globalisation VII. Greece VIII. Iran IX. Middle East X. NATO XI. Russia XII. Terrorism XIII. United Kingdom XIV. USA XV. US Elections
64	2016 (June 9–12)	Taschenbergpalais	Germany	Dresden	I. Current events II. China III. Europe: migration, growth, reform, vision, unity IV. Middle East V. Russia VI. US political landscape, economy: growth, debt, reform VII. Cyber security VIII. Geo-politics of energy and commodity prices IX. Precariat and middle class X. Technological innovation
65	2017 (June 1–4)	Westfields Marriott	United States	Chantilly, Virginia	I. The Trump Administration: A progress report II. Trans-Atlantic relations: options and scenarios III. The Trans-Atlantic defence alliance: bullets, bytes and bucks IV. The direction of the EU V. Can globalisation be slowed down? VI. Jobs, income and unrealised expectations VII. The war on information VIII. Why is populism growing? IX. Russia in the international order X. The Near East XI. Nuclear proliferation XII. China XIII. Current events
66	2018 (June 7–10)	NH Torino Lingotto Congress	Italy	Turin	I. Populism in Europe II. The inequality challenge III. The future of work IV. Artificial intelligence V. The US before midterms VI. Free trade VII. US world leadership VIII. Russia IX. Quantum computing X. Saudi Arabia and Iran XI. The “post-truth” world XII. Current events
67	2019 (May 30 – June 2)	Hotel Montreux Palace	Switzerland	Montreux	I. A Stable Strategic Order II. What Next for Europe? III. Climate Change and Sustainability IV. China V. Russia VI. The Future of Capitalism VII. Brexit VIII. The Ethics of Artificial Intelligence IX. The Weaponisation of Social Media X. The Importance of Space XI. Cyber Threats
The Meetings 2020 and 2021 had to be cancelled, due to travel and meeting restrictions.
68	2022 (June 2–5)	Mandarin Oriental	United States	Washington, D.C.	I. Geopolitical Realignments II. NATO III. China IV. Indo-Pacific Realignment V. Energy Security and Sustainability VI. Russia VII. Continuity of Government and the Economy VIII. Disruption of the Global Financial System IX. Disinformation X. Sino-US Tech Competition XI. Post Pandemic Health XII. Fragmentation of Democratic Societies XIII. Trade and Deglobalisation XIV. Ukraine
69	2023 (May 18–21)	Pestana Palace	Portugal	Lisbon	I. AI II. Banking System III. China IV. Energy Transition V. Europe VI. Fiscal Challenges VII. India VIII. Industrial Policy and Trade IX. NATO X. Russia XI. Transnational Threats XII. Ukraine XIII. US Leadership
70	2024 (May 30—June 2)	Eurostars Suites Mirasierra Hotel	Spain	Madrid	I. State of AI II. AI Safety III. Changing Faces of Biology IV. Climate V. Future of Warfare VI. Geopolitical Landscape VII. Europe's Economic Challenges VIII. US Economic Challenges IX. US Political Landscape X. Ukraine and the World XI. Middle East XII. China XIII. Russia
71	2025 (June 12–15)	Grand Hôtel	Sweden	Stockholm	I. Transatlantic Relationship II. Ukraine III. US Economy IV. Europe V. Middle East VI. Authoritarian Axis VII. Defence Innovation and Resilience VIII. AI, Deterrence and National Security IX. Proliferation X. Geopolitics of Energy and Critical Minerals XI. Depopulation and Migration
71	2026 (April 9–12)	Salamander Washington DC Hotel	United States	Washington, D.C.	I. AI II. Arctic Security III. China IV. Digital Finance V. Energy Diversification VI. Europe VII. Global Trade VIII. The Middle East IV. Russia X. Trans-Atlantic Defence-Industrial Relationship XI. Ukraine XII. USA XIII. Future of Warfare XIV. The West

- The 1976 Bilderberg conference was planned for April at The Homestead in Hot Springs, Virginia, United States. Due to the ongoing Lockheed scandal involving Prince Bernhard at the time, it was cancelled.
- The 2020 and 2021 Bilderberg conference had to be cancelled, due to travel and meeting restrictions.

== See also ==
- List of Bilderberg participants
