= 2025 Bilderberg Conference =

Europe–North America forum in Sweden

2025 Bilderberg Conference 71st Bilderberg Meeting
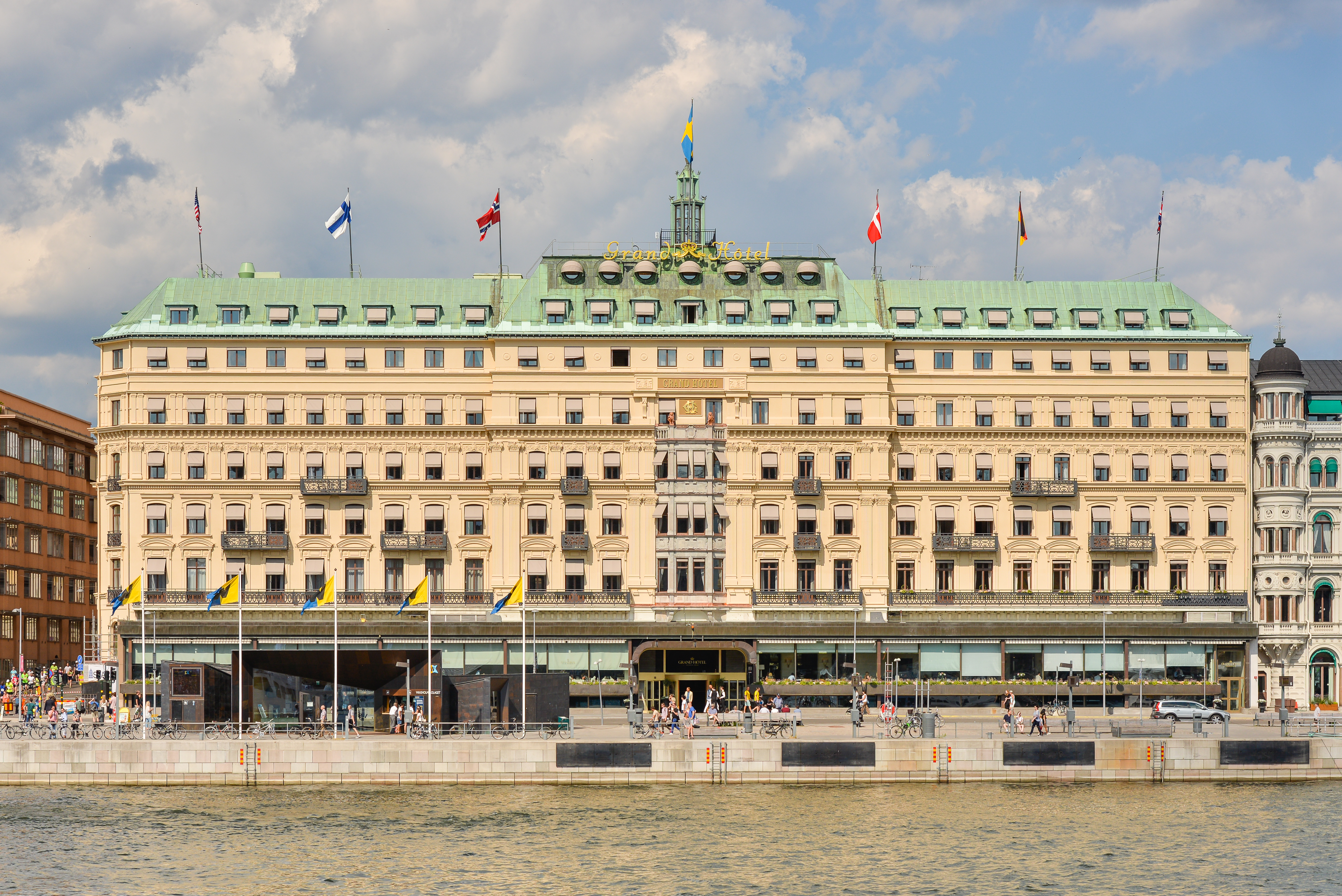
- Host country: Sweden
- Date: June 12–15, 2025
- Cities: Stockholm
- Venues: Grand Hôtel
- Participants: c. 121 from 23 countries
- Follows: 2024 Bilderberg Conference
- Precedes: 2026 Bilderberg Conference
- Website: bilderbergmeetings.org/meetings/meeting-2025/

The 2025 Bilderberg Conference was held between June 12–June 15, 2025 at the Grand Hôtel in Stockholm, Sweden. The 2025 meeting was the 71st edition of the event. A Bilderberg Group press release listed 121 participants from 23 countries.

Established in 1954 by Prince Bernhard of the Netherlands, Bilderberg conferences (or meetings) are an annual private gathering of the European and North American political and business elite. Events are attended by between 120 and 150 people each year invited by the Bilderberg Group's steering committee; including prominent politicians, CEOs, national security experts, academics and journalists.

Bilderberg conferences operate under the Chatham House Rule, meaning that participants are sworn to secrecy and cannot disclose the identity or affiliation of any particular speaker. As a result, media are not invited and delegates rarely speak about what was discussed.

Permits for two public demonstrations against the meeting were requested, one of which, a march from the Norrmalm Square to the Grand Hôtel, was planned for June 14.

== Agenda ==
The key topics for discussion were announced on the Bilderberg website shortly before the meeting. These topics included:

- Transatlantic Relationship
- Ukraine
- US Economy
- Europe
- Middle East
- Authoritarian Axis
- Defence Innovation and Resilience
- AI, Deterrence and National Security
- Proliferation
- Geopolitics of Energy and Critical Minerals
- Depopulation and Migration

== Participants ==
A list of 121 participants was published on the Bilderberg website. This list may not be complete, as a source connected to the Bilderberg group told The Daily Telegraph in 2013 that some attendees do not have their names publicized. Prime Minister of Sweden Ulf Kristersson attended the meeting despite his name not appearing on the published participant list.

=== Austria ===
- Kristina Hammer
- Gerhard Zeiler

=== Belgium ===
- Thomas Leysen
- Karel Verhoeven

=== Canada ===
- Murray Auchincloss
- François-Philippe Champagne
- Chrystia Freeland

=== Denmark ===
- Connie Hedegaard
- Robert Mærsk Uggla

=== European Union (International) ===
- Maria Luís Albuquerque
- Magnus Brunner
- Nadia Calviño
- Paschal Donohoe
- Wopke Hoekstra
- Michael McGrath
- Maroš Šefčovič
- Sophie Wilmès

=== Finland ===
- Jussi Herlin
- Erkki Liikanen
- Sanna Marin
- Alexander Stubb

=== France ===
- Gabriel Attal
- Patricia Barbizet
- Valérie Baudson
- Patrice Caine
- Henri de Castries
- Jean Lemierre
- Arthur Mensch
- Édouard Philippe
- Patrick Pouyanné
- Nicolas Roche
- Laurent Toulemon
- Luis Vassy

=== Germany ===
- Mathias Döpfner
- Julia Klöckner
- Katherina Reiche
- Gundbert Scherf
- Wolfgang Schmidt
- Christian Sewing

=== Greece ===
- Kyriakos Mitsotakis
- Dimitri Papalexopoulos

=== Ireland ===
- Jack Chambers
- Anne Heraty
- Michael O'Leary

=== Italy ===
- Marco Alverà
- Stefano Feltri
- Enrico Letta
- Mario Monti
- Valentino Valentini

=== NATO (International) ===
- Geoffrey van Leeuwen
- Mark Rutte

=== Netherlands ===
- Annemiek Fentener van Vlissingen
- Willem-Alexander of the Netherlands
- Kajsa Ollongren
- Rolly van Rappard
- David van Weel

=== Norway ===
- Børge Brende
- Øyvind Eriksen
- Birgitte Ringstad Vartdal
- Jens Stoltenberg

=== Other (International) ===
- Fatih Birol
- Alexander Gabuev
- Alexandra Prokopenko

=== Poland ===
- Rafal Brzoska
- Wojciech Kostrzewa
- Radoslaw Sikorski

=== Portugal ===
- José Manuel Barroso
- Leonor Beleza
- Diogo Salvi

=== Spain ===
- Diego del Alcázar Benjumea
- Ana Botín
- Pablo Hernández de Cos
- Pablo Isla

=== Sweden ===
- Magdalena Andersson
- Ebba Busch
- Daniel Ek
- Börje Ekholm
- Micael Johansson
- Conni Jonsson
- Martin Lundstedt
- Jacob Wallenberg
- Marcus Wallenberg

=== Switzerland ===
- André Kudelski
- Beatrice Weder di Mauro

=== Turkey ===
- Murat Özyeğin
- Mehmet Şimşek

=== Ukraine ===
- Dmytro Kuleba

=== United Kingdom ===
- Demis Hassabis
- Jeremy Hunt
- Zanny Minton Beddoes
- Gideon Rachman
- John Sawers
- Wes Streeting

=== United States ===
- Stacey Abrams
- Anne Applebaum
- James H. Baker
- Albert Bourla
- Jack Clark
- Kate Crawford
- Christopher Donahue
- Nicholas N. Eberstadt
- Jane Fraser
- Thomas L. Friedman
- Kevin Harrington
- Rebeccah Heinrichs
- Mellody Hobson
- Alex Karp
- Stephen Kotkin
- Michael Kratsios
- Henry R. Kravis
- Robert Lighthizer
- John Micklethwait
- Satya Nadella
- Samuel Paparo
- Brian Schimpf
- Eric E. Schmidt
- Jason Smith
- Mustafa Suleyman
- Lawrence Summers
- Peter Thiel
- Fareed Zakaria
