= 2023 Bilderberg Conference =

Europe–North America forum in Lisbon

2023 Bilderberg Conference 69th Bilderberg Meeting
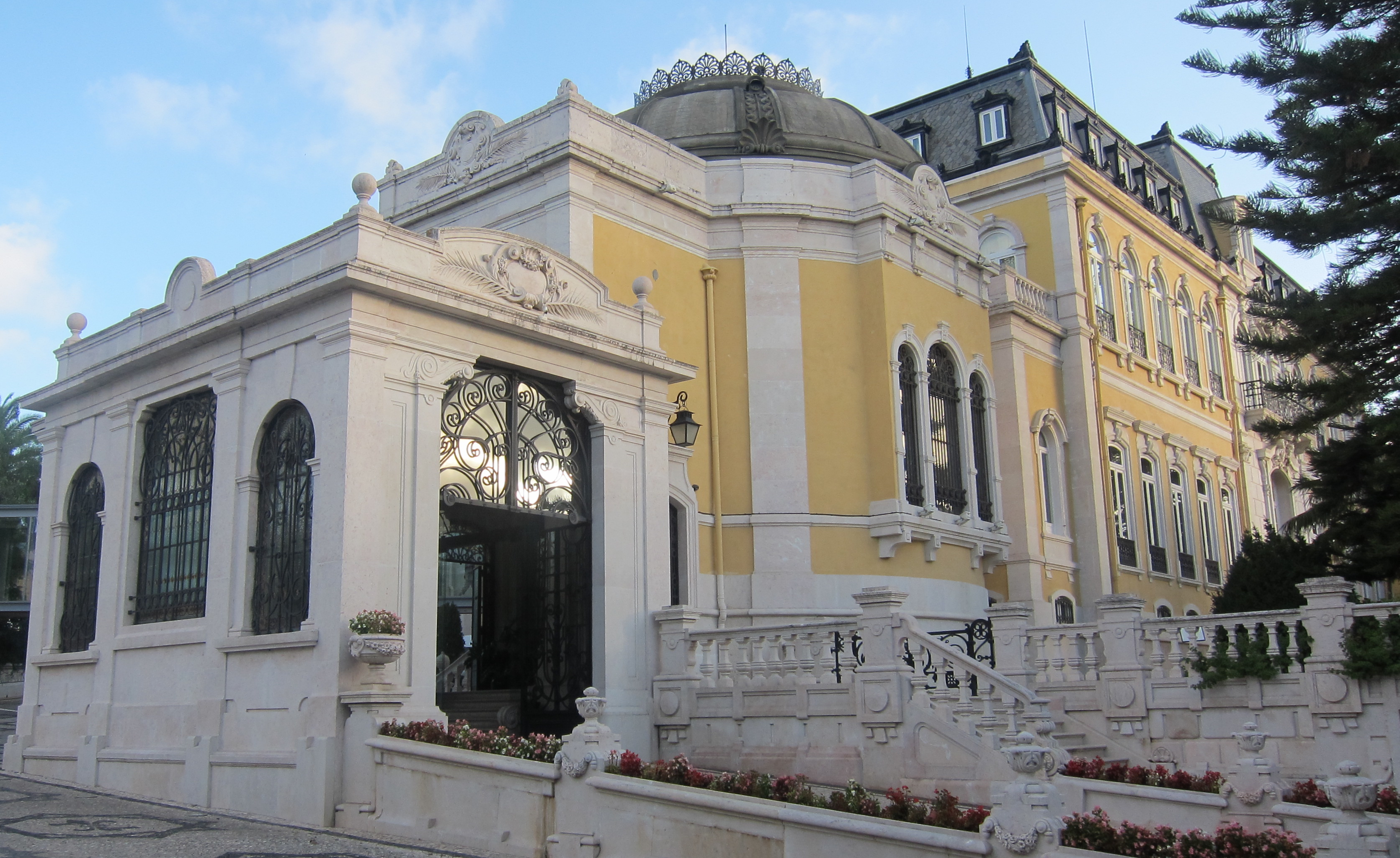
- Host country: Portugal
- Date: May 18–21, 2023
- Cities: Lisbon
- Venues: Pestana Palace
- Participants: c. 130 from 23 countries
- Follows: 2022 Bilderberg Conference
- Precedes: 2024 Bilderberg Conference
- Website: https://bilderbergmeetings.org/meetings/meeting-2023/

The 2023 Bilderberg Conference or Bilderberg Club was held between May 18–21, 2023 at the Pestana Palace hotel in Lisbon, Portugal. The 2023 meeting was the 69th edition of the event. A Bilderberg Group press release stated that there were approximately 130 participants from 23 countries.

Established in 1954 by Prince Bernhard of the Netherlands, Bilderberg conferences (or meetings) are an annual private gathering of the European and North American political and business elite. Events are attended by between 120 and 150 people each year invited by the Bilderberg Group's steering committee; including prominent politicians, CEOs, national security experts, academics and journalists.

The 2023 conference received some media attention due to the participation of several major players in the artificial intelligence space, such as OpenAI CEO Sam Altman, Microsoft CEO Satya Nadella, Google DeepMind chief Demis Hassabis and former Google CEO Eric Schmidt.

Bilderberg conferences operate under Chatham House Rule, meaning that participants are cannot disclose the identity or affiliation of any particular speaker. There were no press conferences during or after the event, as is customary. According to The Guardian, the paper's journalists were able to approach one high-ranking attendee, economist Victor Halberstadt, in a Lisbon pharmacy, but he denied his identity before jumping into a car and heading back to his hotel.

== Agenda ==
The key topics for discussion at the 2023 Bilderberg Conference were announced on the Bilderberg website shortly before the meeting. These topics included:

- AI
- Banking system
- China
- Energy transition
- Europe
- Fiscal challenges
- India
- Industrial policy and trade
- NATO
- Russia
- Transnational threats
- Ukraine

== Participants ==
A list of 128 participants was published on the Bilderberg website. This list may not be complete, as a source connected to the Bilderberg group told The Daily Telegraph in 2013 that some attendees do not have their names publicized. Oscar Stenström, Sweden’s chief negotiator for NATO membership, was reported to have been seen at the venue despite his name not being on the list.

Austria

- Martina Salomon
- Alexander Schallenberg

Belgium

- Koenraad Debackere
- Thomas Leysen

Canada

- Ajay Agrawal
- Mark Carney
- Chrystia Freeland
- Deborah Orida

Denmark

- Mette Frederiksen
- Connie Hedegaard
- Kristian Jensen

European Union (International)

- Josep Borrell
- Paschal Donohoe
- Paolo Gentiloni
- Roberta Metsola
- Didier Reynders

Finland

- Henrik Ehrnrooth
- Erkki Liikanen
- Sanna Marin

France

- Gabriel Attal
- Patricia Barbizet
- Valérie Baudson
- Clément Beaune
- Thomas Buberl
- Henri de Castries
- Bernard Émié
- Antoine Gosset-Grainville
- Édouard Philippe
- Patrick Pouyanné

Germany

- Paul M. Achleitner
- Martin Brudermüller
- Mathias Döpfner
- Bélen Garijo
- Anton Hofreiter
- Norbert Röttgen
- Wolfgang Schmidt

Greece

- Nicky Goulimis
- Dimitri Papalexopoulos (treasurer)
- Eftichios Vassilakis

Ireland

- Thomas Byrne
- Michael O'Leary

Italy

- Marco Alverà
- Giuliano da Empoli
- Lilli Gruber

NATO (International)

- Christopher Cavoli
- Jens Stoltenberg

Netherlands

- Ben van Beurden
- Dolf van den Brink
- Victor Halberstadt
- Sigrid Kaag
- Rolly van Rappard
- Mark Rutte
- Peter Wennink

Norway

- Kjerstin Braathen
- Børge Brende
- Øyvind Eriksen

Other (International)

- Andrei Kolesnikov
- Arvind Subramanian

Poland

- Kasia Kieli
- Wojciech Kostrzewa
- Radoslaw Sikorski

Portugal

- José Luís Arnaut
- Francisco Pinto Balsemão
- José Manuel Barroso
- Duarte Moreira
- Nuno Sebastião
- Filipe Silva
- Miguel Stilwell de Andrade

Spain

- José Manuel Albares
- Ana P. Botín
- José Creuheras
- José M. Entrecanales
- Esteban González Pons
- Pedro J. Ramírez

Sweden

- Magdalena Andersson
- Anna Borg
- Marcus Wallenberg

Switzerland

- Ignazio Cassis
- Madeleine von Holzen
- André Kudelski

Turkey

- Mehmet Fatih Ceylan
- Refet Gürkaynak
- Ömer Koç
- Soli Özel
- Barçin Yinanç

Ukraine

- Dmytro Kuleba

United Kingdom

- Jeremy Fleming
- Demis Hassabis
- Shashank Joshi
- David Lammy
- Bernard Looney
- Zanny Minton Beddoes
- Dambisa Moyo
- Gideon Rachman
- John Sawers
- Tom Tugendhat
- Shriti Vadera
- Yuan Yang

United States

- Stacey Abrams
- Sam Altman
- Anne Applebaum
- Sally Benson
- Albert Bourla
- Tarun Chhabra
- Brian Deese
- Jen Easterly
- Elizabeth Economy
- Niall Ferguson
- Kenneth Griffin
- Avril D. Haines
- Alex Karp
- Garry Kasparov
- Henry A. Kissinger
- Stephen Kotkin
- Henry R. Kravis
- Marie-Josée Kravis
- John Micklethwait
- Craig J. Mundie
- Satya Nadella
- Matthew Pottinger
- Nadia Schadlow
- Eric E. Schmidt
- Ashley J. Tellis
- Peter Thiel
- Jing Tsu
- John Waldron
- Thomas Wright
- Daniel Yergin
