= Pestana Palace =

The Pestana Palace Hotel Lisbon
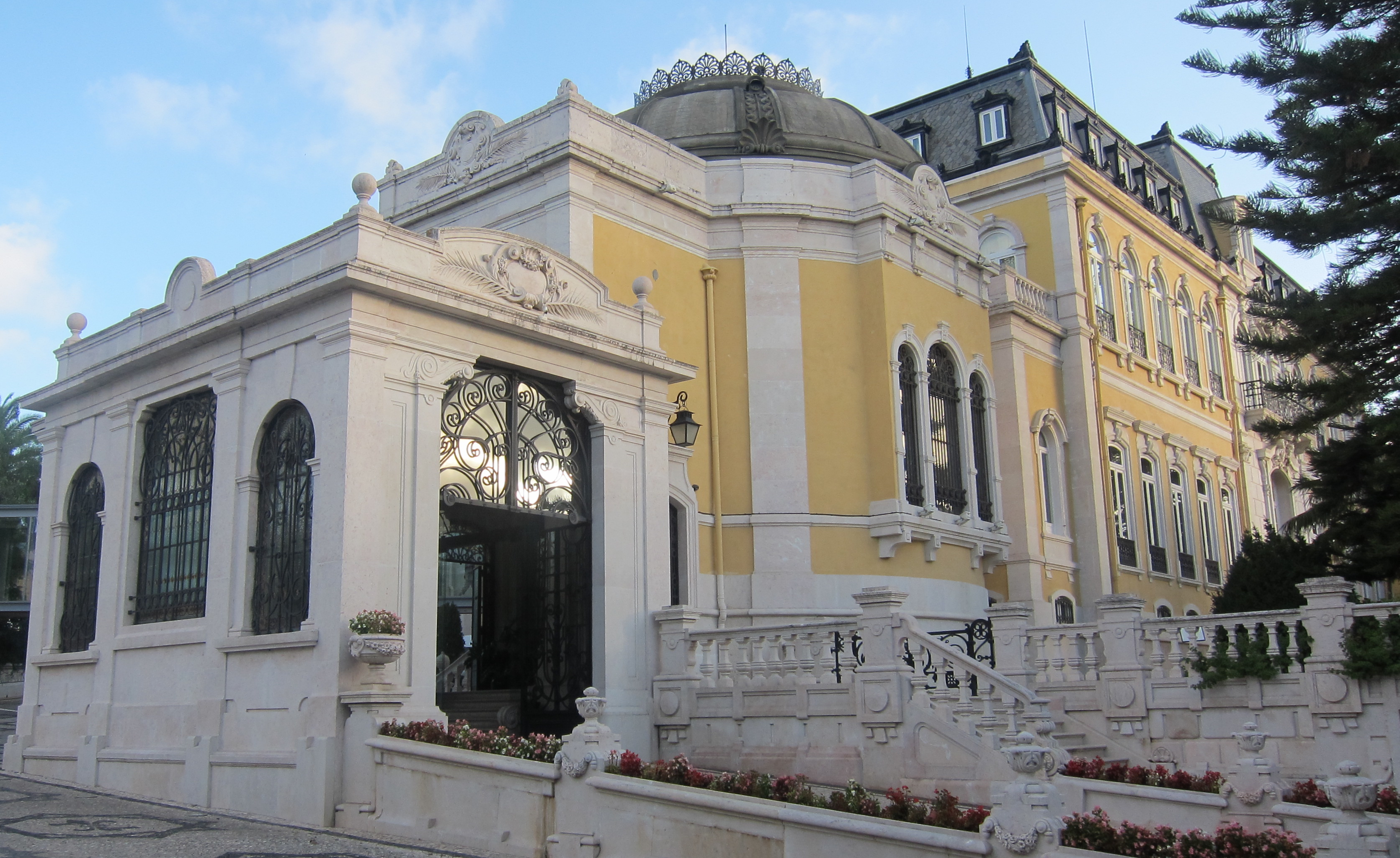
- Interactive map of the The Pestana Palace Hotel Lisbon area
- Former names: Palácio Vale Flor
- Hotel chain: Pestana Group

General information
- Type: Luxury hotel
- Location: Rua Jau 54, Lisbon, Portugal
- Groundbreaking: 1880
- Construction started: 1904

Website
- www.pestanapalacelisbon.com

Pestana Palace is a luxury hotel in Lisbon, Portugal, in the Alcântara district. Housed in the historic Palácio Vale Flor, Pestana Palace is the flagship luxury hotel of the Pestana Group, one of Portugal's premier hotel groups. It is a member of The Leading Hotels of the World.

The hotel hosted the 2023 Bilderberg Conference between May 18–21.

== History ==
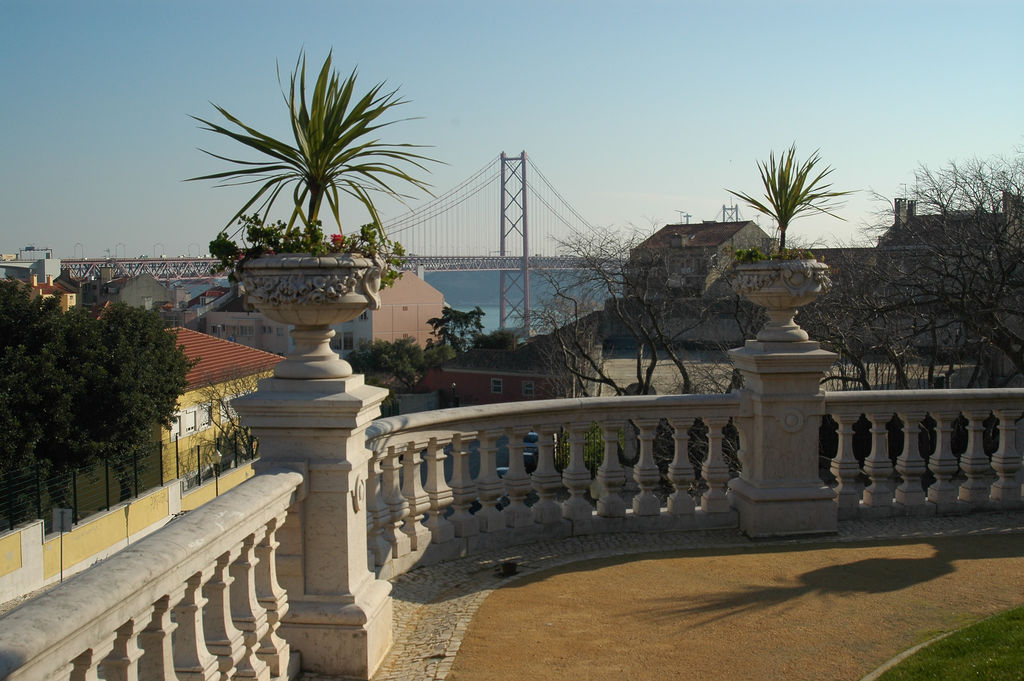
View of the Tagus River and the 25 de Abril Bridge from the palace.

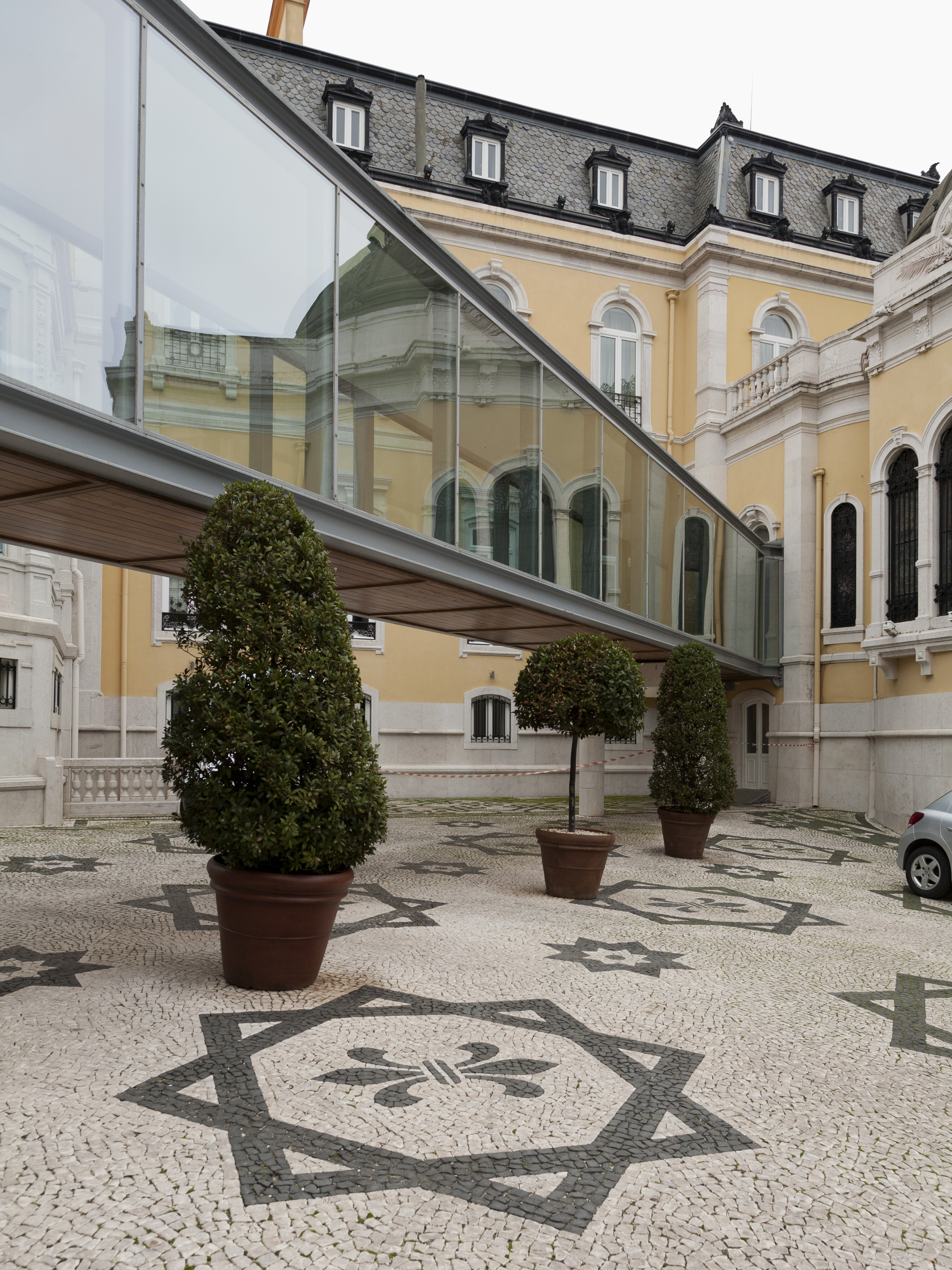
Patio showing the 20th-century renovation by architect Manuel Tainha.

Ground was broken on the Palácio Vale Flor at the end of the 19th century, when José Luís Constantino Dias, 1st Marquis of Vale Flor. The Marquis of Vale Flor had made a fortune in coffee plantations on Portuguese colonies of São Tomé and Príncipe, islands in the Gulf of Guinea in Africa, and had acquired lands in Alcântara, with the intention to build a Lisbon residence.

The palace was acquired in 1992 by the Pestana Group, with the intention of transforming the formerly private aristocratic residence into the group's flagship luxury hotel. The group's initial plan's were stalled until 1995, when they were approved by the Portuguese Direction-General for Cultural Heritage. The ensuing project, refurbishing the palace and expanding its annexes, was executed by architect Manuel Tainha and was completed in 1997.

It was classified as a National Monument in 1997.

== Architecture ==
The initial design of the palace was done by Italian architect Nicola Bigaglia, who led works on the project until 1908, when prominent Portuguese architect José Ferreira da Costa took over the project until its completion in 1910. Numerous details throughout the palace are attributed to famed architect Miguel Ventura Terra.

After the palace's construction, an extensive interior decoration campaign was executed between 1910 and 1915, under the auspices of designers Constantino Fernandes, Carlos Reis e Eugénio Cotrim.
