= The King and Prince Beach & Golf Resort =

Historic hotel and resort in the US

- King and Prince Hotel
- U.S. National Register of Historic Places
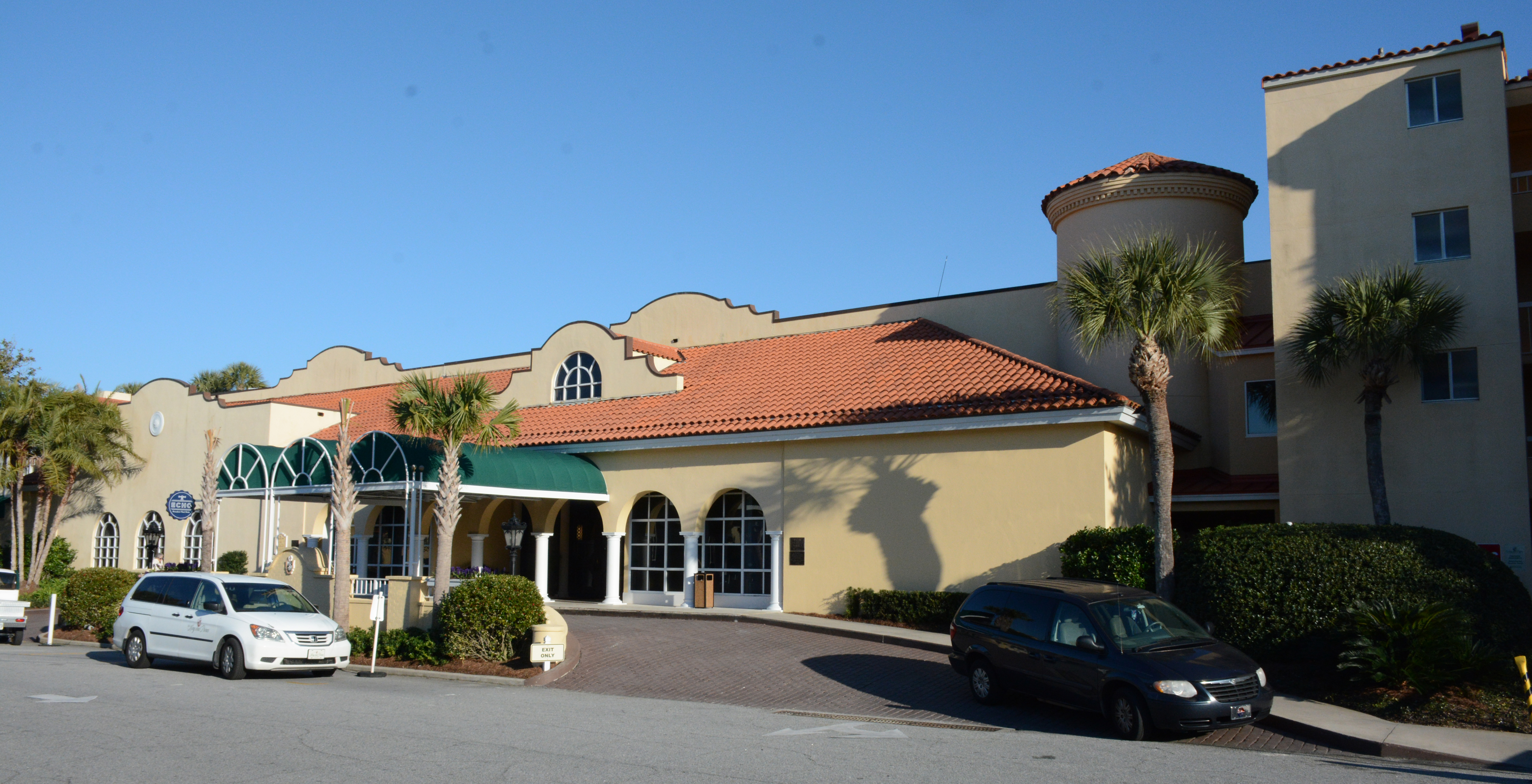
- Main entrance

- Location within Georgia Location within the United States
- Location: 201 Arnold Rd., St. Simons Island, Georgia
- Coordinates: 31.13921°N 81.37902°W
- Built: 1941
- Architect: Davis, Felton; Miller, Laurance
- Architectural style: Mission/Spanish Revival
- NRHP reference No.: 04001465
- Added to NRHP: January 12, 2005

The King and Prince Beach & Golf Resort is a resort located on St. Simons Island in the U.S. state of Georgia.

== History ==
The hotel began in 1935 as the King and Prince Beach Club, a seaside dance club built by Morgan T. Wynne and Franklin J. Horne. It was noted for its big band entertainment and dancing. After two fires, the club was rebuilt and opened on July 2, 1941, as the King and Prince Hotel. Used as a training facility and radar station by the Navy during World War II, the island resort reopened its doors to the public in 1947. In 1972 and 1982 the resort underwent substantial building renovations and expansions.

The King and Prince was the host of the 1957 Bilderberg Meeting. The King and Prince Beach and Golf Resort was made a member of Historic Hotels of America in 1996, the official program of the National Trust for Historic Preservation. It was listed on the National Register of Historic Places in 2005.

== Photos ==
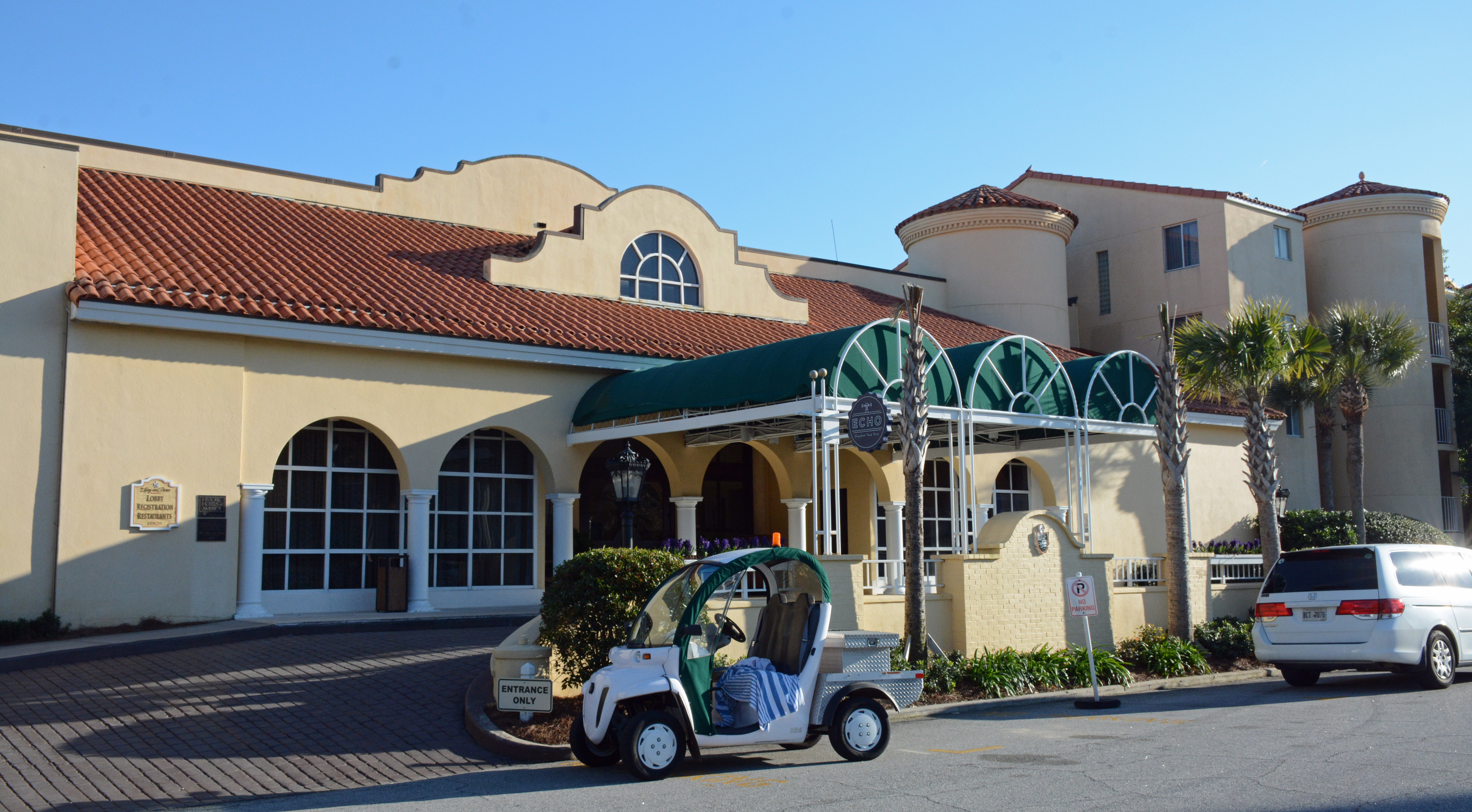
Main entrance

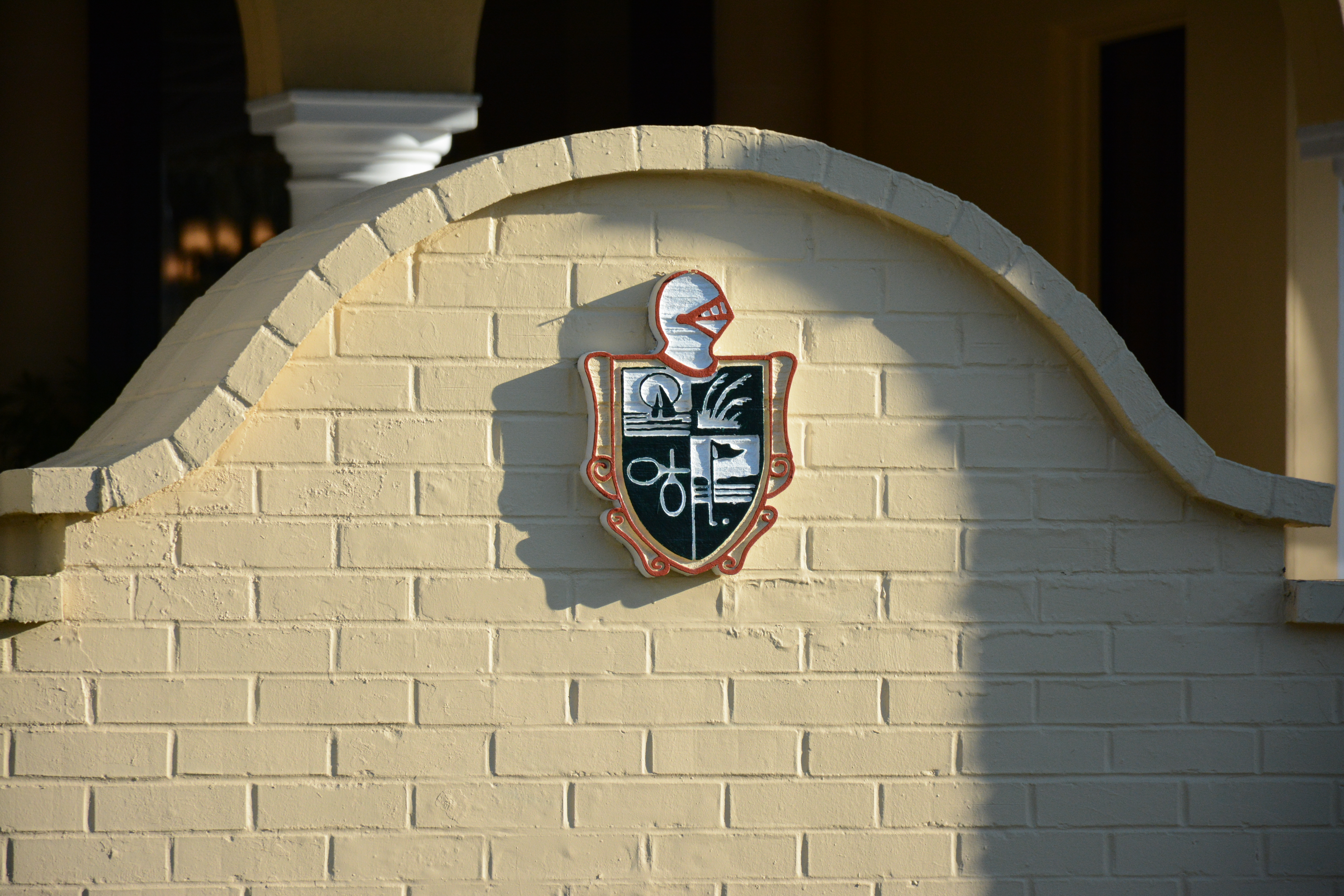
Logo

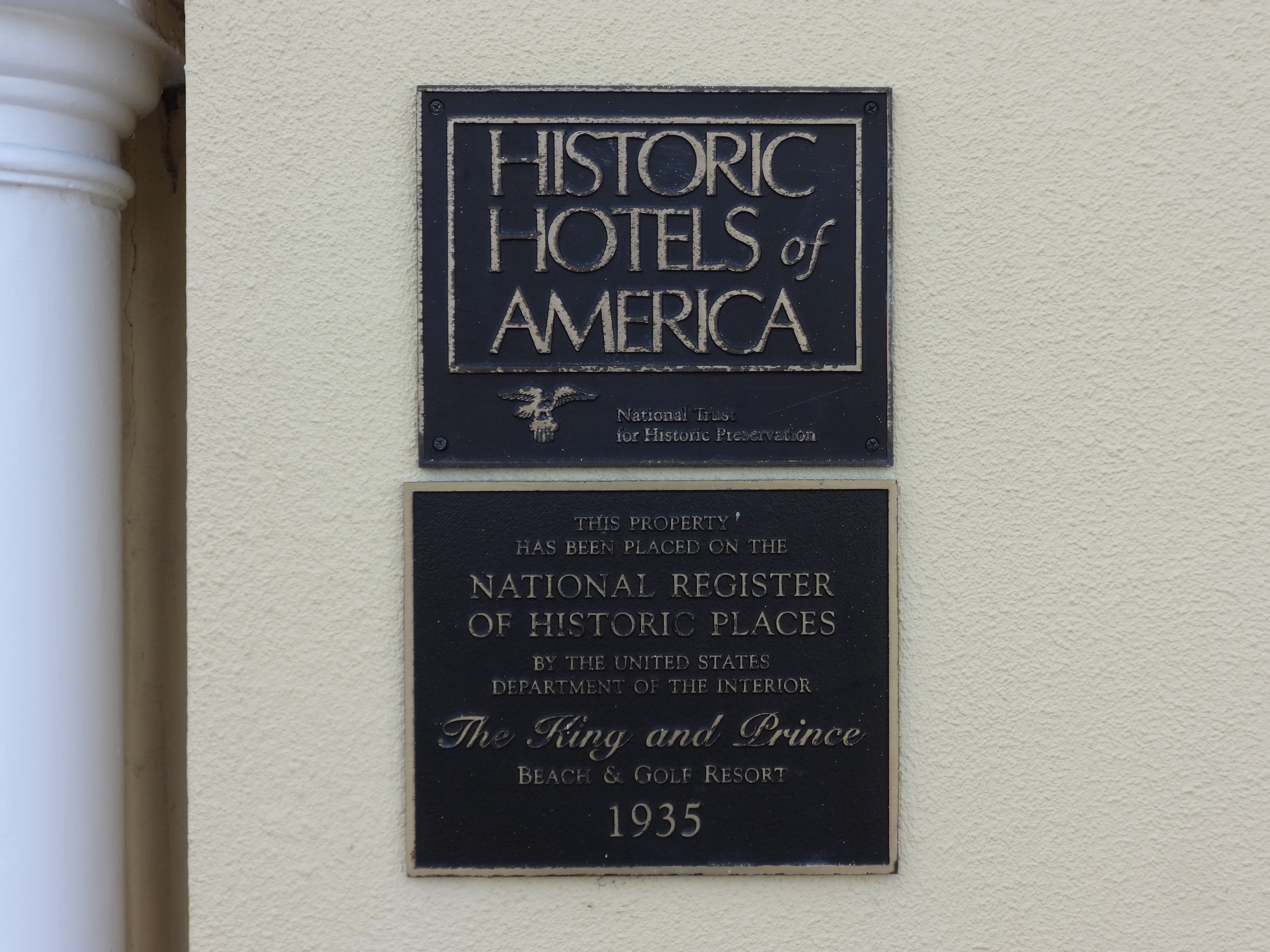
Historic Hotels of America plaque and National Register of Historic Places plaque

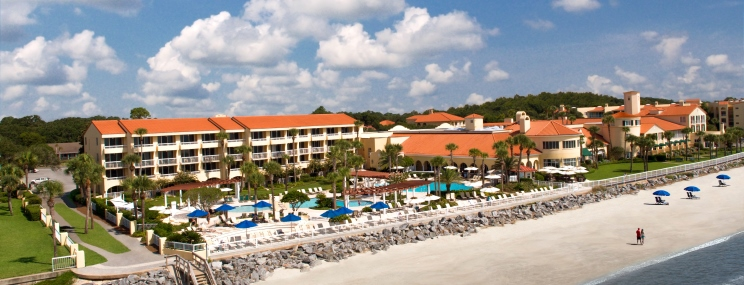
Aerial view
