= Faryar Shirzad =

US presidential advisor (born 1965)

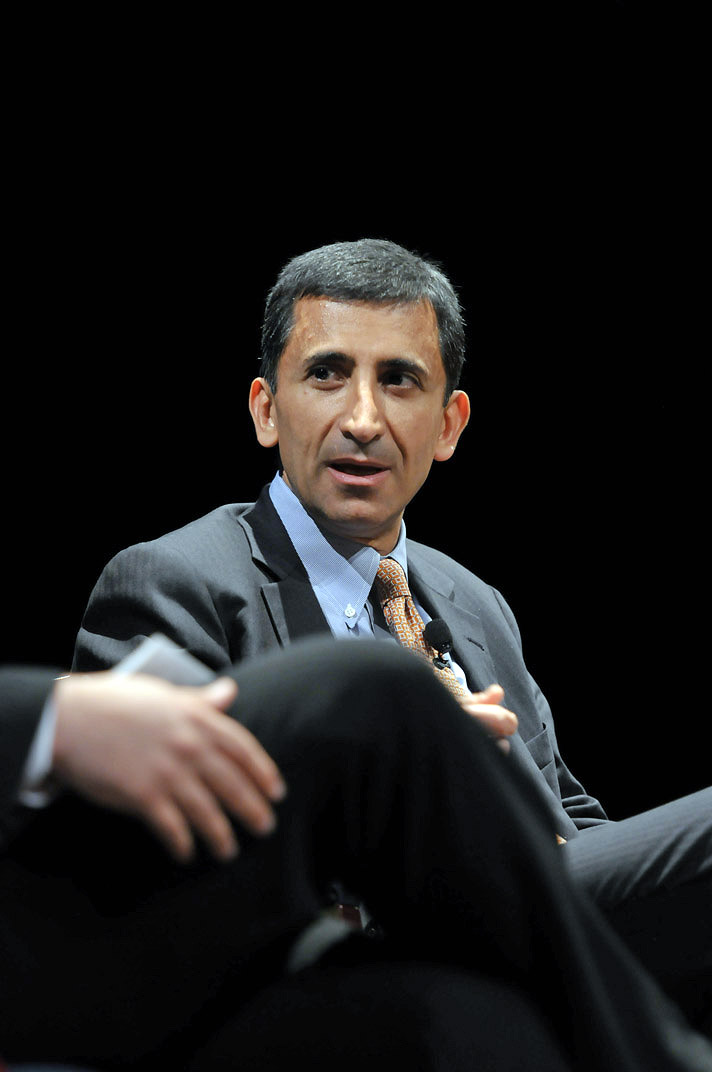
Faryar Shirzad at a PAAIA event

Faryar Shirzad (in Persian: فریار شیرزاد); born 1965 in London formerly served on the staff of the National Security Council at the White House from March 2003 through August 2006, first as a special assistant to President George W. Bush for International Economic Affairs, and then as deputy assistant to the President and deputy national security advisor for International Economic Affairs. In those roles, Shirzad was responsible for advising the President, the National Security Advisor and the Director of the National Economic Council on all international economic policy matters, including trade, investment, finance, development, energy and environment. He also served as the President's personal representative to the G-8 (the “G8 Sherpa”), and led the preparations for the President's participation in other international economic summits, such as the U.S.-E.U. Summit, the Asia Pacific Economic Cooperation Forum and the Summit of the Americas.

Prior to his time at the White House, Shirzad was assistant secretary for Import Administration at the U.S. Department of Commerce, where he administered the U.S. trade remedy laws, and was responsible for negotiating agreements in a number industry sectors around the globe. Prior to that, he was the trade policy coordinator on the Bush-Cheney Transition Team. He began his career in public service as international trade counsel on the majority staff of the U.S. Senate Committee on Finance under Chairman William V. Roth (R-DE). He previously practiced law in Washington, DC at Skadden, Arps, Slate, Meagher & Flom and Robins, Kaplan, Miller & Ciresi, where he advised clients on international trade and regulatory matters.

In his role at the White House, he was President Bush's representative to the G-8 ("G-8 Sherpa"). Previous positions held by Faryar include Assistant Secretary for Import Administration, U.S. Department of Commerce; International Trade Counsel, U.S. Senate Finance Committee; and Associate Attorney at the International Trade Group at Skadden, Arps, Slate, Meagher & Flom.

Born to Iranian parents in London, Faryar has a Bachelor of Science degree in finance from the University of Maryland; a Master of Public Policy from the John F. Kennedy School of Government, Harvard University; and a law degree from the University of Virginia School of Law.

Shirzad joined Goldman, Sachs & Co. in August 2006 and is a managing director, and Global Head of Government Affairs. Shirzad recently received the Ellis Island Medal of Honor.

In 2013, Shirzad was a signatory to an amicus curiae brief submitted to the Supreme Court in support of same-sex marriage during the Hollingsworth v. Perry case.

== See also ==
- List of Iranian Americans
- Iranian American
