= Grace Reksten Skaugen =

Norwegian chairperson

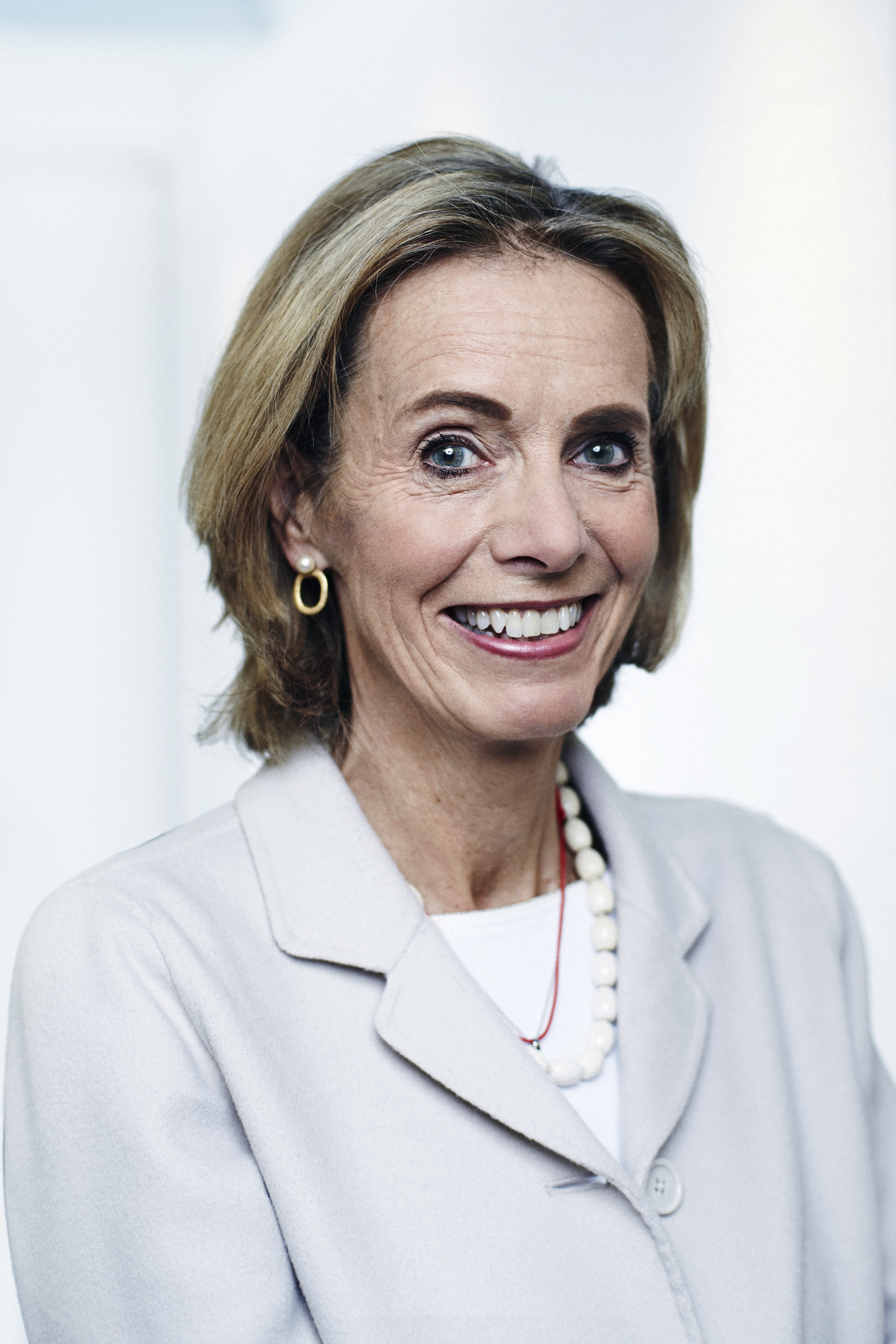
- Born: November, 1953
- Occupations: Chairperson of the Norwegian Institute of Directors and deputy chairperson of Statoil.; Member of the International Institute for Strategic Studies council.

Grace Reksten Skaugen (born November 1953) is the chairperson of the Norwegian Institute of Directors and deputy chairperson of Statoil. She is a member of the council of the International Institute for Strategic Studies.

== Early life and education ==
Skaugen was born in November 1953 into one of Norway’s well-known shipping families; she is the youngest child of Norwegian shipowner Hilmar Reksten. Her father was a prominent and controversial figure in Norwegian maritime business.

After finishing secondary school (“gymnas”), she moved to London to study physics, going on to pursue advanced academic work rather than entering the family business immediately.

She completed a Ph.D. in laser physics at Imperial College London, and later also earned an MBA from BI Norwegian Business School. During the early part of her career, she also worked in research at Columbia University in New York.

Part of her early adulthood involved dealing with the aftermath of her father’s business collapse and legal disputes (the Reksten shipping interests were involved in extensive litigation after Hilmar Reksten’s death). Grace herself described spending significant time after completing her doctorate managing estates and related matters with her family’s legal estate, culminating in a settlement in 1990.

In writing about her own background, she has emphasized that she is not simply her "father’s daughter,” but has worked to build her own career in science, finance, and business leadership.

== Career and board positions ==
Grace Reksten Skaugen has extensive experience across industry, finance, and advisory roles, with significant leadership positions spanning several decades.

== Association with Jeffrey Epstein ==
Skaugen was mentioned in the Epstein files, where it was revealed that she visited Jeffrey Epstein in his New York estate in September 2013. At the time, Reksten Skaugen was a board member of Statoil (now Equinor) and the food giant Orkla. Afterwards, she thanked Jeffrey Epstein for the stay. She stated that she had heard about the prison sentence, but contended she "unfortunately" had not investigated what he had been convicted of. The visit took place at the invitation of Terje Rød-Larsen, and she discussed theoretical financial issues with Epstein.

Five years later, in 2018, her husband sold an apartment for half its market value to Terje Rød-Larsen after having been blackmailed in Paris by Jeffrey Epstein.
