= Grand Hotel Saltsjöbaden =

Hotel in Saltsjöbaden, Sweden

Coordinates: 59.2777°N 18.3120°E

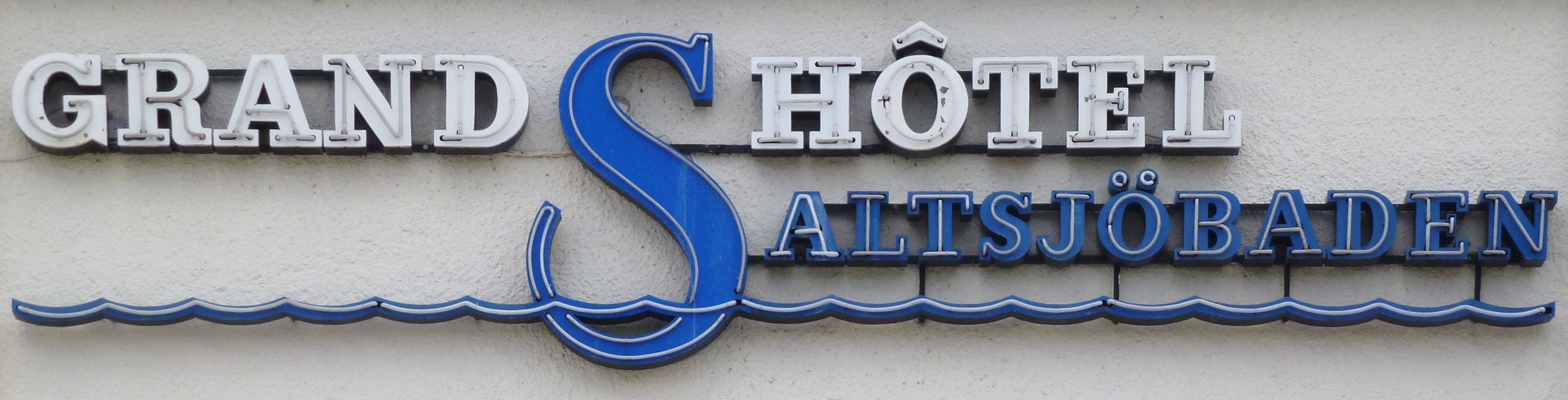

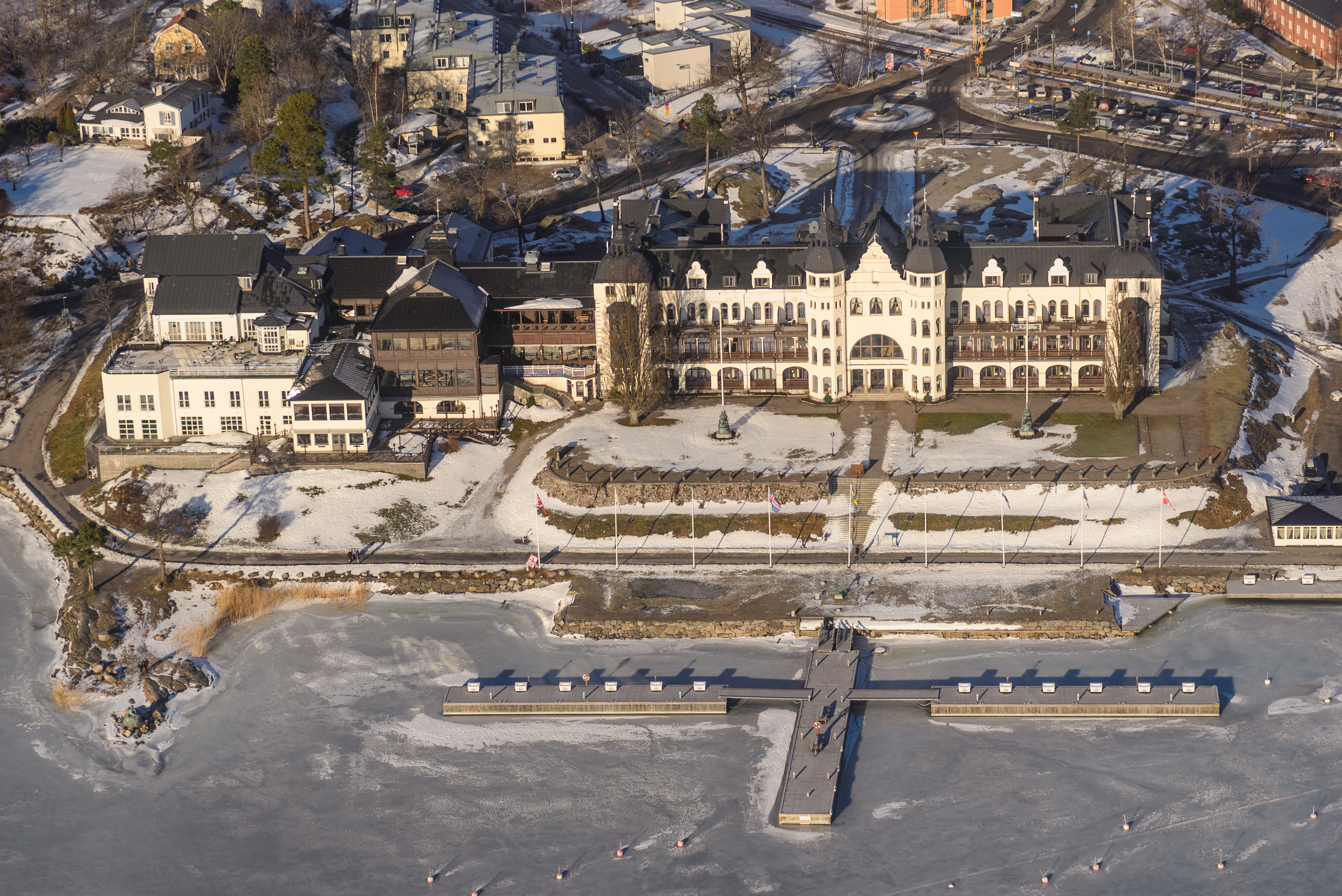
- Grand Hotel Saltsjöbaden in February 2013
- Interactive map of the Grand Hotel Saltsjöbaden area

General information
- Location: Saltsjöbaden, Sweden
- Opened: 1893

The Grand Hotel Saltsjöbaden is a hotel in Saltsjöbaden, Sweden. Built on the initiative of Knut Agathon Wallenberg, it was opened in 1893 by King Oscar II of Sweden. The hotel was owned by the Wallenberg family until 1999, when it was purchased by Nordisk Renting who sold it in 2002 to Danish-Egyptian hotel owner Enan Galaly's chain Helnan Hotels. On 20 December 1938, the Saltsjöbaden Agreement was signed at the hotel. It hosted three Bilderberg meetings, in 1962, 1973, and 1984.
