= The Potomac Hotel =

Luxury hotel in Washington, D.C., US

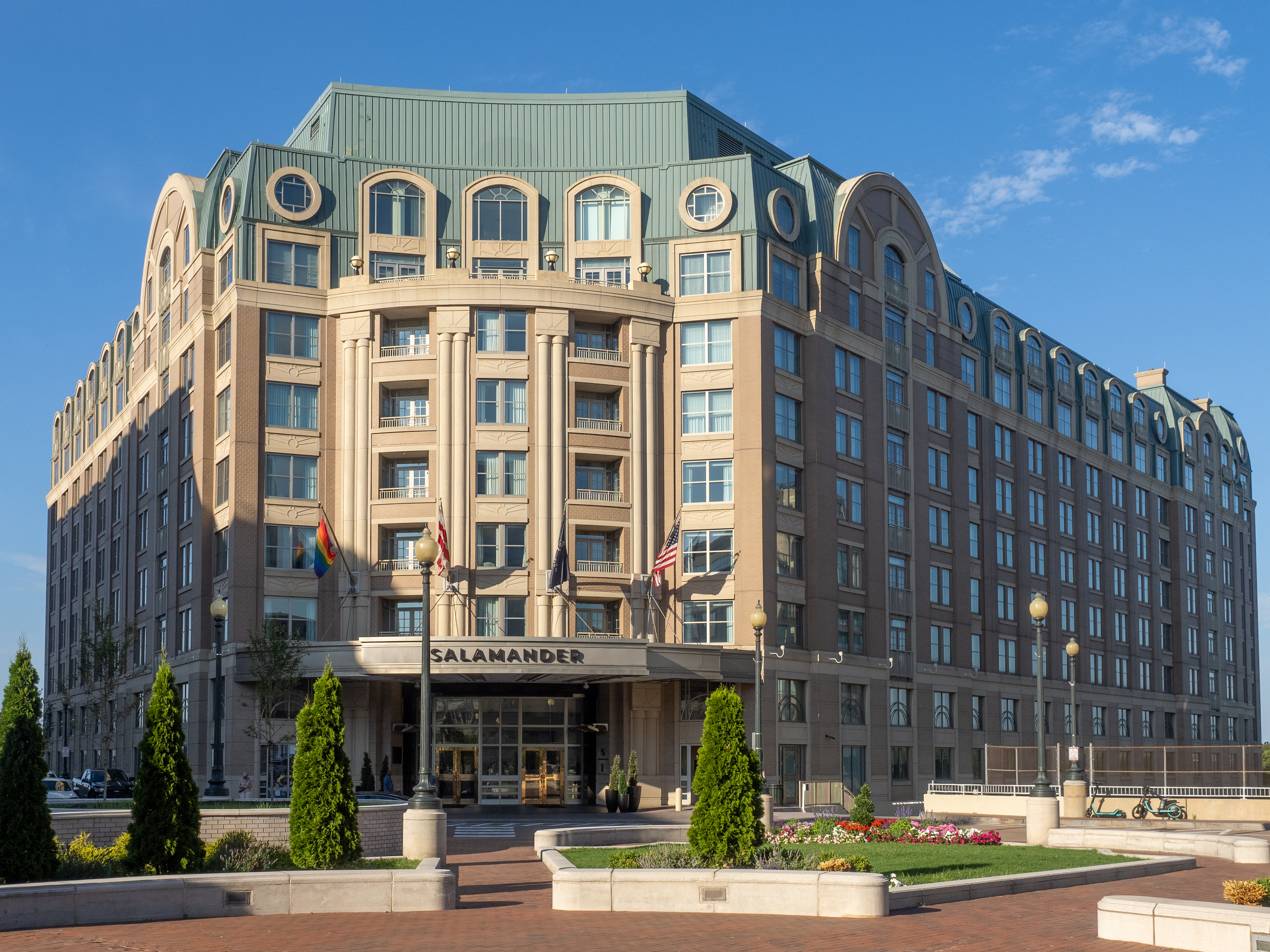

General information
- Location: United States, Washington, D.C.
- Coordinates: 38.883621°N 77.030367°W
- Opening: May 16, 2004
- Cost: $155 million
- Owner: Henderson Park
- Operator: Pyramid Global Hospitality

Height
- Height: 130 feet (40 m)

Technical details
- Floor count: 11

Design and construction
- Architect: Mark Boekenheide of Brennan Beer Gorman Monk Architects
- Developer: Mandarin Oriental Hotel Group, Lano International Inc., and Armada Hoffler Construction Co.

Other information
- Number of rooms: 373 rooms (inclusive of suites)
- Number of suites: 51
- Number of restaurants: 0
- Number of bars: 1

The Potomac Hotel (formerly Salamander Washington DC) is a luxury Postmodernist-style hotel located at 1330 Maryland Ave SW, Washington, D.C. The hotel is an AAA-rated four diamond and Forbes Travel Guide rated four stars. It opened in 2004 as the Mandarin Oriental Washington, D.C..

== History ==
=== Mandarin Oriental ===
In the 1970s, most of the Southwest quadrant of Washington, D.C., was completely razed in a massive urban renewal effort. One of the last large parcels to be redeveloped was the area bounded by 12th Street SW, D Street SW, Maine Avenue SW, and 14th Street SW. More than a decade passed, as the city sought a developer with sufficient financial resources to develop the tract. In 1985, a team led by Republic Properties finally was chosen by the city to develop what became known as The Portals, four massive office buildings constructed around an extension of Maryland Avenue SW and a new traffic circle. But the developers ran into problems obtaining financing for the entire project, and sold the southeastern portion of the site. The new development team consisted of Mandarin Oriental Hotel Group, Lano International Inc., and Armada Hoffler Construction Co.

In early 2000, Mandarin Oriental Hotels proposed building a $142 million, 400-room hotel on the site. The hotel included 33,000 square feet (3,100 m^{2}) of meeting space, 6,500 square feet (600 m^{2}) of retail space, several restaurants, and a fitness center. Mandarin Oriental Hotels sought major tax breaks and financing from the District of Columbia to develop the hotel. Initially, they sought $22 million in tax increment financing (TIF). Under this scheme, the city would sell 20-year bonds worth $22 million, and would turn 75 percent of the money over to the developers. (Note: The remaining funds would cover the cost of the bond sales, and be used as a reserve in case the hotel went bankrupt and failed to pay the anticipated taxes.) The hotel would pay the usual property and sales taxes, estimated to be $220 million over the life of the bonds. But due to $20 million in increased costs, Mandarin Oriental Hotels was unable to secure all the private financing it needed. The hotel chain returned to the city and asked for $46 million in TIF bonds as well as a $6 million property tax break. The city approved the TIF bonds, but not the property tax reduction.

A year passed, and the city was unable to sell the bonds for the TIF package. The early 2000s recession left bond buyers unsure that the hotel would be able to generate enough tax revenue to cover the bond repayments. The significant economic downturn that occurred after the September 11 attacks in 2001 worsened the city's ability to sell bonds. To correct the problem, the D.C. City Council adopted new legislation to geographically widen the area the TIF bonds drew revenue from. The new TIF district included the neighborhoods of Downtown, Dupont Circle, Foggy Bottom, Logan Circle, and Shaw in addition to Southwest.

But with the post-9/11 economic downturn continuing, the City Council hesitated in approving the package. Mandarin Oriental officials had added a 8,300-square-foot (770 m^{2}) ballroom, a swimming pool, and a spa to the hotel's amenities. Although Mandarin Oriental obtained $85 million in financing from a banking syndicate and Mandarin International, Lano International, and Armada Hoffler Construction put in $19 million of their own money, the $46 million in TIF money was not enough to allow construction on the hotel to move forward. Mandarin Oriental officials came back to the city and asked for a $4 million property tax deferral, but the City Council did not have the votes to pass the legislation. Although the cost of the hotel rose to $155 million, in April 2002 Mandarin Oriental Hotel Group said it would proceed with the hotel's construction. By this time, the project was reported by The Washington Post to include just two restaurants and an art gallery in addition to the previously announced meeting space, fitness center, ballroom, pool, and spa. The city never approved the $4 million in property tax deferral, which required the three investors to add another $4 million of their own money to get the project moving.

The Mandarin Oriental Washington, D.C. opened on March 22, 2004.

The hotel was the venue of the 2022 Bilderberg Conference between June 2–5, during which time it was fully booked out and cordoned off with barricades.

=== Salamander Hotels ===
On September 8, 2022, the hotel was sold by Mandarin Oriental Hotel Group for $139 million to private equity real estate manager Henderson Park, and Middleburg, Virginia-based Salamander Hotels & Resorts assumed management of the hotel, which was renamed Salamander Washington DC on September 13, 2022. Salamander and its founder and CEO, Sheila Johnson, had weighed other prospective deals in the District including at City Ridge, the redevelopment of Fannie Mae's former headquarters.

=== The Potomac Hotel ===
On August 5, 2026, Pyramid Global Hospitality assumed management of the hotel, and it was renamed The Potomac Hotel, operating as part of the Autograph Collection division of the Marriott International system.

== Design ==
The hotel features a curving Mansard roof punctuated at points by windows which are either round or arched, and often protected by a pediment. The facade is light tan brick, with double-hung windows in a repetitive pattern piercing the facade. Brennan Beer Gorman Monk also oversaw the interior design. The hotel's vast lobby is lined with marble, and public hallways feature rocking chairs and sofas.

An abandoned railroad bridge to the west of the hotel was converted into a pedestrian bridge and pathway, which connects the hotel and The Portals to the Tidal Basin waterfront.

Benjamin Forgey, the architectural critic at The Washington Post, was unimpressed by the hotel's architecture. He called it lacking in freshness, "dry, [a] by-the-numbers take on an old tradition. It's a sort of habit." Architect Mark Boekenheide said his goal was to make the hotel look significantly different from the office buildings of The Portals (designed by local architect Arthur Cotton Moore), and yet compatible with them. He succeeded, Forgey agreed, but at a price: The hotel was too reminiscent of the 1986 additions to the Willard InterContinental Washington, which left the Mandarin Oriental looking dated. "A much bolder gesture was called for to connect the new building to the waterfront," Forgey concluded. "And that's the story in a nutshell. The architecture of this prominent building needed more boldness and sophistication. It didn't have to be a Willard-come-lately."

== Location ==
The hotel is near the National Mall and Smithsonian Institution museums, and overlooked the Tidal Basin. The Washington Post calls the hotel's location "unconventional". The 373-room hotel is located near downtown Washington, although to reach Capitol Hill guests would need a taxicab or automobile. Guests in rooms on the upper levels have views of the city and its monuments, but the surrounding neighborhood consisted primarily of railroad tracks, freeways, and office buildings.

== Rating ==
The AAA gave the hotel four diamonds out of five in 2004. The hotel has maintained that rating every year, and received four diamonds again in 2016. Forbes Travel Guide (formerly known as Mobil Guide) awarded the hotel four out of five stars in 2016. Forbes also gave the Mandarin Oriental's spa four out of five stars in 2016.

== Shooting incident ==
On July 21, 2022, Shanteari Weems shot her husband James Weems Jr. on the eight floor of the hotel. They had argued at the hotel about accusations he had abused children at the Lil Kidz Kastle day care in Baltimore, which was owned by Mrs. Weems. Both Shanteari and James Weems, a former Baltimore City police officer, were licensed to carry firearms and a police detective testified that two guns were in the room, one in a safe and another in a black leather bag. Police said Shanteari left a note inside saying that she wanted to wound her husband, not kill him. The notebook also had writings about putting a bullet in his head, police said. Baltimore County police detectives said they recently began investigating James Weems after they learned about allegations that he sexually abused at least three children. James Weems was arrested while hospitalized and he faces 13 charges of abuse. Shanteari Weems, a former corrections officer, was arrested and charged with assault with intent to kill. A judge denied her pre-trial release and said she should have known that the system would address the allegations against her husband. She is being held in jail without bond and is due back in court on August 9, 2022. Baltimore County police said the day care facility is closed for the time being. Shanteari Weems pleaded guilty on November 28, 2022, to one count of aggravated assault and one count of carrying a pistol without a license. On February 3, 2023, Judge Michael O’Keefe sentenced her to 48 months in prison with 24 months of supervised probation after her release. Shanteari Weems, who now goes by the name Shanteari Young after divorcing James Weems Jr. (who was convicted of rape and sexual abuse in 2024, and was sentenced to life in prison.), was released from prison in late June 2025 and sent to a halfway home in Washington, D.C. Young also told a reporter she would likely finish out her sentence in home confinement until December 2025.
