= Martin Lundstedt =

Swedish business executive

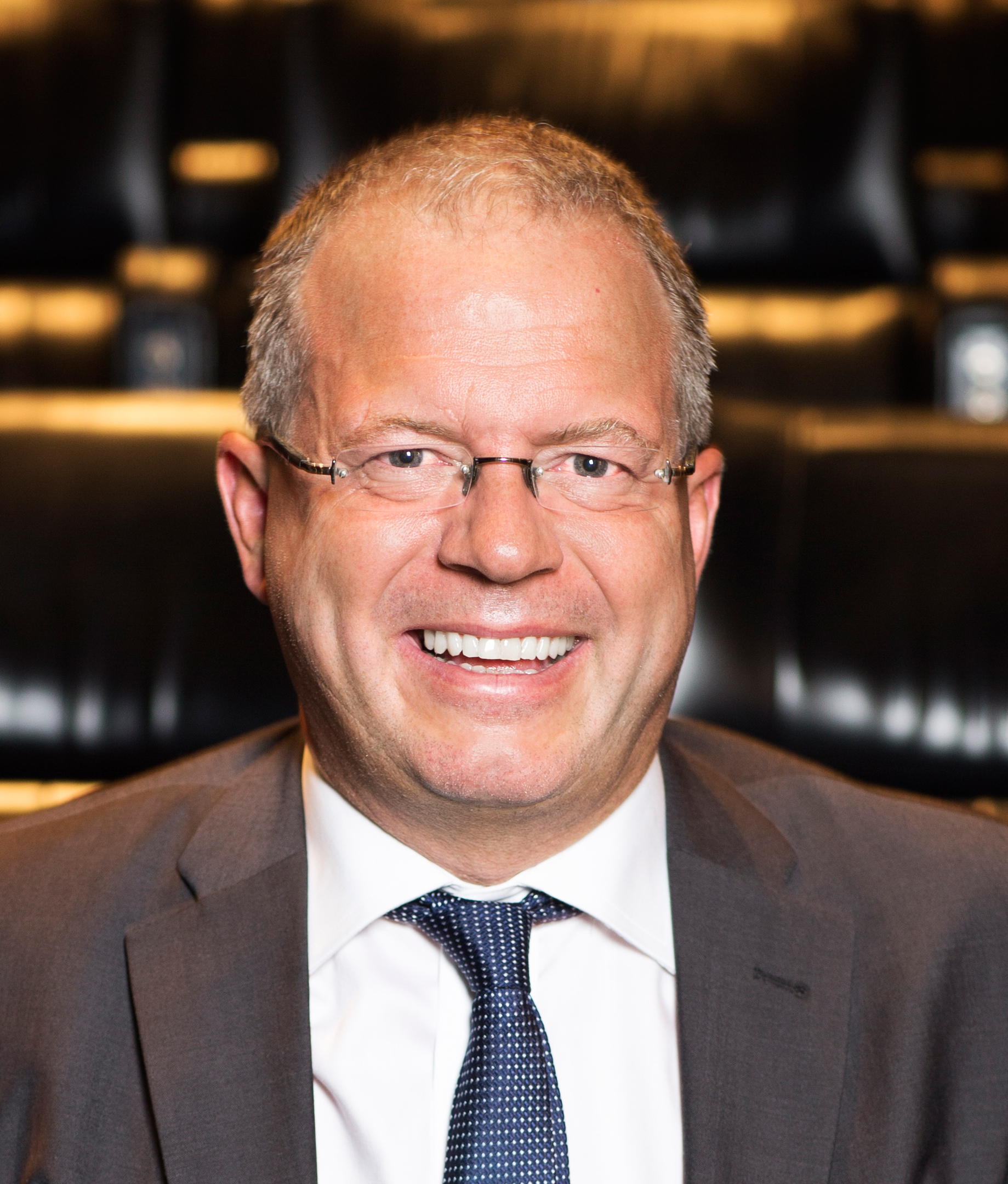
- Born: 28 April 1967 (age 59); Mariestad, Sweden
- Education: MSc Chalmers University of Technology, University of Gothenburg
- Occupations: President and CEO of Volvo Group

Martin Lundstedt (born 28 April 1967 in Mariestad, Sweden) is a Swedish businessman and has been president and CEO of the Volvo Group since 22 October 2015. He has 25 years experience in development, production and sales within the heavy automotive industry.

== Education ==
Lundstedt studied at Chalmers University of Technology and graduated with an Master of Science in mechanical engineering.

== Career ==
Lundstedt joined Scania as a trainee in 1992 and held a number of senior management positions during his 23 years with the company, eventually taking over as the president and CEO of Scania from 2012 to 2015. While at Scania, he helped build their reputation in sustainable transport solutions. In Oct 2015, he took over as president and CEO of the Volvo Group, replacing Olof Persson. He is also the chairman of the Commercial Vehicle Board of the European Automobile Manufacturers’ Association (ACEA).

== Other activities ==
- European Round Table of Industrialists (ERT), Member
