= Shashank R. Joshi =

Indian endocrinologist

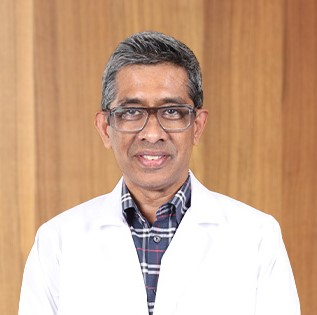
- Born: India
- Occupation: Endocrinologist
- Spouse: Shilpa
- Children: Samika; Spandana
- Awards: Padma Shri

Shashank R. Joshi is an Indian endocrinologist, diabetologist and medical researcher. He was honoured by the Government of India, in 2014, by bestowing on him the Padma Shri, the fourth highest civilian award, for his services to the field of medicine. He is a part of the COVID-19 Task Force for the state of Maharashtra, India.

== Biography ==
Born in Mumbai, the capital of the western Indian state of Maharashtra, Shashank R Joshi had a noteworthy academic career, topping all the medical examinations he sat for with first rank and gold medal. Joshi secured his graduate degree in medicine, MBBS, from the Grant Medical College and Sir Jamshedjee Jeejeebhoy Group of Hospitals, Mumbai which was followed with MD in internal medicine and senior residency from the Seth GS Medical College and KEM Hospital. He continued his higher education at the Grant Medical College and Sir Jamshedjee Jeejeebhoy Group of Hospitals and subsequently got DM in endocrinology. He is also a Fellow of the American College of Endocrinology(USA), Fellow of the American College of Physicians (USA), Fellow of the Royal College of Physicians and Surgeons (Glasgow) and a Fellow of the Royal College of Physicians (Edinburgh). He has a Diploma of Growth from Sweden, too.

Joshi started his career by joining the faculty of the Seth G.S. Medical College and KEM Hospital at their endocrinology department. Later, he moved to the Grant Medical College and Sir Jamshedjee Jeejeebhoy Group of Hospitals as a faculty member. He is now working at Lilavati Hospital and Research Centre, Mumbai, as the Consultant Endocrine and Metabolic Physician and has private practice at Joshi Clinic in the city. He also works as consultant endocrinologist at Bhatia Hospital, Mumbai and serves as visiting faculty at various Indian and international universities.

Shashank R Joshi is married to Shilpa, who is a dietician and diabetics educator and the couple has two daughters, Samika and Spandana.

== Positions ==
Joshi is the President of two important organizations, the Indian Academy of Diabetes and the Association of Physicians of India (API). He was also a former President of the Research Society for Study of Diabetes in India (RSSDI) and the All India Association of Advancing Research in Obesity. He is the former Vice President of the Association of Physicians of India and is now its advisory board member.

Joshi is involved with the activities of the American Association of Clinical Endocrinology (AACE) and is serving as the Chairperson of its India Chapter. Some of the past positions he held include:

- Visiting Clinician at the Mayo Clinic.
- Member of the ICMR-WHO Task Force for Management of Type 2 Diabetes.
- Director of the Asian Health Clinic in Western Australia.

== Research and publications ==
Shashank Joshi is involved in evidence based research on Endocrinology with special emphasis on Diabetes, Obesity, Thyroid, Osteoporosis and Growth. His studies on the Asian Indian phenotype (thin-fat Indian), co-morbidities in hypothyroidism and the impact of vitamin D deficiency on bone health in Asian Indians are notable. He has also worked as the principal investigator in many teams engaged in multinational clinical trials and has covered two epidemics of diabetes and hypertension in India and Adult Growth Hormone deficiency.

Joshi is a prolific writer of articles on Diabetology and Endocrinology and has published 18 books and monograms and over 600 research publications on topics such as Diabetes, Obesity, Thyroid disorders, Osteoporosis, and Growth. He is also the Editor of Practical Medicine, a popular undergraduate Indian text book. He is also the Editor Emeritus of the Journal of the Association of Physicians of India and has been the Editor of three prominent Indian journals namely Indian Journal of Obesity, Indian Journal of Endocrinology and Metabolism and Indian Journal of Clinical Pharmacology and Therapeutics. Dr. Joshi founded the Indian Journal of Critical Care Medicine and was its Executive Editor.

Selected articles

- Shashank R. Joshi; Muruga Vadivale; Jamshed J. Dalal & Ashok Kumar Das (2011). "The Screening India's Twin Epidemic: Study design and methodology (SITE-1)". Indian Journal of Endocrinology and Metabolism. 15(Suppl 4) (October): 389–394. doi:10.4103/2230-8210.86857. PMC 3230100. PMID 22145145.
- Talaviya PA; Saboo BD; Joshi SR; Padhiyar JN; Chandarana HK; Shah SJ; Vyas CK; Shah AN (2013). "Pregnancy outcome and glycemic control in women with type 1 diabetes: a retrospective comparison between CSII and MDI treatment". Diabetes Metab Syndrome. 7 (April–June): 68–71. doi:10.1016/j.dsx.2013.02.032. PMID 23680243. Archived from the original on 4 March 2016.
- Joshi S; Joshi SR; Mohan V. (2013). "Methodology and feasibility of a structured education program for diabetes education in India: The National Diabetes Educator Program". Indian Journal of Endocrinology and Metabolism. 17 (May): 396–401. doi:10.4103/2230-8210.111610. PMC 3712368. PMID 23869294. Archived from the original on 4 March 2016.
- Joshi, S.R., Mohan, V., Joshi, S.S., Mechanick, J.I., Marchetti, A. (2012). "Transcultural diabetes nutrition therapy algorithm: the asian Indian application". Curr Diab Rep. 12 (April): 204–212. doi:10.1007/s11892-012-0260-0. PMC 3303049. PMID 22354498.
- Joshi, S.R., Saboo, B., Vadivale, M., Dani, S.I., Mithal, A., Kaul, U., Badgandi, M., Iyengar, S.S., Viswanathan, V., Sivakadaksham, N., Chattopadhyaya, P.S., Biswas, A.D., Jindal, S., Khan, I.A., Sethi, B.K., Rao, V.D., Dalal, J.J. (2012). "Prevalence of diagnosed and undiagnosed diabetes and hypertension in India--results from the Screening India's Twin Epidemic (SITE) study". Diabetes Technol Ther. 14 (November): 8–15. doi:10.1089/dia.2011.0243. PMID 22050271.

== Awards and recognitions ==
Shashank R Joshi was honoured by the Government of India by awarding him the Padma Shri, in 2014, in recognition of his efforts to the cause of medicine. He is also a recipient of the International Clinician Award, received at the 21st American Association of Clinical Endocrinologists (AACE) Annual Scientific and Clinical Congress, Philadelphia. This is an annual award given to practicing endocrinologists, outside the US. Pharma Leaders in the year 2013 conferred "Medical Expert of the Decade" at 6th Annual Pharmaceutical Leadership Summit founded by Satya Brahma. Indian Affairs India Leadership Conclave 2014 edition declared Dr. Shashank Joshi as "Healthcare Visionary of the Year" .

== See also ==
- Endocrinology
- Diabetology
