= Valentino Valentini (politician) =

Italian politician (born 1962)

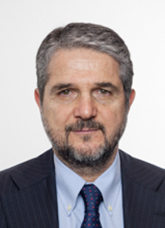
- Valentini in 2018

Member of the Chamber of Deputies
- In office 28 April 2006 – 12 October 2022
- Constituency: Veneto 1 (2006–2018); Lombardy 1 – 02 (2018–2022)

Personal details
- Born: 28 June 1962 (age 63)
- Party: Forza Italia

Valentino Valentini (born 28 June 1962) is an Italian politician serving as deputy minister for business and made in Italy since 2022. From 2006 to 2022, he was a member of the Chamber of Deputies.
