= Tarun Chhabra =

American lawyer

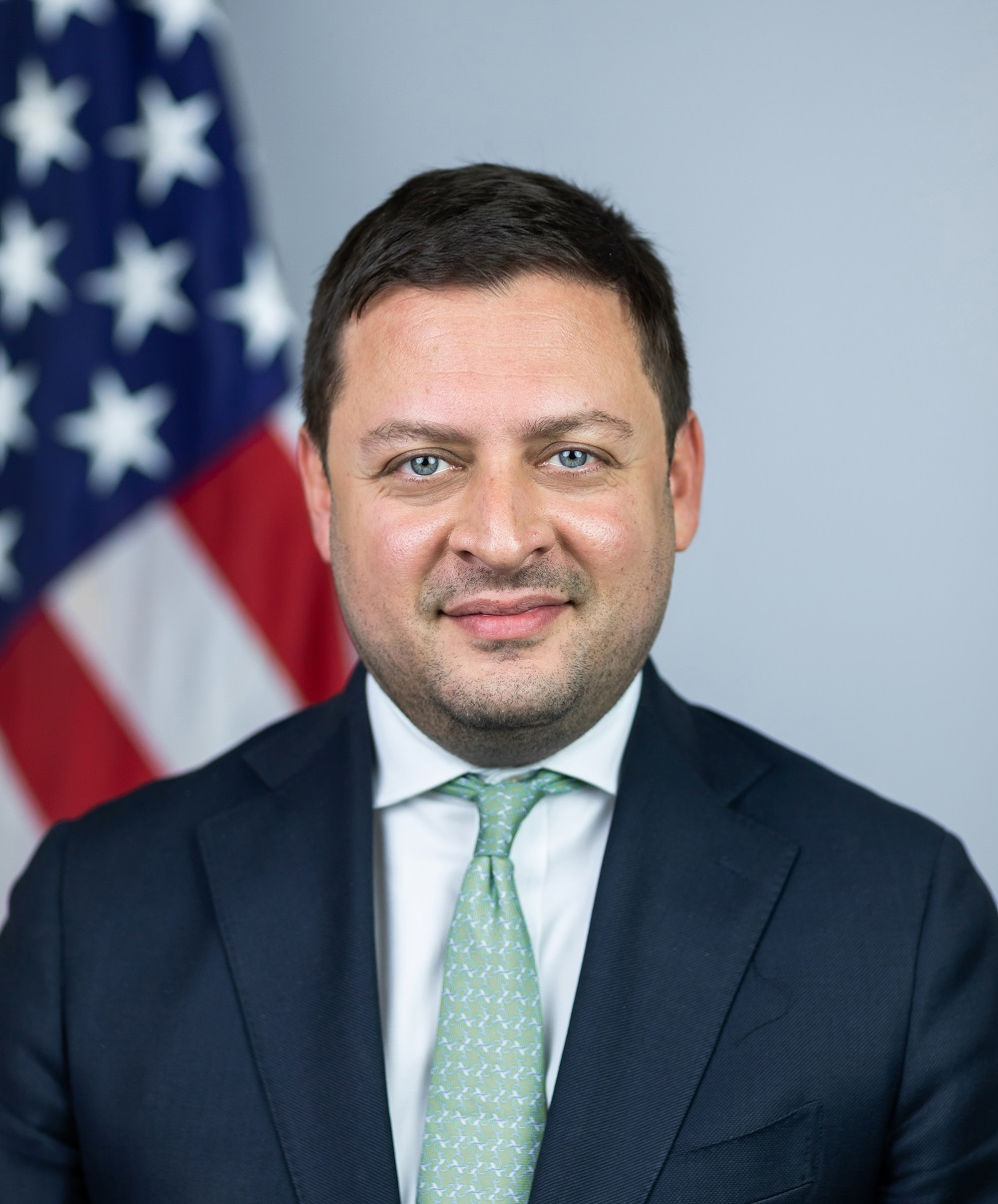
- Born: 1979 or 1980 (age 46–47); Chattanooga, Tennessee, US
- Education: Stanford University (BA), University of Oxford (M.Phil), Harvard Law School (JD), Moscow State Institute of International Relations
- Occupation: Senior U.S. national security official
- Employer: U.S. National Security Council

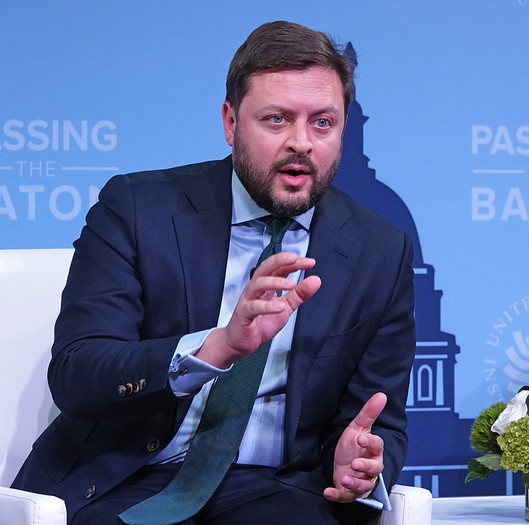
Chhabra in 2025

Tarun Chhabra (born 1979 or 1980) is an American lawyer and an adviser at the AI company Anthropic. Chhabra served as Deputy Assistant to the President and Coordinator for Technology and National Security at the United States National Security Council in the Biden administration. He previously served as Special Assistant to the President and Senior Director for Technology and National Security.

== Early life and education ==
Chhabra was born in Chattanooga, Tennessee, and raised in Shreveport, Louisiana, to Indian immigrants. Chhabra holds a BA (Hons) from Stanford University where he was elected to Phi Beta Kappa, a M.Phil in international relations from University of Oxford as a Marshall Scholar, and a JD from Harvard Law School as a Heyman Fellow and Paul and Daisy Soros Fellow for New Americans. He studied in Russia as a Fulbright Scholar at the Moscow State Institute of International Relations.

== Career ==
In 2009, Chhabra was awarded the Paul and Daisy Soros Fellowship for New Americans to pursue a JD at Harvard.

He was previously a senior fellow at Georgetown University's Center for Security and Emerging Technology (CSET), and a fellow at the Brookings Institution, where he directed the Project on International Order and Strategy and co-directed a Brookings initiative on PRC global influence with Rush Doshi.

Chhabra's research focused on U.S.-China relations, U.S. grand strategy, and alliance building.

== Publications ==
=== Books ===
- Global China: Assessing China's Growing Role in the World (Brookings Institution Press, 2021), co-edited with Rush Doshi, Ryan Hass, and Emilie Kimball.

=== Reports ===
- Agile Alliances: How the United States and Its Allies Can Deliver a Democratic Way of AI, CSET, February 2020 (co-authored with Andrew Imbrie, Ryan Fedasiuk, Catherine Aiken, and Husanjot Chahal)
- The China Challenge, Democracy, and U.S. Grand Strategy, Brookings Policy Brief, February 2019.

=== Articles ===
- "The Left Should Play the China Card: How Foreign Rivalry Inspires Progress at Home," Foreign Affairs, February 13, 2020 (co-authored with Scott Moore and Dominic Tierney).

== Personal life ==
Chhabra met Aliza Watters while they were Marshall Scholars at Oxford, and the two married in 2010.
