= Wojciech Kostrzewa =

Polish manager and entrepreneur

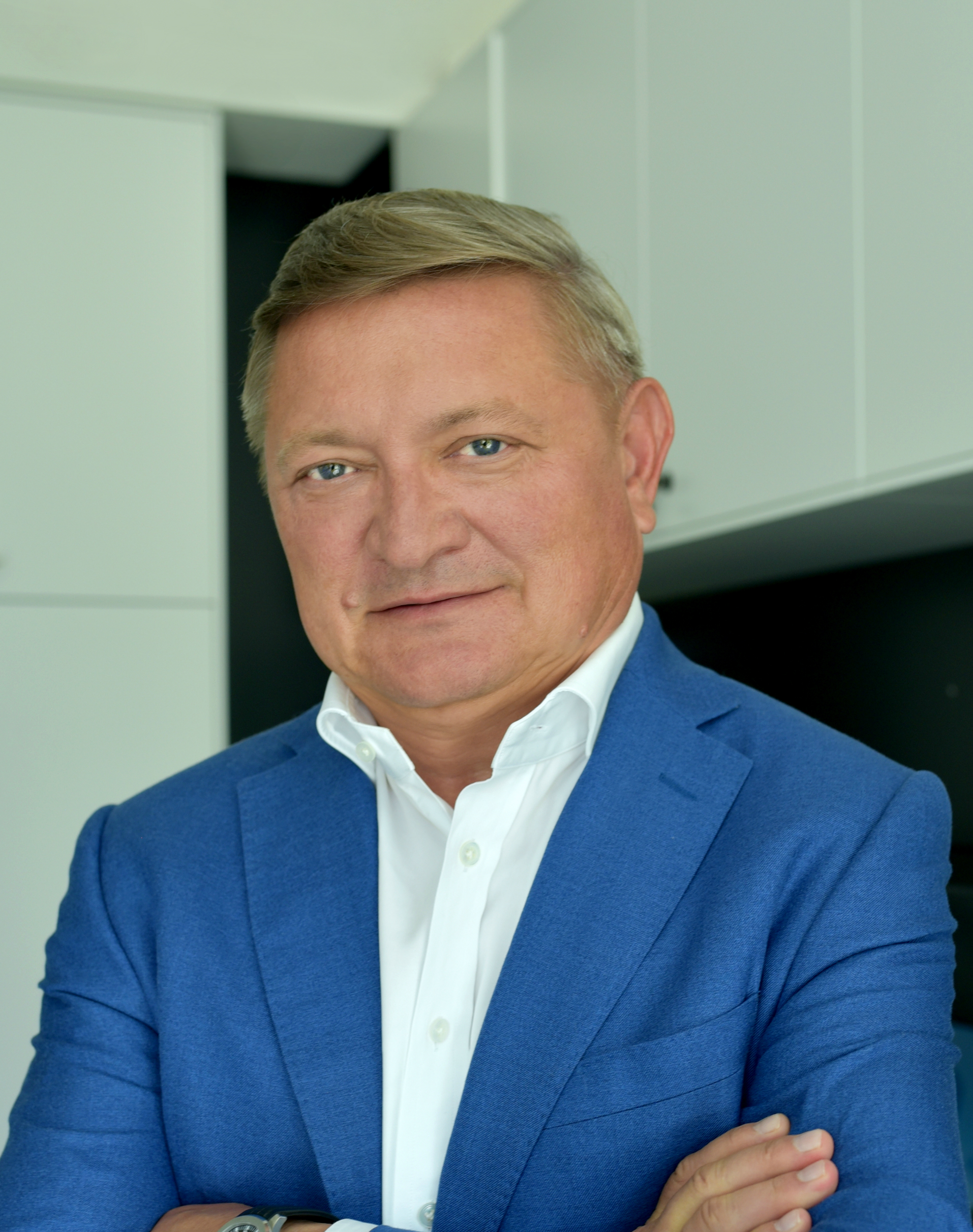
- Born: October 18, 1960 (age 65); Warsaw, Poland
- Education: University of Kiel
- Occupations: manager, entrepreneur
- Title: Chairman of Billon
- Awards: Order of Polonia Restituta

Wojciech Kostrzewa (pronounced [ˈvɔjt͡ɕɛx kɔstˈʂɛva]; born October 18, 1960) is a Polish manager and entrepreneur. Among other roles, he serves as president of the supervisory board at Alior Bank, member of the board of directors at Stadler Rail, and president of the Polish Business Roundtable.

== Education and academic activity ==
Wojciech Kostrzewa graduated from the Faculty of Economics at the University of Kiel in 1987. He also studied law at the University of Warsaw in 1979–1981. In 1981, together with four other students from Austria, Hungary, and West Germany, he founded the European Law Students' Association (ELSA). In 1984–1991, he worked as a graduate assistant at the University of Kiel and later became a researcher at the Kiel Institute for the World Economy. He published several academic papers on economics and finance.

== Professional career ==
In 1989–1991, Wojciech Kostrzewa served as an economic advisor to the Polish Finance Minister, Leszek Balcerowicz. In 1990–1995, he was the President of the Management Board of Polski Bank Rozwoju. In 1996, he became Deputy President of the Management Board, and in 1998 President of the Management Board of BRE Bank (today's mBank), where he worked until 2004. In 2002–2004, he was also the regional director of Commerzbank, responsible for its operations in Central and Eastern Europe. At that time, he was reported to be the only Pole who occupied a high managerial position at a foreign private bank. In 2005–2018, he was the President of the Management Board of ITI Group and long-term chairman of the supervisory board of TVN, one of the biggest Polish private TV broadcasters in the period of his presidency. He was also co-founder and co-owner of Quedex Bitcoin Derivatives Exchange licensed by the Gibraltar Financial Services Commission (GFSC).

In 2018–2024, he was President of the Management Board of the Polish-British fintech company Billon, a FCA and PFSA registered e-money institution, which develops a technology to store and transfer regulated currencies and other data based on a proprietary blockchain. In 2024–2025, he served as the company's chairman. Currently, Wojciech Kostrzewa is also member of the board of directors of the Swiss railway rolling stock manufacturer Stadler Rail (since 2012), member of supervisory boards of the Ergo Hestia insurance group's companies (since 2017), owner and chairman of the Pascal Publishing House. In 2020–2023, he was member of the supervisory board of the Polish branch of Canal+. In 2025, he became president of the supervisory board of Alior Bank.

He was one of the founders and in 2004–2007 president of the German-Polish Chamber of Commerce and Industry. In 2007–2020, he served as vice president of the Polish Confederation Lewiatan (Konfederacja Lewiatan), a Polish nationwide employers' organization, where he currently serves as member of the General Council. In 2015, he was elected vice president, and in 2019 president of the Polish Business Roundtable (Polska Rada Biznesu), organization of owners and Presidents of the Management Board of largest companies in Poland. In 2021, he was re-elected to serve his second term. In 2023, he began his third term.

== Honors ==
- Order of Polonia Restituta (2015)
