= Burnay =

Burnay can refer to:

- Burnay Palace, a palace in Lisbon, Portugal
- Burnay Ifugao language, a dialect of the Ifugao language
- Burnay jar, a large glazed earthen jar used for fermenting food products in the Philippines
