= Alcântara, Lisbon =

Quarter and civil parish of the Portuguese capital

Alcântara
- Civil parish and quarter
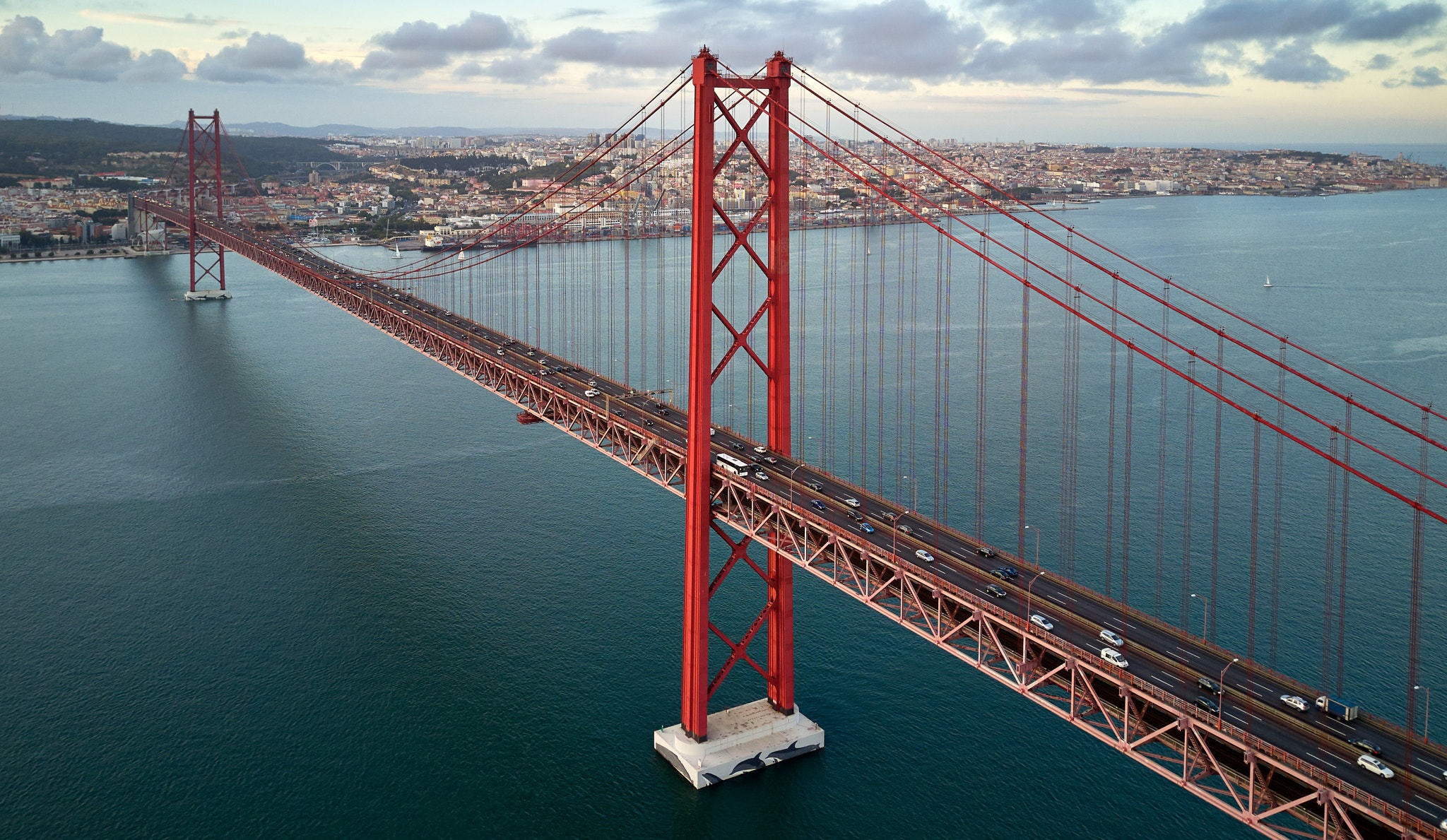
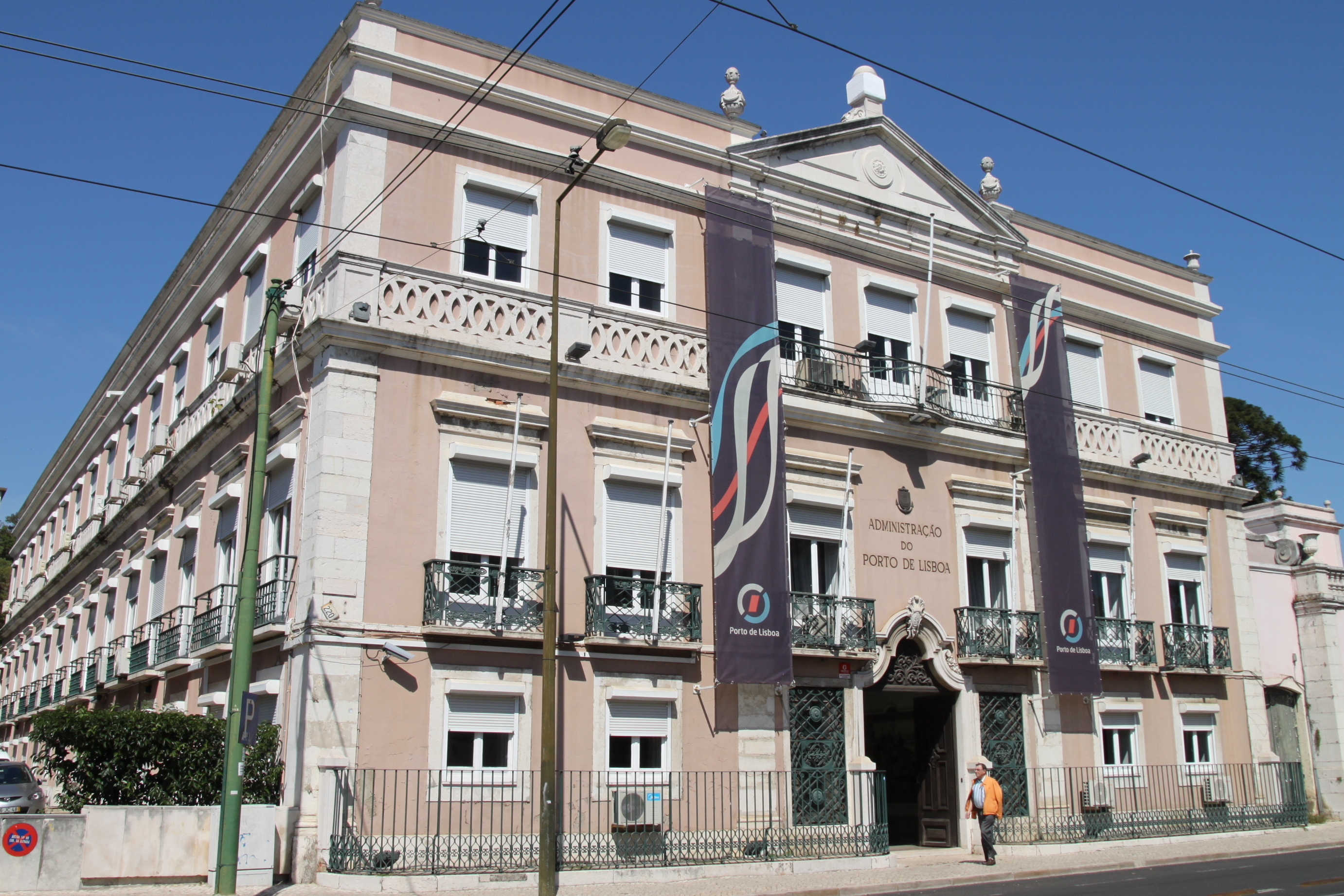
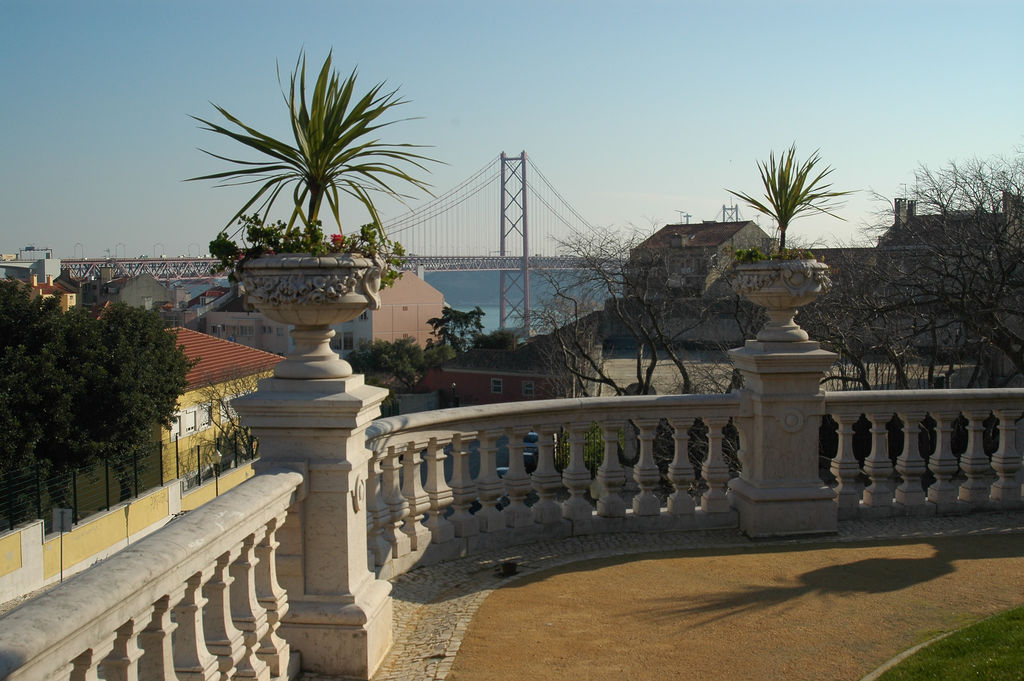
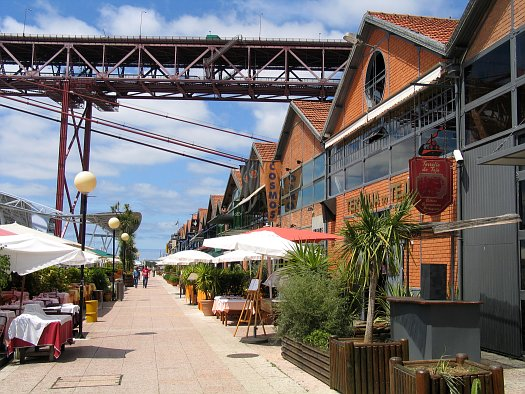
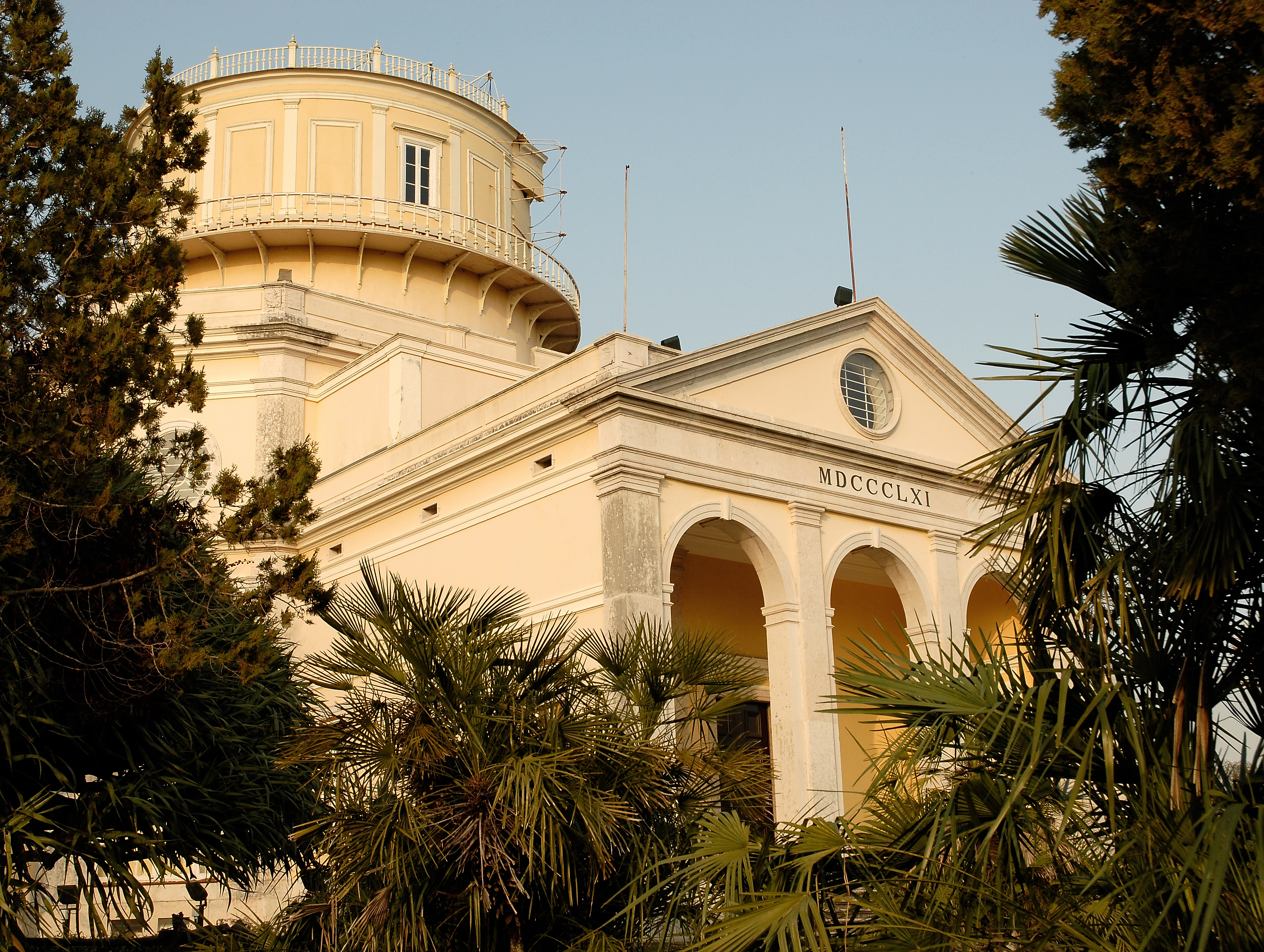
- Clockwise: 25 de Abril Bridge; view from Pestana Palace; Lisbon Astronomical Observatory; Santo Amaro Dock; Lisbon Port Management headquarters.

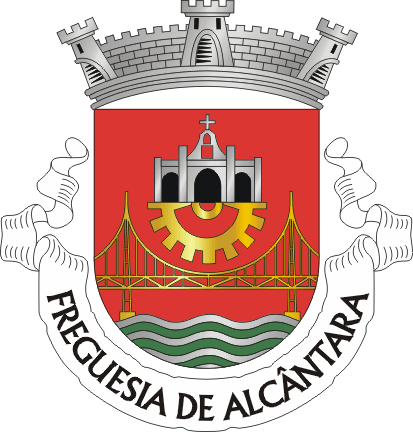
- Coat of arms
- Interactive map of Alcântara
- Coordinates: 38.705°N 9.177°W
- Country: Portugal
- Metro area: Lisbon
- Region: Greater Lisbon
- District: Lisbon
- Municipality: Lisbon
- Territorial Unit: Western
- Settlement: Antiquity
- Freguesia: 8 April 1770
- Current borders: 8 November 2012
- Seat: Rua dos Lusíadas, nº13 1300-366 Lisboa

Government
  - Type: Civil parish
  - Body: Junta de Freguesia
  - President: Mauro Santos (Viver Lisboa (PS-L-BE-PAN))

Area
  - Total: 5.07 km^{2} (1.96 sq mi)

Population (2021)
  - Total: 13,850
  - Density: 2,730/km^{2} (7,080/sq mi)
- Demonym: alcantarense
- Time zone: UTC+00:00 (WET)
  - Summer (DST): UTC+01:00 (WEST)
- Postal code: 1300
- Area code: 21
- Patron saint: Saint Peter
- Website: https://www.jf-alcantara.pt/

Alcântara (Portuguese pronunciation: [alˈkɐ̃tɐɾɐ]) is a freguesia (civil parish) and typical quarter of Lisbon, the capital of Portugal. Located in western Lisbon, Alcântara is to the east of Ajuda and Belém and west of Estrela and Campo de Ourique. Alcântara had a population in 2011 of 13,943.

== History ==
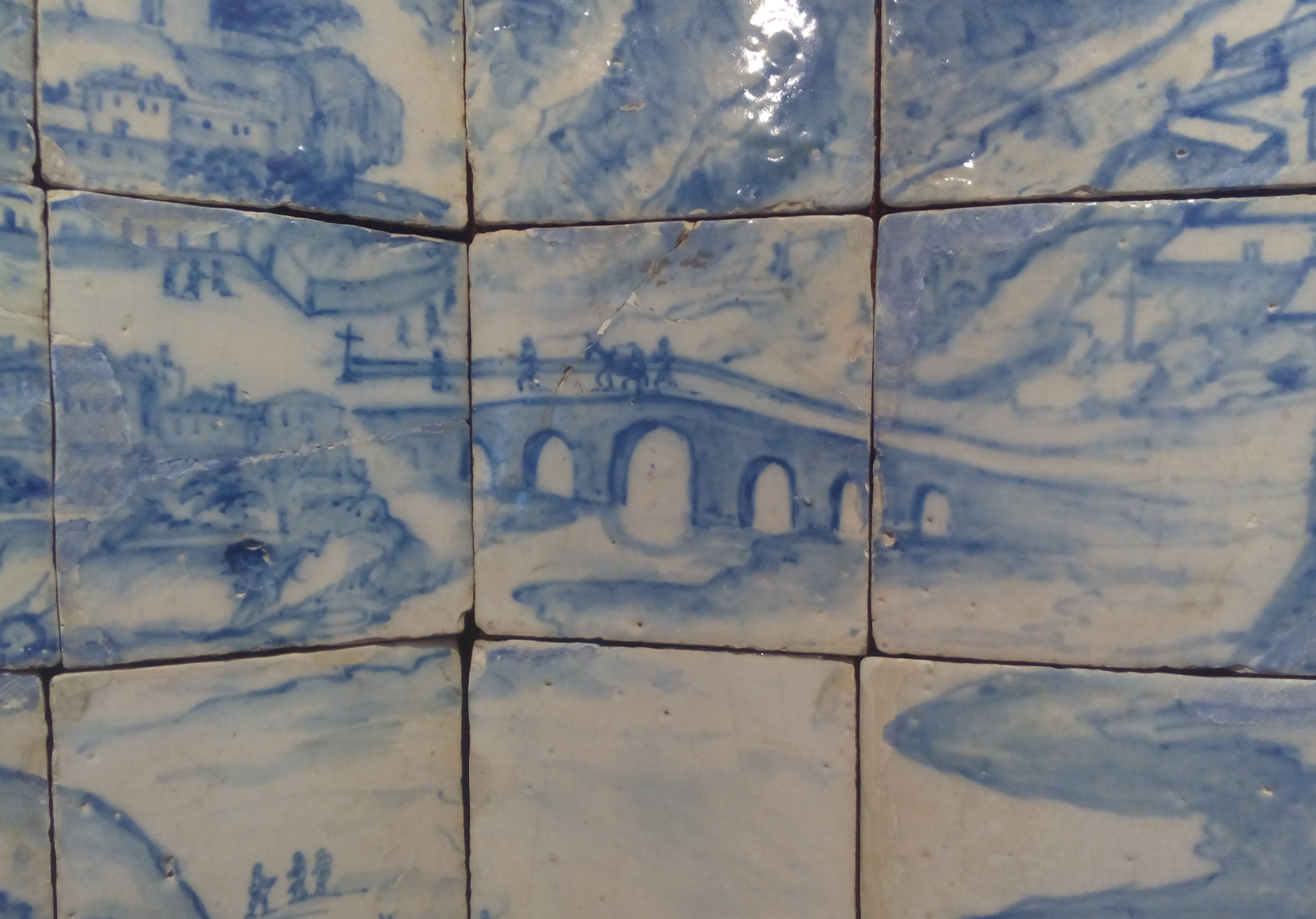
The Roman bridge of Alcântara, before the earthquake of 1755

Primitive utensils from the Paleolithic era have been discovered on the margins of the Alcântara ravine, and signs in the hilly part of the neighborhood, in the areas of Alvito and Tapada da Ajuda, indicate a level of occupation in the Neolithic and Chalcolithic periods. Around 1300, Bronze Age farmers and shepherds established small villages in this area, with a subsistence economy based on herding and the cultivation of cereal crops.

During the Roman era, the local area was called Horta Navia in honour of the Roman divinity Nabia, a goddess of rivers and water. The area was notable for a Roman bridge across the Alcântara ravine and, following the Muslim era, the area began to be referred to in terms of this bridge. The name Alcântara, derived from the Arab al-qantara (القنطارة) means bridge. This is the name given to the bridge that crossed the river in this part, which ended up being called the Alcântara Brook, or, river (Ribeira de Alcântara) in the time of John V.

=== Medieval ===
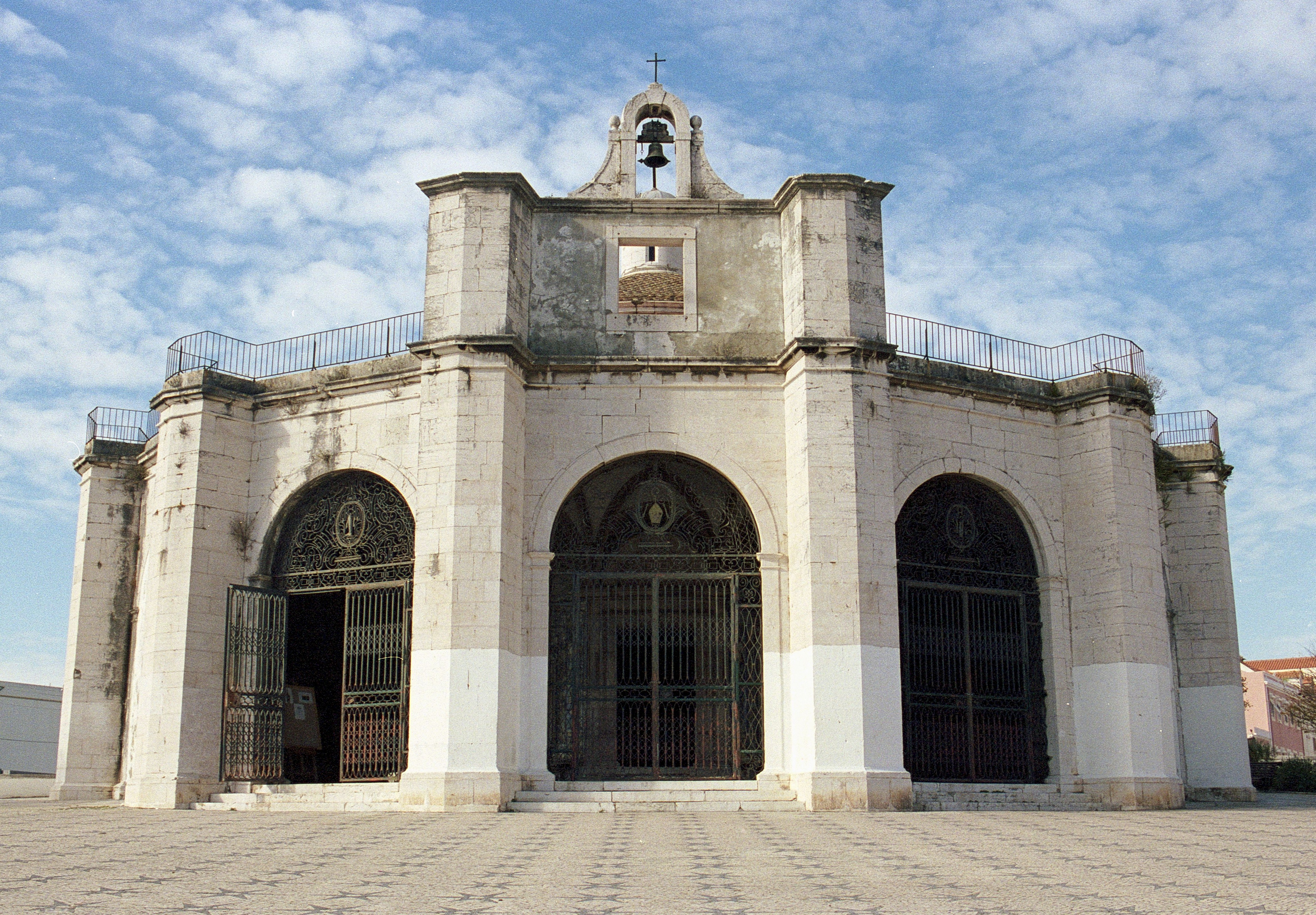
The Capela de Santo Amaro, built in 1549 by Diogo de Torralva

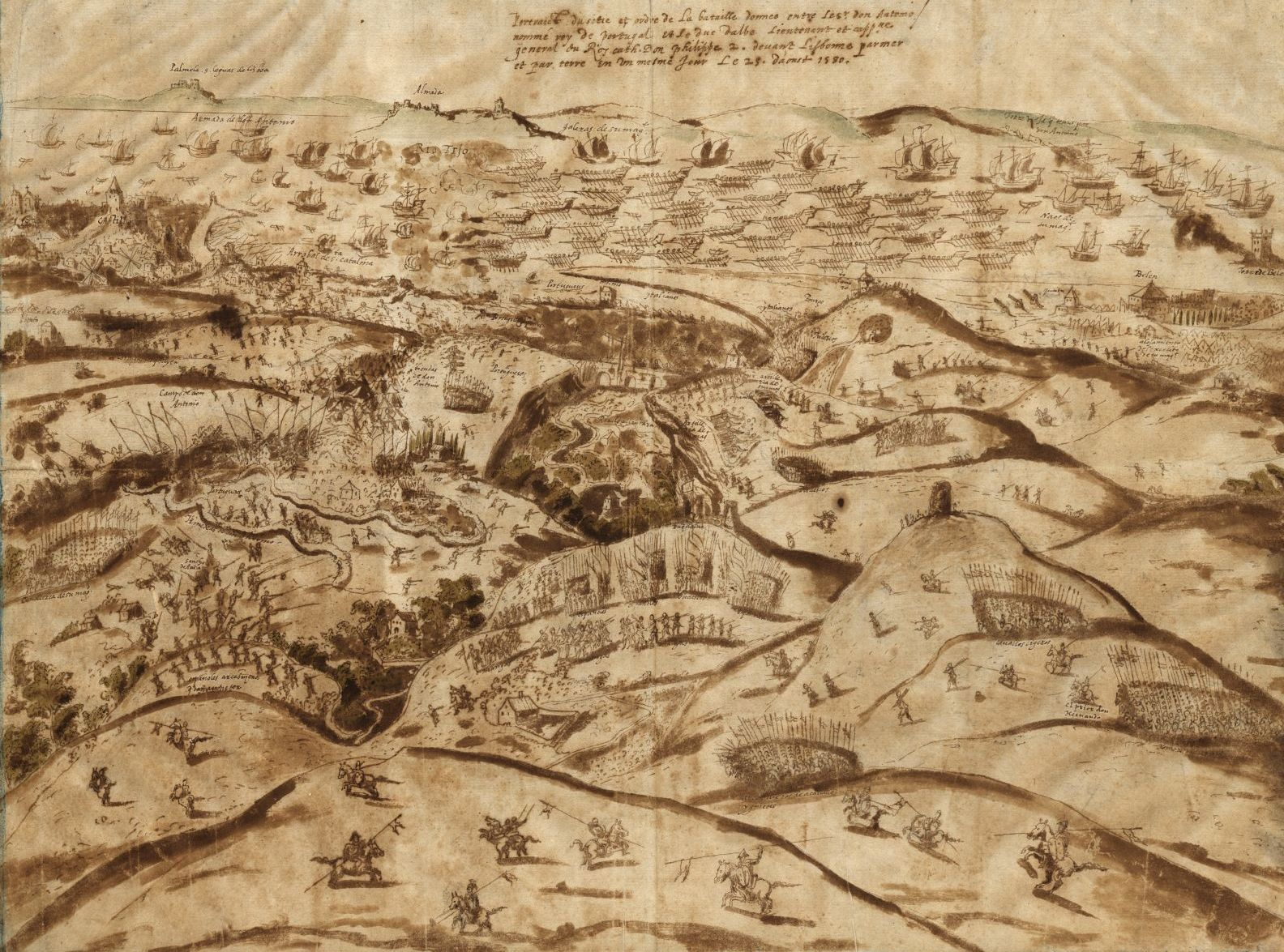
The 1580 Battle of Alcântara, fought between António, Prior of Crato and forces loyal to Philip I of Portugal

After the Reconquista of Lisbon (1147), the area became integrated into the Reguengos de Ribamar (a reguengo or realengo was, in medieval Portugal, a village directly subject to the jurisdiction of the monarch) that included terrain that extended from the Alcântara ravine to the Laje ravine, in today's Oeiras.

After the 13th century, the Reguengos were divided in two with the Algés valley as the border. The lands of current Alcântara were attributed, in gratitude by the King, to the nobility, religious orders or military.

Yet, Alcântara became a battlefield in conflicts between Portugal and Castile, which included intrigues involving King Ferdinand and conflicts with the Kingdom of Castile after his death. Among these the most significant was the siege of Lisbon in 1384, an episode of the Crisis of 1383-1385.

In March 1382, an armada under the authority of John I of Castile entered the Tagus estuary, but was unable to crack the defenses; the force advanced inland attacking, sacking and stealing cattle.

In the 15th century, the exploitation of the Alcântara stone quarries, used for the extraction of building materials or for the production of lime, contributed to the economic development and population of the area (along with the ovens of Cais do Sodré). In the areas near the river there were also orchards and vineyards along the ravines helped to diversify the regional economy.

=== 16th century ===
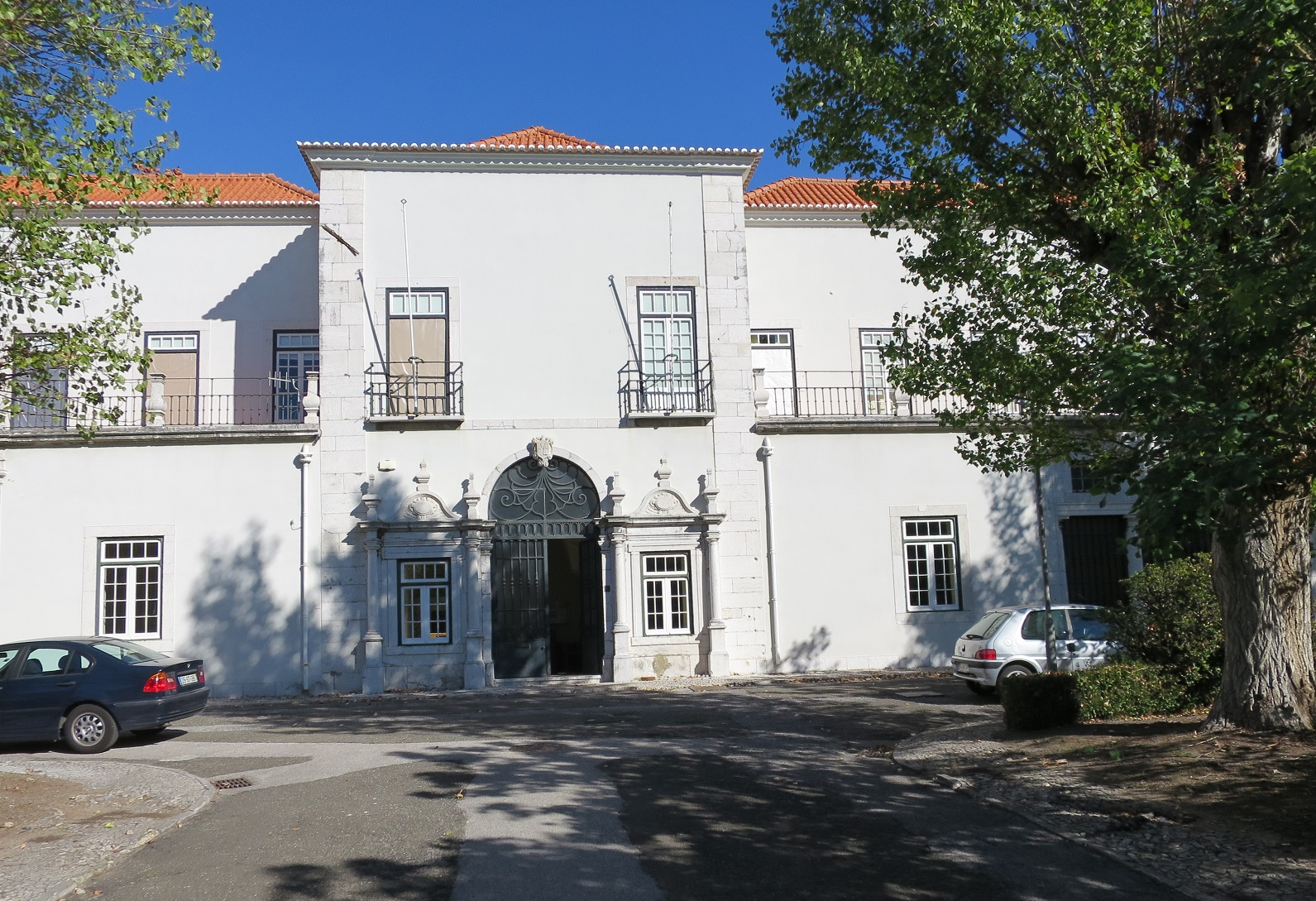
The Palácio da Ega in the Calçada da Boa Hora, home of the Arquivo Histórico Ultramarino

A hospital was constructed in 1520 in the garden of Jerónimo de Eça (Horta Navia) in order to combat the plague that was devastating the city of Lisbon. Yet, the plague did not impede nobles from constructing estates along the Tagus; Alcântara was situated near the border of the parish of Ajuda, an extension of the nobility. A chapel dedicated to Santo Amaro was begun in 1549, and served as a sacristy for many of the pilgrims that crossed the territory.

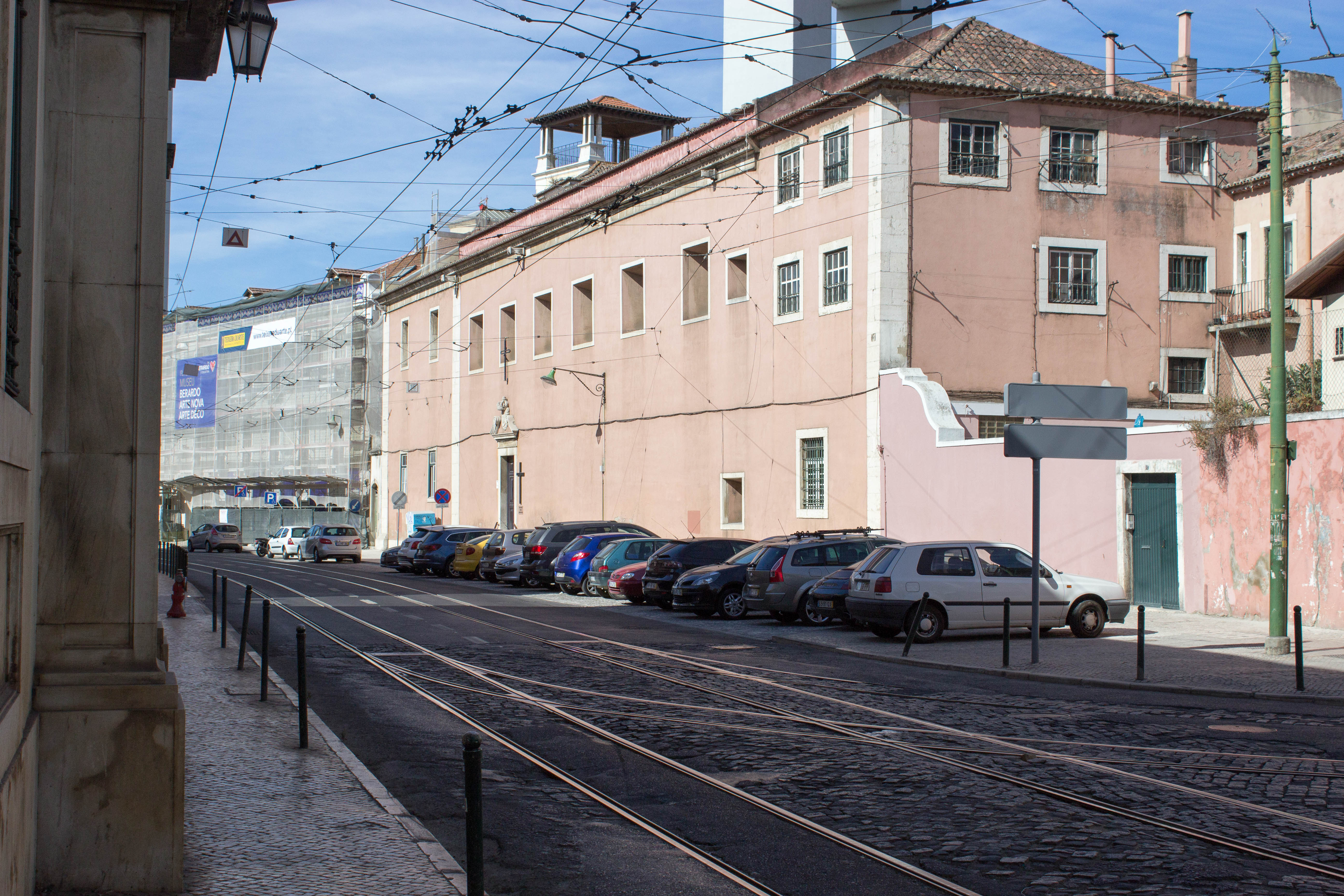
Igreja and Convento das Flamengas on Rua 1.º de Maio

King Ferdinand made António, Prior of Crato, the frontier commander. Later, the death of King Sebastian at the Battle of Alcácer-Quibir resulted in a crisis in dynastic succession between António, Prior of Crato, Catherine, Duchess of Braganza and Philip II of Spain. From a military perspective, in order to limit support for António's claim to the crown, Phillip II determined to invade Portugal and cement his own claim to the throne. Forces from Badajoz and a Spanish fleet from Cádiz crossed the Caia ravine on 28 June 1580, where they began their invasion. António, Prior of Crato, concentrated his defense in Alcântara along the Caia ravine, where a double line of defense supported 36 carracks and nine galleons. Thus, the Spanish Thirds under the command of the Duke of Alba defeated the Portuguese forces of the Prior of Crato in the Battle of Alcántara, in the context of the Portuguese succession crisis. The Portuguese troops had a static defense and could not resist a flanking move, which resulted in the loss of the battle and of Portuguese independence for the next 60 years (Iberian Union). During the rule of the dynasty Habsburg, Alcântara experienced a certain urban development, with the construction of various convents and a royal palace. In particular, the Igreja e Convento das Flamengas, founded by Philip II, was built in 1582 to accommodate nuns who arrived from Flanders due to Calvinist persecution; in front of this structure, near the river, the Mosteiro do Monte Calvário was built, founded by D. Violante de Noronha in 1617.

=== Early Brigantine period ===
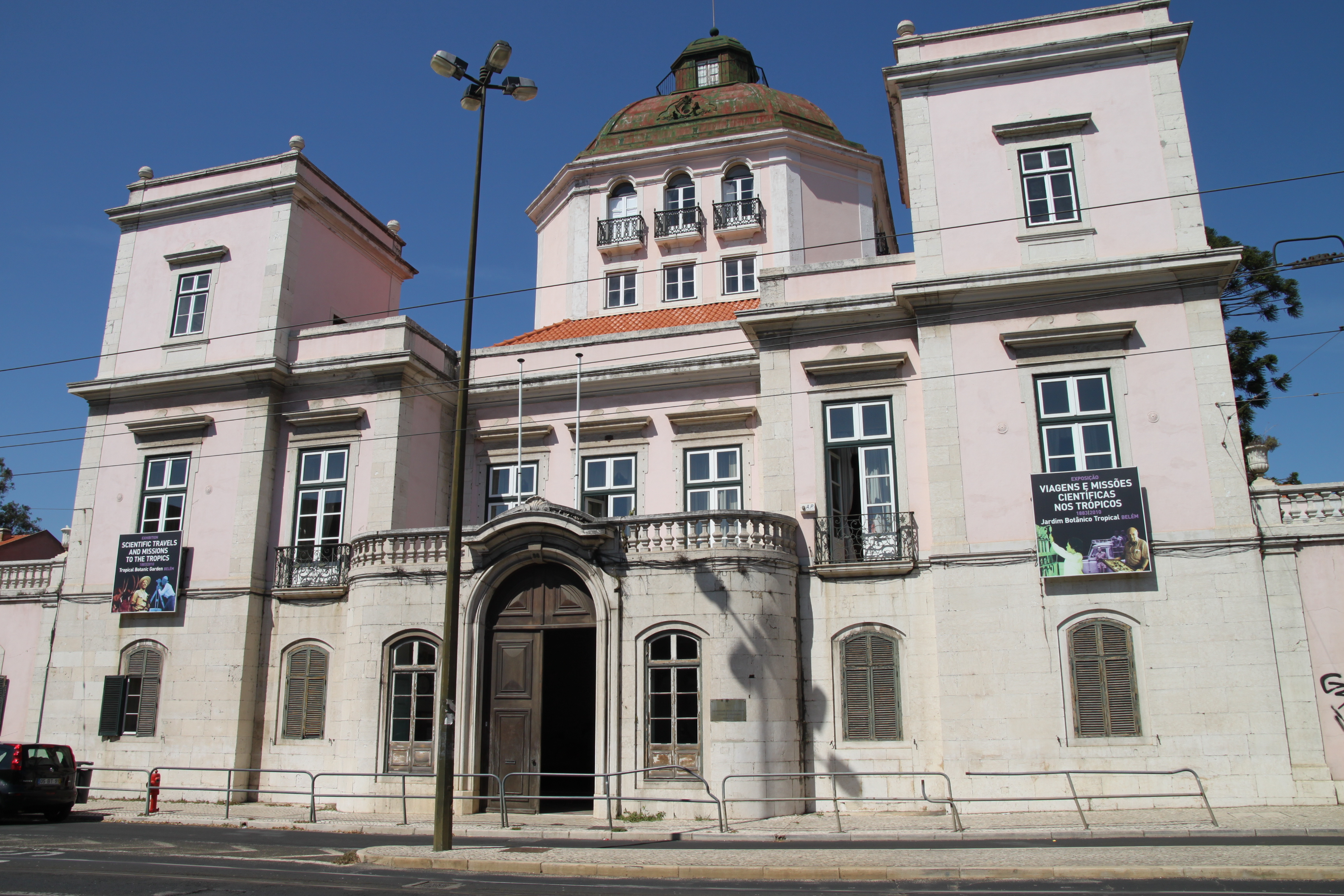
Burnay Palace, built in 1701, during its time as a campus of the Technical University of Lisbon.

In 1645, the Real Tapada de Alcântara, later called Tapada da Ajuda, was created, a hunting reserve of the Portuguese royal family. The Portuguese sovereigns had a particular predilection for Alcântara and Peter II of Portugal arranged to have his heart kept in the local Convento das Flamengas. Between 1690 and 1728 the Fábrica da Pólvora was built by Carlos de Sousa and Azevedo, intended for the production of gunpowder for the Portuguese fleet. The building of this factory is partially still existing, albeit in very precarious conditions, and is located in the Rua da Fábrica da Pólvora, parallel to the Avenida de Ceuta.

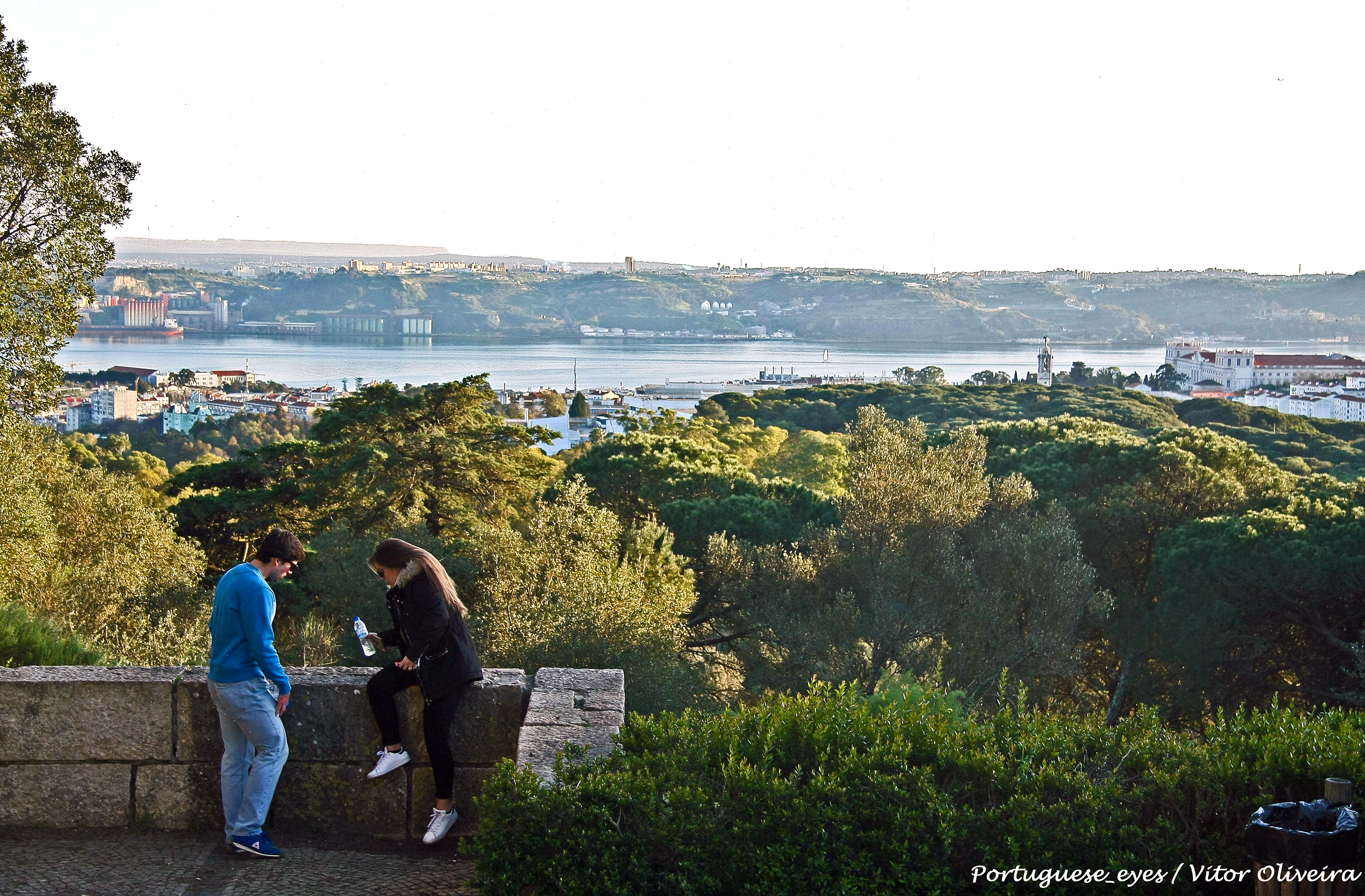
The Miradouro Keil do Amaral, located within the Monsanto Forest Park . The Ajuda National Palace is visible in the background on the right

In the 18th century, Alcântara had a population of around 600 inhabitants. There were two residential areas, one along the road that ran near the Palácio Real de Alcântara (today's Rua 1º de Maio ), the other near the Roman bridge (where Rua Vieira da Silva and Rua das Fontainhas are currently located ). Also during the 18th century, several prestigious residences were built in the area, such as the Palácio da Ribeira Grande and the Palácio Sabugosa. In 1743 the Alcântara bridge was renovated and embellished with a statue of Saint John Nepomucene, protector of sailors. This statue was later removed in the 19th century and is currently located in the Carmo Archeological Museum.

Although today it is quite central, it was once an outlying suburb of Lisbon, comprising mostly farms and palaces, such as the Royal Palace of Alcântara. In the 16th century, there was a brook on which the nobles used to promenade in their boats.

As a result of the 1755 earthquake and tsunami - which destroyed the Palácio Real de Alcântara - the King and his government moved to the zone of Alcântara, attracting with them the nobility, functionaries, municipal officials and those that lived alongside them, including artists, merchants and artisans. The registries during this era were full of references to families of the upper and lower nobility who began to live in this zone alongside the socially deprived and poor that already existed. King Joseph I of Portugal, having settled with his family and court in the Real Barraca in the nearby neighborhood of Ajuda, gave orders that the Real Tapada de Alcântara be renovated and enlarged for use by the royal family. Various industries were established in Alcântara thanks to the initiative of the Marquis of Pombal, in particular the Tinturaria da Real Fábrica das Sedas.

=== Foundation of the freguesia of Alcântara and the 19th century ===
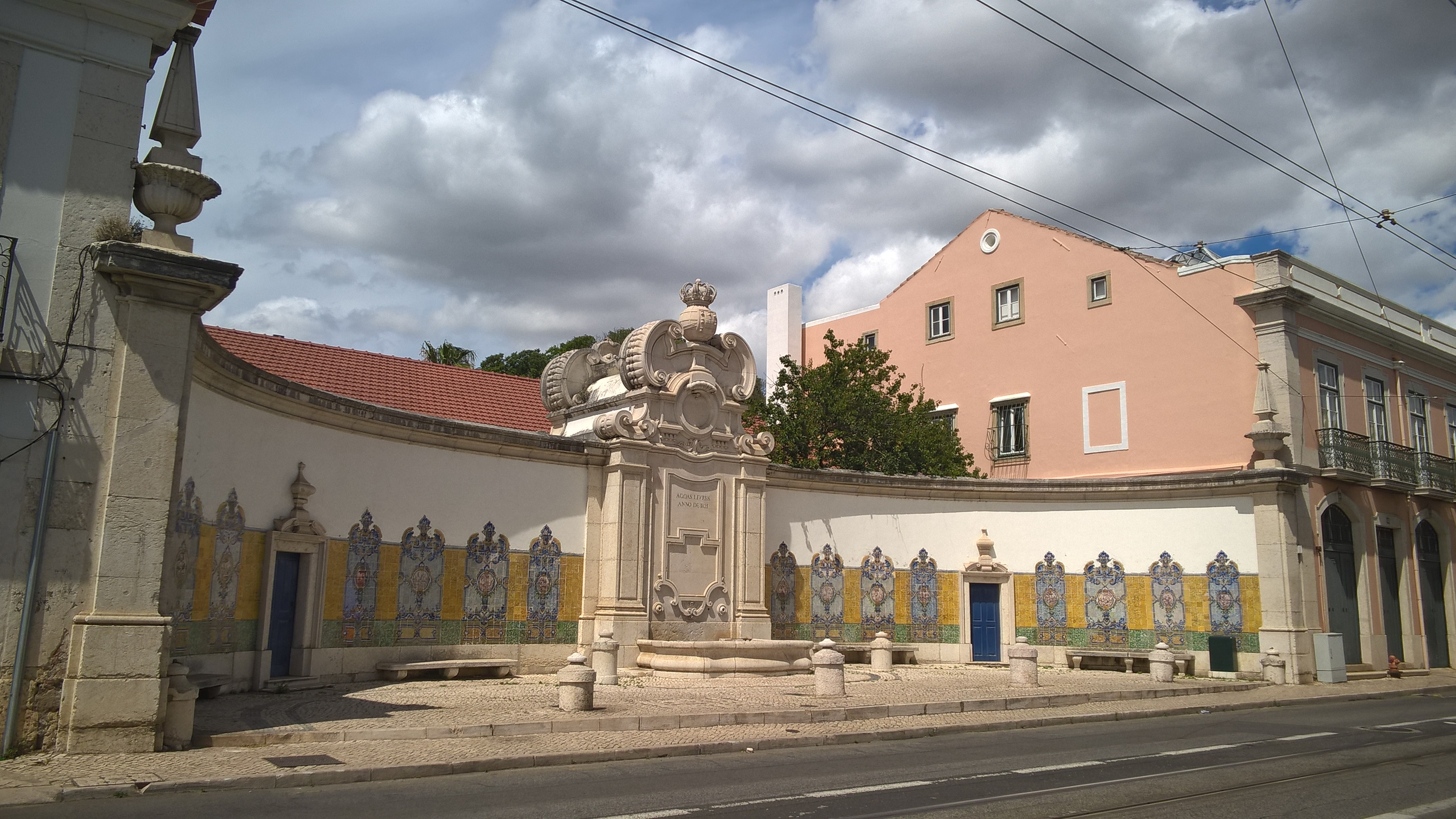
Chafariz da Junqueira in Rua da Junqueira, connecting street between Belém and Alcântara. The fountain, built in 1821, was connected to the Lisbon Aqueduct

After the French invasions, agriculture and industry were paralyzed. The Liberal Wars that followed worsened these conditions along the eastern portions of Lisbon, principally along the ravine between Alcântara and Pedrouços. Still, the accentuated industrialization continued to dominate the valley and lasted until the late 19th century, resulting in many small factories and warehouses, including numerous metal-stampers and tanneries.

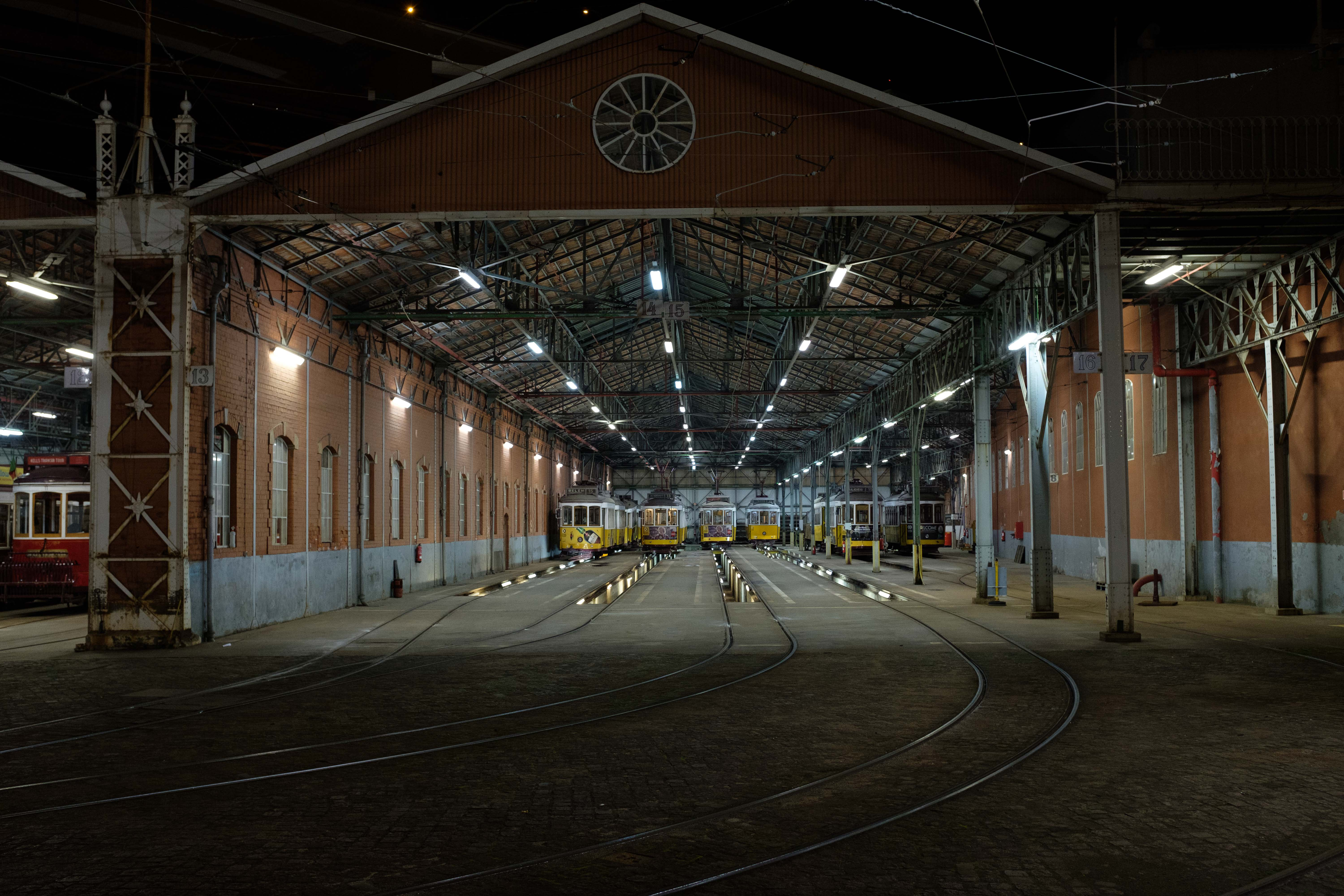
Carris "Santo Amaro Station" vehicle depot on Rua 1.º de Maio, which also houses the Museu da Carris

The development of Alcântara meant that, as part of the territorial reorganization of 8 April 1770, the freguesia of S. Pedro em Alcântara was created, through the transfer of the administrative headquarters of the ancient freguesia of S. Pedro em Alfama . In 1780 the territory of the freguesia was increased with areas east of the coastal area belonging to the freguesia of Senhor Jesus da Boa Morte; in 1959, this same territory was integrated into Prazeres. At the time of its establishment, 4,769 inhabitants lived in the freguesia. The establishment in the industrial activity area contributed to the gradual growth of the population, so much so that in 1801 it had risen to 9,830 units. Starting in 1840 the population stopped increasing significantly. Shortly before, in 1833, a cholera epidemic - the same that prompted the establishment of the Alto de São João Cemetery in Penha de França - had reduced the population to 6,627 units.

In 1807 it was occupied by General Jean-Andoche Junot during the invasion of Portugal conducted as part of the Peninsular War. In 1811 a public granary was built on its territory; in 1821 the Chafariz da Junqueira was built; in 1846 the Chafariz da Praça da Armada; shortly thereafter, a regular connection with Belém was created . The industrial sector continued to develop in Alcântara, particularly in the printing and dyeing sectors.

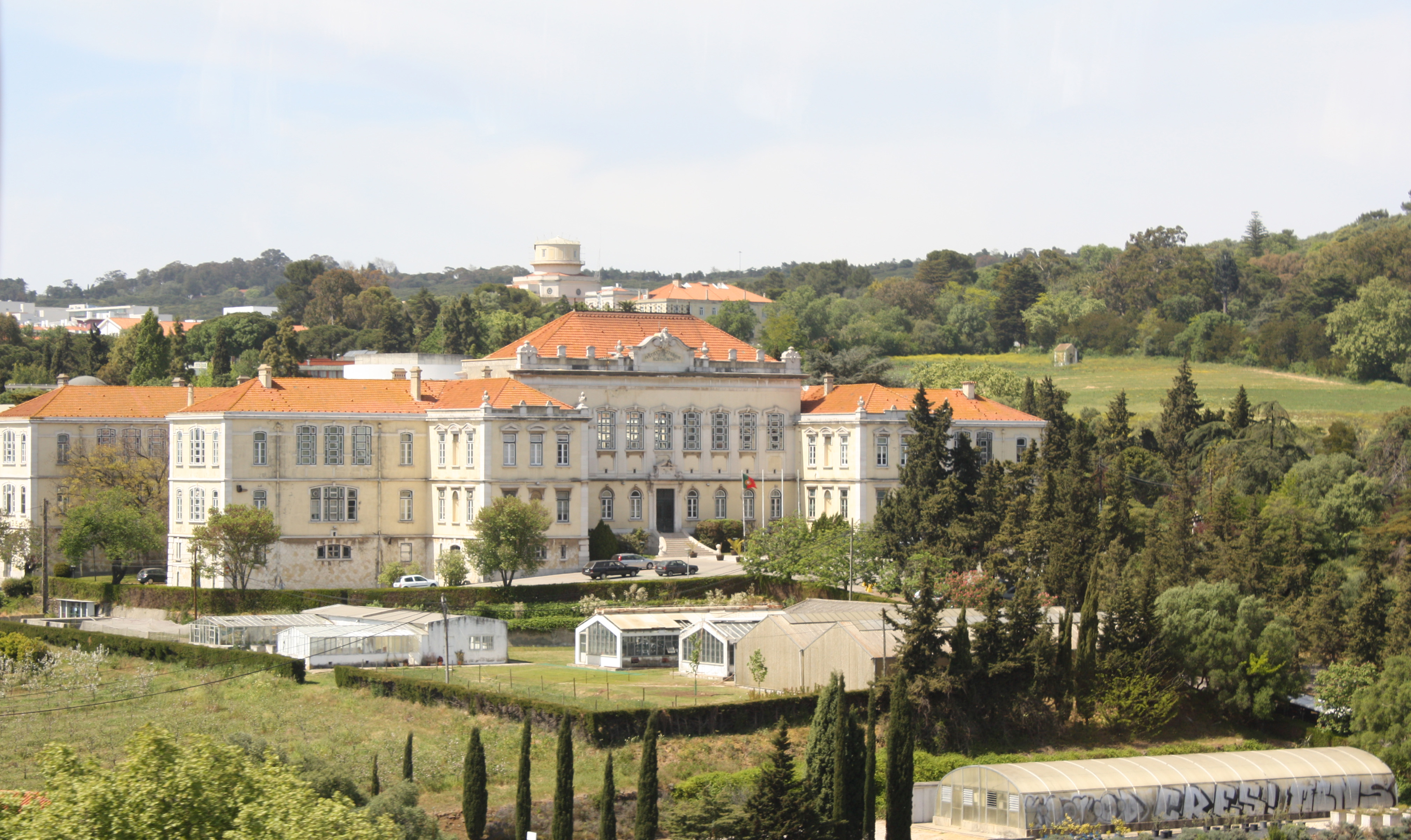
The Instituto Superior de Agronomia, located within the Tapada da Ajuda, was founded in 1853.

Between 1807 and 1824, members of the Ratton family constructed a porcelain factory in Calvario, and attempted to construct a mill powered by steam which was not successful. In 1839, the Rattons established an estate in Calvário alongside their Fábrica de Lanifícios Daupias de Pedro Daupias, which was under the management of Jácome Ratton. Near this factory, a textile factory, Companhia de Fiação de Tecidos Lisbonense, was also constructed (1846–1855). Since 1876, a great part of the urbanized part of Alcântara was delimited by Calçada da Tapada and Calçada de Santo Amaro in the north, and in the east and south by Rua de Alcântara, Largo do Calvário and Rua 1º de Maio.

During the middle of the 19th century, some factories linked to chemical production (soap, candles, olive and other oils) were built in the same area, transforming the area of Calvário from an area of farms, palaces and convents into an important industrial zone. The industrial area south of Largo do Calvário and the old Rua de São Joaquim were converted and expanded to take on the new roles.

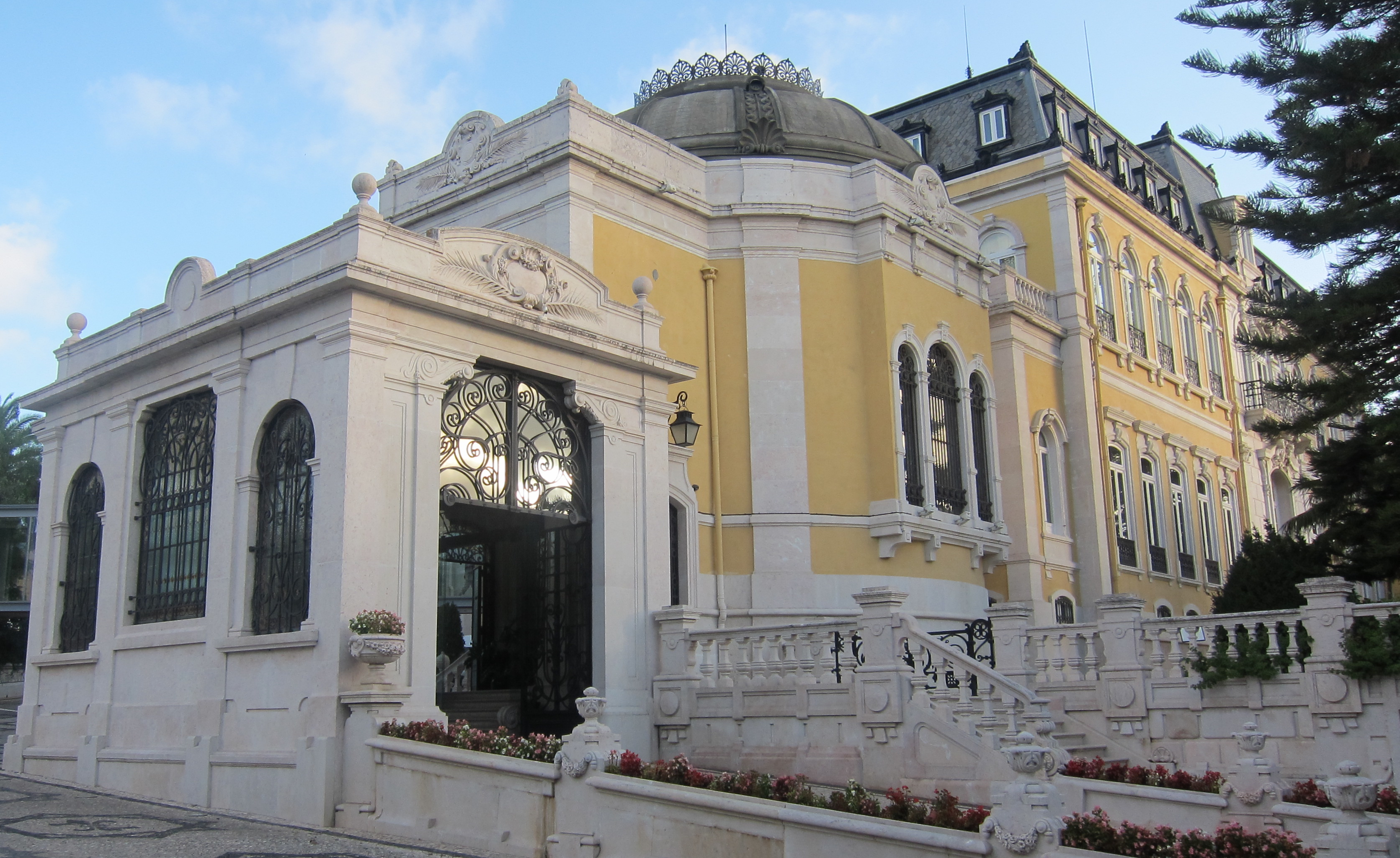
Pestana Palace, a luxury hotel housed in a noble palace built in 1905

The construction of the Estrada da Circunvalação de Lisboa, in 1852, which ran along the city limits divided the freguesia into two parts: Alcântara intramuros (this side of the ring road) and Alcântara extramuros . With the creation of the concelho (town hall) of Belém, Alcântara intramuros remained united with Lisbon, while Alcântara extramuros was united with Belém. However, with the territorial expansion of Lisbon up to Algés and the suppression of the municipality of Belém, the freguesia of Alcântara was reunified again. Despite the yellow fever epidemic of 1857, its population began to increase again so much so that, at the end of the 19th century, it had 22,745 inhabitants.

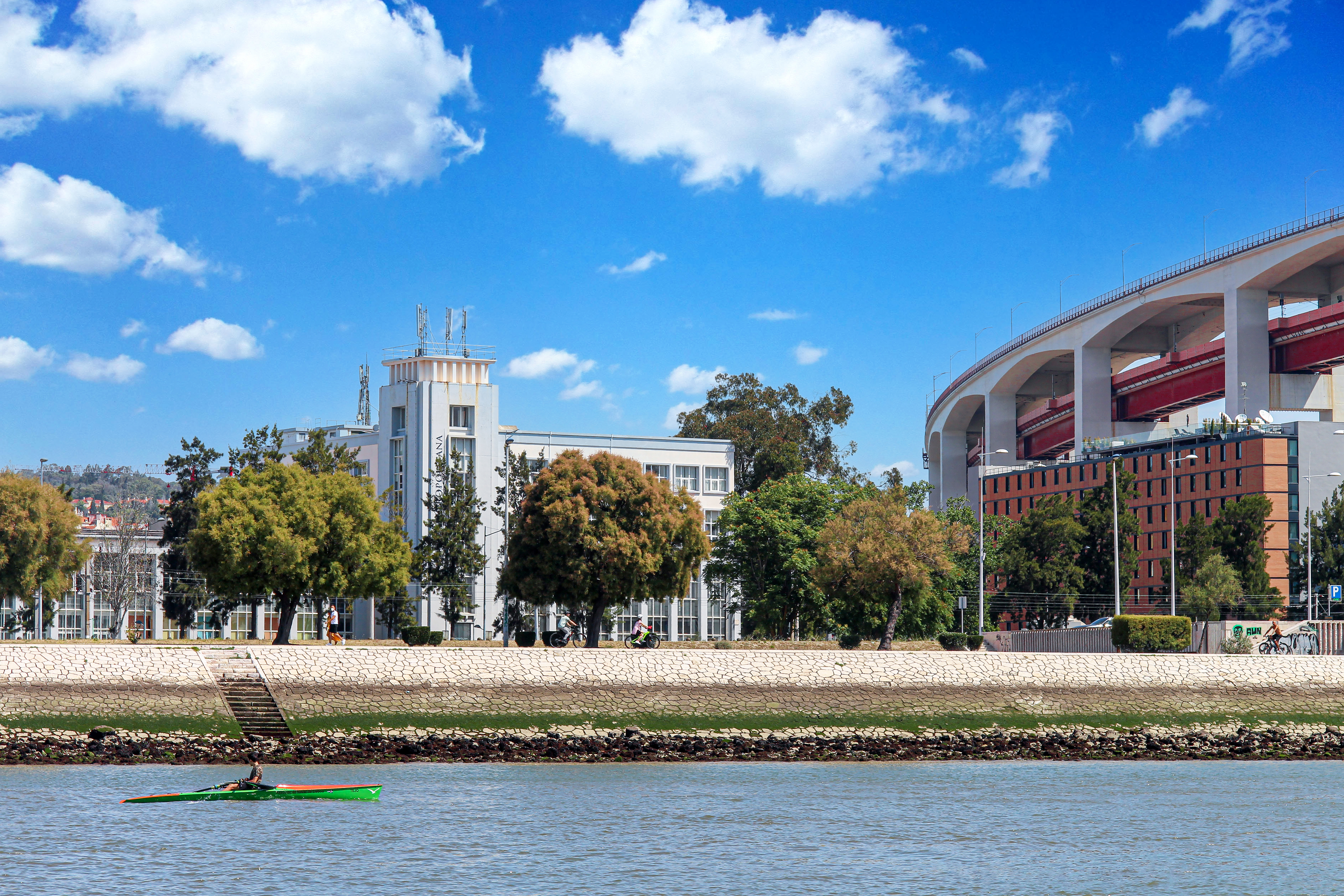
The Edifício da Standard Elétrica, an example of modernist industrial architecture, was built between 1945 and 1948 to a design by José Ângelo Cottinelli Telmo

The development of public transport contributed predominantly to this increase., in fact, public transport developed after Lisbon in 1860, when the area had many factories. Yet, until 1888, these services were out of range of many of the working-class of the area. The improvements in public transit contributed to the development of the bairro of Alcântara. In 1864, the Companhia de Carruagens Lisbonenses was operating in the freguesia, introducing the so-called Carros Americanos (horse-drawn trams) in 1870; in 1901 it was affected by the construction of the tram line that operated between Terreiro do Paço and Algés.

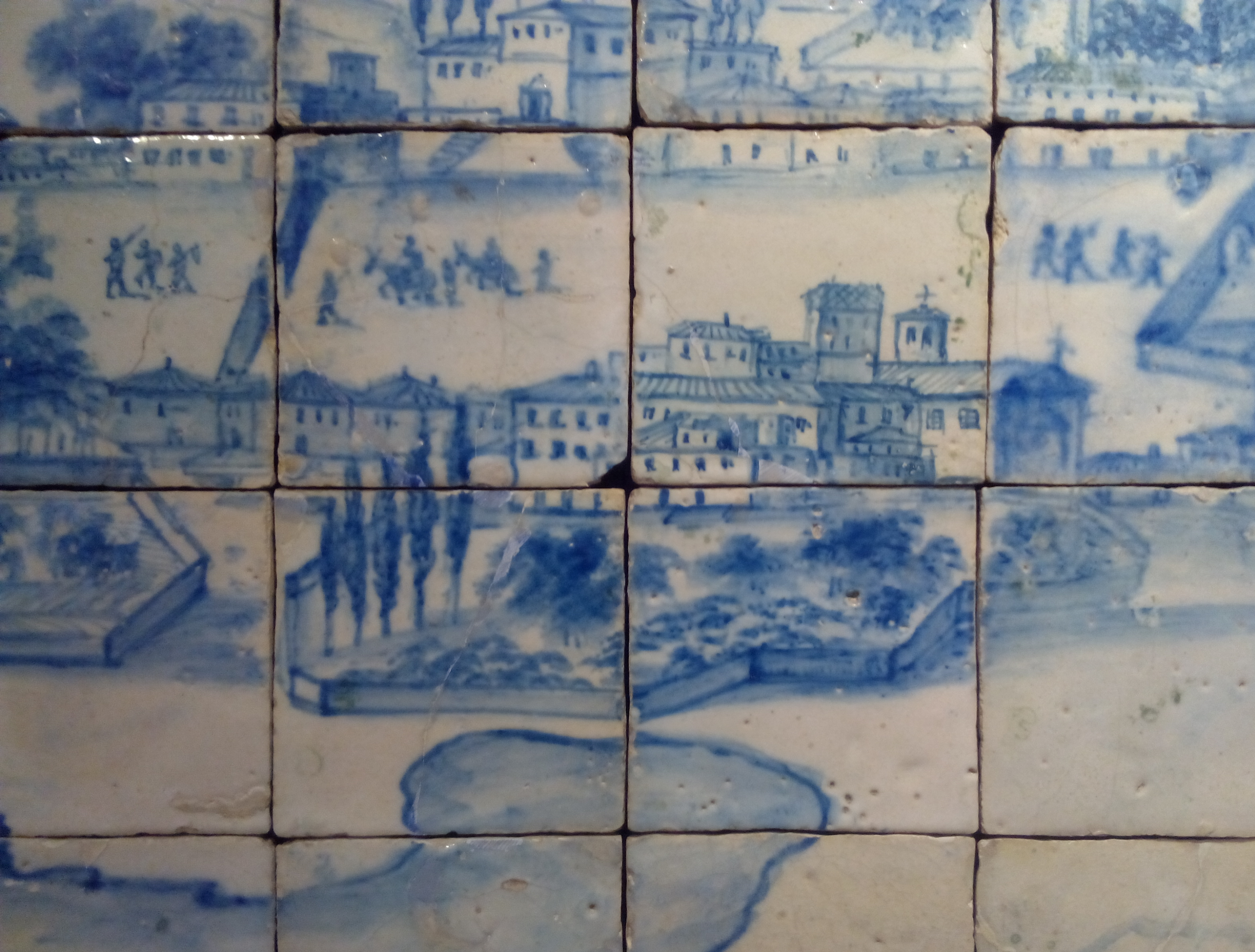
Convento das Flamengas and Palácio Real de Alcântara depicted in the Grande Panorama de Lisboa

The freguesia was also reached by the railway network in 1887, with the creation of the first section between Sintra and the Alcântara-Terra station . This line was extended in 1891 to Cascais, and also saw the construction of the Alcântara-Mar station . This project determined the need to stabilize and artificially expand the land along the banks of the Tagus, resulting in a territorial expansion of the freguesia. In fact, the rail-line was completed after public sanitation works along the beach in Alcântara (1876), which resulted in the recovery of an additional 500 meters of land from the Tagus River, which were quickly expropriated by factories, docks and warehouses. The new land was used not only for the railway, but also for the foundation of industrial complexes. The population began to concentrate in residential areas distinct from industrial areas such as Santo Amaro and Calvário .

Between 1884 and 1886, the bairros of Santo Amaro and Calvário began to develop as social housing, from lands reserved from the old Quinta da Ninfa. The lots were allocated to residents in commemoration of the 300 year anniversary of Luís Vaz de Camões.

The precarious nature of the economic conditions in the region resulted in several conflicts, including many strikes, conflicts and insurrections, such as the June 1872 event, that came to be known as the "A Pavorosa". Later, the Empresa Industrial Portuguesa, the largest and most modern metallurgical business until the 1920s, operated in Alcântara, which also created dissent and conflict. On various occasions, in 1886, in 1894 and most importantly in 1903 there were strikes, protests and conflicts between the workers and the residents of the region. The 1903 strike began on 7 December to protest the imposition of a foreign director. On 17 December the strikers, numbering hundreds, fought the police in Santo Amaro. Over time, this area has lost the old buildings, the stream and the laundry rooms where women went to do their laundry.

=== 20th and 21st centuries ===
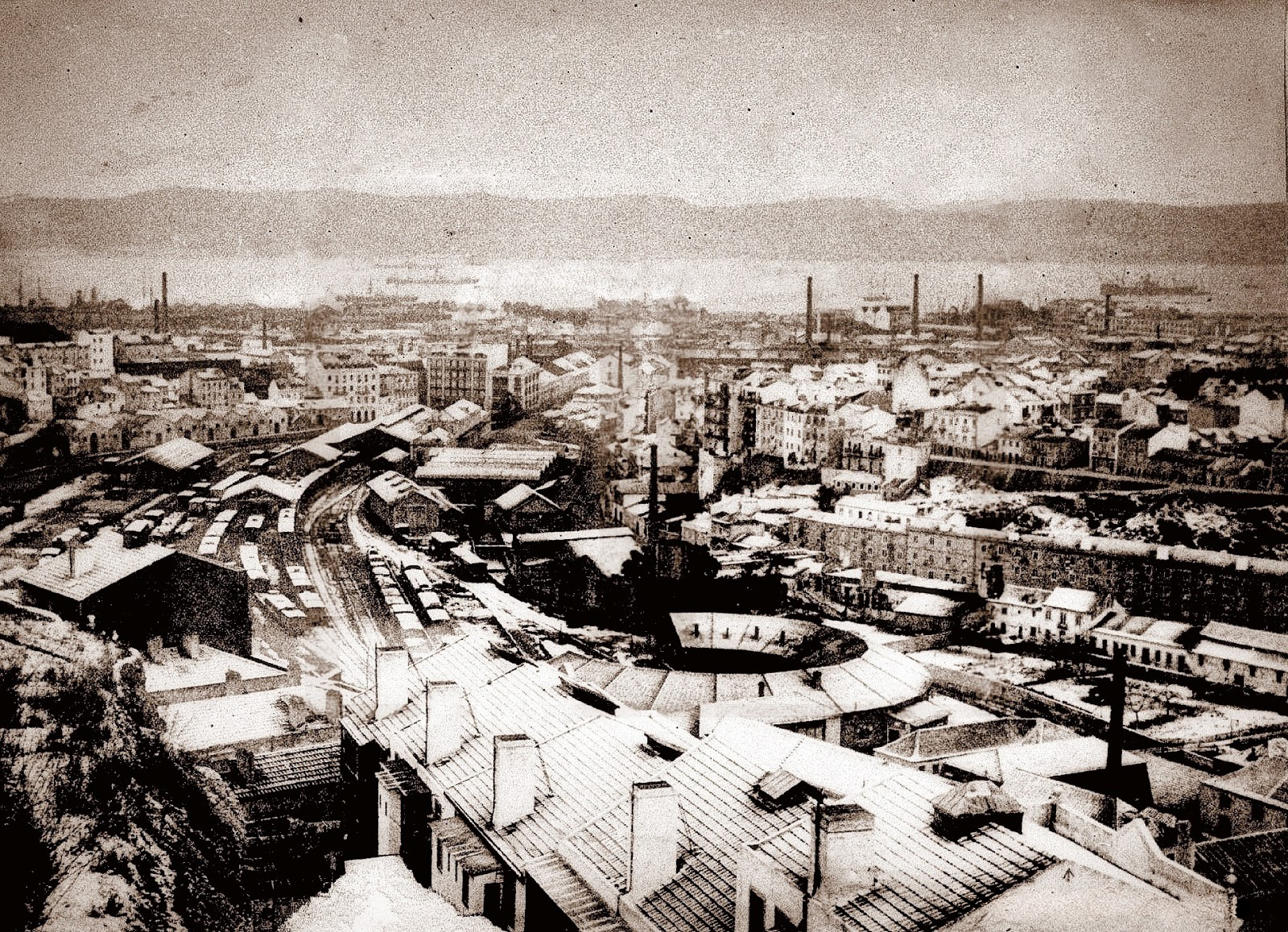
Snow in Alcântara in a photo from 1926

Alcântara was, at the beginning of the 20th century, a neighborhood of decidedly republican tendencies and home to groups conspiring to overthrow the Portuguese monarchy. After the proclamation of the Portuguese republic in 1910, the neighborhood was the scene of protests and strikes by local workers. Even during the Estado Novo period the neighborhood was a center of dissent against the regime.

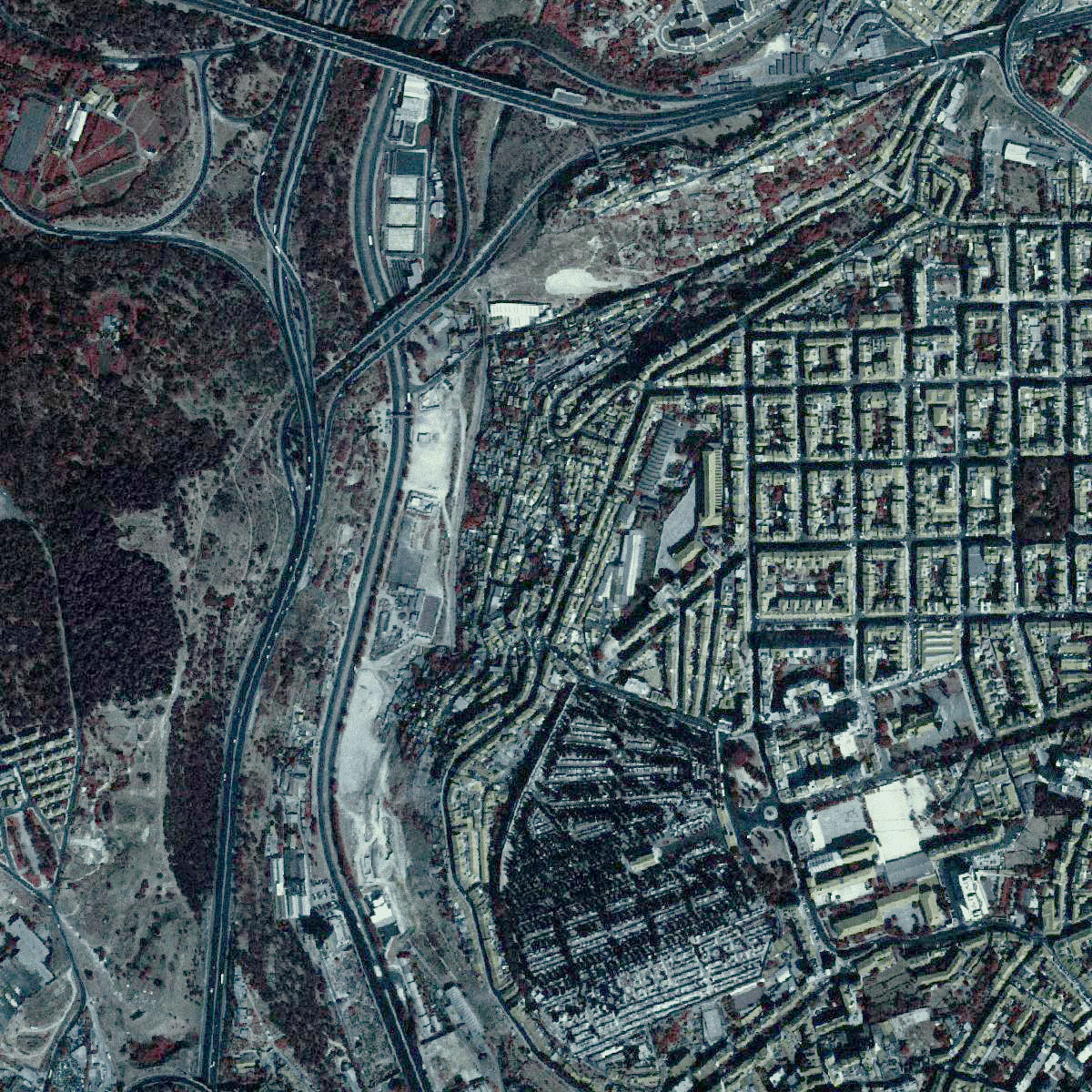
Casal Ventoso, bounded to the west by Avenida de Ceuta and to the east by Campo de Ourique, in a 1995 orthophotograph

During the 20th century various interventions modified the appearance of the Alcântara. Of particular note among these were the reforestation of the Parque Florestal de Monsanto (1937); the construction of the Alvito neighborhood (1936 - 1937); of the Estação Marítima de Alcântara (1943); of the Avenida de Ceuta (1944 - 1951); of the exhibition space of the Feira Internacional de Lisboa (1957); the inauguration of the Estádio da Tapadinha (1945).

The construction of the 25 de Abril Bridge and its access roads led to the need to demolish some homes and relocate some of the neighbourhood's inhabitants, who were housed in the Bairro do Relógio, in the north-eastern part of Lisbon (currently part of Marvila). At the end of the 20th century, Alcântara suffered a reduction in population, caused both by aging and by the transfer of inhabitants to peripheral areas of the city.

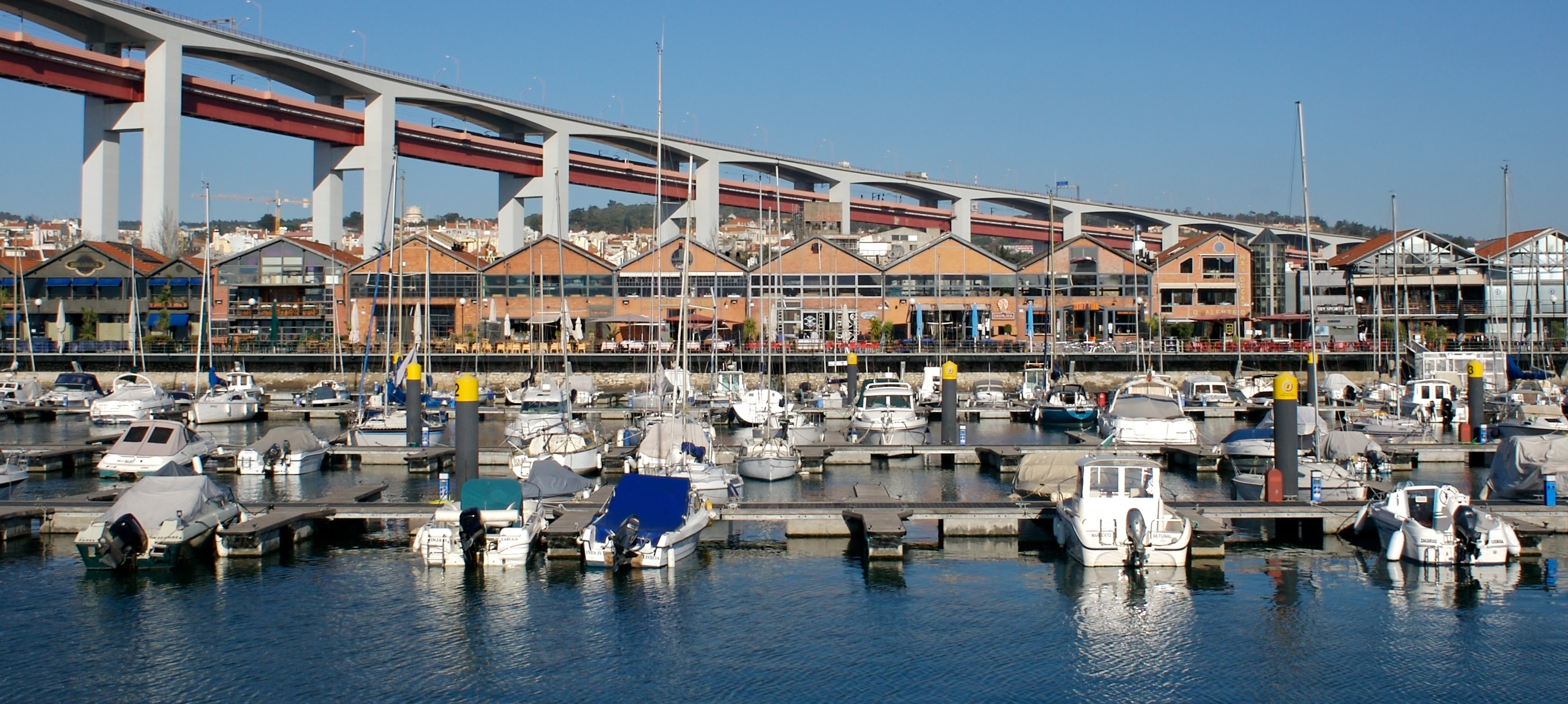
Santo Amaro Docks, former warehouses converted to commercial spaces in the 1990s.

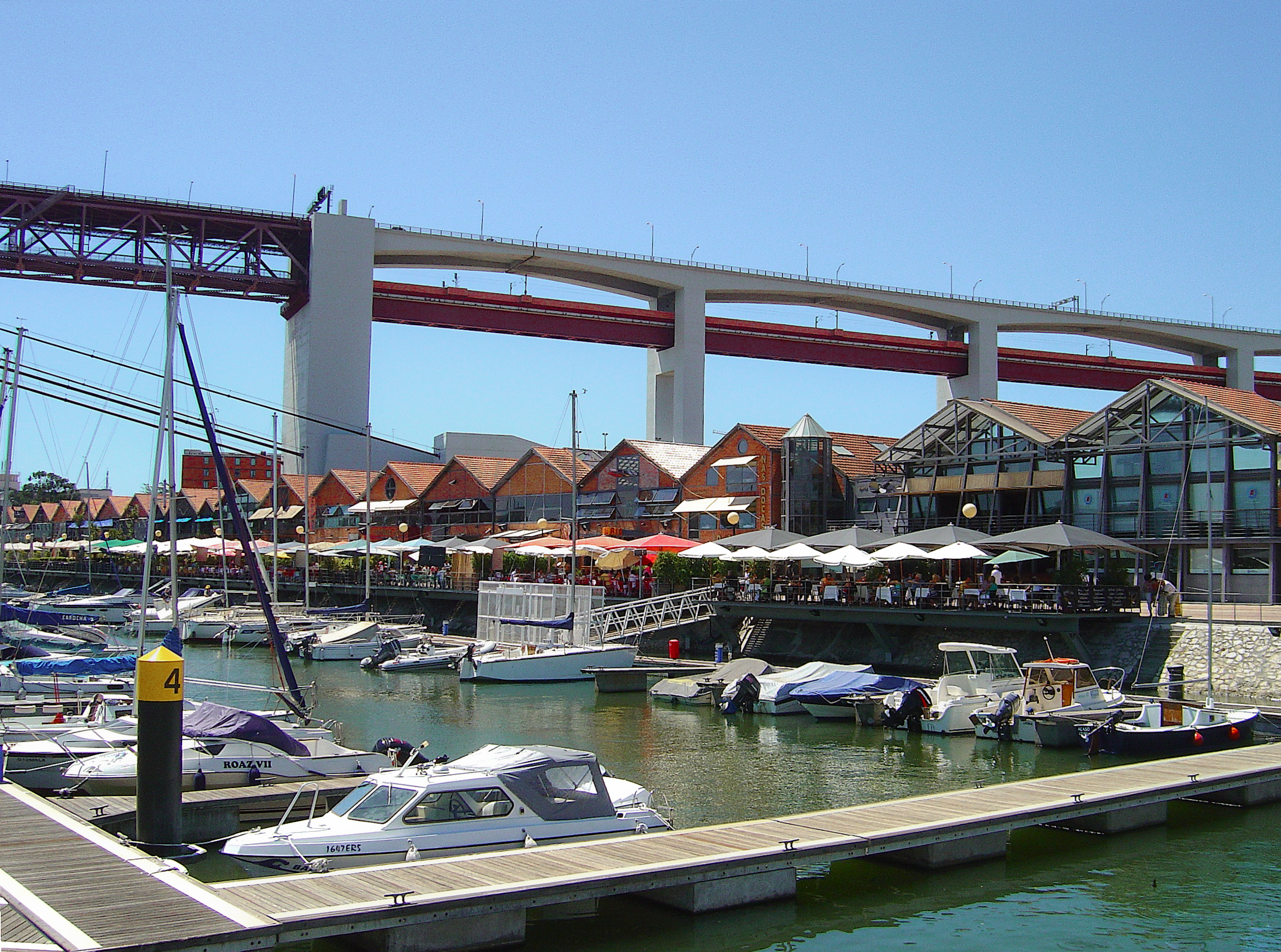
Docas de Lisboa

During the 20th century, the area between the Alcântara valley and the Cemitério dos Prazeres in the Campo de Ourique area was affected by illegal constructions which gave rise to the Casal Ventoso neighbourhood . The latter became known between the 70s and 90s as the most important drug dealing place in the Portuguese capital, in a period in which Portugal was facing an emergency linked to drug addiction and the high incidence of HIV-positive people. Starting from 1999, the population of the neighborhood was rehoused in new homes and a redevelopment of the area began, which saw the demolition of Casal Ventoso and the construction of public housing . These measures, combined with the implementation of the policy known as Estratégia Nacional de Luta Contra a Droga (ENLCD) have led to a reduction and greater control of the phenomenon of drug dealing, although without eliminating it.

Around the early 1990s, Alcântara started to become a place for pubs and discotheques, mainly because its outer area is mostly commercial, and the noise generated at night, and the "movida", would not disturb its residents. Today, some of these areas are slowly being taken over by loft developments and new apartments that can profit from its river views and central location.

== Politics and Administration ==
The civil parish, as previously stated, was established on the 8 April 1770. After the aforementioned 1780 administrative reform, a consequence of the 1755 earthquake, Alcântara would only see its borders changed once more during the Liberal Reforms which entered into effect by decree on the 11 September 1852. The territory attached to Lisbon was divided into municipalities and the city's new municipal limits were marked by the recently delimited Estrada da Circunvalação de Lisboa, whose first marker was the Alcântara brook. This therefore split the parish into two - Alcântara intramuros and extramuros (within and outside the walls, respectively) and put the latter within the municipality of Santa Maria de Belém - they were later rejoined in the 1895 administrative and judicial reform of the Lisbon region, which namely set most of the modern municipal border and extinguished the municipality of Belém. In the 20th century, the traditional eastern part of Alcântara would be excluded from the civil parish once more, as written in the 1959 administrative reform decree, including it in Prazeres (now Estrela). Alcântara was not affected radically by the recent 2012 reform ceding only small territories.

Alcântara has its civil parish headquarters at Rua dos Lusíadas, 13; a 20th-century corner building on the intersection with Rua Leão de Oliveira, notable for sitting directly under the viaduct of the 25 de Abril Bridge, next to the local market and the overall heart of the neighbourhood.

=== Elections ===
Local democratic elections were held in Portugal for the first time in 1976. The number of members elected has varied, depending on electoral reforms and the variation of population - the first election had 15 assembly mandates up for grabs, which grew for 1979 and 1982 to 28 members, before being reduced to 19 in 1985. This value was reviewed ahead of the 2001 election which reduced it to thirteen members, a value which remains until today.

Alcântara is one of the most consistent parishes in terms of turnout in the city, having dropped below the halfway line twice in 1997 and in 2013. A neighbourhood of working class traditions and of aforementioned historically revolutionary tendencies, the local elections have historically been mostly won by the left-wing parties. However, during Democracy, it has also been a closely contested between the Communist coalitions (PCP, currently a part of CDU), the Socialist Party (PS) and the right-wing Social Democratic Party (PSD), the only three parties to have participated in all elections since 1976.

Full summary of local elections for Alcântara (Mandates won in brackets)
Election	PSR	UDP	FEPU APU CDU	PS	L	BE	PAN	MDP/ CDE	IL	PPD/ PSD	CDS-PP	PC, PPM	MPT	A	CH	MA (GC)	GDUPs	PCTP-MRPP	PRD	ADN	I/B	Turnout
1976			29.89 (5)	37.69 (6)				FEPU		11.45 (2)	13.35 (2)						4.58	0.75			2.29	69.23
1979		1.92	33.57 (9)	23.58 (7)				APU		38.83 (11)								0.77			1.32	78.04
1982			34.23 (10)	28.28 (8)				APU		33.97 (9)								0.79			2.74	75.34
1985		1.47	41.92 (9)	17.82 (3)				APU		36.45 (9)											2.34	61.42
1989		0.72	58.22 (12)					PS/CDU/ MDP		36.45 (7)									2.75		3.34	53.92
1993	64.30 (13)									25.61 (5)	6.45 (1)										3.64	52.71
1997		64.54 (13)								32.12 (6)											2.34	45.70
2001			53.21 (8)			4.59				32.45 (5)	6.32	PSD/ PPM									2.99	54.28
2005			31.39 (5)	24.61 (3)		7.69 (1)				27.70 (4)	3.96										2.65	51.27
2009			29.84 (4)	29.18 (4)		7.35 (1)				30.82 (4)											2.81	52.66
2013			19.49 (3)	33.57 (5)		*				26.46 (4)		1.24	PSD coal.			10.66 (1)					6.79	46.62
2017			9.76 (1)	58.62 (10)		5.53				11.56 (1)	10.83 (1)										3.69	53.52
2021			9.33 (1)	53.65 (8)		5.32			6.23 (1)	18.75 (3)					3.77						2.94	51.79
2025			8.15 (1)	47.99 (7)					31.51 (4)						9.32 (1)					0.50	2.53	56.03
Source: CNE, STAPE/DGAI/SGMAI; *Note, 2013 - BE chose not to campaign and supported the Citizens Group. This group officially appears in results as the roman numeral VI.

== Landmarks ==
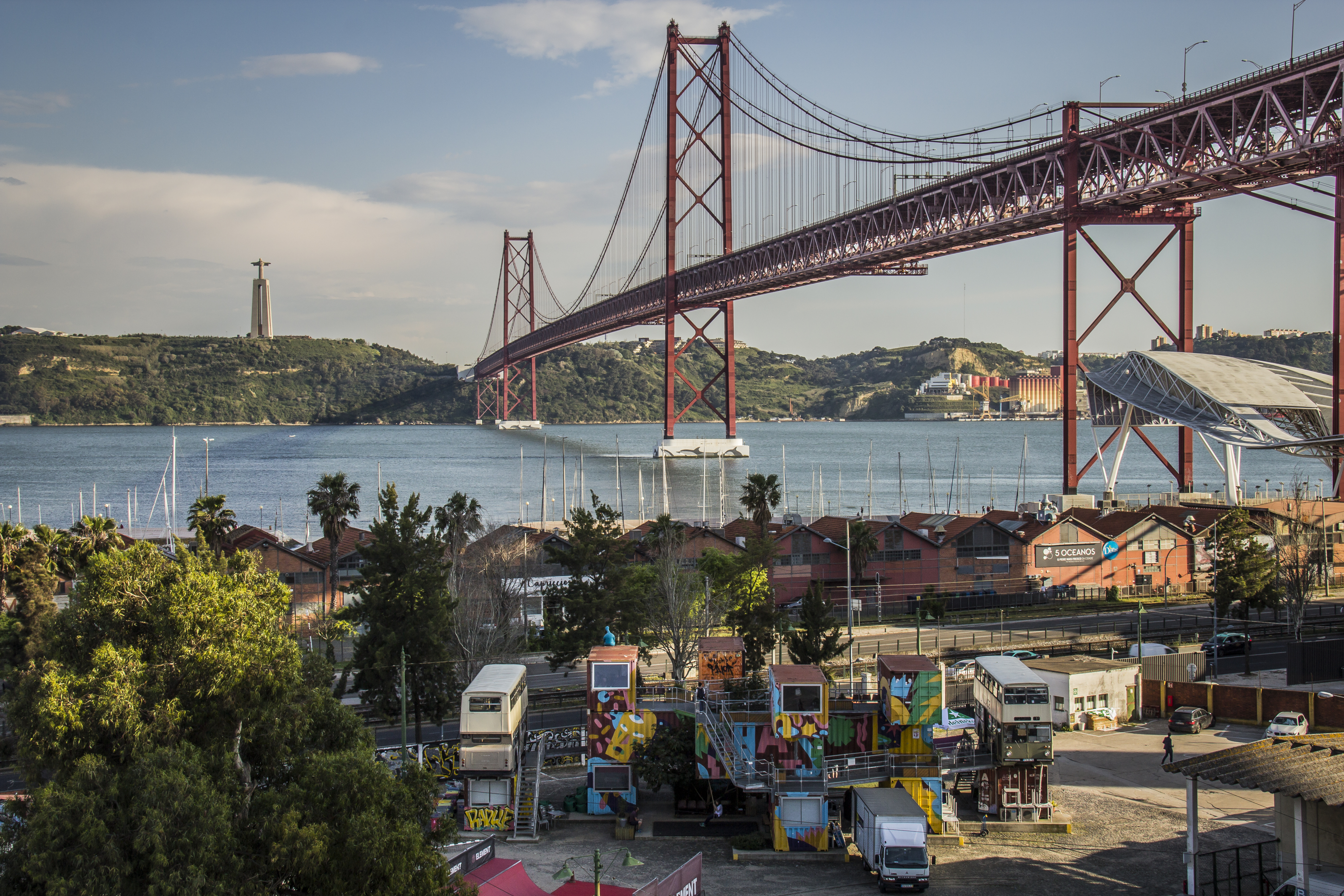
The 25th April Bridge seen from Alcântara

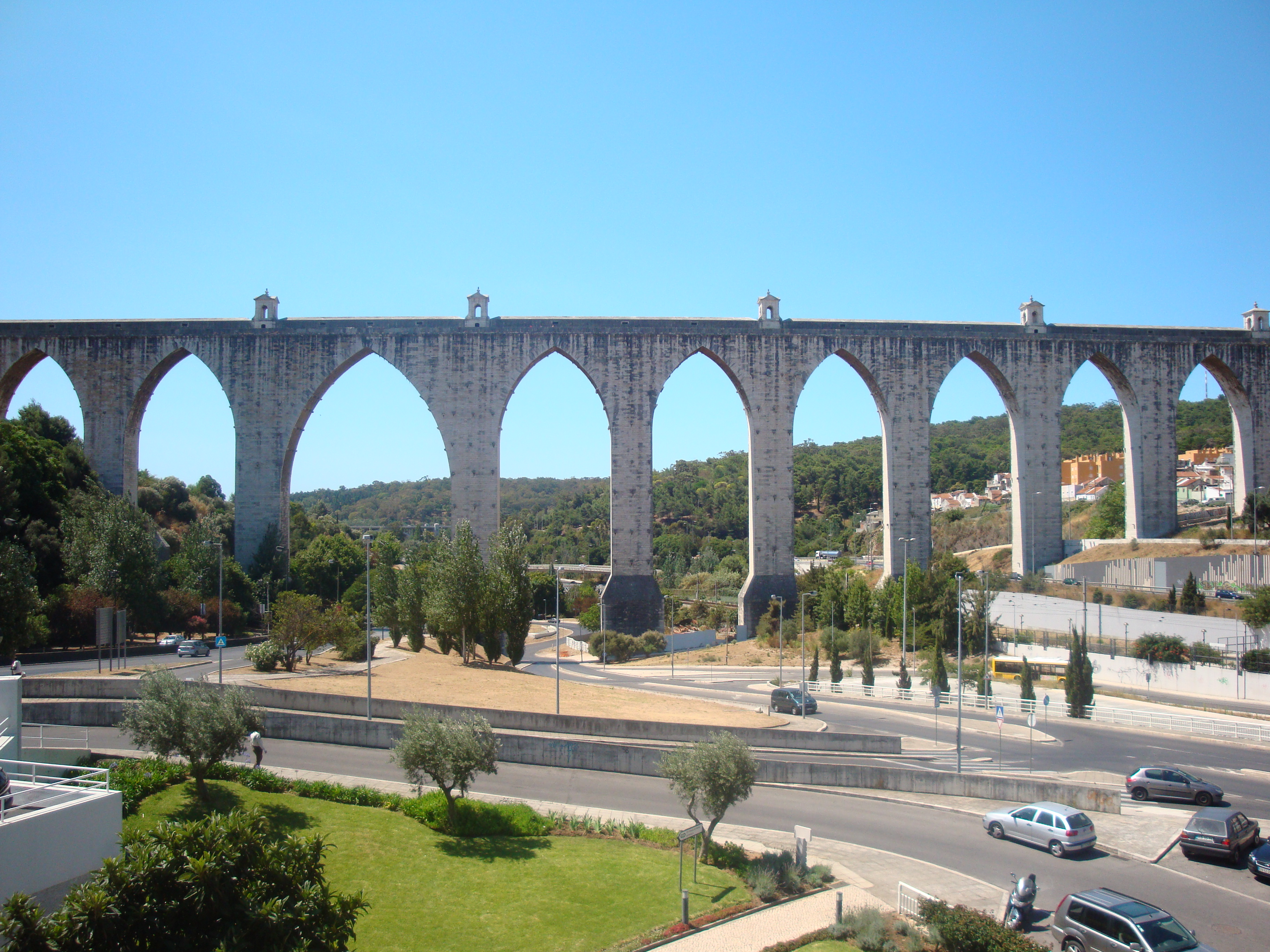
The Aqueduto das Águas Livres crosses the Alcântara valley, today the site of the route of the Avenida de Ceuta, a communication route located on the border between the freguesias of Alcântara and Estrela

The parish of Alcântara is rich in architectural heritage. Churches and palaces were built over time. Of the many buildings, the following stand out:

- Former building of the Marquês de Pombal Industrial School and Fonseca Benevides Secondary School
- Edifício da Companhia de Fiação e Tecidos Lisbonense and complex
- Edifício da Standard Eléctrica
- Tapada da Ajuda (intra-mural complex), housing the ISA School of Agronomy, the Lisbon Astronomical Observatory and several other noteworthy buildings

=== Palatial and residential ===
- Burnay Palace (Palácio Burnay), also known as the Patriarchs' Palace (Palácio dos Patriarcas)
- Condes da Ponte Palace, which houses part of the Carris Museum and the Carris headquarters, within Santo Amaro Station.
- Ega Palace (Palácio {dos Condes} da Ega), also known as Palácio do Pátio do Saldanha
- Fiúza Palace
- Junqueira House (Casa da Junqueira) also known as Palacete Polignac de Barros, current Embassy of the Sovereign Military Order of Malta
- Palacete Conde de Burnay, current home of the municipal José Dias Coelho Alcântara Library (Not to be confused with the palace of the same name).
- Palacete (dos Condes) da Ribeira Grande, now the MACAM - Museu de Arte Contemporânea Armando Martins - former Escola Secundária Rainha D. Amélia
- Palacete dos Condes da Ponte/Palacete Ponte, former HQ of the Port of Lisbon Administration (not to be confused with the palace of the same name)
- Pessanha Palace (Palácio/Palacete Pessanha, sometimes de Pessanha Valada)
- Sabugosa Palace and gardens
- Quinta das Águias or Quinta de Diogo de Mendonça or Quinta do Visconde da Junqueira or Quinta do Professor Lopo de Carvalho or Quinta dos Côrte-Real
- Quinta or Jardim do Monte do Carmo
- Vale Flor Palace, currently the Pestana Palace Hotel

=== Religious ===
- Church and Convent of Flamengas
- Church and Convent of the Calvary (/of Calvário)
- Church of Saint Peter in Alcântara
- Santo Amaro Chapel
