= Royal Palace of Alcântara =

Portuguese royal family residence in Alcântara

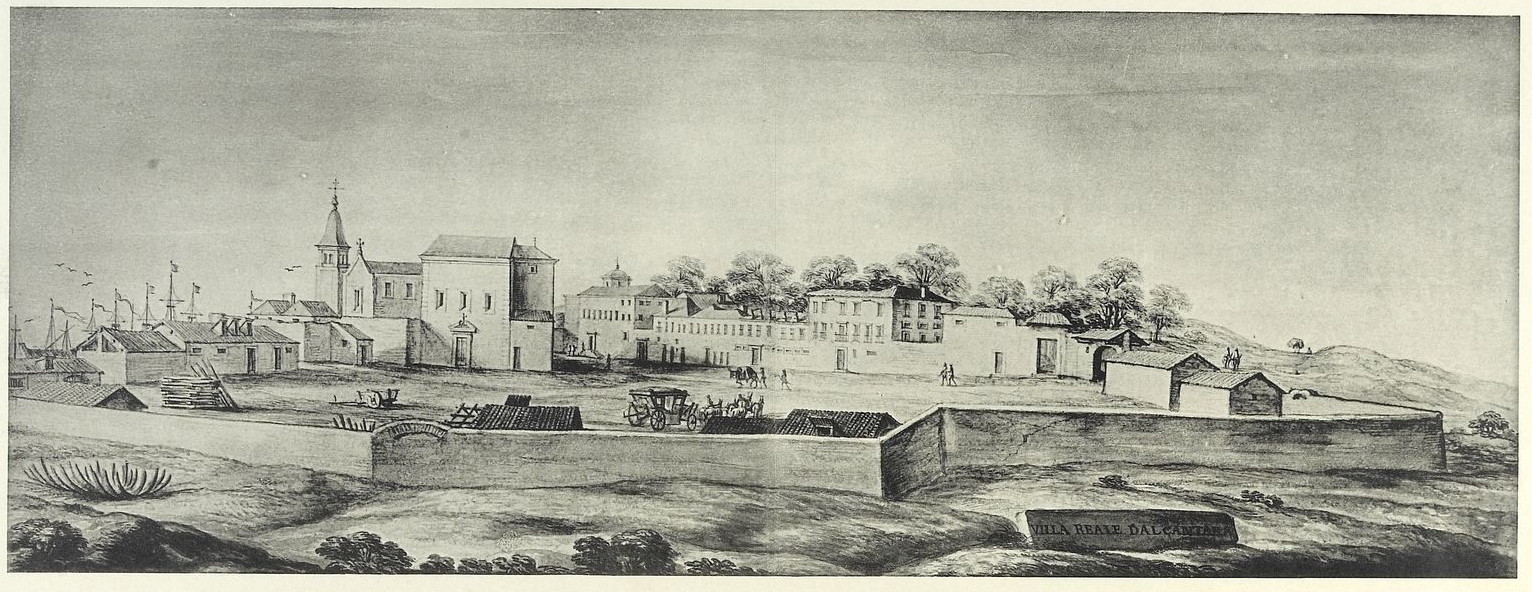
Engraving of the Royal Palace of Alcântara in 1669 by Pier Maria Baldi

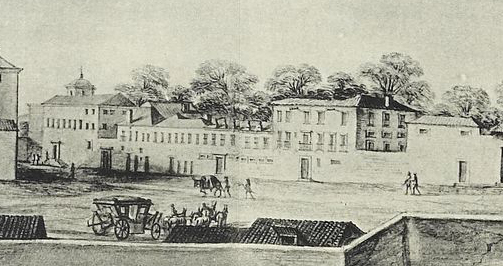
Detail of the Pier Maria Baldi engraving showing the Royal Palace of Alcântara

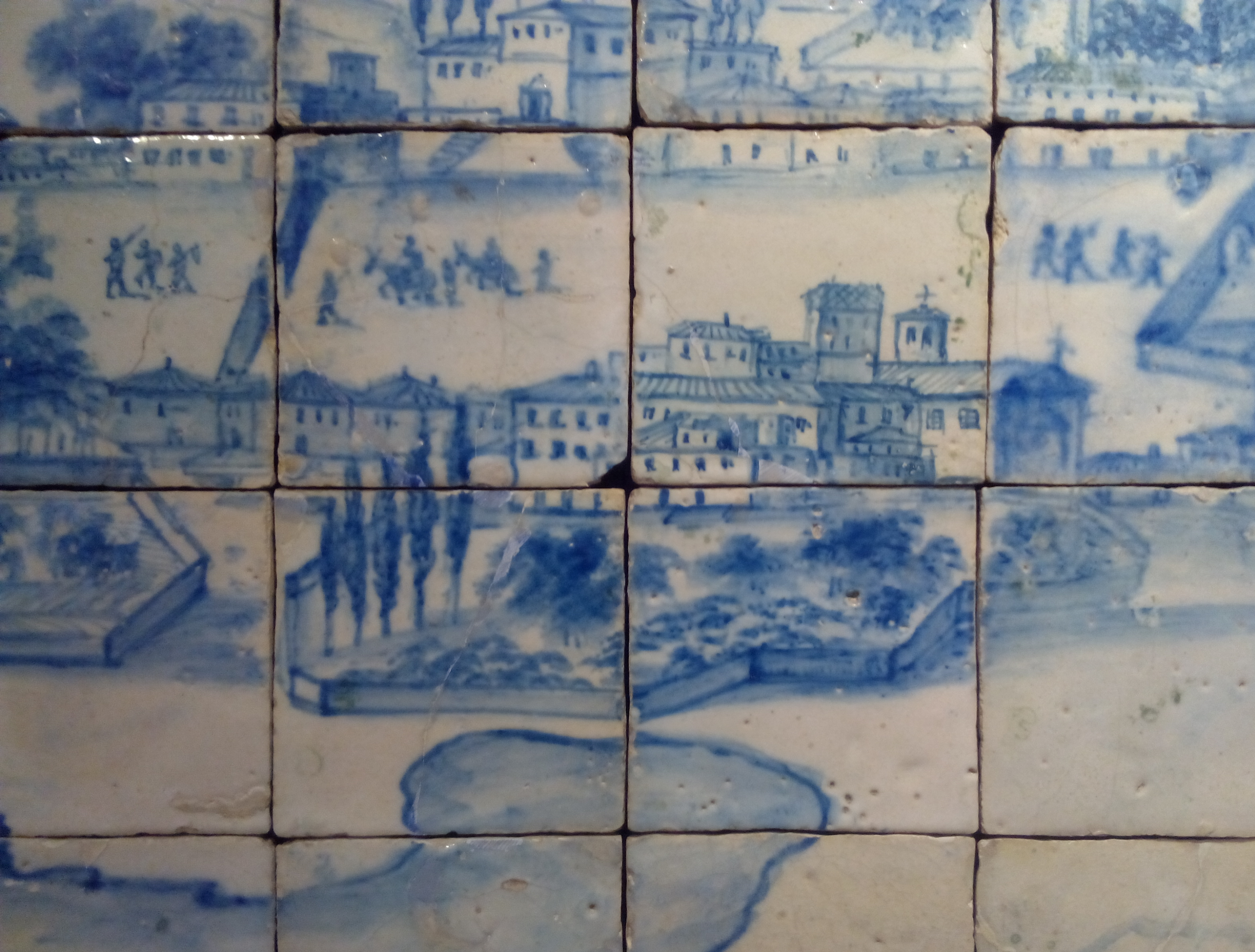
Tiles in the Flamengas monastery showing the Royal Palace of Alcântara

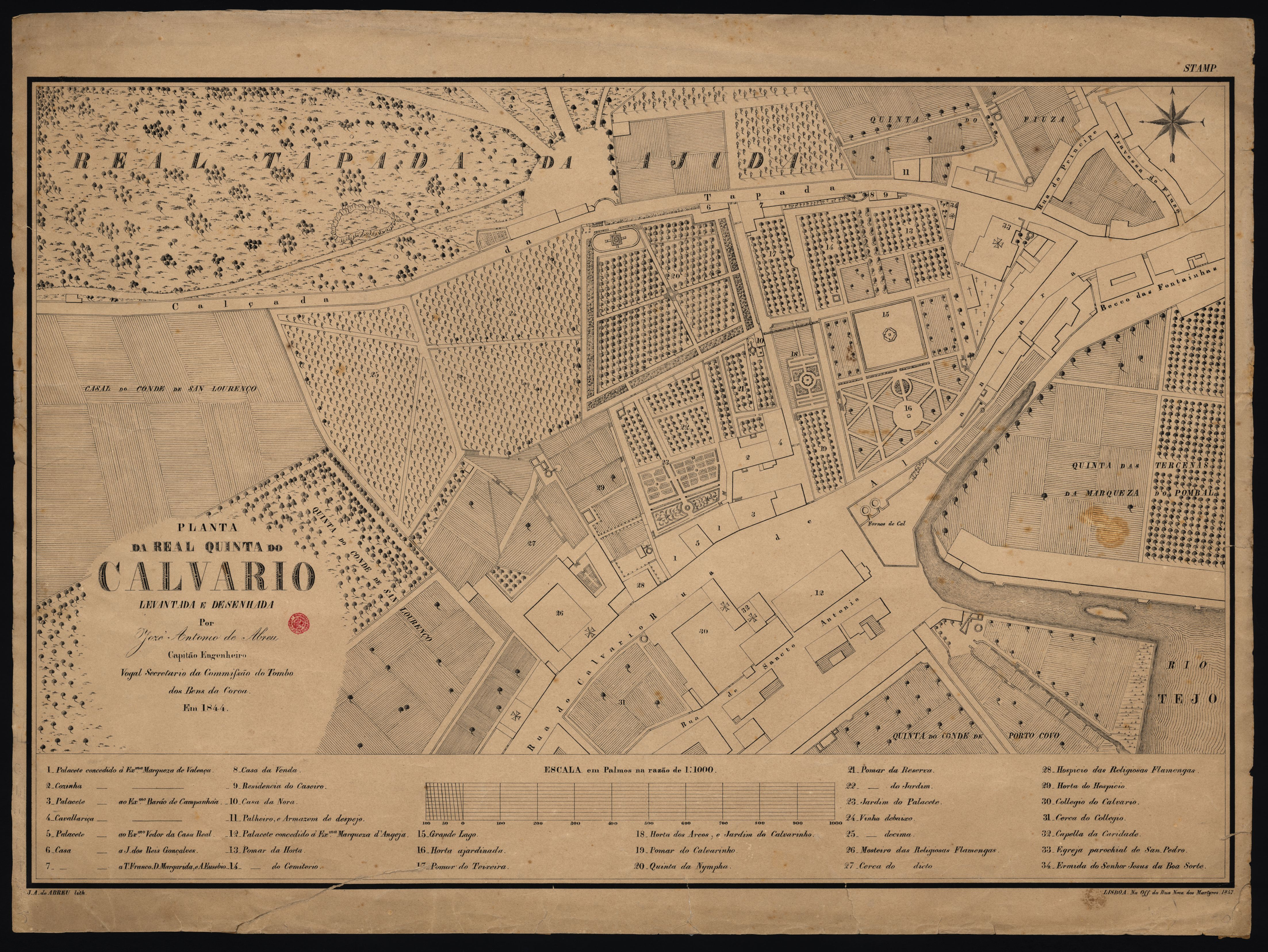
Map of the Royal Palace of Alcântara estate in 1847 by José Antonio de Abreu

The Royal Palace of Alcântara (Portuguese: Palácio Real de Alcântara or Portuguese: Real Quinta de Alcântara or Portuguese: Paço do Calvário) was a residence of the Portuguese royal family in Alcântara, a district in western Lisbon. The palace was constructed in the 17th century. After being heavily damaged by the 1755 Lisbon earthquake, it was restored, but no longer used by the royal family, and was demolished in the 19th century for urban development needs. Today, only part of the stable block is left.

== History ==
Originally, the Alcântara estate belonged to a wealthy merchant, named João Baptista Revelasco. However, as he was heavily indebted to the royal treasury, the estate was confiscated from him in 1602. King Philip II of Spain and Portugal (1527-1598) decided to construct here a summer lodge, where he could escape from the hustle and bustle at the royal court in the Ribeira Palace. He engaged the architect Teodósio de Frias to design the palace. Although the lodge was modest, the palace was known for its gardens, which were decorated with fountains, waterfalls and statues. Further, the visitors to the gardens could enjoy magnificent views over the Tagus river.

The first Braganza kings John IV (1604-1656), Afonso VI (1643-1683) and Peter II (1648-1706) were very fond of the palace and its gardens. King Afonso VI even changed his residence from the Ribeira Palace to the Alcântara palace.

The palace was heavily damaged by the 1755 Lisbon earthquake. It was rebuilt, but it lost its attractiveness. At the end of the eighteenth century, the palace was granted to Francisco José Dias, who set up a textile factory in the buildings. In 1808, when the concession ended, the palace returned to the crown, which decided to use it as free housing for the widows of the Royal Household.

In 1876, due to urban development needs, the royal family decided to sell the estate and its old and ruined palace. The gardens were replaced by new buildings and streets, creating a new neighbourhood, named ‘Bairro do Calvário’. Today, only a part of the royal stables of the royal palace has survived.
