= Burnay Palace =

Coordinates: 38.6999283°N 9.1846152°W

- Palácio Burnay (Portuguese)
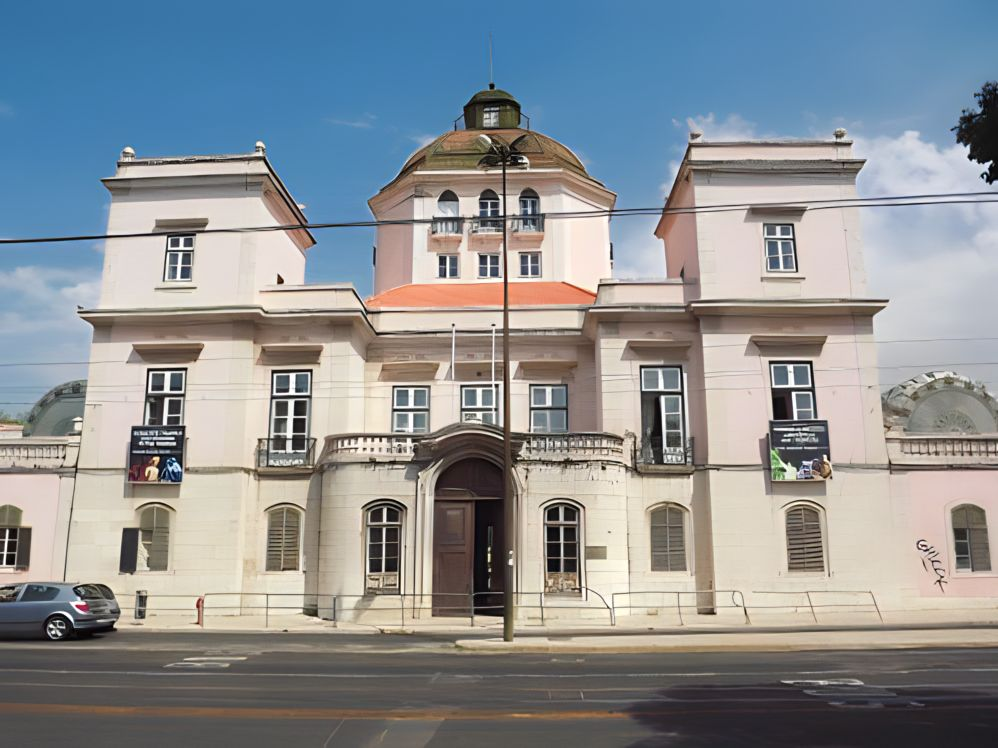
- Burnay Palace

- Location within Portugal
- Location: Lisbon, Portugal

Site notes
- Governing body: Technical University of Lisbon

Portuguese National Monument
- Official name: Palácio Burnay, Seus Anexos e Jardim
- Type: Property of Interest

Burnay Palace (Portuguese: Palácio Burnay) is a palace in the Alcântara parish in Lisbon, Portugal.

== History ==
The palace was constructed by Vasco César de Meneses between 1701 and 1734. Later purchased by Henrique Burnay, 1st Count of Burnay, the palace has since undergone changes and restoration works in the nineteenth century and more recently in the early 1940s.

The palace is also called by the Palace of the Patriarchs because it was previously the official summer residence of the Patriarchs of Lisbon.

The palace is currently the seat of Rectory Services and Social Actions of the Technical University of Lisbon. As of early 2024 the palace is not being maintained. It has been vandalized and the interior robbed.

The Portuguese Directorate-General for Cultural Heritage (DGPC) has rated the palace as a Property of Interest since 1982.

== Gallery ==
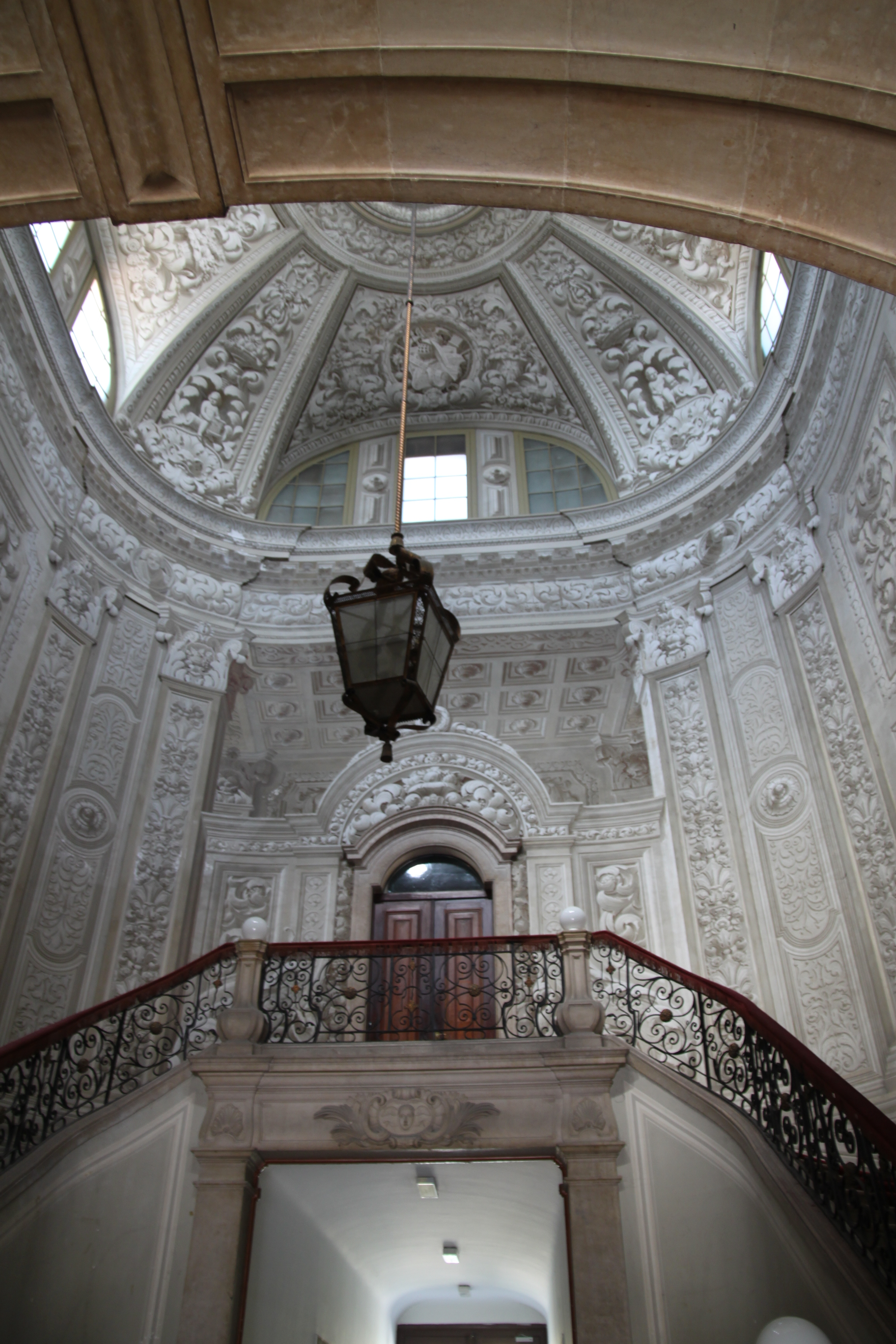
Trompe l'oeil of the main staircase

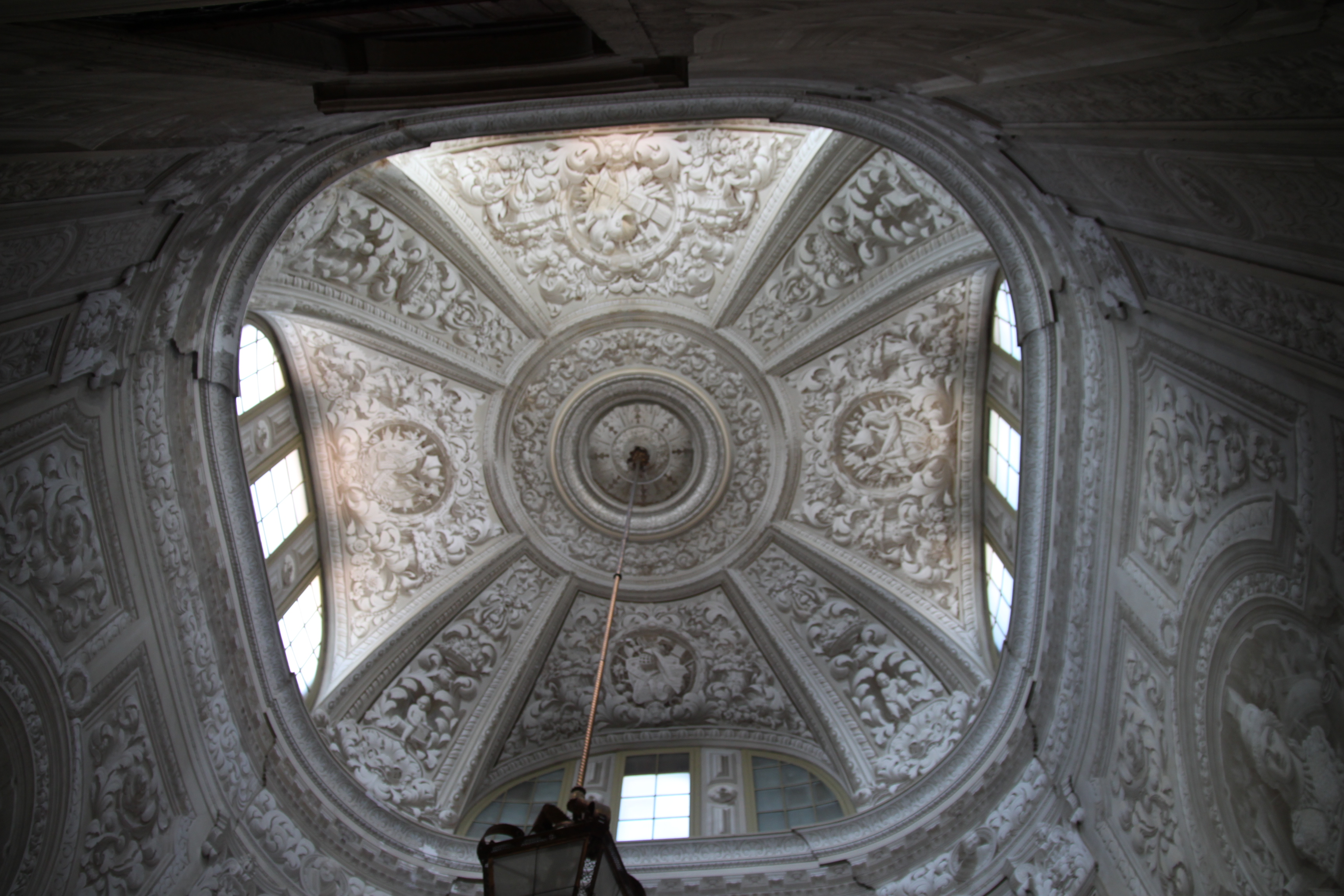
Decorated ceiling

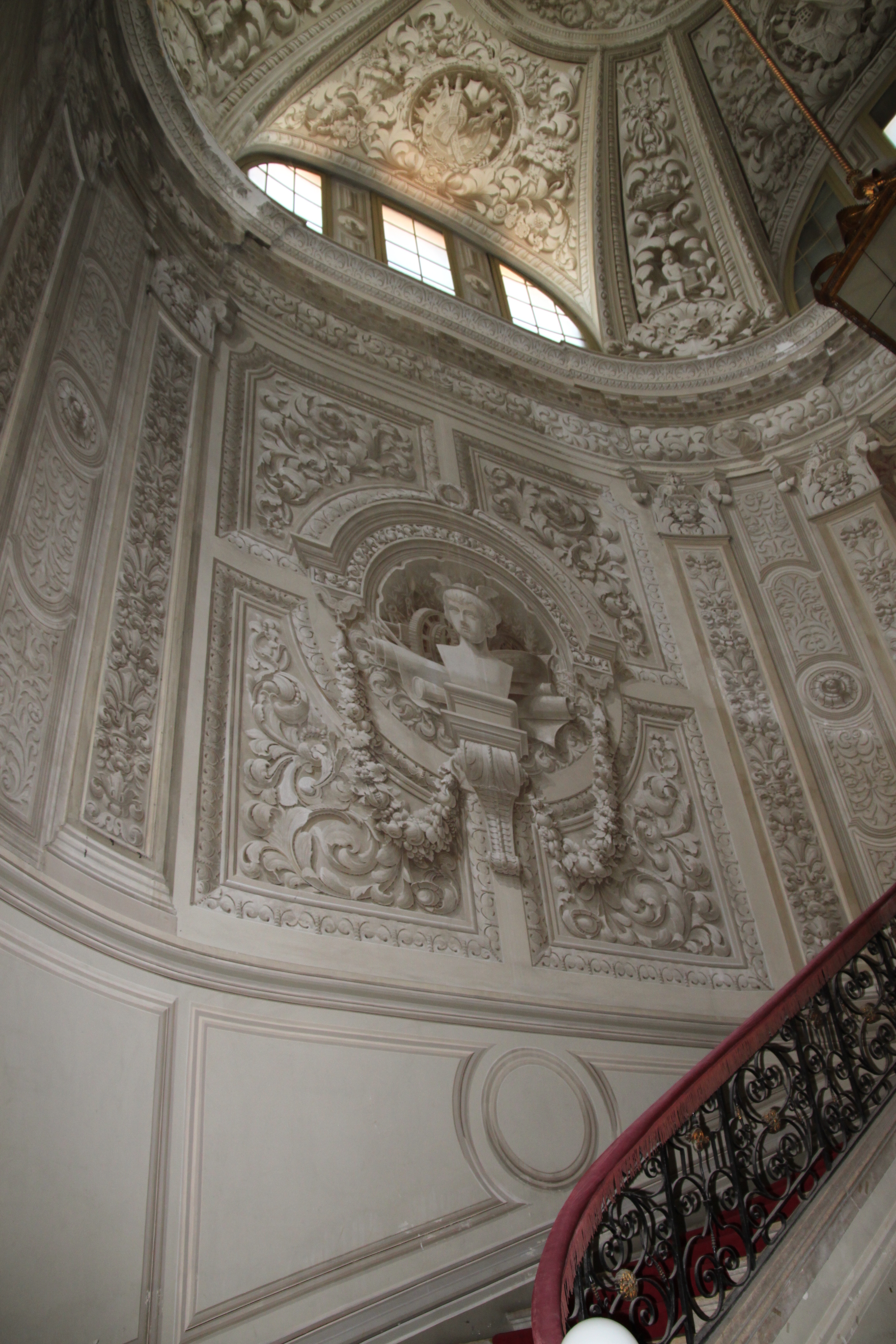

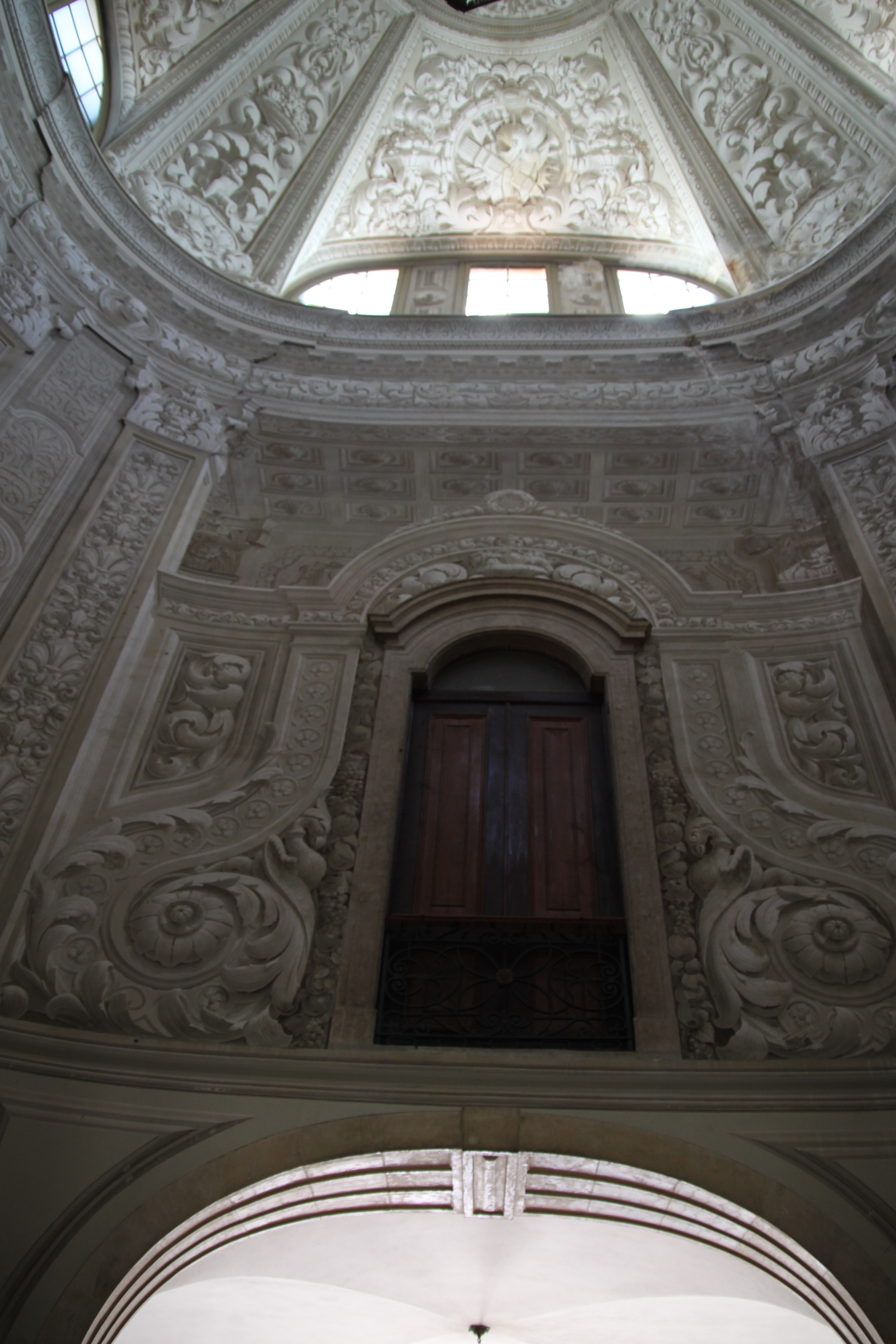

== Sources ==
- Pesquisa de Património: Palácio Burnay, Seus Anexos e Jardim (In Portuguese)
- Palácio Burnay: Texto histórico (In Portuguese)
- História de Portugal: Palácio Burnay (In Portuguese)
