= Leif-Arne Langøy =

Norwegian businessperson (born 1956)

Leif Arne Langøy (born 1956) is a Norwegian businessperson. Since 2003 he has been chief executive officer, and since 2006 also chair, of Aker, and holds several board positions within the group, and is chair of Aker Holding, Aker Seafoods, Aker Drilling, Aker Floating Production, Aker BioMarine and Aker Exploration, and is board member of TRG Holding, Aker Solutions and Aker Philadelphia Shipyard.

Langøy was educated with a siviløkonom degree from the Norwegian School of Economics and Business Administration. He was managing director of Aker Brattvåg for thirteen years, before becoming an executive, and then CEO of Aker Yards.
