= Øyvind Eriksen =

Norwegian attorney and businessman (b. 1964)

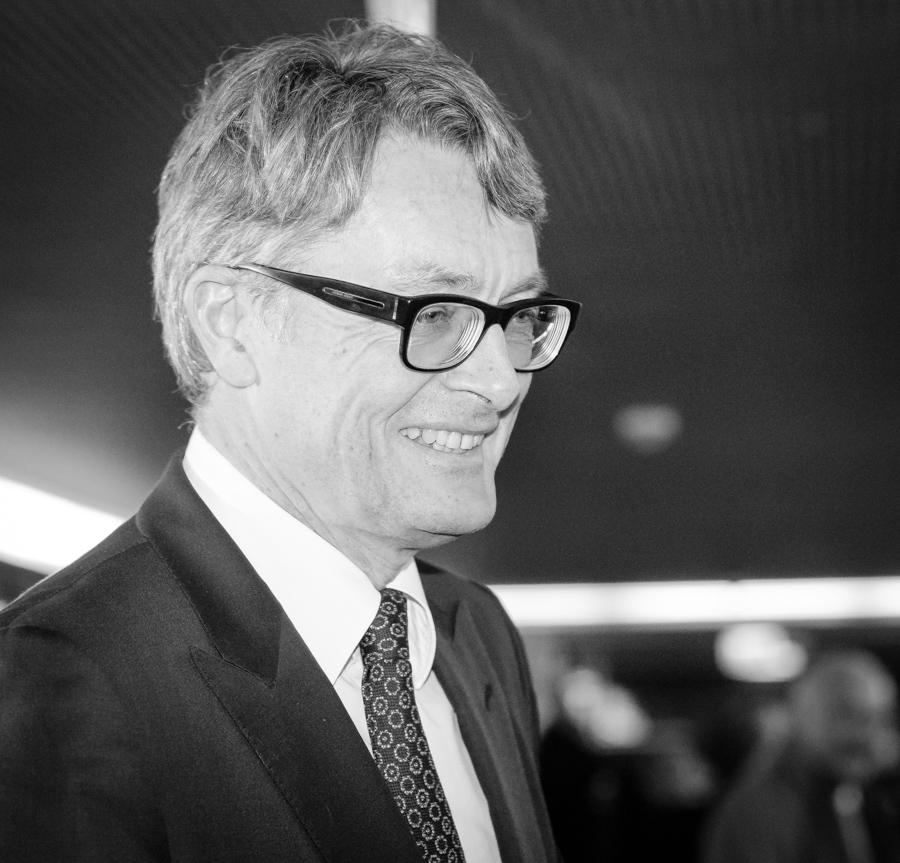
- Born: 1 June 1964 (age 62); Larvik
- Citizenship: Norwegian
- Spouse: Kristin Røed Eriksen
- Children: 2

Øyvind Eriksen (born 1 June 1964 in Larvik, Norway) is a Norwegian attorney and head of industry. On 1 January 2009, he took over from Leif-Arne Langøy as the CEO and president of Aker ASA.

== Education and experience ==
In addition to attending the Royal Norwegian Air Force's officer candidate school, Eriksen holds a law degree from the University of Oslo. He joined the Norwegian law firm BAHR in 1990, where he became a partner in 1996 and a director/chairman in 2003. As a corporate attorney, Eriksen dealt with strategic and operational transactions (M&A) and negotiations, among other things. Eriksen has held a number of directorships in various sectors, including shipping, finance, asset management/investment companies, offshore drilling, fisheries, media, trade and the manufacturing industry. As CEO, Eriksen is currently the chair of the boards of Aker BP ASA, Aker Capital AS, and Aker Holding AS, and deputy chair of Aker Solutions ASA and Aker Property Group AS. In addition, Mr. Eriksen is on the board of a number of non-profit organizations, including the Norwegian Cancer Society, the Accenture Global Energy Board, and the Queen Sonja Art Foundation (QSPA).

== Aker Scholarship ==
Eriksen is also the chair of the board of Aker Scholarship, which finances Master's and PhD students at some of the world's leading universities. The goal is to inspire talented scholarship holders to play a part in developing Norwegian industry and society in the best way for future generations. The Aker Scholarship is awarded by the «Anne Grete Eidsvig and Kjell Inge Røkke's Charitable Foundation for Education».

== The WE Foundation ==
The WE Foundation (Norwegian: Stiftelsen VI) was established in 2018 with Eriksen as the chairman of its board. The WE Foundation works to improve the opportunities and rights of disabled people. Through this foundation, Aker, Aker-owned companies and Kjell Inge Røkke's privately owned company TRG have undertaken to contribute NOK 125 million to Paralympic sports during the 2018-2023 period.
