= Aker Maritime =

Aker Maritime ASA
- Company type: Public
- Industry: Petroleum industry
- Predecessor: Aker Oil & Gas; Maritime Group
- Founded: 1996
- Defunct: 2004
- Fate: Merger
- Successor: Aker Kværner
- Headquarters: Oslo, Norway

Aker Maritime is a defunct Norwegian petroleum industry supply company. Listed on the Oslo Stock Exchange it was controlled by Aker RGI, owned by Kjell Inge Røkke. The company was created in 1996 when Aker's oil and gas division was merged with Maritime Group. In 2001 Kværner was bought by the Aker Group, and Kværner and Aker Maritime were merged to Aker Kværner (now Aker Solutions) in 2004.

== See also ==
- List of oilfield service companies
