= Aker Drilling =

Norwegian drilling rig operation company

- Type: Public
- Industry: Offshore services
- Founded: 2005
- Defunct: 2011
- Fate: Acquired by Transocean
- Successor: Transocean Norway Drilling AS
- Headquarters: Stavanger, Norway
- Key people: Geir Atle Sjøberg (CEO)
- Services: Offshore drilling
- Parent: Transocean
- Website: www.akerdrill.com

Aker Drilling was a Norwegian drilling rig operation company; based in Stavanger, Norway and majority owned by the Aker Group. It was listed on Oslo Stock Exchange under the ticker - 'AKD'.

In October 2011, it was amalgamated into global operations of Transocean and renamed to Transocean Norway Drilling AS, after the completion of the US$1.43 billion acquisition of Aker Drilling by Transocean Ltd.

== History ==
There was previously in the 1970s a different company called Aker Drilling, also part of the Aker Group, which later became part of Fred. Olsen Energy.

The history of the 2005 established Aker drilling is as follows;

=== Inception and expansion (2005–2011) ===
Aker drilling was established in 2005, as part of the Aker Group controlled by the Norwegian billionaire Kjell Inge Røkke. The purpose of the new company was to place contracts for its two new-building semi-submersible drilling rigs. The two Aker H-6e type 6th generation semi-submersibles - Aker Barents and Aker Spitsbergen, were designed by Aker Solutions and being built at Aker Stord AS shipyard.

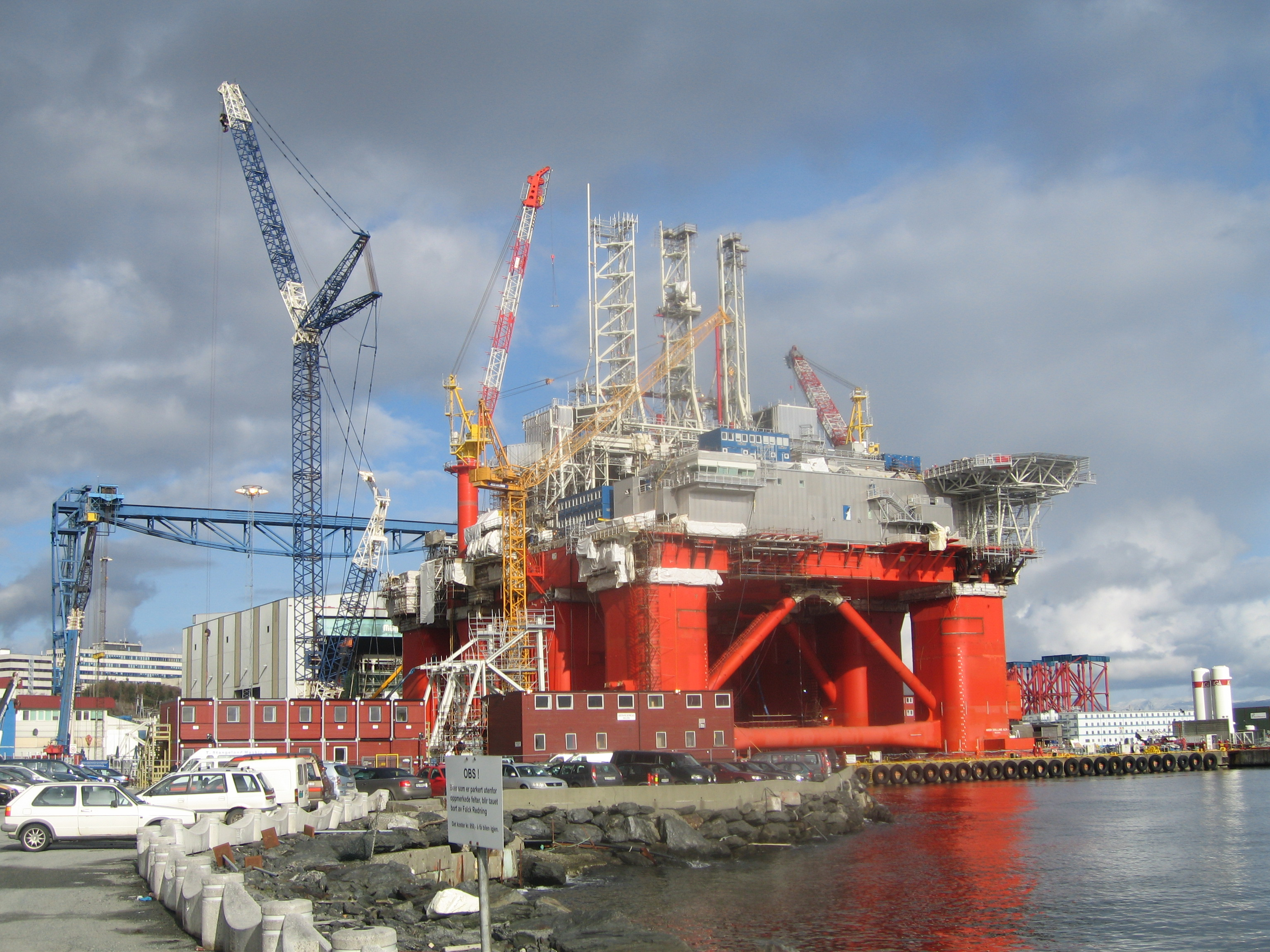
Aker Spitsbergen semi-sumersible at Aker Stord shipyard

In December 2005, Aker drilling went public and was listed on the Oslo Stock Exchange. In 2006, with the Aker Drilling's management team in place, the company set up its head office in Stavanger, Norway. The same year, it secured long-term contracts with Statoil ASA and Aker Exploration ASA (later merged with Det Norske Oljeselskap ASA).

In 2007, it was taken off the exchange to avoid a takeover by billionaire John Fredriksen’s Seadrill, which made a voluntary offer for all outstanding shares in Aker Drilling. Aker ASA, through its wholly owned subsidiary Aker Capital ASA, made a voluntary acquisition of a majority stake in Aker drilling, which subsequently led to the de-listing of the company in March 2008.

In 2009, the company took ownership of the semi submersibles - Aker Barents and Aker Spitsbergen. Aker Barents subsequently commenced drilling operations on the Norwegian continental shelf for Det Norske Oljeselskap ASA (earlier Aker Exploration ASA) in July 2009. And in 2010, Aker Spitsbergen commenced drilling operations for Statoil ASA.

In February 2011, Aker drilling was relisted in the Oslo stock exchange under the ticker - 'AKD', three years after being taken off the exchange.

=== Acquisition by Transocean (2011) ===
On 15 August 2010, Transocean made a US$1.43 billion takeover bid for Aker Drilling. Under the transaction, Transocean made a voluntary NOK26.50 ($4.83) per share cash offer for all outstanding shares in the company. The company was delisted after the take over was completed in October 2011, and it was renamed Transocean Norway Drilling AS - a wholly owned subsidiary of Transocean. Aker Drilling used Goldman Sachs group Inc as its financial adviser, while Transocean was advised by Morgan Stanley and Fearnley Fonds AS.
