= Tinus =

Tinus may refer to:

- Tinus (spider), a spider genus in the family Pisauridae (Nursery web spiders)
- Tinus, Iran, a village in Kerman Province, Iran

Tinus is also a short form of the given name Martinus and Marthinus. It may refer to:

- Tinus Bosselaar (1936–2018), Dutch footballer
- Tinus de Beer (born 1996), South African rugby player
- Tinus van Doorn (1905–1940), Dutch painter and graphic artist
- Tinus du Plessis (born 1984), Namibian rugby player
- Tinus van Gelder (1911–1999), Dutch cyclist
- Tinus de Jongh (1885–1942), Dutch and later South African painter
- Tinus Lambillion (1912–1994), Dutch boxer
- Tinus Linee (1969–2014), South African rugby player
- Tinus Osendarp (1916–2002), Dutch sprinter
- Tinus Pae (born 1989), Indonesian footballer

== See also ==
- Thinus
- Viburnum tinus, a plant species
