= Kjell Almskog =

Norwegian businessman (born 1941)

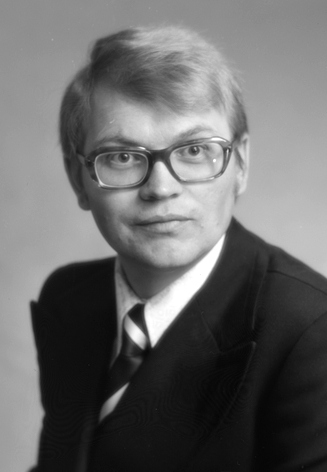
- Almskog in 1974
- Born: 5 January 1941; Oslo

Kjell Erik Almskog (born 5 January 1941) is a Norwegian businessman. He is the former chief executive officer (CEO) of several companies, including the Norwegian division of the ABB Group and Kværner.

== Personal life and education ==
He was born in Oslo as a son of company manager Reidar Juel Almskog (1910–1982) and Aslaug Magnhild Carlsen. He finished his secondary education in 1959, and received his MBA from the University of Kansas in 1964. He attended the six-week Advanced Management Program at Harvard University from 1974 to 1975.

== Career ==
He was the brand manager for Procter & Gamble in London from 1967 to 1971, before becoming the marketing director at Simrad from 1971 to 1976. He became a director in Elektrisk Union in 1976 and then chief executive officer of its daughter companies National Industri in 1979, then National Elektro in 1981. In 1986 he became chief executive officer of Elektrisk Bureau, which soon merged with Elektro Union. In 1988, it also merged with ABB. Almskog remained the chief executive of ABB Norway until 1998, and in the autumn he was promoted to vice chief executive at ABB's main headquarters in Switzerland. During his time at ABB, Almskog built up the company's oil and gas division from scratch.

In 1999, Almskog became chief executive officer of Kværner, after Erik Tønseth. Kværner paid a significant sign-on fee. However, Almskog came into conflict with one of the company's main shareholders, Kjell Inge Røkke, as Røkke wanted to remove Almskog from the board of directors, and Almskog left the company in 2001 when Røkke took over the ownership in Kværner.

Both Almskog's time as Kværner CEO, as well as the circumstances regarding his departure were amidst controversy. Shortly after taking his position at Kværner, Almskog announced that all the company's shipyards would be put up for sale. Former Kværner director Diderik Schnitler blamed Aker Kværner's troubles with the Philadelphia shipyard on this decision. Martin Saarikangas, leader of Kværner Masa Yards, and the shipyard division, labelled Almskog a "wandering catastrophe". When Almskog left Kværner, the company was in economic crisis, but despite this Almskog received a golden parachute worth 78 million kr. Almskog had also received a NOK 600,000 wage increase shortly before leaving.

He has since served on the board of the Orkla Group, and is now the chairman of the board at Intex Resources.
