= Martinus =

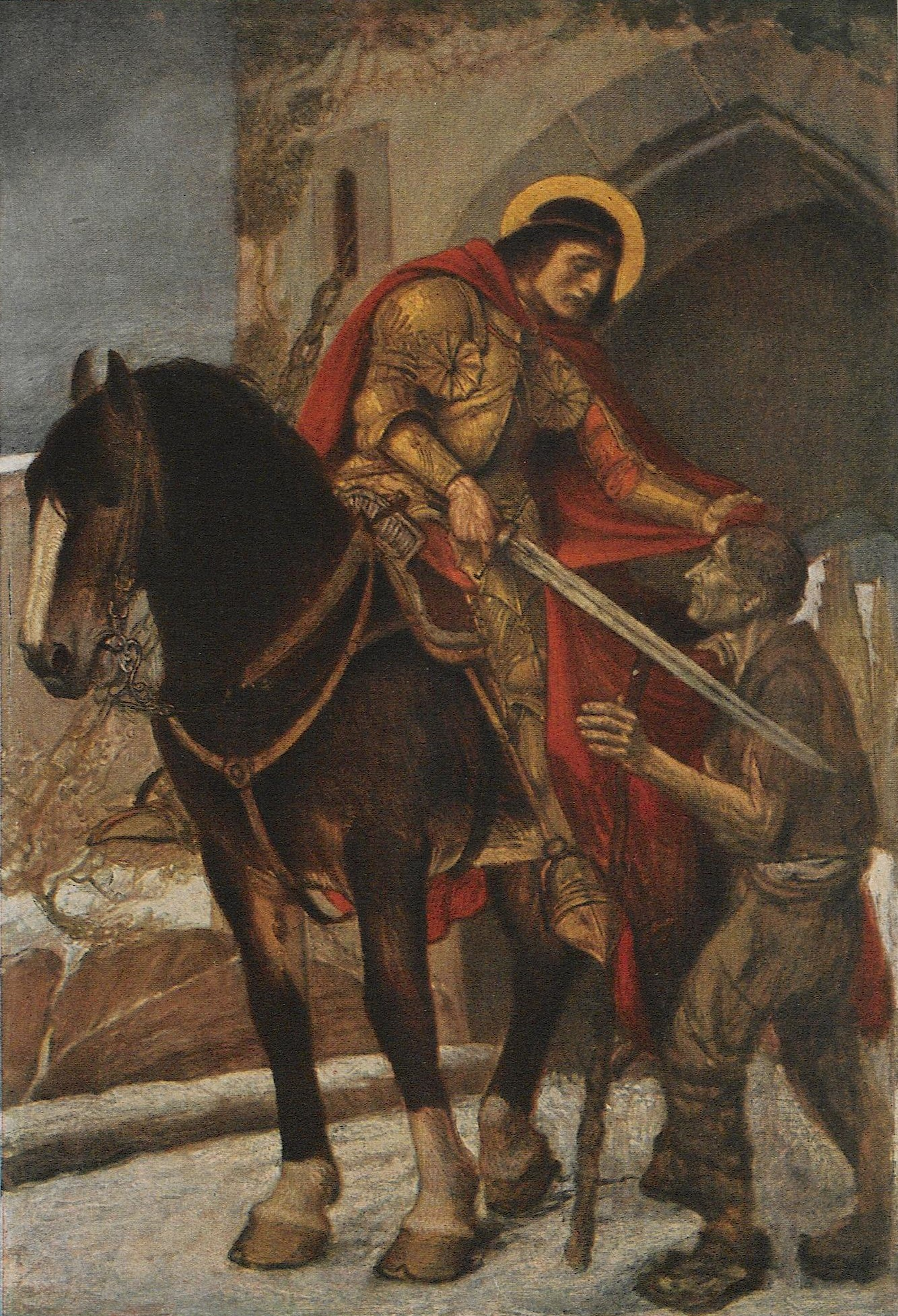
Saint Martin depicted by Fritz Boehle

Martinus is a given name or surname. It comes from the Latin name Martinus, which is a late derived form of the name of the Roman god Mars, protective godhead of the Latins and, therefore, god of war.

== Given name ==
=== People primarily known only by the given name ===
- Martin (magister militum per Armeniam), 6th-century Byzantine/East Roman general
- Martinus (son of Heraclius), 7th-century Byzantine/East Roman co-emperor
- Martinus of Arles, doctor of theology, priest, and author on demonology and witches
- Saint Martinus or Saint Martin of Tours

=== Other ===
- Martinus Beijerinck (1851–1931), Dutch microbiologist
- Martinus von Biberach (died 1498), theologian from Heilbronn, Germany
- Martinus Bosselaar (1936–2018), Dutch football (soccer) player
- Martinus Brandal (born 1960), Norwegian engineer and businessman
- Martinus Dom (1791–1873), first abbot of the Trappist Abbey of Westmalle
- Martinus Fabri, Dutch composer of the late 14th century
- Martinus Gosia, scholar and Italian jurist, one of the Four Doctors of Bologna
- Martinus Gunnarsen, Norwegian pop singer, member of the pop duo Marcus & Martinus
- Martinus Hamconius (c. 1550–1620), Dutch writer and historian
- Martinus Houttuyn (1720–1798), Dutch naturalist
- Martinus Nijhoff (1894–1953), Dutch poet and essayist
- Martinus Mosvidus (c. 1510–1563), author and editor of the first book printed in the Lithuanian language
- Martinus Polonus, Dominican priest and church historian
- Martinus Rørbye (1803–1848), Danish painter
- Martinus Sieveking (1867–1950), Dutch classical composer and pianist
- Martinius Stenshorne (born 2006), Norwegian racing driver
- Martinus Sonck (1590–1625), first Dutch Governor of Formosa
- Martinus Adrianus Stam (1899–1986), Dutch architect, interior designer, and industrial designer
- Martinus Theunis Steyn (1857–1916), lawyer and politician
- Martinus Thomsen (1890–1981), Danish mystic and spiritual teacher
- Martinus J. G. Veltman (1931–2021), Dutch theoretical physicist

== Family name ==
- Derek Martinus (1931–2014), British television and theatre director
- Flavius Martinus, vicarius (governor) of the Roman provinces of Britain

== See also ==
- Marthinus
- Martin (disambiguation)
- Tinus (disambiguation)
- Martinus College, a secondary school in the Netherlands
- VV Martinus, a Dutch volleyball club
