= Thinus =

Thinus is a male given name. It can be a short form of Marthinus, which can also be shortened to Tinus.

Notable people with this name include:

- Thinus Delport (born 1975), South African rugby player
- Thinus Fourie (born 1979), Irish cricket player
