= Nils Astrup Hoel =

Norwegian businessman

Nils Astrup Hoel (3 February 1899 – 30 January 1986) was a Norwegian businessperson.

He was born in Bergen as a son of Ole Andor Hoel (1867–1941) and Ingeborg Astrup (1864–1950). In 1931 he married Astrid Johanna Arnesen.

He finished his secondary education in 1916, took the basic officer's course at the Norwegian Military Academy in 1917 before graduating from the Royal Frederick University with a cand.oecon. degree in 1920. He also attended Bergen Handelsgymnasium for one year, worked in Centralbanken for Norge and Freia Chocolade Fabrik between 1921 and 1924 before taking the cand.jur. degree in 1926. From 1927 to 1928 he worked as a secretary in the Ministry of Finance.

He was hired in Hafslund as a board secretary in 1928, was promoted to manager in 1933 (also manager of Glommens Træsliberi and Vamma Fossekompagnie) and chief executive officer from 1936 to 1965. During Astrup Hoel's time in Hafslund, the employment rose from about 500 to 750, the delivery of kilowatt hour had risen from about 800 000 000 to 3 000 000 000, and the income was seven times higher. Hoel was succeeded by former vice chief executive Fredrik Stang Heffermehl.

Hoel was also a board member in the company from 1947 to 1970, and deputy chair of Glommens og Laagens Brukseierforening from 1946 to 1966. He was the deputy chair of Landsforeningen for Elektrokjemisk og Elektrometallurgisk industri from 1956 to 1962, a supervisory council member of Forsikringsaktieselskabet Norden, Christiania Bank og Kreditkasse, Norsk Sprængstofindustri, Nasjonal Pappemballasje-Industri and Noratom, and a deputy council member of Norges Eksportråd from 1953 to 1965.

He was decorated as a Knight, First Class of the Order of St. Olav in 1955. He died in January 1986.

Business positions
Preceded by	Chief executive officer of Hafslund; 1936–1965	Succeeded by Fredrik Stang Heffermehl
