= Akerselvens Maskinverksted =

Former Norwegian mechanical workshop

- Formerly: Nyland Nord; Nylands Maskinverksted
- Type: Aksjeselskap
- Industry: Mechanical engineering
- Founded: 1891
- Defunct: 1989
- Fate: Bankruptcy; operations moved to Arendal
- Headquarters: Oslo, Norway
- Key people: Emil Bakke, Harald Bakke, Knut Bakke
- Products: Tanks, pasteurization plants, special machinery, process equipment

Akerselvens Maskinverksted (Norwegian for "The Aker River Machine Workshop") was a mechanical, plate, assembly, and machine workshop in Oslo, established in 1891. The workshop lay on the west bank of the Akerselva, just below the Sannerbrua bridge, in a building that was later demolished. The company moved to Kalbakken and became part of Aker in 1971, and the workshop was closed in 1989.

== History ==
The machine workshop was started in 1891 by Emil Bakke (1850–1909), who had led Christiania Maskinverksted after it was taken over by Christian Mohn in 1885. In an 1893 advertisement the workshop commended "its mechanical workshop and foundries" and guaranteed "solid, handsome, and modern work," and in another advertisement it named band saws, molding planes, and other joinery equipment as its specialty, along with iron building parts to order.

Bakke's brother, the engineer Harald Bakke (1868–1953), joined the firm in 1894. He had trained at the Christiania Technical School, among other places, and had received a state scholarship for practical work in Germany, Belgium, and England. When Emil died in 1909, Harald Bakke became manager and owner. The factory and workforce were gradually expanded, and it became one of the larger mechanical companies in Oslo toward 1940, with between 50 and 100 salaried staff and workers depending on the order situation. Its deliveries were largely directed at the food industry, where steel and aluminum tanks, pasteurization plants, and equipment for the margarine industry in particular became specialties of the workshop. The iron and metal club at the company stood out as one of the active trade unions of the time, while the owner was engaged in the employers' organization, the Mechanical Workshops' National Federation.

== Generational change ==
The sons Even Andreas (1913–1978) and Knut Emil (1917–1992) entered the family business after completing their education, as a civil engineer in 1937 and an economist in 1943 respectively. After Harald's death in 1953, Even withdrew from the business and went to Gjøvik, where he later started his own firm specializing in cableways, among other things, which was developed into an offshore-technology company under the name EAB Engineering. His brother Knut took over Akerselvens Maskinverksted and developed it further, including in special machines for bakeries and dairies, metalwork for building and construction, process equipment such as conveyor systems and concrete mixers, and the rebuilding of construction machinery.

In 1957 a new and more modern plate workshop was built at Østre Aker vei 162 (later renumbered 206) at Nedre Kalbakken in Groruddalen. Everything was gathered there in 1970, and the factory by the Akerselva was sold, leased to various businesses before being demolished in 2007 and replaced with housing.

== Part of Aker Nyland ==
The following year the workshop became part of the Aker group. In February 1971 it was reported that all the shares had been taken over by Aker, and from then on Akerselvens Maskinverksted was referred to in advertisements as a department of Nylands Verksted, and later simply as Nyland Nord. This maneuver was decisive in the restructuring of Aker and its shift from shipbuilding to increasingly offshore-related construction. It would also prove to be the nail in the coffin for the tradition-rich yard in Bjørvika, the original Nyland: with the capacity in Østre Aker vei, plate work and engine service could be moved from the harbor to Groruddalen, and the rest that needed harbor access was moved to what was then called Nyland Vest, best known as the old Akers Mek. in Pipervika, before that too was closed in 1982.

The restructuring at Aker continued, and Nyland Nord was sold in 1983 to reappear under new owners as Nylands Maskinverksted A/S. The new company had investors from the shipping industry, among others, which made up the bulk of its customer base, and many of the employees also bought shares. The change brought a reduction in staffing from around 150 to 100 and a sharper focus on supplying spare parts to the merchant fleet globally. Operations continued for four more years before bankruptcy in 1987. The Skeie group bought the estate and guaranteed continued operation of 50 jobs, but in 1988 it was reported that these would be moved to Pusnes in Arendal Municipality. The last workers lost their jobs in January 1989, and with that the last workers from the pure shipbuilding industry in Oslo also disappeared. The plant at Kalbakken was sold to a steel wholesaler and has since served as a warehouse.
