= Heffermehl =

Heffermehl is a Norwegian surname. Notable people with the surname include:

- Fredrik Heffermehl (born 1938), Norwegian peace activist
- Fredrik Stang Heffermehl (1913–1993), Norwegian jurist and businessman
