= Eriksrud =

Eriksrud is a surname. Notable people with the surname include:

- Emil Eriksrud (1926–1990), Norwegian businessperson and judge
- Simen Eriksrud (born 1975), Norwegian DJ, songwriter and record producer
- Simone Eriksrud (born 1970), Norwegian musician, singer and composer
