= Shortline railroad =

Type of railroad

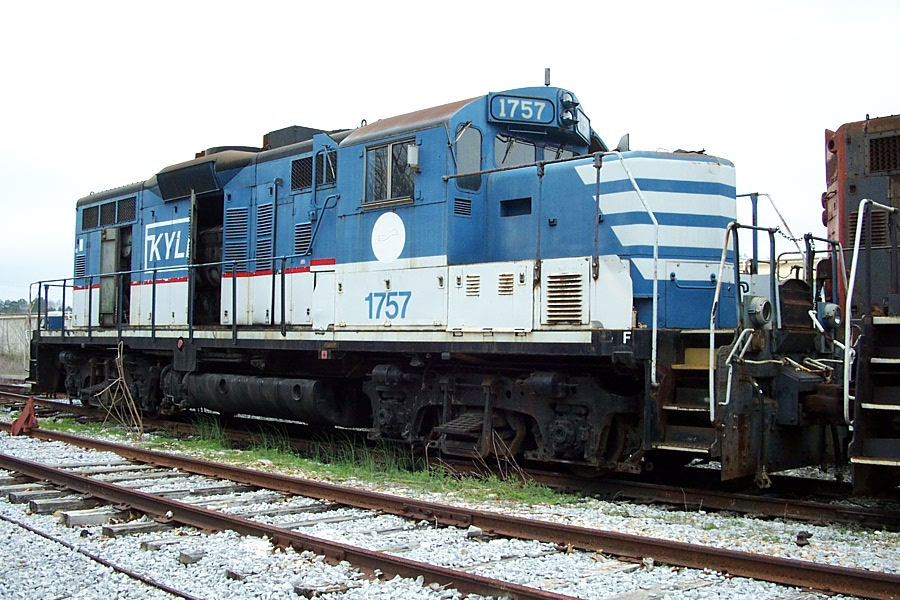
A locomotive of the Kyle Railroad, a shortline railroad that runs from north-central Kansas into eastern Colorado

A shortline railroad is a small or mid-sized railroad company that operates over a relatively short distance relative to larger, national railroad networks. The term is used primarily in the United States and Canada. In the former, railroads are categorized by operating revenue, and most shortline railroads fall into the Class III or Class II categorization defined by the Surface Transportation Board.

== History ==
At the beginning of the railroad age, nearly all railway lines were shortlines, locally chartered, financed and operated; as the railroad industry matured, local lines were merged or acquired to create longer mainline railroads.

Especially since 1980 in the U.S. and 1990 in Canada, many shortlines have been established when larger railroad companies sold off or abandoned low-profit portions of their trackage. Shortline operators typically have lower labor, overhead and regulatory costs than Class I railroads and therefore are often able to operate profitable lines that lost money for their original owners. Most shortlines use non-union labor. Because shortlines are often dependent on a few businesses to provide traffic, the closure or disruption of those businesses can have severe financial impacts.

Shortlines generally exist for one or more of the following reasons:

- to link two industries requiring rail freight together (for example, a gypsum mine and a wall board factory, or a coal mine and a power plant)
- to interchange revenue traffic with other, usually larger, railroads
- to operate a tourist passenger train service.

In France, opérateurs ferroviaires de proximité (local railways operators) are equivalent to shortline railroads.

== Classification ==
Because of their small size and generally low revenues, the great majority of shortline railroads in the U.S. are classified by the Association of American Railroads (AAR) as Class III. As defined by the Surface Transportation Board (STB), a Class III is a railroad with an annual operating revenue of less than $28 million. In Canada, Transport Canada classifies shortline railroads as Class II.

There are three kinds of shortlines in the U.S.: handling, switch, and ISS (Interline Settlement System).

- Handling shortlines exist only to move cars along their tracks for larger railroads. They are not listed in the route on a railcar's waybill. Handling shortlines may have compensation agreements with the larger railroads they serve that do not depend on per car rates.
- Switch shortlines are similar to handling shortlines except that they are listed on a railcar's route, and they collect a fee for each car they move on their tracks.
- ISS shortlines operate the same as Class I and II railroads. They are included in the routes of railcars. Also, they serve as the billing railroads for loads that originate on their lines. For loads not originating on their lines, ISS shortlines still collect a portion of the freight rate.

It was reported in 2009 that shortline railroads employ 20,000 people in the U.S., and own 30 percent of the nation's railroad tracks. About a quarter of all U.S. rail freight travels at least a small part of its journey over a short-line railroad.

An ever-growing number of shortline operators have been acquired by larger holding companies which own or lease railroad properties in many states, as well as internationally. For example, Genesee & Wyoming controls over 100 railroads in over 40 U.S. states and four Canadian provinces. A consequence of such consolidation is that shortline railroads may no longer be "by state".

== See also ==
- List of U.S. railroads
- List of Canadian railroads
- List of Mexican railroads
- Bayside Canadian Railway – a very short shortline railway which was used to circumvent the Jones Act
- Switching and terminal railroad
- Third-sector railway – classification of many shortline Japanese passenger railways
