= Martinus Brandal =

Norwegian engineer and businessperson (born 1960)

- Born: 1960 (age 65–66)
- Education: Oslo University College
- Occupation: businessperson

Martinus Brandal (March 11, 1960) is a Norwegian engineer and businessman. He is chair of Aker Floating Production and Aker Solutions.

Brandal was educated with a bachelor in electrical engineering from Oslo University College. He worked for the ABB Group from 1985 to 2004, including management positions in the Zürich headquarters. During this period he also sat on the boards of Aker Kværner and Aker Seafoods. In 2004 Brandal started working for Aker, and in 2006 he was appointed chief executive officer of Aker Kværner (later renamed Aker Solutions), a position he held until 2008, when he became president of energy technologies of the Aker Group. He later became CEO of Solør Bioenergi.
