= MS American Monarch =

Factory stern fishing trawler

History

United States
- Name: American Monarch
- Owner: Resource Group International
- Operator: American Seafoods
- Builder: Aker Langsten, Vestnes, Norway
- In service: 1996
- Home port: Seattle
- Identification: IMO number: 9139610; MMSI number: 312418000; Callsign: V3RB9
- Status: In service

General characteristics
- Class & type: Stern trawler
- Tonnage: 6701 GRT
- Length: 315 ft 8 in (96.2 m)
- Beam: 60 ft 8 in (18.5 m); 18.5 m (60.7 ft)
- Propulsion: 6580 kw

MS American Monarch is a factory stern fishing trawler. At over 6,000 GRT, the ship can process 1,200 tons of fish a day. British historian David Edgerton has noted that: "since the total global catch is 100 million tons per annum ... 300 of these ships could catch all the fish now caught worldwide".
