= Cxense =

Norwegian technology company

Cxense ASA (pronounced ['si:sɛns]) was a technology company, founded by John Markus Lervik in Oslo, Norway in 2010. In 2019 it was acquired by Piano Software Inc. and removed from the Oslo Stock Exchange.

The product Cxense made was a tool that was supposed to automatically create an interest profile for users browsing web sites, and use that profile to serve personalized ads and content in order to spy and sell information about your sensitive activity.
