= Fredrik Stang Heffermehl =

Norwegian jurist and businessperson

Fredrik Stang Heffermehl (22 March 1913 – 27 February 1993) was a Norwegian jurist and businessperson.

He was born in Kristiania as a son of consul Fredrik Stang Heffermehl Sr. (1870–1937) and Ida Henriksen (1876–1955). He finished his secondary education in 1930, and graduated from the Royal Frederick University with the cand.jur. degree in 1935. He started working as a jurist, and also studied abroad on a scholarship in 1939. He was married twice; first from 1937 to Elisabeth Thorne Nielsen (1914–1943). After she died, Heffermehl married Karin Louise Moestue in 1914.

He was hired in the Hafslund corporation in 1937 as a judicial secretary. This meant that he worked for both Hafslund, Glommens Træsliberi and Vamma Fossekompani. In 1946 he was promoted to assisting director in the Hafslund corporation. He was promoted further to mercantile director in 1953, vice chief executive in 1961 and chief executive in 1966. He remained chief executive until 1979, and was then a board member until 1983.

He was a central board member of the Norwegian Employers' Confederation, and a member of the board, the executive committee and several other committees in the Federation of Norwegian Industries during the 1950s and 1960s. He was a deputy chairman of Glommens og Laagens Brukseierforening, board member of Viul Tresliperi and supervisory council member of Noratom and Norcontrol.

Heffermehl was decorated as a Knight, First Class of the Order of St. Olav in 1979. He died in February 1993.

Business positions
Preceded by Nils Astrup Hoel	Chief executive officer of Hafslund; 1966–1979	Succeeded by Emil Eriksrud
