= REV Ocean =

Research and expedition vessel

History

Norway
- Name: REV Ocean
- Owner: Kjell Inge Røkke
- Port of registry: Norway
- Ordered: May 2017
- Builder: Fincantieri
- Cost: US$350-500 million
- Laid down: 2017
- Launched: 2019-08-24
- Completed: 2026 (planned)
- Status: Fitting out

General characteristics
- Type: Research vessel
- Tonnage: 19,235 GT
- Length: 194.9 m (639 ft)
- Beam: 22 m (72 ft)
- Draft: 5.25 m (17.2 ft)
- Ice class: Polar Class 6
- Installed power: 4 × Wärtsilä 8L26 (4 × 2.7 MW (3,600 hp))
- Speed: 11 knots (20 km/h; 13 mph), with 17 knots (31 km/h; 20 mph) maximum
- Range: 21,120 nmi (39,110 km; 24,300 mi)
- Boats & landing craft carried: 2 trawlers, 1 submersible.
- Complement: 90 (crew, scientists and guests)
- Crew: 30
- Aviation facilities: 2 helipads, ACH145 Airbus Corporate helicopter.

REV Ocean is a privately funded research and expedition vessel (REV) under construction by VARD shipyards.

Some sources describe her as a yacht, but unlike a yacht, her main purpose is not recreation or sports. She is 194.9 metres (639 ft) in length and her gross tonnage is 19,235.

== Design and construction ==
REV Ocean was designed by Espen Øino with an interior by H2 Yacht Design. It was initially intended to be a 140 m superyacht with some research facilities, but during the design process she grew in size and was turned into a research and expedition vessel with a yacht-like exterior and high standards of comfort and design, including a luxury accommodation.

Contracts for construction and outfitting were signed in 2017, with an expected delivery in 2021. On June 17, 2021 it was announced that delivery was moved back to 2024. In 2025 a contract was signed with Damen Shiprepair and to outfit the vessel. Currect delivery of the vessel is expected to be late 2026.

The hull was built and equipped with the diesel-electric propulsion system in Tulcea, Romania, and initially launched on 24 August 2019. She was then towed to Brattvåg, Norway to be fitted out with more technology. However, the ship was moved to Fosen Yard near Trondheim and fitted with a 12 metre midsection for a final length of 195 m.

Final interior and exterior outfit is planned to happen at Vlissingen-Oost, Vlissingen, The Netherlands.

== Owner and operation ==
REV Ocean is the flagship of Norwegian billionaire businessman Kjell Inge Røkke's REV Ocean initiative. In an interview with the Norwegian newspaper Aftenposten (published 1 May 2017) Røkke said he planned to give away most of his fortune. As a further step in this plan he joined the Giving Pledge in 2017, and founded the REV Ocean initiative.

Led by former WWF Norway CEO Nina Jensen, REV Ocean is working to improve understanding of the ocean and foster concrete solutions through three initiatives: the world's largest research and expedition vessel (REV), the World Ocean Headquarters and an open, global data platform.

She is purpose-built for scientific charter and environmental research missions.

Her TIER III hybrid propulsion allows a full-electric mode at eleven knots when the yacht collects samples. Her total operating range is 21,000 nautical miles.
