= Eva Bull Holte =

Norwegian painter

- Born: Eva Vibeke Bull; 15 January 1922; Kristiania, Norway
- Died: 15 February 1993 (aged 71); Oslo
- Resting place: Åmotsdal Church, Åmotsdal, Norway
- Occupation(s): Painter and printmaker
- Spouse: Johan Berthin Holte

Eva Bull Holte (née Eva Vibeke Bull; 15 January 1922 – 15 February 1993) was a Norwegian painter and printmaker.

== Personal life ==
Holte was born in Kristiania, Norway, on 15 January 1922 to Hildur Jenny Marie Knudsen and Carl Albert Bull.

In 1944, Eva married industrialist and businessman Johan Berthin Holte.

== Career ==
Holte was a recognised artist in her time. She was primarily known as a painter, but she also produced drawings, prints, graphics and ceramics.

Holte studied at the Norwegian National Academy of Craft and Art Industry from 1940 to 1944 where she trained as a ceramist.

She did further study at the Norwegian National Academy of Fine Arts under Jean Heiberg from 1947 to 1950. She studied at the École des Beaux-Arts from 1951 to 1953.

She had her debut exhibition in 1957 at Galleri Per in Oslo, with motives from mountain landscapes in France and Telemark, and later also painted landscapes from Jutland and Mallorca, as well as portraits. She is represented in the Norwegian National Museum of Art, Architecture and Design with four paintings, Lier I (1963), Tange (Danmark) (1968), Swaldale in Yorkshire (1974) and Mot aften, Harang.

== Death and legacy ==
Holte died in Oslo on 15 February 1993. She is buried with her husband Johan at the Åmotsdal Church cemetery, Åmotsdal, Norway.

During the 1950s, Holte and her husband had bought farm Sneie in Åmotsdal which included several historic buildings. It was on this site that an art museum was built in her honour - the Eva Bull Holte Museum.

On Saturday 12 June 1999, the art museum was officially opened by the County Governor of Telemark. The museum is open every summer and exhibits Holtes works as well as a guest artist each year.

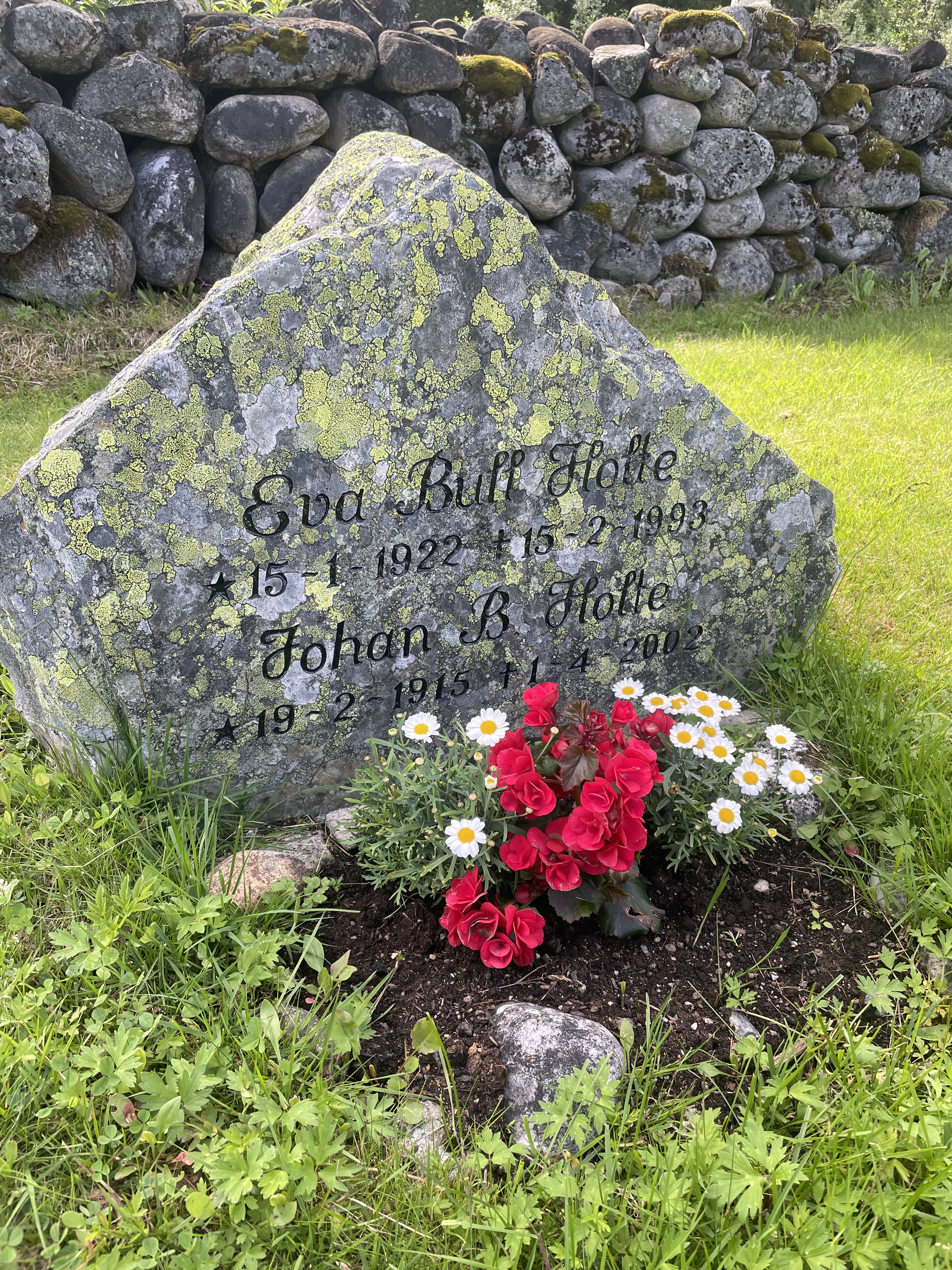

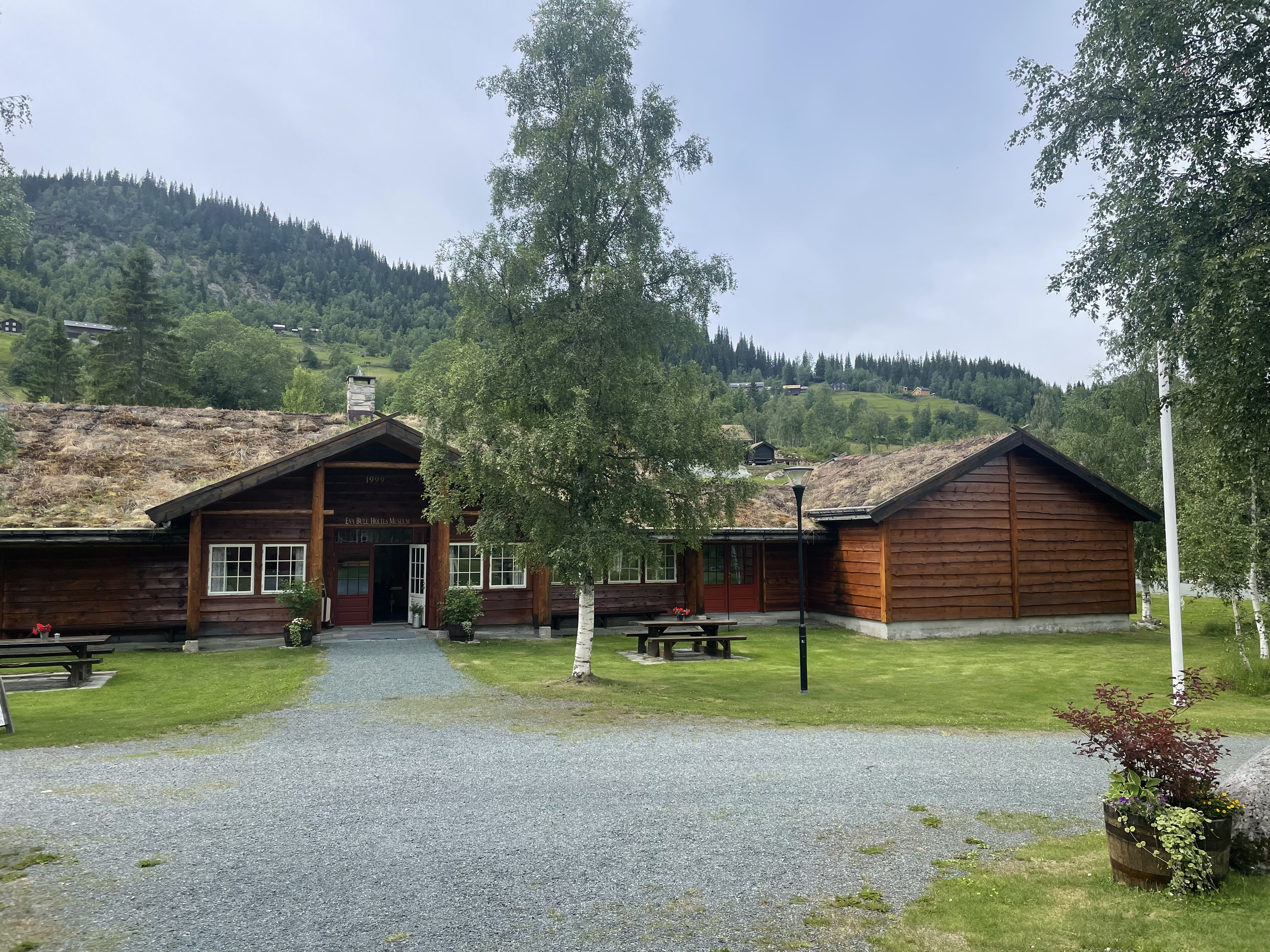

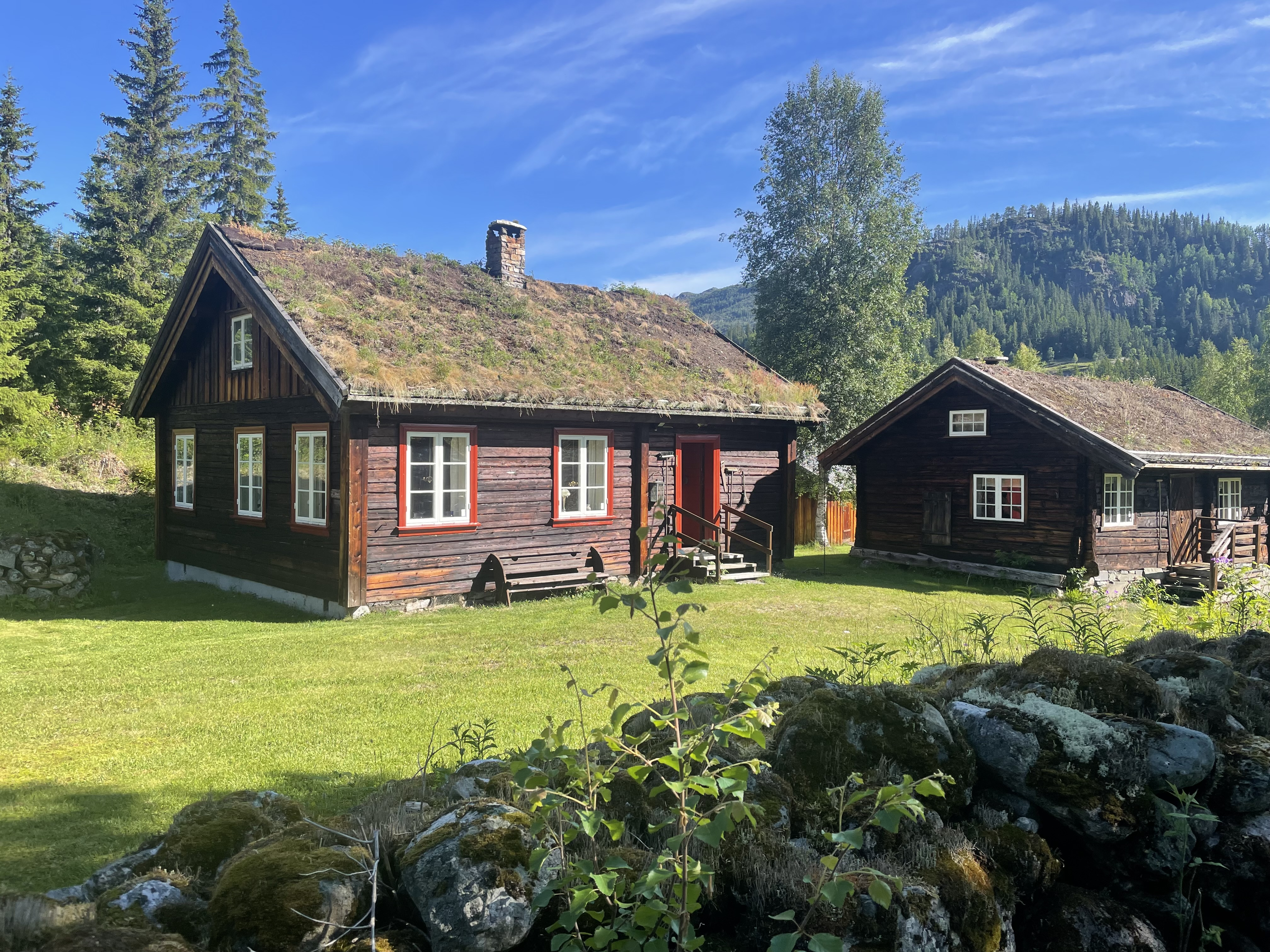

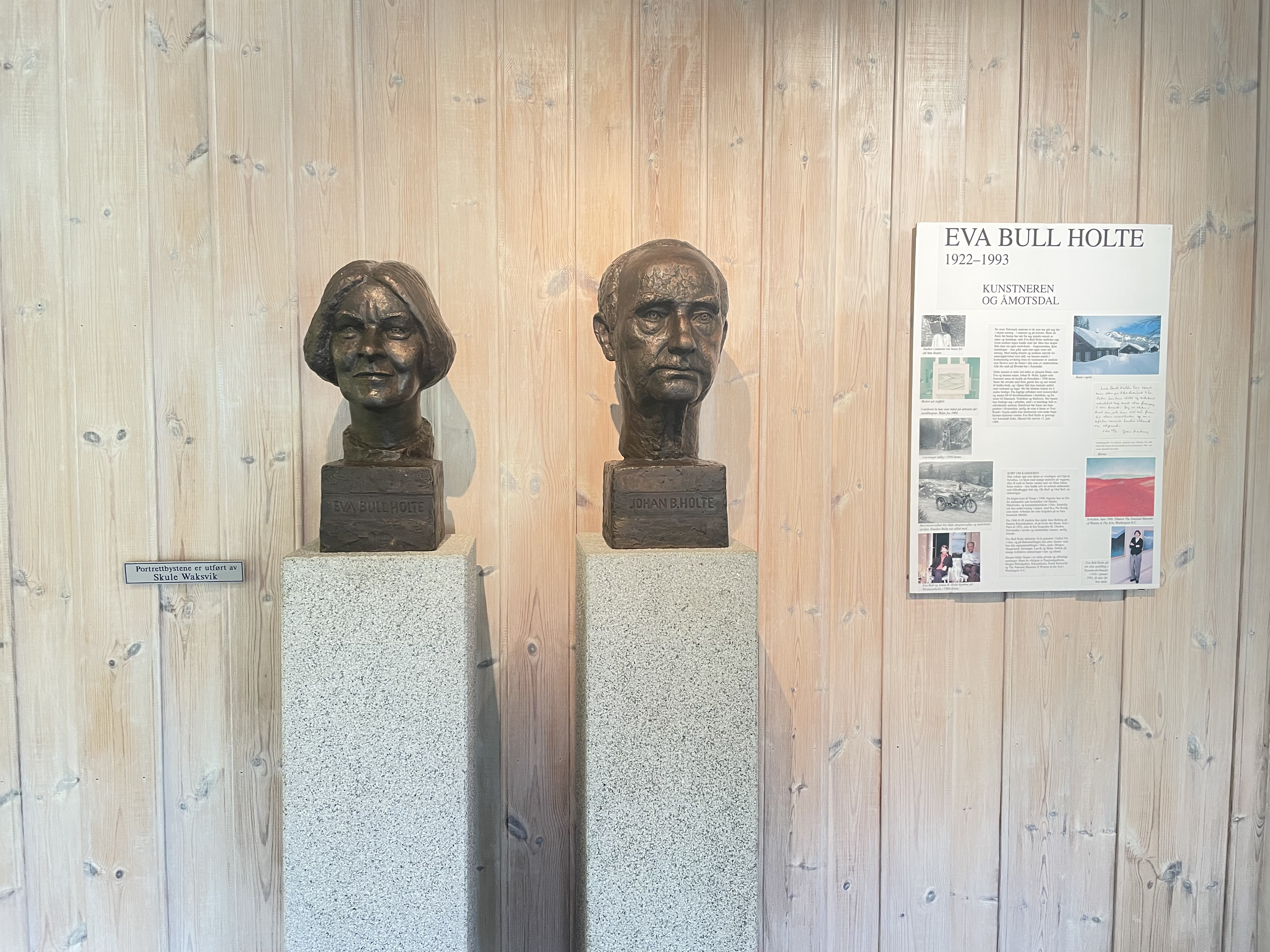
