= Johan Berthin Holte =

Norwegian businessman (1915–2002)

Johan Berthin Holte (19 February 1915 – 1 April 2002) was a Norwegian businessperson.

== Biography ==
He was born in Notodden as a son of chief administrative officer Peder Olaus Holte (1875–1943) and Lorentze Indorff (1890–19). In 1944 he married artist Eva Vibeke Bull (1922–1991).

He graduated with a degree in chemistry from the Norwegian Institute of Technology in 1938. He was hired by Norsk Hydro in 1948 as head of their Notodden department. He advanced to become director of research from 1957 to 1964 and assisting director-general from 1964 to 1966. In 1967 he was hired as director-general (CEO). He stayed in this position until 1977; after this he was chairman of the board from 1977 to 1985.

He also chaired Kværner, Standard Telefon og Kabelfabrik and Sør-Norge Aluminium, was a board member of the Norwegian Employers' Confederation, Alnor, IBM in Norway, Dyno Industrier and Vannlinjen, and a supervisory council member of Borregaard, Elektrokemisk, AS Vestheim and Skips-AS Nordheim. He was a fellow of the Norwegian Academy of Science and Letters, the Norwegian Academy of Technological Sciences and the Royal Swedish Academy of Engineering Sciences. He was decorated as a Commander of the Order of St. Olav (1976) and the Legion of Honour.

Business positions
Preceded by Rolf Østbye	Director-general of Norsk Hydro; 1967–1977	Succeeded by Odd Narud
Preceded by Preben Munthe	Chair of Norsk Hydro; 1977–1985	Succeeded by Egil Abrahamsen
Preceded by Frithjof A. Lind	Chair of Kværner; 1982–1985	Succeeded by Emil Eriksrud
