= John Markus Lervik =

Norwegian businessman

John Markus Lervik (born 17 August 1969) is a Norwegian tech entrepreneur. He is the founder and former CEO of Cognite AS. He previously was the CEO of Fast Search & Transfer, which was acquired by Microsoft in 2008. In 2010 Lervik founded Cxense, a company in the ad-platform, search and online analytics space, which was acquired by Piano Media in 2019.

Lervik has a PhD from the Norwegian University of Science and Technology, Trondheim, where he was awarded an Esso academic award for his PhD work in 1996.

Lervik was the first to be hired to work at Fast Search & Transfer.

In 2005 Lervik was mentioned as one of the key innovators in the Forbes E-gang: Masters of Information.

In 2014 Lervik was, in his capacity as CEO of FAST, found guilty of accounting irregularities and market manipulation. Lervik pleaded innocent to all charges. In March 2016, the Supreme Court of Norway upheld the rulings of both the District court (Norway) and Court of appeal (Norway) that Lervik had made no personal gains in connection the charges brought against him.

Lervik is a fellow of the Norwegian Academy of Technological Sciences.
