= Cognite =

Norwegian software as a service company

Cognite AS
- Industry: Software
- Founded: 2016; 10 years ago
- Headquarters: Phoenix, Arizona, United States
- Key people: Girish Rishi (CEO); John Markus Lervik (Co-founder)
- Number of employees: 367 (2026)
- Website: cognite.com

Cognite AS is a Norwegian software as a service company with headquarters in Oslo, Norway and offices in Tokyo, Houston and Austin. The company provides software and industrial internet of things (IIoT) services to industrial companies.

== Overview ==
Founded in 2016, Cognite AS offers a data operations and contextualization platform that puts raw data into real-world industrial context. The company's main software product is Cognite Data Fusion (CDF). CDF is a cloud-based industrial DataOps platform that supports the digital transformation of heavy-asset industries such as oil and gas, power and utilities, renewable energy and manufacturing. Cognite's Notable customers have included Aker BP, BP, Saudi Aramco, Alfa Laval, Statnett, Mitsubishi Heavy Industries, and TechnipFMC.

In 2021, Cognite raised $150 million in a Series B investment by TCV. According to the 2021 report of Nasdaq, Cognite was valued at $1.6 billion.

In February 2022, it was announced that Aramco Overseas, a subsidiary of Saudi Aramco, had acquired a 7.4% stake in Cognite by purchasing 100% of Aker BP’s shares in the company. Aker BP was Cognite's largest customer.

In April 2022, Girish Rishi, former CEO of Blue Yonder, succeeded John Markus Lervik as CEO. Lervik shifted to the position of chief development and strategy officer.

In August 2024, Cognite partnered with Radix to use AI to develop a more advanced data management system.

On June 30th 2026, Schneider Electric announced an agreement to acquire Cognite for $3.1 billion.
