= Carl Røtjer =

Norwegian businessperson (1924–2006)

Carl Røtjer (1924 – 2006) was a Norwegian businessperson.

During the occupation of Norway by Nazi Germany, Røtjer participated in the resistance as a member of Milorg's Group 131134. After the war, he studied at the Norwegian Institute of Technology, graduating in machine engineering in 1949. He was hired at his father's workplace Kværner Brug in 1950, and in 1958 he was promoted to succeed his father as head of the sheet metal department.

In 1963, he became technical director in the company acquired by Kværner, Moss Værft & Dokk, being promoted to chief executive in 1968. In 1973, he joined the corporate management of Kværner. From 1976 to 1986 he was the corporation's director-general, finishing off with three years as chairman of the board until 1989.

Røtjer was a fellow of the Norwegian Academy of Technological Sciences, and was a member of the gentleman's club Det Norske Selskab. He died in December 2006. His son Tom Røtjer became a part of the corporate management of Norsk Hydro.

Business positions
| Preceded by Kjell B. Langballe | Director-general of Kværner; 1976–1986 | Succeeded by Mikal H. Grønner |
| Preceded by Emil Eriksrud | Chair of Kværner; 1986–1989 | Succeeded by Kaspar Kielland |
