= Bayside Canadian Railway =

Former Canadian short line railway

Coordinates: 45°09′31″N 67°08′23″W

Overview
- Status: Dismantled
- Owner: American Seafood Group

Service
- Rolling stock: 1 × FTD Trackmobile railcar mover; 2 × flatcars

History
- Opened: 2012
- Closed: Likely around November 2022

Technical
- Track length: 200 ft (61 m)
- Track gauge: 4 ft 8 1/2 in (1,435 mm) standard gauge
Route map
The former Bayside Canadian Railway highlighted in violet

The Bayside Canadian Railway was an extremely short railway in Bayside, New Brunswick, Canada. Its apparent sole purpose was to perform as a Canadian railway, to take advantage of an exemption in the Jones Act that would normally forbid the use of foreign-flagged vessels in shipping between two U.S. ports.

The railway consisted of a single section of standard gauge track of about 200 ft (61 m) long with a buffer stop at one end and a loading ramp at the other. The railway had just two flatbed rail cars as its rolling stock with the sole motive power on the railway being one FTD Trackmobile railcar mover. It took just 45 seconds for a train to complete a full round trip.

Planet Labs satellite data from November 2022 has led to the suggestion that the railway was demolished.

== Usage ==
American Seafoods Group' shipping companies Kloosterboer International and Alaska Reefer Management ship frozen pollock from Dutch Harbor (Alaska), through the Panama Canal to the eastern United States.

The Jones Act mandates the use of U.S.-flagged vessels when shipping between two U.S. ports, but there is an exemption if part of the route is over Canadian rail lines.

American Seafoods has been using foreign-flagged shipping "for years" and, until 2012, they used a 30-mile-long (48 km) route of shipping by the New Brunswick Southern Railway. However, in 2012, this practice changed such that upon arrival in Bayside, the fish was transferred to trucks which were driven one at a time up a loading ramp onto two flatbed railcars. A railcar mover would then pull the cars to the other end of the railroad track, reverse and push the "train" back to the loading ramp whereupon the truck would drive off the ramp and then enter the US via Calais, Maine.

== Court case ==
On August 16, 2021, the U.S. Customs and Border Protection (CBP) gave American Seafoods notice of $350 million in penalties for alleged violations of the Jones Act. CBP claimed that the Bayside Canadian Railway is not a "through route" and the exemption in the Jones Act therefore does not apply.

The company sued in federal court, arguing the penalties prevented them from delivering their product, interfering with the affordable supply of pollock for school lunches. A judge allowed the current practice to continue awaiting litigation. However, it appears as if Kloosterboer switched to Russian imported fish by August 19, 2021.

In 2022, a US District Court Judge for the district of Alaska ruled the Bayside Canadian Railway was non-compliant with the Jones Act (though also waiving the CBP's fine). American Seafoods dismantled the railway, as it no longer served a purpose in complying with Jones Act regulations.
