= Kværner =

Norwegian engineering and construction company

Kværner ASA
- Type: Allmennaksjeselskap
- Traded as: OSE: KVAER
- Industry: Heavy industry
- Predecessor: Kvaerner Brug; (1853); Trafalgar House; (1996)
- Founded: 1853
- Defunct: 2005
- Successor: Aker Kvaerner; (2004–2008); Aker Solutions; (2008–2011); Kværner ASA; (2011 onwards)
- Headquarters: Oslo, Norway
- Key people: Karl-Petter Løken, President & CEO
- Number of employees: 2,700
- Website: kvaerner.com

Kværner was a Norwegian engineering and construction services company that existed between 1853 and 2005.

During its initial decades, the firm was involved in the manufacture of cast iron stoves and hydroelectric turbines. The turbine business was Kværner's leading product throughout the first half of the twentieth century, although it had also branched out into the production of bridges, cranes, and pumps. Kværner underwent a spree of international acquisitions during the 1990s, which included Govan Shipbuilders, Götaverken, Trafalgar House, Vyborg Shipyard; its headquarters were also relocated from Oslo to London during this decade. The heavy debt burden built up by acquiring these businesses, some of which were actually unprofitable, jeopardised the company's continued existence by the start of the twenty-first century.

Efforts to stabilise the company included the selling off of Cunard Line and its construction division, as well as the receipt of financial support from senior figures within the Russian oil company Yukos. In order to avoid bankruptcy however, Kværner was compelled to merge with its long time rival Aker ASA. During 2004, Kværner was amalgamated into the newly formed subsidiary of Aker ASA - Aker Kværner, which was renamed Aker Solutions on 3 April 2008.

On 6 May 2011, Kværner re-emerged when the EPC (engineering, procurement and construction) part of Aker Solutions took the Kværner name. The new Kværner company was listed on the Oslo Stock Exchange on 8 July 2011. During 2020 however, Aker Solutions opted to restructure and merge with Kvaerner.

== History ==
Kvaerner Brug was founded in Oslo in 1853 by industrialist Oluf A. Onsum (1820-1899). Early on, the primary activity of the business was its involvement in the production of cast iron stoves. In 1870, Kvaerner built its first hydroelectric turbine. During the early 1900s, Kvaerner power turbines remained the principal product line, which also included bridges, cranes, and pumps. Kvaerner was listed on the Oslo Stock Exchange in 1967. By the 1990s, the company assembled a collection of engineering and industrial businesses, including shipbuilding, construction of offshore oil and gas platforms, production of pulping and paper manufacturing equipment, and operation of a shipping fleet.

Directors-general of Kværner after the stock exchange listing were Kjell B. Langballe (1960–1976), Carl Røtjer (1976–1986) and Mikal H. Grønner (1986–1989). Chairmen were Frithjof A. Lind (–1982), Johan B. Holte (1982–1985), Emil Eriksrud (1985–1986), Carl Røtjer (1986–1989), Kaspar Kielland (1989-1996), and then Christian Bjelland (1996-2001). Since 2011, the CEO has been Jan Arve Haugan.

Erik Tønseth became director-general of Kværner in 1989, and under his leadership the company underwent large-scale international expansion, acquiring the state-owned Govan Shipbuilders from British Shipbuilders. During 1992, Kværner acquired the Swedish company Götaverken. In 1996, Kværner acquired the British conglomerate Trafalgar House, after which it moved its international headquarters from Oslo to London. During January 1996, Kvaerner purchased a stake in the Vyborg Shipyard (Russian: Выборгский судостроительный завод) and renamed it Kverner-Vyborg Shipyard (Russian: ОАО "Квернер-Выборг Верфь") which was the largest manufacturer of offshore installations in Russia. Also during the mid 1990s, Kvaerner expanded its footprint in the Indonesian market, including through the formation of Kvaerner Bakrie Engineering in late 1995.

The company's expansive acquisitions quickly brought economic hardship to the company. Kjell Almskog became Kværner's CEO in 1998, and implemented various plans to streamline the company. This included the sale of the Cunard Line (a division of Trafalgar House) to Carnival Corporation, the sale of Kvaerner Govan to BAE Systems and the sale of Chemrec to Babcock Borsig. On 10 March 2000, Kvaerner sold the Vyborg Shipyard, which was losing money and faced closure during 1999, to the Sergey Zavyalov (Russian: Сергей Завьялов) associated with early 1990s established Ako Barss Group (Russian: "Ако Барсс Груп") which sold the shipyard to Rossiya Bank owners who placed the shipyard in the United Shipbuilding Corporation (USC) in 2012. In August 2000, Kværner sold its Construction Division to the Swedish company Skanska.

The economic slowdown in 2001 coupled with the firm's heavy debt burden and a series of management missteps brought the company to the brink of bankruptcy. Hugo Erikssen, a director of public relations at Yukos, and Oleg Sheiko (Russian: Олег Шейко), Yukos' vice president for finance, and Alexey Golubovich (Russian: Алексей Голубович), who was Yukos' "director of corporate finance" until 2001, supported Kværner with mergers and financing. (Note: Oleg Sheiko (Russian: Олег Шейко; born June 1957) graduated from the Faculty of Economics of Moscow State University in 1981 and the Academy of Foreign Trade in 1992 Following graduation he became a banker with NM Rothschild and Sons Limited in London and later created the Moscow branch and became its manager. He joined Yukos in 1996.)

During the early 2000s, Kværner was approached multiple times by its long time rival Aker ASA, a Norwegian oil services group controlled by Kjell Inge Røkke. During November 2001, in order to avoid bankruptcy, Kværner was compelled to merge with Aker. Røkke scuppered the solution preferred by Kværner's management, which was a rescue by Yukos. Kværner's international headquarters returned to Oslo and Kværner was restructured to become a holding company, with operating activities concentrated in Aker Kværner and Aker Yards. During 2005, Kværner ASA was merged with Aker Maritime Finance AS, a wholly owned company of Aker ASA, as a result of which the Kværner corporation ceased to exist.

During 2008, Aker Kvaerner changed its name to Aker Solutions ASA. In December 2010, Aker Solutions announced a decision to cultivate its core businesses; consequently, Kvaerner was established, through a demerger, as a specialised EPC (engineering, procurement and construction) company addressing the global market. On 6 May 2011, the shareholders' annual general meeting approved the establishment of Kvaerner as a separate company.

In 2015, it commenced fabrication of a 26,500 tonne steel jacket, the largest in Europe, for the Johan Sverdrup partnership. Subsequently, Kvarner was awarded additional work on this scheme.

In September 2019, the company announced their plans to target renewable growth and that it was looking to expand its operations in renewable energy to help boost this growth by around 40% in the coming years. One month later, it signed a contract valued at NOK 1.5 billion for Hywind Tampen, the world's largest floating offshore wind farm. Separately, the company entered into a strategic collaboration with Nel ASA on green hydrogen projects, including the prospective development of large scale hydrogen production plants.

During July 2020, Aker Solutions announced major restructuring plans, centering on its merger with Kvaerner and the spinning off of its wind development and carbon capture and storage businesses into two separate Oslo listed entities.
