= American Seafoods =

American seafood catcher/processor

Coordinates: 47.6115°N 122.3440°W

American Seafoods Group LLC.
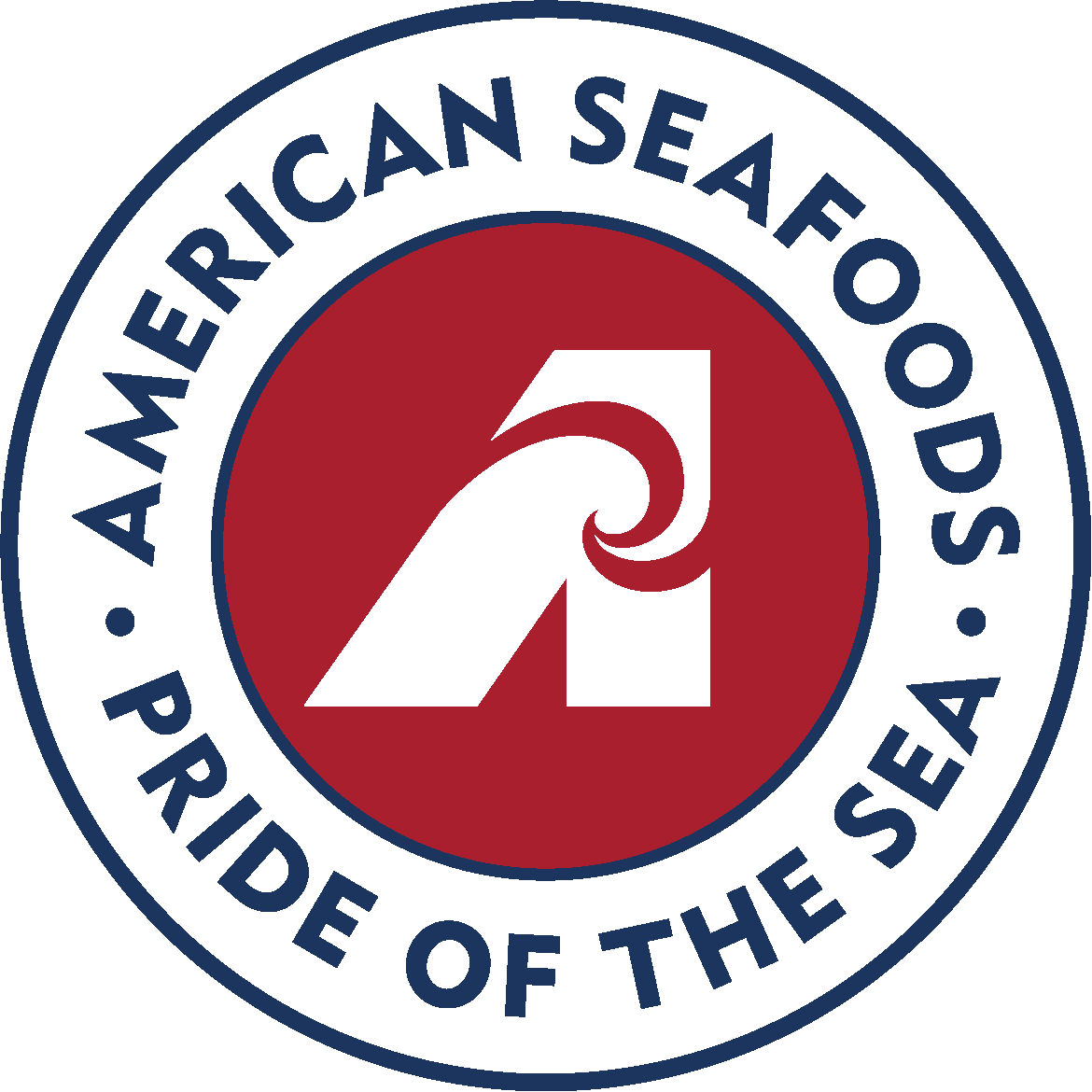
- Company type: Limited liability company (LLC)
- Industry: Fishery
- Founded: 1988, 38 years ago
- Founder: Kjell Inge Røkke
- Headquarters: 2025 First Avenue, Suite 900; Seattle, Washington, U.S.
- Key people: Einar Gustafsson (CEO)
- Products: Seafood
- Website: www.americanseafoods.com

Location in the United States

American Seafoods Group, LLC (ASG) is an American seafood company. Based in Seattle, Washington, ASG owns and operates six large catcher-processor vessels that harvest and process onboard fish caught in the U.S. waters of Alaska and the Pacific Northwest.

American Seafoods Company is owned by American Seafoods Group Consolidated, LLC. Senior leaders of ASG include Einar Gustafsson, CEO; Amy Morris, CFO; Rasmus Soerensen, Chief Commercial Officer. Inge Andreassen is president of American Seafoods Company, a subsidiary of American Seafoods Group.

== History ==
American Seafoods Company was founded by Kjell Inge Røkke in Seattle in 1988, following the passage of the American Fisheries Act in 1998. American Seafoods and seven other companies form the Pollock Conservation Cooperative. American Seafoods Company received 16.572% of Directed Pollock Fishery.

- 1999 – Bernt Bodal, Centre Partners Management, and two other investors bought American Seafoods Company and form American Seafoods Group
- 2001 – American Seafoods Company opens and expands foreign sales offices
  - American Seafoods acquires three freezer long liners in purchase of Pacific Longline Company
  - ASC closes its cryoprotectant additive plant in Kent
- 2002 – American Seafoods Group acquires Southern Pride Catfish Company
- 2006 – Bernt Bodal leads management buyout of Centre Partners interest. Bernt Bodal becomes controlling equity owner
- 2008 – American Seafoods Group acquires catcher-processor Highland Light
  - American Seafoods Group sells Southern Pride Catfish Company
- 2010 – American Seafoods buys out CDQ group Coastal Villages. As part of transaction, American Seafoods transfers ownership of Pacific Longline Company and catcher processor Northern Hawk to Coastal Villages. Bernt Bodal becomes majority equity holder of American Seafoods
- 2013 – American Seafoods Group sells American Pride Seafoods to High Liner Foods, Inc.
- 2017 – American Seafoods Group names Mikel Durham CEO.
- 2022 - American Seafoods Group names Einar Gustafsson CEO

In 2012, the company built the Bayside Canadian Railway – a 220-foot (67 m) railway in Bayside, New Brunswick – to take advantage of a loophole in the Jones Act that otherwise would have required the company to use US-flagged vessels. It was disassembled in April 2023 after a judge determined it to be noncompliant with the act.

== Products ==
American Seafoods catches Alaska Pollock in the Eastern Bering Sea. From this catch, American Seafoods produces whole fillet blocks, surimi made from whole fillets and also from flesh recovered during processing, roe, minced pollock blocks, fish oil, white fish meal, and other "side stream" products such as stomachs, bone meal, fish skins, and milt. Pacific (whiting) hake are caught and produced into Pin Bone Out (PBO), Deep Skinned (DS), and Pin Bone In (PBI) whole fillet blocks as well as surimi, headed and gutted fish, minced blocks, white fish meal, and fish oil. From its Yellowfin sole catches, American Seafoods produces frozen, whole, round fish and headed and gutted frozen blocks. Pacific Cod are processed into fillet blocks, minced blocks, and headed and gutted products.

== American Seafoods fleet ==
Name	Length	Tonnage	Built to fishing vessel in	Year	Engines	Power
American Dynasty	272 ft (83 m)	3471	Ulstein Hatlø, Norway	1989	2, Bergen Diesel, BRM-8	8,000 hp (5,970 kW)
American Triumph	285 ft (87 m)	4294	Langstein Verft, Norway	1990	2, Wärtsilä, 8R32D	8,200 hp (6,110 kW)
Northern Jaeger	336 ft (102 m)	3732	Schichau Seebeck, Germany	1990	2, MAKM453C I-8	7,400 hp (5,520 kW)
Northern Eagle	341 ft (104 m)	4437	Ulstein Hatlø Norway	1988	2, Bergen Diesel, BRM-8	7,200 hp (5,370 kW)
Ocean Rover	256 ft (78 m)	4345	Langstein Verft, Norway	1990	1, Wärtsilä V12-32	6,500 hp (4,850 kW)
Katie Ann	295 ft (90 m)	1593	Raudeberg Verft, Norway	1985	1, Bergen Diesel KVM-18	4,500 hp (3,360 kW)
