= Tinun =

Tinun تينون
- Village
- Location within Iran
- Coordinates: 30°28′34″N 57°18′02″E
- Country: Iran
- Province: Kerman
- County: Kerman
- Bakhsh: Central
- Rural District: Derakhtengan

Population (2006)
  - Total: 40
- Time zone: UTC+3:30 (IRST)
  - Summer (DST): UTC+4:30 (IRDT)

Tinun (Persian: تينون, also Romanized as Tīnūn; also known as Tīnūs and Tītūn) is a village in Derakhtengan Rural District, in the Central District of Kerman County, Kerman Province, Iran. At the 2006 census, its population was 40, in 10 families.
