= Tinus van Doorn =

Dutch painter

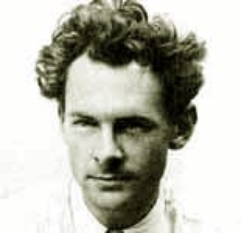
Tinus van Doorn (c.1930), photograph by his wife, Akkie.

Martinus Jacob van Doorn (2 June 1905, Padang – 17 May 1940, Uccle) was a Dutch painter and graphic artist in the Expressionist style.

== Biography ==
He was born in Indonesia. His family returned to the Netherlands when he was eight and settled in The Hague, where he attended the Hogere Burgerschool. During this time, he displayed his artistic abilities by making woodcuts of animals. In 1924, he began his studies at the Royal Academy of Art, graduating in 1928. He lived in Oegstgeest for a year, then moved to Rotterdam, where he met and married the pianist, Annie Vermeulen, known as "Akkie".

He was influenced by the works of Marc Chagall and Franz Marc, experimenting with form and color, which he considered to be the primary conveyor of sentiment and feeling. For his subjects, he began with animals, Biblical scenes and peasants; later moving to vagabonds, circus performers and other people on the fringe of society. In his last paintings, death is a recurrent theme.

In 1931, he was commissioned to provide the sets for La Boîte à Joujoux, a ballet by Claude Debussy. His first major exhibition came at the Stedelijk Museum in 1933. He was unable to earn a steady income entirely from his paintings, however, so he also worked as an illustrator; creating drawings for the works of J. Slauerhoff, Albert Helman, Antoon Coolen and Martinus Nijhoff, among others.

That same year, he moved to Achterhoek, near the German border, and began to be depressed about the political situation. He could see that he would not be allowed to paint as he pleased under the Nazis. In 1938, as German troops made threatening maneuvers, he moved to Belgium. This was to no avail, however. In 1940, when the German army occupied Brussels, he and Akkie committed suicide.

== Selected paintings ==
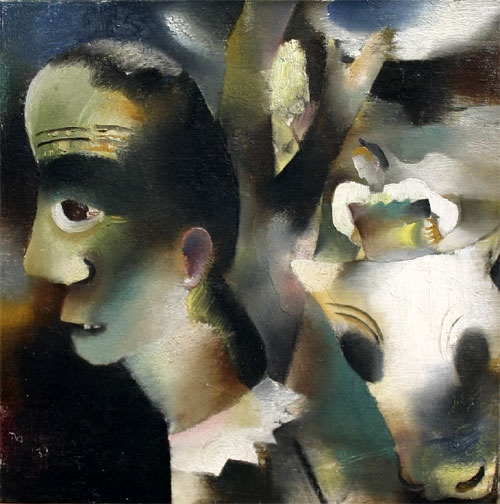
Young Woman with Calf

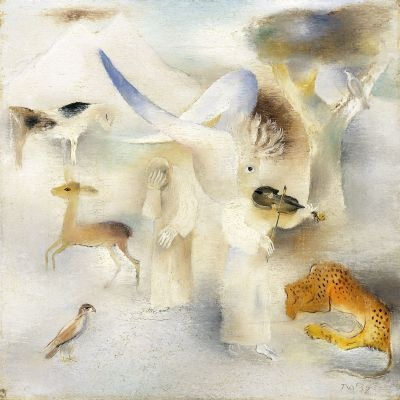
Orpheus Plays for the Animals

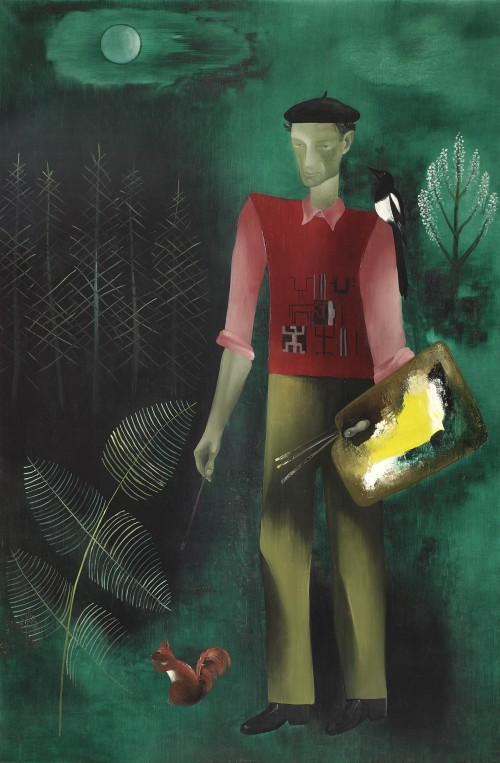
Self-portrait

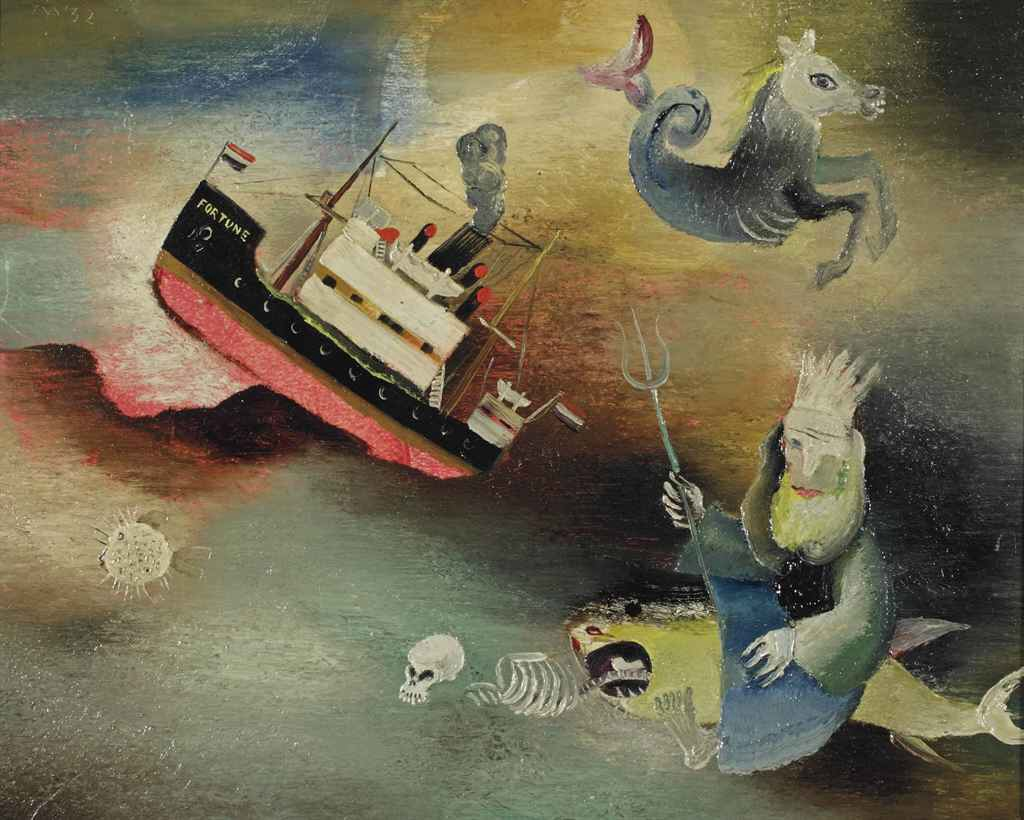
Fortune

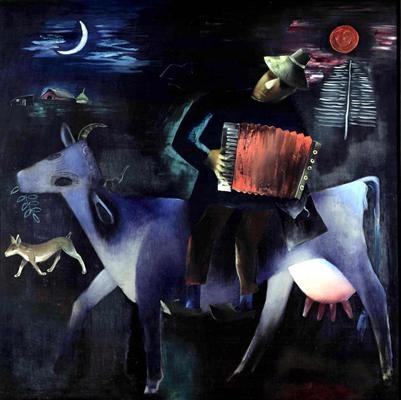
Flemish Kermesse
