= Contextualization (computer science) =

In computer science, contextualization is the process of identifying the data relevant to an entity (e.g., a person or a city) based on the entity's contextual information.

== Definition ==
Context or contextual information is any information about any entity that can be used to effectively reduce the amount of reasoning required (via filtering, aggregation, and inference) for decision making within the scope of a specific application. Contextualisation is then the process of identifying the data relevant to an entity based on the entity's contextual information. Contextualisation excludes irrelevant data from consideration and has the potential to reduce data from several aspects including volume, velocity, and variety in large-scale data intensive applications (Yavari et al.).

== Usage ==
The main usage of "contextualisation" is in improving the process of data:

Reduce the amount of data: Contextualisation has the potential to reduce the amount of data based on the interests from applications/services/users. Contextualisation can improve the scalability and efficiency of data process, query, delivery by excluding irrelevant data.
As an example, ConTaaS facilitates contextualisation of the data for IoT applications and could improve the processing for large-scale IoT applications from various Big Data aspects including volume, velocity, and variety.

== Example domains ==
- Object-oriented programming: Contextualization consists, at object creation time, to provide adequate initialization parameters to a class constructor.
- Virtualization: Contextualization permits, at the end of VM instantiation, to set or override VM data having unknown or default values at the time of creation of the Live CD, typically hostname, IP address, .ssh/authorized_keys, ...
