= Emil Eriksrud =

Emil Harboe Eriksrud (27 January 1926 – 8 March 1990) was a Norwegian businessperson and judge.

He graduated with the Candidate of Law degree in 1949, and also took the average adjuster examination. He was a deputy judge in Tromsø, lecturer in jurisprudence at the University of Oslo and junior solicitor before becoming a barrister at the age of 34. In 1960 he was hired as a jurist in the corporation Hafslund. In 1974 he attended the six-week Advanced Management Program at Harvard University.

He became vice chief executive of Hafslund in 1976, and was the chief executive from 1979 to 1987. Among the important things to happen during his presidency was the acquisition of Actinor and thereby Nycomed in 1986. After retreating from Hafslund he served as presiding judge in Eidsivating Court of Appeal for some years until his death in 1990.

He chaired Kværner Industrier from 1985 to 1986. and Sunnmørsbanken from 1988 to 1989. He was a supervisory council member of Kreditkassen. He was buried in Ullern.

Business positions
| Preceded by Fredrik Stang Heffermehl | Chief executive of Hafslund; 1979–1987 | Succeeded by Svein Aaser |
| Preceded by Johan B. Holte | Chair of Kværner; 1985–1986 | Succeeded by Carl Røtjer |
