= Erik Tønseth =

Norwegian jurist and industrialist (1946–2022)

Erik Tønseth (7 August 1946 – 12 December 2022) was a Norwegian jurist and industrialist.

Tønseth was born in Drøbak and held the cand.jur. degree. He headed the agricultural branch of Norsk Hydro from 1979. He was CEO of Kværner Industrier from 1989 to 1998. He was a fellow of the Norwegian Academy of Technological Sciences.

Tønseth died in Oslo on 12 December 2022, at the age of 76.
