= Aker Holding =

Aker Holding AS
- Company type: Private
- Industry: Holding company
- Founded: 2007
- Headquarters: Oslo, Norway
- Area served: Norway
- Parent: Aker Group (60.0%); Norwegian Ministry of Trade and Industry (30.0%); SAAB (7.5%); Investor (2.5%)
- Subsidiaries: Aker Kværner (40.1%)

Aker Holding is a holding company that owns 40.27% of Aker Solutions. It manages the ownership of four major owners in the company, through a common agreement to insure negative control over the company.

Ownership:

- Aker ASA (60.0%)
- Norwegian Ministry of Trade and Industry (30.0%)
- SAAB (7.5%)
- Investor (2.5%)

== Background ==
On 22 June 2007 Aker ASA and the Government of Norway announced the creation of the holding company. Aker ASA would transfer its entire ownership of the company to the holding company, and sell 40% of the holding company. Aker received NOK 6.4 billion for the transaction.

The purpose of creating this company is to keep Aker Solutions part of important and valuable Norwegian technology, in Norway for the next 10 years. The partners of Aker Holding can not sell their part of the holding company for at least 10 years.
