= Havfisk =

Norwegian seafood company

Havfisk ASA
- Company type: Allmennaksjeselskap
- Industry: Fishing
- Founded: 2005
- Headquarters: Ålesund, Norway
- Area served: Norway
- Key people: Yngve Myhre (CEO)
- Products: Seafood
- Revenue: ▲NOK 2,316 million (2005)
- Operating income: NOK 181 million (2005)
- Net income: NOK 98 million (2005)
- Number of employees: 1,267 (2005)
- Parent: Lerøy
- Website: www.havfisk.no

Havfisk (formerly Aker Seafoods) is a Norwegian Whitefish fishing, seafood processing and sale company. The company was listed on the Oslo Stock Exchange and has its headquarters in Ålesund, Norway.

The company operates 15 fishing trawlers north of 62 degrees in Norway with 9% of the total concessions in the area. Aker Seafoods also owns and operates eleven processing plants with six in Norway and five in Denmark. The company has an integrated chain so two thirds of the processing capacity is served with self-fished fish. Among the companies that use Aker Seafoods' produce are Findus, Nestlé, Pieters, Primex, Seachill, Unilever and Young’s Bluecrest.

Aker Seafoods was created in 2005 as a merger between Norway Seafoods (a subsidiary of Aker), West Fish-Aarsæther and Nordic Sea Holding. The company was listed on the Oslo Stock Exchange in May 2005.

On August 30, 2010, the Norwegian Coast Guard discovered illegal dumping of cod from Aker Seafoods' trawler Doggi. The inspection also exposed inappropriate keeping of logbooks. Norwegian Directorate of Fisheries has decided that Aker cannot fish with the Doggi from 1 January 2011 to 30 April 2012.

In 2013, Aker Seafoods changed the name of the company to Havfisk.

Havfisk was acquired by Lerøy in 2016.
