= Kjell Inge Røkke =

Norwegian businessman

- Born: 25 October 1958 (age 67); Molde, Møre og Romsdal, Norway
- Occupation: Businessman
- Spouses: Kari Monsen Røkke (m. 1980; div. 1992) Anne Grete Eidsvig (m. 2004)
- Children: 4

Kjell Inge Røkke (born 25 October 1958) is a Norwegian billionaire businessman. He is the chairman of the Norwegian-based company Aker ASA, and holds directorships in Aker BP, Kværner, Ocean Yield, Aker BioMarine and Aker Energy. As of 31 December 2018, Røkke owned 68.2% of the shares in Aker ASA through his investment company, TRG AS, and its subsidiaries.

In 2018, he was considered the richest person in Norway, with a fortune estimated at NOK 20.6 billion, (approximately US$2.4 billion).

== Career ==
Røkke began his career as a fisherman at the age of 18, without any secondary or higher education. In 1979, he moved to the United States to work on trawlers in Alaska, saving enough money to buy his first vessels. He eventually became the owner of American Seafoods Group.

During the 1980s, Røkke was based in Seattle, Washington, where he owned and operated American Seafoods and Resource Group International (RGI), which included brands like Brooks Sports and Helly Hansen. In the mid-1990s, he returned to Norway. In 1996, Røkke became Aker ASA's main shareholder when RGI acquired enough shares to become its largest shareholder; the two companies subsequently merged, completing the merger in January 1997. Through Aker, Røkke gained a significant position in the fisheries sector and acquired the well-established fishery business J.M. Johansen, which dates back to 1876. The new company portfolio also included real estate and shipyards.

Røkke is currently the largest shareholder of Aker ASA, an industrial investment company, which interests are concentrated in the oil and gas, maritime assets and marine biotechnology sectors. The company's industrial holdings include Aker BP, Aker Solutions, Akastor, Kværner, Ocean Yield, Aker Energy, Cognite, and Aker BioMarine. Its financial investments comprise cash, liquid assets, and real estate development projects.

In an interview with the Norwegian newspaper Aftenposten (published 1 May 2017) Røkke said he planned to give away most of his fortune. As a further step in this plan, he joined the Giving Pledge in 2017 and founded the REV Ocean initiative. REV Ocean, led by former WWF Norway CEO, Nina Jensen, works to improve understanding of the ocean and foster solutions through three initiatives: the world's largest research and expedition vessel (REV Ocean), the World Ocean Headquarters, and an open, global data platform. A 183m research and expedition vessel, the REV Ocean, is due for final delivery to Røkke in 2022. The world's longest superyacht, it is reported to have three swimming-pools and a 35-seat auditorium.

Røkke has dyslexia, but claims that it has contributed to his success, and states that he would not be where he is today without it.

Røkke has been described by Forbes as having "built up a reputation as a ruthless corporate raider".

In 2005, Røkke was selected to the top manager in Norway by Dagens Næringsliv. Among the 18 nominees, Røkke received nearly 1/3 of the votes.

In 2006, Røkke won the “Peer Gynt of the Year” award. The prize is given every year to a person or institution that has distinguished him- or herself within Norway and have improved Norway's international reputation. Members of the Peer Gynt Festival itself, parliamentary representatives and former winners of the year's Peer Gynt prize may propose candidates for the award.

== Donations ==
In May 2017, Røkke and his wife joined the Gates-Buffett The Giving Pledge, an elite network of big philanthropic givers. Pledge members promise to devote the majority of their wealth to philanthropic causes during their lifetimes or after their death.

In May 2017, Røkke announced that he is funding the purchase of the world's largest and most advanced research vessel, the REV Ocean. The 182.9-meter-long vessel was initially launched in 2019 but is scheduled to be completed in 2024. Equipment on board the research ship enables researchers to take measurements from the atmosphere as well as 6,000 meters below the surface of the sea – including up to 20 meters under the seabed. Submarines and both under and overwater drones can be attached to the research vessel, which houses an auditorium and seven laboratories. The ship is able to collect and incinerate up to five tonnes of plastic every day without releasing any harmful emissions. Røkke's desire to use his fortune to benefit society lies behind the idea to fund the ship. Røkke also told Aftenposten that he was concerned about both climate change and plastic pollution in the seas, but that his passion for science was one of the key elements in his funding the project. The research expedition vessel will be available for expeditions and research as well as for hire as a private yacht, according to the report. Income will be used to reduce maintenance costs and help fund research and equipment costs. Røkke is paying for the construction and operation of a research vessel that will have a crew of 30 and accommodate 60 researchers. The boat was built at a Romanian shipyard of Italian yacht builder Fincantieri.

Together with his wife, Anne Grete Eidsvig, Røkke has established the Aker Scholarship in partnership with Aker ASA to support Norwegian students' graduate studies at internationally leading universities. Aker Scholarship's objective is to inspire recipients to make a difference in the development of Norwegian business, industry, and society. Røkke's family's company, TRG, finances Aker Scholarships through donations to their Foundation of Education; Aker ASA administers the scholarship program. The purpose of the Aker Scholarship is to offer highly qualified candidates, with a strong link to Norway, an opportunity to pursue an advanced degree at a high-level university, and to support the development of the scholar's social commitment.

In 2018, Røkke and TRG, along with the other Aker companies, founded Stiftelsen VI (The VI Foundation). Røkke's privately owned company, TRG, provided the foundation's starting capital of NOK 25 million. Stiftelsen VI aspires to become a resource and competence centre for disabled people's opportunities and rights, and create equal opportunities to perform. Amongst other things, VI wants to inspire and motivate to physical activity. Aker ASA, Aker-owned companies and Kjell Inge Røkke's private company TRG have committed to a contribution of NOK 125 million over the next five years.

In 2017, Røkke gave a donation to the family's local soccer club, Frisk Asker, to fund new artificial turf and a new clubhouse. Røkke has previously given NOK 10 million (approx US$1.19 million) to fund 20 mini-pitches for local sports teams and housing associations in his home municipality, Asker. When Røkke and his family moved to Asker in 2010, he helped finance a walking and cycling route in the area.

== Personal life ==
Røkke is married, with four children, and lives in Vettre, Norway. He is known for having several exclusive cars, including a Ford GT acquired in August 2016. In September 2022, he announced that he is moving to Lugano, Switzerland.

== Football ==
Røkke is also known for his involvement in football, and became involved with Norwegian club Molde FK in 1993. He was also central to the funding of the club's new stadium, which got the nickname "Røkkeløkka" (English: "The Røkke Park"). Some estimates suggest that he has spent about NOK 400 million funding the club.

Røkke, along with his former business partner Bjørn Rune Gjelsten, also bought into Wimbledon Football Club in the late 1990s, becoming a joint owner of the team in 2000. The following year, with the club homeless since leaving their Plough Lane ground in 1991 and playing at Crystal Palace's Selhurst Park stadium in Croydon, southeast London, Røkke and Gjelsten, along with chairman Charles Koppel and businessman Pete Winkelman agreed to relocate the team from London to Milton Keynes, a town around 60 miles from their traditional base. The move was controversial and sparked a year of protest at matches from Wimbledon fans, determined not to let their club be 'franchised'. Although common in American sport, the relocation of a professional English football club had never been done before. After rejections from the Football League and The FA, the decision was eventually passed on to a three-man arbitration panel, the outcome being two to one in favour of the move. Wimbledon fans, outraged with the decision, agreed to form a new club to support, AFC Wimbledon, and declared a boycott on their former team. The following season, Wimbledon FC would go on to play in front of record low crowds, including just 664 for a League Cup game against Rotherham, before finally completing the move in September 2003. It renamed itself a year later, adopting the name Milton Keynes Dons.

== Boat license conviction ==
In 2005, Røkke was convicted of bribery and license fraud after paying a Swedish official to issue skipper's licenses to Røkke himself, his butler, and a Norwegian ship broker. The skipper's license came into focus after Røkke's yacht, the Celina Bella, ran aground near Strömstad in 2001. Røkke eventually served 24–25 days in jail of a 120-day prison and probation sentence, before being released on parole.
