= Aker BioMarine =

Norwegian fishing and biotech company

Aker BioMarine AS
- Type: Public (OSE: AKBM)
- Industry: Marine biotechnology
- Headquarters: Oslo, Norway
- Key people: Matts Johansen (CEO); Ola Snøve (chair)
- Revenue: 469 million kr (2012)
- Operating income: NOK –35 million (2012)
- Net income: NOK –66 million (2012)
- Number of employees: 32 (2026)
- Website: www.akerbiomarine.com

Aker BioMarine is a norwegian company that develops krill-derived products for consumer health and nutrition.

It is the world's largest catcher of krill, with 64% of 620,000 metric tons of krill taken from the Southern Ocean in 2025. Given the resulting impact risk on the Antarctica ecosystem and whales, Aker BioMarine is the subject of critics, its ship Antarctic Sea being struck by Paul Watson's ship Bandero on March 31, 2026.

== History ==
Aker BioMarine was established as an independent enterprise in 2006, building on years of deep-sea fishing experience as part of Norway's Aker Group. Its previous business activities were with the exception of the biotechnology company Natural, previously organized under Aker Seafoods Holding, a 100 percent subsidiary of Aker ASA. In 2003, Aker BioMarine began harvesting and processing Antarctic krill. Aker BioMarine claims to solve the problem of harvesting krill in both a commercially viable and environmentally sound way through its proprietary "ECO-HARVESTING" technology. The company re-listed on the Oslo Stock Exchange on July 6, 2020.

== Technology and products ==
Aker BioMarine produces krill products rich in omega-3 phospholipids. Krill is mainly used for the production of krill meal and krill oil, which in turn is used for animal or aquaculture feed and for human consumption through health products and omega-3 supplements.

The company has registered Superba as the company’s brand name for nutraceuticals and Qrill as the company’s brand name for its krill meal and krill oil products for aquaculture.

According to a 2009 animal study, supplementation with Superba krill oil led to a substantially greater reduction in heart and liver fat in obese rats than omega-3 from fish oil. In a company sponsored feeding trial, krill-fed salmon acquired 11% greater body weight than that of the fish in the control group.

In 2011, krill oil was classified as generally recognized as safe (GRAS) for use as a human food ingredient.

The Marine Stewardship Council (MSC) certified "ECO-HARVESTING" as sustainable on June 15, 2010, but WWF and the Antarctic and Southern Ocean Coalition are objecting this decision, arguing that krill harvesting puts wildlife and humpback whales at risk.

== Fleet ==
As of 2024, Aker Biomarine operates a fleet consisting of four vessels, Three factory trawlers, and one support vessel, which transports krill from the trawlers, and crew and supplies to the trawlers, similarly to a platform supply vessel and reefer.

Name	Type	Year built
Antarctic Endurance	Trawler	2019
Saga Sea	Trawler	1975/1999 Converted 2005
Antarctic Sea	Trawler/factory	1999 Converted 2009
Antarctic Provider	Support Vessel	2021

== Awards and accomplishments ==
Aside from Superba receiving GRAS status and achieving MSC certification, the company received the "Investment in the Future Award 2012" from Nutrition Business Journal. Aker BioMarine received the award for "strategically investing more than $550 million to build out the krill supply chain in the Antarctic with a long-term focus on sustainable harvesting".

== Memberships and associations ==
Aker BioMarine works closely with WWF-Norway and the Commission for the Conservation of Antarctic Marine Living Resources (CCAMLR) as well as independent scientists and marine conservationists to ensure that the company contributes to the well-being of the krill fishery and the Antarctic food chain. To that end, Aker BioMarine is a founding member of the Association of Responsible Krill harvesting companies (ARK), which works with CCAMLR to ensure a healthy and sustainable krill population in Antarctica.
