= Glommens Træsliberi =

Norwegian wood pulp company

- Type: Aksjeselskap
- Industry: Wood pulp
- Founded: 1886
- Defunct: 1929
- Fate: Closed in favor of power production
- Headquarters: Kykkelsrudfossen, Askim, Østfold, Norway
- Products: Wood pulp

Glommens Træsliberi was a wood-grinding mill that produced wood pulp at the Kykkelsrudfossen waterfall in Askim in Indre Østfold Municipality in Østfold county. The mill operated from 1886 until its closure in 1929.

== History ==
There were no wood-grinding mills on the Lower Glomma until Anders C. Furuholmen, later mayor of Askim, built Glommens Træsliberi in 1886. An energetic, far-sighted, and technically able man, he contributed much to Askim's industrialization. He had married the daughter of Kykkelsrud farm in 1866 and with her took over the property and its waterfall rights in the Glomma, and among his first undertakings was rebuilding the farm's mill and sawmill. When the railway reached Askim in 1882, it greatly improved transport in the district, and Furuholmen began planning a wood pulp factory.

Furuholmen was involved in business ventures in several places and kept expanding his operations at Kykkelsrud. Realizing his plans for a mill depended on finding well-funded partners, and he found them by selling Kykkelsrudfossen, along with the land needed to build the mill, to the shipowner Johan Smith of Tvedestrand in exchange for 10,000 kroner in shares in the business. The firm was founded with the saddler Lilloe of Christiania and Smith as its principal partners.

The mill was built for an annual output of 7,500 tonnes of 50 percent wet wood pulp. Operations went well, and in 1900 the factory was expanded to 11,000 tonnes, switching to hot grinding with four grinding machines, six refiners, and sixteen pulp take-up machines. It became one of the district's most important workplaces, drawing workers from a wide area, including the border regions of Sweden, and around 1900 it employed 50 to 60 people.

Before the mill was established, disagreements with the Glomma's timber-floating management had created problems for Furuholmen's plans, so at the outset he took on the floating of timber to the mill himself, along with the transport of the finished pulp to Askim. For many years the pulp was carried by horse and cart to Askim station and then by train to the large paper factories in Sarpsborg and Fredrikshald (Halden). A large warehouse was built at the station, but a railway siding was later laid to Kykkelsrud so the pulp could be loaded onto rail cars near the factory.

== From wood pulp production to power station ==
Before the turn of the century, Furuholmen set out to use the flow of the Glomma to generate electric power, and in 1898 he formed Aktieselskabet Glommens Træsliberi to raise capital for a power plant, folding all his properties and operations, the mill included, into the new company. Serious financial trouble followed soon after construction began, and the project was saved only when the German firm Schuckert & Co, a part-owner of the power company A/S Hafslund in Sarpsborg, came in as an owner. Fresh difficulties arose just before Kykkelsrud power station was completed in 1903, and the German company took over Glommens Træsliberi entirely.

Furuholmen was left with heavy debts and went bankrupt at the petition of his creditor Askim Sparebank, though he was allowed to live at Kykkelsrud farm until his death in 1909.

The company's turn toward power production made the mill less important, and it was leased to the Christiania firm A/S Lilloe & Smith, which ran it until 1926; output reached 17,000 tonnes of 50 percent wet wood pulp a year in 1921. A/S Hafslund took over Kykkelsrud power station in 1910 and ran the mill as well from 1926 to 1929. By then wood pulp prices had been poor for so many years that profitable operation was impossible, and the mill closed for good. The mill buildings were demolished in 1939 to make way for a new dam for the power station.

== Bibliography ==
- Idland, Tor (2001). Fra ville stryk til fossekraft 1860–1914. Askim kommune.
- Idland, Tor, ed. (1995). Gjør din plikt, krev din rett. Askim: Askim og omegn faglige samorganisasjon.
- Grøteig, Truls. Trekk fra et arbeidermiljø 1900–1904. Askim.
- Furuholmen, Gunerius (1945). Christen Furuholmen og hans slekt. Trekk fra familiens liv. Oslo.
- Svendsen, Åsmund (2004). Fylke i grenseland, vol. 4 of Østfolds historie. Østfold fylkeskommune.
