= Marthinus =

Marthinus or Martinus is an old Dutch, Danish or Norwegian male given name - a Latinised form of Martin.

Notable people with this name include:

- Marthinus Bekker (1933–2022), South African Navy officer
- Marthinus Jacobus Oosthuizen (1818–1897), South African voortrekker
- Marthinus Otto (born 1980), South African cricketer
- Marthinus du Plessis (born 1932), South African pentathlete
- Marthinus Wessel Pretorius (1819–1901), South African politician
- Marthinus Prinsloo (1838–1903), Orange Free State farmer, politician and commander-in-chief in the Second Boer War
- Marthinus Nikolaas Ras (1853–1900), South African farmer
- Marthinus van Schalkwyk (born 1959), South African politician
- Marthinus Theunis Steyn (1857–1916), South African lawyer, politician, and statesman
- Martinus Thomsen (1890–1981), Danish author, philosopher and mystic.
- Marthinus Versfeld or Martin Versfeld (1909–1995), South African philosopher
