= Aker Solutions =

Norwegian energy infrastructure engineering company

Coordinates: 59°53′50.46″N 10°37′39.98″E

Aker Solutions ASA

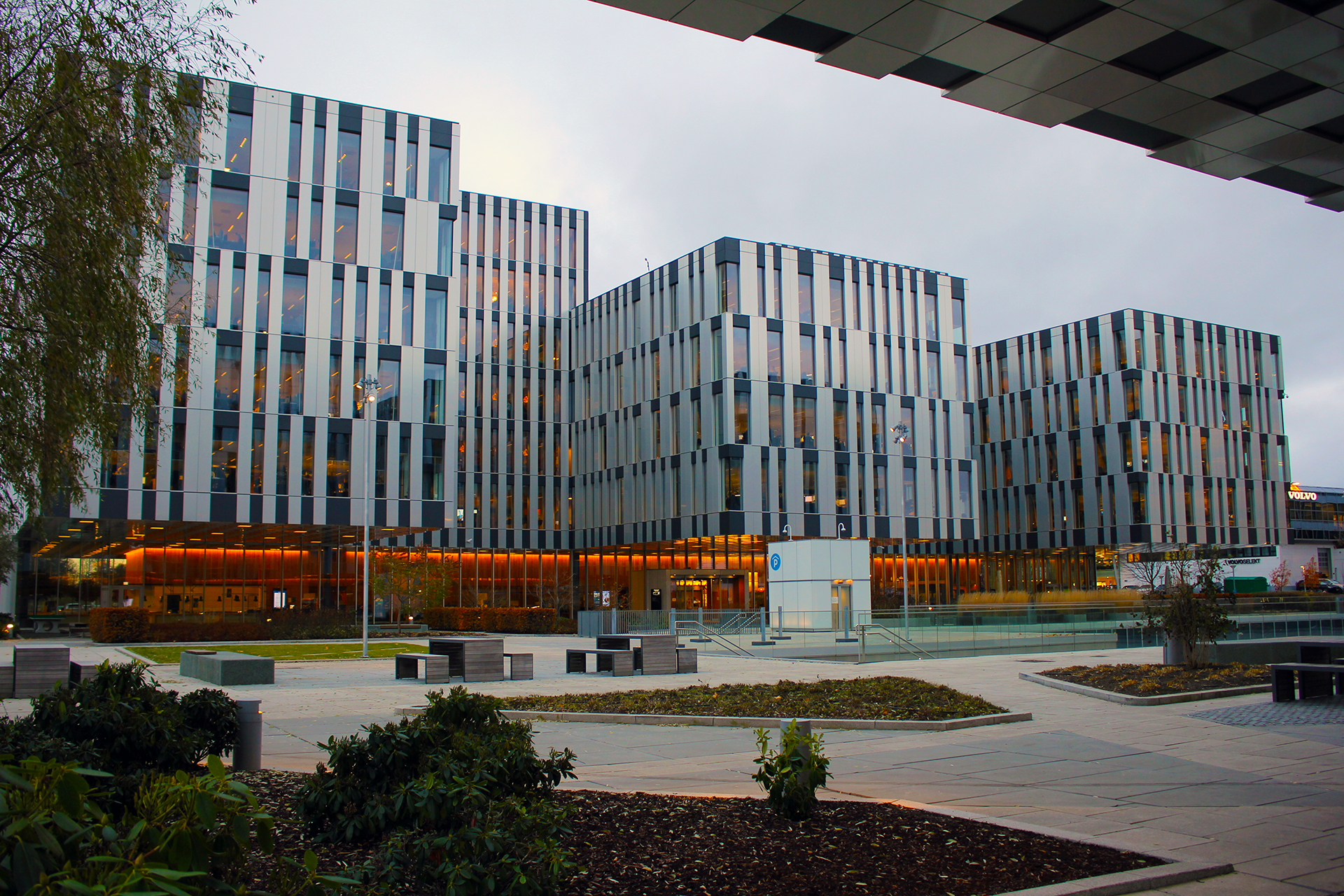
- Type: Allmennaksjeselskap
- Traded as: OSE: AKSO
- Industry: Oilfield services Engineering
- Predecessor: Aker Mechanical Workshop (1841)
- Founded: Aker Solutions (2008); Aker Kværner (2004); Kværner Brug (1853); Aker Mechanical Workshop (1841)
- Headquarters: Fornebu, Norway
- Area served: Worldwide
- Key people: Leif-Arne Langøy (chairman); Paal Eikeseth (CEO); Idar Eikrem (CFO)
- Revenue: NOK 22,461 million (2017)
- Operating income: NOK 571 million (2017)
- Net income: 1,179,000,000 Norwegian krone (2022)
- Total assets: NOK 19,736 million (2017)
- Number of employees: 6,000
- Parent: Aker ASA
- Website: www.akersolutions.com

Aker Solutions ASA is a Norwegian engineering firm headquartered at Fornebu close to Oslo. The firm's production is focused on energy infrastructure, including systems and services required to de-carbonize oil and gas production, build wind-to-grid infrastructure and engineer CO_{2} capture and sequestration.

Founded in 1841 as Akers Mekaniske Verksted, the company has been known as Aker, Aker Kvaerner and Aker Solutions (2008). Aker Kværner was founded in 2004 from the major restructuring of a complex "Aker Kværner" business unit formed in 2002 by the merger of Aker Maritime and Kværner Oil & Gas. The company was majority controlled by Aker ASA until 2007. Then, via major ownership restructuring on 22 June 2007, Aker ASA gave up its holding in Aker Solutions and transferred a 40% stake to Aker Holding, which in turn was owned by Aker ASA (60%), the Norwegian Ministry of Trade and Industry (30%), SAAB (7.5%) and Investor AB (2.5%). On 3 April 2008, Aker Kværner was renamed Aker Solutions.

In 2020, the company merged with Kværner ASA. As of 2023, the company trades on the Oslo stock exchange under the symbol 'AKSO'.

== History ==
=== 1841 to 2002: Evolution of Aker Kvaerner ===
Aker Solutions derives from a series of start-ups and mergers of Norwegian companies across the 19th, 20th and 21st centuries.

In 1841, Aker established its first workshop along the Aker river in Oslo, called Aker Mechanical Workshop (Aker Mekaniske Verksted).

Kværner Brug was founded in Oslo in 1853. In 1943, Kværner Brug and partner Myrens Verksted jointly acquired a majority shareholding in Thunes Mekaniske Verksted.

Joint holding company Kværner Industries AS was established in December 1967, listing on the Oslo Stock Exchange. The Kværner Group entered the offshore oil and gas market from its base in Oslo, and Kværner Engineering, an engineering and contracting company, was set up in the late 1960s.

In 1993, construction work began at the Guantanamo Bay detention camp through jointly owned subsidiary, Kværner Process Services Inc. (KPSI), initiating a business partnership with the US Department of Defense that lasted until 2006.

In 1996, Kværner acquired UK-based conglomerate Trafalgar House, increasing its interests in shipbuilding, oil and gas, pulp and paper, engineering and construction. The company's international headquarters was moved to London.

In 1999, the company initiated a major sell-off to raise money via divestment, but financial and operational problems persisted, and the company entered an acute liquidity crisis in August 2001. In July 2000, Aker Maritime ASA, a Norway-based offshore products, technology and services provider, bought 26% of the shares in Kværner ASA. In November 2001, Aker Maritime ASA and Kværner ASA reached an agreement, whereby Aker Maritime injected NOK 2.8 bn in net assets, raised another NOK 3.5 bn through two direct issues, and renegotiated NOK 8.6 bn of Kværner's debt. The following year the group adopt the Aker Kvaerner brand for the entire group.

=== 2002 to 2008: Aker Kværner and Aker Solutions ===
Logo of Aker Kværner prior to company renaming.

Having resulted from a merger of Aker Maritime and Kværner Oil & Gas in 2002, a major business restructuring of Aker Kværner was launched in 2004. This led to the formation of two industrial groups: Aker Kværner, working with oil, gas, energy and process engineering, and shipbuilding Aker Yards. Aker Kværner also became a minor shareholder in the Finnish engineering company Aker Arctic in 2004. Aker Kvaerner started trading on the Oslo Stock Exchange under the ticker symbol 'AKVER' on 2 April 2004.

In 2006, the company's pulp-and-paper and power businesses were sold to Finnish-based Metso for €335 million. On 7 June 2007, a deal was announced to sell a 40.1 percent stake of the company from Aker ASA to Aker Holding. The new company was owned by Aker ASA (60%), the Norwegian Ministry of Trade and Industry (30%), SAAB (7.5%) and Investor (2.5%).

In 2007, the company was identified by Amnesty International as an accessory to torture and other human rights abuses for its collaboration in constructing and maintaining the US detention camp at Guantanamo Bay.

=== 2008 to 2020: Aker Solutions ===
During the AGM held on 3 April 2008, Aker Kværner announced that it would rebrand as Aker Solutions.

Between April 2010 and June 2010, the company won three contracts from Noble Energy to supply steel tube umbilicals, a complete mono-ethylene glycol (MEG) reclamation unit, and subsea control equipment for the construction of offshore oil platforms in the Tamar gas field in Israel. Together, the contracts were worth NOK 1.1 billion.

On 6 May 2011, Aker Solutions' EPC (engineering, procurement and construction) division was re-branded and spun off as a new company, Kværner ASA, listed on the Oslo Stock Exchange in the third-quarter of 2011. Aker Solutions' holding company — Aker Holdings AS — was renamed Aker Kværner Holding AS, and held around 40% of Kværner ASA. Aker ASA took over the 10% stake owned by Saab and Investor AB, raising its stake in Aker Kværner Holdings AS to 70%.

In 2014, Aker Solutions was further divided into two companies, Aker Solutions and Akastor, and in August Aker Solutions leased the entire first phase of the new Aberdeen International Business Park.

On 18 February 2015, the company announced the loss of around 300 jobs in Norway as a response to falling oil prices and the decline in demand for drilling services.

In November 2020, Aker Solutions merged with Kværner ASA.

== See also ==
- Sea Launch
- List of companies
- Aker Maritime
- Aker Holding
