= Aker ASA =

Aruba company

Coordinates: 59°54′32.27″N 10°43′29.46″E

- Formerly: Resource Group International (until 1996)
- Type: Allmennaksjeselskap
- Traded as: OSE: AKER
- Industry: Holding company
- Founded: 1841; 185 years ago
- Headquarters: Fornebu, Norway
- Key people: Øyvind Eriksen (President and CEO), Kjell Inge Røkke (Chairman of the board and main owner)
- Owner: TRG Holding (66.66%)
- Number of employees: 28,000 (2020)
- Website: www.akerasa.com

Aker ASA is a Norwegian industrial investment company with ownership interests concentrated in oil and gas, renewable energy and green technologies, industrial software, seafood and marine biotechnology sectors. The company is listed on Oslo Stock Exchange. Aker's main shareholder is Kjell Inge Røkke, who owns 68.2% per cent of Aker through his company TRG Holding AS. The corporate headquarters are located in Fornebu, Norway. Aker was established in 1841 when Akers Mekaniske Verksted was founded in Oslo.

== Group companies ==
As of 31 December 2022, Aker's industrial holdings include:

- Currently owned
  - Aker BP
  - Aker Solutions
  - Aker Energy
  - Aker Horizons
  - Aker BioMarine
  - Cognite
  - Aize

== History ==
The company takes its name from the former Akers mekaniske Verksted, which was Norway's largest shipyard and which closed in 1982. In 1987 one of the surviving companies split off from the shipyard merged with Norcem, creating a large cement group in Norway with focus on the offshore industry. The cement business was sold in 1999.

Kjell Inge Røkke used his investment company Resource Group International to purchase large amounts of Aker shares, and merged the two companies in 1996 to form Aker RGI. In 1999, after clearing European anti-monopoly concerns, Aker and Apax Partners merged their warehouse technologies and material handling units to form the Dexion Group Ltd (Apax) and Constructor AS (Aker); in 2000, the Dexion Group was acquired by Aker and merged with Constructor, while the Australia/Asia Pacific operations were sold.

During the early 2000s, Kværner was approached multiple times by its long time rival Kværner, which had entered a period of considerable hardship following an ambitious programme of international expansion. During November 2001, in order to avoid bankruptcy, Kværner was compelled to merge with Aker. Thereafter, Kværner's international headquarters returned to Oslo and Kværner was restructured to become a holding company, with operating activities concentrated in Aker Kværner and Aker Yards. During 2005, Kværner ASA was merged with Aker Maritime Finance AS, a wholly owned company of Aker ASA, as a result of which the Kværner corporation ceased to exist.

In 2007, as part of the Aker Material Handling group of companies, Constructor/Dexion was sold to the Swedish finance investor Altor Equity Partners. In December 2010, Aker Solutions announced a decision to cultivate its core businesses; consequently, Kvaerner was established, through a demerger, as a specialised EPC (engineering, procurement and construction) company addressing the global market. On 6 May 2011, the shareholders' annual general meeting approved the establishment of Kvaerner as a separate company.

During 2016, Aker founded the industrial software company Cognite, which targeted the digitalisation of processes across the oil industry as well as other sectors, as part of ambitions to improve efficiency and reduce costs. Three years later, it was announced that Cognite had doubled its revenue to 340 million Norwegian crowns; it had also opened new offices in Tokyo and Texas to better serve these markets. In February 2022, the Saudi Arabian oil company Aramco purchase a 7.4 per cent stake in Cognite from Aker in exchange for roughly one billion Norwegian crowns. Throughout the early 2020s, Aker was considered an initial public offering of Cognite.

During July 2020, Aker Solutions announced major restructuring plans, centering on its merger with Kvaerner and the spinning off of its wind development and carbon capture and storage businesses into two separate Oslo-listed entities. That same year, Røkke announced that Aker's strategy for the 2020s was centered around increasing the value of its IT and low carbon energy businesses and a deemphasis of its traditional oil and gas operations. The company has continued to play an active role in the oil and gas sector, not only in existing schemes but also in exploration and other activities.

In 2021, Aker ASA and SalMar jointly established SalMar Aker Ocean, a global offshore aquaculture company. During 2021, the firm launched a new consultancy business; three years later, by which point it had 300 employees worldwide, the consultancy business was rebranded as Entr. In early 2022, both Aker Clean Hydrogen and Aker Offshore Wind were merged into Aker Horizon. That same year, Aker BP and Lundin's oil and gas activities merged.

During 2023, the firm agreed terms for a financial support package, valued at NOK2.25 billion ($200 million), to Solstad Shipholding. That same year, Aker Energy was sold to the Africa Finance Corporation. In 2024, SLB acquired a majority stake in Aker Carbon Capture Holding..

=== Aker Floating Production ===
Aker Floating Production ASA
- Type: Public
- Industry: Petroleum
- Founded: 2006
- Headquarters: Oslo, Norway
- Key people: Arne Hygen Tørnkvist (CEO); Martinus Brandal (Chair)
- Products: Floating Production Storage and Offloading
- Number of employees: 46 (2025)
- Website: www.akerfloatingproduction.com/

Aker Floating Production (OSE: AKFP) was a Norwegian Floating Production Storage and Offloading vessel operator and part of the Aker Group, with Aker ASA owning 44.27% of the company. It was listed on Oslo Stock Exchange.

The company was founded 14 March 2006, and listed on 26 June 2006. It has purchased three oil tankers for conversion to FPSO vessels, and the first vessel was delivered in the third quarter of 2007. The company plans to have four FPSOs in operation by 2009. First commercial contract for operation was on the Indian oil field Dhirubhai 1.
