= Aker BP =

Norwegian oil exploration and development company

Aker BP ASA
- Company type: Allmennaksjeselskap
- Traded as: Oslo Stock Exchange: AKRBP
- Industry: Oil and gas
- Predecessor: Pertra ASA; DNO; Aker Exploration; Marathon Oil Norway; BP Norge
- Founded: 2016
- Headquarters: Fornebu, Norway
- Key people: Karl Johnny Hersvik (CEO)
- Products: Petroleum
- Revenue: ▼US$10.9 billion (2025)
- Operating income: ▼US$6.8 billion (2025)
- Total assets: ▲US$44.8 billion (2025)
- Total equity: ▲US$11.6 billion (2025)
- Owner: Aker ASA (40%), BP (30%)
- Number of employees: 3,108
- Website: www.akerbp.com/en/

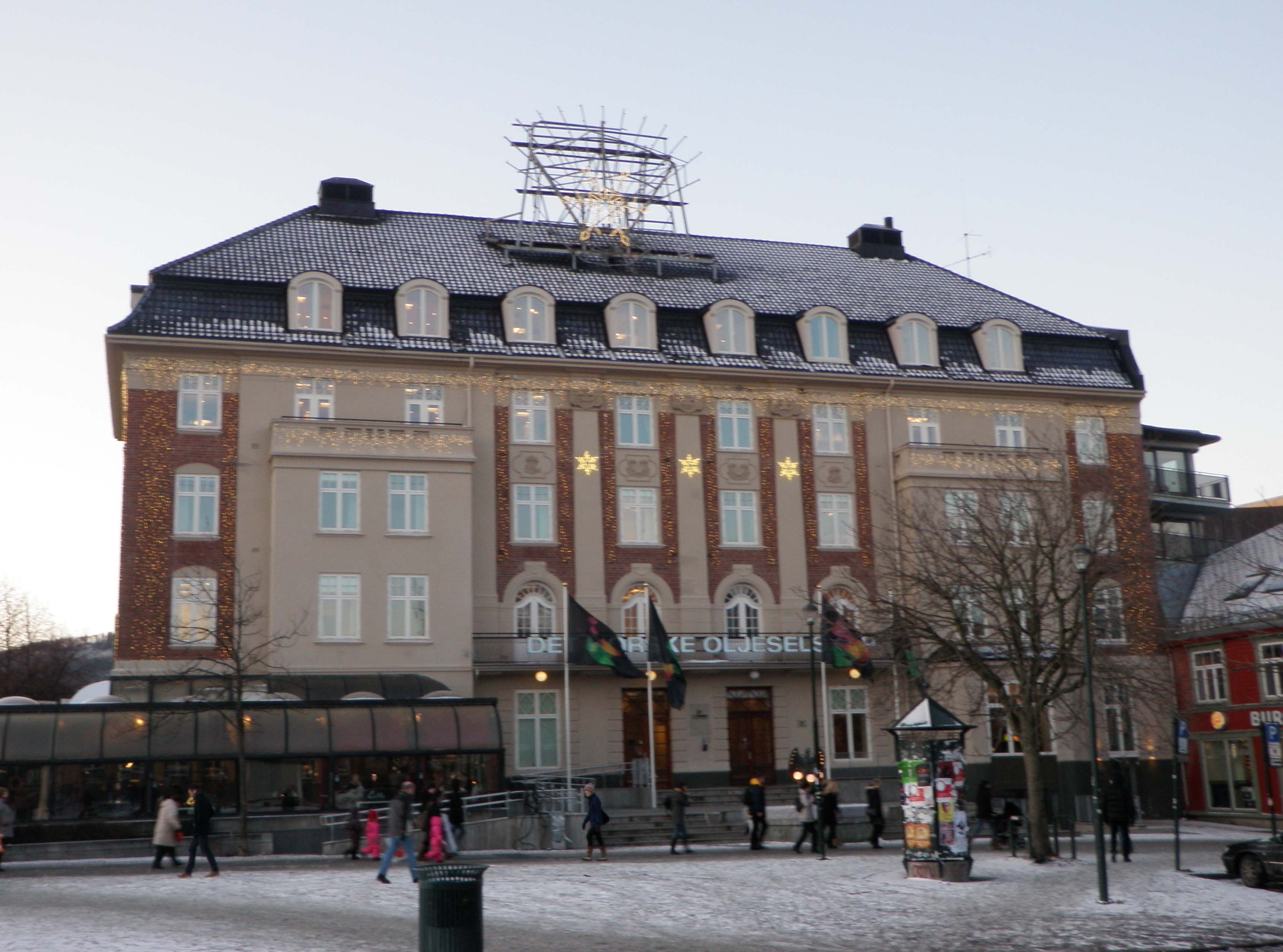
Aker BP ASA headquarters in Trondheim

Aker BP ASA is a Norwegian oil exploration and development company focusing on petroleum resources on the Norwegian Continental Shelf. It is present all over Norway. The headquarters are in Fornebu with additional offices in Trondheim, Stavanger and Harstad. The company employs a staff of more than 2,400.

== History ==
Det Norske Oljeselskap (now DNO International) was founded in 1971. Pertra was created when the oil exploration and production division of Petroleum Geo-Services was demerged in 2001.

In 2007, the new Det Norske Oljeselskap was created by merger of a Norwegian oil company Pertra and the Norwegian interests of DNO. In 2009, a Norwegian oil company Aker Exploration merged with Det Norske Oljeselskap. On May 21, 2013, the company announced it had produced its first oil as an operator from the Jette field in the Norwegian sector of the North Sea.

In 2014, Det Norske Oljeselskap bought Marathon Oil's Norwegian subsidiary Marathon Oil Norway for US$2.7 billion. The sale included the Alvheim floating production vessel and 10 active licenses on the Norwegian continental shelf in the North Sea.

In 2016, Det Norske Oljeselskap purchased BP subsidiary BP Norge for US$140 million in cash and US$1.3 billion in stock. The deal left Aker ASA, the industrial investment company controlled by Kjell Inge Røkke, with 40 percent of the merged company's stock, BP with 30 percent, and other public shareholders with the remaining 30 percent. The merger created Norway's largest independent petroleum producer (by volume).

Swedish petroleum company Lundin Energy was purchased by Aker BP in July 2022 in a deal worth more than US$14 billion.
