= Western World (disambiguation) =

The Western world is a term referring to different nations depending on the context.

Western World may also refer to:

- Greco-Roman world, regions and countries that were culturally influenced by the ancient Greeks and Romans
- Western Bloc, countries allied with the NATO during the Cold War

== Ships ==
- Western World (British ship), a British sailing ship in the mid 1800s
- USS Western World (1856), a ship acquired by the Union Navy during the American Civil War

== Other uses ==
- Western World (newspaper), former name of Warsaw Signal, United States newspaper published during the mid 1800s
- "The Western World", a 2008 music single by Pennywise
- Western World Insurance Group, a United States insurance provider
- Robert's Western World, a honky tonk located in Nashville Tennessee, United States

== See also ==
- Western Christianity, Latin Church of the Catholic Church and those denominations historically derived from it
- Westworld (disambiguation)
- Western culture (disambiguation)
- Western values (disambiguation)
