= List of shipwrecks in October 1853 =

List of shipwrecks that happened in October 1853

The list of shipwrecks in October 1853 includes ships sunk, foundered, wrecked, grounded, or otherwise lost during October 1853.

== 1 October ==
List of shipwrecks: 1 October 1853
Ship	State	Description
Alicia	United Kingdom	The barque was wrecked on a reef in the Magdalen Islands, Nova Scotia, British North America. Her crew were rescued. She was on a voyage from Quebec City, Province of Canada, British North America to Plymouth, Devon.
Anne Marie	United Kingdom	The ship was driven ashore and wrecked on "Madam Island", Nova Scotia, British North America. She was on a voyage from Quebec City to Liverpool, Lancashire.
Graf von Paris	Russia	The ship was wrecked on a reef off Saaremaa. She was on a voyage from Liverpool, Lancashire, United Kingdom to Saint Petersburg.
Orkney Lass	United Kingdom	The ship ran aground on a reef off Honolulu, Hawaiian Islands and was severely damaged. She was refloated.
Williams	United Kingdom	The schooner was driven ashore at Magilligan Point, County Londonderry. She was refloated on 3 October and taken in to Greencastle, County Donegal.

== 2 October ==
List of shipwrecks: 2 October 1853
Ship	State	Description
Catalina	Spain	The ship was driven ashore west of Folkestone, Kent, United Kingdom. She was on a voyage from Havana, Cuba to Antwerp, Belgium. She was refloated and taken in to Folkestone.
City of Manchester	United Kingdom	The steamship ran aground at Liverpool, Lancashire. She was on a voyage from Philadelphia, Pennsylvania, United States. She was refloated and taken in to Liverpool.
Commerce	United Kingdom	The ship ran aground on the Whiting Sand, in the North Sea. She was on a voyage from King's Lynn, Norfolk to Goole, Yorkshire. She was refloated and put back to King's Lynn in a leaky condition.
Emilie	Netherlands	The ship was driven ashore in Half Moon Bay, Van Diemen's Land.
Haggis	United Kingdom	The Barking smack foundered in the North Sea. Her crew were rescued.
Margaret and Mary	United Kingdom	The ship struck a reef and foundered off Eyemouth, Berwickshire.
Ocar	Grand Duchy of Mecklenburg-Schwerin	The brig was driven ashore and wrecked at Domesnes, Russia. Her crew were rescued. She was on a voyage from Bolderāja, Russia to Helsingør, Denmark.
Thomas and Susannah	United Kingdom	The ship ran aground on the Ferry Sand, in the North Sea and sank. Her crew were rescued. She was on a voyage from Hartlepool, County Durham to Hunstanton, Norfolk. The wreck subsequently came ashore on the Norfolk coast.
Trofastheden	Norway	The sloop sank in the Dogger Bank. Her crew were rescued. She was on a voyage from London, United Kingdom to Faaberg.
10 Juni	Stettin	The ship ran aground off Læsø, Denmark and was damaged. She was on a voyage from Stettin to London, United Kingdom. She was refloated and resumed her voyage as far as the Cattegat then put back to Helsingør, Denmark in a leaky condition.

== 3 October ==
List of shipwrecks: 3 October 1853
Ship	State	Description
Calder	United Kingdom	The ship was driven ashore at Kronstadt, Russia. Her crew were rescued. She was on a voyage from Leith, Lothian to Kronstadt.
Kingston-by-Sea	United Kingdom	The brig was run into and sunk in the English Channel 9 nautical miles (17 km) off Hastings, Sussex with the loss of a crew member. Survivors were rescued by Agenoria (United Kingdom). Kingston-by-Sea was on a voyage from Hartlepool, County Durham to Shoreham-by-Sea, Sussex.
Nancy	United Kingdom	The ship was beached at Stornoway, Outer Hebrides. She was on a voyage from Sherbrooke, Nova Scotia, British North America to Lossiemouth, Morayshire.
Thetis	United Kingdom	The ship was driven ashore and wrecked at "Dolgoiness", Russia. Her crew were rescued.
Tino	United Kingdom	The schooner sprang a leak and sank between the Shipwash Sand and the Longsand, in the North Sea off the coast of Essex. Her crew were rescued by Seagull (United Kingdom). Tino was on a voyage from South Shields, County Durham to Dieppe, Seine-Inférieure, France.
Vine	United Kingdom	The ship was driven ashore and wrecked at Narva, Russia. Her crew were rescued. She was on a voyage from Dundee, Forfarshire to Narva.

== 4 October ==
List of shipwrecks: 4 October 1853
Ship	State	Description
Blakeney and Hull Trader	United Kingdom	The sloop foundered in the North Sea with the loss of all hands.
Charlotte	United Kingdom	The smack collided with the schooner Jane (United Kingdom) and sank in the River Colne.
Cheviot	United Kingdom	The ship struck the Geysard Rock, in the Farne Islands, Northumberland and was consequently beached at Ross, Northumberland. She was on a voyage from Sunderland, County Durham to Aberdeen. She was refloated on 17 October and towed in to Berwick upon Tweed, Northumberland for repairs.
Conway	United Kingdom	The steamship ran aground on a reef off Belle Isle and was severely damaged. She was refloated and taken in to Basseterre, Saint Kitts.
Corsair's Bride	United Kingdom	The ship was driven ashore at Dungeness, Kent. She was on a voyage from London to Ceylon. She was refloated and taken in to Dover, Kent.
Despatch	United Kingdom	The ship was driven ashore near Abererch, Caernarfonshire. She was on a voyage from the Isle of Man to Pwllheli, Caernarfonshire.
Duen	Norway	The sloop was wrecked on South Uist, Outer Hebrides, United Kingdom.
Guardian	United Kingdom	The ship foundered in the North Sea off the Dutch coast with the loss of all hands. She was on a voyage from Bahia, Empire of Brazil to Amsterdam, North Holland, Netherlands. A message in a bottle stating that she was sinking washed up on the Dutch coast.
Harewood	United Kingdom	The collier, a brig, was in collision with Trident (United Kingdom) and sank in the Thames Estuary with the loss of six of her eight crew. She was on a voyage from Cardiff, Glamorgan to London.
Jane and Ann	United Kingdom	The ship was driven ashore at Nevlunghavn, Norway. She was on a voyage from Danzig to London. She was refloated on 17 November and resumed her voyage.
John Weavell	United Kingdom	The schooner was wrecked near Hastings, Sussex. Her crew survived.
Laure	France	The ship was driven ashore on Læsø, Denmark. She was on a voyage from Riga, Russia to Dunkirk, Nord. She had been refloated by 10 October and taken in to Fredrikshavn, Denmark.
Matilda Wattenbach	United Kingdom	The full-rigged ship ran aground on being launched at Jersey, Channel Islands. She was refloated.
Leonine	United States	The ship was driven ashore on Eierland, North Holland. She was on a voyage from Matanzas, Cuba to Saint Petersburg, Russia.
Nederland	Netherlands	The ship was driven ashore in the Vlie. She was on a voyage from Cardiff, Glamorgan, United Kingdom to Leer, Kingdom of Hanover.
Swift	United Kingdom	The schooner was abandoned off Cromer, Norfolk. Her crew were rescued.
Two Sisters	United Kingdom	The sloop foundered in the North Sea with the loss of all hands.

== 5 October ==
List of shipwrecks: 5 October 1853
Ship	State	Description
Admiral Drake	United Kingdom	The ship was abandoned at sea. Her crew were rescued. She was on a voyage from Hartlepool, County Durham to Gothenburg, Sweden.
Aurora	(United Kingdom of Great Britain and Ireland) Jersey	The ship ran aground at Ramsgate, Kent. She was on a voyage from South Shields, County Durham to Jersey. She was refloated and take in to Ramsgate.
Charles Tucker	United Kingdom	The ship ran aground on The Platters, off the coast of Anglesey and was damaged. She was on a voyage from Barrow in Furness, Lancashire to Port Talbot, Glamorgan. She was refloated and taken in to Holyhead, Anglesey.
Dauphin	France	The ship foundered at Dungeness, Kent, United Kingdom. Her crew were rescued.
Hope	United Kingdom	The sloop collided with a steamship and was abandoned in the Irish Sea 4 nautical miles (7.4 km) off Anglesey. Her crew were rescued by the steamship.
Little Bray	United Kingdom	The ship was abandoned in the Irish Sea off the Calf of Man, Isle of Man. Her crew were rescued by Montezuma (United Kingdom). Little Bray was on a voyage from Derby Haven, Isle of Man to Swansea, Glamorgan.
Neman (Неман)	Imperial Russian Navy	The transport ship, a brig, was driven ashore and wrecked in the skerries near sv:Böttö, off Gothenburg, Sweden. Her 80 crew were rescued and taken to sv:Känsö. She was on a voyage from Kronstadt to Petropavlovsk.
Santipore	United Kingdom	The barque was driven ashore and wrecked at Folkestone, Kent. She was on a voyage from London to Sydney, New South Wales and Hobart, Van Diemen's Land. She was later refloated with the assistance of the luggers Four Brothers, William and Mary, the galley Ned and the steamship Princess Mary (all United Kingdom).
Urbanus	Sweden	The schooner was wrecked near Umeå. Her crew were rescued.
Unnamed	Denmark	The three-masted 1,200-tonne ship was wrecked in the Kattegat on a reef south of Læsø.
22 unnamed vessels	Flag unknown	The ships were wrecked in the Kattegat.

== 6 October ==
List of shipwrecks: 6 October 1853
Ship	State	Description
Adelaide	United Kingdom	The smack was run into by the steamship Victoria (United Kingdom) and sank at Monkstown, County Cork. Her crew were rescued. She was on a voyage from Youghal to Cork.
Adonis	Norway	The ship was wrecked at Thisted, Denmark. Her crew were rescued. She was on a voyage from London, United Kingdom to Dram.
Ann	United Kingdom	The sloop was driven ashore at Staithes, Yorkshire. She was refloated and taken in to Staithes.
Calcutta	Denmark	The ship ran aground on the Copper Ground, in the Baltic Sea. She was on a voyage from Apenrade to London. She was refloated on 10 October with assistance from the steamship Herta (Denmark) but consequently sank.
Haitienne	Hamburg	The ship ran aground on the Noorder Haaks Bank, in the North Sea. She was on a voyage from Saint Domingo to Hamburg.
Herbert	United Kingdom	The ship was wrecked at Klitmoller, Denmark. Her crew were rescued. She was on a voyage from London to Memel, Prussia.

== 7 October ==
List of shipwrecks: 7 October 1853
Ship	State	Description
Chanticleer	United Kingdom	The ship was driven ashore at "Eitzenloch". Her passengers were landed. She was on a voyage from Newcastle upon Tyne, Northumberland to Hamburg.
Cupid	United Kingdom	The abandoned ship was driven ashore near Ringkøbing, Denmark.
Northumberland	United Kingdom	The collier ran aground on the Dotwick Sand, in the North Sea off the coast of County Durham.
Victoria	United Kingdom	The ship capsized at Dartmouth, Devon. She was on a voyage from London to Marseille, Bouches-du-Rhône, France. She was righted.
William	United Kingdom	The ship was driven ashore at Wainfleet, Lincolnshire. She was on a voyage from Great Yarmouth, Norfolk to Sunderland, County Durham.

== 8 October ==
List of shipwrecks: 8 October 1853
Ship	State	Description
Caesar	Royal Navy	The second rate ran aground on the Dean Sand, in the Solent. She was refloated and anchored at Spithead.
Evergreen	United Kingdom	The barque was driven ashore at Milne Point, New Brunswick, British North America.
Royal Victoria	United Kingdom	The ship ran aground at Granton, Lothian. She was on a voyage from Granton to London. She was refloated the next day.
Stormfuglen	Norway	The ship was in collision with Antoinette ( Stettin) and sank off Anholt, Denmark and sank. Her crew were rescued by Antoinette. Stormfuglen was on a voyage from Stavanger to a Baltic port.

== 9 October ==
List of shipwrecks: 9 October 1853
Ship	State	Description
Amor	Kingdom of Hanover	The ship was driven ashore and severely damaged at Tranum, Denmark. She was on a voyage from London, United Kingdom to Riga, Russia.
Dynameme	United Kingdom	The ship was driven ashore on Öland, Sweden. She was on a voyage from Riga to Torquay, Devon. She was refloated and resumed her voyage in a leaky condition.
Euphemia	United Kingdom	The ship ran aground on the Bar Sand, in The Wash, capsized and was abandoned. She was on a voyage from Danzig to Boston, Lincolnshire. She was righted and towed in to Sutton Bridge, Lincolnshire in a waterlogged condition.
Margaret	United Kingdom	The sloop was wrecked on the Chapel Rocks, off Bude, Cornwall. Her crew were rescued by the Bude Lifeboat.
Neptunus	United Kingdom	The ship foundered in the English Channel 6 nautical miles (11 km) south of Portland, Dorset. Her crew were rescued. She was on a voyage from Cardiff, Glamorgan to Leer, Kingdom of Hanover.
Syren	United Kingdom	The schooner was wrecked on the Arklow Bank, in the Irish Sea off the coast of County Wicklow. Her crew were rescued. She was on a voyage from Pembrey, Carmarthenshire to Dublin.

== 10 October ==
List of shipwrecks: 10 October 1853
Ship	State	Description
Anjer	Netherlands	The East Indiaman struck a floating wreck in the North Sea 8 nautical miles (15 km) east south east of the Galloper Lightship ( Trinity House) and was damaged. She was on a voyage from Amsterdam, North Holland to Batavia, Netherlands East Indies. She consequently put in to Sheerness, Kent, United Kingdom.
Ann	United Kingdom	The brig was driven ashore at Spurn Point, Yorkshire. She was on a voyage from Kronstadt, Russia to Hull, Yorkshire. She was refloated on 17 October and taken in to Grimsby, Lincolnshire in a waterlogged condition.
Gottfreid Auguste	Flag unknown	The ship was in collision with the steamship Natal (United Kingdom) and was driven ashore on the Goereesche Wand. She was on a voyage from "Hergen" to Antwerp, Belgium. She was declared a total loss.
Hanne	Denmark	The ship sank 8 nautical miles (15 km) off Skagen. Her crew were rescued. She was on a voyage from Randers to Inverkeithing, Fife, United Kingdom.
Isabella	United Kingdom	The ship ran aground near Höganäs, Sweden. She was on a voyage from Wick, Caithness to Stettin. She was refloated and resumed her voyage.
Johanna	United Kingdom	The ship foundered in the Baltic Sea with the loss of all but one of her crew. She was on a voyage from London to a Baltic port.
Marchioness	United Kingdom	The ship was driven ashore at the Melbourne Heads, Victoria. She was on a voyage from Cape Town, Cape Colony to Melbourne.
Pride	United Kingdom	The ship was driven ashore at Harboøre, Denmark.
William and Jane	United Kingdom	The brig foundered in the Atlantic Ocean. Her crew were rescued by a Norwegian brig. She was on a voyage from Galaţi, Ottoman Empire to Falmouth, Cornwall.

== 11 October ==
List of shipwrecks: 11 October 1853
Ship	State	Description
Antonio Vincent	Lübeck	The ship was abandoned in the Atlantic Ocean. Her crew survived. She was on a voyage from Charleston, South Carolina, United States to Saint John, New Brunswick, British North America.
Calcutta	United Kingdom	The ship sprang a leak and was beached on Læsø, Denmark. She was on a voyage from Apenrade, Norway to London. She was refloated on 16 October but sank. She was consequently declared a total loss.
Eclipse	United States	The extreme clipper was driven ashore at Ypala, Mexico. She broke in two and was a total loss.
Henderika Annechina de Boa	Netherlands	The ship was abandoned in the North Sea. Her crew were rescued. She was on a voyage from Danzig to Amsterdam, North Holland.
Joven Luis	Spain	The brig ran aground on the Goodwin Sands, Kent, United Kingdom. She was on a voyage from Antwerp, Belgium to Havana, Cuba. She was refloated and put in to Havre de Grâce, Seine-Inférieure, France in a leaky condition. She arrived on 14 October and was placed under repair.
Pernambucana	Brazil	The steamship was wrecked near "St. Katherine's" with the loss of more than 40 lives.
Philanstere	France	The brig was severely damaged by fire at Cayenne. She was consequently condemned.
Sertum	(United Kingdom of Great Britain and Ireland) Guernsey	The ship ran aground and was wrecked on the Copper Ground, off Læsø, Denmark. Her crew were rescued. She was on a voyage from Danzig to Guernsey.
Shamrock	United Kingdom	The paddle steamer ran aground in the Clyde. She was on a voyage from Sligo to Glasgow, Renfrewshire. She was refloated.
Storfersten	Prussia	The ship was driven ashore at Borgholm, Sweden. She was on a voyage from Luleå, Sweden to Lübeck.

== 12 October ==
List of shipwrecks: 12 October 1853
Ship	State	Description
Annegina	Russia	The ship ran aground at the mouth of the Uggerby Å. She was on a voyage from Riga to London, United Kingdom.
Chance	United Kingdom	The ship was driven ashore and wrecked at Porto, Portugal. Her crew were rescued. She was on a voyage from Galaţi, Ottoman Empire to Queenstown, County Cork.
Chapman	United Kingdom	The barque foundered in the Atlantic Ocean 480 nautical miles (890 km) west south west of the Isles of Scilly. Her crew were rescued. She was on a voyage from Sierra Leone to Plymouth, Devon.
Elizabeth	Norway	The schooner was wrecked on the Abertay Sands, off the coast of Forfarshire, United Kingdom. Her crew were rescued by the Broughty Ferry Lifeboat. She was on a voyage from Dram to Dundee, Forfarshire.
Lemnos	United Kingdom	The brig was wrecked on the Cheilkground, in the Gulf of Finland. Her crew were rescued by Atwick (United Kingdom). Lemnos was on a voyage from Saint Petersburg, Russia to London.

== 13 October ==
List of shipwrecks: 13 October 1853
Ship	State	Description
Fame	United Kingdom	The ship ran aground at Teignmouth, Devon. She was on a voyage from Newcastle upon Tyne, Northumberland to Teignmouth. She was refloated and taken in to Teignmouth.
Norge	Norway	The schooner ran aground on the Goodwin Sands, Kent, United Kingdom. She was on a voyage from Drammen to Plymouth, Devon, United Kingdom. She was refloated and taken in to The Downs.
Perseverance	United Kingdom	The ship ran aground at Waterford. She was on a voyage from Waterford to the Cape of Good Hope, Cape Colony. She was refloated and resumed her voyage.

== 14 October ==
List of shipwrecks: 14 October 1853
Ship	State	Description
Emma	United Kingdom	The ship sank at Plymouth, Devon. She was on a voyage from Swansea, Glamorgan to Portsmouth, Hampshire.
Flora	United Kingdom	The ship was driven ashore and wrecked near Ålesund, Norway. Her crew were rescued. She was on a voyage from Arkhangelsk, Russia to London.

== 15 October ==
List of shipwrecks: 15 October 1853
Ship	State	Description
Mathilde	Bremen	The ship ran aground near Weddewarden. She was on a voyage from New York to Bremen. She was refloated the next day.

== 16 October ==
List of shipwrecks: 16 October 1853
Ship	State	Description
Conheath	United Kingdom	The ship caught fire in Table Bay and burnt until 22 September. She was on a voyage from Liverpool, Lancashire to Table Bay.

== 17 October ==
List of shipwrecks: 17 October 1853
Ship	State	Description
Anne Johanna	Sweden	The ship was wrecked off Sandhammaren. She was on a voyage from Stockholm to Copenhagen, Denmark.
Bustruy	Prussia	The ship ran aground and was damaged at Liebau. She was on a voyage from Liebau to Dundee, Forfarshire, United Kingdom. She was refloated and put back to Liebau.
Caroline Frances	United Kingdom	The ship was run into by the brig Friends (United Kingdom) and sank off Caister-by-Sea, Norfolk. Her crew were rescued by James and Elizabeth (United Kingdom). Caroline Frances was on a voyage from sunderland, County Durham to London.
Cyrus	United Kingdom	The brig ran aground on the Scroby Sands, Norfolk. She was on a voyage from Middlesbrough, Yorkshire to London. She was refloated and taken in to Great Yarmouth, Norfolk.
Forth	United Kingdom	The ship was wrecked near Marsala, Sicily. She was on a voyage from the Black Sea to Falmouth, Cornwall or Queenstown, County Cork.
Isabella	United Kingdom	The ship was driven ashore and wrecked at Cairnbulg Head, Aberdeenshire.
Will o' the Wisp	(United Kingdom of Great Britain and Ireland) Victoria	The ship was wrecked at Swan's Point, Port Phillip Heads. She was on a voyage from New Zealand to Melbourne.
Yenikale (Еникале)	Imperial Russian Navy	The steamship ran aground at ru:Cape Kikineiz, Southern Coast of Crimea, and was subsequently beached at Alupka. All on board were rescued. She was on a voyage from Sevastopol to Yalta. Yenikale broke up on 29 October.

== 18 October ==
List of shipwrecks: 18 October 1853
Ship	State	Description
Active	United Kingdom	The ship was driven ashore at the Mumbles, Glamorgan. She was refloated on 1 November.
Albion	United Kingdom	The ship was wrecked at the Mumbles.
Ann	United Kingdom	The ship was driven ashore at the Mumbles. She was refloated on 1 November.
Castle Quincy	United Kingdom	The ship sank at the Mumbles.
Elizabeth	United Kingdom	The ship was driven ashore at the Mumbles.
Iris	Norway	The schooner was driven ashore at Ramsgate, Kent, United Kingdom. She was on a voyage from Sarpsborg to Honfleur, Manche, France. She was refloated and taken in to Ramsgate.
Mary Bayley	United Kingdom	The ship was driven ashore east of Gibraltar. She was on a voyage from Galaţi, Ottoman Empire to Queenstown, County Cork. She was refloated that day, and resumed her voyage on 20 October.
Merlin	United Kingdom	The steamship was in collision with the steamship Eclipse (United Kingdom) and sank in the Clyde. Her crew survived.
Olivia	United Kingdom	The fishing lugger was driven ashore and wrecked at Penzance, Cornwall. Her crew were rescued.
Splendid	United Kingdom	The schooner was wrecked on the Newcombe Sand, in the North Sea off the coast of Suffolk. Her crew were rescued. She was on a voyage from Caernarfon to Hull, Yorkshire.
Wasp	United Kingdom	The ship was driven ashore and wrecked near "Chefcora", Spain. Her crew were rescued. She was on a voyage from Cardiff, Glamorgan to Cádiz, Spain.

== 19 October ==
List of shipwrecks: 19 October 1853
Ship	State	Description
Annegina	Netherlands	The ship was driven ashore and wrecked at the mouth of the Uggerby Å. Her crew were rescued. She was on a voyage from Riga, Russia to London, United Kingdom.
Arcole	United Kingdom	The ship was wrecked. She was on a voyage from Baltimore, Maryland, United States to Liverpool, Lancashire.
Champion	United Kingdom	The ship was driven ashore and wrecked at Guernsey, Channel Islands. Her crew were rescued. She was on a voyage from Mevagissey, Cornwall to Jersey, Channel Islands.
Dalhousie	United Kingdom	The full-rigged ship foundered in the English Channel 16 nautical miles (30 km) west by south west of Beachy Head, Sussex with the loss of 58 of the 59 people on board. The survivor was rescued by the brig Mitchell Grove (United Kingdom). Dalhousie was on a voyage from Blackwall, Middlesex to Sydney, New South Wales.
Germaine	France	The ship was driven ashore at Le Croisic, Loire-Inférieure. She was on a voyage from Martinique to Bordeaux, Gironde. She had been refloated and completed her voyage by 22 October.
Marshall	Hamburg	The steamship ran aground at the mouth of the Elbe. She was on a voyage from Hamburg to Hull, Yorkshire, United Kingdom. She was refloated and taken in to Neuwerk.
Mary Adams	United States	The barque was destroyed by fire off Mindoro Island, Spanish East Indies. Her crew were rescued. She was on a voyage from Paget's Sound to Singapore, Straits Settlements.
Matilda	Kingdom of the Two Sicilies	The ship ran aground on the Whitaker Sand, in the North Sea off the coast of Essex, United Kingdom. She was on a voyage from South Shields, County Durham, United Kingdom to Naples. She was refloated and taken in to Wivenhoe, Essex.
Neptunus	Norway	The ship ran aground on the Whitaker Sand. She was on a voyage from Hernosand to London, United Kingdom. She was refloated and taken in to Wivenhoe.
Ocean	United Kingdom	The ship was beached at Harwich, Essex.
Oracle	United Kingdom	The ship ran aground at Scarborough, Yorkshire. She was refloated and taken in to Scarborough in a leaky condition.
Speculation	United Kingdom	The ship ran aground on the Buxey Sand, in the North Sea off the coast of Suffolk. She was refloated and taken in to Wivenhoe in a leaky condition.
Swan	United Kingdom	The ship ran aground on the Brake Sand, in the North Sea off the coast of Kent. She was on a voyage from Sunderland, County Durham to Havre de Grâce, Seine-Inférieure, France. She was refloated and taken in to Ramsgate, Kent in a leaky condition.
Vanguard	United Kingdom	The brig ran aground on the Whitaker Sand. She was refloated but was consequently beached on the coast of Essex.

== 20 October ==
List of shipwrecks: 20 October 1853
Ship	State	Description
Caroline	United Kingdom	The smack struck the Villars Rocks, off the coast of Cornwall and sank. She was refloated on 12 November and taken in to Padstow, Cornwall.
Ellen	(United Kingdom of Great Britain and Ireland) Jersey	The cutter struck the Grune Rock, off Sark, Channel Islands and foundered. Her crew were rescued.
John Parry	United Kingdom	The ship was abandoned in the Atlantic Ocean. Seven crew were rescued by Mary (United Kingdom). John Parry was on a voyage from Cardiff, Glamorgan to Malta.
Providence	United Kingdom	The ship was abandoned off Milford Haven, Pembrokeshire. She was on a voyage from Neath, Glamorgan to Hayle, Cornwall.
Rose Ellis	United Kingdom	The ship ran aground on the Dean Sand, in the Solent. She was refloated on 27 October and sailed for Cowes, Isle of Wight.
William and Mary	United Kingdom	The flat was driven ashore and sank on the Goodwick Sands, Pembrokeshire. She was on a voyage from Liverpool to Bristol, Gloucestershire. William and Mary was refloated on 28 October and taken in to Fishguard, Pembrokeshire.
William Carson	United Kingdom	The ship ran aground on the Muscle Sharp, in the North Sea off the coast of County Durham.

== 21 October ==
List of shipwrecks: 21 October 1853
Ship	State	Description
Elise	Sweden	The ship was driven ashore and wrecked 2 nautical miles (3.7 km) south of Collieston, Aberdeenshire, United Kingdom with the loss of a crew member. She was on a voyage from Liverpool, Lancashire, United Kingdom to Helsingør, Denmark.
Elizabeth	United Kingdom	The ship ran aground on the Roar Spit. She was on a voyage from Blyth, Northumberland to Havre de Grâce, Seine-Maritime. She was refloated and put in to Ramsgate, Kent in a leaky condition.
Pursuit	United Kingdom	The ship ran aground at the Mumbles, Glamorgan. She was refloated on 25 October.
Sarah	United Kingdom	The ship was driven ashore and wrecked at Kirkcudbright. Her crew were rescued. She was on a voyage from Whitehaven, Cumberland to Port William, Wigtownshire.
Two Brothers	United Kingdom	The ship was driven ashore at Portland, Dorset. Her crew were rescued. She was on a voyage from Plymouth, Devon to Quebec City, Province of Canada, British North America.
William and Mary	United Kingdom	The ship ran aground and sank on the Codwick Sand, in the Bristol Channel off the coast of Pembrokeshire. She was on a voyage from Liverpool to Bristol, Gloucestershire. She was refloated on 28 October and taken in to Fishguard, Pembrokeshire.

== 22 October ==
List of shipwrecks: 22 October 1853
Ship	State	Description
Augusta	United Kingdom	The ship was wrecked on the Skerry Rocks, off Lossiemouth, Inverness-shire. Her crew were rescued. She was on a voyage from Sunderland, County Durham to Inverness.
Emma Heyn	Danzig	The ship was driven ashore at Gilleleje, Denmark. She was on a voyage from Liverpool, Lancashire, United Kingdom to Danzig. She was refloated the next day.
Exile	United Kingdom	The ship sprang a leak and was run ashore at "Patrick's Bridge", County Wexford. She was on a voyage from Port Talbot, Glamorgan to Cork.
Fanny	United Kingdom	The crewless fishing smack was driven ashore in Moville Bay and severely damaged.
Hamilton Ross	United Kingdom	The ship was driven ashore and wrecked at Arkhangelsk, Russia. She was on a voyage from Arkhangelsk to Stockton-on-Tees, County Durham.
Harward	United Kingdom	The ship was wrecked on the Wachaprique Shoals. Her crew were rescued. She was on a voyage from Newport, Monmouthshire to Norfolk, Virginia.
Letitia	United Kingdom	The barque was driven ashore at Martin's Reef, Florida, United States. She was on a voyage from British Honduras to Cowes, Isle of Wight. She was refloated on 24 October, and resumed her voyage on 2 November.
Lucie	France	The schooner was driven ashore and wrecked at Covehithe, Suffolk, United Kingdom with the loss of all hands.
Marguerite	France	The ship ran aground on the Pointe-au-Canoniers Reef, off Mauritius. She was on a voyage from Coringa, India to Marseille, Bouches-du-Rhône.
Randolph	(United Kingdom of Great Britain and Ireland) Victoria	The barque was wrecked off New Zealand's Chatham Islands. All hands were saved.
Rapid	United Kingdom	The ship sank off Cape Henry, Virginia, United States. She was on a voyage from Alexandria, Virginia to Cork.
Robert	United Kingdom	The sloop ran aground on the Annat Sands. She was on a voyage from Montrose, Forfarshire to Newcastle upon Tyne, Northumberland. She was refloated on 5 November and towed in to Montrose.
Tartar	United Kingdom	The ship was in collision with the steamship Gazelle (United Kingdom) and sank off the Spurn Lighthouse, Yorkshire. Her crew were rescued.
Warren	United Kingdom	The ship sank off Beadnell Point, Northumberland. Her crew were rescued. She was on a voyage from Newcastle upon Tyne to Leith, Lothian.
Western World	United Kingdom	During a voyage from Liverpool, England, to New York City, United States, carrying 300 passengers, the sailing ship ran aground in thick fog off Spring Lake, New Jersey. All on board, more than 600 people, were rescued. Her wreck broke up and sank 25 feet (8 m) of water on 26 October and became known as the "Spring Lake Wreck." She broke up on 13 November.
Zion	United Kingdom	The ship was driven ashore and sank near Tranquebar, India. She was on a voyage from Coringa, India to London.

== 23 October ==
List of shipwrecks: 23 October 1853
Ship	State	Description
Acorn	United Kingdom	The ship sprang a leak and was beached in Broad Bay, Isle of Lewis.
Ajax	United States	The tug departed from New York for Boston, Massachusetts. Presumed foundered with the loss of all hands; wreckage from the ship was sighted off Cape Cod, Massachusetts by the barque Marmion (United Kingdom).
Dauntless	United States	The extreme clipper departed from Boston, Massachusetts for Valparaíso, Chile. No further trace, presumed foundered with the loss of all hands.
Eleanor	United Kingdom	The ship was driven ashore at Fleetwood, Lancashire. She was on a voyage from Troon, Ayrshire to Runcorn, Cheshire.
Hazlewood	United Kingdom	The ship was driven ashore 5 nautical miles (9.3 km) north of Ramsey, Isle of Man, She was on a voyage from Wick, Caithness to Liverpool, Lancashire.
Margaretha	United Kingdom	The ship struck St. Patrick's Causeway and was abandoned by her crew. She was subsequently driven ashore and wrecked near Pencilland Head, Caernarfonshire. She was on a voyage from Troon to Malta.
Nouveau Faisceau	France	The ship sank at Calais. She was on a voyage from Cherbourg, Seine-Inférieure to Seaham, County Durham, United Kingdom. She was refloated on 3 November.
Petronella	Sweden	The ship was driven ashore near Hablingbo. She was on a voyage from Stockholm to London, United Kingdom.

== 24 October ==
List of shipwrecks: 24 October 1853
Ship	State	Description
Anna	Prussia	The ship was driven ashore on Saaremaa, Russia. Her crew were rescued. She was on a voyage from Rouen, Seine-Inférieure, France to Saint Petersburg, Russia.
Catherine Mitchell	United Kingdom	The ship ran aground on the Armoghen Shoal, off the coast of India.
Cobequid	United States	The ship departed from Liverpool, Lancashire, United Kingdom for a port in Virginia. Subsequently foundered; wreckage from the ship washed up in Macrihanish Bay in mid-November.
Gipsy	United Kingdom	The ship departed from Saint John', Newfoundland, British North America for Greenock, Renfrewshire. No further trace, presumed foundered with the loss of all hands.
Juno	Spain	The steamship was wrecked at the mouth of the Manning River with the loss of seven lives. She was on a voyage from Sydney, New South Wales to Manila, Spanish East Indies.
License	Rostock	The ship was driven ashore on Hirtsholmene. She was on a voyage from Sunderland, County Durham, United Kingdom to Rostock. She was refloated on 28 October.
Sillery	United Kingdom	The ship was driven ashore near Barmouth, Merionethshire. She was on a voyage from Quebec City, Province of Canada, British North America to Liverpool. She was refloated on 13 April 1854 and taken in tow for Liverpool.
Urgent	United Kingdom	The ship departed from Liverpool for the Cape Verde Islands. No further trace, presumed foundered with the loss of all hands.
William Sturgiss	United Kingdom	The ship was driven ashore at Quoddy Head, Nova Scotia, British North America. She was on a voyage from Saint John, New Brunswick to Liverpool. She was later refloated and towed in to Portland, Maine, United States, where she arrived on 5 November.

== 25 October ==
List of shipwrecks: 25 October 1853
Ship	State	Description
Canada	United Kingdom	The ship was driven ashore at Quebec City, Province of Canada, British North America.
Chester	United Kingdom	The sloop was holed by an anchor and sank at Hubberston Pill, Pembrokeshire.
Echo	United Kingdom	The ship was driven ashore on "Rogoe Island". She was on a voyage from Hull, Yorkshire to Narva, Russia.
Esther	(United Kingdom of Great Britain and Ireland) British North America	The ship was wrecked in the Saint Lawrence River. She was on a voyage from Charlottetown, Prince Edward Island to Quebec City.
Favourite	United Kingdom	The tug was severely damaged by fire at Newcastle upon Tyne, Northumberla. Subsequently repaired and returned to service
Freihandel	Prussia	The ship ran aground off Helsingør, Denmark. She was on a voyage from Memel to London, United Kingdom. She was refloated the next day.
Golden Spring	United Kingdom	The ship ran aground off Pelican Point, Ottoman Empire. She was refloated on 27 October and taken in to Smyrna.
Good Intent	United Kingdom	The ship was driven ashore at Quebec City.
Grace	United Kingdom	The ship ran aground on the Holme Sand, in the North Sea off the coast of Suffolk. She was on a voyage from Kronstadt, Russia to London. She was refloated.
President	United States	The ship was driven ashore and wrecked at Saint John, New Brunswick, British North America. She was on a voyage from Saint John to Liverpool, Lancashire, United Kingdom. She was refloated on 2 November.
Sophia	United Kingdom	The ship was driven ashore at Quebec City.
Stadacona	United Kingdom	The ship was driven ashore at Quebec City.
Wave	United Kingdom	The ship was driven ashore near the Sarop Lighthouse, Russia. She was on a voyage from Hull to Narva.

== 26 October ==
List of shipwrecks: 26 October 1853
Ship	State	Description
Acadia	United Kingdom	The ship was driven ashore at Rimouski, Province of Canada, British North America. She was on a voyage from Liverpool, Lancashire to Quebec City, Province of Canada.
Agincourt	United Kingdom	The ship ran aground on the Horse Sand, in the Solent. She was on a voyage from Southampton, Hampshire to Geelong, Victoria. She was refloated and towed back to Southampton for repairs.
Dreadnought	United Kingdom	The tug was severely damaged by fire at Liverpool, Lancashire. A fireman was drowned when he fell into the dock. Two others were severely injured when they fell into the hold.
Mary Gibson	United Kingdom	The ship ran aground on the Shipwash Sand, in the North Sea off the coast of Essex. She was on a voyage from South Shields, County Durham to Venice, Kingdom of Lombardy–Venetia. She was refloated and taken in to Harwich, Essex in a leaky condition.
Victoire Sophie	France	The ship foundered off the "Labervrack Lighthouse" with the loss of all but one of her crew. She was on a voyage from Sunderland, County Durham to Saint-Vaast-la-Hougue, Manche.

== 27 October ==
List of shipwrecks: 27 October 1853
Ship	State	Description
Chester	United Kingdom	The ship struck the Hubberstone Pill, in the Bristol Channel and sank. She was on a voyage from Llanelly, Glamorgan to Newry, County Antrim.
Olga	(Russian Empire) Grand Duchy of Finland	The ship ran aground on the Fahludd Reef, in the Baltic Sea. She was on a voyage from Turku to Livorno, Grand Duchy of Tuscany.
Tartar	United Kingdom	The ship was in collision with the steamship Gazelle and sank in the North Sea off Spurn Point, Yorkshire. Her crew were rescued.
Therese	Danzig	The ship was wrecked on Trinidad. She was on a voyage from Bordeaux, Gironde, France to the River Plate.

== 28 October ==
List of shipwrecks: 28 October 1853
Ship	State	Description
Citizen	United Kingdom	The sloop was driven ashore on the coast of Lincolnshire. She was on a voyage from Boston, Lincolnshire to Stockton-on-Tees, County Durham. She was refloated and put back to Boston.
John and Anne	(United Kingdom of Great Britain and Ireland) Isle of Man	The ship was wrecked at Cooley Point, County Louth.
Josephina	Flag unknown	The ship was driven ashore on "Doyeskar". She was refloated and taken in to Marstrand, Sweden.
Talisman	United Kingdom	The ship was wrecked on Cape North, Nova Scotia, British North America. She was on a voyage from Pictou, Nova Scotia to Newcastle upon Tyne, Northumberland.
William Bateman	Danzig	The ship was driven ashore north of Helsingør, Denmark. She was on a voyage from Liverpool, Lancashire, United Kingdom to Stettin.

== 29 October ==
List of shipwrecks: 29 October 1853
Ship	State	Description
HMS Arethusa	Royal Navy	The Constance-class frigate ran aground in the Dardanelles. She was refloated the next day.
Ariel	United Kingdom	The ship ran aground off "Nahr", Sweden. She was on a voyage from Kronstadt, Russia to Helsingør, Denmark.
HMS Furious	United Kingdom	The Furious-class frigate struck a sunken rock in the Dardanelles 20 nautical miles (37 km) from Gallipoli, Ottoman Empire and was damaged.
Metropolitan	United Kingdom	The steamship ran aground off Ballywalter, County Down. She was on a voyage from Glasgow, Renfrewshire to London.
HMS Rodney	Royal Navy	The Rodney-class ship of the line ran aground in the Dardanelles. She was refloated with assistance from HMS Firebrand (Royal Navy).
Vittoria	United Kingdom	The ship was driven ashore at Quebec City, Province of Canada, British North America.

== 30 October ==
List of shipwrecks: 30 October 1853
Ship	State	Description
Austria	United States	The ship was driven ashore at Cape Romain, South Carolina. Her passengers were taken off by the steamship Charleston (United States). Austria was on a voyage from Liverpool, Lancashire, United Kingdom to Charleston, South Carolina.
Countess of Derby	(United Kingdom of Great Britain and Ireland) New South Wales	The ship ran aground and was wrecked in Moreton Bay. She was on a voyage from Port Jackson to Moreton Bay.
Ellen	United Kingdom	The ship sank at Duncannon, County Wexford. Her crew were rescued. She was on a voyage from Duncannon to Liverpool. She was refloated on 8 November and taken in to Waterford.
Emerald Isle	United Kingdom	The schooner was run into by a Danish brig and sank in the Irish Sea. Her crew survived. She was on a voyage from London to Liverpool.
Hyperion	United States	The barque sprang a leak and foundered in the Atlantic Ocean (35°10′N 73°45′W) with the loss of eight of her twelve crew. Survivors were rescued on 2 November by Edward Everett (United Kingdom). Hyperion was on a voyage from New York to Jamaica.
Lady Eleanor	United Kingdom	The ship was driven ashore and wrecked at Peterhead, Aberdeenshire. She was on a voyage from Peterhead to the Firth of Forth.
Regia	United Kingdom	The brig ran aground in the River Suir 1 nautical mile (1.9 km) downstream of Waterford and was damaged. She was on a voyage from Galaţi, Ottoman Empire to Waterford.

== 31 October ==
List of shipwrecks: 31 October 1853
Ship	State	Description
Active	United Kingdom	The smack was driven ashore near Pentewan, Cornwall. She was on a voyage from Plymouth, Devon to Falmouth, Cornwall. She was refloated on 13 November and taken in to Pentewan for repairs.
Amaranthe	Prussia	The ship was driven ashore near "Fultscha", County Cork, United Kingdom. She was on a voyage from Galaţi, Ottoman Empire to Queenstown, County Cork.
Clementina	United Kingdom	The ship ran aground on the Barnard Sand, in the North Sea off the coast of Suffolk. She was on a voyage from Cartagena, Spain to Newcastle upon Tyne, Northumberland. She was refloated and put in to Lowestoft, Suffolk in a leaky condition.
Edgecombe	United Kingdom	The brig was driven ashore and severely damaged near Stranraer, Wigtownshire. She was on a voyage from Maryport, Cumberland to Dublin. She was refloated on 15 November.
Effort	United Kingdom	The smack was driven ashore at Bunbeg, County Donegal. She was on a voyage from Bunbeg to Glasgow, Renfrewshire.
Firefly	United Kingdom	The schooner was wrecked on the Arklow Bank, in the Irish Sea off the coast of County Wicklow. She was on a voyage from Liverpool, Lancashire to Haiti. The wreck was towed in to Wicklow on 2 November but broke up there.
Jane Cathrine	United Kingdom	The barque was driven ashore between Point Henry and Point Richards, Victoria.
Lucy	United Kingdom	The ship was driven ashore on the Isle of Man. She was on a voyage from Liverpool to Mobile, Alabama, United States. She was refloated on 13 March 1854 but had to be beached. Lucy was refloated on 7 September and taken in to Ardrossan, Ayrshire, where she arrived the next day.
Luiza	United Kingdom	The ship was driven ashore and severely damaged in the Bay of Luce. She was on a voyage from Waterford to Glasgow.
Mary	United Kingdom	The smack was driven ashore and wrecked at Gatehouse of Fleet, Wigtownshire. She was on a voyage from Plymouth to Gatehouse of Fleet.
Pondicherry	France	The full-rigged ship was driven ashore at the Melbourne Heads, New South Wales. She was refloated on 2 November.
Providence	United Kingdom	The ship struck the Little Frine Rock, off Port-Navalo, Morbihan, France. She was on a voyage from Newcastle upon Tyne to Nantes, Loire-Inférieure. She was taken in to Port-Navalo for repairs.
Thomas and Mary	United Kingdom	The sloop was driven ashore in Lough Swilly. She was on a voyage from the Clyde to Ballina, County Mayo. She was refloated and taken in to Rathmullen, County Donegal.
Union	United Kingdom	The ship was driven ashore and wrecked at Swansea, Glamorgan. She was on a voyage from Ballinacurra, County Cork to Bristol, Gloucestershire.

== Unknown date ==
List of shipwrecks: Unknown date in October 1853
Ship	State	Description
Adolfo	Chile	The ship was wrecked on the Baja California Peninsula, Mexico before 14 October. Her crew were rescued.
Anna	Chile	The brig was lost in the Chiloé Archipelago before 14 October. Her crew were rescued.
Apame	United Kingdom	The ship was lost in the Irish Sea between 29 October and 1 November. She was on a voyage from Liverpool, Lancashire to Lisbon, Portugal.
Arab	United Kingdom	The ship was driven ashore at Shemogue, New Brunswick, British North America before 11 October. She was on a voyage from Bathurst, New Brunswick to London.
Ava	United Kingdom	The ship was driven ashore near Sulina, Ottoman Empire before 27 October. She was on a voyage from Liverpool to Galaţi, Ottoman Empire. She had been refloated by 31 October.
Beerta	Flag unknown	The ship was abandoned in the Atlantic Ocean before 13 October.
Campellan	France	The brig was wrecked in the Strait of Gibraltar. Her crew were rescued.
Champion	United States	The schooner was lost in the Bay of St. Lawrence. Crew saved.
Charlotte	United Kingdom	The ship was destroyed by fire in the Baltic Sea. She was on a voyage from Riga, Russia to Helsingør, Denmark.
Cherie	United Kingdom	The ship was abandoned in the Chops of the Channel. Her crew were rescued by Marie (France). Cherie was on a voyage from British Honduras to London.
Corea	United Kingdom	The ship was abandoned in the Atlantic Ocean before 4 October. She was on a voyage from Gloucester to Quebec City, Province of Canada, British North America.
Crescent	United Kingdom	The ship ran aground and was damaged off the Filsand Lighthouse, Russia. She was on a voyage from Sunderland, County Durham to Kronstadt, Russia. She was refloated and completed her voyage, arriving at Kronstadt in a leaky condition on 4 October.
Eliza	United Kingdom	The ship was driven ashore in the White Sea. She was on a voyage from Onega, Russia to London. She was refloated and put in to Arkhangelsk, where she arrived on 5 October in a leaky condition.
Emerald	United Kingdom	The schooner was wrecked on the Duddon Sands, Lancashire before 25 October with the loss of all hands. She was on a voyage from Wexford to Lancaster, Lancashire.
Emily	United Kingdom	The schooner was driven ashore at Ship Harbour, Nova Scotia, British North America. She was on a voyage from Halifax, Nova Scotia to Baltimore, Maryland.
Ernest	France	The schooner foundered in the North Sea off Flamborough Head, Yorkshire, United Kingdom before 23 October. She was on a voyage from Caen, Calvados to Dundee, Forfarshire, United Kingdom.
Fairy Queen	(United Kingdom of Great Britain and Ireland) British North America	The steamship was wrecked with the loss of seventeen lives.
Feliz	Chile	The fill-rigged ship was wrecked at "Sotille" before 14 October.
Franklin	Sweden	The ship was abandoned in the Atlantic Ocean. She was on a voyage from Peru to a British port.
Georgetown	United States	The steamship sank in the Mississippi River without loss of life.
H. G. Tiris	Netherlands	The galiot was abandoned in the Atlantic Ocean before 13 October.
I. C. I. van Speyk	Netherlands	The ship was wrecked on "Morchwetz", in the White Sea before 29 October. Her crew were rescued. She was on a voyage from Arkhangelsk to Rotterdam, South Holland.
Ida	United Kingdom	The ship was abandoned in the Atlantic Ocean before 24 October She was on a voyage from Cardiff to Quebec City.
Importer	United Kingdom	The ship was driven ashore at Saltfleet, Lincolnshire. She was on a voyage from Wisbech, Cambridgeshire to Grangemouth, Stirlingshire. She was refloated on 18 October and taken in to Grimsby, Lincolnshire in a leaky condition.
Jane Cumming	United Kingdom	The ship ran aground on a reef off Boa Vista Island, Cape Verde Islands. She was refloated and taken in to "English Harbour". She was consequently condemned.
Jeanne Emelie	France	The lugger was wrecked on the Longsand, in the North Sea off the coast of Essex, United Kingdom. Her crew were rescued by the smack Tryal (United Kingdom).
John and Susan	United Kingdom	The ship was driven ashore at Huttoft, Lincolnshire before 17 October.
Lady Elgin	(United Kingdom of Great Britain and Ireland) British North America	The steamship sank in the Saint Lawrence River 3 nautical miles (5.6 km) downstream of Trois-Rivières, Province of Canada before 19 October. Her passengers were rescued.
Lapland	United Kingdom	The ship was wrecked at Trescot, Maine, United States. She was on a voyage from Saint John, New Brunswick, British North America to Liverpool. She had been refloated by 14 November.
Louie	Prussia	The brig was abandoned in the North Sea. She was on a voyage from Antwerp, Belgium to Memel. She was taken in to Egersund, Norway in a derelict condition on 17 October.
Louise	France	The barque was driven ashore and wrecked in the Dry Tortugas before 9 October. She was on a voyage from Havre de Grâce, Seine-Inférieure to La Guaira, Venezuela.
Luise	Rostock	The ship was driven ashore on "Oarlas Island", Russia. She was on a voyage from Saint Petersburg, Russia to Leith, Lothian, United Kingdom. She was refloated and put in to Reval, Russia, where she arrived on 4 October in a leaky condition.
Margina Willemina	Netherlands	The ship was driven ashore at Domesnes, Russia before 2 October. She was on a voyage from Riga, Russia to the Meuse (Dutch: Maas).
Marie Aglae	France	The ship foundered in the North Sea. Her crew survived. She was on a voyage from Newcastle upon Tyne, Northumberland, United Kingdom to Nantes, Loire-Inférieure.
Marys and Anns	United Kingdom	The ship was wrecked at Cefn Sidan, Carmarthenshire in early October with the loss of four of her seven crew.
Nina	United Kingdom	The ship was driven ashore near Adelaide, South Australia. She was on a voyage from Canton, China to Adelaide. She was refloated on 8 October and taken in to Adelaide.
Ornens	Norway	The ship foundered in the Baltic Sea. Her crew were rescued.
Osca	Flag unknown	The ship was abandoned in the Atlantic Ocean.
Oswego	United States	The full-rigged ship was driven ashore at Belize City, British Honduras.
Posthumous	(United Kingdom of Great Britain and Ireland) Victoria	The barque was wrecked near "Kiaparee" before October. Her crew were rescued.
Rainha	Portuguese Navy	The frigate was run ashore and wrecked at Belém before 10 October.
Rose	France	The brig was lost in the North Sea before 23 October.
HM Hired vessel Rose	Royal Navy	The ship was driven ashore and wrecked on St. Peter's Island, Prince Edward Island, British North America. Her crew were rescued.
Sandwich	United Kingdom	The ship was wrecked on Salt Key before 18 October. Her crew were rescued. She was on a voyage from Newfoundland, British North America to Havana, Cuba.
Sertum	(United Kingdom of Great Britain and Ireland) Guernsey	The ship ran aground on the Copper Grounds, off Læsø, Denmark. She was on a voyage from Danzig to Guernsey. She broke up on 16 October.
Teazer	(United Kingdom of Great Britain and Ireland) Jersey	The ship was driven ashore in the Gut of Canso before 13 October. She was on a voyage from Paspébiac, Province of Canada to a port in Brazil. She was later refloated.
Vittoria	Flag unknown	The barque was wrecked at Rivière-du-Loup, Province of Canada in late October.
Wakefield	United Kingdom	The ship was abandoned in the Atlantic Ocean. Her crew were rescued by a Norwegian barque.
William	United Kingdom	The schooner was driven ashore at Milligan Point, County Londonderry before 4 October. She was refloated on 7 October and taken in to Greencastle, County Donegal.
