= BD Bacatá =

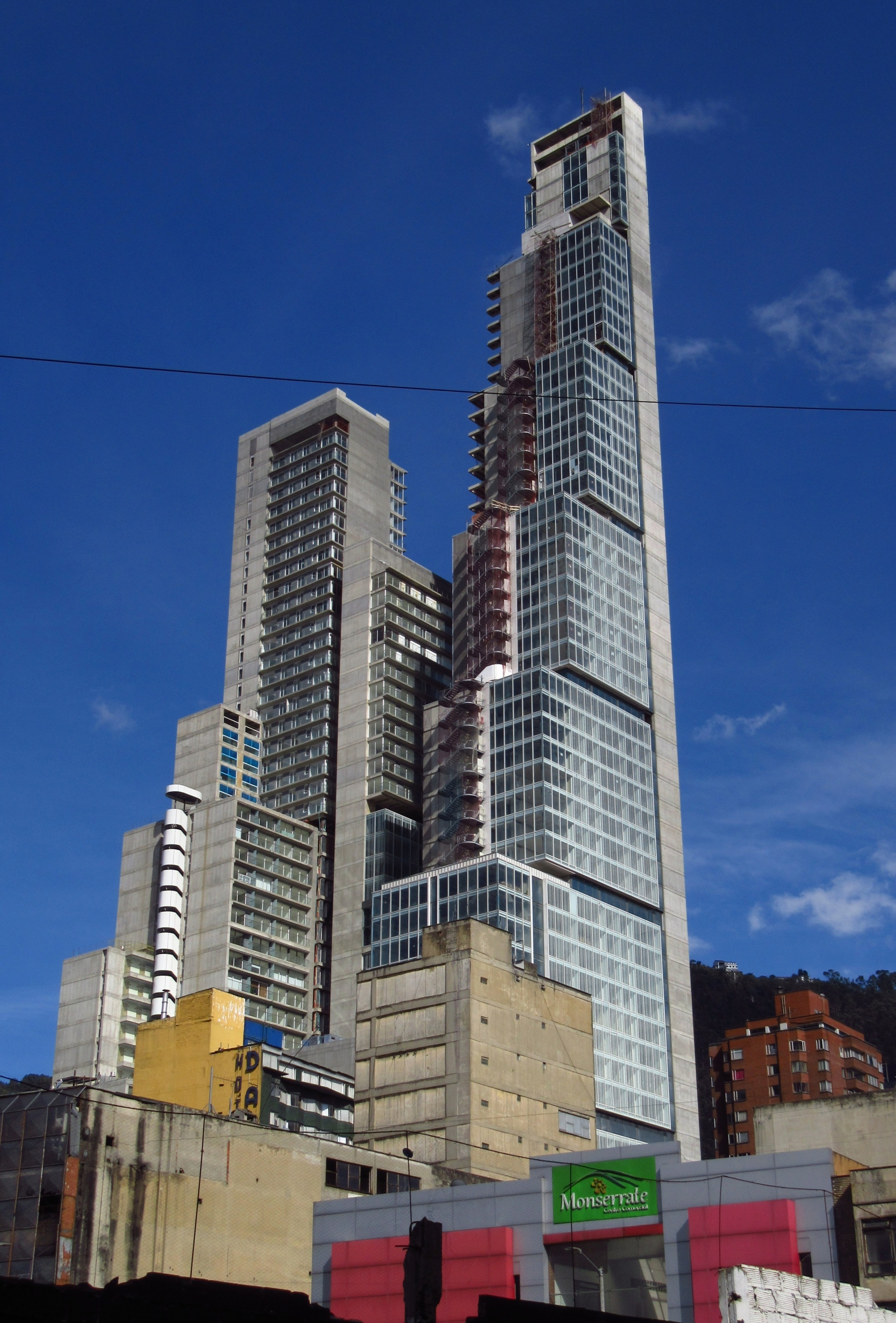
- BD Bacatá under construction
- Interactive map of the BD Bacatá area
- Hotel chain: Eurostars

Record height
- Tallest in Colombia since 2 April 2015^{[I]}
- Preceded by: Torre Colpatria, Bogotá; 196 m (643 ft)

General information
- Type: Mixed-use
- Location: Calle 19 #5-20, Santa Fe, Bogotá, Colombia
- Coordinates: 4°36′17.1″N 74°04′13.2″W
- Named for: Hotel Bacatá
- Construction started: October 2011
- Topped-out: 24 July 2015
- Estimated completion: unknown

Height
- Architectural: South tower: 216 m (709 ft); North tower: 167 m (548 ft)

Technical details
- Floor count: South tower: 67 floors; North tower: 56 floors

Design and construction
- Architecture firm: Grupo Alonso Balaguer
- Developer: BD Promotores
- Structural engineer: Prabyc Ingenieros

Other information
- Number of stores: 30
- Number of rooms: 300
- Parking: 739 places; 405 private; 334 public

Website
- www.pbpsa.com/case-studies/bd-bacata---bogota-co

BD Bacatá (abbreviation for Bogotá Downtown Bacatá) is an architectural complex currently under construction in Bogotá, Colombia, featuring the tallest building in the country, surpassing the Torre Colpatria, and the sixth tallest in South America. The South Tower is 67 stories high and covers a total surface area of 1,200,000 square feet (111,480 m^{2}). Development includes office and retail space, apartments and a 364-room hotel, replacing the former Hotel Bacatá that was constructed in the same location. It will be the tallest skyscraper in Colombia, and the first crowdfunded skyscraper, meaning that it was funded by private individuals through the purchase of shares and fiduciary rights allowed under Colombian law.

The project's main investor, Spanish national Venerando Lamelas, stopped disbursing funds to the contractor Prabyc Ingenieros, leaving the works unfinished. The company Total Co took over the project's recovery in the final quarter of 2024, with a plan to complete the unfinished floors of the South Tower and renovate apartments in line with sales flow; however, by early 2026 the company reported that 30% of the work remained to be done. A total of 133 billion COP $ in debt has been registered.

== Name origin ==
The complex was named after an old hotel which used to be in the construction site, but was sold to the Spanish design firm, Alonso Balaguer. The old hotel was demolished; however, its name will remain, as it acknowledges Bogotá's (and Colombia's) indigenous heritage.

== Design ==
The BD Bacatá complex has the two tallest buildings in Colombia, one with 67 stories, where the new hotel, owned by the Spanish firm Eurostars, will be operating; and the other with 56 stories. The main materials used in the construction of the skyscraper are glass, aluminium and concrete. Both buildings will be connected by a pedestrian footpath in the first floor through the mall's platform, shared by both of them, and it will also have two pedestrian bridges, located in the 14 and 25 floors of both towers.

In the south tower, where the hotel will be located, the predominant material will be glass, notable in the curtain wall planned for it. The office section, located in the north tower, will also have a glass facade and the apartments section will have windows from floor to ceiling, and balconies.

Power generation equipment is located on the lower floors, with electricity distributed via busbar systems to electrical substations on the upper floors. A building-wide water management system minimises waste by recycling greywater through a three-cycle reuse system, including rainwater harvesting. Materials used in construction include 56,000 m³ of concrete, 25,000 m² of glass, and 11,500 tonnes of steel.

== Construction ==
BD Bacatá is the world's first crowdfunded skyscraper. It is the first skyscraper to be built in Colombia in 35 years. The structure is financed by over 3,800 ordinary Colombians.

The site was previously occupied by the Hotel Bacatá, which was fully demolished in October 2011 before excavation and foundation works began. Due to the constrained footprint, the excavation employed a top-down ring system to construct the seven basement levels. Workers excavated a few metres at a time to form each basement floor slab and retaining walls, leaving a central void through which they excavated progressively deeper, floor by floor. This process ultimately allowed for the construction of approximately 300 piles, 40 metres deep and between 90 cm and 2.5 m in diameter, which support the superstructure. By December 2012, all retaining walls — between 35 m and 45 m deep — had been completed and excavation of the basement levels was under way.

On 15 April 2014, above-grade construction of the south tower's 67 floors commenced. The construction process allowed one floor per week to be completed, with each level built in a stepped, consecutive sequence.

On 19 April 2015, while construction was under way on the 51st floor, BD Bacatá surpassed the Torre Colpatria — which has 50 floors — in number of storeys. That same month, demolition began on the piles that had served as temporary support for the basement retaining ring during the foundation phase. On 2 June 2015, the building surpassed the height of the Colpatria Tower, which had held the title of Colombia's tallest building for 36 years. On 24 July 2015, the final slab of the south tower was poured, completing 67 floors and the full 216 m height, while the north tower was still under construction at floor 30. On 9 December 2015, the north tower also surpassed the Colpatria Tower, becoming the country's second tallest structure. On 20 December, the final slab of the north tower was poured, completing its 56 floors and 167 m.

On 24 February 2016, the structural work was completed and inauguration was scheduled for the following year. However, works were delayed and came to a halt in early 2018 due to financing difficulties. In March 2019, it was announced that construction would resume with a target completion in the second half of 2020. This was again derailed when works were suspended during the COVID-19 lockdown, pushing completion to an indefinite date.

== Gallery ==
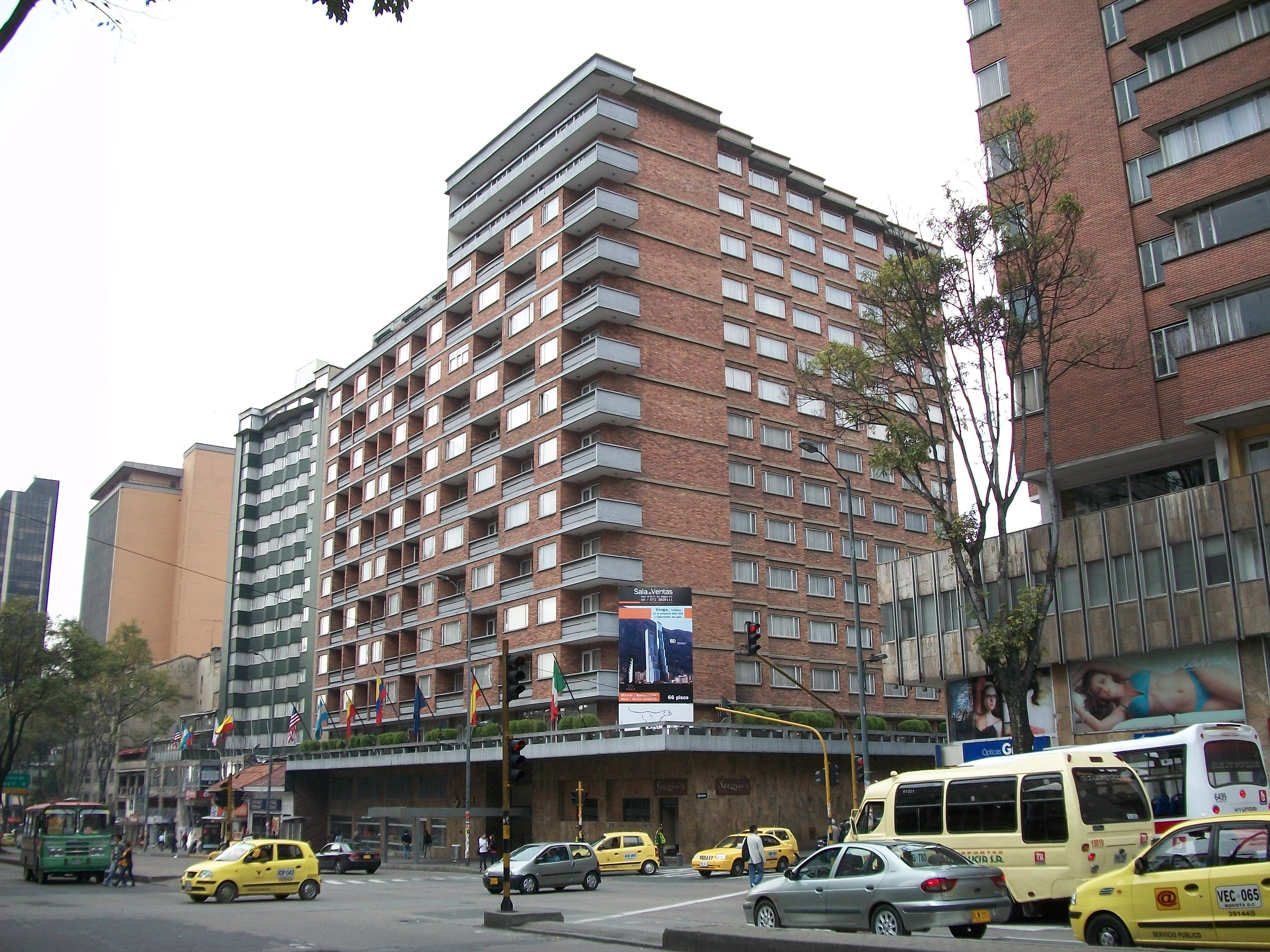
Hotel Bacatá before demolition, 2011

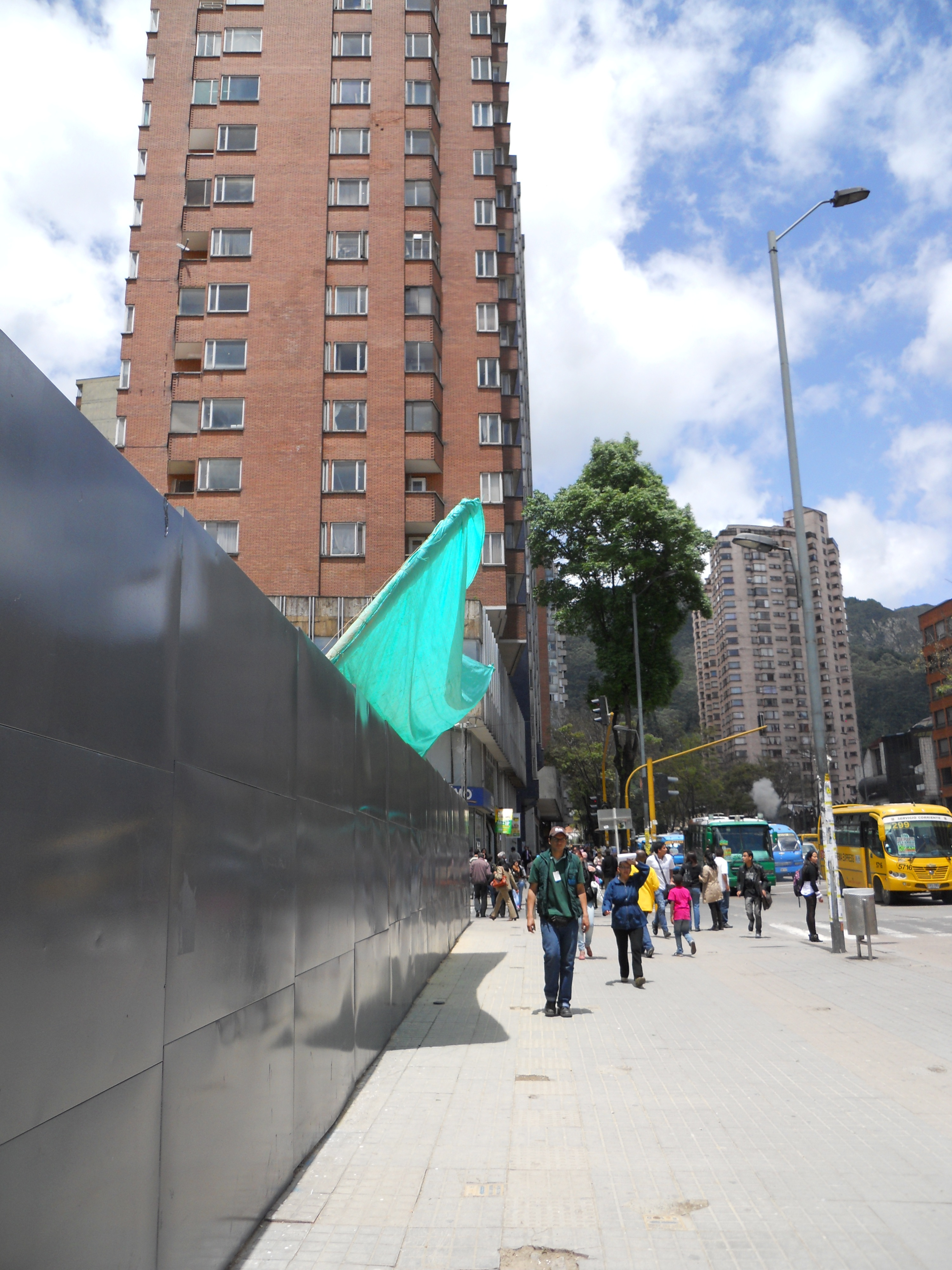
Bogotá before BD Bacatá

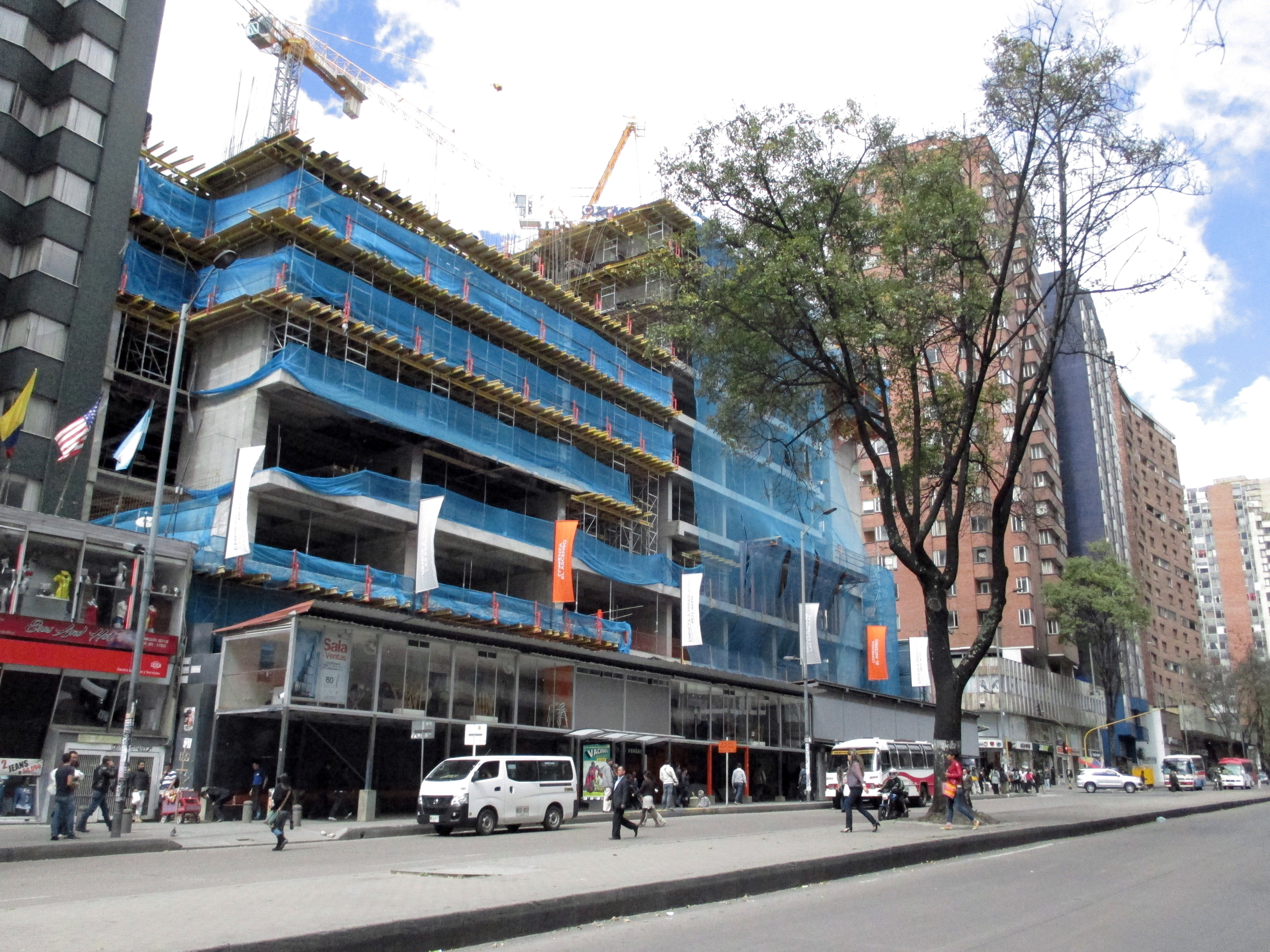
BD Bacatá, July 2013

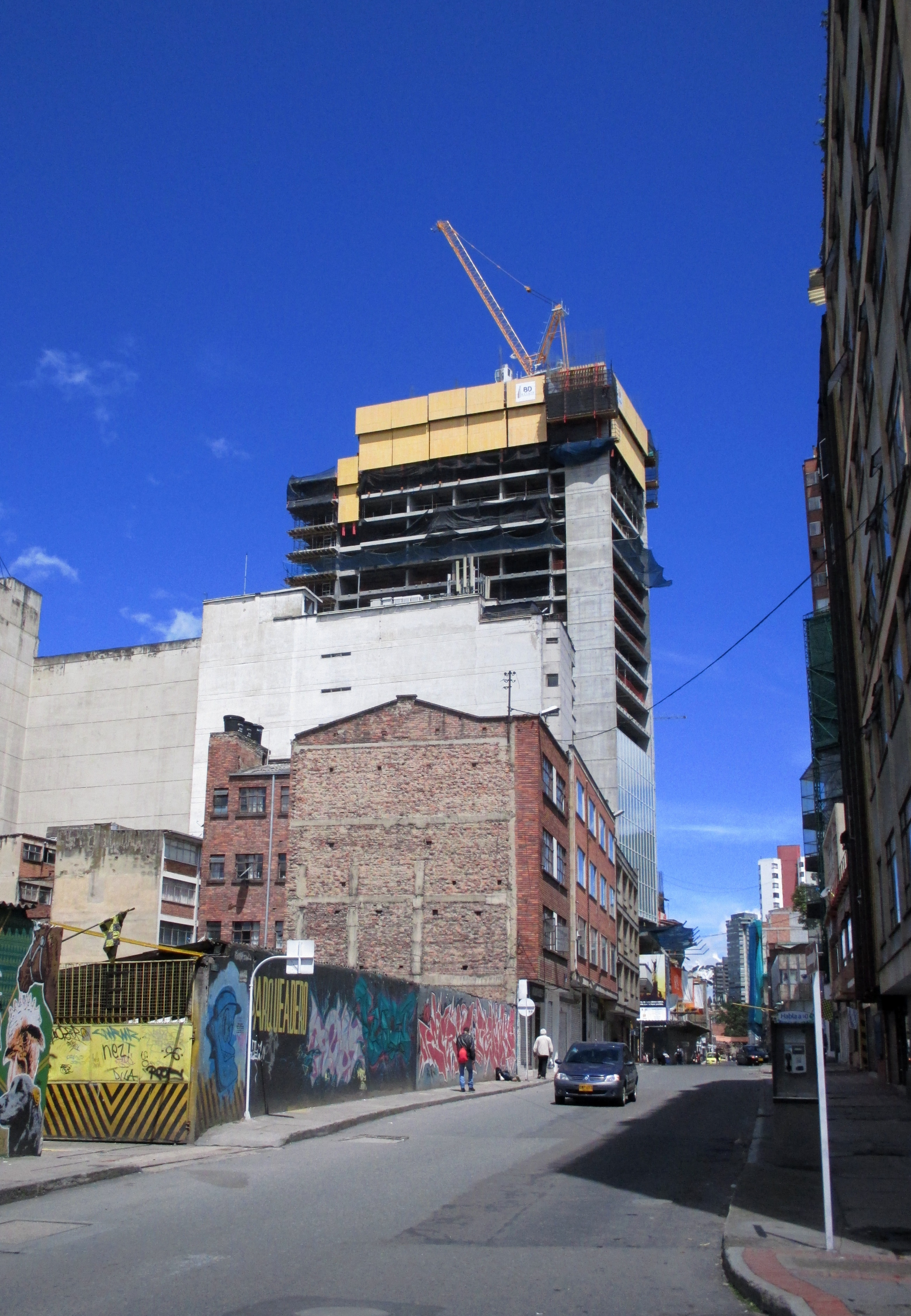
November 2013
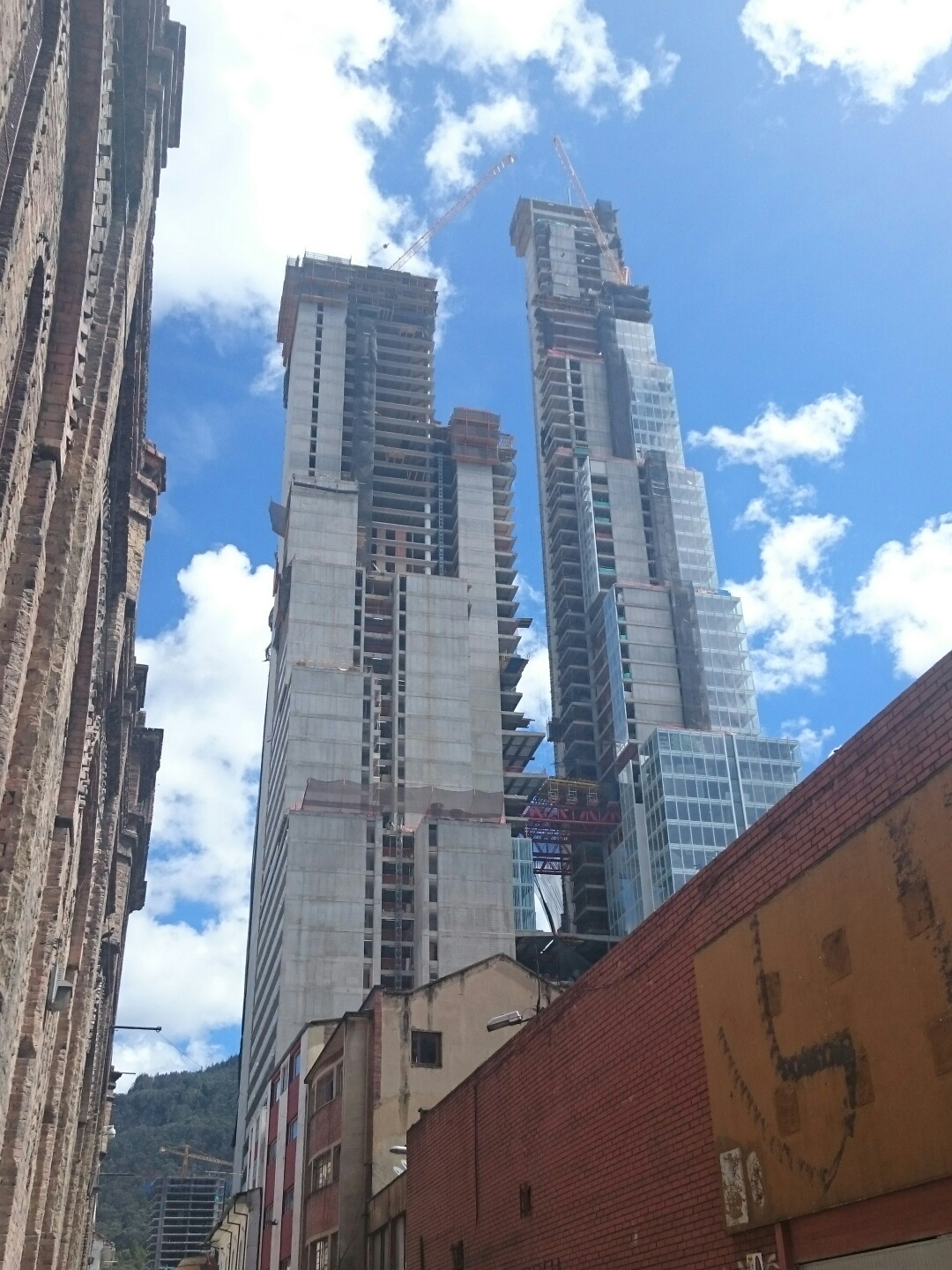
BD Bacatá, December 2015

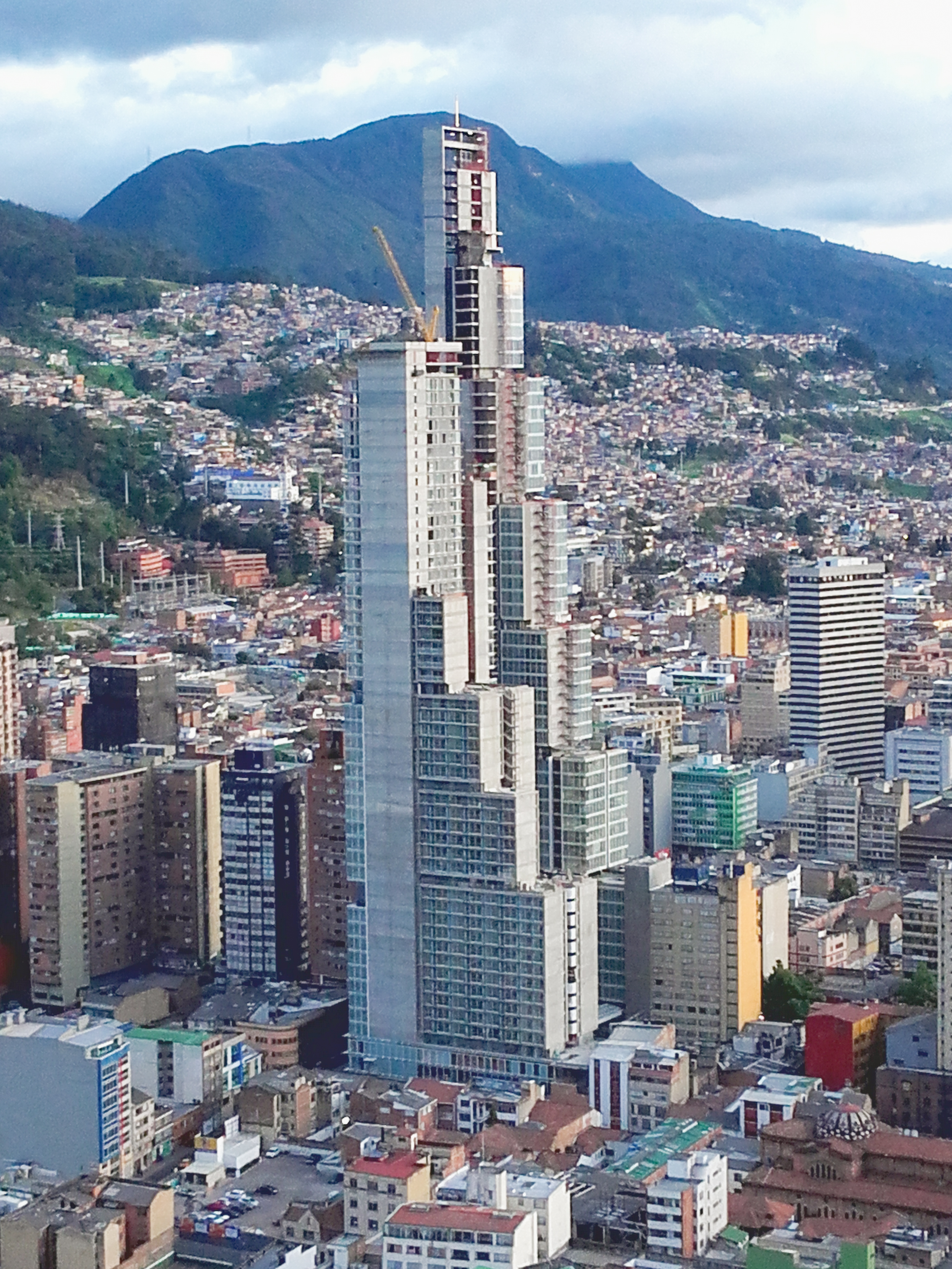
In September 2016

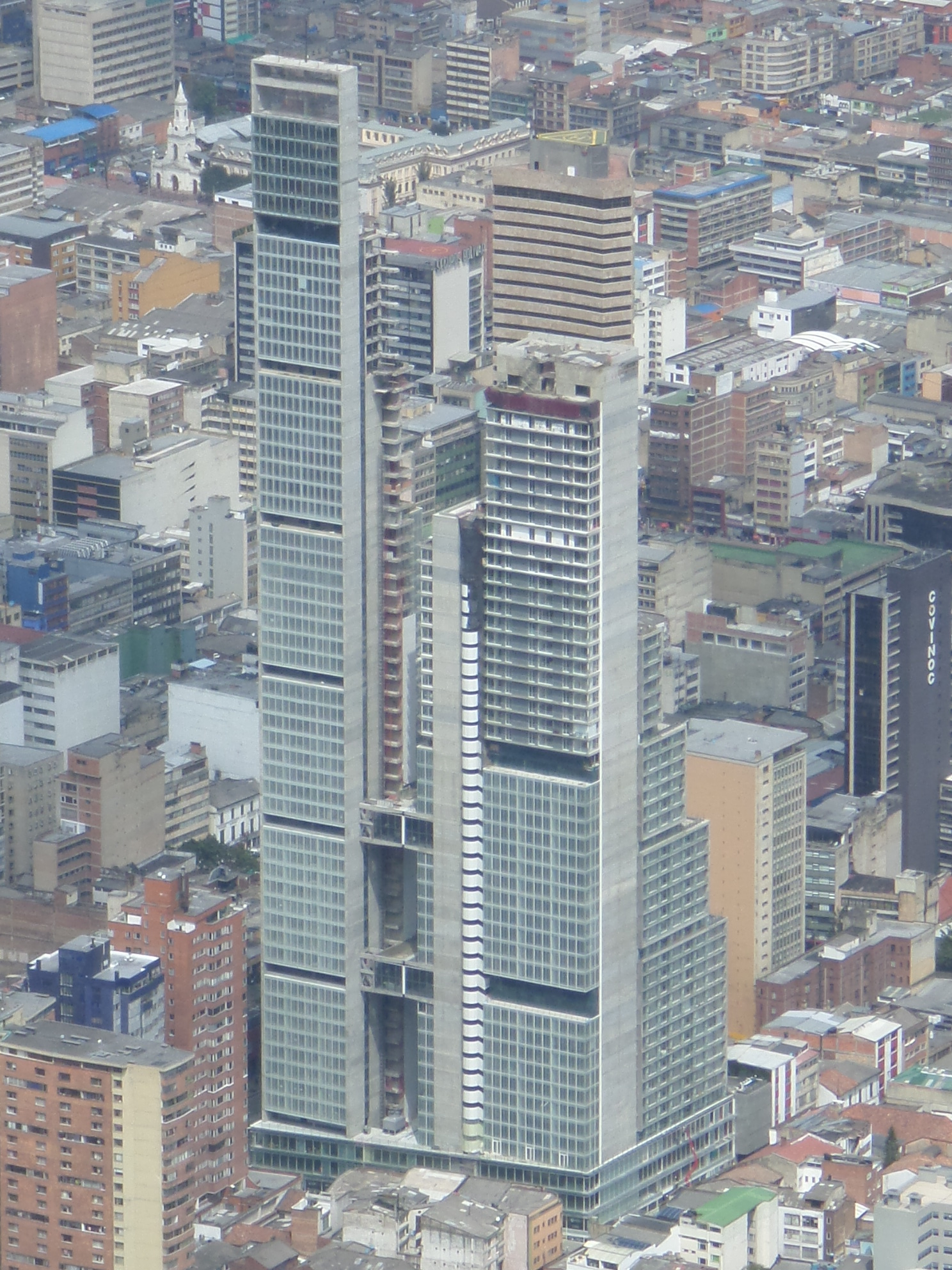
In April 2017

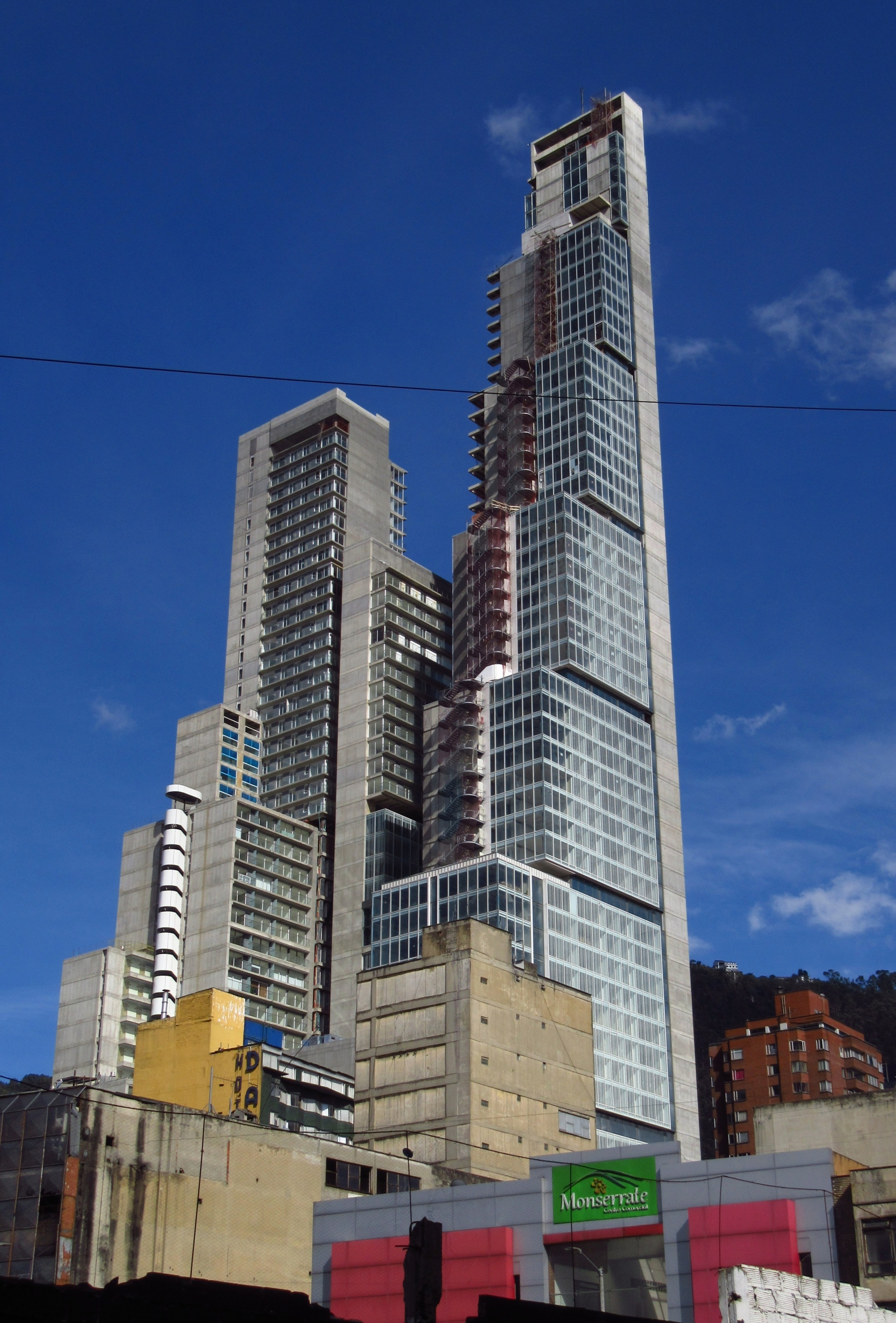
In May 2018
