= 2024 Bilderberg Conference =

Europe–North America forum in Madrid

2024 Bilderberg Conference 70th Bilderberg Meeting
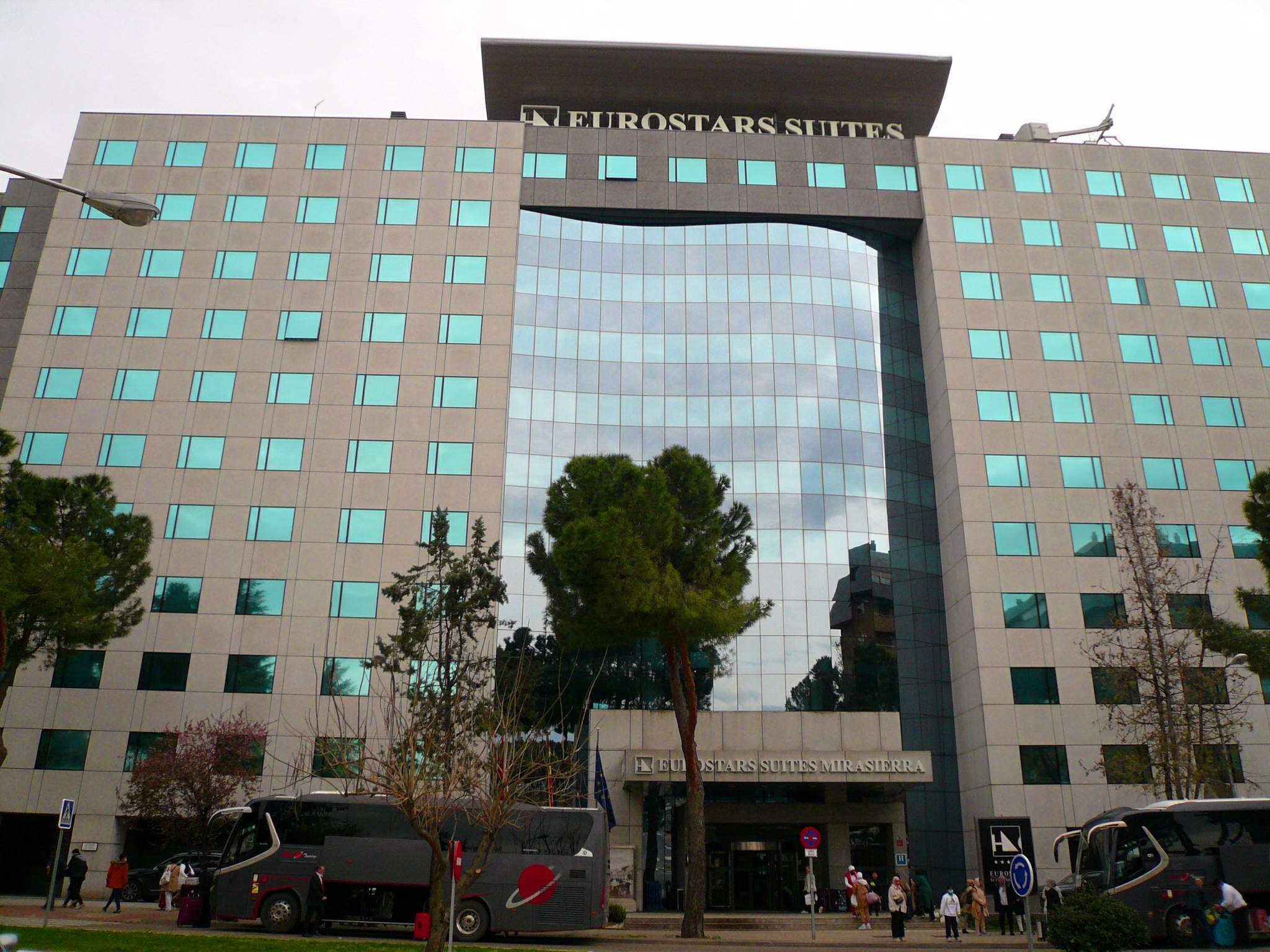
- Host country: Spain
- Date: May 30–June 2, 2024
- Cities: Madrid
- Venues: Eurostars Suites Mirasierra
- Participants: c. 130 from 23 countries
- Follows: 2023 Bilderberg Conference
- Precedes: 2025 Bilderberg Conference
- Website: https://bilderbergmeetings.org/meetings/meeting-2024/

The 2024 Bilderberg Conference was held between May 30–June 2, 2024 in Madrid, Spain at the Eurostars Suites Mirasierra hotel. The 2024 meeting was the 70th edition of the event. A Bilderberg Group press release stated that there were 131 participants from around 25 countries.

Established in 1954 by Prince Bernhard of the Netherlands, Bilderberg conferences (or meetings) are an annual private gathering of the European and North American political and business elite. Events are attended by between 120 and 150 people each year invited by the Bilderberg Group's steering committee; including prominent politicians, CEOs, national security experts, academics and journalists. Several US presidents have attended the meetings before winning a presidential election. These politicians include Bill Clinton and Barack Obama.

Bilderberg conferences operate under the Chatham House Rule, meaning that participants are sworn to secrecy and cannot disclose the identity or affiliation of any particular speaker.

== Agenda ==
The key topics for discussion were announced on the Bilderberg website shortly before the meeting. These topics included:

- State of AI
- AI Safety
- Changing Faces of Biology
- Climate
- Future of Warfare
- Geopolitical Landscape
- Europe's Economic Challenges
- US Economic Challenges
- US Political Landscape
- Ukraine and the World
- Middle East
- China
- Russia

== Participants ==
A list of 131 participants was published on the Bilderberg website. This list may not be complete, as a source connected to the Bilderberg group told The Daily Telegraph in 2013 that some attendees do not have their names publicized. King Felipe VI of Spain was reported to have attended the meeting despite his name not being on the list.

Austria

- Pamela Rendi-Wagner
- Robert Zadrazil
- Gerhard Zeiler

Belgium

- Ilham Kadri
- Thomas Leysen
- Karel Verhoeven

Canada

- Yoshua Bengio
- Mark J. Carney
- François-Philippe Champagne
- Evan Siddall

Denmark

- Bjarne Corydon
- Connie Hedegaard
- Søren Pind

Estonia

- Kaja Kallas

European Union (International)

- Nadia Calviño
- Paschal Donohoe
- Paolo Gentiloni
- Wopke Hoekstra
- Ylva Johansson
- Charles Michel
- Maroš Šefčovič

Finland

- Anders Adlercreutz
- Erkki Liikanen
- Alexander Stubb
- Erja Yläjärvi

France

- Patricia Barbizet
- Valérie Baudson
- Henri de Castries
- Arthur Mensch
- Agnès Pannier-Runacher
- Édouard Philippe
- Patrick Pouyanné

Germany

- Jamil Anderlini (Note: Identified as from Germany and the United States)
- Marco Buschmann
- Mathias Döpfner
- Friedrich Merz
- Wolfgang Schmidt
- Christian Sewing

Greece

- Niki Kerameus
- Alexis Papahelas
- Dimitri Papalexopoulos

Ireland

- Simon Coveney
- Michael O'Leary
- Leo Varadkar

Italy

- Marco Alverà
- Lorenzo Bini Smaghi
- Michele Della Vigna
- Giuliano da Empoli
- Lilli Gruber
- Mario Monti

NATO (International)

- James Appathurai
- Christopher Cavoli
- Jens Stoltenberg

Netherlands

- Charlene de Carvalho
- Caroline de Gruyter
- Victor Halberstadt
- Tom-Jan Meeus
- Willem-Alexander of the Netherlands
- Mark Rutte

Norway

- Kjerstin Braathen
- Øyvind Eriksen

Other (International)

- Alexander Gabuev

Poland

- Andrzej Domański
- Kasia Kieli
- Radoslaw Sikorski

Portugal

- José Manuel Barroso
- Isabel Gil
- Duarte Moreira

Russia

- Anatoly Chubays (Note: Identified as from Russia and Israel)

Spain

- José Manuel Albares
- Ana P. Botín
- Ildefonso Castro
- José Creuheras
- Carlos Cuerpo
- Sol Daurella Comadrán
- José M. Entrecanales
- Pablo Hernández de Cos
- Pedro J. Ramírez
- José Juan Ruiz

Sweden

- Daniel Ek
- Ann Linde
- Marcus Wallenberg

Switzerland

- Anna Fontcuberta i Morral
- André Kudelski

Turkey

- Mustafa Aydin
- Kadri Gürsel
- Sebnem Kalemli-Özcan
- Ömer Koç
- Mehmet Şimşek

Ukraine

- Dmytro Kuleba

United Kingdom

- Murray Auchincloss
- Demis Hassabis
- Zanny Minton Beddoes
- Gideon Rachman
- Wael Sawan
- John Sawers
- Mustafa Suleyman
- Martin H. Wolf

United Nations (International)

- Sigrid Kaag

United States

- Stacey Abrams
- Adewale Adeyemo
- Roger C. Altman
- Dario Amodei
- Anne Applebaum
- Albert Bourla
- Tarun Chhabra
- Jen Easterly
- Niall Ferguson
- Jonathan Finer
- Jane Fraser
- Kevin Harrington
- Mellody Hobson
- Alex Karp
- Stephen Kotkin
- Henry R. Kravis
- Marie-Josée Kravis
- Eric S. Lander
- Peter Lee
- Robert Lighthizer
- Palmer Luckey
- John Micklethwait
- David H. Petraeus
- Richard H. Phillips
- Nadia Schadlow
- Eric E. Schmidt
- Wendy R. Sherman
- Bret Stephens
- Peter Thiel
- Jonathan D. T. Ward
- Thomas Wright
- Fareed Zakaria
