= Duarte Moreira =

Portuguese and Swiss investor and entrepreneur

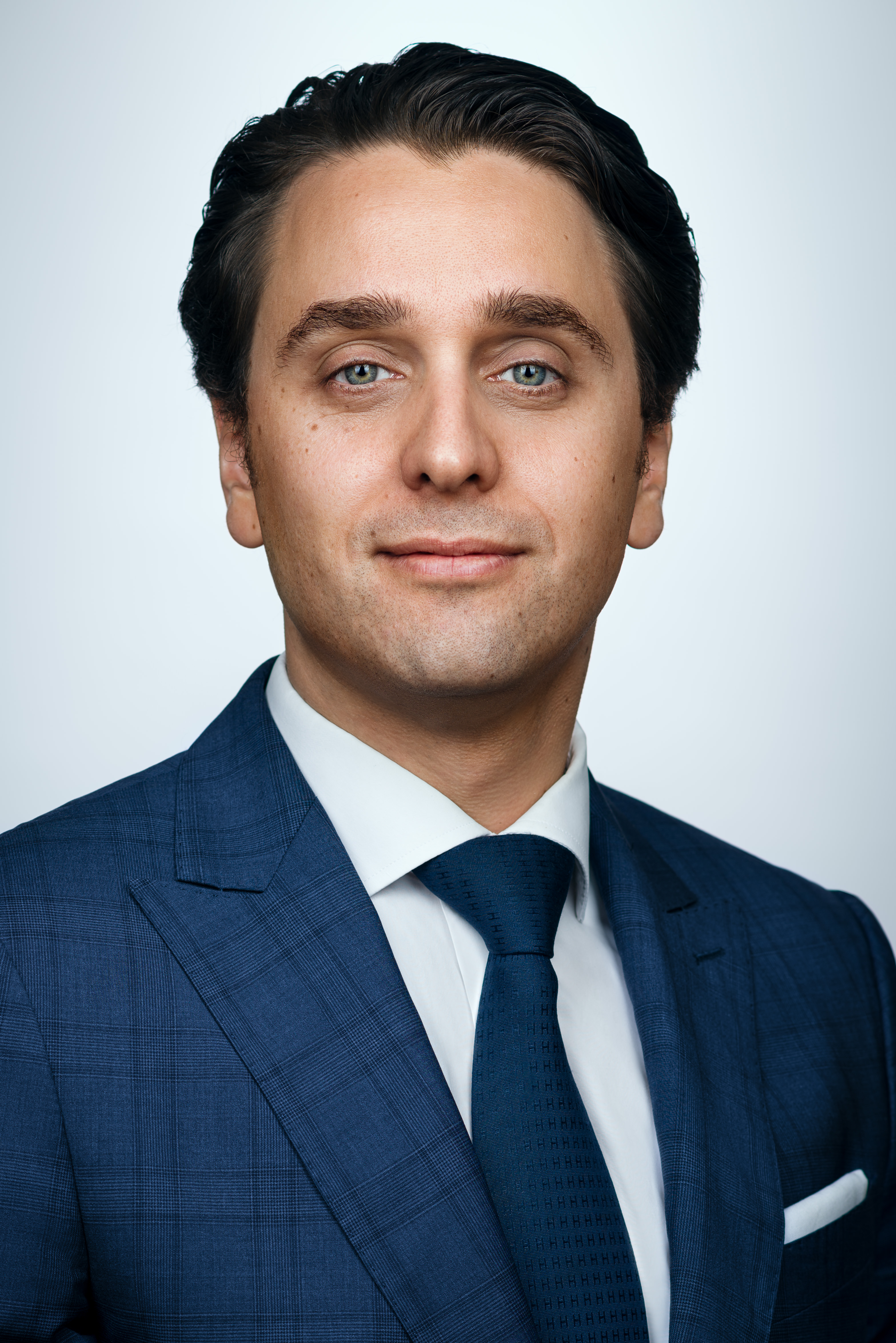
- Moreira in 2017
- Born: September 23, 1982 (age 43); Barcelos, Portugal
- Education: Warwick Business School (MBA)
- Occupations: Venture capitalist, investor and entrepreneur
- Known for: Co-founder and CEO of Zeno
- Children: 2

Duarte Luis Lima Constantino Moreira (born September 23, 1982) is a Portuguese and Swiss venture capitalist, investor and entrepreneur. He is a co-founder and CEO of Zeno Ventures and Zeno Partners, the Zeno Group. Zeno Ventures was in 2017, one of the first investors in both Mercury, and in Applied Intuition, the latest company of former Y Combinator COO Qasar Younis.

In 2023, 2024, and 2026, he participated in the 69th edition of the Bilderberg Meeting the 70th, and the 72nd edition of the Bilderberg Meeting, which brings together each year some of the most influential people in the Western World.

== Early life and education ==
He grew up in Barcelos, Portugal. He attended local schools and completed his secondary education in year 11 entering college without ever attending Year 12, where he studied law, Finance & Management in Portugal and in the United Kingdom.

Duarte Moreira obtained an MBA from Warwick Business School at the University of Warwick, UK.

== Career ==
Duarte Moreira started his career as an investor in venture capital and private equity in 2007 in a Geneva based private markets investment firm with $1.8 Billion in AUM. During this period, he gained experience in direct investing across early-stage and growth-stage venture capital, as well as direct private equity investments.

In 2008, he became one of the first European venture capitalists to attend Y-Combinator, prior to the launch of Airbnb, and years before Sam Altman became its President.

In January 2016, with his colleague and long-time friend Christopher Kile, he created Zeno Ventures and Zeno Partners, both based in Geneva, with offices in Zurich and in San Francisco.

As of 2026, Zeno manages 6 investment funds and controls billions in assets invested across 100 companies.

In 2019, he became a director of an industrial group founded in Portugal in 1986, before becoming Chairman of the Board of Directors between 2020 and 2024.

In July 2022, he became the Chairman of the Board of Directors of a Swiss financial group with 10 billion in assets under management. He is also a director of a real estate investment company in Switzerland of 1.9 billion in assets under management. Previously, he was the Chairman of the Board of Directors of a Swiss bank.

In December 2023, he was featured in Bloomberg as his firm Zeno Partners was believed to have formulated a EUR 6bn offer for Altice Portugal together with Warburg Pincus.

== Personal life ==
Duarte Moreira is married and has two children. He currently resides with his family in Geneva, Switzerland. He enjoys playing chess and tennis.

== Others ==
In 2023, 2024 and 2026, he participated in the 69^{th}, 70^{th}, and 72^{nd} Bilderberg Meetings. Since the first meeting of the Bilderberg group in 1954 he is among the youngest Portuguese or Swiss to have ever participated in the meeting.
