= Western values (disambiguation) =

Western values are a set of values strongly associated with the West.

Western values may also refer to:

- ethics in Western philosophy
- political neologism, see European values

== See also ==
- Value (ethics)
- Values (Western philosophy)
- East–West dichotomy
- History of Western civilization
- Western World (disambiguation)
