= Westworld (disambiguation) =

Westworld is a science fiction media franchise created by Michael Crichton.

Westworld may also refer to:

== Film and television ==
- Westworld (film), a 1973 film by Michael Crichton, which inspired the franchise
- Westworld (TV series), 2016 HBO television series based on the 1973 film
  - Westworld (soundtrack), soundtrack to the television series

== Music ==
- Westworld (American band), a side project of Tony Harnell and others
- Westworld (British band), a British rock band active in the late 1980s
- Westworld (Theatre of Hate album), 1982

== Other uses ==
- WestWorld, a sports complex in Scottsdale, Arizona, United States
- Westworld (game), a 1990s role-playing play-by-mail game

== See also ==
- Westword
- Western World (disambiguation)
