= James Appathurai =

Canadian diplomat

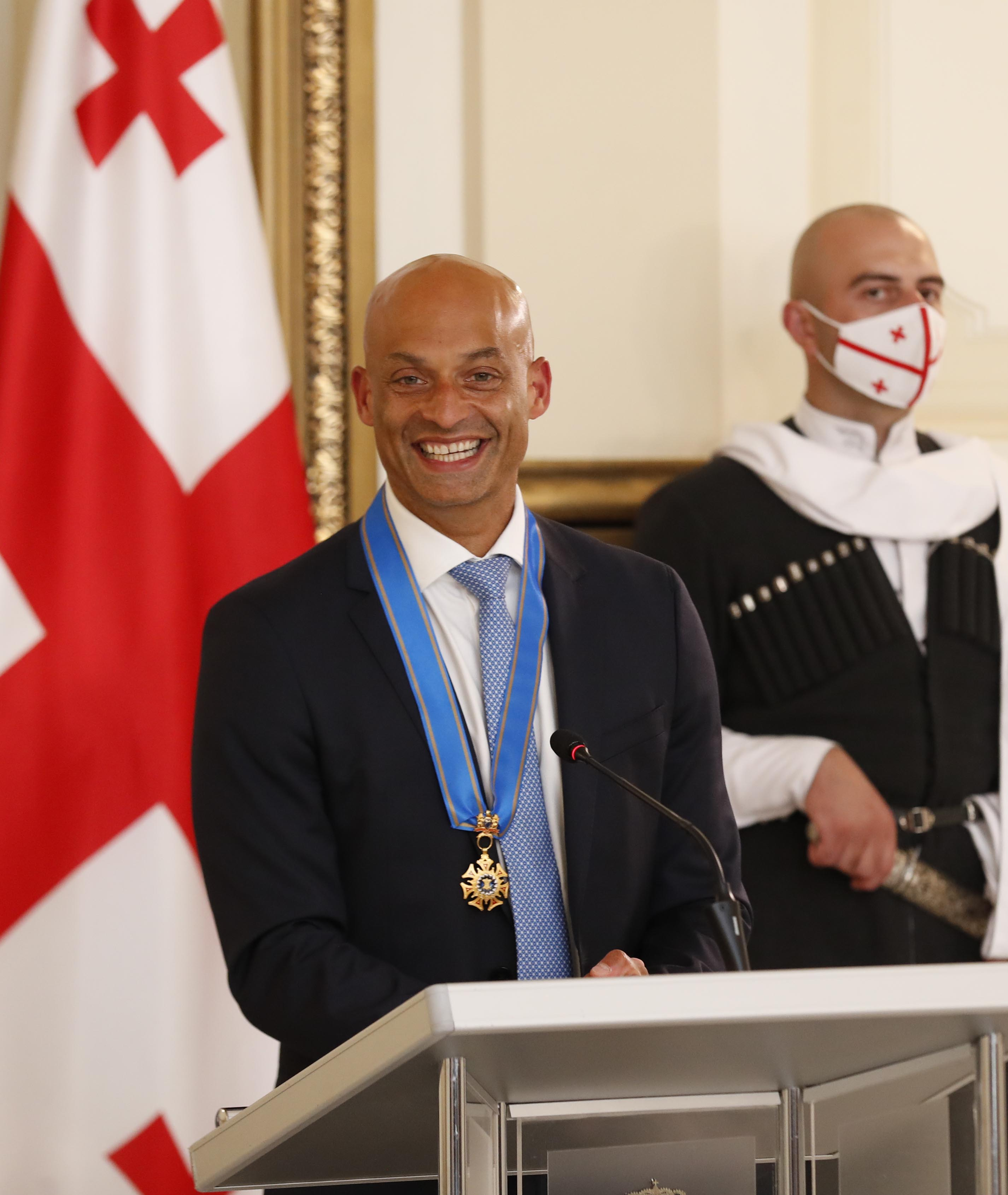
- Appathurai wearing the Order of the Golden Fleece in 2021
- Born: August 7, 1968 (age 58); Toronto, Ontario, Canada
- Education: University of Toronto (BA); University of Amsterdam (MAIR)
- Occupation: Diplomat

James Appathurai (born 7 August 1968, Toronto) is a Canadian diplomat and academic. He is the current NATO Deputy Assistant Secretary General for Innovation, Hybrid and Cyber, a position he was appointed to in September 2021.

Appathurai has worked for NATO since 1998 and was its spokesperson from 2004 to 2010. From December 2010 until April 2022, Appathurai was the Deputy Assistant Secretary General for Political Affairs and Security Policy. During this time, he took on the role of Special Representative for the Caucasus and Central Asia, and held discussions with the government of Georgia about potential NATO accession. In 2021, President of Georgia Salome Zurabishvili awarded Appathurai the Order of the Golden Fleece for his contribution to Georgia–NATO relations.

Appathurai was one of three NATO representatives at the 2024 Bilderberg Conference, an annual exclusive gathering of the European and North American political and business elite.
