= Uggerby Å =

River in Denmark

Coordinates: 57°35′N 10°8′E

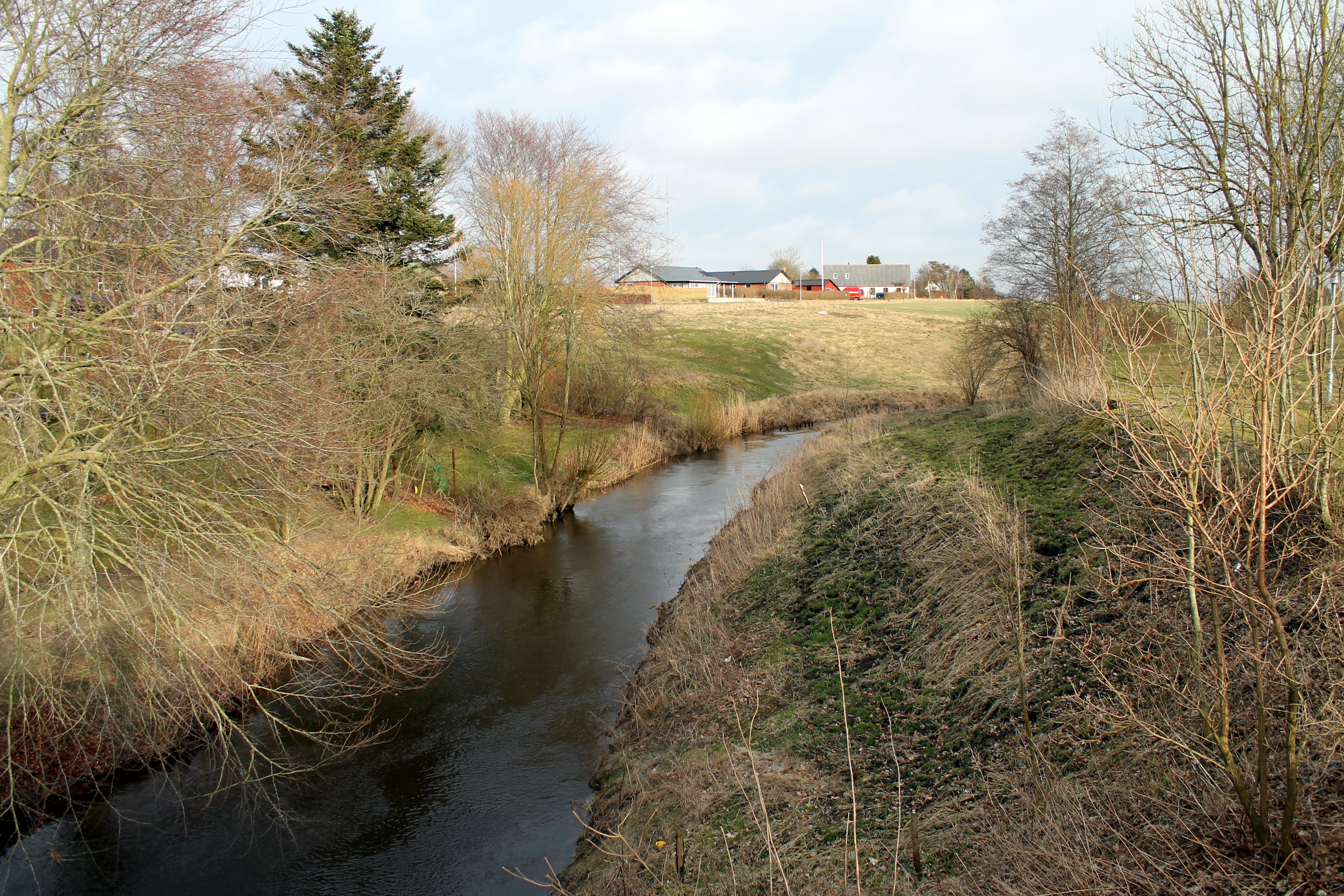
Uggerby River

The Uggerby Å (Uggerby River) is a river in northern Denmark; it is the chief river in Vendsyssel. The river is over 50 kilometres (31 mi) long. It rises in Sterup (south of Hjørring) and empties into Skagerrak. In the river, there is a large stock of sea trout, brook trout, eel, shellfish and pike. The association has approximately 50 km of fishing spots right by the river.
