= Eurostars Hotel Company =

Spanish multinational hotel chain

Eurostars Hotels
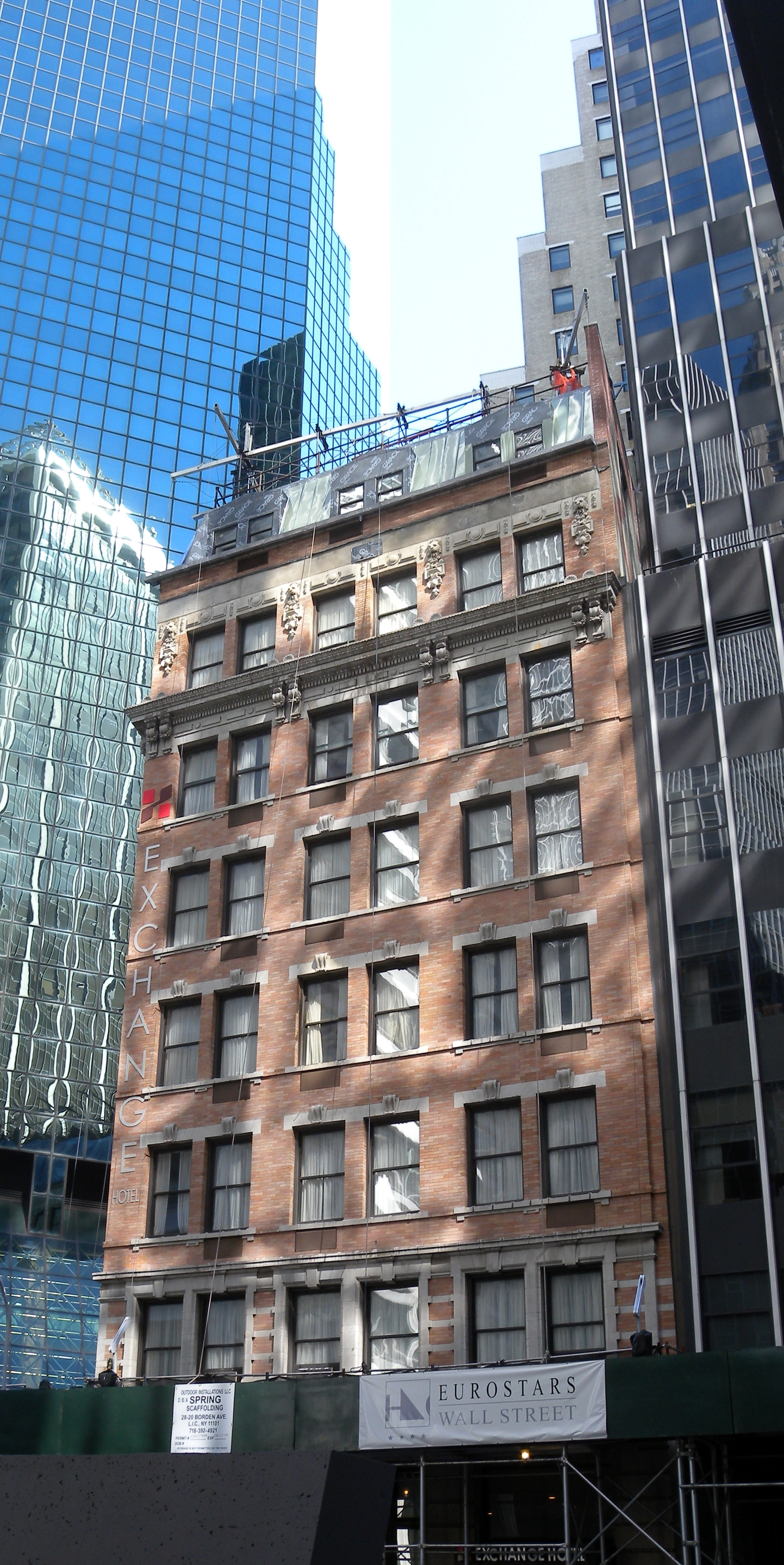
- Eurostars Wall Street
- Company type: Private
- Industry: Hotel
- Founded: 2005
- Headquarters: Barcelona, Spain
- Key people: Amancio López-Seijas
- Products: Temporary residence
- Parent: Hotusa
- Website: Eurostars Hotels

Eurostars Hotels is a hotel chain based in Barcelona, Spain, fully owned by The Hotusa Group. Eurostars Hotels has 251 properties worldwide as of 2023.

== History ==
Eurostars Hotels was formed in 2005 by the Barcelona-based Hotusa Group to provide accommodation for travellers to and within Europe. The company quickly grew beyond Europe to Mexico, Argentina and purchased two four-star boutique hotels in New York City.

In April 2007, Eurostars Hotels acquired the Dylan Hotel in New York. In July 2008, the group purchased a minority stake in a hotel in Venice, the Residenza Cannaregio. In January 2009, Eurostars opened a 31-floor hotel in the Torre Sacyr Vallehermoso in Madrid, its second location in the city. In December 2010, Eurostars opened its 100th directly managed hotel in the San Lázaro area of Santiago de Compostela

In April 2011, Eurostars Hotels launched a 5-star location in Berlin. In July 2016, Eurostars opened its first hotel in Africa, in Morocco. In October 2016, Eurostars Hotels launched in Colombia and in Ecuador in October 2017.

In March 2019, Eurostars Hotels tested the presence of a robot in a hotel lobby in Barcelona (Eurostars Grand Marina) that greets customers and caters to their needs. In October 2019, Hotusa acquired the Langford Hotel in Miami and turned it into a Eurostars Hotel.

== Description ==
Eurostars Hotels is a chain of hotels based in Barcelona, Spain, and owned by the hospitality group Hotusa.
