= Western World (British ship) =

C. 1850s British sailing ship

Coordinates: 40°09′06″N 74°01′10″W

History
- Fate: Wrecked on 22 October 1853

General characteristics
- Length: 180 ft (55 m)

Western World was a British sailing ship, used on the New York-Liverpool route in the mid 1800s. She was wrecked on 22 October 1853 off the coast of New Jersey.

== Design ==
Western World was a three-masted vessel, 180 feet (55 m) in length.

== Wreck ==
On 22 October 1853, Western World, while departing New York carrying 300 passengers and a cargo of china, powder flasks, and consumer goods, ran aground in a heavy fog off Spring Lake, New Jersey. All of her passengers and crew were rescued. Attempts to save the vessel using the steam tug Achilles were unsuccessful, and Western World broke apart over the next few days, finally sinking completely on 26 October.

== Discovery of the wreck ==
In the early 1960s, the wreck, originally known as the Spring Lake Wreck, was discovered by divers Charlie Stratton and Howard Rowland; in 1962 Ed Maliszewskire recovered the ship's capstan cover, identifying the wreck. In the early 1970s diver John Mattera recovered a small bell also with the name Western World and began to research the shipwreck. Finding a story in a hundred year old periodical detailing the mysterious Spring Lake wreck and set about to attach the correct name to the shipwreck.

The wreck sits 100 yards (91 m) off the beach in 28 feet (8.5 m) of water. The ship is buried in the bottom, but currents occasionally expose it. The wreck is covered with pieces of china and metal objects embedded into the rock hard conglomerate. Diving from shore is possible, but prior permission from the Spring Lake Police department is required. Artifacts from the wreck are displayed in the Newark Museum.
