= Western World Insurance Group =

- Industry: Insurance
- Founded: 1964
- Headquarters: Parsippany, New Jersey, U.S.
- Products: General Liability, Commercial Auto, Professional Liability, Commercial Property
- Website: www.westernworld.com

Western World Insurance Group is an insurance provider founded in 1964. The company largely specializes in general liability, commercial property, commercial auto and professional liability insurance.

Located in Parsippany, New Jersey, Western World Insurance Group provides commercial insurance products through a nationwide network of wholesale agents and brokers within the E & S specialty lines industry.

== Coverage ==
General liability coverage include owners/contractors protective, products/completed operations, liquor law, and employee benefit liabilities; commercial property coverage comprise building, personal property, business income/extra expense, crime, inland marine, equipment breakdown, and bailees’ coverage; commercial auto coverage include auto and truckers general liabilities, auto physical damage, cargo, and in-tow coverage; and professional liability coverage comprise architects, engineers, directors, officers, public officials, non-profit and other professional liabilities, as well as educational errors and omissions, information technology errors and omissions, and other errors and omissions.

The company provides insurance coverage in the areas of amusement devices, apartments, athletic events, camps, clubs, condominium/homeowners associations, crane operators, equine risks, equipment rental, exercise and health, hospitality, hot air balloons, hotels, janitorial, manufacturers, outfitters and guides, pest control, schools, shopping centers, steel erection and fabrication, supermarkets, tanning salons, vacant land/buildings, community organizations, townhouses, commercial office buildings, contractors equipment, day care centers, professional offices, houses of worship, light industrial campuses, retail stores, social service facilities, restaurants, bars and taverns, trucks, fast food delivery, limousines, truckers, public autos, and social service agencies, as well as artisan, fire suppression, general, scaffold, and cement mixer contractors.

== Technology ==
Western World makes significant investments in technology. Western World Integrated Platform aims to "speed distributors interaction and eliminate rekeying." Western World's Integrated Platform, built in .NET Framework in 2008 is built to help agents with underwriting, rating, quoting and binding. In July 2010, Western World brought its integrated platform to mobile devices.

== Affiliations ==
A.M. Best Company, The National Association of Professional Surplus Lines Offices, Ltd., Property Casualty Insurers Association of America, The Professional Liability Underwriting Society, The American Association of Managing General Agents, The Target Markets Program Administrators Association.
