= List of companies listed on the Oslo Stock Exchange =

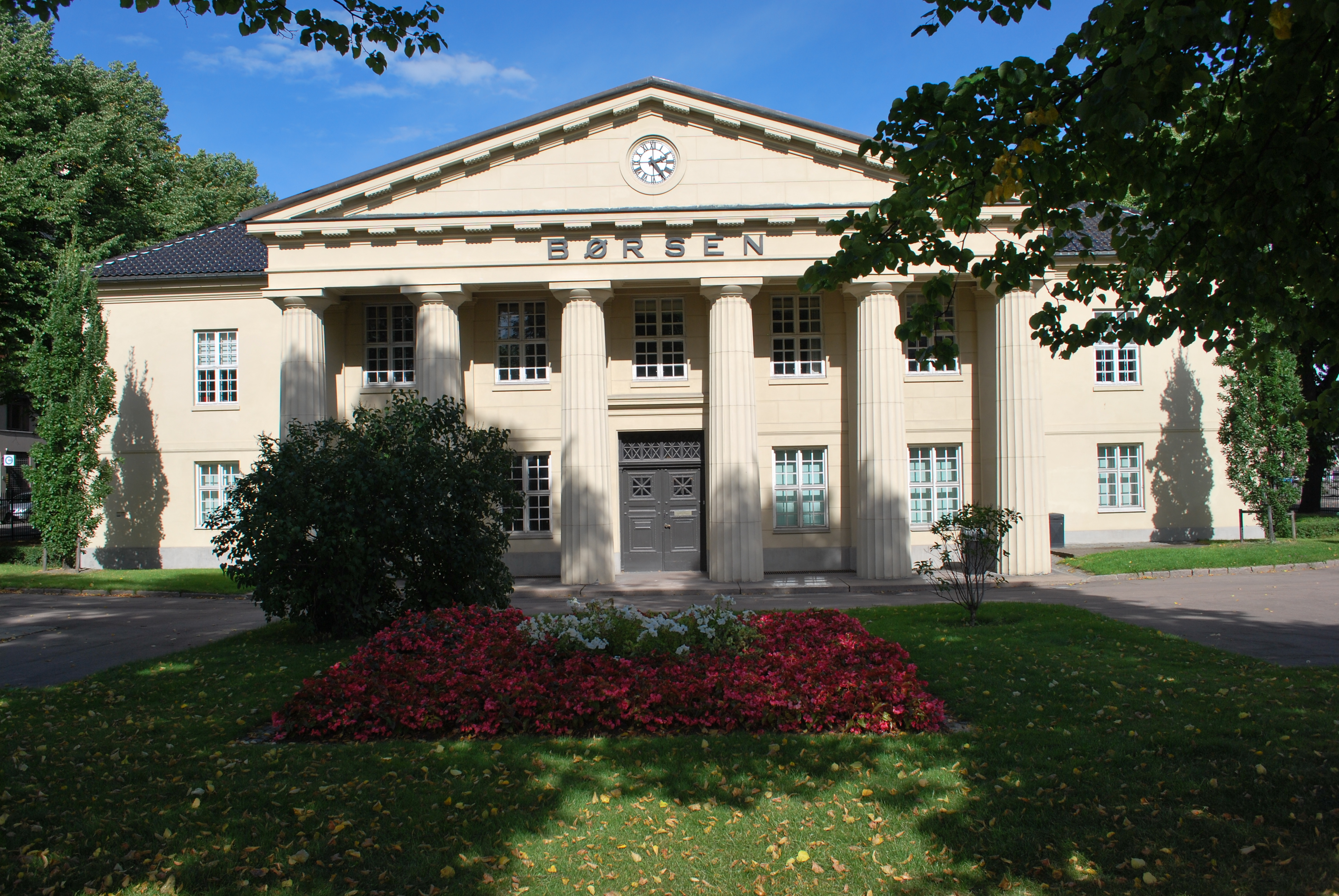
The south wall of the stock exchange in Oslo

The Oslo Stock Exchange (Norwegian: Oslo Børs) serves as the main market for trading in the shares of Norwegian companies. It opens at 9:00am and closes 4:30pm local time (CET). In addition to a wide range of domestic companies, the OSE attracts a lot of international companies within petroleum, shipping and other related areas.

The stock exchanged opened in April 1819 (as Christiania Børs), but didn't list stocks and shares until 1 March 1881. The first list of prices showed 23 shares. From 1920 to 1936, whaling shares accounted for about 50% of total turnover.

In addition to Norwegian and foreign companies with shares listed on Oslo Stock Exchange, the list also includes equity certificates issued by Norwegian savings banks. The difference between shares and equity certificates is connected to the ownership of the company's assets and leverage in the administrative bodies of the banks.

== Currently listed companies ==
*	Denotes equity certificate issued by savings bank

Company	Ticker	First day of listing	GICS Industry
ABG Sundal Collier	OSE: ABG	4 July 1991	Investment Banking & Brokerage
AF Group	OSE: AFG	8 September 1997	Construction & Engineering
Akastor	OSE: AKA	2 April 2004	Oil & Gas Equipment & Services
Aker	OSE: AKER	8 September 2004	Multi-Sector Holdings
Aker BP	OSE: AKERBP	23 December 2009	Oil & Gas Exploration & Production
Aker Solutions	OSE: AKSO	29 September 2014	Oil & Gas Equipment & Services
AKVA Group	OSE: AKVA	10 November 2006	Industrial Machinery
American Shipping Company	OSE: AMSC	11 July 2005	Marine
Carasent	OSE: CARA	8 April 2002	Application Software
Aqualis	OSE: AQUA	13 August 2014	Oil & Gas Equipment & Services
Archer	OSE: ARCHER	26 November 2010	Oil & Gas Drilling
Arcus	OSE: ARCUS	1 December 2016	Distillers & Vintners
Arendals Fossekompani	OSE: AFK	15 July 1991	Independent Power Producers & Energy Traders
Asetek	OSE: ASETEK	20 March 2013	Technology Hardware, Storage & Peripherals
Atea	OSE: ATEA	28 March 1985	IT Consulting & Other Services
Atlantic Petroleum	OSE: ATLA-NOK	12 December 2013	Oil & Gas Exploration & Production
Aurskog Sparebank*	OSE: AURG	12 August 1998	Regional Banks
Austevoll Seafood	OSE: AUSS	11 October 2006	Packaged Foods & Meats
Avance Gas Holding	OSE: AVANCE	15 April 2014	Oil & Gas Storage & Transportation
Awilco Drilling	OSE: AWDR	4 September 2018	Oil & Gas Drilling
Axactor	OSE: ACR	21 November 1997	Specialized Finance
B2Impact	OSE: B2I	8 June 2016	Specialized Finance
Bakkafrost	OSE: BAKKA	26 March 2010	Packaged Foods & Meats
Belships	OSE: BEL	2 January 1939	Marine
Endúr	OSE: ENDUR	30 June 2008	Industrial Conglomerates
BerGenBio	OSE: BGBIO	7 April 2017	Biotechnology
Biotec Pharmacon	OSE: BIOTEC	4 November 2005	Biotechnology
Bonheur	OSE: BON	2 January 1920	Industrial Conglomerates
Borgestad	OSE: BOR	2 January 1920	Real Estate Operating Companies
Borr Drilling	OSE: BDRILL	30 August 2017	Oil and Gas Drilling
Borregaard	OSE: BRG	18 October 2012	Specialty Chemicals
Bouvet ASA	OSE: BOUVET	30 November 2010	IT Consulting & Other Services
BW LPG	OSE: BWLPG	21 November 2013	Oil & Gas Storage & Transportation
BW Offshore Limited	OSE: BWO	31 May 2006	Oil & Gas Storage & Transportation
Byggma	OSE: BMA	27 August 1997	Building Products
ContextVision	OSE: COV	17 March 1997	Health Care Technology
Crayon Group Holding	OSE: CRAYON	8 November 2017	System Software
Data Respons	OSE: DAT	1 December 1997	IT Consulting & Other Services
DNB ASA	OSE: DNB	17 August 1992	Diversified Banks
DNO International	OSE: DNO	16 November 1981	Oil & Gas Exploration & Production
DOF ASA	OSE: DOF	4 October 2000	Oil & Gas Equipment & Services
Eidesvik Offshore	OSE: EIOF	27 June 2005	Oil & Gas Equipment & Services
Elkem	OSE: ELK	22 March 2018	Specialty Chemicals
Electromagnetic Geoservices	OSE: EMGS	30 March 2007	Oil & Gas Equipment & Services
Entra	OSE: ENTRA	17 October 2014	Real Estate Operating Companies
Equinor	OSE: EQNR	18 June 2001	Integrated Oil & Gas
Europris	OSE: EPR	19 June 2015	General Merchandise Stores
Evry	OSE: EVRY	21 June 2017	IT Consulting & Other Services
Fjord1	OSE: FJORD	15 August 2017	Marine
Fjordkraft Holding	OSE: FKRAFT	21 March 2018	Electric Utilities
FLEX LNG	OSE: FLNG	18 July 2017	Oil & Gas Storage & Transportation
Frontline Ltd.	OSE: FRO	9 November 1998	Marine
Funcom	OSE: FUNCOM	13 December 2005	Home Entertainment Software
Gaming Innovation Group	OSE: GIG	27 January 2005	Internet Software & Services
GC Rieber Shipping	OSE: RISH	9 March 2005	Oil & Gas Equipment & Services
Gjensidige Forsikring	OSE: GJF	10 December 2010	Multi-line Insurance
Golden Ocean Group	OSE: GOGL	1 April 2015	Marine
Goodtech	OSE: GOD	20 January 1984	Industrial Machinery
Grieg Seafood	OSE: GSF	21 June 2007	Packaged Foods & Meats
Gyldendal ASA	OSE: GYL	2 January 1980	Publishing
Höegh LNG Holdings	OSE: HLNG	5 July 2011	Oil & Gas Storage & Transportation
Havila Shipping	OSE: HAVI	24 May 2005	Oil & Gas Equipment & Services
Havyard Group	OSE: HYARD	1 July 2014	Construction Machinery & Heavy Trucks
Helgeland Sparebank*	OSE: HELG	3 February 2000	Regional Banks
Hexagon Composites	OSE: HEX	30 January 1997	Metal & Glass Containers
Hiddn Solutions	OSE: HIDDN	16 July 2001	Technology Hardware, Storage & Peripherals
Høland og Setskog Sparebank*	OSE: HSPG	17 August 1999	Regional Banks
IDEX ASA	OSE: IDEX	11 May 2015	Electronic Equipment & Instruments
Incus Investor	OSE: INC	4 December 1995	Industrial Conglomerates
Infront	OSE: INFRNT	29 September 2017	Financial Exchanges & Data
InterOil Exploration and Production	OSE: IOX	19 July 2006	Integrated Oil & Gas
Sogn Sparebank	OSE: SOGN	20 January 1997	Regional Banks
Itera	OSE: ITE	27 January 1999	IT Consulting & Other Services
Jinhui Shipping and Transport	OSE: JIN	24 October 1994	Marine
Jæren Sparebank*	OSE: JAEREN	3 May 2007	Regional Banks
Kid	OSE: KID	2 November 2015	Homefurnishing Retail
Kitron	OSE: KIT	16 January 1998	Electronic Manufacturing Services
Morrow Bank ASA	OSE: MOBA	10 November 2017	Consumer Finance
Kongsberg Automotive	OSE: KOA	24 June 2005	Auto Parts & Equipment
Kongsberg Gruppen	OSE: KOG	13 December 1993	Aerospace & Defence
Kværner	OSE: KVAER	8 July 2011	Oil & Gas Equipment & Services
Lerøy Seafood Group	OSE: LSG	3 June 2002	Packaged Foods & Meats
Magseis	OSE: MSEIS	1 June 2018	Oil & Gas Equipment & Services
Mowi	OSE: MOWI	1 July 1997	Packaged Foods & Meats
Medistim	OSE: MEDI	28 May 2004	Health Care Equipment
Melhus Sparebank*	OSE: MELG	9 November 1998	Regional Banks
Multiconsult	OSE: MULTI	22 May 2015	Research & Consulting Services
Napatech	OSE: NAPA	6 December 2013	Technology Hardware, Storage & Peripherals
Navamedic	OSE: NAVA	31 March 2006	Pharmaceuticals
NEL Hydrogen	OSE: NEL	27 August 2004	Industrial Machinery
NEXT Biometrics Group	OSE: NEXT	17 December 2015	Electronic Equipment & Instruments
Norconsult ASA	OSE: NORCO	10 November 2023	Construction & Engineering
Northern Drilling	OSE: NODL	26 October 2007	Oil & Gas Drilling
MPC Container Ships	OSE: MPCC	3 May 2018	Marine
Nordic Nanovector	OSE: NANO	23 March 2015	Biotechnology
Nordic Semiconductor	OSE: NOD	25 April 1996	Semiconductors
Norsk Hydro	OSE: NHY	16 April 1909	Aluminium
Norway Royal Salmon	OSE: NRS	29 March 2011	Packaged Foods & Meats
Norwegian Air Shuttle	OSE: NAS	18 December 2003	Airlines
Norwegian Energy Company	OSE: NOR	9 November 2007	Oil & Gas Exploration & Production
Norwegian Finans Holding	OSE: NOFI	17 June 2016	Consumer Finance
Norwegian Property	OSE: NPRO	15 November 2006	Real Estate Operating Companies
NRC Group	OSE: NRC	11 January 1988	Construction & Engineering
NTS ASA	OSE: NTS	1 April 1992	Marine
Ocean Yield	OSE: OCY	5 July 2013	Oil & Gas Storage & Transportation
Oceanteam Shipping	OSE: OTS	8 February 2007	Oil & Gas Storage & Transportation
Odfjell Drilling	OSE: ODL	27 September 2013	Oil & Gas Drilling
Odfjell ser. A	OSE: ODF	5 May 1986	Marine
Odfjell ser. B	OSE: ODFB	11 May 1989	Marine
Olav Thon Eiendomsselskap	OSE: OLT	29 April 1983	Real Estate Operating Companies
Orkla Group	OSE: ORK	2 January 1934	Packaged Foods & Meats
Panoro Energy	OSE: PEN	8 June 2010	Oil & Gas Exploration & Production
Pareto Bank	OSE: PARB	12 December 2016	Diversified Banks
PCI Biotech Holding	OSE: PCIB	27 April 2018	Pharmaceuticals
Pexip ASA	OSE: PEXIP	14 May 2020	Software & Services
Petroleum Geo-Services	OSE: PGS	26 August 1992	Oil & Gas Equipment & Services
Petrolia	OSE: PSE	12 May 1997	Integrated Oil & Gas
Photocure	OSE: PHO	29 May 2000	Pharmaceuticals
Polarcus	OSE: PLCS	20 June 2012	Oil & Gas Equipment & Services
Polaris Media	OSE: POL	20 October 2008	Publishing
poLight	OSE: PLT	1 October 2018	Technology Hardware, Storage & Peripherals
Prosafe	OSE: PRS	23 April 1997	Oil & Gas Equipment & Services
Protector Forsikring	OSE: PROTCT	25 May 2007	Property & Casualty Insurance
Q-Free	OSE: QFR	3 April 2002	Technology Hardware, Storage & Peripherals
Questerre Energy Corporation	OSE: QEC	17 June 2005	Integrated Oil & Gas
RAK Petroleum	OSE: RAKP	7 November 2014	Oil & Gas Exploration & Production
Reach Subsea	OSE: REACH	2 January 1920	Oil & Gas Equipment & Services
REC Silicon	OSE: REC	9 May 2006	Semiconductors
SalMar	OSE: SALM	8 May 2007	Packaged Foods & Meats
Salmones Camanchaca	OSE: SALMON	2 February 2018	Packaged Foods & Meats
Sandnes Sparebank*	OSE: SADG	27 October 1995	Regional Banks
SAS Group	OSE: SAS-NOK	21 February 1997	Airlines
SATS	OSE: SATS	23 October 2019	Consumer Cyclical
Sbanken	OSE: SBANK	2 November 2015	Diversified Banks
Scatec	OSE: SCATC	2 October 2014	Renewable Electricity
Schibsted ser. A	OSE: SCHA	15 July 1992	Publishing
Schibsted ser. B	OSE: SCHB	1 June 2015	Publishing
The Scottish Salmon Company	OSE: SSC	29 April 2011	Packaged Foods & Meats
S.D. Standard Drilling	OSE: SDSD	31 May 2017	Oil & Gas Drilling
SeaBird Exploration	OSE: SBX	11 April 2006	Oil & Gas Exploration & Production
Seadrill	OSE: SDRL	22 November 2005	Oil & Gas Drilling
Self Storage Group	OSE: SSG	27 October 2017	Diversified Support Services
Selvaag Bolig	OSE: SBO	14 June 2012	Homebuilding
Shelf Drilling	OSE: SHLF	25 June 2018	Oil & Gas Drilling
Siem Offshore	OSE: SIOFF	12 August 2005	Oil & Gas Equipment & Services
Skue Sparebank*	OSE: SKUE	19 October 1998	Regional Banks
Solon Eiendom	OSE: SOLON	5 May 2000	Homebuilding
Solstad Farstad	OSE: SOFF	27 October 1997	Oil & Gas Equipment & Services
SpareBank 1 BV*	OSE: SBVG	27 May 1994	Regional Banks
SpareBank 1 Nord–Norge*	OSE: NONG	2 May 1994	Regional Banks
SpareBank 1 Nøtterøy–Tønsberg*	OSE: SBTE	3 October 2018	Regional Banks
SpareBank 1 Ringerike Hadeland*	OSE: RING	13 June 1996	Regional Banks
SpareBank 1 SMN*	OSE: MING	2 May 1994	Regional Banks
SpareBank 1 SR-Bank	OSE: SRBANK	2 January 2012	Regional Banks
SpareBank 1 Nordvest*	OSE: SBTE	3 October 2017	Regional Banks
SpareBank 1 Østfold Akershus*	OSE: SOAG	1 November 2005	Regional Banks
SpareBank 1 Østlandet*	OSE: SPOL	13 June 2017	Regional Banks
Sparebanken Møre*	OSE: MORG	12 June 1989	Regional Banks
Sparebanken Sør*	OSE: SOR	14 July 1998	Regional Banks
Sparebanken Vest*	OSE: SVEG	4 January 1995	Regional Banks
Sparebanken Øst*	OSE: SPOG	22 February 1989	Regional Banks
Star Bulk Carriers	OSE: SBLK	16 July 2018	Marine
Stolt-Nielsen	OSE: SNI	7 March 2001	Marine
Storebrand	OSE: STB	21 June 1993	Life & Health Insurance
Storm Real Estate	OSE: STORM	6 July 2010	Real Estate Operating Companies
StrongPoint	OSE: STRONG	11 June 2001	Technology Hardware, Storage & Peripherals
Subsea 7	OSE: SUBC	5 June 1997	Oil & Gas Exploration & Production
Targovax	OSE: TRVX	23 March 2017	Biotechnology
Team Tankers International	OSE: TEAM	9 March 2015	Marine
Telenor	OSE: TEL	4 December 2000	Integrated Telecommunication Services
TGS-NOPEC Geophysical Company	OSE: TGS	30 October 1997	Oil & Gas Equipment & Services
Thin Film Electronics ASA	OSE: THIN	27 February 2015	Technology Hardware, Storage & Peripherals
Tomra Systems	OSE: TOM	18 January 1985	Environmental & Facilities Services
Totens Sparebank*	OSE: TOTG	18 December 1995	Regional Banks
Treasure ASA	OSE: TRE	8 June 2016	Marine
Veidekke	OSE: VEI	23 June 1986	Construction & Engineering
Vistin Pharma	OSE: VISTIN	3 October 2018	Pharmaceuticals
Volue	OSE: VOLUE	4 May 2021	Computer Software
Voss Veksel- og Landmandsbank	OSE: VVL	1 April 1992	Regional Banks
Webstep	OSE: WSTEP	11 October 2017	IT Consulting & Other Services
Wilh. Wilhelmsen Holding ser. A	OSE: WWI	2 January 1980	Marine
Wilh. Wilhelmsen Holding ser. B	OSE: WWIB	7 August 1989	Marine
Wilson	OSE: WILS	17 March 2005	Marine
XXL	OSE: XXL	3 October 2014	Specialty Stores
Yara International	OSE: YAR	25 March 2004	Fertilizer & Agricultural Chemicals
Zalaris	OSE: ZAL	20 June 2014	Human Resource & Employment Services

== See also ==
- List of companies listed on Oslo Axess
- Oslo Stock Exchange
- OSEAX
- OBX Index
