= OSEAX =

- Operator: Oslo Stock Exchange
- Exchanges: Oslo Stock Exchange
- Constituents: All
- Type: All
- Market cap: NOK 1.55 billion (Nov 2010)
- Related indices: OBX
- Website: OSEAX Prices

The Oslo Børs All Share Index (OSEAX) consists of all shares listed on Oslo Børs. The index is adjusted for corporate actions daily and the current outstanding number of shares is applied in the index. The OSEAX index is adjusted for dividend payments.

== Annual Returns ==
The following table shows the annual development of the OSEAX since 1983.

Year	Closing level	Change in index in points	Change in index in %
1983	27.02		
1984	33.48	6.46	23.91
1985	43.77	10.29	30.73
1986	39.88	−3.89	−8.89
1987	35.16	−4.72	−11.84
1988	48.43	13.27	37.74
1989	74.80	26.37	54.45
1990	64.73	−10.07	−13.46
1991	58.64	−6.09	−9.41
1992	52.77	−5.87	−10.01
1993	86.93	34.16	64.73
1994	93.13	6.20	7.13
1995	94.60	1.47	1.58
1996	125.27	30.67	32.42
1997	165.61	40.34	32.20
1998	120.92	−44.69	−26.99
1999	175.99	55.07	45.54
2000	190.71	14.72	8.36
2001	160.92	−29.79	−15.62
2002	120.33	−40.59	−25.22
2003	178.04	57.71	47.96
2004	247.57	69.53	39.05
2005	376.78	129.21	52.19
2006	502.38	125.60	33.34
2007	569.97	67.59	13.45
2008	270.20	−299.77	−52.59
2009	420.09	149.89	55.47
2010	486.48	66.39	15.80
2011	442.46	−44.02	−9.05
2012	490.52	48.06	10.86
2013	602.80	112.28	22.89
2014	619.74	16.94	2.81
2015	648.96	29.22	4.71
2016	764.66	115.70	17.83
2017	906.98	142.32	18.61
2018	902.30	−4.68	−0.52
2019	1,032.24	129.94	14.40
2020	1,047.59	15.35	1.49
2021	1,307.69	260.10	24.83
2022	1,362.68	54.99	4.21
2023	1,519.32	156.64	11.49
2024	1,644.83	125.51	8.26
2025	1,941.42	296.59	18.03

== Constituents ==
AS at 17 November 2010, the constituent companies of the OSEAX are:

Ticker	Name	Mkt Cap (Million NOK)
ACTA	Acta Holding	659.28
ACY	Acergy	24124.35
AFG	AF Gruppen	2840.85
AFK	Arendals Fossekompani	3538.59
AGR	AGR Group	1758.13
AIK	Aktiv Kapital	2076.69
AKBM	Aker BioMarine	1337.54
AKER	Aker	9263.02
AKFP	Aker Floating Production	82.5
AKS	Aker Seafoods	637.03
AKSO	Aker Solutions	23919.92
AKVA	AKVA Group	265.23
ALGETA	Algeta	4801.24
AMSC	American Shipping ...	124.2
APP	Apptix	283.38
ASC	ABG Sundal Collier	2873.2
ASD	Axis-Shield	1243.92
ATEA	Atea	4659.41
AUSS	Austevoll Seafood	8879.02
AVM	Avocet Mining	3344.47
BAKKA	Bakkafrost	2243.58
BEL	Belships	177.42
BERGEN	Bergen Group	527.41
BIONOR	Bionor Pharma	110.12
BIOTEC	Biotec Pharmacon	163.1
BIRD	Birdstep Technology	80.98
BLO	Blom	131.95
BMA	Byggma	281.68
BON	Bonheur	6179.58
BOR	Borgestad	405.65
BWG	BWG Homes	2053.97
BWO	BW Offshore Limited	8744.8
CECO	Camillo Eitzen & Co	455.01
CEQ	Cermaq	7399.65
CLAVIS	Clavis Pharma	925.7
COD	Codfarmers	70.29
COMROD	Comrod Communication	244.54
COP	Copeinca	3451.5
COV	ContextVision	138.49
DAT	Data Respons	497.33
DESSC	Deep Sea Supply	1446.25
DETNOR	Det norske oljeselskap	2966.67
DIAG	DiaGenic	170.25
DNB	DNB	126069.03
DNO	DNO International	7614.37
DOCK	Dockwise	3199.79
DOF	DOF	3914.63
DOLP	Dolphin Interconnect Solutions	20.14
DOM	Domstein	221.49
ECHEM	Eitzen Chemical	903.8
EDBASA	EDB ErgoGroup	2629.76
EIOF	Eidesvik Offshore	1079.37
EKO	Ekornes	5560.84
ELT	Eltek	1125.58
EMGS	Electromagnetic G ...	1352.37
EMS	Eitzen Maritime Services	214.83
EOC	EOC	831.05
FAIR	Fairstar Heavy Tr ...	867.21
FAKTOR	Faktor Eiendom	509.15
FAR	Farstad Shipping	5811
FARA	Fara	74.17
FBU	Fornebu Utvikling	1817.73
FOE	Fred. Olsen Energy	14889.55
FOP	Fred. Olsen Production	1095.43
FRO	Frontline	13056.87
FUNCOM	Funcom	221.26
GGG	Grenland Group	394.18
GOD	Goodtech	666.55
GOGL	Golden Ocean Group	3723.15
GOL	Golar LNG	5621.88
GRO	Ganger Rolf	4705.7
GRR	Green Reefers	175.73
GSF	Grieg Seafood	1920.59
GTB	GTB Invest	126.16
GYL	Gyldendal	772.59
HAVI	Havila Shipping	892.98
HEX	Hexagon Composites	1000.42
HNA	Hafslund ser. A	7675.95
HNB	Hafslund ser. B	5234.28
HRG	Hurtigruten	1700.86
IGE	IGE Resources	397.24
IGNIS	Ignis	292.42
IMAREX	Imarex	761.93
IMSK	I.M. Skaugen	907.47
INFRA	Infratek	1290.04
INM	Inmeta	249.39
IOX	InterOil Exploration and Production	599.45
ITE	Itera	238.89
ITX	Intex Resources	632.5
JIN	Jinhui Shipping a ...	1899.42
KIT	Kitron	415.11
KOA	Kongsberg Automot ...	1657.97
KOG	Kongsberg Gruppen	15847.59
KOM	Komplett	921.77
KVE	Kverneland	663.53
LSG	Lerøy Seafood Group	9021.7
MAMUT	Mamut	573.42
MEDI	Medi-Stim	430.32
MHG	Marine Harvest	21964.36
MIS	MARITIME INDUSTRI ...	559.91
MORPOL	Morpol	3346.52
NAM	Namsos Trafikkselskap	42.87
NAS	Norwegian Air Shuttle	3578.34
NAUR	Northland Resources	1572.9
NAVA	Navamedic	53.51
NEAS	NEAS	134.84
NEC	Norse Energy Corp.	666.31
NHY	Norsk Hydro	58843.01
NIO	Nio Security	93.96
NLPR	Northern Logistic ...	802.96
NOCC	Norwegian Car Car ...	330.93
NOD	Nordic Semiconductor	3577.22
NOF	Northern Offshore	2176.46
NOR	Norwegian Energy ...	3985.82
NORD	NorDiag	133.53
NPEL	Norway Pelagic	701.43
NPRO	Norwegian Property	4936.11
NSG	Norske Skogindustrier	2288.34
ODF	Odfjell ser. A	2351.66
ODFB	Odfjell ser. B	718.36
OLT	Olav Thon Eiendom	8675.29
OPERA	Opera Software	3390.48
OPU	Oceanteam	99.52
ORK	Orkla	56648.68
ORO	ORIGIO	451.87
PAR	PA Resources	3200.13
PDR	Petrolia Drilling	144.05
PEN	Panoro Energy	1183.7
PGS	Petroleum Geo-Ser ...	17130.26
PHO	Photocure	928.23
POL	Polaris Media	1197.99
PRON	Pronova BioPharma	2765.82
PROTCT	Protector Forsikring	875.4
PRS	Prosafe	8427.22
PSI	PSI Group	171.84
QEC	Questerre Energy ...	2028.29
QFR	Q-Free	982.03
RCL	Royal Caribbean C ...	51633.34
REC	Renewable Energy ...	16841.2
REPANT	Repant	72.28
RGT	Rocksource	577.55
RIE	Rieber & Søn	3161.37
RISH	GC Rieber Shipping	1244.37
RXT	Reservoir Explora ...	266.97
SALM	SalMar	5588
SAS NOK	SAS AB	6941.9
SBX	SeaBird Exploration	524.69
SCH	Schibsted	15661.18
SCI	Scana Industrier	1090.01
SDRL	Seadrill	76418.89
SEVAN	Sevan Marine	3237.96
SFR	Statoil Fuel & Retail	15600
SIMTRO	Simtronics	115.31
SIOFF	Siem Offshore	3720.07
SKI	Skiens Aktiemølle	574.1
SNI	Stolt-Nielsen	6503.26
SOFF	Solstad Offshore	3909
SOLV	Solvang	410.56
SONG	Songa Offshore	4499.73
SRI	Star Reefers Inc.	904.45
STB	Storebrand	17628.72
STL	Statoil	396463.83
STORM	Storm Real Estate	283.81
SUB	Subsea 7	19384.2
TECO	Teco Maritime	42.19
TEL	Telenor	154472.25
TELIO	Telio Holding	575
TGS	TGS-NOPEC Geophys ...	10975.12
TIDE	Tide	767.02
TOM	Tomra Systems	4832.18
TTS	TTS Group	574.39
VEI	Veidekke	6591.65
VIZ	Vizrt	1598.04
VVL	Voss Veksel- og L ...	232.59
WRL	Wentworth Resources	178.99
WWASA	Wilh. Wilhelmsen	7458
WWI	Wilh. Wilhelmsen ...	4727.96
WWIB	Wilh. Wilhelmsen ...	1619.81
YAR	Yara International	83428.89

== See also ==
- Oslo Stock Exchange
- List of companies listed on the Oslo Stock Exchange
- OBX
