= List of banks in Norway =

This contains a list of banks in Norway. There are three types of banks in Norway: commercial banks, savings banks (Norwegian: Sparebank), and branches of foreign banks.

== Commercial banks ==
| Bank | Website | Main office | Founded | Parent |
|---|---|---|---|---|
| Bank2 | | Oslo | 2005 | |
| Bank Norwegian | | Bærum | 2007 | NOBA Bank Group |
| BN Bank | | Trondheim | | |
| DNB Bank | | Oslo | 1822 | DNB ASA |
| Landkreditt Bank | | Oslo | 1915 | Landkreditt |
| Nordea | | Oslo | | Nordea |
| Santander Consumer Bank | | Bærum | | Banco Santander |
| Sbanken | | Bergen | 2000 | DNB Bank ASA |
| Pareto Bank | | Oslo | 2008 | |
| SEB Privatbanken | | Oslo | | Skandinaviska Enskilda Banken |
| Storebrand Bank | | Oslo | 1767 | Storebrand |
| Verdibanken | | Oslo | 2003 | |
| Vekselbanken | | Vossevangen | 1899 | |
| yA Bank | | Oslo | 2006 | |
| Instabank | | Oslo | 2016 | |

== Savings banks ==
| Bank | Website | Main office | Founded | Alliance |
|---|---|---|---|---|
| Agder Sparebank | | Arendal | 1884 | Eika |
| Askim & Spydeberg Sparebank | | Askim | 1888 | Eika |
| Aurskog Sparebank | | Aursmoen | 1846 | Eika |
| Berg Sparebank | | Halden | 1915 | Eika |
| Bien Sparebank | | Oslo | 1885 | Eika |
| Birkenes Sparebank | | Birkeland | 1859 | Eika |
| Bjugn Sparebank | | Bjugn | 1891 | Eika |
| Cultura Sparebank | | Oslo | 1997 | |
| DNB | | Oslo | 2003 | |
| Drangedal Sparebank | | Drangedal | 1936 | Eika |
| Eidsberg Sparebank | | Mysen | 1848 | Eika |
| Etnedal Sparebank | | Bruflat | 1909 | Eika |
| Evje og Hornnes Sparebank | | Evje | 1864 | Eika |
| Fana Sparebank | | Bergen | 1878 | |
| Flekkefjord Sparebank | | Flekkefjord | 1837 | |
| Gildeskål Sparebank | | Inndyr | 1883 | Eika |
| Grong Sparebank | | Medjå | 1862 | Eika |
| Grue Sparebank | | Kirkenær | 1862 | Eika |
| Haltdalen Sparebank | | Haltdalen | 1898 | Eika |
| Haugesund Sparebank | | Haugesund | 1928 | Eika |
| Hegra Sparebank | | Hegra | 1898 | Eika |
| Høland og Setskog Sparebank | | Bjørkelangen | 1849 | Eika |
| Jernbanepersonalets Sparebank | | Oslo | 2000 | Eika |
| Jæren Sparebank | | Bryne | 1923 | Eika |
| Kvinesdal Sparebank | | Liknes | 1870 | Eika |
| Lillesands Sparebank | | Lillesand | 1852 | |
| Luster Sparebank | | Gaupne | 1975 | |
| Marker Sparebank | | Ørje | 1957 | Eika |
| MelhusBanken | | Melhus | 1840 | Eika |
| Nidaros Sparebank | | Klæbu | 1858 | Eika |
| Odal Sparebank | | Sand | 1877 | Eika |
| Oppdalsbanken | | Oppdal | 1856 | Eika |
| Orkla Sparebank | | Orkanger | 1841 | Eika |
| Oslofjord Sparebank | | Oslo | 2003 | Eika |
| Rindal Sparebank | | Rindal | 1873 | Eika |
| Rogaland Sparebank | | Sandnes | 1876 | Eika |
| Romerike Sparebank | | Lillestrøm | 1887 | Eika |
| Romsdal Sparebank | | Elnesvågen | 1971 | Eika |
| RørosBanken | | Røros | 1842 | Eika |
| Selbu Sparebank | | Mebonden | 1859 | Eika |
| Skagerrak Sparebank | | Kragerø | 1849 | Eika |
| Skudenes & Aakra Sparebank | | Åkrehamn | 1876 | |
| Skue Sparebank | | Geilo | 1842 | Eika |
| Soknedal Sparebank | | Soknedal | 1885 | Eika |
| Sogn Sparebank | | Årdalstangen | 1846 | Eika |
| SpareBank 1 Gudbrandsdal | | Vinstra | 1971 | SpareBank 1 |
| SpareBank 1 Hallingdal Valdres | | Ål | 1869 | SpareBank 1 |
| Sparebank 1 Helgeland | | Mo i Rana | 1860 | SpareBank 1 |
| SpareBank 1 Lom og Skjåk | | Lom | 1873 | SpareBank 1 |
| SpareBank 1 Nord-Norge | | Tromsø | 1989 | SpareBank 1 |
| SpareBank 1 Nordmøre | | Kristiansund | 1835 | SpareBank 1 |
| SpareBank 1 Ringerike Hadeland | | Hønefoss | 1833 | SpareBank 1 |
| SpareBank 1 SMN | | Trondheim | 1823 | SpareBank 1 |
| SpareBank 1 SR-Bank | | Stavanger | 1839 | SpareBank 1 |
| SpareBank 1 Sørøst-Norge | | Sandefjord | 1841 | SpareBank 1 |
| SpareBank 1 Østfold Akershus | | Moss | 1971 | SpareBank 1 |
| SpareBank 1 Østlandet | | Hamar | 1988 | SpareBank 1 |
| Sparebank 68° Nord | | Leknes | 1899 | Eika |
| Sparebanken DIN | | Bø i Telemark | 1852 | Eika |
| Sparebanken Møre | | Ålesund | 1985 | |
| Sparebanken Narvik | | Narvik | 1903 | Eika |
| Sparebanken Sogn og Fjordane | | Førde | 1842 | |
| Sparebanken Sør | | Kristiansand | 1984 | |
| Sparebanken Vest | | Bergen | 1823 | |
| Sparebanken Øst | | Oslo | 1843 | |
| Spareskillingbanken | | Kristiansand | 1877 | |
| Stadsbygd Sparebank | | Rissa | 1892 | Eika |
| Strømmen Sparebank | | Strømmen | 1921 | Eika |
| Sunndal Sparebank | | Sunndalsøra | 1893 | Eika |
| Søgne og Greipstad Sparebank | | Tangvall | 1892 | |
| Tinn Sparebank | | Rjukan | 1958 | Eika |
| Tolga-Os Sparebank | | Tolga | 1864 | Eika |
| Totens Sparebank | | Lena | 1854 | Eika |
| Trøgstad Sparebank | | Skjønhaug | 1847 | Eika |
| Trøndelag Sparebank | | Brekstad | 1864 | Eika |
| Tysnes Sparebank | | Våge | 1863 | Eika |
| Valle Sparebank | | Valle | 1866 | Eika |
| Valdres Sparebank | | Slidre | 1861 | Eika |
| Voss Sparebank | | Vossevangen | 1843 | |
| Ørland Sparebank | | Brekstad | 1849 | Eika |
| Ørskog Sparebank | | Sjøholt | 1857 | Eika |
| Aasen Sparebank | | Levanger | 1862 | Eika |

== Foreign branches ==
| Bank | Website | Country | Location |
|---|---|---|---|
| Aktiv Kapital | | Norway | Oslo |
| BMW Financial Services | | Germany | Bærum |
| BNP Paribas | | France | Oslo |
| Carnegie Investment Bank | | Sweden | Oslo |
| Citibank | | United States | Oslo |
| Danske Bank | | Denmark | Oslo |
| DLL Group | | Netherlands | Bærum |
| DVB Bank | | Netherlands | Bergen |
| Ford Financial | | United States | Bærum |
| Forex Bank | | Sweden | Oslo |
| Fortis | | Netherlands | Oslo |
| GE Money Bank | | United States | Stavanger |
| GMAC Bank | | United States | Kjeller |
| Handelsbanken | | Sweden | Oslo |
| IBM Credit | | United States | Kolbotn |
| Nordnet | | Sweden | Oslo |
| Scania Finans | | Sweden | Oslo |
| Siemens Financial Services | | Germany | Oslo |
| Skandinaviska Enskilda Banken | | Sweden | Oslo |
| SVEA Finans | | Sweden | Trondheim |
| Swedbank | | Sweden | Oslo |
| Toyota Kreditbank | | Japan | Drammen |

== See also ==
- List of banks in Europe
