= Odfjell (disambiguation) =

Odfjell is a Norwegian company.

Odfjell may also refer to:

- Odfjell Drilling, international drilling, well service and engineering company
- Abraham Odfjell (1881–1960), Norwegian ship owner
