= Nel ASA =

Norwegian hydrogen fuel company

- Type: Allmennaksjeselskap
- Traded as: OSE: NEL
- Industry: Fuel Cell, Hydrogen Fuel
- Founded: 1927
- Headquarters: Oslo, Norway
- Key people: CEO Håkon Volldal
- Number of employees: 257 (2023)
- Website: nelhydrogen.com

Nel ASA is a Norwegian company founded in 1927 and based in Oslo. Nel is a global company providing solutions for the production, storage and distribution of hydrogen from renewable energy sources. Nel is listed in the OBX Index of the Oslo Stock Exchange. As of March 2020, the largest shareholder is Clearstream Banking S.A. with a stake of 44.81%.

== Group companies ==
Since 2015, the company has also included the Danish hydrogen filling station manufacturer H2 Logic, and since 2017 the American electrolysis specialist Proton On Site. Together with PowerCell Sweden and Hexagon Composite, Nel founded the Hyon joint venture in September 2017 with the aim of establishing fuel cell-powered vehicles in the maritime sector in particular.

Nel has been a member of the H2Bus consortium since June 2019. The target is the deployment of 1,000 hydrogen fuel cell buses in Europe.

== History ==
The company started in 1927. In 1940, the world's largest water electrolysis plant was built in Rjukan, Norway, with a total capacity of more than 30,000 Nm3/hour of hydrogen from hydropower. In 1988, Nel launched the world's first electrolyzer to offer asbestos-free alkaline electrolysers. H2 Logic A/S, subsidiary of NEL ASA, has executed a binding technology transfer agreement with Mitsubishi Kakoki Kaisha, Ltd. (MKK), member of the Mitsubishi Group companies, in 2015. Nel will set up at least 20 hydrogen refuelling stations in Norway by 2020.

Nel is currently involved in several projects worldwide, including the commissioning of the first hydrogen-powered train in Germany as part of the H2 West Coast Consortium. In February 2019, it became known that a framework agreement for Switzerland had been concluded with Hyundai Motor Company for the supply of 60 - 80 MW of a total of 1,000 expected trucks in the first phase and hydrogen required for other applications. In Australia, NEL is involved in a power-to-gas (solar power to hydrogen) project.

Another major project is planned in partnership with the American start-up Nikola Motor Company, a manufacturer of hydrogen-powered trucks. In the coming years, the company plans to set up or expand a hydrogen infrastructure (filling stations and electrolysers) in the United States.

A cooperation agreement with Yara International was announced in August 2019. This is a fertiliser project for agriculture. NEL contributes its self-developed pressurized alkaline electrolyzer, which, with the help of electric current, produces a chemical reaction, a material conversion, which is needed for fertilizer production.

Nel ASA subsidiary Nel Hydrogen Fueling received an order from the "Touraine Vallée de l'Indre" urban community in France in 2021 to supply an H2Station™ hydrogen refueling station. The total value of the order is approximately one million euros.

Nine months after the passing of the Inflation Reduction Act the company announced plans to construct a manufacturing plant in Michigan to draw benefits from the measure and other general and state government benefits.
