= Vardia Insurance Group =

Norwegian insurance company

Vardia Insurance Group ASA
- Formerly: Scandinavian Insurance Group
- Company type: Allmennaksjeselskap
- Traded as: OSE: VARDIA
- Industry: Financial services
- Founded: 2009
- Headquarters: Oslo, Norway
- Products: Non-life insurance
- Number of employees: approx. 400
- Website: www.vardia.com

Vardia Insurance Group is a Norwegian insurance company, headquartered in Oslo, Norway. The company has operations in Norway, Sweden and Denmark. The company was listed on the Oslo Stock Exchange in 2014.

== Companies ==
- Vardia Forsikring AS (Norway): Sortland (Headquarters), Hamar, Oslo, Molde, Porsgrunn
- Vardia Försäkring AB (Sweden): Stockholm (Headquarters), Luleå, Skellefteå, Sundsvall
- Vardia Forsikringsagentur A/S (Denmark): Copenhagen
- Vardia Agencies AS (Norway): Oslo
- Saga Forsikring AS (Norway): Lysaker
- Rein Forsikring AS (Norway): Oslo
