= Badger Explorer =

Norwegian company in Norway

Badger Explorer ASA
- Company type: Allmennaksjeselskap
- Traded as: OSE: BXPL
- Founded: 2003
- Defunct: 2017
- Headquarters: Stavanger, Norway
- Key people: Kjell Erik Drevdal (CEO, 2005–Oct 2011); David Blacklaw (CEO, Oct 2011–Sep 2013); Steinar Bakke (CEO, Oct 2013–Jan 2016); Øystein Larsen (CEO, Jan 2016–Aug 2016); Roald Valen (CEO, Aug 2016–Apr 2017); Vegard Urnes (Hunter Group ASA; CEO, May 2017–Mar 2018)

Badger Explorer ASA (OSE: BXPL) was a Norwegian company headquartered in Stavanger, Norway. It developed a technology used to explore and map the extent of hydrocarbon resource and reserve base and provide long-term monitoring. Badger Explorer ASA was listed on the Oslo stock exchange in 2007 and has new ticker from May 2017. In 2018 the company changed name to Hunter Group ASA.

== Technology ==
The technology is based on an invention of the researcher at International Research Institute of Stavanger (IRIS). The invention was granted a patent in 2002 (Norway) and 2006 (USA). The Badger tool drills into the subsurface without a rig and buries itself. It carries an electrically powered drilling system and sensors, which continuously record data, producing logs while drilling, and providing continuous, long-term data in surveillance mode. The tool connects to the surface by a power and communication cable, which are initially spooled inside the tool and gradually released in the course of advancing.

Named after the company, the badger tool is essentially a 100-ft-long bottom-hole-assembly package that is designed to reach subsurface depths of 3000 m. [...] The entire exploration program could be done by a service vessel used to launch the tool, or probably several tools to form an array. The badger is then guided down and locked into its drilling position by a remotely operated vehicle. Each tool will be installed with various logging and sonar systems to analyze geological conditions and monitor the prospective reservoir. [...] Tethering the tool to the outside world is a combined power and fiber-optic cable that will spool out of the back end connect to a seabed manifold that provides power. [...] The data will be streamed beyond the manifold and up to a satellite buoy to enable operators to monitor and readjust its drilling parameters.

— Trent Jacobs, " Breaking from the Norm to Reach Marginal Offshore Fields", Journal of Petroleum Technology (2016)
