= Eqology =

Norwegian multi-level marketing company

Eqology AS
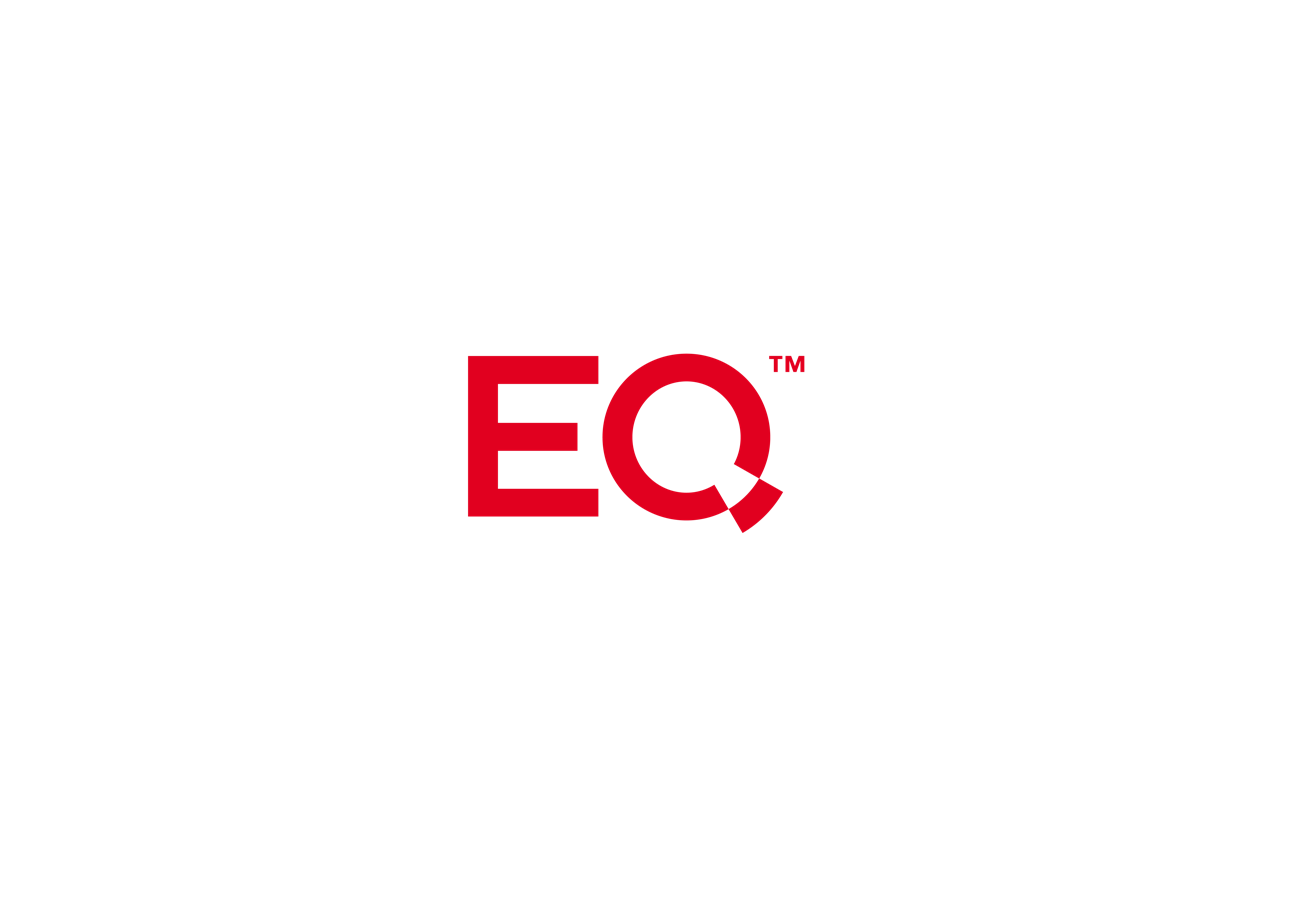
- Company type: Aksjeselskap
- Industry: Multi-level marketing (dietary supplements, skincare products)
- Founded: 1998
- Headquarters: Oslo, Norway
- Area served: Europe
- Products: EQ Pure Arctic Oil, EQ Omega-3 Test Kit, EQ Vitamin K2 Test Kit, EQ Vitamin K2 + D3, EQ Essential, EQ Shacai, EQ Collagen Booster Serum, EQ Anti Age Collagen Premium, EQ Shake
- Revenue: 1,240,000,000 Norwegian krone
- Number of employees: 42
- Subsidiaries: eShop Holding AS
- Website: eqology.com

Eqology is a Norway-based multi-level marketing company established in 1998 with operations in most of Europe. Eqology develops, produces and distributes nutrition and skin care products through independent distributors.

Eqology AS, had 42 employees and approximately 7,000 independent distributors serving 40,000 customers in Europe as of March 2019. Eqology's headquarters is located in Oslo, Norway.

Previously known as SHINE, the company changed its name to Eqology in April 2011 as part of a rebranding effort. Eqology became publicly listed in September 2010, but was delisted from Oslo Axess in December 2015.

In 2017, the company was present in Norway, Denmark, Sweden, Finland, Estonia, Latvia, Lithuania, Austria, The Netherlands, Germany, Switzerland and Belgium. Later on Poland, Hungary, Romania, Czech Republic and Slovakia were added to the area served.
