= Link Mobility Group =

Norwegian CPaaS company

LINK Mobility Group AS
- Company type: Aksjeselskap
- Traded as: OSE: LINK
- Industry: Telecommunication
- Founded: 19 December 2000
- Headquarters: Oslo, Norway
- Area served: Europe; North America; Asia; Oceania; South America; United States
- Key people: Thomas Berge; Benoît Bole; Riccardo Dragoni; Ina Rasmussen; Morten L. Edvardsen; Julien Mangas; Pål M. Brun; Arnhild Sivertsen
- Products: Voice; SMS; MMS; RCS
- Revenue: ▲NOK 3.539 billion
- Operating income: ▲NOK 391 million
- Number of employees: ▲700
- Subsidiaries: Altria; Message Broadcast; Netsize; Xenioo

LINK Mobility Group AS is a cloud communications platform as a service (CPaaS) company headquartered in Oslo, Norway. Link Mobility allows customers to send, and receive phone calls, SMS, MMS, RCS and eMails through their API. LINK is publicly listed on the Oslo Stock Exchange. In 2017, LINK Mobility had a total turnover of 1,294 million NOK, increasing to NOK 3,539 billion in 2020. With 28 offices across 18 countries including Norway, Sweden, Denmark, Finland, Estonia, Latvia, Bulgaria, Germany, Spain, Poland, France, Switzerland, Austria, Italy and the United States. LINK is the largest CPaaS provider in Europe.

== History ==
LINK Mobility was founded in 2001 by Morten Kval with headquarters in Sandefjord, Norway. The company was originally called Zapdance, becoming LINK Mobility in 2007 after acquiring a Swedish CPaaS operator.

LINK's first major customer was Norwegian Air, where LINK provided SMS services such as boarding alerts and flight delay alerts.

=== Listings and delistings ===
LINK was first publicly listed on the Oslo Stock Exchange in the early 2010s, before being privatised by Abry Partners of Boston in mid 2018 for NOK 3.4 billion (USD 416 million). In December 2020, Abry chose to again list LINK on the OSE, with a list price of NOK 47 per share, rising 19% on its first trading day. After the listing, LINK had a market value of NOK 12.6 billion (USD 1.56 billion). LINK was named a Unicorn IPO by Bloomberg News and the 3rd largest European Technology IPO of 2020 by UK Tech News.

== Mergers and acquisitions ==
- 2017, Acquired Netmessage in France for EUR 9.9 million.
- 2018, Acquired HSL Mobile in The United Kingdom.
- 2018, Acquired Netsize in France, adding EUR 55.2 m/year of revenue.
- 2019, Acquired 5 Alterco subsidiaries for EUR 7.8 million.
- 2020, Acquired WebSMS and SimpleSMS in Austria.
- 2021, Acquired MarketingPlatform in Denmark.
- 2021, Acquired Amm in Italy for EUR 18.7 million.
- 2021, Acquired Tismi in The Netherlands for EUR 20 million.
- 2021, planned to acquire Soprano Design, based in Sydney, Australia for $600 million. However, Soprano exited negotiations over debt and share price concerns.
- 2021, Acquired Message Broadcast, based in Newport Beach, California, for $260 million.

== See also ==
- Unified communications
- GSMA
