= Avocet (disambiguation) =

Avocet is the common name of a genus of wading birds, Recurvirostra.

Avocet may also refer to:

- Avocet snipe eel, a fish
- Avro Avocet, a 1920s British naval fighter aircraft prototype
- Avocet (California), a California-based seller of outdoor sports equipment
- Avocet Mining, a West African company
- Avocet (album), by Bert Jansch
- USS Avocet (AVP-4), a 1918–1946 US Navy minesweeper
- USS Avocet (AMCU-16), a 1953–1960 US Navy minesweeper
- Avocet, a 1986 prototype locomotive of the British Rail Class 89
