= Zalaris =

Norwegian HR & payroll company

Zalaris ASA
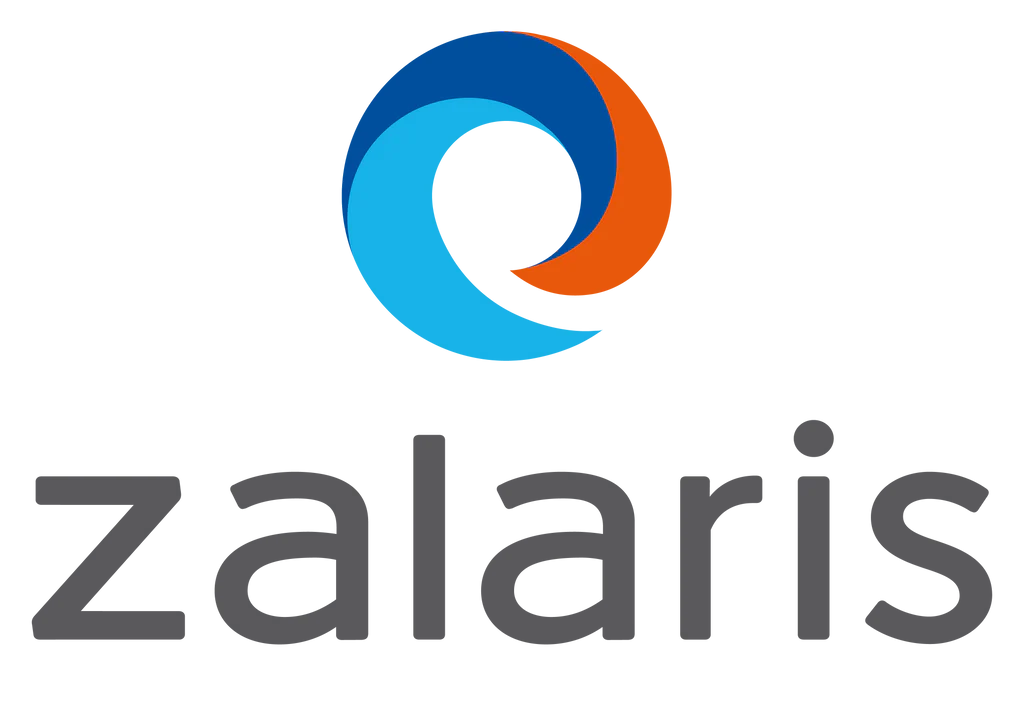
- Type: Allmennaksjeselskap
- Traded as: OSE: ZAL
- Industry: Outsourcing, HR
- Founded: 2000
- Headquarters: Oslo, Norway
- Revenue: ~NOK 1.3 bn (2024)
- Number of employees: 1100
- Website: www.zalaris.com

Zalaris ASA is a Norwegian company that delivers HR and payroll services to companies throughout Europe and the Asia Pacific. The company is headquartered in Oslo, Norway.

The company was founded in 2000 by Hans-Petter Mellerud. Zalaris was listed on the Oslo Stock Exchange in June 2014 with a market capitalization of 440 million NOK.
