= Birdstep Technology =

Norwegian information technology company

Birdstep Technology ASA
- Company type: Allmennaksjeselskap
- Traded as: OSE: BIRD
- Industry: Technology
- Founded: 1996; 30 years ago
- Headquarters: Oslo, Norway

Birdstep Technology is a public company, founded in 1996 and listed on the Oslo Stock Exchange since 2002 under the ticker BIRD. The company has 66 employees and is headquartered in Oslo, Norway, with competence centers in Sweden, Finland, UK and the United States. Birdstep Technology is a global provider of Smart Mobile Data and Secure Mobility for operators, enterprises and governmental organizations.

== History ==
Birdstep was founded in Oslo, Norway as a developer of embedded database systems. They expanded into Mobile IP and then into connection management. The company grew though acquisition and is now a combination of the original Birdstep Technology, Alice Systems, Aramova Inc. and SafeMove. In 2009, the company spun off the original database business and focused on connection management solutions. In 2015, the company completed the sale of the SafeMove Mobile VPN product line to Bittium Oy who continue to market the product as Bittium SafeMove. In 2016, Smith micro Software acquired Birdstep Technology AB, the software development and marketing arm of Birdstep Technology ASA (OSO: BIRD), for $2 million. The components of Birdstep's Smart Solution Suite were integrated into Smith Micro's NetWise platform, which provides solutions for connection management on wireless networks, Big Data analytics and credential provisioning and management.
