= Norwegian Property =

Norwegian real estate company

Norwegian Property ASA
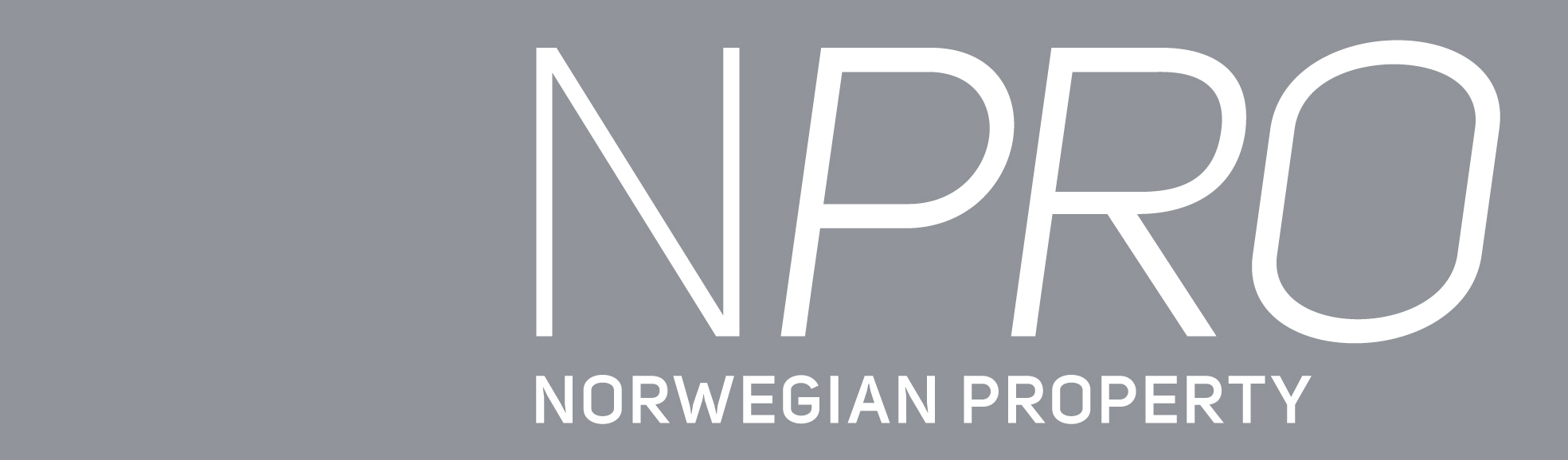
- Company type: Allmennaksjeselskap
- Traded as: OSE: NPRO
- Industry: Real estate
- Founded: 2006
- Headquarters: Oslo, Norway
- Area served: Norway
- Products: Commercial property investment
- Revenue: NOK 1.025 billion (2010)
- Net income: ▼ (NOK 459.6 million) (2010)
- Total assets: NOK 15.88 billion (end 2010)
- Total equity: NOK 4.989 billion (end 2010)
- Number of employees: 38 (end 2010)
- Website: www.norwegianproperty.no

Norwegian Property is a real estate company that has a portfolio in Oslo and Stavanger, Norway. Created in 2006 and listed on the Oslo Stock Exchange, it invests in major commercial real estate, offering its owners a publicly traded real estate portfolio, consisting of 762,000 square meters bought for NOK 19 billion.

The corporation was created in 2006 by Anders Wilhelmsen Group and Fram Management and was listed on the Oslo Stock Exchange on November 15, 2006.
