= Echoworx =

Software company in Canada

- Company type: Private
- Industry: Computer software
- Founded: 2000
- Headquarters: Toronto, Ontario, Canada
- Area served: Global
- Services: Email Encryption
- Number of employees: 65
- Website: www.echoworx.com

Echoworx, an email encryption software company, is based in Toronto, Ontario, Canada, with offices in the US and UK. As a certificate authority, Echoworx is a member of both the Microsoft Root Certificate Program and Apple Root Certificate Program. Echoworx operates several data centers, including locations in the United States and Europe.

== History ==
Founded in 2000, Echoworx is headed by its CEO and president Michael Ginsberg, formerly the CEO of CertaPay, an email money transfer technology company.

In December 2005, AT&T was one of the first telecommunications companies in the United States to white-label and provide Echoworx encryption services to its subscribers.

British Telecom launched BT Secure Mail and Encrypted Message Exchange (BT EMX) based on public key infrastructure (PKI) in October 2007.

Apptix is an application service provider (ASP) technology company providing hosted business services (or software as a service) for small and medium-sized businesses. It provided Apptix Secure Mail powered by Echoworx as part of its Hosted Email Security Services portfolio. It launched the service in April 2010.

Hostway, an infrastructure-as-a-service provider, partnered with Echoworx to provide encryption services in 2011.

In January 2025, Echoworx announced a partnership with SwissSign to deliver an automated S/MIME-based email-security solution for organizations in the DACH region. The collaboration integrates SwissSign certificates into Echoworx's encryption platform, streamlining certificate management and supporting compliance with regional data-protection requirements.

The company's original priority was the small business market, but this has evolved to the enterprise and corporate market.

== See also ==
- Email encryption
- Public-key infrastructure
- Secure messaging
- End-to-end encryption
