= Axactor =

Debt collection company

Axactor ASA
- Company type: Aksjeselskap
- Traded as: OSE: ACR
- Industry: Financial services
- Founded: 2015
- Headquarters: Oslo, Norway
- Services: Debt purchase Debt collection
- Number of employees: 18 (2026)
- Website: www.axactor.com

Axactor ASA is a multinational debt buyer, headquartered in Oslo. The company is listed on the Oslo Stock Exchange. The company was started in 2015 when Nickel Mountain Group acquired ALD Abogados in Spain. Axactor purchased its first NPL portfolio, through its Spanish subsidiary, in February 2016 worth approximately €500 million. In March 2016, IKAS Norge was acquired by Axactor, followed by similar acquisitions in Sweden, Germany, Italy and Finland.
