= Protector Forsikring =

Norwegian insurance company

Protector Forsikring ASA
- Type: Allmennaksjeselskap
- Traded as: OSE: PROTCT
- Industry: Financial services
- Founded: 2004
- Headquarters: Oslo, Norway
- Area served: Norway; Denmark; Sweden
- Products: Property insurance Casualty insurance
- Number of employees: 202 (2026)
- Website: www.protectorforsikring.no

Protector Forsikring ASA is a Norwegian multinational insurance company, headquartered in Oslo, Norway. The company offers property and casualty insurance.

Protector Forsikring was founded by Jostein Sørvoll.

In 2013, the insurance company had over 50 percent of the market share for ownership insurance in Norway.
