= Osea =

Osea or OSEA may refer to:

== Places ==
- Osea Island, an inhabited island in the estuary of the River Blackwater, Essex, East England

== Organizations or other items with the name or acronym ==
- Oregon Safe Employment Act (OSEA), the legislative act which gives the US State of Oregon the authority to administer OSHA regulations (see Oregon Occupational Safety and Health Division)
- Cyclone Osea, the second of seven cyclones to affect French Polynesia during the 1997-98 South Pacific cyclone season
- Ontario Sustainable Energy Association (OSEA), a non-profit organization supporting the growth of renewable energy projects in Ontario, Canada
- Osea, the third album (released in 2013) of Irish musical duo "Hudson Taylor" (see Hudson Taylor (musician))
- Osea, a fictional country in Ace Combat 5: The Unsung War, Zero: The Belkan War, and 7: Skies Unknown, also called the Osean Federation

== People with the given name ==
- Osea Kolinisau (born 1985), Fijian rugby player
- Osea Sadrau (born 1986), Fijian rugby league player for AS Carcassonne in the Elite One Championship;
- Osea Vakatalesau (born 1986), Fijian football striker playing for the Fiji national football team; or the

== Similar ==
- Oséas (born 1971), fully Oséas Reis dos Santos, a retired Brazilian football player;
- Oseas Guiñazú, fully Oseas Guiñazú Estrella, an Argentine politician of the late 19th century;
- OSEAX, the Oslo Børs All Share Index, a financial index operated by the Oslo Stock Exchange
