= Faktor =

Faktor may refer to:

== Surname ==
- Emil Faktor (1876–1942), Czechoslovak German-language theater critic, editor, and writer
- Ľubomír Faktor (born 1967), Slovak football midfielder

== Other uses ==
- Faktor Eiendom, a Norwegian construction company
- Faktor (newspaper), in Bosnia and Herzegovina; see Media in Sarajevo § Print
