= Norway Royal Salmon =

Norwegian fish farming company

Norway Royal Salmon ASA
- Type: Allmennaksjeselskap
- Traded as: OSE: NRS
- Industry: Fish farming
- Founded: 1992
- Headquarters: Trondheim, Norway,
- Products: Atlantic Salmon; Brown trout
- Website: www.norwayroyalsalmon.com

Norway Royal Salmon ASA was a Norwegian fish farm company, headquartered in Trondheim, Norway with a sales office in Kristiansand. After nearly 30 years of operation, the company merged with SalMar in 2022, with SalMar acquiring all of NRS's assets and operations. While the aquaculture activities were incorporated into SalMar, the trading activities became part of Visscher Seafood Group.

Norway Royal Salmon was established by 34 Norwegian salmon farmers in 1992. The philosophy behind Norway Royal Salmon was to build a totally integrated fish farming chain in order to take full control over quality in all parts of the business. In the years that have passed since the start, the company has stuck to its business plan and has grown by acquiring and taking over various aquaculture companies. Today Norway Royal Salmon is a fully integrated salmon farming company with full control of the process from smolt to the market place. The company is a leading producer of sustainable salmon and is listed on the Oslo Stock Exchange. It sells about 70,000 tons of salmon every year. This equates to almost 1 million salmon meals per day, all year round.

Norway Royal Salmon has always focused on extensive research, development, cooperation and innovation. They continually aim to improve their production and they work hard to ensure that they are at the front edge of development. It was no coincidence that they were awarded most licenses – 9 – when the Norwegian Government awarded new green licenses in 2014. Furthermore, in 2015 they had their first production sites ASC certified and by 2020 all their production sites will be ASC certified

The company became publicly listed on the Oslo Stock Exchange in March 2011. The IPO valued the company at 832 million NOK. Norway Royal Salmon is a member of the Global Salmon Initiative.

The company was criticized in 2011 by the Royal House of Norway for using the word "Royal" in a company name. CEO of Norway Royal Salmon said that when the company was founded in 1992, he got verbal permission to use "Royal" in the company name, as long as "Royal" wasn't the first part of the name. Communications manager Marianne Hagen at the Royal House could not find anything in the archives to support this claim.

Green Warriors of Norway reported subsidiary NRS Finnmark to the police after the escape of 3,570 farmed salmon from a facility in the Kufjorden (a small fjord on the island of Seiland in Alta Municipality. Farmed salmon is a direct threat to the wild salmon in the Alta river system.

== Accidents ==
- On 3 July 2012, a fishing vessel owned by Norway Royal Salmon sank outside of Store Kufjorden in Finnmark. A mother and daughter were killed. The company was criticized by Accident Investigation Board Norway.
