= XXL Sport & Villmark =

Norwegian listed sports equipment chain

XXL AS
- Type: Aksjeselskap
- Industry: Retail
- Founded: 2001
- Founder: Øivind Tidemandsen
- Headquarters: Oslo, Norway
- Area served: Norway; Sweden; Finland
- Products: Sportswear; Sporting goods Sports apparel Outdoor apparel Running shoes Bicycles; Cycling equipment Football; Ice hockey Skating; Golf; Disc golf Floorball; Tennis; Badminton; Handball; Horse riding Skateboarding; Cross-Country skiing Alpine skiing Snowboarding; Hiking; Climbing; Fishing; Hunting; Fitness; Protein nutrition Heartrate monitors Optics; Sport tech
- Website: https://www.xxl.no/

XXL AS is a Norwegian sporting goods retailer with brick and mortar stores and online stores in the Nordics. XXL is the largest and fastest growing sports retailer by revenue in the Nordic region. XXL's headquarter is located in Oslo, Norway. XXL opened its first store in central Oslo in 2001 and online store in 2002.

The company was listed on the Oslo Stock Exchange (OSE: XXL). It was delisted on 22 July 2025.

The company is since 2025 owned by Frasers Group.
