= Intex Resources =

Mining company

Intex Resources ASA
- Company type: Allmennaksjeselskap
- Traded as: OSE: ITX
- Industry: Mining
- Founded: 1996
- Headquarters: Oslo, Norway
- Area served: Global
- Key people: Hans Christian Qvist (CEO); Jan A. Vestrum (Chairman)
- Products: Nickel
- Website: www.intexresources.com

Intex Resources (OSE: ITX) is an international mining company based in Norway. Its portfolio consists of non-precious minerals and the main project is a nickel project in Mindoro in the Philippines. Other projects include Hurdal and Ramnes, both molybdenum north of Oslo in Norway, Seqi Olivine in Sweden and Maniitsoq diamond project north of Nuuk in Greenland.

The longtime Chairman of Intex Resources stepped down Sep 19, 2013.

The company was created as a demerger from Crew Gold and the largest owner is the Canadian Crew Development Corp. (28%). The main office is located in Oslo.
