= Øyno =

Øyno is a surname. Notable people with the surname include:

- Erik Bødtker Øyno (born 1965), Norwegian businessman
- Lars Øyno (born 1955), Norwegian actor, director and playwright
