= Data Respons =

Data Respons ASA
- Company type: Allmennaksjeselskap
- Traded as: OSE: DAT
- Industry: Information technology
- Founded: 1986
- Headquarters: Oslo, Norway
- Area served: Norway
- Key people: Kenneth Ragnvaldsen (CEO); Erik Langaker (Chairman)
- Products: Embedded systems
- Number of employees: 6 (2026)
- Website: www.datarespons.com

Data Respons ASA is a company that develops embedded systems within the areas of Transport & Automotive, Telecom & Media, Industry Automation, Energy & Maritime, Medtech, Space, Defense & Security, and Finance & Public. The company was acquired by French Akka Technologies in 2020.

The company has offices in Norway, Sweden, Denmark, Germany and Taiwan.
