= Bionor Pharma =

Norwegian biotechnology company (1993-2017)

Bionor Holding AS
- Type: Aksjeselskap
- Industry: Biotechnology
- Founded: 2 January 1993
- Defunct: 2017
- Headquarters: Oslo, Norway
- Key people: Birger Sørensen (CEO), Dag Arne Wivelstad, Aslak Aslaksen, Per Bengtsson
- Products: Vaccine; Soy protein Health care Natural Health Products
- Revenue: NOK 109.499 million (2011)
- Operating income: NOK 46 057 million (2011)
- Net income: NOK 49 020 million (2011)
- Total assets: NOK 253 395 million (2011)
- Total equity: NOK 203 320 million (2011)
- Number of employees: 18 (2011)
- Website: www.bionorholding.com

Bionor Holding AS is a Norwegian biotechnology company, developing vaccines targeted at rapidly mutating virus infections such as HIV, Hepatitis C and Influenza. The company is also a leader in soy technology and has developed patented products for improved health and prevention of lifestyle-related diseases. It was founded by Cand.med. and Dr.philos. in protein and lipid research, Lars Høie.

== Brands ==
The company was, under their name Nutri Pharma, formerly known for their soy-based product series within weight management (Nutrilett®, Scan Diet® and NutriPro®), cholesterol reduction (Abacor® and Abalon®) and menopausal and pre-menstrual symptoms (Nutri5®). The marketing and distribution rights for Nutri5 and NutriPro was in 2008 licensed to Nikken Europe for sale in 19 European countries, and in 2009 for Russia and CIS countries. The brand Nutrilett was in 2010 sold to the Orkla-owned health-supplements firm Axellus.

After the sale of their main brands, the company have moved focus to the vaccine business after the acquisition of biotechnology company Bionor Immuno in 2010.

In 2016, the company was taken over by new investors who pivoted its business from biotech to property management, under the new name Solon.

Since January 2018, the shareholders unanimously adopted to change the name of the company from Bionor Pharma AS to Bionor Holding AS.

== Products in development ==
Per May, Bionor Pharma has four different vaccine candidates in their product pipeline, from preclinical phase to phase II, leading to phase III which is the last phase before regulatory approval and potential market entry.

=== Vacc-4x ===
Vacc-4x aims to generate immune responses to conserved domains, regions of the virus common to all strains of HIV, even if the virus mutates. Persistent immune responses against this part of the virus (the HIV p24 protein) has been shown to delay HIV disease progression. Vacc-4x is made of modified synthetic peptides targeting these conserved regions of the HIV p24. Upon immunization with Vacc-4x, potentially followed by reboosting vaccinations, Bionor's researchers are seeking to control virus infection for a longer period of time by exercising the patient's own immune system to seek out and kill virus-producing cells.

In phase II, 134 HIV-infected people from Europe and the US participated in a randomized, placebo-controlled study, where 93 randomly selected people where to receive Vacc-4x and 43 randomly selected people received a placebo injection. The patients were injected with either placebo or Vacc-4x in 28 weeks, followed up by 24 weeks without any injection.

77 people successfully completed the study (week 52); 25 from the placebo group and 56 from the Vacc-4x group. The placebo group (n=25) had a viral load set point (average of the last two viral load measurements before the end of the study) of 61,900 HIV-RNA/copies/ml (median), compared to the Vacc-4x group (n=56) that had a viral load set point of 22,300 HIV-RNA/copies/ml (median). This difference represents a reduction of 64% and is statistically significant (p=0.04).

Bionor Pharma is in the process of conducting two further clinical studies with the Vacc-4x, which can lead towards phase III, which include 1. Vacc-4x in combination with Celgene`s immune modulator Revlimid and 2. reboosting patients from the phase II study to investigate whether this can result in a further reduction in viral load.

Thirty three patients from USA and four European countries from the last study with Vacc-4x are taking part at ten clinics. The study was approved in all participating countries in Q4 2012, with startup of patient screening soon after.

=== Others ===
Other vaccines include humoral, antibody-mediated peptide-based therapeutic HIV-1 vaccine Vacc-C5, that aims to guide the immune system to seek out and kill HIV-infected cells, Vacc-HCV, aiming to treat chronic HCV infection that affects the liver and Vacc-Flu, which is in the preclinical phase of development.
