= Melhus Sparebank =

Norwegian savings bank

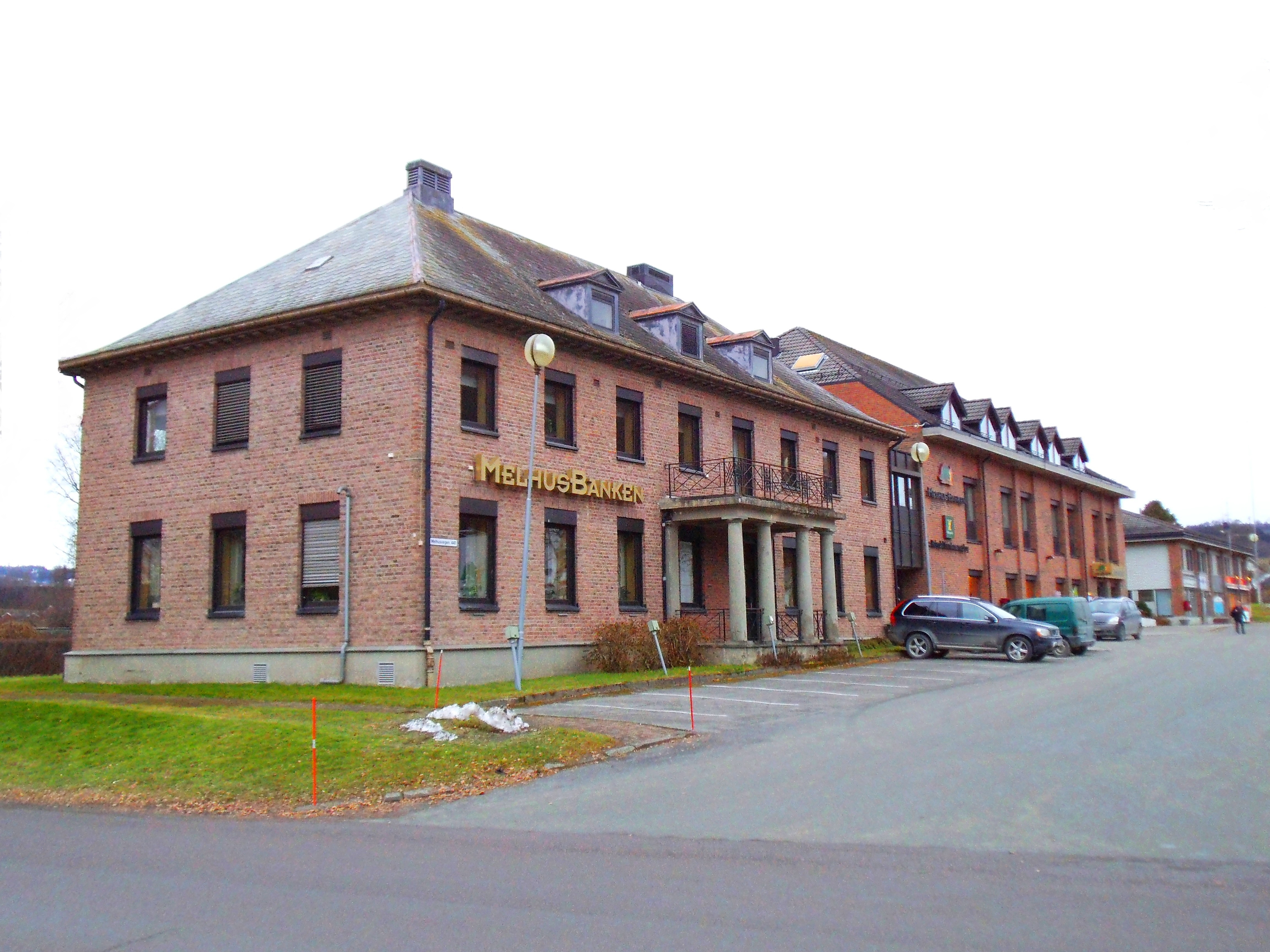
- Type: Savings bank
- Traded as: OSE: MELG
- Industry: Financial services
- Founded: 1840
- Headquarters: Melhus Municipality, Norway,
- Area served: Sør-Trøndelag
- Number of employees: 79 (2026)
- Website: www.melhusbanken.no

Melhus Sparebank is a Norwegian savings bank, headquartered in Melhus Municipality, Norway. The bank’s main market is the southern part of Trøndelag county. The bank was established in 1840 and is one of Norway’s oldest savings banks.
