= Jinhui Shipping and Transport =

Jinhui Shipping and Transport Limited
- Native name: 金輝集團有限公司
- Company type: Public
- Traded as: OSE: JIN
- Industry: Shipping
- Headquarters: Hong Kong
- Area served: Global
- Key people: Ng Siu Fai (Chairman)
- Parent: Jinhui Holdings
- Website: www.jinhuiship.com

Jinhui Shipping and Transport (OSE: JIN) is a Hong Kong–based Bermuda-registered shipping company that owns 24 vessels. The company is owned for 54.77% by Jinhui Holdings and has been listed on the Oslo Stock Exchange since 1994.
