= Napatech =

Technology company based in Denmark

Napatech A/S
- Type: Aktieselskab
- Traded as: OSE: NAPA
- Founded: 2003; 23 years ago
- Headquarters: Søborg, Denmark
- Area served: Worldwide
- Key people: Lars Boilesen (Chair); Kartik Srinivasan (CEO); Henrik Brill Jensen (COO)
- Products: SmartNICs
- Website: www.napatech.com

Napatech is a public company based in Denmark that develops and manufactures high speed network accelerators (SmartNICs) specifically designed for real-time network monitoring and analysis applications. The accelerators can be used in standard servers, allowing OEM vendors to build products using commercial off-the-shelf hardware. Examples of typical applications are network performance monitoring, test and measurement, security and optimization. Napatech's products are used in a variety of industries such as financial services, telecom, cloud and data center services, e-commerce and media, infrastructure and defense, as well as enterprise management and security.

The company, which is an OEM supplier with a base of over 140,000 ports deployed, enables network equipment manufacturers to provide visibility into the performance and operation of their customers' networks, applications and data services.

Napatech entered the Oslo Stock Exchange in December 2013.

== History ==
=== Early days ===
Napatech was founded in January 2003 as a privately owned company by Jens Christophersen and Thomas Jørgensen, two Danish IT entrepreneurs who initially worked from an office at the Technical University of Denmark. They raised US$320,000 for prototype development of their first, programmable 10GbE accelerator. Christophersen and Jørgensen had identified a problem with the unprecedented growth of data, and their idea was that since Internet traffic roughly doubles every year, the hardware itself could not keep up with the rate of data growth. They also saw and understood the need for monitoring the performance of a network in order to enable the optimization of it and its applications.

Napatech, which is itself a combination of the words 'Napa Valley' and 'Technology', was growing rapidly in 2003, and by August the company had five employees. By the end of 2003, the company announced the industry's first 10G programmable Ethernet accelerator based on the Virtex-II Pro FPGA. Soon after, the company set out to conquer Silicon Valley and established their first office in Mountain View, California.

=== Acquisitions ===
In February 2006, the company agreed to buy the IP and business assets from Xyratex, a move which helped raise the profile of Napatech vis-à-vis programmable network accelerators. Napatech successfully integrated the Ethernet adapter business from Xyratex, subsequently generating US$4 million in revenue, while an additional US$5 million in new capital was raised from Northzone and Ferd Venture.

== Products ==
Napatech's product portfolio of network accelerators span speeds ranging from 1 Gbit/s up to 100 Gbit/s of speed with 1, 2 or 4-port variants. Its first product was an accelerator launched in December 2003 which supported 10 Gbit/s network speeds. Up until the first quarter of 2014, the company has produced approximately 40+ different models of accelerators. Some of the most important features being the capture of all network data at full line rate, and guaranteed delivery of data with zero packet loss.

Napatech's accelerators allow for off-loading of I/O as well as CPU-intensive functions of network tasks, in a similar way that PC video cards or graphics accelerators do with graphics calculations.

Napatech's lineup of accelerators include:

- NT200A02 (2 port, 100G)
- NT100E3-1-PTP (1 port, 100G)
- NT40E3-4-PTP (4 port, 10G)
- NT40E2-1 (1 port, 40G)
- NT20E2-PTP (2 port, 10G)
- NT4E2-4-PTP (4 port, 1G)
- NT4E2-4T-BP (4 port, 1G)
- NT4E-NEBS (4 port, 1G)
- NT20E-NEBS (2 port, 10G)
- NT4E-STD (4 port, 1G)

== Locations ==
Napatech is headquartered in the suburb of Søborg, located in the north of Copenhagen, Denmark, with sales offices in the United States; São Paulo, Brazil; Tokyo, Japan; and Seoul, South Korea. The American subsidiary has offices located in Andover, Massachusetts; Mountain View, California; and Columbia, Maryland.
