= Odfjell =

Norwegian shipping company

Odfjell SE
- Type: Societas Europaea
- Traded as: OSE: ODF
- Industry: Shipping
- Founded: 17 November 1914
- Headquarters: Bergen, Norway
- Key people: Harald Fotland (Chief Executive Officer); Terje Iversen (Chief Financial Officer); Øistein Jensen (Chief Sustainability Officer); Bjørn Hammer (Chief Commercial Officer); Torger Trige (Chief Technical Officer); Adrian Lenning (Managing Director, Terminals)
- Number of employees: 2,300 (2022)
- Website: odfjell.com

Odfjell SE is a company specialising in worldwide seaborne transportation and storage of chemicals and other speciality bulk liquids. The Odfjell fleet comprises more than 80 ships in total. The ships transport around 600 different kinds of liquids, including organic and inorganic bulk liquid chemicals, acids, animal fats, edible oils, portable alcohols and clean petroleum products. Odfjell’s ships are mainly registered in Norway (NIS) and Singapore, and are primarily crewed by Norwegian and Filipino mariners.

The tank terminal division consists of four tank terminals, located in Belgium, USA and South Korea. Odfjell Terminals is also part of a network in South America, consisting of another 10 tank terminals partly owned by related parties.

Odfjell has offices in 12 locations around the world, and is headquartered in Bergen, Norway. The company employs around 2,300 people and posted annual gross revenue of USD 1083 million in 2021.

Odfjell has a wide range of customers, from the oil majors and largest chemical manufacturers to smaller logistical companies and traders.

== History ==
Odfjell is among the oldest existing shipping companies in Bergen, Norway. In 1890, Captain Berent Daniel Olsen moved to Bergen to work in the shipping industry. The first joint ship owning company was registered in 1914 by Olsen’s sons, Fredrik, Abraham and Andreas Odfjell. As their logo, the Odfjell brothers adopted three interlocked rings in red, blue and yellow, representing each of the three. Fredrik and Abraham incorporated the joint ship management company AS Rederiet Odfjell in April 1915, and in 1917 the brothers took over the shipping company AS DS Storli.

=== World War II ===
At the outbreak of World War II, Odfjell managed a fleet of seven ships. The German occupation of Norway split the Odfjell fleet in two. The three ships in home waters were ordered to serve German occupants, whilst the four ships on the high seas were controlled by Nortraship, the Norwegian Shipping and Trade Mission, who was established in 1940 to administer the Norwegian merchant fleet outside of German-controlled areas. The home fleet suffered terrible losses. Two of the three ships were lost and 41 people perished. Three of the four ships in the Nortraship fleet came through the war unscathed. The only ship lost had been requisitioned by France and was sailing under French name and flag with a French crew.

=== 1945-1969 ===
Fredrik and Abraham Odfjell died in 1950 and 1960 respectively. Their sons, Bernt Daniel Odfjell and Johan Odvar Odfjell took over the company. During the 1950s, Odfjell pursued two paths: the general cargo liner trade and operation of small tankers. The latter ships gradually became more sophisticated and specialised, capable of carrying sulphuric acid.

During the 1960s, the company made a strategic repositioning by expanding the chemical tanker business. MT Lind was Odfjell’s most significant ship in this period. The vessel was built for Odfjell by the Norwegian Stord Verft and was the world’s first purpose-built stainless steel tanker. During this period, the shift in focus from general cargo vessels to purpose-built smaller chemical tankers was completed.

Odfjell also entered new markets: Tank terminals and offshore drilling rigs. In 1963, Odfjell started its own chartering department, Minde Chartering, which was an important step towards making Odfjell a fully integrated shipping company. In 1969, Odfjell opened their first tank terminal, the TAGSA terminal in Buenos Aires, Argentina.

=== 1970-1989 ===
Following the 1973 OPEC oil embargo, the economic situation in the shipping industry worsened dramatically. Old, well-established shipping companies went under, and laid-up crude oil tankers became a familiar sight in many Norwegian fjords. The situation was turbulent for Odfjell as well, however, after having carved out a profitable niche in the chemicals trade market, the Company was not as hard hit as shipping companies in other trades. As it was almost impossible to convert other types of ships into chemical tankers due to new strict regulatory regimes, the chemical tanker market was largely spared of surplus tonnage.

In 1979, the Odfjell family decided to split the Company in two, based on differences in outlook on future activities. The split was effective from 1 March 1980. Bernt Daniel Odfjell and his son Dan Odfjell took over the deep-sea chemical tanker fleet, with Skibsaksjeselskapet Storli as their main corporate entity, and including the terminal business. Johan Odvar Odfjell and his son Abraham Odfjell took over the small tankers, later developed into Jo Tankers, and the offshore rig business through Odfjell Drilling and Consulting Company (ODCC).

The family split and the challenging market condition during the 1970s and early 1980s left the Company considerably smaller and financially rather strained. To regain the leading position in the chemical tankers segment, the strategic focus was set on consolidation and growth. The Company partnered with Westfal-Larsen, a new tank terminal in Houston, Texas was established, and the Company invested in new orders and acquisitions of second-hand tonnage, to fund these investments, Skibsaksjeselskapet Storli went public, and in 1986 the Storli share was listed on the Oslo Stock Exchange.

=== 1990-2018 ===
During the 1990s, the Company continued to expand. National Chemical Carriers (NCC) of Saudi Arabia replaced Westfal-Larsen as chemical tanker partner. The Company entered the Asian tanker market and became a player in the regional short-sea markets in Asia and the Americas. In February 1998, the Company changed name from S/A Storli to Odfjell ASA, with the implementation of the current company logo. The three interlinked rings are retained as the ships’ bow mark, signifying the original three Odfjell brothers.

The expansion continued into the new millennium, both in the deep-sea and short-sea segments, as well as tank terminals. In year 2000, Odfjell announced the merger between Odfjell Tankers and Seachem, and added 20 new ships to the fleet. At the time of the merger, Odfjell was the world’s second largest operator of chemical tankers, Seachem the fourth. Later the same year, Odfjell acquired the Botlek Tank Terminal in Rotterdam, Netherlands, and renamed it to Odfjell Terminals (Rotterdam). Thereafter, the involvement in tank terminals increased rapidly. In 2012, Odfjell re-entered the gas carrier business through an acquisition of two second-hand 9,000 cbm LPG/Ethylene carriers.

In 2015-16, Odfjell went through a two-year transition phase, focusing on building strength and preparing the Company for growth. The Board of Odfjell SE launched a cost cutting programme in January 2015 to significantly improve the financial performance of Odfjell’s Chemical Tanker business. For the annual report presentation in 2017, the Company showed positive results and a significant improvement in the financial performance and competitiveness, despite a challenging global market situation.

== 2019–2024 ==
In 2019, Odfjell SE underwent a significant fleet renewal, expanded its market presence, and strengthened its financial position. The company took delivery of the world’s four largest stainless steel chemical tankers in the Hudong class and sold its stake in the terminal in Jiangyin, China. Recognizing its environmental impact, Odfjell signed the UNGC Sustainable Ocean Principles and became a member of the Getting to Zero Coalition.

In 2020, building on the positive financial performance of 2019, Odfjell benefited from a renewed and more efficient chemical tanker fleet, continued improvement in Odfjell Terminals, and another year of favorable chemical tanker markets. The company set targets related to climate action and diversity, appointed its first Chief Sustainability Officer, and linked sustainability goals to financial instruments. Odfjell reduced its carbon intensity and continued efforts toward decarbonization. Despite the COVID-19 pandemic, the company delivered improved financial results and maintained strong performance on key operational and safety metrics.

In 2021, the pandemic continued to impact operations, causing significant supply chain disruptions that negatively affected chemical exports from the United States. As a result, the U.S. chemical tanker market experienced a downturn. However, reduced U.S. output led to increased demand for chemical exports from Asia, contributing to a surge in trade volumes and freight rates. That year, Odfjell exited the gas carrier segment and withdrew from short-sea trade in Asia, refocusing on deep-sea shipping. It also became the first company in the shipping industry to issue a sustainability-linked bond.

Although global uncertainty continued in 2022, Odfjell experienced encouraging market developments. The initial optimism of a post-pandemic recovery was disrupted in February by the Russian invasion of Ukraine. Despite volatile geopolitical conditions, the chemical tanker segment remained resilient. Odfjell continued investing in digital solutions and sustainability initiatives while expanding terminal operations in Houston and Antwerp.

In 2023, Odfjell reported a 50% reduction in the carbon intensity of its fleet compared to the IMO's 2008 baseline. Later in the year, the company rerouted ships due to Houthi attacks in the Red Sea to ensure crew and vessel safety.

In 2024, Odfjell celebrated its 110th anniversary with a record-breaking financial year and key milestones. The company continued to modernize its chemical tanker fleet, adding four newbuild vessels on long-term charter and acquiring one supersegregator previously under operational lease. By the end of the year, Odfjell had 18 chemical tankers on order—approximately 16% of the global orderbook in its segment—of which two will be owned by Odfjell and the remainder secured via long-term time charters. Four vessels were scheduled for delivery in 2025.

Odfjell reported a 52.7% improvement in its average Annual Efficiency Ratio (AER) compared to the 2008 baseline, reflecting investments in vessel maintenance, upgrades, and technology aimed at reducing carbon intensity. In response to global risks—including cybersecurity threats, hybrid warfare, the rise of a shadow fleet, and climate change—the company reaffirmed its focus on safety, operational excellence, and energy efficiency.

== 2025 and beyond ==
In early 2025, the chemical tanker Bow Olympus became the first in the Odfjell fleet to cross the Atlantic using wind-assisted propulsion Suction Sails (eSails from Bound4Blue). On its return voyage, the vessel was bunkered with certified 100% sustainable biofuel. This combination of technologies marked a milestone in Odfjell’s decarbonization efforts.

CEO Harald Fotland emphasized that while global challenges persist, they also present opportunities. For example, drought conditions in the Panama Canal tightened an already marginal chemical shipping market, resulting in higher spot market rates. He also highlighted that climate risk is a catalyst for innovation. The company is preparing to launch its first vessel equipped with suction sails and is exploring alternative fuels and new technologies. Odfjell also plans to expand its digitalization strategy and explore the use of artificial intelligence, while enhancing cybersecurity measures.

Geopolitical developments are expected to influence markets in 2025, particularly the outcome of the U.S. presidential election. A second Trump administration could bring heightened protectionism, new trade barriers—particularly targeting China—and continued sanctions on Iran. China's economic trajectory, amid demographic stagnation, is another key factor for global trade. Reduced U.S. chemical exports to China could be offset by longer-haul shipments to alternative markets, mirroring patterns observed after sanctions on Russia redirected trade flows across regions.

== Organisation ==
=== Odfjell SE ===
Odfjell SE is the ultimate parent company of the Odfjell Group, and is a public limited company traded on the Oslo Stock Exchange. The Odfjell Group includes Odfjell SE, subsidiaries incorporated in several countries and the share of investments in joint ventures. Odfjell SE provides an in-house management, Odfjell Ship Management (SM).

Odfjell SM offers a fully integrated service, with fleet management, crewing, procurement- and logistics, technology support, newbuilding and QHSSE (Quality, Health, Safety, Security and Environment). SM provides direct support to ships operating in regional trades, and ships in the deep-sea fleet, as well as professional crew management.

=== Odfjell Tankers AS ===
Odfjell Tankers AS, a subsidiary of Odfjell SE, controls and operates a fleet of around 80 ships, including owned, time- and bareboat chartered vessels, and newbuildings on order. With offices at strategic locations around the world, Odfjell Tankers operates globally and regionally with tonnage ranging from 5,000 DWT to 75,000 DWT. The majority of the tonnage is owned and managed by Odfjell SE.

=== Odfjell Terminals ===
Odfjell operates three tank terminals at strategic locations in Korea (Ulsan) and USA (Charleston and Houston), and is in addition non-operating partner in the Noord Natie Odfjell Antwerp Terminal in Belgium. These four terminals offer a total 1.2 million cubic meters of storage space. Odfjell Terminals has a cooperation agreement with another 10 terminals in South America, including Peru, Brazil, Argentina and Chile. These terminals are partly owned by related parties.
