= YA Bank =

yA – part of Resurs Bank
- Company type: Aksjeselskap
- Traded as: YAHO.OTC (indirectly)
- Industry: Banking, financial services
- Founded: 2006
- Defunct: 3 December 2018
- Headquarters: Oslo, Norway
- Net income: 76.57 mln NOK (2014)
- Total assets: 3.17 bln NOK(2014)
- Total equity: 361.67 mln NOK (2014)
- Owner: Resurs Bank
- Website: www.ya.no

yA is a brand name of the Resurs Bank, which offers consumer loans, deposits, credit cards and other loans to the retail market in Norway.

== Information ==
Established in 2006 and with headquarters in Oslo, Norway, yA Bank has over 100,000 customers.

yA Bank, a limited company (aksjeselskap or AS), is owned by yA Holding, a public limited company (allmennaksjeselskap or ASA), where shareholders include Norwegian and foreign institutional investors, funds, and banks. Kistefos AS is the largest shareholder. yA Holding is traded over the counter on the NOTC A-list of The Norwegian Securities Dealers Association.

yA Bank is a member of the Norwegian Banks' Guarantee Fund.

In 2015, consumer finance bank Resurs Bank AB agreed to acquire shares in yA Bank in a transaction valued at NOK 1.58 billion. On November 30, 2018, yA Bank merged with Resurs Bank.

== Website ==
- yA.no
