= Borgestad (company) =

Norwegian shipping, industry and real estate company

Borgestad ASA
- Company type: Allmennaksjeselskap
- Traded as: OSE: BOR
- Industry: Shipping; Manufacturing; Real estate
- Founded: 1 July 1904
- Headquarters: Skien, Norway
- Area served: Global
- Website: www.borgestad.no

Borgestad ASA (OSE: BOR) is a Norwegian shipping, industry and real estate company. The corporation has two primary divisions: Borgestad Properties and Borgestad Industries.

Borgestad Properties operates 11 open hatch bulk carriers and one Floating Production Storage and Offloading vessel. It also owns a shopping centre in Bytom, Poland and a housing complex at Borgestadholmen in Skien. Borgestad Industries develops and produces refractory and fire-resistant products.

The company dates back to 1 July 1904, when Aktieselskapet Borgestad was founded by Prime Minister Gunnar Knudsen when he merged his shipping companies and listed on the Oslo Stock Exchange ten years later.
