= ABG Sundal Collier =

Nordic investment bank

ABG Sundal Collier Holding ASA
- Company type: Allmennaksjeselskap
- Traded as: OSE: ABG
- Industry: Financial services
- Founded: 2001 as ABG Sundal Collier 1997 as ABG Securities 1984 as Sundal Collier
- Founders: Klas Andersson, Anders Bråtenius, Michael Grundberg, Dagfinn Sundal and Jan Collier
- Headquarters: Oslo, Norway
- Area served: Global
- Revenue: 1 704 323 000 NOK (2022)
- Net income: 282 000 000 NOK (2022)
- Number of employees: 331 (2022)
- Website: www.abgsc.com

ABG Sundal Collier Holding ASA is a Nordic investment bank offering investment banking, stock broking and corporate advisory services to institutional investors and high net-worth individuals (HNWI). Its shares are publicly quoted and listed on the Oslo Stock Exchange. ABGSC provides distribution of Nordic securities to local and international investors. Founded in 1984, the company is headquartered in Oslo, Norway. The group currently has approximately 250 partners and employees working from offices in Oslo, Stockholm, Copenhagen, London, New York City and Frankfurt.

Andrew Stuttaford was President of the company in the United States from 2002 to 2020.

In December 2025, it was announced ABGSC would acquire the independent Danish M&A and strategic financial advisory firm, FIH Partners for an upfront payment of Dkr50 million (US$7.8 million) in cash and shares, with potential additional payments of up to Dkr150 million (US$23.3 million) over four years. The deal, subject to regulatory approval, is expected to close in early 2026, after which FIH Partners will be merged with ABG Sundal Collier's Danish operations under the ABGSC brand.
