= Itera ASA =

Internet consultancy

- Traded as: OSE: ITE
- Industry: Consulting
- Founded: 1995
- Headquarters: Oslo, Norway
- Key people: Arne Mjøs(CEO)
- Revenue: NOK 633 million (2021)
- Operating income: ▲NOK 0 million (2021)
- Number of employees: 680 (Headquarter)
- Website: www.itera.no

Itera ASA is a Scandinavian group of consultancy companies providing Internet-based services. The company's headquarters is located in Oslo, Norway and its CEO is Arne Mjøs.

Itera Consulting is a subsidiary of Itera ASA and is based in Norway, Sweden, Denmark, Ukraine and Slovakia.

Itera has more than 500 employees working in offices in Norway, Sweden, Denmark, Ukraine and Slovakia.

== History ==
=== The beginning ===
Itera was founded in 1995 in Norway as Objectware. In 1999, Itera itself was founded and started functioning on the Norwegian market. Later that year, it was included to the list of Oslo Stock Exchange. In 2000, Itera merged with Objectware.

=== Itera Consulting ===
In 2000, Itera Consulting was established. In 2000, Itera entered Sweden by acquisition of the business intelligence company IT Partner and entered Denmark with the acquisition of the web company 3Enigheten.

In 2008, Itera Consulting entered Ukraine, an important location for Central and Eastern European outsourcing. Itera Consulting is represented in Ukraine by a nearshore development center. The first delivery office was started in the capital city of Kyiv. It was established by composing a management team with over 10-years experience from leading organizations within offshoring. The business of Itera Consulting Ukraine is headed by VP Global Sourcing Igor Mendzebrovski, formerly one of the founders of leading offshoring company in Eastern Europe. In the beginning of 2011 a second delivery office was started in Lviv, Ukraine.

In 2008, Objectware was renamed Itera Consulting.

== Itera Group companies ==
Itera ASA Group companies spheres of business: Communication, Consulting, Operations, Business Solutions. The group companies are linked by shared ownership, entrepreneurial philosophy and assets.

- Itera Consulting: Provides consulting, develops and manages IT services. Operates in Norway, Sweden, Denmark and Ukraine via project implementation at the customer's location, in company own premises, or via nearshoring development center in Ukraine.
- Itera Gazette: Itera Gazette is a communications agency. Company has customers in both the public and private spheres.
- Itera Networks: Delivers consulting services, on-demand infrastructure services and IT operations to organisations in Norway and Sweden.
- Compendia: Compendia develops and delivers web-based services and content and provides HR, management, HSE and quality assurance consulting. Compendia's services are customized for managers, employees and workers' representatives in companies, government bodies and workers’ organizations in Norway.
- Cicero Consulting: Offers consulting services within banking and finance in the Nordic region.
