= Grieg Seafood =

Norwegian seafood company

Grieg Seafood ASA
- Company type: Allmennaksjeselskap
- Traded as: OSE: GSF
- Industry: Seafood
- Founded: 1992
- Headquarters: Bergen, Norway
- Area served: Global
- Key people: Morten Vike (CEO); Ivar Kvangardsnes (Deputy CEO); Helge Nielsen (Chairman)
- Products: Salmon; Trout
- Revenue: ▲NOK 536 million
- Operating income: NOK 170 million
- Number of employees: 410 (2007)
- Website: www.griegseafood.no

Grieg Seafood (OSE: GSF) is an international seafood company with fish farms in Rogaland and Finnmark in Norway, British Columbia and Shetland. In July 2025 the company announced that it was selling its salmon-farming operations in Canada to Cermaq. The company specializes in fresh Atlantic salmon. It has an annual production of 80,000 tonnes of salmon and trout. The company is based in Bergen, Norway, and listed on the Oslo Stock Exchange.

The company was listed on 20 July 2007. The largest owners are Grieg Holdings (40.63%) and Halde Invest (20.54%). The corporation was previously a subsidiary of the Grieg Group, and is still co-located with its largest owner in Downtown Bergen. In 2006, the company performed a merger with Volden Group and has previously also operated in Denmark and Chile.

The company is "licensed to produce 23,400 tonnes of salmon annually to North American and Asian markets." The Global Aquaculture Alliance, a standards-setting organization for seafood, has awarded Grieg Seafood as Best Aquaculture Practices (BAP).

Together with Marine Harvest and Cermaq, Grieg controls more than 90% of the salmon farming industry in British Columbia, Canada.
