= Erik Bødtker Øyno =

Norwegian businessman (born 1965)

- Born: 1965 (age 60–61); Norway
- Education: Norwegian School of Economics and Business Administration
- Occupation: Businessperson
- Known for: CEO of Aktiv Kapital

Erik Bødtker Øyno (born 1965) is a Norwegian businessperson and chief executive officer of Aktiv Kapital.

Øyno holds a siviløkonom degree from the Norwegian School of Economics and Business Administration, and has been CEO of Byggmakker and director of investments at ABN Amro.
