= SpareBank 1 Nøtterøy–Tønsberg =

Norwegian savings bank

SpareBank 1 Nøtterøy-Tønsberg
- Type: Savings bank
- Traded as: OSE: NTSG
- ISIN: NO0010391295
- Industry: Financial services
- Founded: 1857
- Fate: Merged with SpareBank 1 Sørøst-Norge
- Headquarters: Nøtterøy, Norway
- Area served: Vestfold
- Website: www.sparebank1.no/notteroy-tonsberg

SpareBank 1 Nøtterøy–Tønsberg was a Norwegian savings bank, headquartered in Nøtterøy, Norway. The banks main market is Vestfold. The history of the bank goes back to 20 June 1857 with the establishment of the first savings bank in Nøtterøy.

SpareBank 1 Nøtterøy–Tønsberg was merged with SpareBank 1 Sørøst-Norge and later became SpareBank 1 Sør-Norge.
