= American Shipping Company =

- Type: Public company
- Industry: Shipping; Shipyard
- Founded: 1996
- Headquarters: Oslo, Norway
- Area served: United States
- Key people: Dave Meehan (CEO)
- Revenue: US$254 million (2005)
- Operating income: $13 million (2005)
- Net income: $9 million (2005)
- Number of employees: 1,300 (November, 2007)
- Website: www.akership.com

Aker American Shipping logo

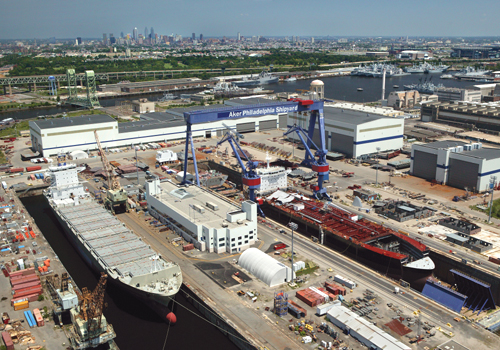
Aker American Shipping shipyard

American Shipping Company ASA (OSE: AMSC), formerly known as Aker American Shipping ASA, is a Norwegian-American shipping and shipyard company and part of the Aker Group. Aker ASA originally owned 53.2% of the company, and in 2008 reduced its ownership share to 19.9%.

The company is listed on the Oslo Stock Exchange and is headquartered in Oslo, Norway. It was reported in November 2007 that the company has approximately 1,300 employees.

== Overview ==
American Shipping Company consists of the shipyard, Aker Philadelphia Shipyard, and the shipping company, American Shipping Corporation (ASC). Aker American Shipping builds merchant vessels for companies operating under the Jones Act, and through its subsidiaries, owns and leases those ships as well.

The Jones Act requires all water transport between US ports to be operated by US-flag ships and requires US-flag ships to be built in US shipyards, owned by US citizens, and operated by an American crew.

== History ==
Aker Philadelphia Shipyard, originally Kværner Philadelphia Shipyard, began as a product of a partnership of public and private investments used to rebuild and convert 110 acres (0.45 km^{2}) of the former Philadelphia Naval Shipyard, which was closed in 1995. After the acquisition of Kværner, Aker took ownership of the yard.

In 2006, Aker Philadelphia Shipyard delivered the final vessel in a four-ship series of containerships to Matson Navigation Company. With that, the yard transitioned to building a series of Veteran Class MT46 double-hulled product tankers for bareboat charter to Overseas Shipholding Group, a build program that extends into 2012.

== Fleet ==
- Overseas Houston
- Overseas Long Beach
- Overseas Los Angeles
- Overseas New York
- Overseas Texas City
