= SpareBank 1 BV =

Norwegian bank

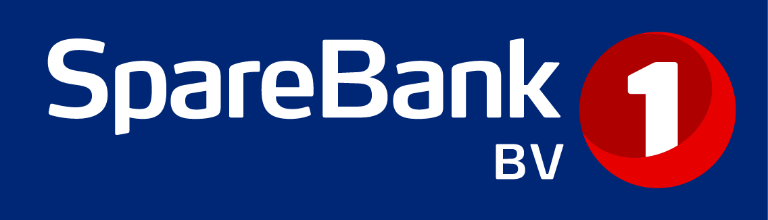
- Company type: Savings bank
- Traded as: OSE: SBVG
- Industry: Financial services
- Founded: 1883
- Headquarters: Sandefjord, Norway
- Area served: Buskerud; Vestfold
- Website: www.sparebank1.no/buskerud-vestfold

SpareBank 1 BV was a Norwegian savings bank, headquartered in Sandefjord, Norway. The banks main market was Buskerud and Vestfold. The banks history can be traced back to 1883 with the establishment of Sandsvær Sparebank.

Sparebank 1 BV was merged with SpareBank 1 Telemark to become SpareBank 1 Sørøst-Norge on 1 June 2021. Eventually, SpareBank 1 Sørøst-Norge became SpareBank 1 Sør-Norge in 2024.
