= Green Reefers =

Norwegian shipping company

Green Reefers ASA
- Type: Public
- Industry: Shipping
- Headquarters: Bergen, Norway
- Area served: Atlantic
- Key people: Erik Thulin (CEO)
- Revenue: ▲US$ 158 million (2006)
- Operating income: US$ 5.7 million (2006)
- Net income: US$ -1.2 million (2006)
- Website: www.greenreefers.no

Green Reefers (OSE: GRR) is a Norwegian shipping company that owns 24 and operates 5 reefers (refrigerated ships). Based in Bergen, the company operates throughout the North Atlantic, with terminals located in Swinoujscie (Poland), Kaliningrad (Russia), Klaipėda (Lithuania), and in Måløy and Træna (Norway).

The company used to be listed on the Oslo Stock Exchange, and was fully owned by the Caiano Group. The main cargoes include fish from Northern Europe, juice from Florida, fruits from the United States and meat from Brazil to Russia.

The company ceased operations in May 2012, and was delisted from the Oslo Stock Exchange.
