= Avocet Mining =

- Type: Public
- Traded as: LSE: AVM; OSE: AVM
- Industry: Mining
- Founded: 1995
- Headquarters: London, UK
- Key people: Russell Edey, (Chairman); David Cather, (CEO)
- Revenue: US$85.0 million (2015)
- Operating income: US$(52.5) million (2015)
- Net income: US$49.7 million (2015)
- Number of employees: 600
- Website: www.avocetmining.com

Avocet Mining plc is a West African-focussed gold mining and exploration company with its primary operations in Burkina Faso and Guinea. The company is listed on the London Stock Exchange and the Oslo Børs.

== History ==
Avocet Mining was formed in 1995 and a year later listed on LSE with a market capitalisation of £72m with gold deposits in Peru, tungsten interests in Portugal, Peru and California and an operating gold mine in Penjom, Malaysia. In 1999 the Company divested tungsten operations to focus on gold. Avocet moved onto the AIM market in 2002, with a market capitalisation of £12m. In the same year the Company acquired 80% in North Lanut, Indonesia and a 49% interest and management control in gold mining company ZGC in Tajikistan which was later disposed of in 2007. In 2008 Avocet acquired the Seruyung gold exploration project in Kalimantan, Indonesia. 2009 saw the Company acquire Wega Mining and the Inata gold project in Burkina Faso, the Company poured its first gold later that year. Avocet listed on the Oslo Axess list of the OSE in 2010 while disposing of the Houndé licences in Burkina Faso to Avion. The Company disposed of all its South East Asian assets in 2010. In May 2011 the company had to halt operations at the Inata mine due to "illegal labour unrest". Later the same year, Avocet Mining listed on the Main Market of the LSE.

== Operations ==
The company operates a gold mine at Inata in the north of Burkina Faso. Management intend to expand the mine at Inata in late 2012 such that gold production can start at the new facilities in late 2013. The Company has a pipeline of exploration projects across 21 exploration licenses in Burkina Faso and Guinea. Avocet Mining's exploration licences at Bélahouro in Burkina Faso cover approximately 1,660 km2, whilst at its other main project, Tri-K in Guinea, it has an exploration license covering approximately 986 km2.

All of Avocet's exploration mining licenses are located within the prospective Birimian greenstone belt that dominates West Africa's geological landscape.

Avocet Mining plc operations.

Burkina Faso

Avocet Mining’s operations in Burkina Faso are located within a 1,660 km2 land package in the Bélahouro district approximately 220 kilometres north-east of the capital, Ouagadougou.

Outside of the Inata Gold mine license area, Avocet Mining has exploration permits over a large land package broadly known as Bélahouro. Extensive exploration work is ongoing within this area.

Guinea

Avocet Mining has a number of development projects across twelve exploration licences in Guinea. These include the 986km2 Tri-K Block, consisting of eight exploration licences across the Koulékoun, Kodiéran and Kodiafaran gold prospects.

The most advanced is Koulékoun with a Mineral Resource of 2.15 million ounces which is currently undergoing a feasibility study. The exploration licences in Guinea are 100% owned by Avocet Mining.

== Production ==
Within Avocet’s Inata mine license area, a Mineral Resource of 3.985 million ounces and a Mineral Reserve of 1.85 million ounces has been proven. At the Souma project, which is within the Bélahouro region but outside of the Inata mine license area, a further Mineral Resource 0.56 million ounces has been defined. The Inata mine produced 167,000 ounces of gold in 2011. In 2012, the Inata mine was expected to produce approximately 135,000 to 140,000 ounces of gold.

An exploration programme in the Tri-K Block of permits in Guinea is ongoing and is focused on three main licences - Koulékoun, Kodiéran and Kodiafaran. The most advanced of these is Koulékoun with a Mineral Resource estimate of 2.15 million ounces. Kodiéran is the second largest with a maiden Mineral Resource of 0.87 million ounces.
