= Rogaland Sparebank =

Bank

- Company type: Savings bank
- Traded as: OSE: SADG
- Industry: Financial services
- Founded: 1875
- Headquarters: Sandnes, Norway
- Area served: Rogaland
- Number of employees: 162 (2026)
- Website: www.rogalandsparebank.no

Rogaland Sparebank is a Norwegian savings bank, headquartered in Sandnes, Norway. The banks main market is Rogaland. The bank was established in 1875 as Sandnes Sparebank and was listed on the Oslo Stock Exchange in 1995. In 2024 Sandnes Sparebank and Hjelmeland Sparebank where merged and changed name to Rogaland Sparebank.
