= OBX Index =

Blue-chip index on the Oslo Stock Exchange

The OBX Index is a stock market index which lists the 25 most liquid companies on the main index of the Oslo Stock Exchange in Norway. All stocks on the OBX list can be traded with options and futures. The companies on the OBX list are rotated twice a year, on the third Friday of June and December.

== List of companies in the index ==
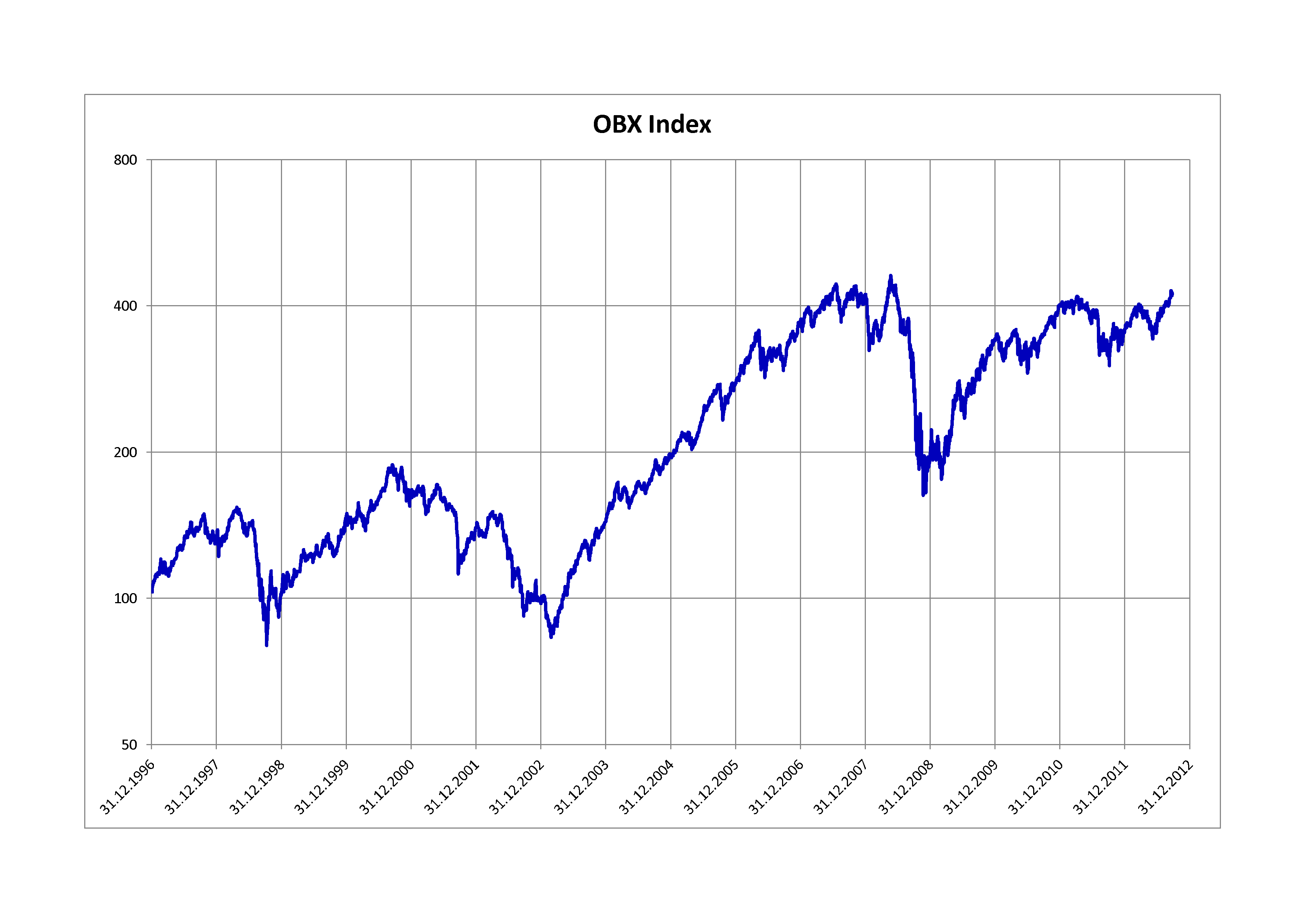
OBX Index 1996–2012

OBX Index 2004–2023, semi-log

The following 25 companies constitute the OBX list as of the semi-annual review effective 23 September 2024.

Company	ICB subsector	Ticker symbol	Index weighting (%)
Aker BP	oil: crude producers	OSE: AKRBP	5.60
BW LPG	marine transportation	OSE: BWLPG	0.97
DNB Bank	banks	OSE: DNB	10.43
Equinor	integrated oil and gas	OSE: EQNR	14.89
Frontline	marine transportation	OSE: FRO	1.66
Gjensidige Forsikring	full line insurance	OSE: GJF	3.19
Golden Ocean Group	marine transportation	OSE: GOGL	0.74
Hafnia Limited	marine transportation	OSE: HAFNI	1.44
Höegh Autoliners ASA	marine transportation	OSE: HAUTO	1.09
Kongsberg Gruppen	diversified industrials	OSE: KOG	8.11
Mowi	farming, fishing, ranching and plantations	OSE: MOWI	6.65
MPC Container Ships	marine transportation	OSE: MPCC	0.69
Nordic Semiconductor	semiconductors	OSE: NOD	1.52
Norsk Hydro	aluminum	OSE: NHY	7.07
Norwegian Air Shuttle	airlines	OSE: NAS	0.61
Orkla	food products	OSE: ORK	6.09
SalMar	farming, fishing, ranching and plantations	OSE: SALM	3.28
Storebrand	life insurance	OSE: STB	4.50
Subsea 7	oil equipment and services	OSE: SUBC	2.98
Telenor	telecommunications services	OSE: TEL	6.34
TGS ASA	oil equipment and services	OSE: TGS	1.58
Tomra Systems	machinery: industrial	OSE: TOM	2.85
Vår Energi ASA	offshore drilling and other services	OSE: VAR	2.38
Wallenius Wilhelmsen	marine transportation	OSE: WAWI	0.99
Yara International	fertilizers	OSE: YAR	4.34

== History ==
In 2003 the index showed 100 points. In May 2008 it showed 522 points.

=== Biggest drop in one day ===
The worst performing days for the OBX Index are:

Rank	Date	Drop (%)	Circumstance	Ref.
1	October 20, 1987	-19.11	since labelled "Black Tuesday"	
2	August 1991			
3	October 6, 2008	-9.71	in conjunction with the 2008 financial crisis	
4	October 24, 2008	-9.24	in conjunction with the global liquidity crisis	
5	October 15, 2008	-8.81	in conjunction with the global liquidity crisis	
6	September 29, 2008	-8.3	in conjunction with the global liquidity crisis	
7	October 16, 2008	-7.95	in conjunction with the global liquidity crisis	
8	October 10, 2008	-7.7	in conjunction with the global liquidity crisis	
9	November 12, 2008	-7.45	in conjunction with the global liquidity crisis	
10	October 8, 2008	-6.44	in conjunction with the global liquidity crisis	
11	January 21, 2008	-6.4		
12	September 9, 2008	-5.57	in conjunction with the global liquidity crisis	
13	June 29, 2010	-5.28		

== See also ==
- List of companies listed on the Oslo Stock Exchange
- OSEAX
