= Bank Norwegian =

Norwegian digital bank

Bank Norwegian – a branch of NOBA Bank Group
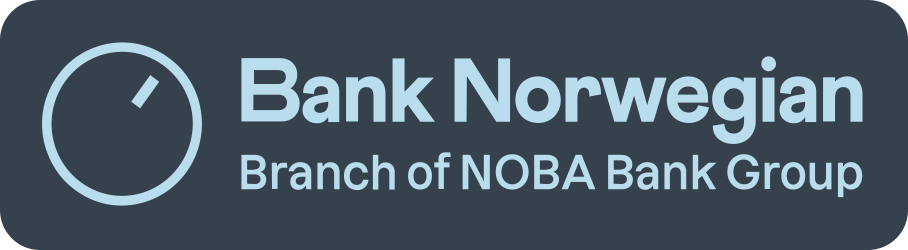
- Native name: Bank Norwegian, en filial av NOBA Bank Group AB (publ)
- Type: Privately held company
- Industry: Bank
- Founded: 2007
- Headquarters: Fornebu, Norway
- Area served: Norway; Sweden; Finland; Denmark; Germany; Spain
- Key people: Jacob Lundblad (CEO); Mats Benserud (Branch manager)
- Products: Consumer loan, deposit and credit card
- Revenue: ▲NOK 1,5 billion (2015)
- Operating income: 54,100,000 Norwegian krone
- Net income: ▲NOK 539 million (2015)
- Total assets: ▲NOK 17,5 billion (2015)
- Total equity: ▲NOK 1,7 billion (2015)
- Number of employees: 160 (2022)
- Parent: NOBA Bank Group AB (publ)
- Website: banknorwegian.no

Bank Norwegian is a Norwegian digital bank which provides loans, credit cards and savings accounts to consumers. The company was founded in November 2007 and is headquartered at Fornebu, Norway. It has customers in Norway, Sweden, Denmark, Finland, Germany and Spain. Bank Norwegian cooperates with Norwegian Air Shuttle ASA on their loyalty program in selected markets. In 2021, the bank had more than 1.7 million customers.

== History ==
In May 2007, Norwegian announced that they planned to enter the banking sector, with Erik Jensen as CEO of the new company, Bank Norwegian. Jensen was previously CEO of yA Bank og Forsikring AS (yA Bank and Insurance). In September 2007, Bank Norwegian received a commercial bank operating license from the Norwegian Ministry of Finance. In October 2007 Norwegian announced that they planned to start a combined credit and bonus card program (Norwegian Reward) with up to 20% bonus for international flights and 1% of the purchase price on all credit purchases. The bank began providing services in Sweden in May 2013 and in Denmark and Finland in December 2015. On 19 August 2019, Bank Norwegian's parent company Bank Norwegian ASA (Previously Norwegian Finans Holding ASA) announced that Norwegian Air Shuttle had sold its entire shareholding in the company to Cidron Xingu Limited. Bank Norwegian was listed on the Oslo Stock Exchange from 17 June 2016.

In November 2021, Nordax Bank AB completed acquisition of Bank Norwegian after a bidding process, and the company was delisted from the Oslo Stock Exchange on 15 November 2021. On 30 November, the merger between the two banks was completed. Jacob Lundblad is the current CEO.
