= Jæren Sparebank =

Norwegian bank

- Company type: Savings bank
- Traded as: OSE: JAEREN
- Industry: Financial services
- Founded: 1923
- Headquarters: Bryne, Norway
- Area served: Rogaland
- Number of employees: 114 (2026)
- Website: www.jaerensparebank.no

Jæren Sparebank is a Norwegian savings bank, headquartered in Bryne, Norway. The bank's main market is Rogaland.

The bank is one of the owners of Eika Gruppen.
