= Faktor Eiendom =

Norwegian construction company

Faktor Eiendom ASA
- Company type: Public (OSE: FAKTOR
- Industry: Construction
- Founded: 2001
- Defunct: 2011
- Headquarters: Rakkestad, Norway
- Area served: Scandinavia
- Key people: Per Gunnar Rymer (CEO); Jon Sandberg (Chairman)
- Revenue: ▼NOK 657 million (2010)
- Operating income: ▼NOK (434 million) (2010)
- Net income: ▼NOK (523 million) (2010)
- Number of employees: 674 (2010)
- Website: www.faktoreiendom.no

Faktor Eiendom is a Norwegian construction company that is engaged in building residential and recreational houses, factory production of low-cost housing (e.g. student flats), and managing hotels and resorts. The Company experienced serious liquidity problems in 2010 which resulted in DnB NOR converting NOK 250 million of debt into equity and taking 30.7% ownership of the company. After taking office in Q4 2010, CEO Per Gunnar Rymer has turned the strategy of the company towards real-estate development and factory production of houses and flats.

Faktor Eiendom was taken under bankruptcy proceedings by a court order of 27 September 2011.
