= Skue Sparebank =

Norwegian savings bank

- Type: Savings bank
- Traded as: OSE: SKUE
- Industry: Financial services
- Founded: 1842
- Headquarters: Nesbyen, Norway
- Area served: Buskerud
- Number of employees: 147 (2026)
- Website: www.indresognsparebank.no

Skue Sparebank is a Norwegian savings bank, headquartered in Nesbyen, Norway. The banks main market is Buskerud. The banks history goes back to 1842 with the establishment of Nes Prestegjelds Sparebank.
