= Abraham Odfjell =

Norwegian ship owner

Abraham (Abram) Odfjell (21 June 1881 – 31 August 1960) was a Norwegian ship owner who in his spare time was a noted philatelist who was added to the Roll of Distinguished Philatelists in 1951.

== Shipping ==
Odfjell was born in Stavanger in 1881 and rose from seaman to captain of his own ship before entering the shipping business on his own account in 1914. By the time of his death he had developed an extensive shipping business in Norway and North and South America.

== Philately ==
In addition to forming a fine collection of the stamps of Norway, Odfjell formed gold medal winning collections of Sudan, Afghanistan, Mexico and the Netherlands.
