= Høland og Setskog Sparebank =

Norwegian savings bank

- Company type: Savings bank
- Traded as: OSE: HSPG
- Industry: Financial services
- Founded: 1849
- Headquarters: Bjørkelangen, Norway
- Area served: Akershus
- Number of employees: 42 (2026)
- Website: www.hsbank.no

Hølaand og Setskog Sparebank is a Norwegian savings bank, headquartered in Bjørkelangen, Norway. The banks main market is Akershus. The banks history goes back to 1849, with the establishment of Høland Præstgjelds Sparebank in December of that year.
