= Totens Sparebank =

Norwegian savings bank

- Company type: Savings bank
- Traded as: OSE: TOTG
- ISIN: NO0006001205
- Industry: Financial services
- Founded: 1854
- Headquarters: Lena, Norway
- Area served: Innlandet
- Website: www.totenbanken.no

Totens Sparebank is a Norwegian savings bank, headquartered in Lena, Norway. The banks main market is Innlandet. The bank was established in 1854.

Totens Sparebank is the largest owner of Eika Gruppen.
