= InterOil Exploration and Production =

InterOil Exploration and Production ASA
- Type: Public (OSE: IOX)
- Industry: Petroleum
- Founded: 2005
- Headquarters: Oslo, Norway
- Area served: Norway
- Key people: Tom Wolden (CEO); Mårten Rød (Chairman)
- Revenue: ▲US$41.2 million (2006)
- Number of employees: 178 (2007)
- Website: www.interoil.no

InterOil Exploration and Production is a Norwegian petroleum company with operations in Peru, Colombia . The company is traded on the Oslo Stock Exchange.

== See also ==
- List of petroleum companies
