= SpareBank 1 Østfold Akershus =

Norwegian savings bank

- Company type: Savings bank
- Traded as: OSE: SOAG
- Industry: Financial services
- Founded: 2011
- Headquarters: Moss, Norway
- Area served: Østfold; Akershus
- Website: www.sparebank1oa.no

SpareBank 1 Østfold Akershus is a Norwegian savings bank, headquartered in Moss, Norway. The banks main market is Østfold and Akershus. The history of the bank can be traced back to 1835.
