= Voss Veksel- og Landmandsbank =

Commercial bank in Voss, Vestland, Norway

Voss Veksel- og Landmandsbank ASA
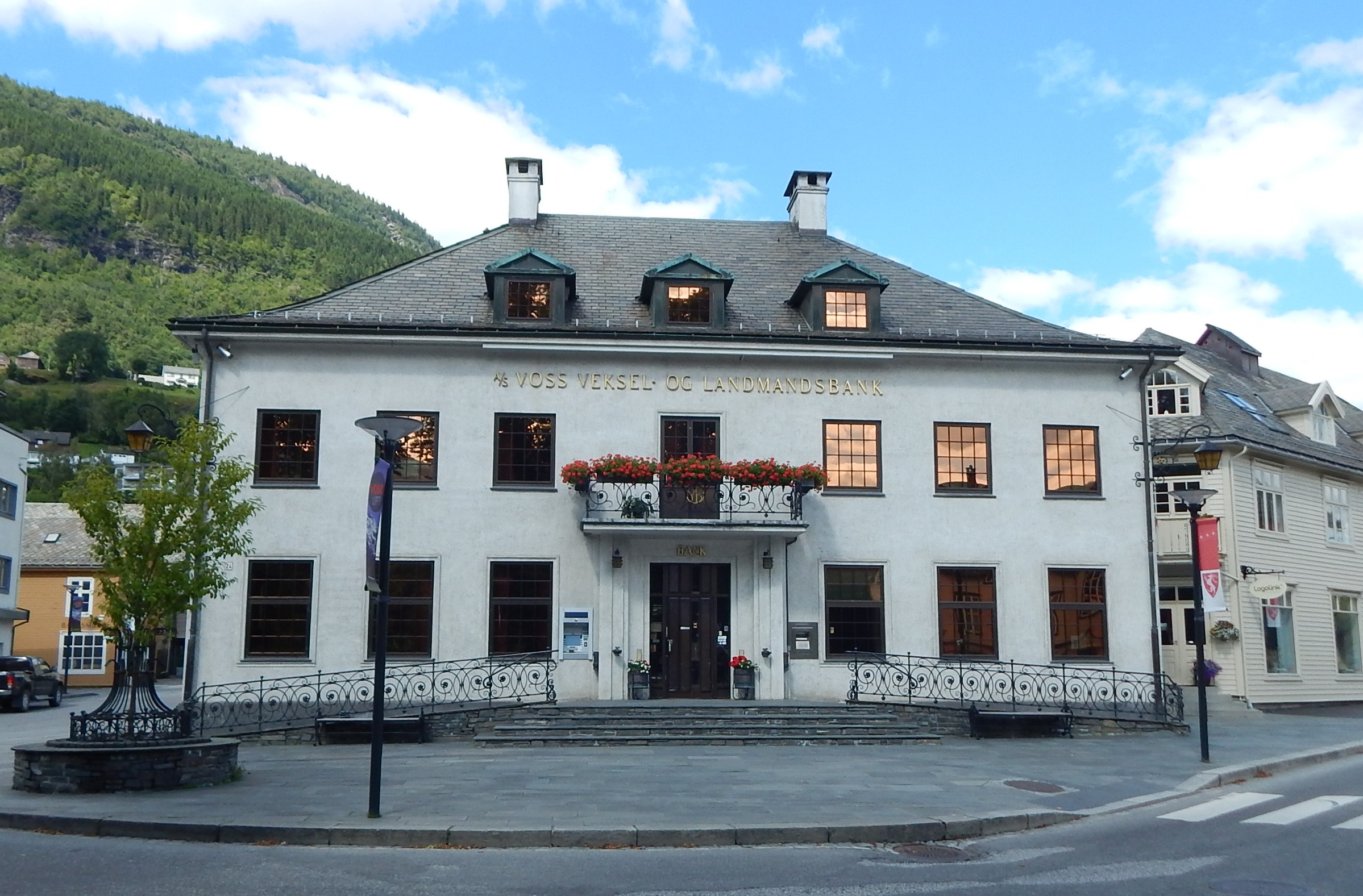
- Type: Public
- Industry: Banking
- Founded: 1899
- Headquarters: Voss Municipality, Norway
- Area served: Voss, Norway
- Number of employees: 32 (2026)
- Website: http://www.vekselbanken.no

Voss Veksel- og Landmandsbank (OSE: VVL) or Vekselbanken is a Norwegian commercial bank located in Vossavangen in Voss Municipality. It is the only remaining independent commercial bank that had not merged into DnB NOR, Nordea, Fokus Bank or a sparebank.

== History ==
The bank is listed on the Oslo Stock Exchange and was founded in 1899 to provide services to the labourers working on building the Bergen Line through Voss.
