= SpareBank 1 Ringerike Hadeland =

Norwegian savings bank

- Company type: Savings bank
- Traded as: OSE: RING
- Industry: Financial services
- Founded: 2010
- Headquarters: Hønefoss, Norway
- Area served: Buskerud; Oppland
- Number of employees: 250
- Website: www.rhbank.no

SpareBank 1 Ringerike Hadeland is a Norwegian savings bank, headquartered in Hønefoss, Norway. The bank's main market is Ringerike in Buskerud and the Hadeland district of Oppland. The history of the bank goes back to 4 August 1833 with the establishment of Ringerikes Sparebank.
