= Aurskog Sparebank =

Norwegian savings bank

- Company type: Savings bank
- Traded as: OSE: AURG
- Industry: Financial services
- Founded: 1846
- Headquarters: Aurskog, Norway
- Area served: Akershus
- Number of employees: 88 (2026)
- Website: www.aurskog-sparebank.no

Aurskog Sparebank is a Norwegian savings bank, headquartered in Aurskog, Norway. The banks main market is the Romerike district of Akershus. The banks equity certificates was listed on Oslo Stock Exchange in 1998.

Aurskog Sparebank is one of the owners of Eika Gruppen.
