= Odfjell Drilling =

Global leader in harsh-environment drilling

Odfjell Drilling Ltd
- Type: Public
- Traded as: OSE: ODL.OL
- Industry: Oil and Gas
- Founded: 1973; 53 years ago
- Headquarters: Aberdeen; Bergen
- Key people: Kjetil Gjersdal (CEO)
- Services: Offshore drilling services
- Number of employees: 1600+
- Website: www.odfjelldrilling.com

Odfjell Drilling is an international drilling company that was listed on the Oslo Stock Exchange on 27 September 2013. Odfjell Drilling was founded in 1973 but has maritime roots dating back to 1914 and experience in the petroleum industry that began in the mid-1960s.

== Ownership ==
The company was owned by Abraham Odfjell until he transferred ownership to his daughters, Helene Odfjell and Marianne Odfjell, in 2007. They owned the company until 27 September 2013, when it was listed on the Oslo Stock Exchange under the ticker symbol ODL.

In March 2022, Odfjell Drilling underwent a reorganisation, splitting into two separate entities: Odfjell Drilling and Odfjell Technology. Odfjell Technology took over the well services, engineering, and platform drilling segments, while Odfjell Drilling continued to focus on drilling operations.

== Leadership ==
The company is led by Kjetil Gjersdal, who has served as CEO since March 2022. Gjersdal has been with Odfjell Drilling since 2000.

== Operations ==
Odfjell Drilling's fleet of semi-submersible drilling rigs operates in harsh environments in several regions worldwide, including the North Sea, West of Shetland, the Barents Sea, and deepwater areas off South Africa. These rigs are designed to withstand extreme conditions.
