= Carasent =

- Founded: 2012
- Headquarters: Gothenburg, Sweden
- Website: carasent.com

Carasent AB is a Nordic public IT company that develops and delivers digital solutions for the healthcare sector, with a particular focus on operational support and electronic health record (EHR) systems for private healthcare providers. The company is listed on the Nasdaq First North Growth Market and is headquartered in Gothenburg, Sweden.

The company’s most widely known product is Webdoc, a cloud-based electronic health record system used by more than 800 healthcare providers in the Nordic region. Carasent’s product portfolio also includes the EHR systems Metodika, Ad Curis, and Ad Opus, the decision support system Medrave, and the occupational health platform HPI Plustoo.

== History ==
The company was originally listed on the Oslo Stock Exchange as Carasent ASA. In 2024, a merger was carried out in which Carasent AB became the acquiring company, and the share listing was transferred to Nasdaq Stockholm.

Since 2018, Carasent has completed several acquisitions, including Evimeria AB (2018), Avans Soma (2020) , Metodika (2021), Medrave (2022), Health Profile Institute (2022), and the German electronic health record provider Data-AL GmbH (2024).
