= Aktiv Kapital =

Norwegian Company

Aktiv Kapital ASA
- Type: Public (OSE: AIK)
- Industry: Financial services
- Founded: 1991
- Headquarters: Oslo, Norway
- Key people: Geir Langfeldt Olsen (CEO); Fredrik Halvorsen (Chair)
- Services: Debt buyer
- Website: www.aktivkapital.com

Aktiv Kapital ASA is a Norwegian debt investment company with operations in nine countries. It is the largest purchaser of non-performing consumer credits in Europe and Canada. The company purchases assets from banks and other financial institutions, adding value for lenders through unique insights, flexible approach and international presence. The company was founded in 1991 and has grown through a number of acquisitions. It is listed on the Oslo Stock Exchange and controlled by John Fredriksen.

July 16, 2014 Portfolio Recovery Associates completed a $1.3 billion acquisition of Aktiv Kapital AS, and they are now known as PRA Group.
