= Oslo Stock Exchange =

Stock exchange located in Oslo, Norway

Oslo Børs ASA
- Euronext Oslo Børs

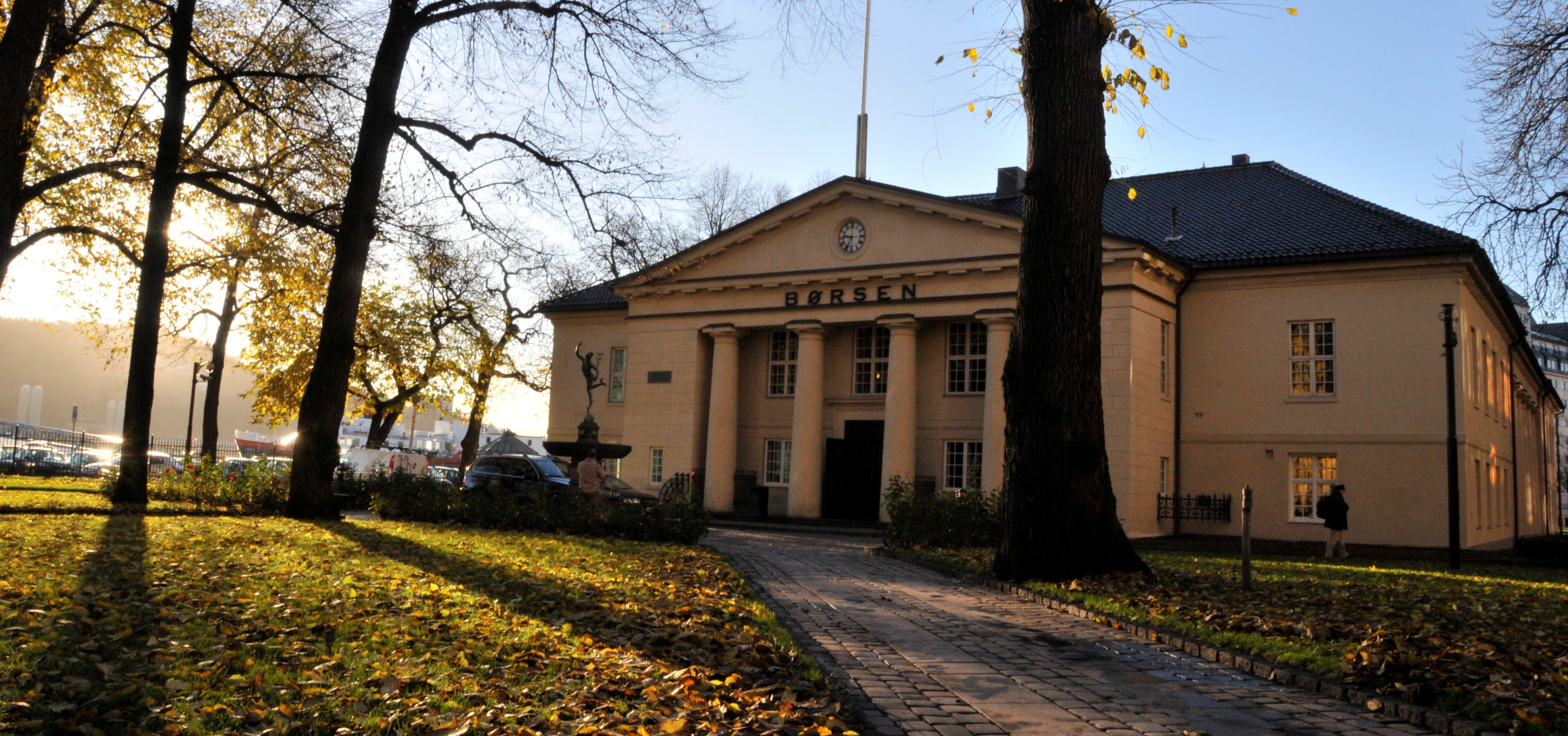
- Type: Stock exchange
- Location: Oslo, Norway
- Coordinates: 59°54′31.31″N 10°44′52.06″E
- Founded: 1819; 207 years ago
- Owner: Euronext
- Key people: Øivind Amundsen (CEO)
- No. of listings: 346 (May 2022)
- Market cap: USD 295.55 billion (March 2022)
- Volume: NOK 4.6 billion (2017)
- Indices: OBX, OSEAX
- Website: www.euronext.com/en/markets/oslo

Oslo Stock Exchange (Norwegian: Oslo Børs) (OSE: OSLO) is a stock exchange within the Nordic countries and offers Norway's only regulated markets for securities trading today. The stock exchange offers a full product range including equities, derivatives and fixed income instruments.

The Euronext consortium of European stock exchanges controls Oslo Stock Exchange as of June 2019.

== History ==
Oslo Børs was established by a law of September 18, 1818. Trading on Oslo Børs commenced on April 15, 1819.

In 1881, Oslo Børs became a stock exchange, which means securities were listed. The first listing of securities contained 16 bond series and 23 stocks, including the Norwegian central bank (Norges Bank).

Oslo Børs cooperates with London Stock Exchange on trading systems. The exchange has also a partnership with the stock exchanges in Singapore and Toronto (Canada) for a secondary listing of companies.

The stock exchange was privatized in 2001, and is, after the merger in 2007, 100% owned by Oslo Børs VPS Holding ASA.

Oslo Børs Holding ASA was the holding company that owned Oslo Stock Exchange of Norway from 2001 to 2008. The company was created in 2001 when the Oslo Stock Exchange was converted from a self-owning institution to a public limited company. The ownership of Oslo Børs Holding was spread out between a large number of owners, the largest being DnB NOR (18%). The Nordic stock exchange group OMX held a 10% stake as well. The company was not publicly listed. In 2008 it merged with Verdipapirsentralen ASA (VPS) to create the new holding company Oslo Børs VPS Holding ASA.

Oslo Børs Holding had two subsidiaries, Oslo Børs ASA that operates the stock exchange and Oslo Børs Informasjon AS that manages the information systems of the exchange.

== Oslo Access ==
Oslo Axess is a regulated and licensed market under the auspices of the Oslo Stock Exchange. The purpose is to promote growth among smaller companies, and give them the benefits achieved by having shares traded on a regulated market.

=== General ===
Oslo Axess is intended for companies seeking listing on a regulated market, but that does not meet the requirements for listing on the Oslo Stock Exchange. Oslo Axess operates with the same prices for trade as the Oslo Stock Exchange.

=== Licensing ===
Oslo Axess has a license from the Ministry of Finance to act as a regulated marketplace for trading in Norway . Basically, the same laws as the Oslo Stock Exchange. The first working day of the Oslo Axess was 2 May 2007.

== Shares ==
Norwegian public limited companies and equivalent foreign companies can apply for their shares to be listed on Oslo Børs or Oslo Axess. It is up to the company itself to apply to be admitted to trading, but the company must meet the applicable requirements, which include the number of owners (range), number of shares, market value and history. To be listed the exchange includes strict requirements on the treatment of confidential information. Companies that meet the requirements for listing can much easier get access to capital through share issues. Many investors only invest in securities listed on a stock exchange, because those papers are easier to sell.

== Indices ==
OBX – The index comprises the 25 most traded shares listed on Oslo Børs. The OBX index is tradable, meaning that you can buy and sell listed futures and options on the index. Put another way, you can get the same exposure by purchasing an index product as if you buy all the shares (weighted) included in the index. The rating is based on a six-month trading period. The index is adjusted every third Friday in June and December. OSEBX – The Oslo Børs Benchmark Index (Norwegian: Hovedindeks) is an investable index containing a representative selection of all listed shares on Oslo Børs. The OSEBX is revised on a half year basis and the changes are implemented on December 1 and June 1. OSEFX – The Oslo Børs Mutual Fund Index (Norwegian: Fondsindeks) has the same constituents as OSEBX but applies a weight capping to comply with UCITS.

== Building ==
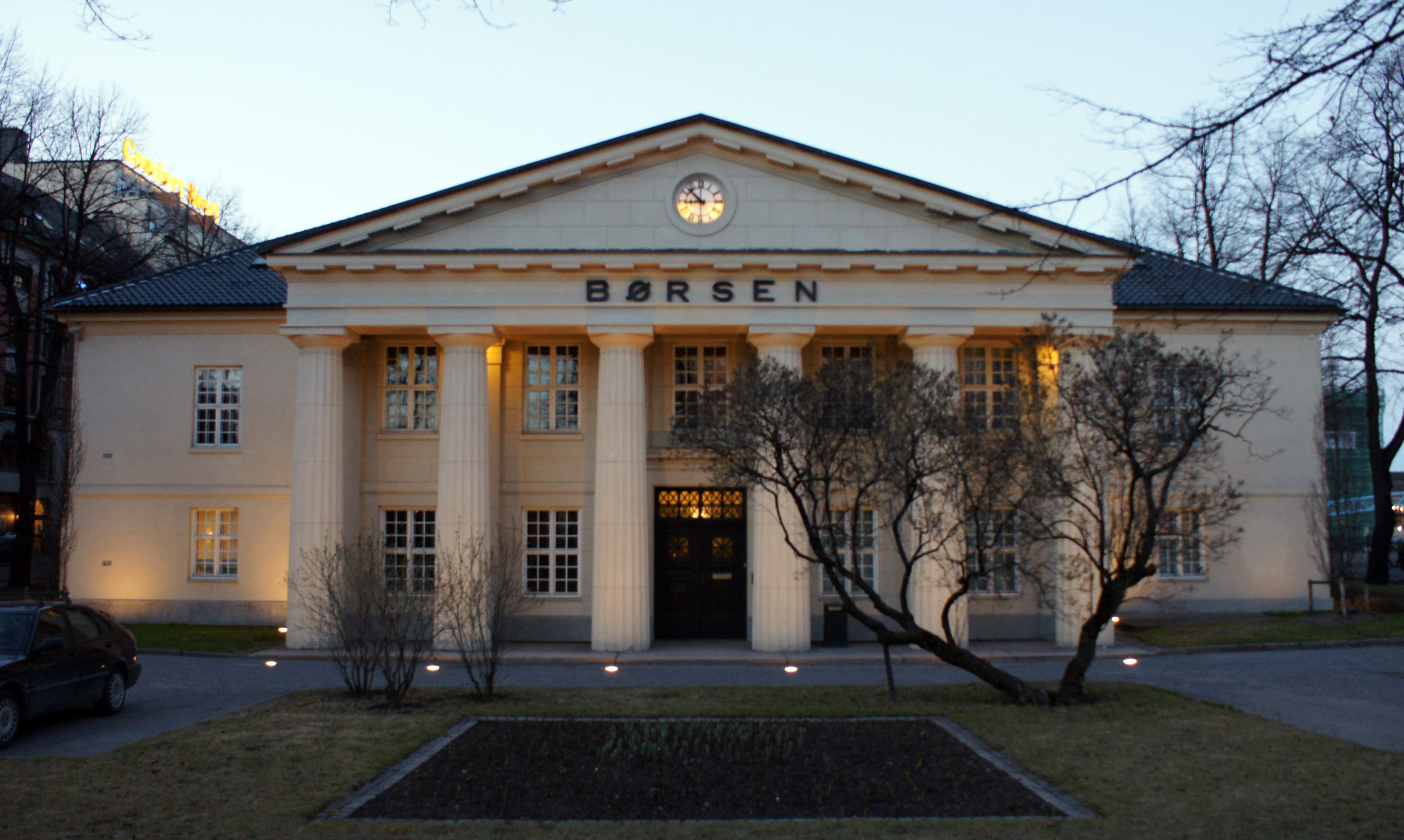
Oslo Børs Building 2014

The over 190-year-old stock exchange building has been the subject of many long debates about how the building should be managed and designed over the years. Several of Christiania's (the name of Oslo between 1624 and 1925) best known business men fought for years to get approved and funded the construction of a stock exchange in Christiania, the capital of Norway from 1814.

In 1823, a building committee was appointed to consider the various suggested drawings at the time. The committee chose the architect Christian H. Grosch's proposal. On July 14, 1826, the Ministry approved the final plans of drawings and budgets. In 1828, it was called Norway's first monumental building, completed on the site called Grønningen, the first public park in Christiania.

== See also ==
- List of companies listed on the Oslo Stock Exchange
- List of European stock exchanges
- Oslo Børs Holding
