= List of freight ship companies =

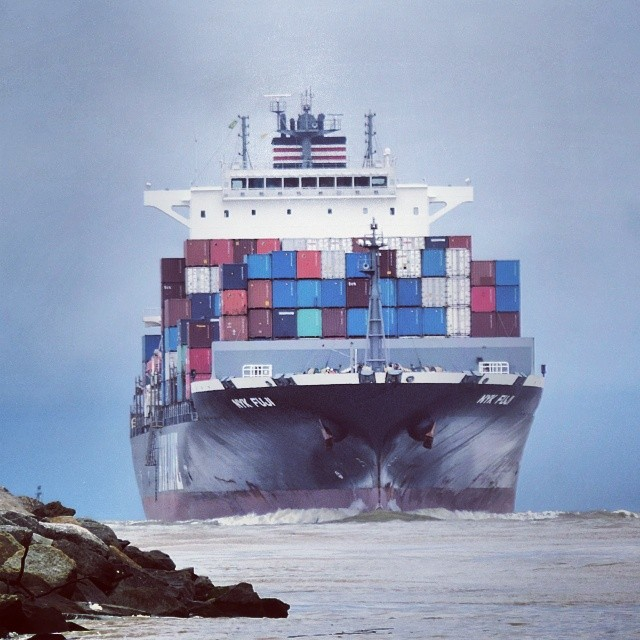
Sea freight transport by container ship

This list of freight ship companies is arranged by country. Companies listed own and/or operate bulk carriers, car carriers, container ships, Roll-on/roll-off (for freight), and tankers. For a list of companies that own and operate passenger ships (cruise ships, cargo-passenger ships, and ferries), see List of passenger ship companies.

Key
" " - Call sign or common name, ( ) - Parent company or conglomerate, > - Previous company name, >> - Company name in local language

BC - Bulk carriers, CC - Car carriers, CS - Container ships, RR - Roll-on/Roll-off (for freight), TK - Tankers

== Africa ==
=== Ethiopia ===
- Ethiopian Shipping Lines

=== South Africa ===
- Safmarine (Maersk, Denmark)

=== Tanzania ===
- Marine Services Company

== Asia ==
=== Azerbaijan ===
- Azerbaijan Caspian Shipping Company

=== Bangladesh ===
- Bangladesh Shipping Corporation (State-owned enterprise)

=== China ===
==== Mainland China ====
- China COSCO Shipping "COSCO" (State-owned enterprise)
- Sinotrans (HK) Shipping "Sinotrans" (State-owned enterprise)

==== Hong Kong ====
- Anglo-Eastern Group
- Fleet Management Limited
- The China Navigation Company (Swire Group, UK)
- Jinhui Shipping and Transport (Jinhui Holdings)
- Orient Overseas Container Line "OOCL"
- Pacific Basin Shipping Limited

=== India ===
- Mercator Limited
- Shipping Corporation of India (State-owned enterprise)
- Dredging Corporation of India (State-owned enterprise)

=== Indonesia ===
- Bumi Laut Group

=== Iran ===
- Islamic Republic of Iran Shipping Lines "IRISL" (IRISL Group)

=== Israel ===
- Zim Integrated Shipping Services (Ofer Brothers Group)

=== Japan ===
- Kawasaki Kisen Kaisha "K Line" - BC, CC, RR, TK
- Mitsui O.S.K. Lines "MOL" (Mitsui Group) - BC, CC, RR, TK
- Nippon Yusen Kaisha "NYK Line" (Mitsubishi Group) - BC, CC, RR, TK
- Nissan Motor Car Carrier
- Ocean Network Express "ONE" (K Line, MOL, and NYK Line) - CS
- Toyofuji Shipping

=== Singapore ===
- BW Offshore
- Hong Lam Marine
- Masterbulk
- Tanker Pacific
- Neptune Orient Lines "NOL" (Temasek Holdings)
- Pacific International Lines "PIL"
- X-Press Feeders

=== South Korea ===
- EUKOR
- Hanjin Shipping (Hanjin Group) - BC, CS, RR, TK, CC
- Hyundai Glovis
- Hyundai Merchant Marine "HMM" (Hyundai Group) -CC, BC, CS, RR, TK
- STX Pan Ocean

=== Malaysia ===
- MISC Berhad (PETRONAS)
- Malaysian Bulk Carriers

=== Pakistan ===
- Pakistan National Shipping Corporation "PNSC" (State-owned enterprise)

=== Philippines ===
- 2GO Group "2GO" - CC, RR
- Philippine Span Asia Carrier Corporation > Sulpicio Lines - CS
- Carlos A. Gothong Lines "Gothong Shipping" - CC, RR
- Gothong Southern - CS
- Asian Marine Transport Corporation "Super Shuttle RORO" - CC, RR

=== Saudi Arabia ===
- Bahri (company) "formerly NSCSA"

=== Taiwan ===
- Evergreen Marine (Evergreen Group)
- Wan Hai Lines
- Yang Ming Marine Transport Corporation (China Merchants Group)

=== Turkey ===
- Arkas Container Transport
- BMZ Group
- Cornships Management and Agency

== Europe ==
=== Austria ===
- Austrian Lloyd Ship Management

Defunct

- Österreichischer Lloyd
- Austro-Americana

=== Belgium ===
- Compagnie Maritime Belge "CMB"
- Delphis
- Euro Marine Logistics
- Regie voor Maritiem Transport (State-owned enterprise)

=== Bulgaria ===
- Navibulgar

=== Croatia ===
- Alpha Adriatic
- Atlantska Plovidba
- Tankerska plovidba

=== Denmark ===
- Dampskibsselskabet Norden "D/S Norden"
- Dampskibsselskabet Torm "Torm"
- DFDS Tor Line (DFDS A/S)
- East Asiatic Company
- J. Lauritzen A/S
- Maersk
- Martin Bencher

=== Estonia ===
- Estonian Shipping Company (ESCO)
- Hansa Shipping

=== Finland ===
- Finnlines (Grimaldi Group, Italy)
- SeaRail (Tallink, Estonia / VR Group, Finland / Green Cargo

=== France ===
- Compagnie Générale Maritime (CMA CGM)
- Delmas (CMA CGM)
- Louis Dreyfus Armateurs
- TOWT

Defunct

- Compagnie Générale Transatlantique
- Messageries Maritimes

=== Germany ===
- F. Laeisz
- Hamburg Süd (From 1 December 2017 under ownership of Maersk)
- Hapag-Lloyd
- H. Vogemann
- Deutsche Afrika-Linien
- K Line European Sea Highway Services "KESS"
- Oldendorff Carriers

Defunct

- Norddeutscher Lloyd "NDL"

=== Greece ===
- Arcadia Shipmanagement
- Atlas Maritime
- Avin International
- Ceres Hellenic Shipping Enterprises
- Costamare
- Delta Tankers
- DryShips
- Euroseas (company)
- Lykiardopoulo (Neda Maritime)
- Navios Maritime Holdings
- Top Ships
- Aegean Shipping
- Angelicoussis Group
- Blue Star Cargo
- Creta Cargo Lines
- Maran Dry
- Maran Gas
- Maran Ship Supplies
- Maran Tankers
- Neptune Lines
- Hellenic Sea Lines

Defunct

- Epirotiki Lines
- Excel Maritime
- Karageorgis (shipping company)
- Aegean Cargo Management S.A.
- ANEK Cargo
- Hellenic Line
- Hellenic Seaways Cargo
- NEL Cargo
- Salamis Lines

=== Iceland ===
- Eimskip

=== Italy ===
- Grimaldi Group
- Italia Marittima >Lloyd Triestino (Evergreen Group, Taiwan)
- Messina Line

=== Latvia ===
- Latvian Shipping Company (Latvijas kuģniecība)

=== Monaco ===
- Costamare

=== Netherlands ===
- Seatrade
- Dockwise (Boskalis, 2013)

=== Norway ===
- Aker American Shipping (Aker Group)
- Awilco LNG
- Belships
- Bergesen Worldwide (BW Group)
- Borgestad
- Camillo Eitzen & Co ASA (Eitzen Group)
- Christensen Canadian African Lines
- Color Group AS
- Det Stavangerske Dampskibsselskab "DSD"
- Norwegian Car Carriers AS "NOCC"
- Eitzen Chemical (Eitzen Group)
- Eitzen Maritime Services ASA (Eitzen Group)
- Farstad Shipping
- First Olsen Tankers
- Fred. Olsen & Co.
- GC Rieber Shipping
- Golar LNG
- Green Reefers
- Grieg Shipping
- Havila Shipping
- I. M. Skaugen
- J. J. Ugland
- J. Ludwig Mowinckels Rederi
- Knutsen O.A.S. Shipping AS
- Leif Höegh & Co
- Nor Lines
- Odfjell
- Siem Shipping
- Solvang
- Solstad Offshore
- Grieg Star Shipping
- Stolt-Nielsen
- United European Car Carriers
- Waterfront Shipping
- Westfal-Larsen
- Wallenius Wilhelmsen Logistics "WW" (Wallenius Lines AB, Sweden, and Wilh. Wilhelmsen Holding ASA, Norway)
- Wilh. Wilhelmsen Holding ASA "Wilhelmsen"
- Western Bulk
- Wilson ASA

Defunct

- A. F. Klaveness & Co
- Gerrards Rederi
- Norwegian America Line

=== Poland ===
- Polsteam > Polish Steamship Company >>Polska Żegluga Morska "PŻM"

=== Portugal ===
- Portline

=== Romania ===
- Histria Shipmanagement

=== Russia ===
- Far East Shipping Company "FESCO"
- Sakhalin Shipping Company " SASCO"
- Sovcomflot "SCF" >Sovtorgflot
- Volgotanker

Defunct

- Baltic Sea Steamship Company

=== Spain ===
Defunct

- Compañía Transatlántica Española "Spanish Line"

=== Sweden ===
- Brostrom (from 2008 a part of Maersk)
- Johnson Line (Nordstjernan)
- Stena Sphere
- Wallenius Lines, (Soya Group)

Defunct

- DFDS Tor Line
- Rederi AB Slite
- Rederi AB Svea

=== Switzerland ===
- Mediterranean Shipping Company

=== Ukraine ===
- UkrFerry

=== United Kingdom ===
- Bibby Line

Defunct

- African & Eastern Trade Corporation
- African Steamship Company
- Anchor Line
- Alfred Holt and Company "Blue Funnel Line"
- Blue Star Line
- Bristol City Line
- British India Steam Navigation Company "British India Line"
- Clan Line
- Douglas Steamship Company (Hong Kong)
- Elder Dempster Line
- Ellerman Line
- Evan Thomas Radcliffe
- Fyffes Line
- Harrison Line
- Hong Kong, Canton & Macao Steamboat Company (Hong Kong)
- Loch Line
- London & Overseas Freighters
- Manchester Liners
- New Zealand Shipping Company
- Olau Line
- Orient Steam Navigation Company "Orient Line"
- OT Africa Line (CMA CGM, France)
- Overseas Containers Limited
- Pacific Steam Navigation Company
- Palm Line
- P&O (DP World, UAE)
- P&O Nedlloyd (Merged into Maersk)
- Port Line
- Red Star Line
- Royal Mail Lines
- Sea Containers (Headquarter in UK, and Bermuda)
- Shaw, Savill & Albion Line
- Silver Line
- Union-Castle Line
- United Africa Company

== North America ==
=== Bermuda ===
- Frontline Ltd. (Hemen Holding, Norway) - TK
- Golden Ocean Group (Hemen Holding, Norway)

=== Canada ===
- Algoma Central (Great Lakes and trans ocean)
- Canada Steamship Lines (Great Lakes)
- CP Ships (Great Lakes and trans ocean, deduncted)
- Fednav (Great Lakes and trans ocean)
- Groupe Desgagnés (Great Lakes and trans ocean)
- Lower Lakes Towing (Great Lakes)
- Upper Lakes Shipping Company (Great Lakes)

=== United States ===
- American President Lines
- American Roll-on Roll-off Carrier
- American Steamship Company (Great Lakes)
- Crowley Maritime
- Great Lakes Fleet (Great Lakes)
- Interlake Steamship Company (Great Lakes)
- Matson Navigation Company
- Overseas Shipholding Group (Saltchuk)
- Pasha Hawaii
- SeaLand
- Waterman Steamship Corporation

== Oceania ==
=== Australia ===
- Australian National Line (CMA CGM, France)
- Toll Domestic Forwarding (Toll Group)

=== Fiji ===
- Patterson Brothers Shipping Company

=== Nauru ===
- Nauru Pacific Line

=== New Zealand ===
- New Zealand Shipping Company (P&O, UK)

Defunct

- Union Steam Ship Company of New Zealand

=== Samoa ===
- Pacific Forum Line

== South America ==
=== Argentina ===
- Empresa Líneas Marítimas Argentinas "ELMA"

=== Brazil ===
- Wilson, Sons

=== Chile ===
- Compañía Sudamericana de Vapores "CSAV"

== See also ==
- List of largest container shipping companies
