= Eitzen =

Eitzen may refer to:

Places

- Eitzen, Minnesota

Companies

- Eitzen Group

- Eitzen Chemical
- Eitzen Gas
- Eitzen Maritime Services

People

- Axel Camillo Eitzen (1851–1937), Norwegian founder of the Eitzen Group
- Axel Camillo Eitzen (1883–1968), Norwegian inheritor of the Eitzen Group
- Johan Eitzen (1893–), Norwegian businessman in Uruguay
