= Evergas =

Danish company

Evergas is a Danish shipping company headquartered in Copenhagen, Denmark, active in the seaborne trade of liquefied natural gas (LNG), Ethane and liquefied petroleum gases (LPG). It is a subsidiary of Seapeak.

== Fleet ==
The company’s six pressurized LPG carriers are capable of carrying petrochemical gases in 5.000 cbm tanks. Because the vessels are relatively small, they are mostly deployed on short haul trades.

Eight semi-refrigerated multi-gas carriers comprise the company’s mid-sized fleet. The 27.500 cbm vessels can carry methane, LNG, ethylene and ethane, propane, and butane. The vessels have a total length overall (LOA) of 180 meters, and can sail burning gas or maritime fuel oil.[iv]

Two very large ethane carriers (VLECs) comprise the company’s largest vessel class. These VLECs are compatible with ethylene and ethane as well as propane and butane cargoes. With 85.000 cbm capacity, the vessels are the largest purpose-built ethane carriers currently under operations. Evergas took delivery of the first VLEC in 2019 and has since then deployed the vessels on the US -China trade.

== Structure ==
Evergas has offices in Denmark, Singapore, France and China. In total, the company employs 550 people. The company is managed by the chief operating officer, Steffen Jacobsen, who assumed his current position in 2015.

== History ==
In 1883, Camillo Eitzen established the Eitzen Group, which operated steamships in its early days. With the acquisition of KIL shipping in 2001, Eitzen became a gas shipping company and entered the gas market with its subsidiary, Eitzen Gas. In 2004, Eitzen Gas expands its gas fleet by buying the company Gibson gas. In the same year Eitzen Gas entered the Ethylene segment through the acquisition of Bergensen’s Igloo gas fleet. In 2006, Eitzen formed a joint venture with Norgas called the Eitzen Norgas Carrier Pool. Three years later, Eitzen established a joint venture with Solvang Ethylene. By then, Eitzen had become a gas ship owner. Since 2011, the company, formerly known as Eitzen Gas, has been re-named to Evergas and operates as a standalone entity. In 2023 Evergas was purchased by Seapeak.
