= Axel Camillo Eitzen =

Axel Camillo Eitzen may refer to:

- Axel Camillo Eitzen (1851–1937), Norwegian ship-owner
- Axel Camillo Eitzen (1883–1968), Norwegian ship-owner
