= List of largest container shipping companies =

Several shipping lines are involved in intermodal freight transport as part of international trade.

== List of largest container shipping companies ==
This is a list of the 30 largest container shipping companies as of April 2026, according to Alphaliner, ranked in order of the twenty-foot equivalent unit (TEU) capacity of their fleet. In January 2022, MSC overtook Maersk for the container line with the largest shipping capacity for the first time since 1996. Hanjin Shipping was also one of the biggest but it is now defunct.

Rank	Company name	Headquarters	Total TEU	Ships	Market share	Notes	Alliance
1	Mediterranean Shipping Company (MSC)	Switzerland	7,318,632	1000	21.6%	(Note: Includes WEC Lines)	
2	Maersk	Denmark	4,647,588	735	13.7%	(Note: Includes P&O Nedlloyd, Safmarine, SeaLand and Hamburg Süd)	Gemini
3	CMA CGM	France	4,273,202	723	12.6%	(Note: Includes American President Lines (APL), Neptune Orient Lines (NOL), Australian National Line (ANL), Compagnie Marocaine de Navigation (Comanav), CNC Line, Delmas, Mercosul Line, and Containerships)	Ocean Alliance
4	COSCO Shipping Lines (COSCO)	China	3,593,746	554	10.6%	(Note: Includes COSCO Shipping Lines (COSCO), China Shipping Container Lines (China Shipping Group), Orient Overseas Container Line (Orient Overseas (International) Limited), Shanghai Pan Asia Shipping, New Golden Sea Shipping, and Coheung)	Ocean Alliance
5	Hapag-Lloyd	Germany	2,400,946	291	7.1%	(Note: Includes CP Ships, Compañía Sudamericana de Vapores (CSAV), United Arab Shipping Company (UASC), Nile Dutch Investments B.V. (NileDutch), and Deutsche Afrika-Linien/John T. Essberger (DAL/JTE))	Gemini
6	Ocean Network Express (ONE)	Japan	2,134,872	272	6.3%	(Note: Includes Nippon Yusen Kaisha (NYK Line), Mitsui O.S.K. Lines (MOL) and Kawasaki Kisen Kaisha (K Line))	Premier Alliance
7	Evergreen Marine Corporation	Taiwan	1,973,231	239	5.8%	(Note: Includes Italia Marittima and Uniglory Marine)	Ocean Alliance
8	HMM Co. Ltd.	South Korea	1,029,773	97	3.0%		Premier Alliance
9	Yang Ming Marine Transport Corporation	Taiwan	741,908	98	2.2%		Premier Alliance
10	Zim Integrated Shipping Services	Israel	698,205	115	2.1%		
11	Wan Hai Lines	Taiwan	591,132	120	1.7%		
12	Pacific International Lines (PIL)	Singapore	442,216	99	1.3%	(Note: Includes Advance Container Line (ACL), Pacific Direct Line (PDL), and Mariana Express Lines Ltd. (MELL))	
13	X-Press Feeders	Singapore	192,780	103	0.6%	(Note: Includes Consortium and X-Press Container Line)	
14	Shandong International Transportation Corporation (SITC)	China	187,472	121	0.6%		
15	Unifeeder	Denmark	165,289	94	0.5%		
16	Korea Marine Transport Corporation (KMTC)	South Korea	155,914	65	0.5%		
17	IRISL Group	Iran	142,180	29	0.4%	(Note: Includes Islamic Republic of Iran Shipping Lines, HDS Lines, Valfajre Eight Shipping Company, and Khazar Shipping Company)	
18	Global Feeder Shipping LLC	United Arab Emirates	131,734	53	0.4%		
19	Sinokor Merchant Marine	South Korea	120,081	68	0.4%		
20	TS Lines	Taiwan	106,751	40	0.3%		
21	Regional Container Lines (RCL)	Thailand	101,908	33	0.3%		
22	Emirates Shipping Line	United Arab Emirates	98,114	22	0.3%		
23	Ningbo Ocean Shipping Co.	China	89,801	90	0.3%		
24	Tangshan Port Hede Shipping	China	85,867	57	0.3%		
25	Interasia Lines	Japan	77,985	27	0.2%		
26	Grimaldi Group	Italy	77,276	50	0.2%		
27	Antong Holdings (QASC)	China	73,446	72	0.2%		
28	Sinotrans	China	71,142	44	0.2%		
29	SM Line	South Korea	69,951	15	0.2%		
30	Matson	United States	69,227	28	0.2%		

== See also ==
- List of largest container ships
- List of busiest container ports
- List of freight ship companies
