= Annette Malm Justad =

Norwegian businessperson (born 1958)

Annette Malm Justad (born 1958) is a Norwegian businessperson.

As education she has two master's degrees, one in technology management from the MIT Sloan School of Management and the Norwegian Institute of Technology, and another in chemical engineering from the Norwegian Institute of Technology. She was employed at Norsk Hydro, as vice president and Fleet Manager at Norgas Carriers and Vice President of Yara International before she became CEO of Eitzen Maritime Services.

Malm Justad is a member of the board of directors at Petroleum Geo-Services, and is a member of the board of Camillo Eitzen & Co and Aker American Shipping. She is a non-executive director of the Port of London Authority.
