= Pacific Shipping, Inc. =

- Formerly: DAR Shipping Agency (2009-2012)
- Type: Private
- Industry: Cargo/Freight, Container lease/sale, Transport & Logistics
- Founded: 2009, 2012 (Inc.)
- Founder: Charles T. Domnick
- Headquarters: Delap, Majuro, Marshall Islands
- Number of locations: Majuro & Ebeye, Marshall Islands
- Area served: Worldwide
- Key people: Salome Andrike (CEO); Charles T. Domnick (Chairman Emeritus); Francis Carlos Domnick (President); Mio Domnick-Takju (CFO); Jeffrey Riofrer (COO)
- Parent: ANIL-DAR-PSI Group of Companies
- Subsidiaries: Anil Development Inc., DAR Sales and Services (Including Salon De Majuro, Sisters Sewing Shop and DAR Retail Store/C & C's Store ), Jittak Bar & Take Out, DAR Coffee Corner Restaurant(Majuro), DAR-EBEYE Restaurant(Ebeye) and formerly DAR (Domnick Auto Rentals) Majuro.
- Website: www.mellship.com/Agency/MH www.npdlship.com/contact-us/

Pacific Shipping, Inc. (PSI) is a shipping company founded in 2009 and incorporated in Majuro, Marshall Islands in 2012. PSI is the Shipping agent for Pacific International Lines, Mariana Express Lines PTE LTD, Neptune Pacific Direct Line & Inchcape Shipping Services (Formerly). PSI is the only agency that handle all oil tankers transport on Majuro (2012 - 2020). The founder of PSI is Charles T. Domnick a Marshallese entrepreneur, honorary consulate of Israel in Majuro, former Minister of finance in 1982, Minister of Foreign affairs in 1987 during the term of late president Amata Kabua, UN representative of Marshall Islands and former Senator of the country also a congressman for Marshalls during the time of Trust Territory of the Pacific Islands in four consecutive terms, together with Hackney Takju a former mayor of Ailuk Atoll as General manager & Francis Carlos Domnick as CEO (Including Anil Development Inc.). PSI is the sister companies of Anil Development Inc. and DAR Sales & Services.

== Description ==
The company is started in 2009 as DAR Shipping Agency, Since 2012 as the company expanded and launched its Containerization program it became the Shipping agent for Mariana Express Lines LTD. (MELL) based in Singapore, Pacific International Lines (partially the ownership of Singapore's Mariana Express Lines and Pacific Direct Line based in New Zealand, Also providing services for Inchcape Shipping Services (ISS) oil tankers in Majuro. In 2018 CTSI ( Consolidated Transportation Services Incorporated ) Air & Sea Services Logistics based on Guam make a deal on PSI to be their agent in Majuro. PSI also accommodate Cruise ships having leisure in Marshall Islands and private or public (government) projects/services.

PSI offer liner shipping services to route of Hong Kong, Guam, Saipan, Taiwan and United States ports for PIL. Using Hong Kong and Kaoshiung as hubs, MELL currently carries containers between China, Southeast Asia, Japan, Australia and islands in the Pacific with 22 ports including Fiji (Suva and Lautoka), Samoa, American Samoa, Tonga (Nuku’alofa), Tahiti, the Cook Islands (Rarotonga), Norfolk & Tarawa for PDL.

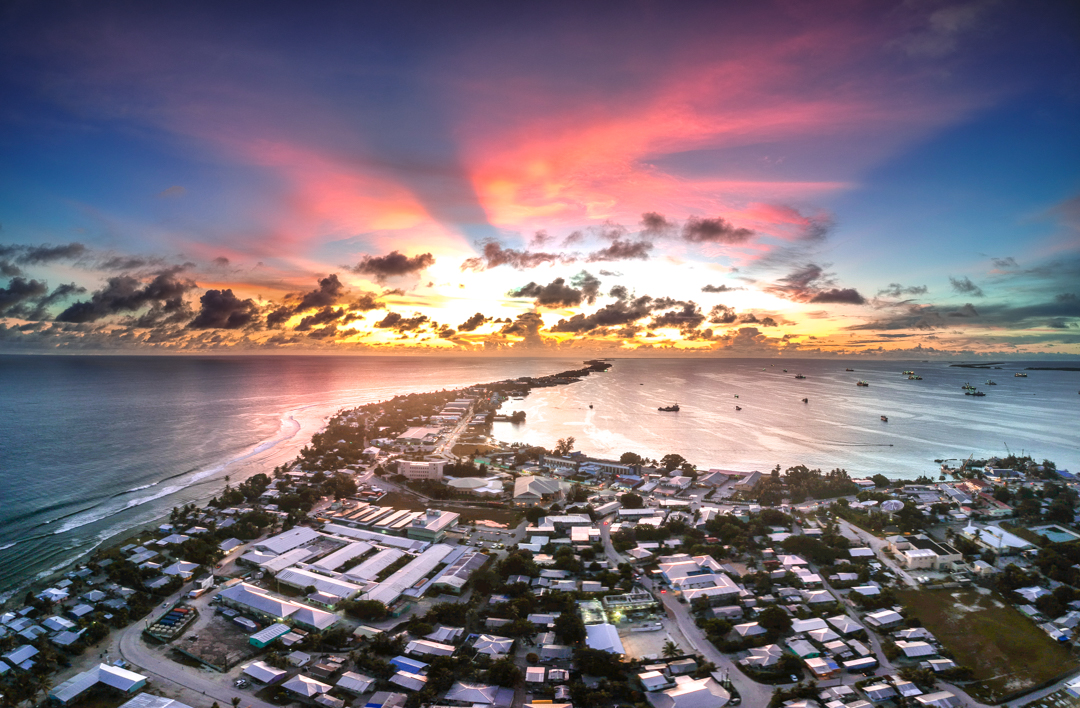
View from Delap-Uliga-Darrit where PSI located

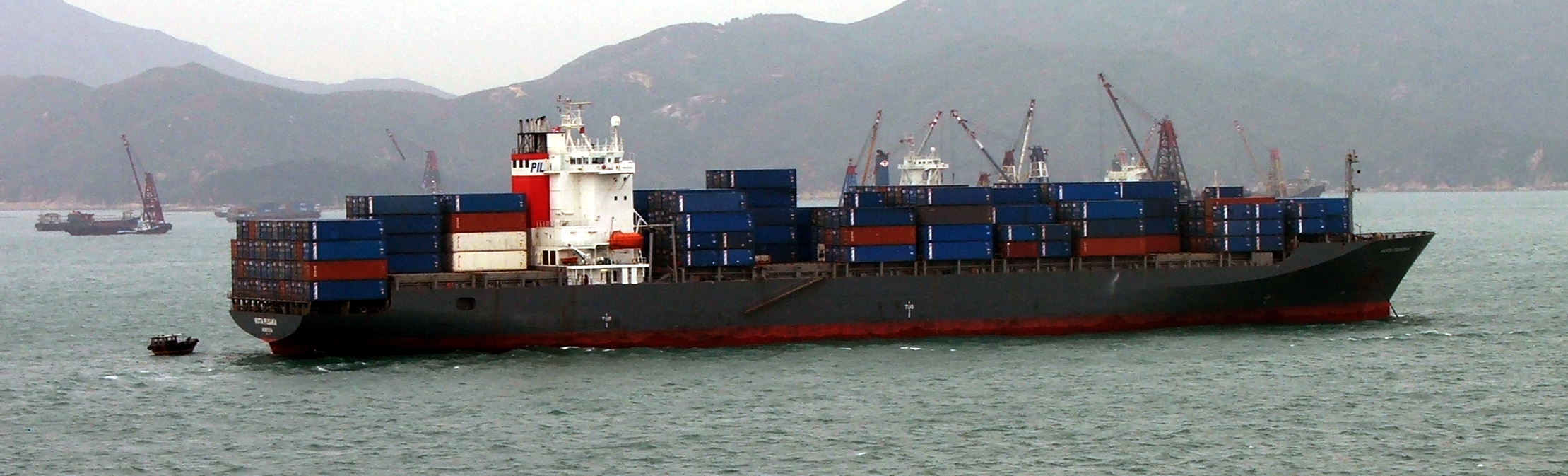
PIL vessel in Hong Kong

In August 2016 when Indian Navy visited Majuro for commitment to peace and prosperity of the Indo-Pacific region and Indian Navy's increasing footprint and operational reach, Pacific Shipping, Inc. serve for providing the navy transportation services in Majuro.

In March 2019 while Pacific Partnership wraps up in Marshall Islands, Pacific Shipping, Inc. working with Seaway Filipinas Logistics based on Olongapo, Zambales Philippines to provide all transportation services to US Navy (USNS Brunswick) that joins the program.

== Executive Management/Departments ==
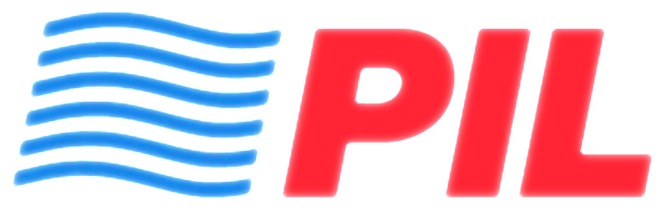
PIL LOGO

- Salome Andrike (CEO)
- Francis Carlos Domnick (President)
- Mio Domnick-Takju (CFO)
- Jeffrey Riofrer (COO)
- Aloysius Domnick (Deputy Operations Officer)

== Vessels ==
=== MELL Cargo vessels to Majuro & Ebeye ===
- MV KOTA HENNING
- MV KOTA HAPAS
- MV KOTA HAKIM
- MV KOTA HARUM
- MV KOTA HALUS

=== PDL Cargo vessels to Majuro ===
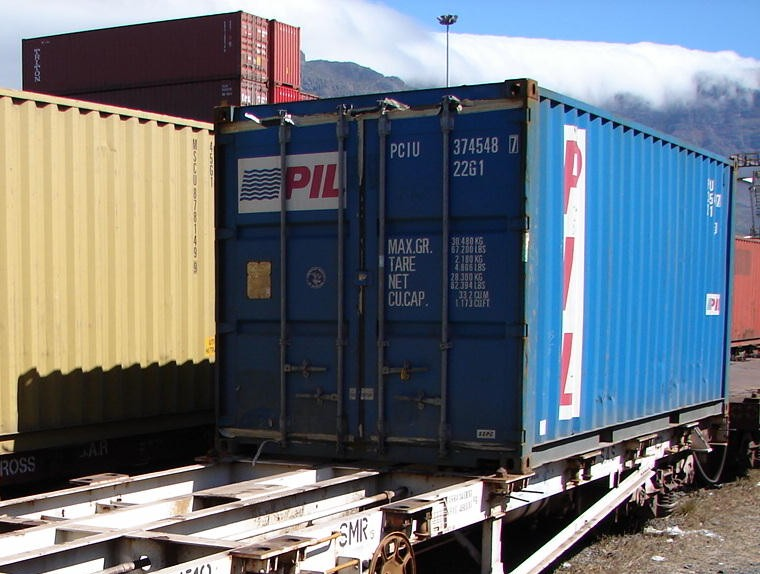
PIL 20 footer dry container

- MV SOUTHERN PEARL
- MV CAPITAINE QUIROS

=== DAR Cargo/Fishing vessels in Majuro to Ebeye ===
- LC CHASE D
- MV JEJNICA
- MV Charlies Angels (decommissioned)
- MV Tojolok (decommissioned)
- MV Miss Tamioko (decommissioned)

=== Oil Tanker vessels to Majuro ===
- MT AKRI
- MT SOPHIA
- STI MANHATTAN
- STI ASTRALL EXPRESS
- STI CSC PEACE
- STI AQUA
- STI FOREVER GLORY
- MV FAIRLIFT
- STI FOREVER PROSPERITY
- STI GRAND ACE
- STI MAYFAIR
- MT AXIOS
- MT HIGH VENTURE
- MT LEOPARD STAR
- MT CHANG HANG XI WANG
- MT HERACLES

== See also ==
- Pacific International Lines
- Marshall Islands
- Containerization
- Flag of convenience
- Tanker (ship)
