= MV Cristina A =

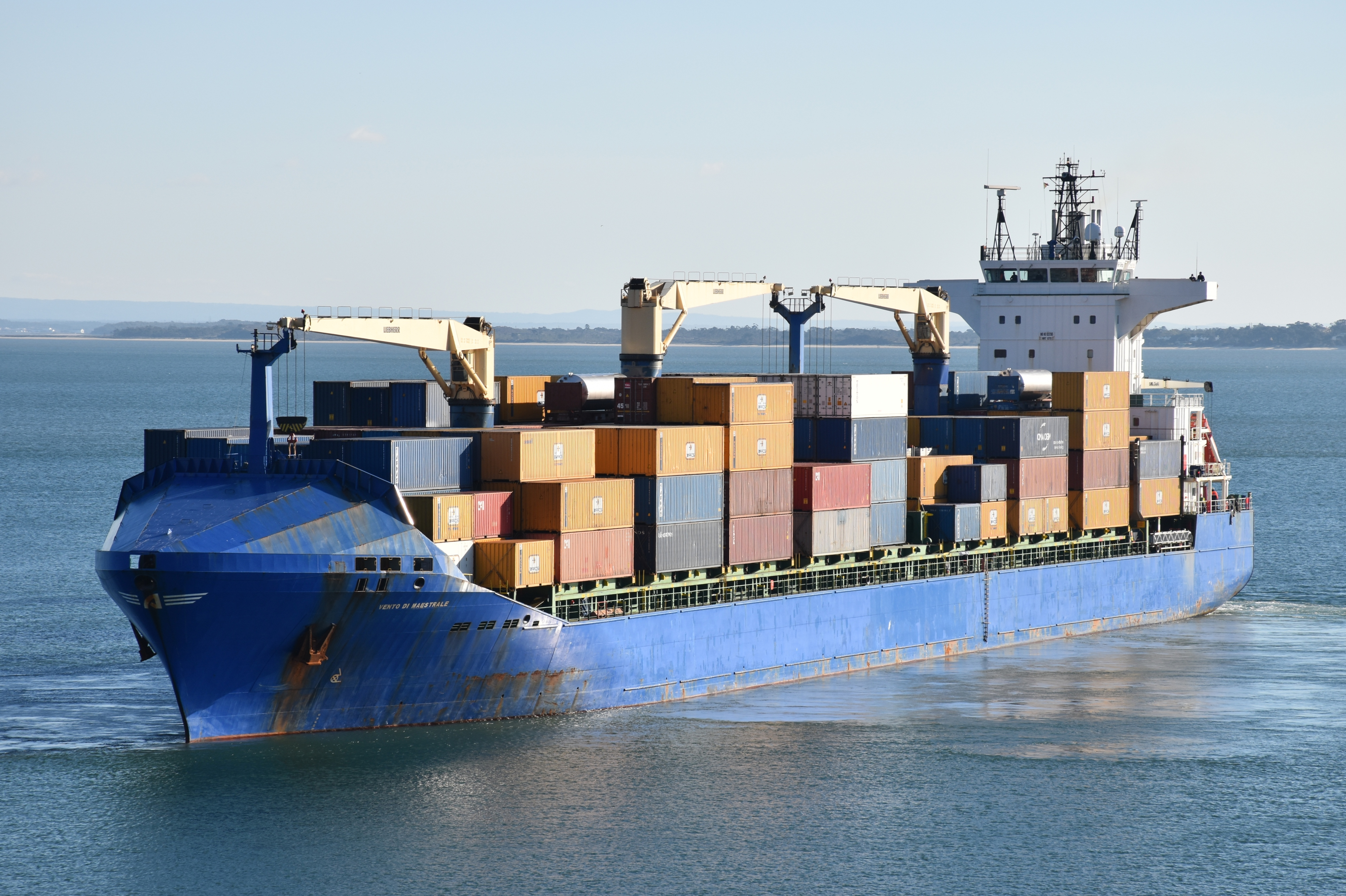
- As Vento di Maestrale in 2019

History
- Name: Cristina A.
- Owner: Limar Liman ve Gemi İşletmeleri A.Ş., Istanbul, Turkey
- Operator: Delmas, Le Havre, France
- Port of registry: İzmir, Turkey
- Route: CMA CGM WAF Service
- Ordered: November 1, 2004
- Builder: Peene Werft GmbH, Wolgast, Germany
- Yard number: 535
- Laid down: October 27, 2006
- Launched: February 16, 2007
- Completed: May 3, 2007
- In service: June 8, 2008
- Identification: IMO number: 9337365
- Status: In service

General characteristics
- Class & type: Feeder container ship
- Tonnage: 17,687 GT
- Displacement: 22,014 long tons (22,367 t)
- Length: 177.75 m (583 ft 2 in) (LBP); 183.89 m (603 ft 4 in) (LOA)
- Beam: 24.50 m (80 ft 5 in)
- Draught: 9 m (29 ft 6 in)
- Depth: 14.20 m (46 ft 7 in) (moulded)<
- Installed power: 13,280 kW
- Propulsion: MAN B&W Diesel 8s50 MC-C, two stroke single acting
- Speed: 20.6 knots (38.2 km/h; 23.7 mph) (max); 19.0 knots (35.2 km/h; 21.9 mph) (avg)
- Capacity: 1,604 TEU
- Crew: 16
- Notes: PW 1600-class Container Ship.

The MV Cristina A is a Turkish flagged container ship owned by the Turkey based Limar Liman ve Gemi Isletmeleri A.S. and operated by the Delmas Shipping Co. in Le Havre, France. The vessel has a capacity of 1,604 nominal teus or 1,174 teus 14TH. She has been in service since June 8, 2008 on the route between Europe and West Africa. She is the 18th vessel in the fleet of Arkas Shipping & Transport Co. with the company having 23 container ships in total as of October 2008. The shipping line is ultimately operated by CMA CGM through its subsidiary OTAL.

In 2019 on charterers request the ship was renamed Vento di Maestrale, and brought under Malta flag, homeport Valletta. In May 2023 she was renamed again Cristina A, still sailing in management of Arkas Shipping.
