= Justad =

Justad is a Norwegian surname. Notable people with the surname include:

- Annette Malm Justad (born 1958), Norwegian businesswoman
- Sondre Justad (born 1990), Norwegian musician and songwriter
