= Camillo Eitzen & Co =

Norway-based shipping company

Camillo Eitzen & Co ASA
- Company type: Public
- Industry: Shipping
- Founded: 1883
- Headquarters: Oslo, Norway
- Area served: Global
- Products: Dry bulk Gas tanker Tanker
- Parent: Eitzen Group (53%)
- Website: www.camillo-eitzen.com

Camillo Eitzen & Co (OSE: CECO) is an international shipping company that operates a total of 51 dry bulk, gas tanker and tanker vessels. Including commercial managed and newbuilding ships the group has 136 vessels. The company is controlled by the Eitzen Group (53%), of which it used to be a part of up until 2004. It is based in Oslo, Norway, and is listed on the Oslo Stock Exchange. Camillo Etizen & Co are also majority owners of Eitzen Chemical and Eitzen Maritime Services.

== Operations ==
=== Bulk ===
June 2010, CECO has sold its entire stake (74.33%) in Eitzen Bulk Shipping A/S (“Eitzen Bulk Shipping”) to Navieras Ultragas Ltda. at an agreed purchase price of $93MM. CECO do not own any shares in Eitzen Bulk Shipping.

=== Gas ===
There are two gas subsidiaries, Eitzen Gas that operates 22 vessels with additional six on order and ENGC that operates 18 vessels with additional three on order. In total 49 vessels operated or on order.

=== Tanker ===
The group has six tankers owned through the three subsidiaries (organized as kommandittselskap) Partankers I KS, Partankers II KS and Partankers III AS with two, three and one ships, respectively. The company previously owned the company Tschudi & Eitzen Shipping.
