= Chang Yun Chung =

Singaporean millionaire and shipping magnate (1918–2020)

- 张允中
- Born: 27 August 1918; Kinmen, China
- Died: 4 September 2020 (aged 102); Singapore
- Other name: Teo Woon Tiong
- Education: Xiamen Datung College
- Children: 14

Chang Yun Chung
- Simplified Chinese: 张允中
- Traditional Chinese: 張允中
Transcriptions
Standard Mandarin
- Hanyu Pinyin: Zhāng Yǔnzhōng
- Wade–Giles: Chang Yünchung
Yue: Cantonese
- Jyutping: Zoeng^{1} Wan^{5}-zung^{1}
Southern Min
- Hokkien POJ: Tiuⁿ Ún-tiong

Chang Yun Chung (Chinese: 张允中; 27 August 1918 – 4 September 2020), also known as Teo Woon Tiong, was a Singaporean billionaire and shipping magnate who founded Pacific International Lines (PIL). He was the world's oldest billionaire after the death of David Rockefeller in 2017.

== Early life ==
Chang was born on Kinmen Island on 27 August 1918. He had two brothers and three sisters.

=== Education ===
Chang attended primary school in Kinmen and high school in Xiamen, before studying at the Xiamen Datung College in China.

=== World War II ===
When the Japanese invaded China in 1937, Chang fled to Singapore along with his mother and siblings to join his father who had moved there in 1935. In 1940, Chang moved to Malacca to do business with his uncle, who transported goods from Sumatra to Malacca. During the Japanese occupation of Malaya, Chang hid in rubber plantations outside of Malacca. When he returned to Singapore, which was also occupied by Japan, in search of his father, he found out that his father had been killed by the Japanese after being caught by the Kempeitai. He then returned to Malacca with his mother and continued to do business with his uncle. He was caught by the Japanese in 1942 and 1944 as he had aided the anti-Japanese resistance in Malaya. In 1944, he was supposed to be executed by the Japanese, but was instead held captive until the surrender of Japan in 1945 as his mother had given all her possessions to the head of the Kempeitai to ensure his safety. Following the Japanese surrender in 1945, Chang returned to Singapore.

== Career ==
In 1948, Chang joined Thye Hin Guan Brothers, a produce company in Singapore, where he worked as the general manager. He entered the shipping business in 1949 after helping Thye Hin Guan Brothers form Kie Hock, a now defunct shipping company. During this time, he also served as a director at other shipping companies.

=== PIL ===
In 1967, Chang left Kie Hock and founded PIL in Singapore. Originally formed as a coastal operator, PIL operated a route from Jakarta to Bangkok with two used ships that Chang had bought. He led PIL to become one of the first foreign shipping companies to venture into China. PIL has since expanded to become one of the largest shipping companies in Singapore. His son, Teo Siong Seng, succeeded him as the executive chairman of PIL in April 2018. He remained in the company with the honorary title of chairman emeritus and continued serving an active advisory role.

== Wealth ==
According to Forbes, Chang became a billionaire in 2014, with his net worth reaching as high as $2.7 billion in 2015. In March 2017, at age 98, Chang became the world's oldest living billionaire after the death of David Rockefeller. His net worth fell below $1 billion in 2020, with Forbes estimating his net worth as $875 million in August 2020 prior to his death.

== Personal life ==
Chang had eight sons and six daughters. Chang died in his sleep in his Singapore home on 4 September 2020 after turning 102 the prior month.
