= Dubrovnik Airline =

Croatian charter airline

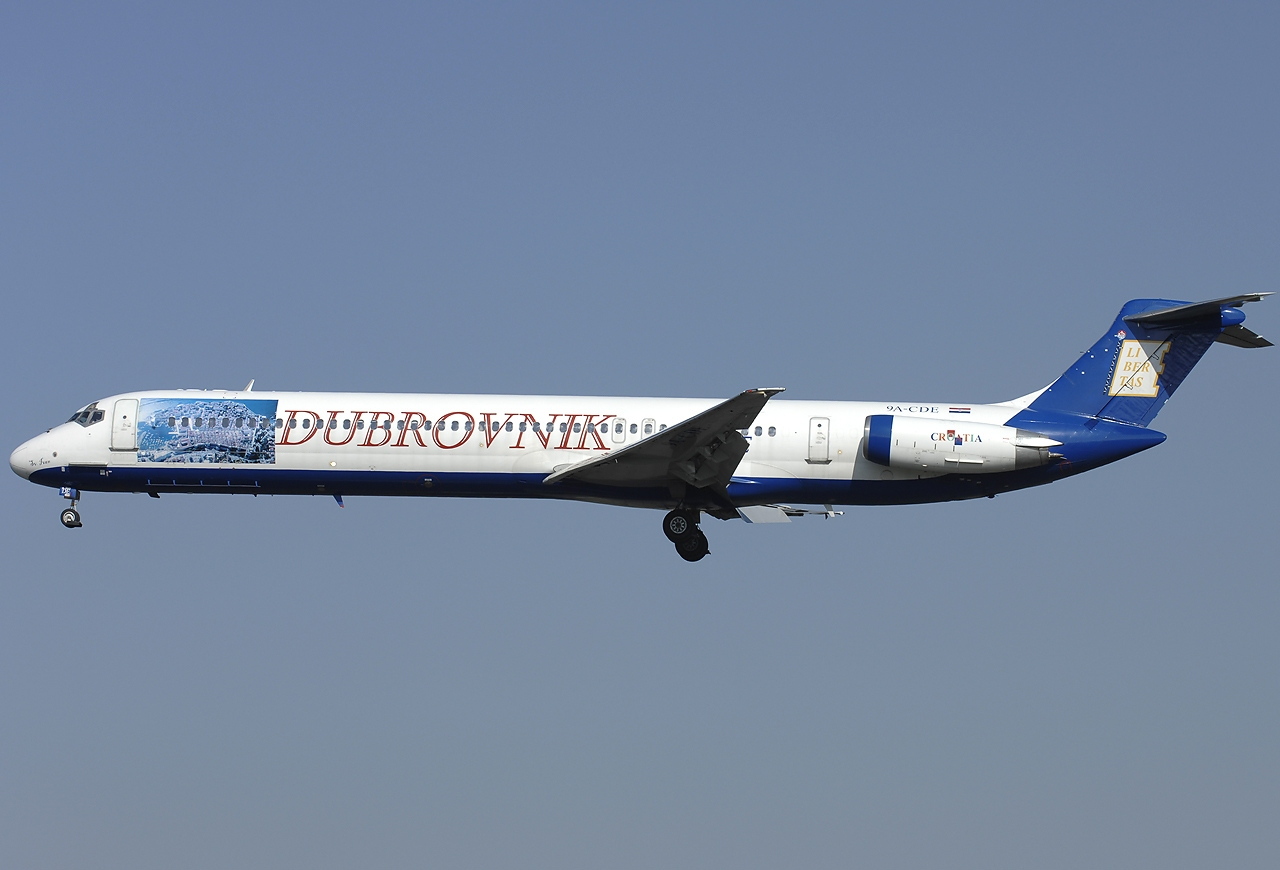
- McDonnell Douglas MD-82
IATA	ICAO	Call sign
2D	DBK	DUBROVNIK AIR
- Founded: 15 December 2004
- Ceased operations: 23 October 2011
- Operating bases: Dubrovnik Airport
- Focus cities: Split Airport; Zagreb Airport
- Fleet size: 6
- Destinations: 44
- Parent company: Atlantska Plovidba
- Headquarters: Dubrovnik, Croatia
- Key people: Zeno Singer (MD)
- Website: www.dubrovnikairline.com

Dubrovnik Airline Limited was a Croatian charter airline, based in Dubrovnik, Croatia. It operated tourist charter flights from Europe and Israel to holiday destinations in Croatia. Its main base was Dubrovnik Airport.

== History ==
The airline was officially launched on 15 December 2004 by Croatian shipping company Atlantska Plovidba. It started operations in April 2005. In 2006, Dubrovnik Airline carried 380,000 passengers while the first seven months of 2007, saw it transport 360,000 passengers. The airline was loss making since 2009 and ceased all operations on 23 October 2011 after defaulting on its debts thus declaring bankruptcy.

== Destinations ==
Dubrovnik Airline served the following destinations (at October 2011):

Africa

- Tunisia
  - Tunis - Tunis-Carthage International Airport

Asia

- Israel
  - Tel Aviv - Ben Gurion International Airport [seasonal]

Europe

- Austria
  - Salzburg - Salzburg Airport
  - Vienna - Vienna International Airport
- Croatia
  - Dubrovnik - Dubrovnik Airport Base
  - Pula - Pula Airport
  - Split - Split Kaštela/Resnik Airport focus city
  - Zagreb - Zagreb Airport focus city
- Finland
  - Helsinki - Helsinki Airport
- France
  - Lyon - Saint-Exupéry Airport
  - Nantes - Atlantique Airport
  - Paris - Charles de Gaulle Airport
  - Paris - Orly Airport
  - Toulouse - Toulouse Blagnac International Airport
- Germany
  - Cologne - Cologne Bonn Airport
  - Munich - Munich Airport
  - Stuttgart - Stuttgart Airport
- Greece
  - Athens - Athens Airport
- Ireland
  - Cork - Cork Airport
  - Dublin - Dublin Airport
  - Knock - Ireland West Airport
  - Shannon - Shannon Airport
- Italy
  - Milan - Orio al Serio Airport
  - Pescara - Abruzzo International Airport
  - Rome - Leonardo da Vinci-Fiumicino Airport
- Malta
  - Luqa - Malta International Airport
- Netherlands
  - Amsterdam - Amsterdam Schiphol Airport
- Norway
  - Oslo - Oslo Airport
- Serbia
  - Belgrade - Belgrade Nikola Tesla Airport
- Slovenia
  - Ljubljana - Ljubljana Jože Pučnik International Airport
- Spain
  - Barcelona - Barcelona International Airport
  - Bilbao - Bilbao Airport
  - Girona - Girona-Costa Brava Airport
  - Madrid - Madrid Barajas International Airport
  - Palma de Mallorca - Son Sant Joan Airport
  - Seville - San Pablo Airport
- Sweden
  - Malmö - Malmö Airport
  - Stockholm - Stockholm-Arlanda Airport
- Switzerland
  - Geneva - Geneva Cointrin International Airport
  - Zürich - Zürich Airport
- Turkey
  - Antalya - Antalya Airport
- United Kingdom
  - England
    - London - Gatwick Airport
    - Manchester - Manchester Airport
  - Scotland
    - Glasgow - Glasgow Prestwick Airport
  - Northern Ireland
    - Belfast - Belfast International
