= PIL P-class container ship =

Container ship class

Class overview
- Builders: Yangzijiang Shipyard
- Operators: Pacific International Lines; Seaspan; Wan Hai Lines; Mediterranean Shipping Company
- In service: 2017–present
- Planned: 12
- Completed: 12
- Active: 12

General characteristics
- Type: Container ship
- Tonnage: 114,380 GT
- Length: 330 m (1,080 ft)
- Beam: 48.2 m (158 ft)
- Draught: 16 m (52 ft)
- Capacity: 11,923 TEU

The P-class is a series of 12 container ships originally built for Pacific International Lines (PIL). The ships were built by Yangzijiang Shipyard in China and have a maximum theoretical capacity of around 11,923 twenty-foot equivalent units (TEU). In 2020 four of the ships were sold to Seaspan and two other ships were sold to Wan Hai Lines.

== List of ships ==
Ship	Previous names	Yard number	IMO number	Delivery	Status	ref
Kota Pahlawan		YZJ2015-1208	9786712	27 Oct 2017	In service	
Paranagua Express	Kota Panjang (2017-2020)	YZJ2015-1209	9786724	1 Nov 2017	In service	
Seaspan Osprey	Kota Pekarang (2017-2020)	YZJ2015-1210	9786736	23 Nov 2017	In service	
Kota Pelangi		YZJ2015-1211	9786748	9 Jan 2018	In service	
Buenos Aires Express	Kota Pemimpin (2018-2021)	YZJ2015-1212	9793894	27 Mar 2018	In service	
Seaspan Falcon	Kota Perabu (2018-2020)	YZJ2015-1213	9793909	3 Apr 2018	In service	
Seaspan Raptor	Kota Perdana (2018-2020)	YZJ2015-1214	9793911	10 Apr 2018	In service	
Seaspan Harrier	Kota Perkasa (2018-2020)	YZJ2015-1215	9793923	17 Apr 2018	In service	
Montevideo Express	Kota Perwira (2018-2019); Wan Hai 805 (2019-2020)	YZJ2015-1230	9793935	16 Oct 2018	In service	
MSC Siya B	Kota Petani (2018-2021)	YZJ2015-1231	9793947	5 Nov 2018	In service	
Kota Puri		YZJ2015-1232	9793959	9 Jan 2019	In service	
Kota Pusaka		YZJ2015-1233	9793961	12 Mar 2019	In service	
