= Hong Lam Marine =

Hong Lam Marine is a ship owning company, and an operator of petroleum products and chemical tankers, based in Singapore. The company operates a fleet of 35 tankers, totaling a tonnage of 290 605 Deadweight-Tonnage (DWT). Hong Lam Marine has tankers operating within the ports of Singapore, Malaysia, the United Arab Emirates, Australia and in international waters. The tankers are purpose-built and its business activities are mainly in the chartering and ship management of these vessels. The tankers are used for bunkering marine fuels, transportation of jet fuel, supplying marine lubricants in bulk, drums and packs, and transportation of petroleum products and chemicals.

== History ==
Hong Lam Marine was founded in 1981 by Lim Teck Cheng, the current Chief Executive, together with his father. Business began with two wooden barges chartered to Esso Singapore, which transported fuel within the Singapore port. In the same year, Esso Singapore awarded two more contracts to Hong Lam Marine. Hong Lam Marine expanded their fleet with the purchase of two steel bunker tankers from Japan. These were then modified to meet the local regulations for operating in the Port of Singapore. In 1989, the company started building single-hull ships of 4,000 – 6,000 DWT.

In 2005, Hong Lam Marine ventured into the building of double-hull vessels. In 2007, the company went on to form a joint-venture company with the Japanese trading house, Toyota Tsusho, to build and own two 22,000 DWT tankers, SPECTRUM and SPLENDOUR. These two world’s largest purpose-built bunker tankers were delivered in 2009.

Hong Lam Marine works closely with the Maritime and Port Authority of Singapore (MPA) to implement green shipping practices. The company commissioned a series of 10 diesel-electric bunkering vessels, which were delivered between 2011 and 2013. They are also the first company in Singapore to use MPA approved mass flow meters on its vessels for bunker delivery. According to Mr Lim, these mass flow meters “can supply 15 to 20% more [fuel]” for their vessels and also save up to 3 hours per bunker delivery.

The company is also involved in a Joint Industry Project (JIP) to investigate the operational feasibility of liquefied natural gas (LNG) bunkering in Singapore in collaboration with 22 industry partners. Currently, the use of LNG in Singapore is hindered by the high operating costs required to purchase and transport it, as well as a lack of demand for it.

== Operations ==
Hong Lam Marine operates a fleet of 35 ships, including 10 diesel-electric bunker fuel and lubricant tankers. Six of them are used to transport marine fuels and four are for marine lubricant. These eco-friendly vessels are capable of reducing bunker consumption by 30 percent. The company is one of two contractors in Singapore providing transportation service of jet fuel from refineries for Singapore Changi Airport.

Hong Lam Marine is also involved in the transportation of petroleum products and chemicals in Asia and Australia.

Hong Lam Marine predominantly works with oil majors by providing services rather than engaging in the trading of oil. Some of their key customers are BP, Chevron, ExxonMobil, Petronas, Shell, Maersk and PIL (Pacific International Lines).

== Achievements ==
Selected accolades achieved by Hong Lam Marine:

- Flawless Performance Award (awarded by ExxonMobil): 2008 to 2012
- ISO 9001:2008 Certification: 2008

COEOM Singapore Top 5 Ship Owners Award: 2012

- Top Quartile Performance Award (awarded by Shell): 2013 to 14
- SMOU - INAUGURAL Tripartite Nautical Training Award

== See also ==
- Chartering (shipping)
- Tanker (ship)
