= Nauru Pacific Line =

National shipping line of the Republic of Naoero

House flag

The Nauru Pacific Line (NPL) is the national shipping line of the Republic of Naoero, founded in 1969. Its fleet consists of five owned and two leased ships, which travel throughout all of Oceania. It is loss-making and gets subventions from the state.

It is a member of the Pacific Forum Line, a joint venture between several national shipping lines established in 1977 after a dispute between the NPL and the Maritime Union of New Zealand.

== See also ==
- Economy of Nauru
- Nauru Phosphate Corporation
- Pacific Forum Line
- Republic of Nauru
- Nauru Maritime Port Authority
