= Hansa Shipping =

Shipping company based in Estonia

Hansa Shipping AS
- Industry: Shipping
- Founded: 1999
- Headquarters: Ahtri 6, Tallinn, Estonia
- Area served: Baltic Sea, North Sea, the Mediterranean Sea
- Key people: Andres Vahi (CEO)
- Parent: Baltic Maritime Logistics Group AS
- Website: hansashipping.ee

Hansa Shipping AS is an Estonian shipping concern founded in 1999 in Tallinn, Estonia. The company provides chartering, crew management and ship management services. Hansa Shipping operates a fleet of 56 dry cargo ships ranging in size from 3481 to 11048 DWT and deployed in the Baltic Sea, North Sea and the Mediterranean. 50 vessels of Hansa Shipping have an ice class.
