= Axel Camillo Eitzen (1883–1968) =

Axel Camillo Eitzen (27 July 1883 – 1 November 1968) was a Norwegian ship-owner.

He was born in Tønsberg as a son of ship-owner Axel Camillo Eitzen and Caroline Johanne Hansen (1857–1911). In 1911 he married Frida Falch, a daughter of a pharmacist in Larvik.

He finished secondary education in 1901, and then embarked on lengthy commercial studies in England, Germany, France and Belgium. In 1914 he became a co-owner in the family company Camillo Eitzen & Co., founded in 1883 and since growing to a major corporation. It was renamed to Tschudi & Eitzen in 1936.

His brother Johan emigrated to Uruguay to pursue enterprises there. Axel Camillo Eitzen died in 1968 and was buried at Ris.
