= Nor Lines =

Norwegian shipping and logistics company

Nor Lines AS
- Type: Private
- Industry: Shipping
- Headquarters: Stavanger, Norway
- Area served: Norway
- Revenue: NOK 700 million
- Number of employees: 150 (2007)
- Parent: Det Stavangerske Dampskibsselskap (50%); Hurtigruten (50%)
- Website: www.norlines.no

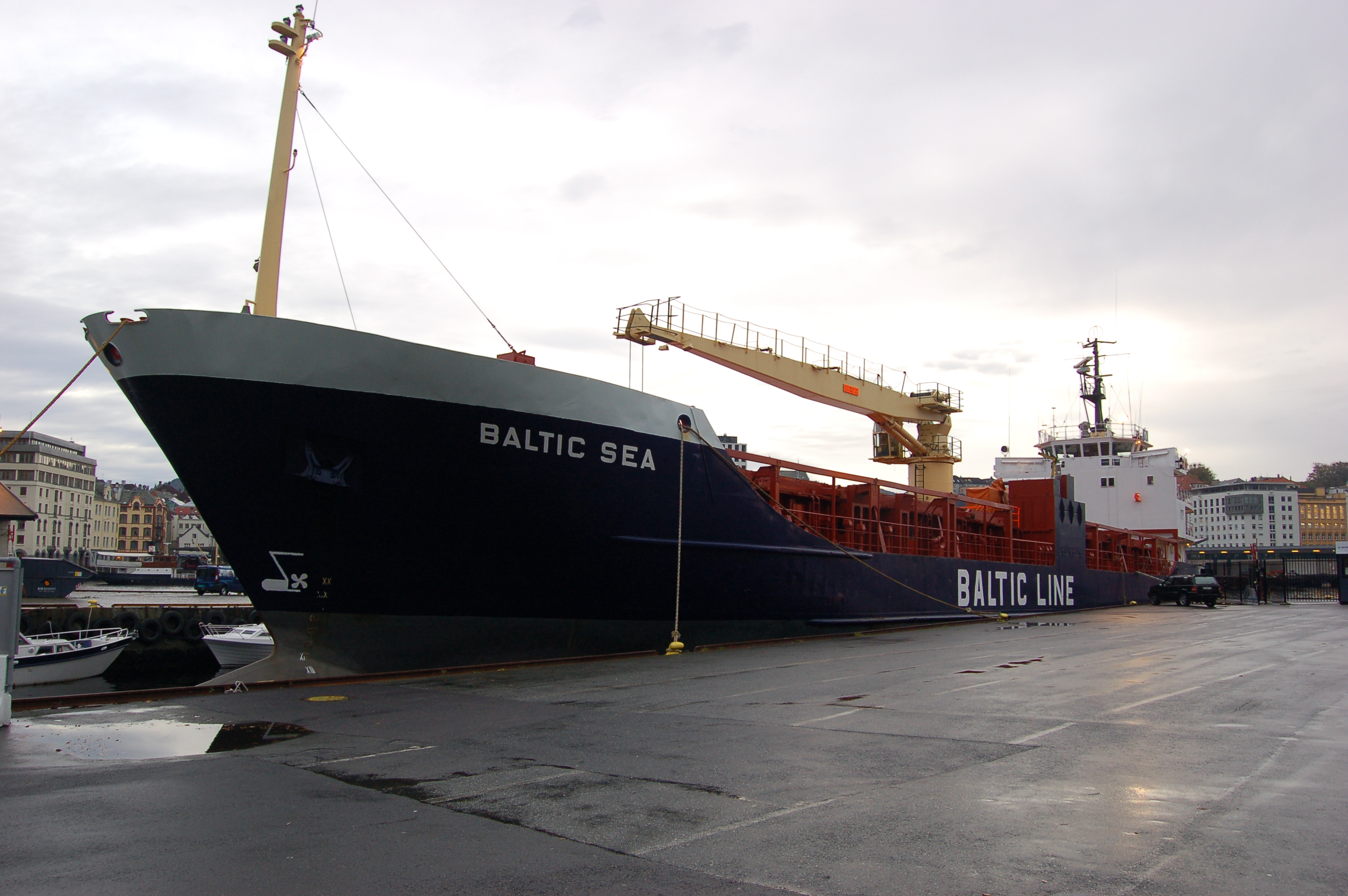
Baltic Sea operated by the Nor Lines subsidiary Baltic Line, at dock in Bergen

Nor Lines is a short sea liner shipping and logistics company based in Norway. The company operates 11 vessels in addition to disposition of the cargo sections of the Coastal Express. In addition to along the Norwegian coast, it through the subsidiary Baltic Line operates to Denmark and Finland. The company also manages truck and rail transport. It is owned Det Stavangerske Dampskibsselskap and Hurtigruten and was previously known as Nor-Cargo.
