= Shandong International Transportation Corporation =

Logistics and transportation company

Shandong Shipping Corporation is Chinese state-owned logistics and transportation company. The company mainly works in container shipping, freight forwarding, and integrated logistics, focusing on intra-Asia routes. It is part of the larger SITC International Holdings Company Limited, which is publicly listed on the Hong Kong Stock Exchange. It currently operates the third largest bulk carrier fleet and the largest LPG tanker fleet in China. It is also one of the top 20 global carriers of container ships.

== History ==
The company was founded in 1991 as Shandong International Transportation Corporation. It focused on international freight forwarding and transportation services. In 2000, the company restructured and formed the SITC Group. This change brought together various affiliated businesses under one brand.

== Operations ==
SITC offers container shipping and logistics services, including sea and land transport, warehousing, and freight forwarding. Its main focus is on intra-Asia trade routes. The company owns and operates a fleet of container vessels and has a network of offices and service partners throughout East and Southeast Asia.

== Other links ==
- Official website
