= OT Africa Line =

- Company type: Limited
- Industry: Transport, shipping, cargo
- Founded: 1975
- Headquarters: Birmingham, UK
- Products: Shipping, cargo, freight distribution
- Revenue: 93 million EUR (2007)
- Number of employees: 30+
- Website: http://www.otal.com

OT Africa Line was a specialist shipping line exclusively serving routes between Europe and West Africa. OTAL work exclusively in the transportation (container shipping fleet) industry, operating a line of container and RoRo vessels. It ceased trading in June 2011 when the brand was assimilated under the Delmas banner. OTAL, like Delmas, was a subsidiary of the CMA CGM Group, the third largest shipping company in the world.

== History ==
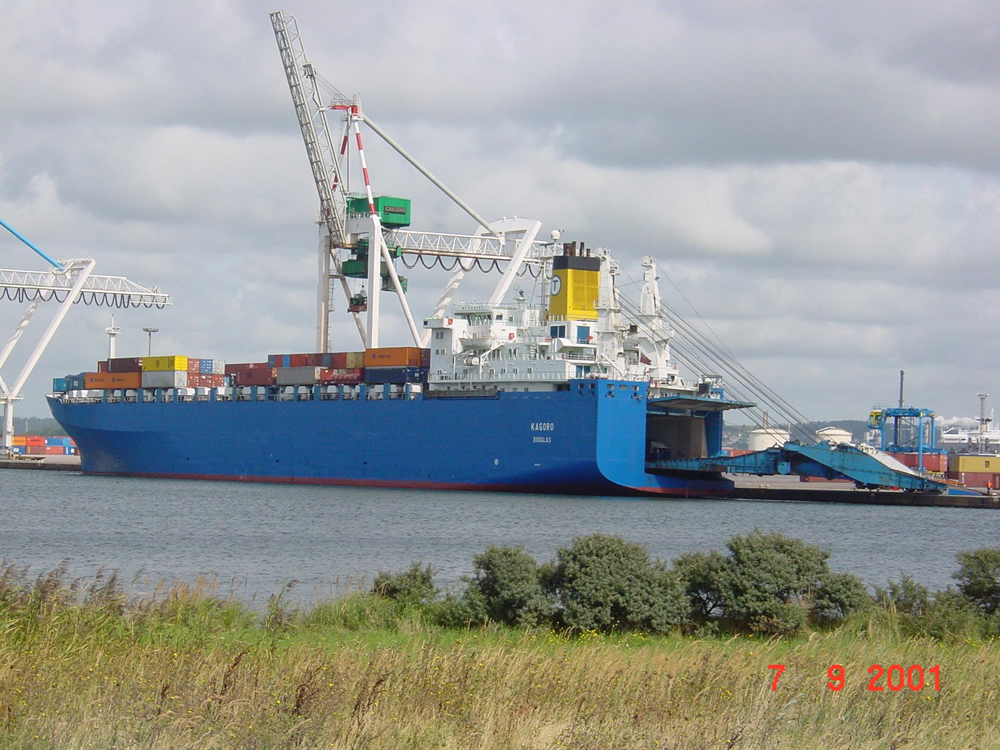
RoRo Vessel Kagoro

OT Africa Line was established in 1975 as a pioneering, roll-on roll-off congestion beating transport system to Nigeria. Nigeria went through a massive construction boom with the discovery of oil in the mid-1970s and the need to provide construction materials and equipment resulted in port congestion. Roll-on roll-off ships can load and discharge quickly, taking up a minimum of quay space and overcoming congestion difficulties.

In 1999 OTAL was taken over by Bolloré, a French investment and industrial holding group.

In 2006 CMA CGM purchases OT Africa Line, at the same time acquiring Delmas, Setramar and a 50% stake in SudCargos to become the third largest shipping company in the world.
