= Det Stavangerske Dampskibsselskap =

Norwegian transport and shipping company

Det Stavangerske Dampskibsselskap AS
- Company type: Private
- Industry: Shipping and transport
- Founded: 12 February 1855; 171 years ago
- Headquarters: Stavanger, Norway
- Area served: Scandinavia/Baltic
- Revenue: NOK 5 908 million (2017)
- Net income: NOK 68 million (2017)
- Number of employees: 11 (2026)
- Parent: Folke Hermansen AS
- Subsidiaries: Tide AS, DSD Cargo AS, DSD Shipping AS
- Website: dsd.no

Det Stavangerske Dampskibsselskap AS (DSD) is a private Norwegian transport and shipping company, established in 1855 with headquarters in Stavanger, Norway. The company operates internationally through its subsidiary companies DSD Shipping AS and DSD Cargo AS. The company is owned by the Hermansen family, through the holding company Folke Hermansen AS, after Folke Hermansen gained control of DSD in 1991. Chairman is Yuhong Jin Hermansen, while Ingvald Løyning has been CEO since 2015.

The DSD Group, where Det Stavangerske Dampskibsselskap AS (DSD) is the parent company, wholly or partly owns four subsidiary companies.

- DSD Shipping AS, a tanker company, which manages the technical and commercial operations of 7 crude oil and product tankers engaged in international shipping.
- DSD Cargo AS, a shipping company and transport company with a versatile fleet and linear traffic between the Scandinavian countries, the Baltic States, Poland and (Germany).
- Tide AS is one of Norway's and Denmark's largest bus companies. The business areas are public bus services, express- and airport bus services, as well as charter- and travel management.

== Company history ==
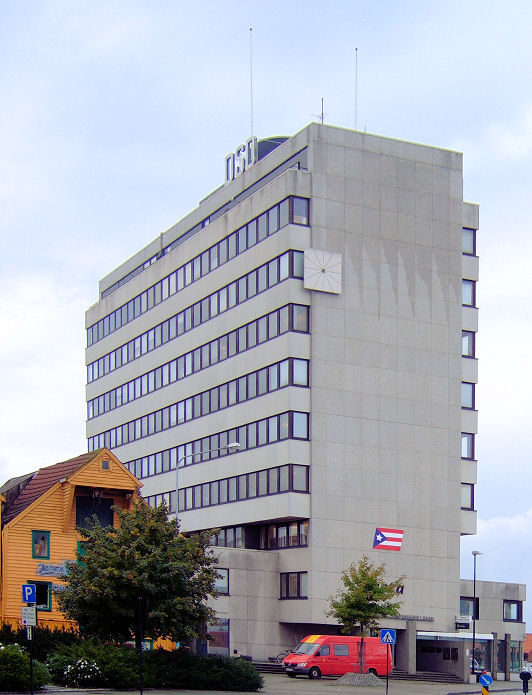
DSD headquarters in Stavanger, built in 1971

During a funeral at Jelsa, north of Stavanger, Norway, in 1854, the trader Ole Thorsen discussed the idea of launching a steamship company that would operate on a regular basis on the fjords of the county Rogaland, between Stavanger and Ryfylke. There were several important men present during the funeral and the idea struck. The idea was since debated in several newspaper articles in the fall of 1854.

A large article in the newspaper "Stavanger Amtstidende og Adresseavis" emphasised the need for better communication between Stavanger and Ryfylke and publicly endorsed the establishing of a steamship company. Stavanger Handelsforening, the chamber of commerce in Stavanger, at their general meeting on 9 November 1854, also endorsed the idea and started issuing shares for the establishing of a steamship company. On 12 February 1855, the founding General Assembly of what would become Det Stavangerske Dampskibsselskap was held. The initial shareholders gave the Executive Board power of attorney to purchase a steamship with 50–60 horsepower. The ship was contracted in Scotland. On Tuesday 30 October 1855, the ship named "Ryfylke" came to Stavanger, with its captain Johan Gjemre on the bridge. The ship was a sensation and drew much attention. On Saturday 3 November, "Ryfylke" had its maiden voyage with both invited guests and paying passengers, and on Wednesday 7 November 1855 its first regular trip on its designated route took place.

The first years of operation were difficult, with too little revenue. Revenue from mail freight eased the burden, but at the general meeting in 1858, proposals were made for the dissolution of the company. A decision in the Norwegian Parliament Stortinget on state subsidies for private steamship was a turning point. At the same time, Stavanger was developing rapidly. The herring industry was good, which laid the foundation for much of the future shipping and the prosperity of trading. In 1867 DSD got its second ship, the 125 feet long steamship "Stavanger". In 1869, the steamship "Haukelid" followed and the year after the steamship "Skjold". After this "Ryfylke" was taken out of regular operation and used as a reserve ship. From then on, the company was profitable.

In recent times, DSD has had a number of difficult years behind it. From 2011 to 2015, the traditional Stavanger company had a total pre-tax loss of NOK 770 million. In 2016, the results were positive for the first time since 2010, with pre-tax profit of NOK 71.8 million. The reason for this was a significant improvement in revenue by the ferry company Norled, and also improvement by DSD Shipping.

2017 was even better, as the DSD Group had a turnover of NOK 5.9 billion, an increase of 70 percent from NOK 3.5 billion the year before, and a pre-tax profit of NOK 68 million. The reason for the enormous growth was that DSD became a sole proprietor of the Tide bus company in 2017, which was subsequently made a subsidiary of the group, and that Nor Lines AS, had been sold to the shipping company Samskip.

In May 2019, DSD decided to sell Norled AS to CBRE Group and CapMan for an estimated 3-4½ billion NKR. Norled is one of Norway's largest maritime and passenger transport companies, operating ferry and express ferry routes in fjords and along the coast of Norway.

== Company logo ==
House flag of Det Stavangerske Dampskibsselskap

The flag and the motif that DSD uses as a logo dates back to 1903. The company's employees were invited to make suggestions for a flag and a draft designed by chief mate Ommund Thingbø won. It is unclear where Thingbø picked up the idea, but the base was the three red rings that were painted around the chimneys of all the ships that Det Stavangerske Dampskibsselskap operated. At that time it was also common with stars in the flag, which became an element in the motif.

The flag has led to some controversy, as it is almost identical to the flag of the U.S. territory of Puerto Rico. At two occasions, Puerto Rico has formally requested Det Stavangerske Dampskibsselskap to get the company to change the flag, the first time through the Norwegian Ministry of Foreign Affairs during the 1950s. Lawyers have ruled that since the flag was in use many years before Puerto Rico formally got theirs, there is no violation of international rules. The flags are also not quite the same as the star of the company's flag tilts slightly compared to the star on the flag of Puerto Rico. Although the design of the Puerto Rican flag is actually eight years older than the flag of DSD, it was not officially approved as a national flag until 1952 (because of a now-repealed federal law that banned the flying of Puerto Rico flag, largely seen as an attempt by the U.S. government to suppress Puerto Rican identity and the Puerto Rican independence movement). Puerto Rico is also not an independent and sovereign state, and their flag can only be hoisted on official buildings along with the American Stars and Stripes.
