= Tankerska plovidba =

Croatian shipping company

Tankerska plovidba d.d.
- Company type: Public
- Industry: Ship transport
- Founded: 1955
- Headquarters: Zadar, Croatia
- Key people: Captain Mario Pavić, CEO
- Website: www.tankerska.hr/en/

Tankerska plovidba d.d. is a Croatian shipping company. Founded in 1955 in Zadar, the company transports bulk cargo, crude oil, petroleum products and passengers.

== History ==
The merchant navy of the FNRJ was concentrated in Rijeka, in the shipping companies of the Jugoslavenska linijska plovidba, the Jadranska linijska plovidba and the Jadranska slobodna plovidba. In 1955, tankers were separated from Jugoslavenska linijska plovidba and a specialized company for the transport of liquid cargo by sea, Jugoslavenska tankerska plovidba, was founded in Zadar. It was assigned the tankers MT Jajce, MT Lendava and MT Goilo, which transported the first tons of crude oil from the Black Sea port for the needs of the refinery in Rijeka, and the first business partner was INA. In 1959, Brodogradilište Zadar was added to the company, which since 1963 operated under the name Jugoslavenska tankerska plovidba - Branch Shipyard Zadar, and its main activity was shipbuilding and overhaul, initially of ships of its own navigation, and at the end of the 1960s it was one of the most important Adriatic overhaul shipyards. In 1962, the Brodarsko poduzeće Zadar was added to the Jugoslavenska Tankerska plovidba, and in 1969, the Tourist and Hotel Company Turisthotel. Thus, a new economic activity entered the composition of the company, and since 1970 it has operated under the name Jugotanker - Turisthotel. In 1972, there was a merger into a working organization, the company as a whole was again named Jugoslavenska tankerska plovidba, and each organization had its own name - Jugotanker, Turisthotel and Shipyard. During the 1970s, Jugoslavenska tankerska plovidba was a large and complex enterprise; in addition to the transportation of all types of cargo by sea, tourism and shipbuilding activities, it also included warehouses for the storage of liquid cargo and foreign trade, representation and consignment. Jugotanker is also registered for foreign trade operations, and the focus on the international market imposed the need to establish a company abroad - Adriatic Agenturen B. v. in Rotterdam and Jadera Holding A.G. Zürich. In 1980, Jugotanker founded Tankerkomerc, a company for internal and external trade, which dealt with the supply of ships. Since Jugoslavenska tankerska plovidba was engaged in various activities, there were often organizational changes, so since 1981 it operated as SOUR (complex organizations of joint work) Jugoslavenska tankerska plovidba with working organizations Jugotanker, Turisthotel, Tankerkomerc and Shipyard; Alan Shipping in London joined the fleet, and Adriatic Agenturen in Rotterdam joined Tankerkomerc. The fleet was registered in 1990 as the company Jugotanker p.o., in 1992 the name of the company was changed to Tankerska plovidba p.o. Zadar, and with the conversion in 1994 to Tankerska plovidba d.d. Zadar.

Tankerska Next Generation d.d. was founded in August 2014, after which Tankerska plovidba d.d. as its founding share brought in two existing product tankers of conventional design, MT Velebit and MT Vinjerac, funds and a contract for the newbuilding MT Dalmacija with delivery in the fourth quarter of 2015. In February 2015, TNG entered the capital market by inviting institutional and private investors to participate in the Initial public offering, which ultimately raised HRK 208 million (US$31 million) at a price of HRK 65.00 per share. The funds collected in the IPO were used for the acquisition of two contracts for newbuildings of MT Vukovar and MT Zoilo in the South Korean Hyundai Mipo shipyard. The first of the two new buildings was delivered and employed already in April, just 78 days after the IPO, and the second in July 2015. TNG continued to increase capital already in June 2015, estimating that market conditions in the newbuilding market, as well as freight rates, are at levels that will fully justify the acquisition of a new contract for newbuilding, so the largest shareholders invested an additional HRK 104 million (US$16 million). The collected funds were used in a very short time for the acquisition of another contract for new construction MT Pag, which was delivered in December 2015. The Tankerska Next Generation (TPNG) share was listed on the official market of the Zagreb Stock Exchange until December 22, 2022.

In the desire for competitiveness Tankerska bought two new high speed craft in May 2023 and named ships HSC Kalelarga and HSC Proversa, with idea od chartering them in Adriatic Sea. In the same time company offered HSC Kolovare and HSC Putamika for sale in competition published by state owned shipping company Jadrolinija. They eventually won the bid and sold the ships in June 2023 for 13.42 million euros. In August 2023 company decided to sell MT Donat, the oldest cargo ship in the fleet, to the buyer from Dubai, for allegedly 40 million dollars.

During November 2023, Tankerska plovidba published that controls 39% of share in Atlantska plovidba and on 10 January 2024 Croatian financial services supervisory agency (HANFA) approved announcement of the takeover bid. By 20 February 2024 Tankerska plovidba reached a 64% stake.

== Fleet ==
Tankerska plovidba manages a fleet of 14 cargo ships of which six are managed by subsidiary Tankerska Next Generation.

Ship	Built	Type	DWT	LOA(m)	Beam(m)	Draught(m)	Flag	Ref
MV Ugljan	2010	bulk carrier	37,728	189.99	28.50	10.40	Bahamas	
MV Obrovac	2010	bulk carrier	34,439	180.00	30.00	9.92	Bahamas	
MV Ravni Kotari	2010	bulk carrier	34,733	180.00	30.00	9.92	Bahamas	
MT Frankopan	2017	tanker	114,532	249.90	44.00	15.12	Croatia	
MT Rava	2017	tanker	114,358	249.90	44.00	15.12	Croatia	
MT Olib	2009	tanker	108,433	247.24	42.04	15.02	Croatia	
MT Dugi Otok	2008	tanker	108,414	247.24	42.04	15.02	Croatia	
MT Velebit	2011	tanker	49,999	195.09	32.23	12.52	Croatia	
MT Vinjerac	2011	tanker	49,999	195.09	32.23	12.50	Croatia	
MT Vukovar	2015	tanker	49,990	183.00	32.20	13.33	Malta	
MT Zoilo	2015	tanker	49,990	183.12	32.20	13.33	Malta	
MT Dalmacija	2015	tanker	49,990	183.00	32.20	13.26	Malta	
MT Pag	2015	tanker	49,990	183.00	32.20	13.29	Croatia	

Tankerska plovidba also owns six high speed craft for passenger transport in Croatia.

Ship	Built	Type	Capacity	LOA(m)	Beam(m)	Draught(m)	Flag	Ref
HSC Nona Ana	1990	catamaran	200	28.75	8.00	2.90	Croatia	
HSC Aenona	2016	catamaran	200	33.00	8.50	1.15	Croatia	
HSC Arta	2017	catamaran	317	39.00	10.00	1.26	Croatia	
HSC Anastazija	2018	catamaran	300	29.95	9.00	1.37	Croatia	
HSC Kalelarga	2022	catamaran	312	39.00	10.00	1.26	Croatia	
HSC Proversa	2022	catamaran	312	39.00	10.00	1.26	Croatia	

== See also ==
- Official website
