= Asian Marine Transport Corporation =

Shipping company based in Cebu City, Philippines

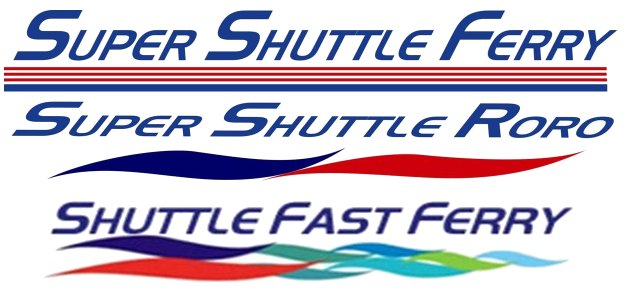
- Company type: Private company
- Industry: Shipping
- Founded: 1999; 27 years ago in Cebu City
- Headquarters: 38 Gorordo Avenue, Cebu City, Philippines
- Area served: Philippines
- Key people: Paul Rodriguez (CEO)
- Products: Super Shuttle Ferry, Super Shuttle RORO, Shuttle Fast Ferry
- Number of employees: 1,080 (as of 2017)
- Website: supershuttleroro.com

Asian Marine Transport Corporation (AMTC) is a Filipino passenger and freight shipping company established in 1999 in Cebu City, Philippines. It owns and operates the Super Shuttle RORO, Super Shuttle Ferry and Shuttle Fast Ferry brand of RORO and ROPAX ferries.

== Fleet ==
=== Current Vessels ===
Super Shuttle RORO

- Super Shuttle RORO 7
- Super Shuttle RORO 9
- Super Shuttle RORO 14
- Super Shuttle Rocon 16
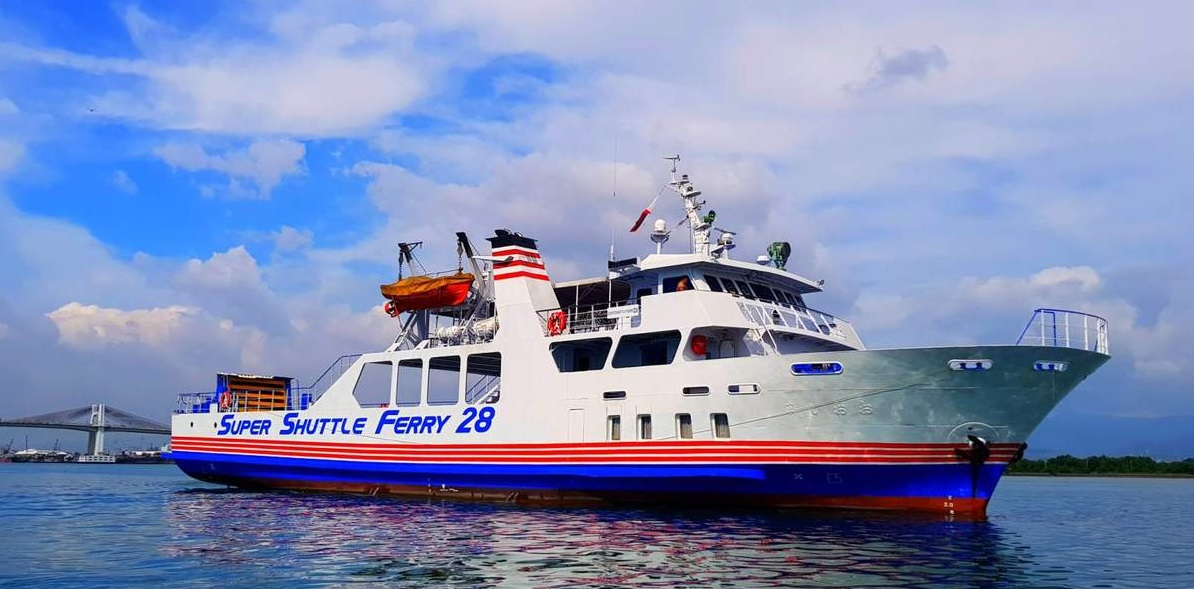
  Super Ferry Shuttle Ferry 28

Super Shuttle Ferry

- Super Shuttle Ferry 5
- Super Shuttle Ferry 17
- Super Shuttle Ferry 27
- Super Shuttle Ferry 28

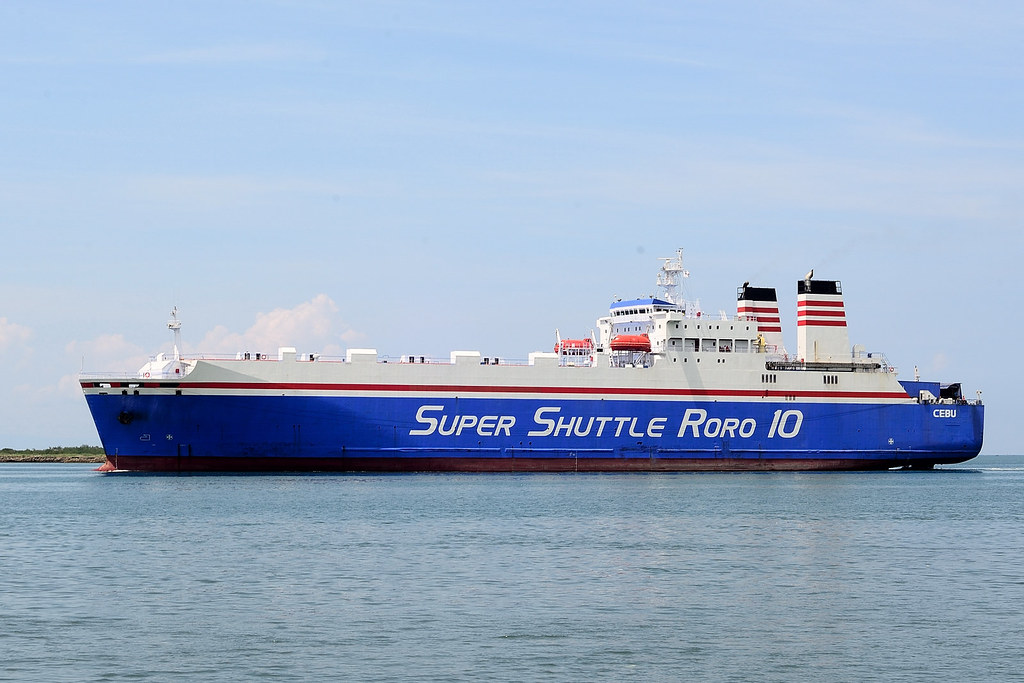
Super Shuttle RORO 10

== History ==
AMTC was incorporated in 1999 in Cebu City, Philippines with the goal of providing end-to-end transport and logistics services as well as shipping services for inter-island passengers and cargoes.

That same year, it began operating the Super Shuttle RORO brand of inter-island logistics service using refurbished German RORO vessels. It later started offering passenger services through its Super Shuttle Ferry and Shuttle Fast Ferry brands. Since its establishment, the company has grown to become the largest ship-tonnage owner and operator in the Philippines, serving 32 ports of call. The company has an estimated nationwide market share of 35% for containerized cargoes and 80% for rolling cargo.

In 2010, the company began using the Batangas International Port as it hub.

In May 2017, the company was selected to transport cargo for the newly opened Davao–General Santos–Bitung trade route between the Philippines and Indonesia. Philippine President Rodrigo Duterte and Indonesian President Joko Widodo personally led the inauguration of the new trade route in Davao's Kudos Port. AMTC's RORO vessel, MV Super Shuttle RORO 12 brought to first container vans from Davao and General Santos to Bitung and back. However, due to low cargo volume, the company withdrew its vessel from the route and was replaced by a smaller cargo vessel operated by an Indonesian company.

In September 2017, AMTC won the Priority Integration Logistics Sector Award in the ASEAN Business Awards.

== Incidents and accidents ==
- On 29 July 2012, MV Super Shuttle RORO 1 ran aground and caught fire in Looc Bay, off the coast of Looc, Romblon, after it was battered by strong waves amid the onslaught of Typhoon Gener. The vessel was on its way to Odiongan, Romblon from Dumaguit Port in New Washington, Aklan when it was caught in the typhoon and decided to seek shelter in Looc Bay.
- On 21 August 2012, MV Super Shuttle Ferry 15 ran aground in the vicinity of Merida, Leyte after it suffered an engine problem while en route from Ormoc to Cebu City. There were no injuries or fatalities among the 191 passengers and crew. The Maritime Industry Authority (MARINA) temporarily suspended the operation of the company's 21 vessels on 24 August pending an explanation from the company regarding the incident. The suspension was lifted on 30 and 31 August.
- On 14 September 2014, MV Super Shuttle RORO 7 capsized while anchored just off the Port of Manila in Manila Bay after being battered by huge waves from Typhoon Luis. The Philippine Coast Guard rescued all 15 crew of the vessel.
- On 2 August 2016, MV Super Shuttle RORO 3 suffered engine problems in the vicinity of Malapascua Island in Cebu while en route from Masbate City to Cebu City. The vessel was towed to Ouano Wharf in Mandaue. There were no injuries or fatalities.
- On 26 December 2016, MV Super Shuttle RORO 5 ran aground in Mabini, Batangas after being swept off by huge waves amid the onslaught of Typhoon Nina. There were no fatalities or injuries but the ship leaked around 100 liters of bunker fuel along the area where it ran aground.
- On 23 March 2017, two crew members of the tugboat MTug Super Shuttle Tugboat 1 were kidnapped by Abu Sayyaf terrorists off the coast of Sibago Island in Hadji Mohammad Ajul, Basilan. The tugboat was towing MV Super Shuttle RORO 9, which suffered an engine problem while en route from General Santos to Zamboanga City, when the incident happened.
- On 23 October 2018, MV Super Shuttle Ferry 18 suffered engine problems while en route from Roxas, Capiz to Caticlan Jetty Port in Malay, Aklan. The Philippine Coast Guard rescued all 142 passengers of the vessel. There were no injuries or fatalities.
- On 26 October 2020, MV Super Shuttle RORO 12 ran aground while seeking shelter in the vicinity of Bonito Island in Tingloy, Batangas due to inclement weather from Typhoon Quinta. There were no injuries or fatalities.
