= Pacific Forum Line =

Shipping line in Polynesia

- House flag
- Industry: Shipping
- Founded: 1976; 50 years ago
- Owner: Government of Samoa, Neptune Pacific
- Parent: Pacific Forum Line Limited
- Website: pacificforumline.com

Pacific Forum Line (PFL) is a regional shipping line in Polynesia. Established in 1976 by the Pacific Islands Forum to ensure a regional shipping service, it was purchased in 2012 by the government of Samoa. It is currently operated as a joint venture with Neptune Pacific Line.

== History ==
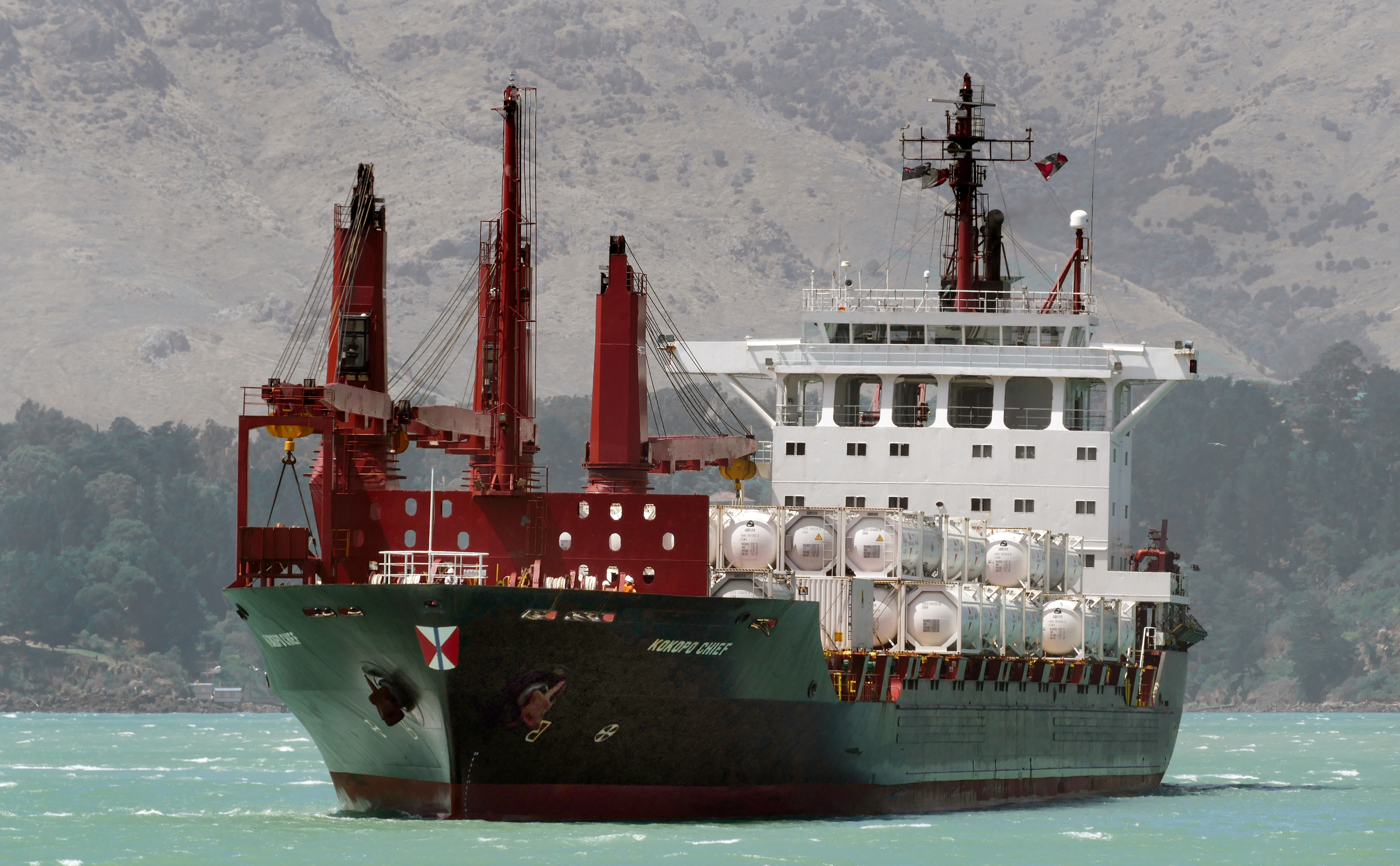
The Kokopo Chief, a PFL container ship

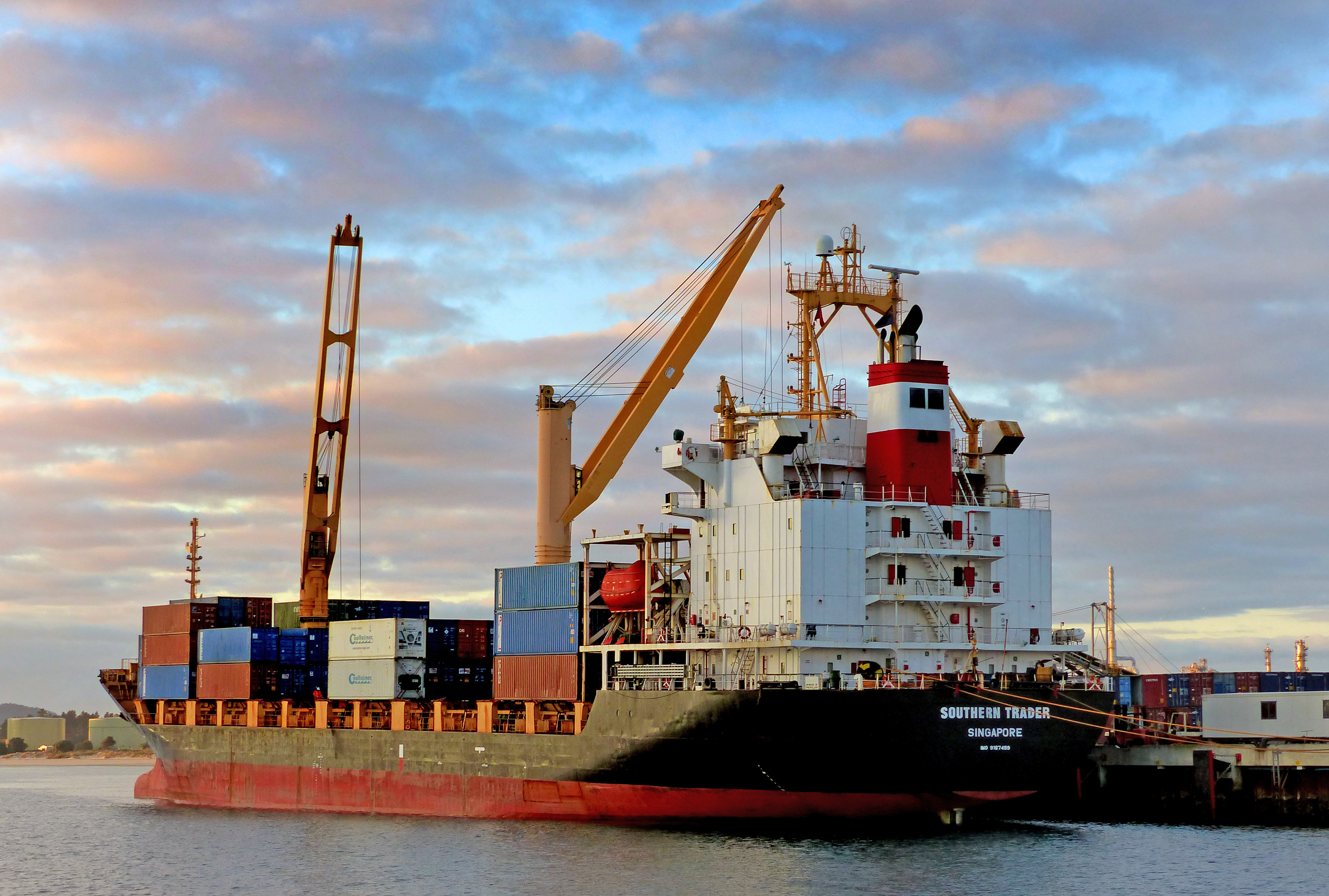
MV Southern Trader

The Pacific Forum Line was born from concern over the deterioration of traditional island tramp services due to containerisation. At the South Pacific Forum in Nauru in 1976 pacific nations agreed to establish a shipping line to ensure regular shipping services for the islands and encourage development. The initial memorandum of understanding required the line to be incorporated in Samoa, operate a viable shipping service and attempt to make a profit, with any profit allocated between founding nations. The initial owners - the governments of the Cook Islands, Fiji, Kiribati, Nauru, New Zealand, Papua New Guinea, Samoa, Solomon Islands, and Tonga - all had an equal say in governance of the line, though each had a different financial stake. Tuvalu, the Marshall Islands and Niue later became shareholders.

The first services began in May 1978, with a ship serving Australia, Fiji, Samoa, Tonga, and New Zealand. The company was immediately in financial trouble, and by 1981 was in danger of collapse. Losses in the first three years of operations were more than US$16 million, and it continued to be supported by member nations. The line finally became profitable in the late 1980's. By 1998, twenty years after being established, it was seen as an example of successful regionalism and had finally begun paying dividends.

In 2007 the Forum received an apparently unsolicited bid from Pacific International Lines to buy the company. This was followed by bids from Swire Shipping and Fiji Water-Neptune Pacific Line. An extraordinary shareholders' meeting in March 2008 rejected any proposal to sell the company. Following the meeting, leaked emails showed that CEO John MacLennan had actively promoted the sale.

=== Purchase by Samoa ===
Heavy losses in 2011 caused several of the owner countries to consider selling their stake in 2012. Following a bid by Singaporean company Sofrana, the Samoan government bought out the other countries in October 2012. In September 2013 it sold a 50 percent stake in the company to Neptune Pacific Line, a subsidiary of Roll Global. The deal required PFL to continue to serve every Forum country except Tuvalu, Niue and the Marshall Islands.

In 2016 the company merged with Polynesian Shipping Line.

== Operations ==
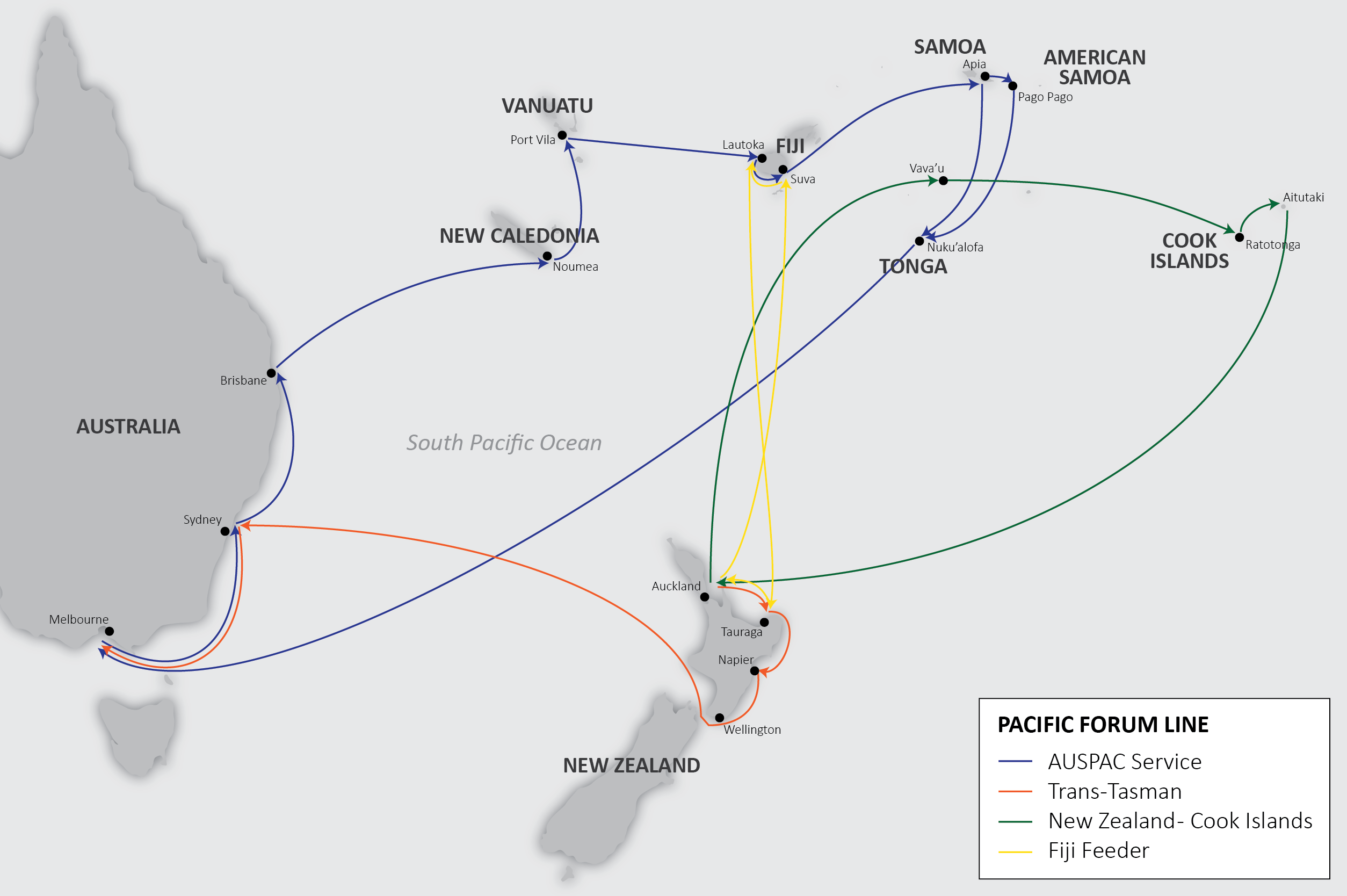
Pacific Forum Line routes in 2015

Pacific Forum Line Limited the parent, is registered in Apia, Samoa and the operating arm – Pacific Forum Line (N.Z) Limited is located in Auckland, New Zealand. Pacific Forum Line has also set up agency divisions in many of the ports they service.

Pacific Forum Line vessels operate on five routes that connect the Pacific Islands to New Zealand and Australia and provide an important South Pacific Inter-island link. PFL carries containerised and break-bulk cargo on the New Zealand and Australian trade vessels. In addition, to and from Australia bulk liquids are also carried in purpose built tanks.

=== Current fleet ===
PFL's current vessels include:

- Capitaine Tasman
- Capitaine Dampier
- Southern Moana
- Kokopo Chief
- Southern Trader

== Accidents ==
In April 2004 the captain of the Forum Fiji II died after being washed overboard 320 km south of Tonga.

In August 2009 the Forum Samoa II ran aground on the reef at Apia harbour after suffering engine trouble. It was freed in September.
