= Lykiardopoulo =

Greek shipping company

- Formerly: Drake Shipping Co. Ltd
- Industry: Shipping
- Headquarters: Kefalonia, Greece

Lykiardopulo was a Greek shipping company founded in Kefalonia, which now goes by the name Neda Maritime. The company has also used the name Drake Shipping Co. Ltd.

== History ==
The Lykiardopoulos family had been involved in shipping since the middle of 18th Century. By Lloyds 1904, they were presented as N.G. Lykiardopoulos with a yellow and black quartered flag with the black letters N and L. The 1912 issue presented the company as N.D. Lykiardopulos with a white flag with red star.

Nikolaos Lykiardopulo opened an office in London in 1910.

After 1929, the company's name was Lykiardopulo. In 1936, Lykiardopulo then established Drake Shipping Co. in London with the purchase of a second hand tramp steamer and bought others during and after the war. By 1954, it operated four ships named the Merchant Prince (1939, freight cargo ship), Merchant Duke (1943, freight cargo ship), Merchant Knight (1952, tanker), and Merchant Baron (1953, tanker). These were either transferred to Greek registry or sold. By the 1960s Drake Shipping Co had become defunct. .Neda Maritime is now fully based in Piraeus, Greece.

Neda Maritime manages 25 ships as of early 2024.
