= TOWT =

French cargo ship operator

TransOceanic Wind Transport
- Company type: SAS
- Industry: Maritime transportation
- Founded: 2011
- Founder: Guillaume Le Grand & Diana Mesa
- Headquarters: Le Havre, France
- Services: Maritime cargo transport of alcoholic beverages
- Website: https://www.towt.eu/

TransOceanic Wind Transport or TOWT is a French shipowner based known for operating predominantly sailing vessels for maritime cargo transport across the Atlantic Ocean.

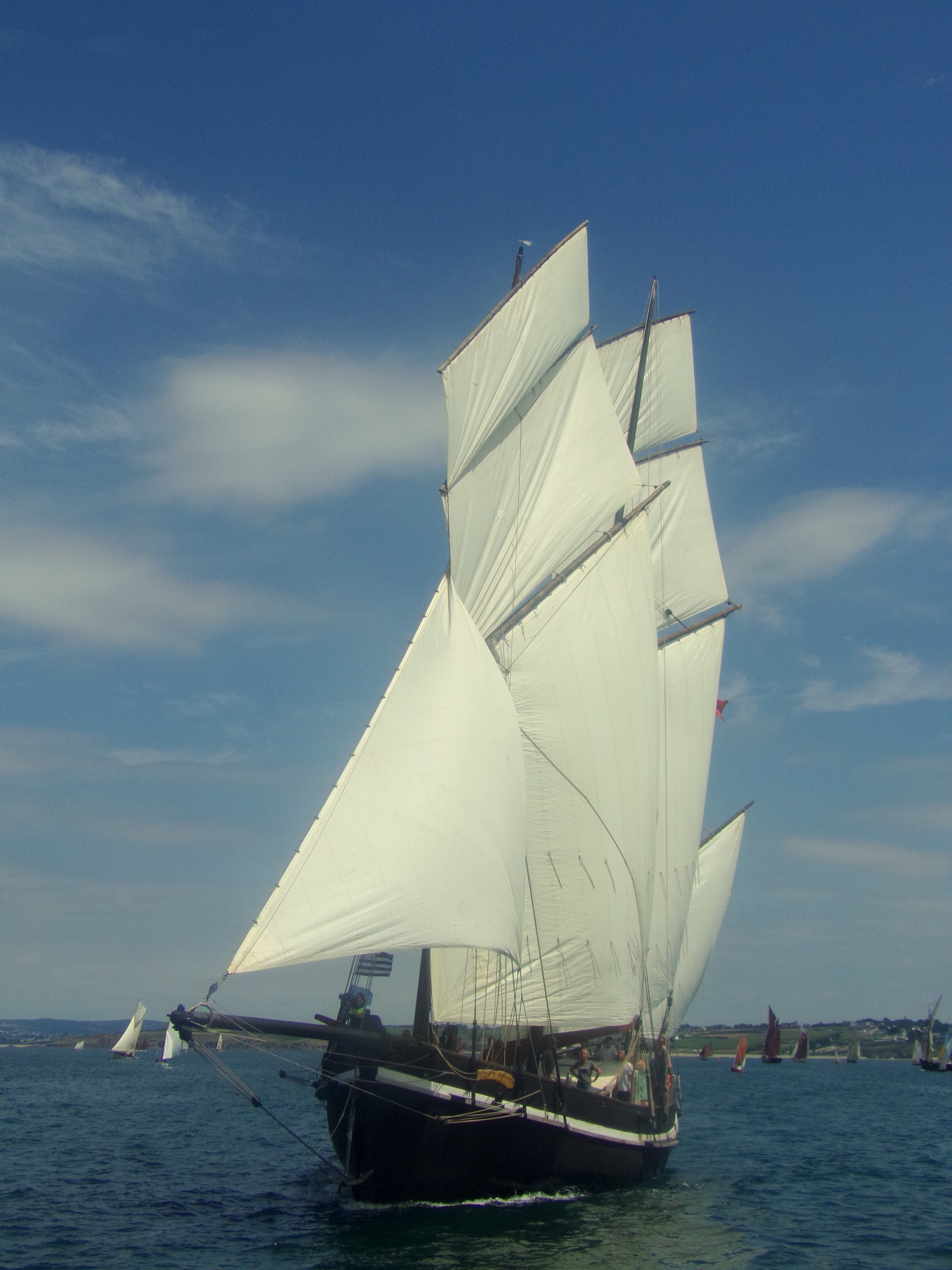
The lugger Greyhound, operated by the company

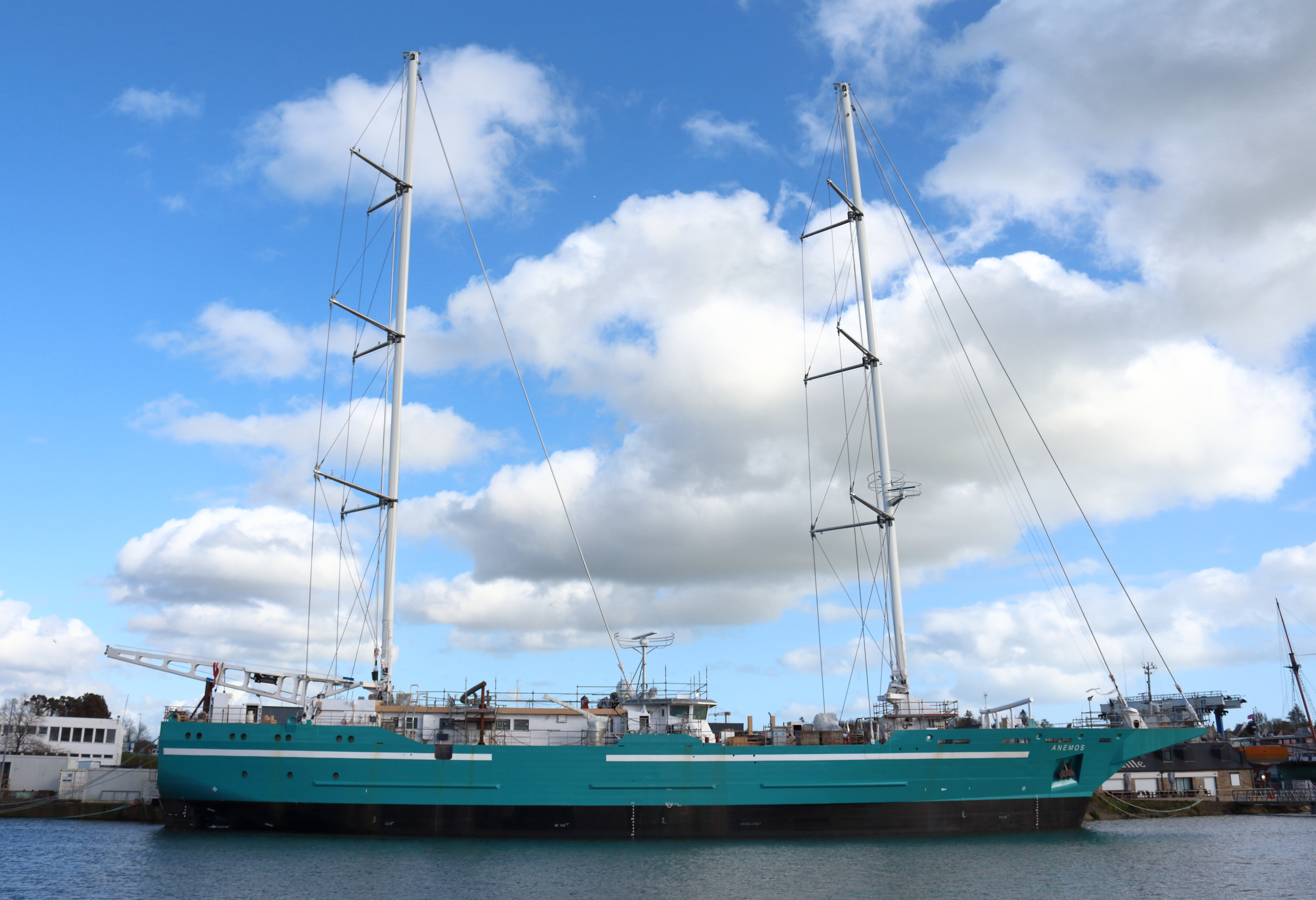
Anemos (maiden voyage 2024)

The company was established in Brest in 2011, but since 2020 it has been headquartered in Le Havre.

== Business activities ==
From the beginning of the company, its founders Guillaume Le Grand and Diana Mesa stated that their mission was to take sailing to another scale, in order to contribute to decarbonising maritime transport.

TOWT usually transports high-added-value cargo such as cocoa, rum, tea and coffee. The ships take transatlantic routes, as well as European cabotage destinations. About sixty trips were made between 2011 and 2022, for about 1,500 tons transported.

As of 2024, the company showcased total revenue of €1 million from 18 chartered cargo boats.

== Vessels ==
TOWT has chartered old cargo sailboats from British, Dutch and Scandinavian owners since its establishment in 2011. As of 2024, the company operates 18 chartered sailing cargo boats.

In 2024, the company launched its first newly constructed cargo ship, the 1,000-ton sailing ship Anemos. The ship was built by the PIRIOU shipyard in Concarneau, France and outfitted in Giurgiu, Romania, as the first of the company's own Phoenix class of sailing cargo ships. Beginning its maiden cargo voyage across the Atlantic in August 2024, the 81-meter (266 ft)-long ship was touted by the media as the world’s largest wind-powered cargo ship.
