= Western Bulk =

Dry bulk shipping company

Western Bulk AS
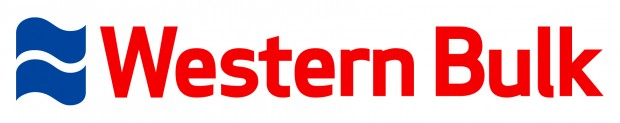
- Type: Subsidiary
- Founded: 1982
- Headquarters: Oslo, Norway
- Area served: Global
- Key people: Hans Aasnæs (CEO) Bengt A. Rem (Chairman); Kenneth Thu Egil Husby
- Parent: Kistefos
- Website: westernbulk.com

Western Bulk is a global dry bulk shipping company operating around 150 vessels in the handysize to panamax category. The headquarter is located in Oslo, and the company has offices in Singapore, Seattle, Santiago and Casablanca.

Western Bulk is owned by about 225 shareholders, with Kistefos AS controlling about 75% of the shares through two of its wholly owned subsidiaries.

== History ==
The company was founded in 1982, and between 1993 and 2001 the company was listed on the Oslo Stock Exchange. In 2006 the company was taken fully over by the controlling company Kistefos. In June 2017, Western Bulk was registered on the N-OTC list under the ticker "WEST".
