= Atlantska plovidba =

Croatian shipping company

Atlantska plovidba d.d.
- House flag
- Type: Public
- Traded as: ZSE: ATPL
- ISIN: HRATPLRA0008
- Industry: Ship transport
- Founded: 27 May 1955
- Headquarters: Dubrovnik, Croatia
- Key people: Captain Pero Kulaš, President
- Website: www.atlant.hr

Atlantska plovidba d.d. is a Croatian shipping company. Founded in 1955 in Dubrovnik, the company works mostly in the dry bulk and heavy lift markets, serving both domestic and international clients.

== History ==
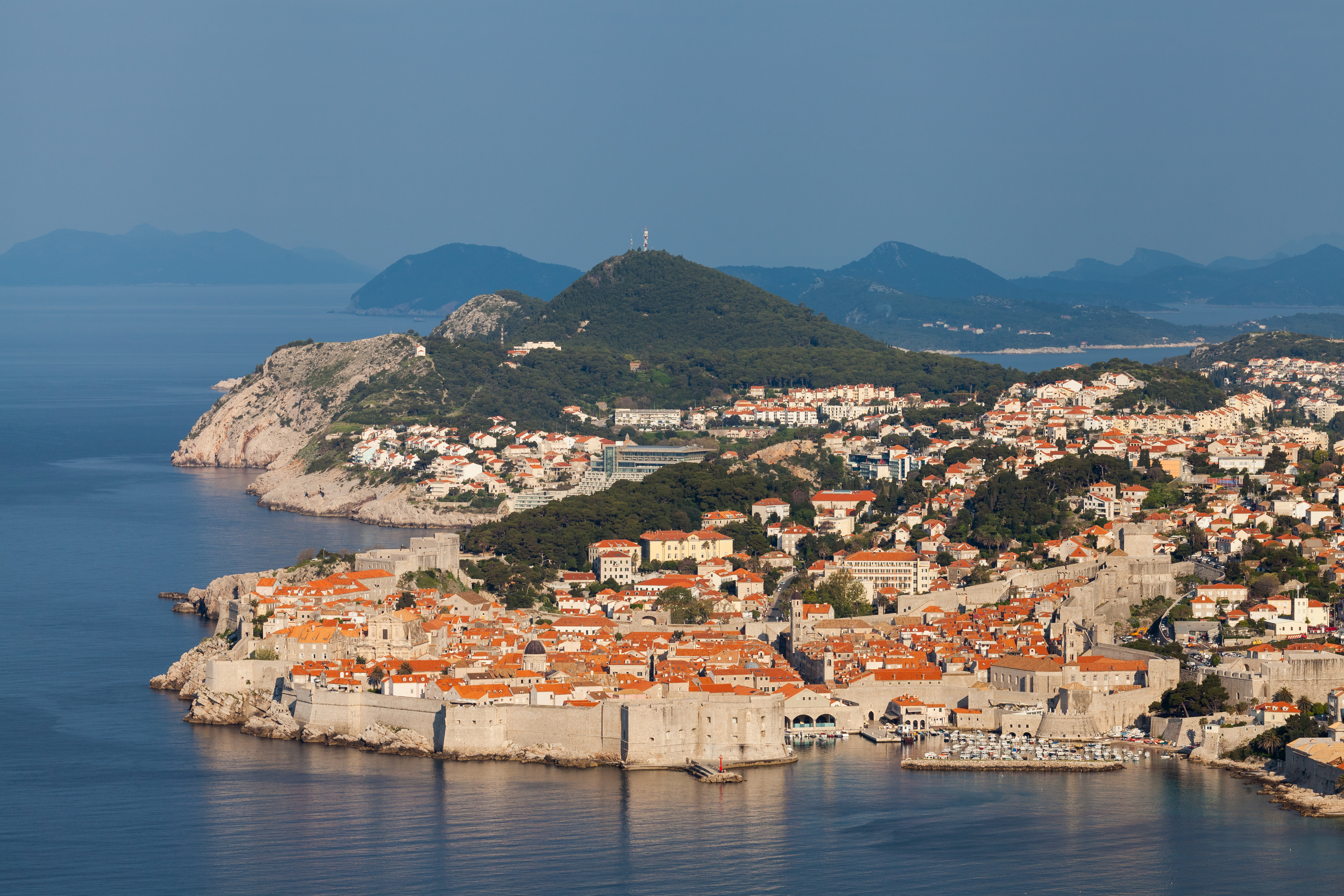
Atlantska plovidba is headquartered in the walled city of Dubrovnik.

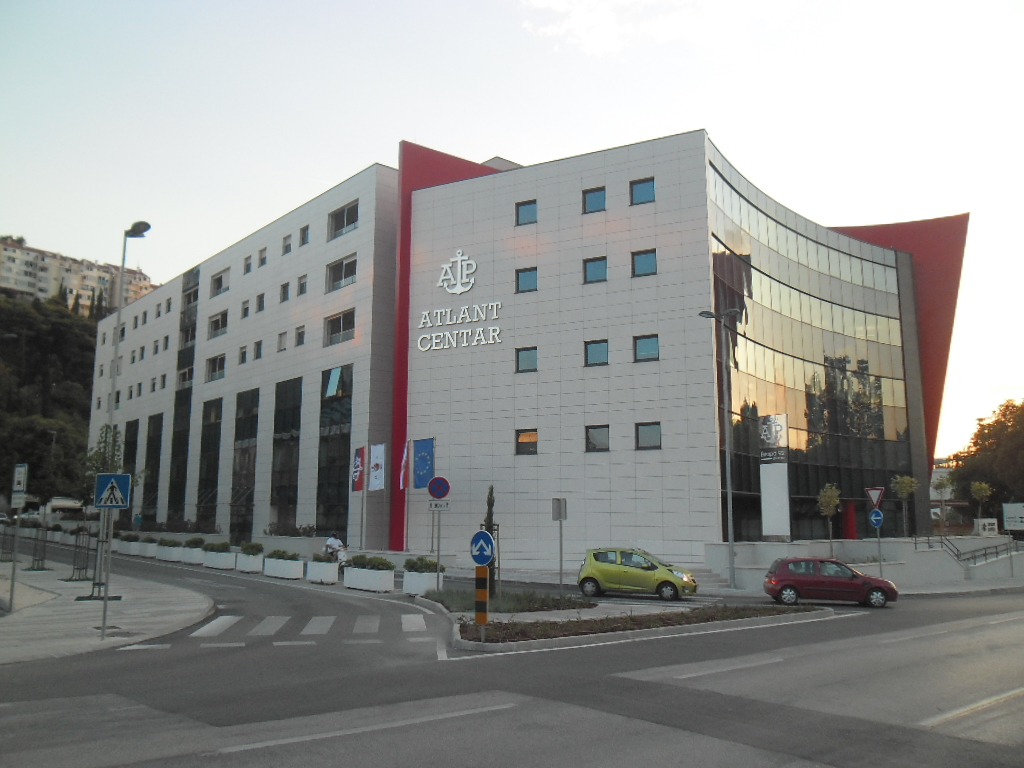
Building of Atlantska plovidba

The history of Atlantska plovidba is tied closely to that of Dubrovnik. At the outset of World War II, the fleet of Dubrovnik consisted of about 200,000 gross register tons (GRT), and represented about half of Yugoslavia's merchant fleet. In addition, Dubrovnik had a financial stake in 30% to 60% of the remaining Yugoslav steamship companies. However, by the end of World War II, only nine ships totalling 42,000 GRT survived.

These nine ships were nationalized and given to the Yugoslav company Jugolinija based in Rijeka, leaving Dubrovnik with no merchant fleet. After several years, citizens of Dubrovnik petitioned Yugoslavia's State Executive Committee to denationalize the fleet. The state agreed, and as a result, Atlantska plovidba was founded 27 May 1955.

In the beginning, the company was given seven tramp steamers totaling 35,038 GRT. These ships burnt coal, were capable of six to eight knots, and were, on average, 35 years old. The company took delivery of the ships between 19 December 1955, and 1957.

The early post-war years were very profitable for the company, allowing it to reinvest in itself. At the same time, the Yugoslavian government became interested in building ships. This combination allowed Atlantska Plovidba to build a fleet of 20 ships of a combined 183,000 GRT by 1965. In addition to tripling its tonnage, the new-building programme cut the average ship age to 17 years.

After building several new ships at Trieste, and the shipyards at Split and Trogir, Atlantska plovidba scrapped the last of the original nine ships in 1970. By 1975, the average ship age in the fleet was down to 7.5 years. In 1976, Atlantska plovidba built their largest dry cargo ship, MV Jadran at 72,887 DWT, and in the 1980s, added 5 panamax vessels, increasing fleet tonnage by 310,000 DWT.

From 1991 to 1995, the company's operations were disturbed by the Croatian War of Independence. During the war, the Croatian ship registry was not recognized, and for a time, Atlantska Plovidba registered its ships with the Maltese Registry. At the conclusion of the war, Atlantska Plovidba, was second only to a state-owned company in registering its ships under the Croatian flag.

By 2001, the fleet had a capacity of 779,378 DWT and the company started to diversify its operations into other industries. Early on, it ventured into shipping agency and travel agency, and later into hotels and airlines. The company owns three hotels, the Hilton Imperial, Hotel Lapad, and Grand Hotel on the island of Lopud. In 2005, the company founded a charter airline company.

The company prides itself on its contribution to maritime education in Croatia. It helped finance and open three institutions of higher learning, the Dubrovnik Maritime Nautical College in 1959, the Dubrovnik Maritime Engineer College in 1964, and Dubrovnik Maritime University in 1986.

In 2004, company received City of Dubrovnik Award by Dubrovnik City Council.

The Dubrovnik shipowner reported on Thursday, 7 September 2023, about the sale of the ship AP Libertas with a carrying capacity of 75,200 DWT, which was in the fleet of this company since 2018. The ship was sold for US$12.35 million, and the buyer's name was not disclosed.

During 2023 the company acquired two new ships, AP Dubrovnik launched on 18 August and AP Lovrijenac launched on 11 October. Both ships are 82,000 DWT bulk carriers built in China. The contract for building was signed in September 2021, with option of two more ships. AP Lovrijenac was sold shortly after launch for 37.62 million dollars.

During November 2023, Tankerska plovidba published that controls 39% of share in Atlantska plovidba and on 10 January 2024 Croatian financial services supervisory agency (HANFA) approved announcement of the takeover bid. By 20 February 2024 Tankerska plovidba reached a 64% stake.

== Fleet ==
Atlantska plovidba manages a fleet of 12 bulk carriers of which 4 are panamax, 4 supramax and 2 handymax and one kamsarmax.

Ship	Built	Type	DWT	LOA(m)	Beam(m)	Draught(m)	Flag	Ref
MV AP Dubrovnik	2023	bulk carrier	82,250	229.00	32.26	20.35	Malta	
MV Miho Pracat	2008	bulk carrier	80,300	229.00	32.26	14.58	Croatia	
MV Zagreb	2008	bulk carrier	80,300	229.00	32.26	14.58	Croatia	
MV Argosy	2012	bulk carrier	79,300	229.00	32.26	14.62	Malta	
MV AP Jadran	2012	bulk carrier	79,300	229.00	32.26	14.62	Malta	
MV AP Drzic	2009	bulk carrier	53,700	190.00	32.26	12.62	Marshall Islands	
MV AP Sveti Vlaho	2009	bulk carrier	53,700	190.00	32.26	12.62	Marshall Islands	
MV AP Astarea	2012	bulk carrier	57,300	190.00	32.26	13.00	Marshall Islands	
MV AP Slano	2012	bulk carrier	57,300	190.00	32.26	13.00	Marshall Islands	
MV AP Dubrava	2015	bulk carrier	38,000	179.95	32.00	10.50	Marshall Islands	
MV AP Revelin	2016	bulk carrier	38,000	179.95	32.00	10.50	Croatia	

== See also ==
- Dubrovnik Airline
