= Eitzen Group =

Former shipping company in Oslo, Norway

Eitzen Holding AS
- Company type: Private
- Industry: Shipping; Private equity
- Founded: 1883
- Defunct: 2012
- Headquarters: Oslo, Norway
- Area served: Global
- Parent: Eitzen family
- Website: www.eitzen-group.com

Eitzen Group was a shipping and investment corporation based in Oslo, Norway. The parent company was Eitzen Holding AS, which was entirely owned by the Eitzen family, which also owns Eitzen Invest and 53.7% of Camillo Eitzen & Co. The investment company owned a portfolio of real estate and other investments, including Hydranor and a major share of Norse Energy, as well as interests in the fishing industry.

== History ==
The company was founded in 1883 as Camillo Eitzen by shipmaster Camillo Eitzen. In 1894, Captain Henri F. Tschudi became a partner, and the company changed its name to Camillo Eitzen & Co. The company bought its first steam ship a year later S/S UTO. In 1936, the company changed its name to Tschudi & Eitzen. It entered the ore-bulk-oil carrier segment in 1967. In 1990 the company bought the Danish company Skou International and entering the bulk segment. In 1997 it bought EAC Shipping and in 2001 KIL Shipping and with it entered the tanker sector. In 2004 the company changed name to Camillo Eitzen & Co and listed on the Oslo Stock Exchange when Tschudi & Eitzen merged and the separate company Eitzen Holding owned by the Eitzen family became established. The same year Navale Française was purchased along with Bergesen's Igloo gas fleet. In 2006 both Eitzen Chemical and Eitzen Maritime Services were created and listed on the Oslo Stock Exchange.

== Demise ==
In 2011, Axel C. Eitzen stated that Eitzen Holding had been heavily indebted, and that he left the company and its assets to the banks. The company among others faced a 700 million kr debt to the bank Nordea, and was liquidated in 2012.
