= Waterfront Shipping =

Norwegian shipping company

Waterfront Shipping AS
- Type: Public
- Industry: Shipping
- Founded: 1988
- Headquarters: Oslo, Norway
- Area served: Global
- Key people: Lars Erling Krogh (CEO); Åge Korsvold (Chairman)
- Revenue: NOK 57 million (2006)
- Operating income: NOK 9 million (2006)
- Net income: NOK 10 million (2006)
- Parent: Kistefos
- Website: waterfront.no

Waterfront Shipping is a shipping company that operates six clean product tankers each at about 84,000 deadweight tonnes. The company is based in Oslo, Norway and is a subsidiary of Kistefos. Commercial management is performed by Dampskibsselskabet TORM of Denmark while Tesma Denmark performs technical management.

== History ==
The company was founded in 1988 as Wind Product Tankers, later changing name to Gyda Shipping and Tschudi & Eitzen Shipping until it took the present name in 1997 when it also was listed on the Oslo Stock Exchange. In 2000 the company was delisted and converted from an ASA to an AS and became a subsidiary of Kistefos.
