= Axel Camillo Eitzen (1851–1937) =

Axel Camillo Eitzen (30 January 1851 – 1937) was a Norwegian ship-owner.

He was born in Drøbak as a son of postmaster Johan Laur. Eitzen and Cecilia Catharina Cappelen. In 1879 he married ship-owner's daughter Caroline Johanne Hansen.

He finished school in Sarpsborg and started a career at sea in 1867. He became a shipmaster and worked as such until 1890. From then he was a full-time ship-owner and shipbroker. In 1883 he had founded the company Camillo Eitzen, which grew to a major corporation.

He was a board member of Kristiania Port Authority from 1905 to 1911, and of the Nordisk Defence Club. He died in 1937. His son Axel Camillo Eitzen became co-owner in the family company, which was later renamed Tschudi & Eitzen, and another son Johan emigrated to Uruguay to pursue enterprises there. He was the Norwegian General Consul in Montevideo Uruguay. He married Maria Magdalena Ramayon and had a son Johan and twin girls Elsa and Maria Magdalena (Maggie) Eitzen. Elsa Eitzen married and divorced Carlos Deus and had a girl named Maria Cristina Deus Eitzen. Elsa remarried Dirk van der Kaay and had a girl named Solveig van der Kaay Eitzen. Maria Cristina Deus Eitzen married Daniel Torres=Negriera and had a daughter named Natalia Torres-Negreira. Natalia Torres-Negreira Deus had a son Francisco Torres Brown and both live in Australia. Solveig van der Kaay Eitzen married and divorced J. Direnzo and had a son named Giancarlo Direnzo van der Kaay and a daughter named Cassandra Direnzo van der Kaay. Giancarlo Direnzo married Heather......and had a son named Dominic and a daughter named Emma Direnzo. Solveig and her family live in Chicago USA, Maria Cristina Deus Eitzen and her husband Daniel returned from Australia (where they lived for 30 years) and are in 2020 living in Montevideo Urguguay. Maria Cristinas's grandparents'home in Montevideo is still standing as is now considered of National Interest and the address is Cavia 3024 Montevideo Uruguay.
