= Delmas (shipping company) =

DELMAS
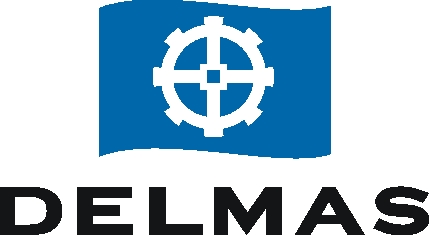
- Industry: Transport
- Founded: 1867 in La Rochelle, France
- Defunct: March 1, 2016
- Fate: Acquired by CMA CGM
- Successor: CMA CGM
- Headquarters: Le Havre, France
- Area served: Worldwide
- Products: Shipping; Cargo; Freight distribution
- Website: http://www.delmas.com/

Delmas Shipping was a containerized-freight and ro-ro shipping company based in Le Havre, France, mainly carrying trade between western Europe and Africa. Delmas was bought by CMA CGM from the Bolloré Group for €470 million in 2005, and fully integrated into its parent in March 2016.

The company operated a fleet of 49 vessels with a collective capacity of 63,000 twenty-foot equivalent units (TEU), on 15 routes between Europe, Africa and the Indian Ocean.

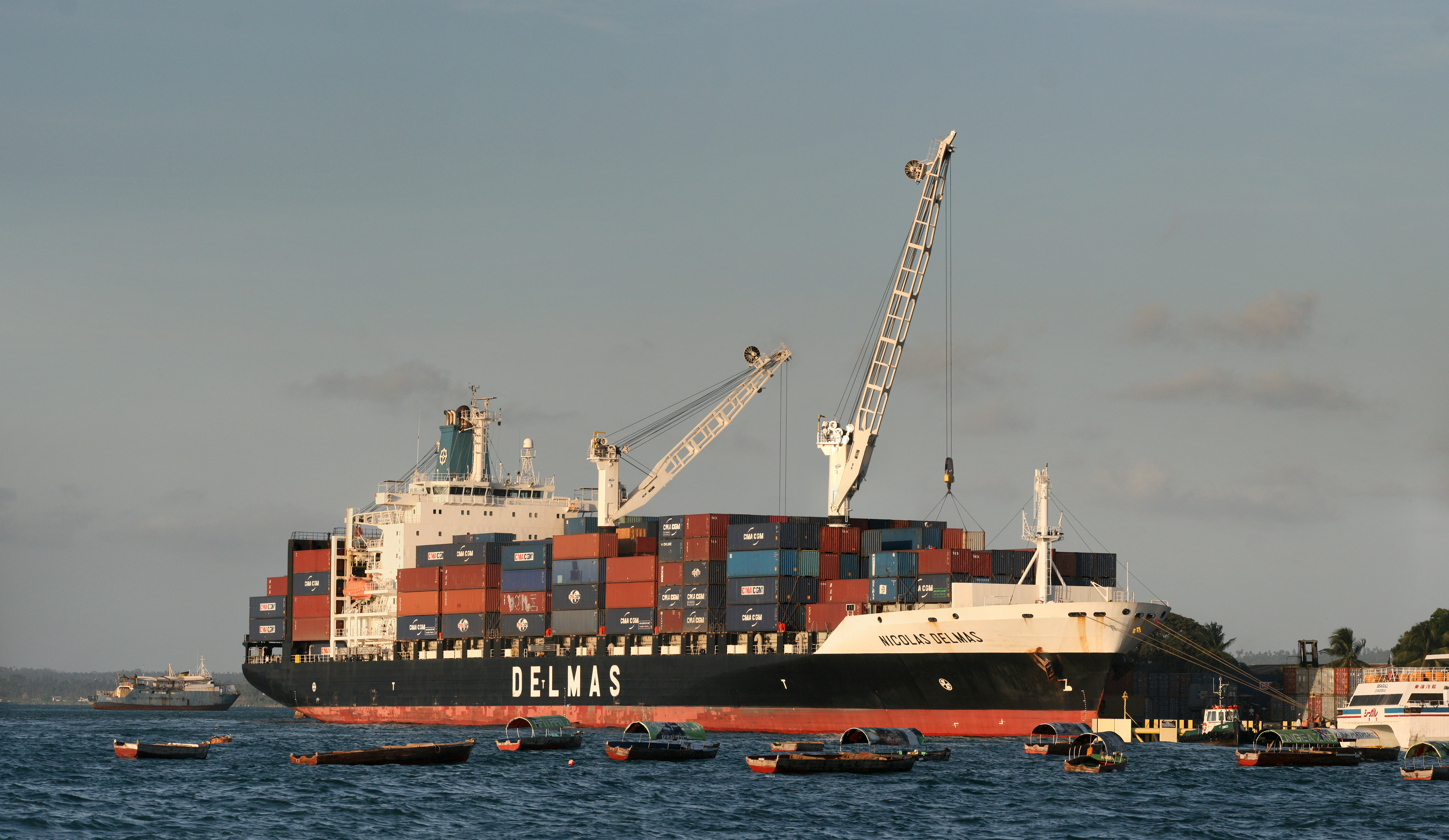
A Delmas container ship unloading at the Zanzibar port in Tanzania

== History ==
Delmas Freres was founded by Julien & Frank Delmas in 1867 to transport coal and raw materials from the French port of La Rochelle. In 1910, the company was renamed Delmas Vieljeux after its president, joint owner and Mayor of La Rochelle, Léonce Vieljeux.

The first Delmas shipyard opened in 1922 and international shipping began in 1925 with imports of mahogany from the African state of Gabon for use in boxes for storage of butter and cheese. After World War II the company relocated to Le Havre and began to specialise in Africa-European trade. It was acquired by the Bolloré Group in a hostile takeover in 1996, but a series of restructures led to a loss of market share and the sacking of 140 staff.

In September 2005, the company was sold to CMA CGM for €470 million. The sale was supported by the Delmas workforce after CMA CGM agreed to a package including no forced redundancies and the retention of the Le Havre offices and Delmas branding. However, the CMA CGM group announced in March 2016 that it will integrate the Delmas brand with its own in order to streamline service and unify all of its maritime activities to and from Africa under a single brand.

In February 2010, Delmas was put in the spotlight for its involvement in the shipment of illegally logged rainforest wood from Madagascar.

== Vessels ==
- MV Cristina A

== Logo ==
In 1871, Émile Delmas, the eldest brother of the Delmas family, left Alsace (which had been annexed to Germany) and joined his brothers in La Rochelle. In memory of the province he had been forced to leave to remain French, he proposed a mill wheel as the company's emblem. This eight-bladed millstone appears on the coat of arms of Mulhouse, the city of mills.

House flag until the 1910, when the company was called Delmas Freres.

House flag until the 1910, when the company was called Delmas Freres.

House flag used since 1910, when a company changes its name to Delmas Vieljeux.

House flag used since 1979, by the Delmas-Vieljeux-Chargers company, run together with the Chargeurs company.

Current flag.
