= Pacific International Lines =

Singaporean shipping company

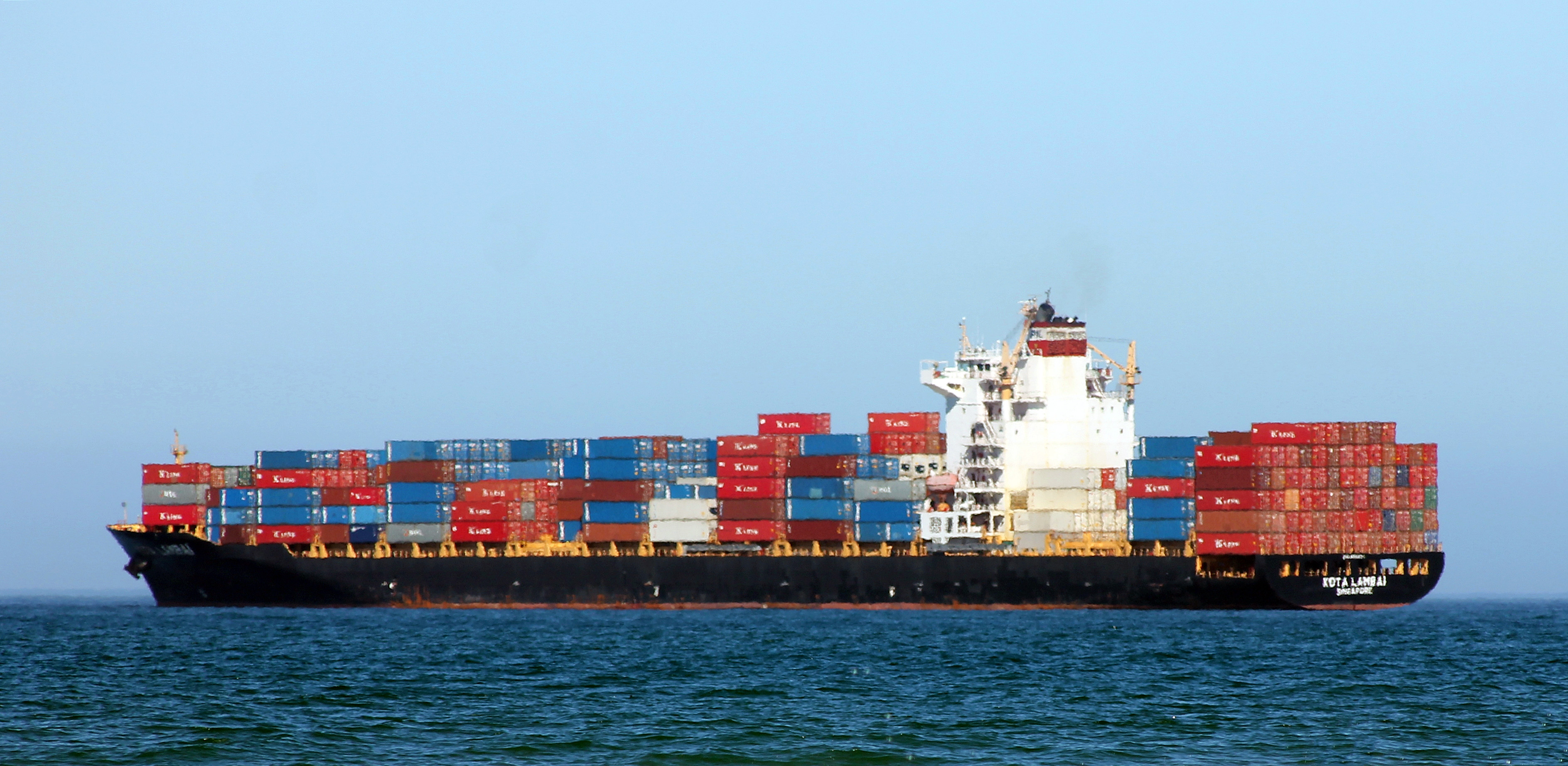
- The container ship Kota Lambai, one of Pacific International Lines' ships
- Type: Private
- Industry: Container shipping; Marine transportation
- Founded: March 16, 1967; 59 years ago
- Founder: Chang Yun Chung
- Headquarters: Singapore
- Number of locations: 500 locations
- Area served: Worldwide
- Key people: Teo Siong Seng (Executive Chairman); Lars Kastrup (Chief Executive Officer)
- Number of employees: 6900
- Subsidiaries: Mariana Express Lines (MELL); Malaysia Shipping Corporation (MSCorp); PIL Logistics; Singamas Container Holdings Limited (Singamas)
- Website: pilship.com

Pacific International Lines (PIL) is a Singaporean shipping company incorporated in Singapore on 16 March 1967. It was founded by Singaporean entrepreneur Chang Yun Chung, who was the world's oldest billionaire until he died at 102 in September 2020.

== History ==
When the company was founded in March 1967, the company originally operated just two ships, but constantly expanded to finally celebrate its first 50 years of history in 2017, and ranking within the first 10 largest container shipping lines.

In March 2015, PIL partially took over the ownership of Singapore's Mariana Express Lines (MELL). According to the deal, PIL assumed the majority shareholding. MELL has continued to operate under its own brand and pre-existing business, as agreed internally at the time of the purchase.

In June 2017, PIL and COSCO entered into a mutual chartering agreement, to supply and exchange vessels during shipping demand peak times.

In February 2018, as forerunner in IT improvements, PIL has implemented a blockchain supply platform to share established data with DP World - Port of Singapore via IBM systems.

== Fleet ==
PIL has a fleet of around 101 vessels (container vessels) with a capacity of more than 300,000 twenty-foot equivalent units (TEUs). PIL has also taken delivery of 12 vessels of 11,800 TEU. The company employs over 6900 staff globally, regularly serving about 500 ports in nearly 100 countries worldwide.

Container ship classes of Pacific International Lines
| Ship class | Built | Capacity (TEU) | Ships in class | Notes |
|---|---|---|---|---|
| P-class | 2015 onwards | 11,923 | 4 | |
| O-class | 2024 onwards | 8350 | 4 | |
| E-class | 2023 onwards | 14,000 | 4 | |
| M-class | 2012 onwards | 3560 | 4 | |
| C-class | 2010 onwards | 6606 | 6 | |
| L-class | 2007 onwards | 4253 | 13 | |
| R-class | 1997 onwards | 777 - 943 | 11 | |
| K-class | 2004 | 3081 | 3 | |
| S-class | 2013 onwards | 3889 | 12 | |
| G-class | 2012 | 2754 - 2800 | 4 | |
| TBA | TBA | 13,000 | 5 | |

== See also ==
- List of largest container shipping companies
