= Eitzen Chemical =

International shipping company

Eitzen Chemical AS
- Company type: Allmennaksjeselskap
- Industry: Shipping
- Founded: 2006
- Headquarters: Oslo, Norway
- Area served: Global
- Number of employees: 100 (2007)
- Parent: Team Tankers International
- Website: www.eitzen-chemical.com

Eitzen Chemical was an international shipping company that owned 72 chemical tankers, commercially managed an additional 12, and had 31 newbuildings on order. It was described as one of the three largest chemical tanker operators by number of vessels in the world.

The company was founded in 2006 and listed on the Oslo Stock Exchange, operating as a subsidiary of the Eitzen Group, a Norwegian maritime organization headquartered in Oslo.

In March 2015, following a financial restructuring that converted approximately US$850 million of bank and bond debts, Eitzen Chemical ASA was renamed Team Tankers International Ltd. and relocated its legal domicile to Bermuda.

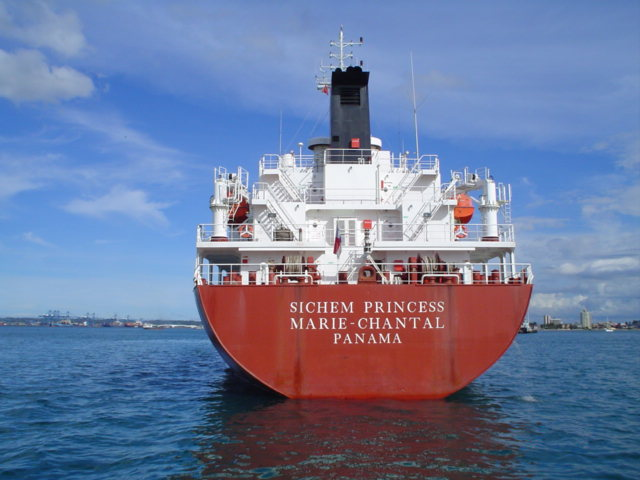
The chemical tanker Sichem Princess Marie-Chantal
