= Eitzen Maritime Services =

EMS Seven Seas
- Company type: Private
- Industry: Shipping, Ship Supply
- Founded: 2006
- Headquarters: Oslo, Norway
- Area served: Global
- Key people: Lars Rosenkrands (CEO)
- Products: Stromme
- Number of employees: 1000
- Website: www.ems-sevenseas.com

Eitzen Maritime Services (Seven Seas) or EMS Seven Seas is a global maritime services group serving merchant marine, offshore and defense customers. The company supplies general ship supplies, provisions, stores, spare parts and leading technical maritime brands through its extensive network of some 600 ports. With branch offices in 17 countries EMS SS is a world leader in ship supply and an important regional player in South West Asia in supply to military customers.

The company was created in 2006 as a merger between TESMA and Strømme. In 2007 EMS acquired the Spanish group Provimar and in 2008 EMS acquired Seven Seas Shipchandler LLC, UAE. In 2014 EMS Seven Seas was acquired by Supreme Group.
