= List of seafood companies =

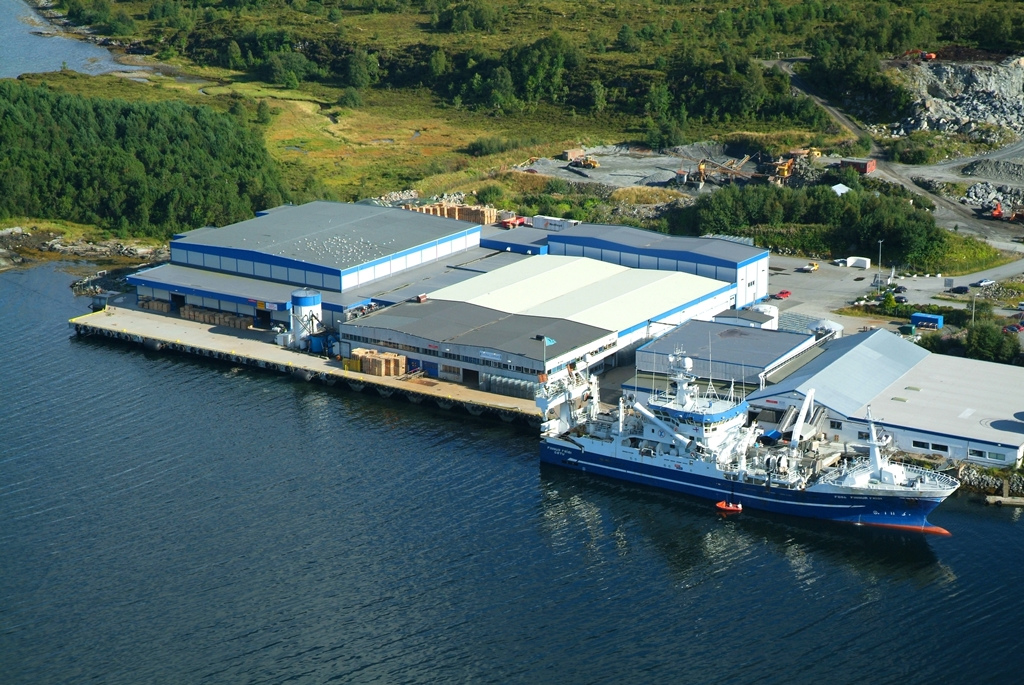
Norway Pelagic's plant

This is a list of seafood companies. Seafood is any form of sea life regarded as food by humans. Seafood prominently includes fish and shellfish. Seafood companies are typically involved with fishing, fish processing, distribution and marketing. Seafood companies also produce feed and nutrition products for farmed fish.

== Seafood companies ==
=== Australia ===
- Clean Seas Seafood
- Huon Aquaculture
- Seafish Tasmania
- Tassal

=== Canada ===
- Clearwater Seafoods
- Clover Leaf Seafoods
- Connors Brothers Limited
- Cooke Inc.
- High Liner Foods

=== Greenland ===
- Royal Greenland

=== Hong Kong ===
- Pacific Andes

=== Norway ===
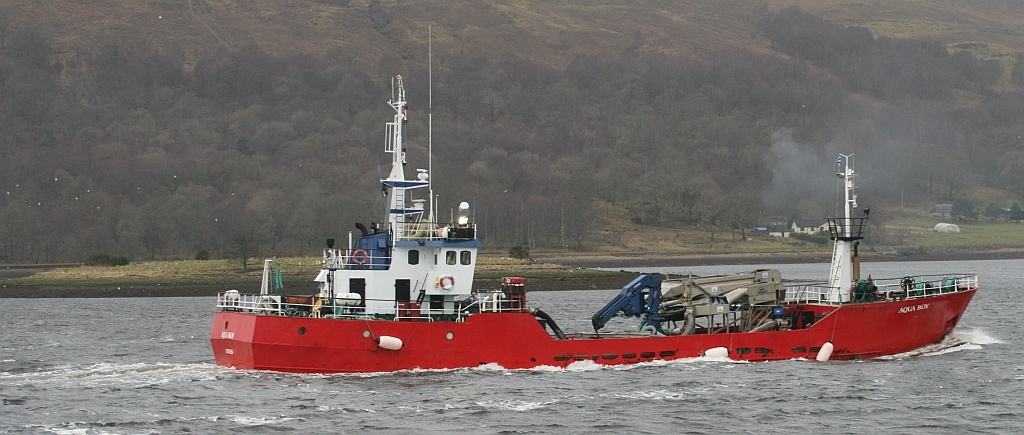
Aqua-Boy, a Norwegian live fish carrier used to service the Marine Harvest fish farms on the West coast of Scotland

- Aker BioMarine
- Domstein
- EWOS
- GC Rieber
- Grieg Seafood
- Havfisk
- Lerøy
- SalMar
- Marine Farms
- Mowi
- Nergård AS
- Norges Sildesalgslag
- Norway Pelagic
- Rauma Group
- Rem Offshore
- Stolt-Nielsen
- Volden Group

=== Sweden ===
- Abba Seafood

=== Thailand ===
- Thai Union Group

=== United Kingdom ===
- John West Foods
- Pescanova
- Ross Group
- Shippam's
- Whitby Seafoods Ltd
- Young's Bluecrest
- Young's Seafood

=== United States ===
American Dynasty (right) and American Triumph (left), two of American Seafoods' factory trawlers docked at Bellingham Cold Storage in Bellingham, Washington

- Adams Oyster Company
- American Seafoods
- Anna Maria Fish Co.
- AquaBounty Technologies
- Bumble Bee Foods
- Handy Seafood
- J.J. McDonnell & Co, Inc.
- Pacific Seafood
- Phillips Foods, Inc. and Seafood Restaurants
- Punta Gorda Fish Co.
- Rappahannock Oyster Co.
- Taylor Shellfish Company
- Trident Seafoods
- Ward Oyster Company
- High Liner Foods
- Gorton's of Gloucester

=== Vietnam ===
- Cuulong Fish

== See also ==
- Commercial fishing
- Fish market
- List of canneries
- List of fish dishes
- List of seafood dishes
- List of seafood restaurants
- List of types of seafood
- Salmon cannery
