= Arne Nore =

Norwegian businessperson (born 1946)

Arne Kåre Nore (born 1946) is a Norwegian businessperson. He was the key architect behind the creation of Pan Fish, and was chief executive officer until 2003, when he was replaced by Atle Eide.
