= 2020 Mi'kmaq lobster dispute =

Lobster fishing dispute

- Date: September 17, 2020 – present
- Location: Digby County and Yarmouth County, Nova Scotia, Canada
- Caused by: Creation of self-regulated Indigenous lobster fishery

The 2020 Mi'kmaq lobster dispute is an ongoing lobster fishing dispute between Sipekne'katik First Nation members of the Mi'kmaq and non-Indigenous lobster fishers mainly in Digby County and Yarmouth County, Nova Scotia. The dispute relates to interpretations of R v Marshall, a 1999 Supreme Court of Canada ruling upholding the Halifax Treaties, empowering Indigenous Canadians the right to fish. Non-Indigenous fishers reacted with violence and intimidation tactics to fishing activities of the Indigenous lobster fishery, citing concerns of potential overfishing.

== History ==
The Halifax Treaties were a collection of 11 written documents produced between 1760 and 1761, which, amongst other agreements provided Native Canadians the right to fish.

In 1999, the treaty was upheld by the Supreme Court in R v Marshall (No. 1) and again affirmed Indigenous fishers the right to fish in order to support a "moderate livelihood". The semantics of the ruling have caused much of the dispute.

In the second decision R v Marshall (No. 2) the Court elaborated the extension of Indigenous treaty rights stating that they are still subject to regulation when conservation is proven to be a concern or other public interests. Both decisions proved highly controversial. The first elicited anger from the non-Indigenous fishing community for giving seemingly complete immunity to Indigenous peoples to fish.

Reaction to the 1999 ruling from Indigenous fishers resulted in fishing occurring outside of regular fishing season. Non-Indigenous fishers in Nova Scotia and New Brunswick reacted negatively to this and retaliated, resulting in the 1999–2002 Burnt Church Crisis.

On September 17, 2020, on the 21st anniversary of the ruling, the Sipekne'katik First Nation launched their own self-regulated fishery, beginning to fish before the start of the official season on November 30, causing concern from non-Indigenous fishers that overfishing could occur.

On November 9, 2020, the Mi'kmaq First Nations, along with other indigenous bands and Premium Brands Holdings Corporation announced that they had acquired Clearwater Seafoods in a $1 billion deal, although they intended to continue with the self-regulated fisheries.

In late November 2020, federal officials seized approximately 600 lobster traps from indigenous fishers.

On March 3, 2021 Bernadette Jordan, Minister of Fisheries, Oceans and the Canadian Coast Guard issued a statement regarding a peaceful path forward due to the disputes.

== Incidents ==
=== 2020 ===
- October 13: A 200-person protest at a lobster pound in Middle West Pubnico resulted in vandalism and lobsters being taken out of the facility. That same day, a protest at a lobster pound in New Edinburgh resulted in the arson of a vehicle. RCMP later arrested 31-year-old Michael Burton Nickerson of Yarmouth in connection to the arson in New Edinburgh.
- October 14: Protests continued at the New Edinburgh lobster pound, resulting in several skirmishes.
- October 16: A man was charged with assault on Sipekneꞌkatik First Nation Chief Michael Sack in relation to the protests at New Edinburgh on October 14.
- October 17: A lobster pound was burned to the ground One man was injured as a result of the fire.
- November 14: A man was charged with assault in relation to the protests at New Edinburgh on October 14.
- November 17: A woman was charged with assault in relation to the protests at New Edinburgh on October 14.
- December 4: A man was charged with assault of a woman in relation to the protests at New Edinburgh on October 14.
- November 30: A member of Sipekne'katik First Nation was charged with unsafe operation of a vessel in relation to a September 20, 2020, incident in the St. Marys Bay.

=== 2021 ===
- January 12: 23 people were charged in connection to the October 13, 2020 incident in which a lobster pound was burnt down.

== Environmental concerns ==
Robert Steneck, a professor of oceanography at University of Maine commented that the potential for overfishing by the Indigenous fishers in the off-season, based on the number of traps they have employed, would be minimal. He was quoted as saying "Really it would be trivial, in my view, by almost any standard".

== Domestic & international sales ==
On October 20, 2020, Eric Louis Thibault, the owner of the lobster pound which was torched, pleaded guilty for failing to report income generated for lobster sales in New Edinburgh. Thibault did not acknowledge the source of the lobster.

In November 2020, crown prosecutors sought fines against Guang Da International, who in August were found guilty of distributing lobster under "communal food, social and ceremonial" licences attributed to the Sipekne'katik First Nation. The lobster were tracked by Fisheries Authorities via microchips in 2017, and found to be transported to Halifax Stanfield International Airport with intention to be sold to the Chinese market.

== Reaction ==
Prime Minister Justin Trudeau called for the end of violence in the region and that the RCMP should adequately protect both sides of the dispute.

Restaurants and fish markets began to participate in a boycott of Nova Scotian lobster in solidarity with the First Nations.
