= John Risley =

Canadian businessman

- Born: John Carter Risley; April 26, 1948 (age 78); Halifax, Nova Scotia, Canada
- Occupation: Businessman
- Spouse: Judy MacDonald (divorced)
- Children: 2
- Awards: Order of Canada

John Carter Risley OC (born April 26, 1948) is a Canadian former billionaire businessman who is known for his interests in fisheries, food supplements, and telecommunications. He is the co-founder of Clearwater Seafoods.

In 2026 Risley's majority-owned company, CFFI Ventures sought creditor protection after a number of setbacks including the loss of access to lands in Newfoundland and Labrador for a proposed green hydrogen venture called World Energy GH2. CFFI was acquired by New Tide Capital LP, a wholly owned sybsiduary of HPS Investment Partners, in a credit bid approved through a Vesting Order issued by the Honourable Justice John A. Keith dated September 28, 2026.

== Early life and career ==
Risley was born in Halifax, Nova Scotia, the son of Robert Campbell Risley (1908–1964), the first commanding officer of a military police unit and later an insurance broker, and Patricia Anne Bourke (1920–2014). He never attended university, instead choosing a career in real estate. By 1976 he was struggling through a housing slump and he opened a lobster business in Bedford, Nova Scotia.

== Major holdings ==
=== Clearwater Fine Foods ===
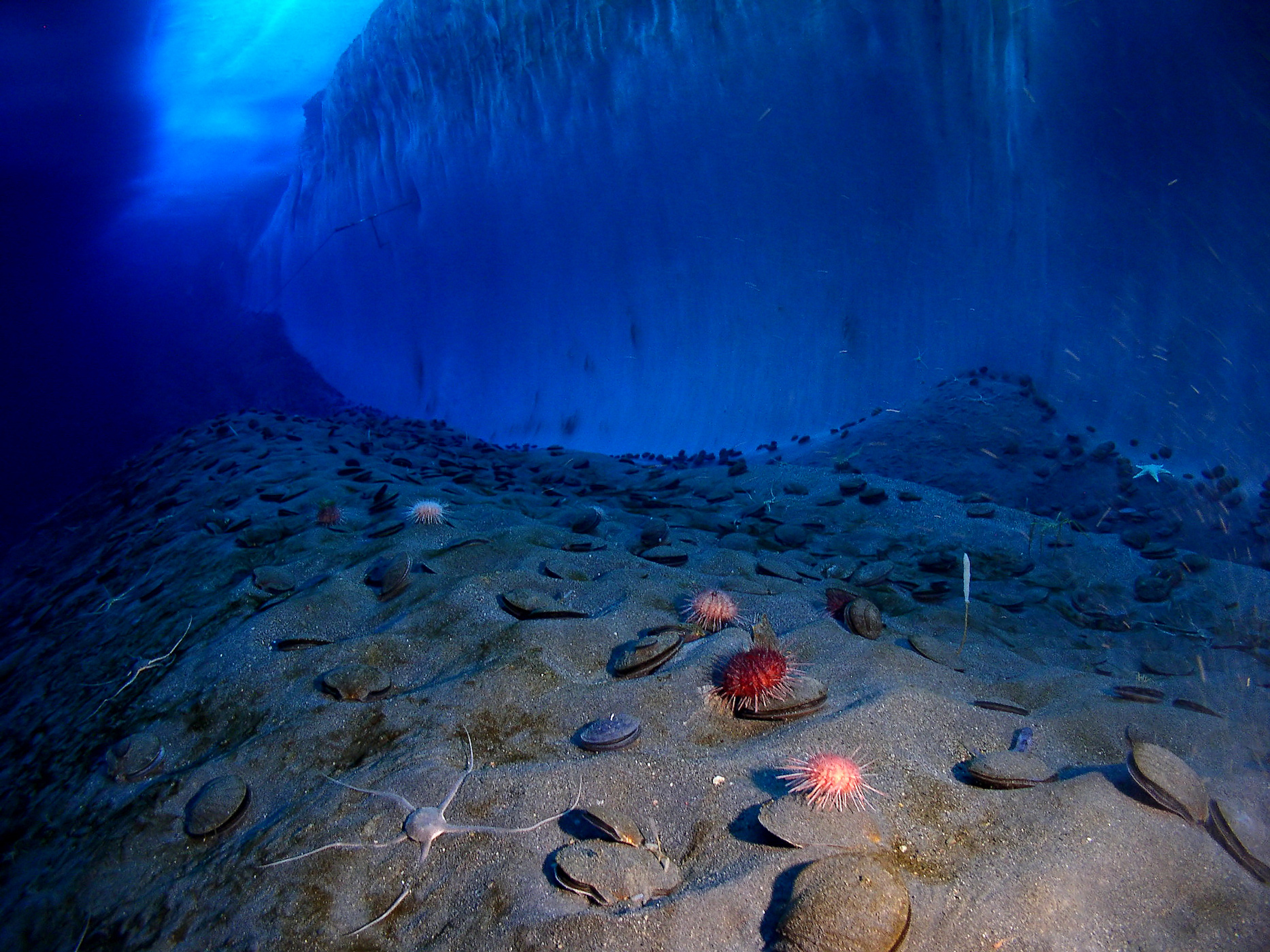
Antarctic scallop at McMurdo Sound

Within ten years of its founding in 1976, Clearwater had grown into one of the largest international food fish businesses by specializing in high return products including scallops, lobster, clams, coldwater shrimp and crab, which it air-freights around the world. It is the largest holder of rights in Canada for each of these shellfish species and by 2008, it owned the rights to all offshore lobster fished in offshore Atlantic Canadian waters and all Arctic surf clams. By 2008, the fleet included ten factory freezers (the largest such fleet in Canada) and the entire international fleet totalled 21 vessels. Its Argentinian fleet fishes Antarctic scallop.

The business became an income trust in 2002 at which time Risley turned the business over to Colin MacDonald. The company has since had a full recovery and has become one of the world largest vertically integrated shellfish harvesters, processors, and distributors. In 2014, they received the Rabobank award for innovation. In 2016 they purchased the largest shellfish producer in the UK, MacDuff Shellfish Group.Clearwater Seafoods Incorporated was sold to Premium Brands Holdings Corporation and a coalition of Mi’kmaq and Miawpukek First Nations led by Membertou in a transaction valued at roughly CDN$1 billion. The transaction closed in January 2021.

=== Ocean Nutrition Canada ===
His company is the major shareholder in Ocean Nutrition Canada, which he founded in 1997 as a manufacturer of fish oil-derived dietary supplements. Headquartered and with R&D offices in Dartmouth, Nova Scotia, it has manufacturing facilities in Mulgrave, Nova Scotia, Arcadia, Wisconsin, and Peru. It is the world's largest producer of omega-3 fatty acids.

In 2010, the company announced the accidental discovery of ONC T18 B, the most prolific strain of oil-producing algae known, which appears capable of producing oil at a rate 60 times greater than other types of algae being used for the generation of biofuels. It has embarked on a four-year R&D program to determine whether the algae is a viable a fossil fuel replacement.

=== Columbus Communications ===
Risley was a major shareholder in Columbus Communications, a privately-owned fibre based telecommunications and technology services provider operating in the Caribbean, Central America and Andean region which he co-founded in 2004. He entered the business with Brendan Paddick from Grand Falls, Newfoundland and was a board member of the company based in Freeport, Bahamas. In March 2015, Columbus was acquired by Cable & Wireless Communications for US$3.02 billion, including the assumption of US$1.17 billion of debt. He was a non-executive director of Cable & Wireless for a brief time.

== Philanthropy ==
Risley provided 25 million CDN in funding to the Ocean Frontier Institute, an ocean research centre based in Dalhousie University. "Risley’s gift to OFI is the culmination of his long-time association with Dalhousie University and its many stakeholders, both internal and external."

== Personal life ==
His ex-wife is the former Judy MacDonald of Halifax. The Risley 32,000-square-foot home near Chester, Nova Scotia overlooks the Atlantic Ocean on a 91 acres (37 ha) property formerly owned by Joseph N. Pew, Jr., founder of Sunoco. After purchasing the property, Risley added another 210 acres to the estate. Besides a mansion, he has a barn with cows purchased from the Rockefeller family and his horses include Dutch Warmbloods, which he shows.

In 2010, their daughter Sarah Risley married Guy Barnett, "a British deckhand who came to Canada to work on Risley's yacht".

His brother is the Halifax restaurateur, caterer and hotelier Robert Risley.

Risley was made an officer of the Order of Canada in 1998.

Since his divorce from Judy Risley (MacDonald), John has built a second home in South End Halifax with his second wife, Amy Gordinier-Regan (Founder of Skinfix) and her two children. They have since separated and the home was sold in 2026.

In 2009, Risley owned a 246-foot megayacht, Northern Star, which had been listed for sale at $170 million.The yacht sold in 2017.
