= Karsten Klepsvik =

Norwegian diplomat (1952–2025)

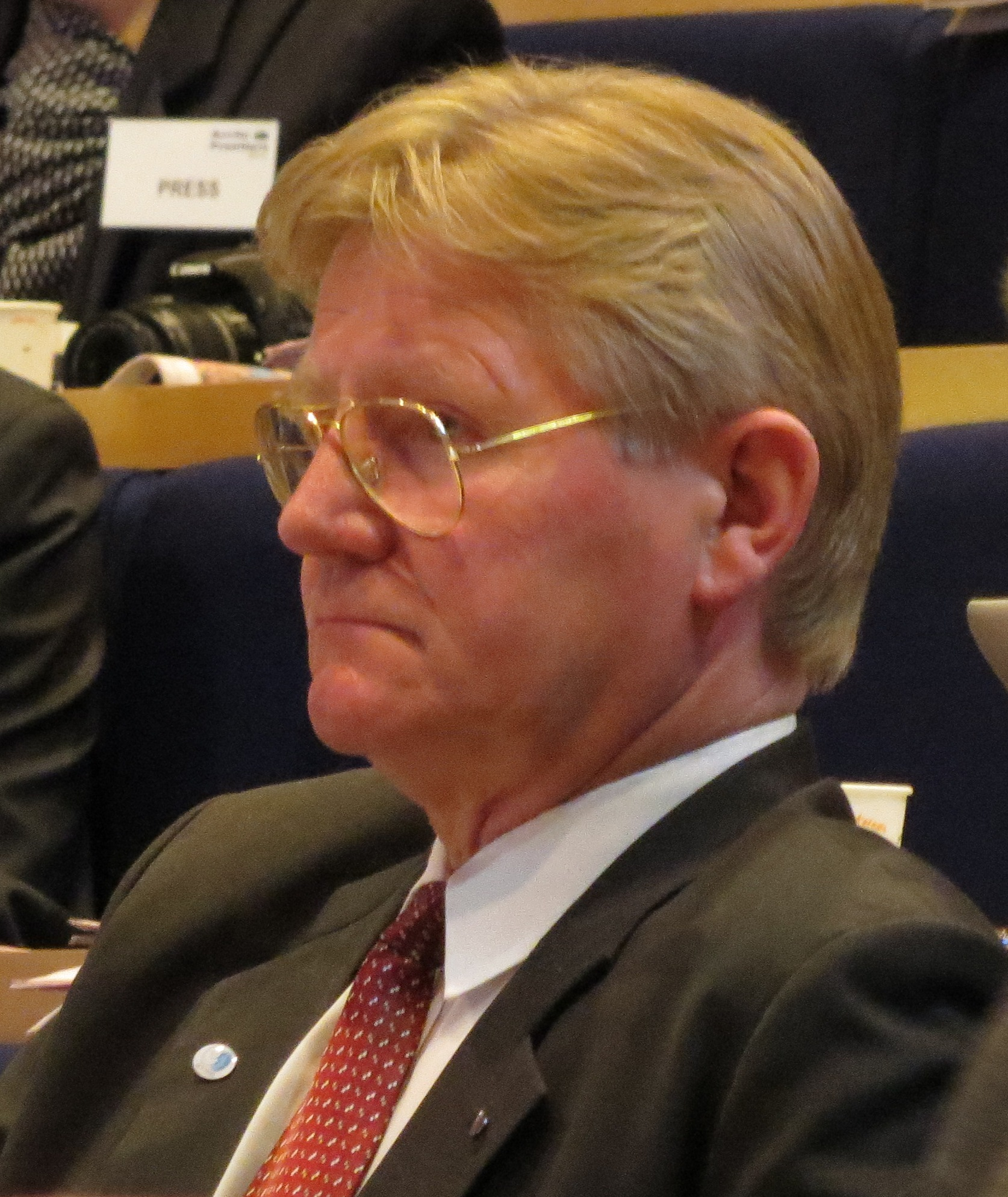
- Born: 4 August 1952; Austevoll Municipality, Norway
- Died: 8 January 2025 (aged 72)
- Occupation: Diplomat

Karsten Klepsvik (4 August 1952 – 8 January 2025) was a Norwegian diplomat.

== Life and career ==
Klepsvik was born in Austevoll Municipality on 4 August 1952. He was educated as cand.polit. from the University of Bergen.

He was appointed director (ekspedisjonssjef) at the Ministry of Fisheries from 1990 to 1992, and was CEO of the Norwegian Seafood Federation from 1992 to 1993.

From 1993 he was assigned with the Ministry of Foreign Affairs (Norway), as director (ekspedisjonssjef) from 1993 to 1995, and as diplomat in Washington, D.C. from 1995 to 1999. He was ambassador to Poland from 2013 to 2017, and ambassador to Lithuania from 2017 to 2020.

Klepsvik died from cancer on 8 January 2025, at the age of 72.
