= 2012 H1 Unlimited season =

The 2012 H1 Unlimited season is the fifty seventh running of the H1 Unlimited series for unlimited hydroplane, jointly sanctioned by APBA, its governing body in North America and UIM, its international body.

The season began in July with the Lucas Oil Indiana Governor's Cup (Madison Regatta), held in Madison, Indiana, United States.

The finale of the season will be in November with the Oryx Cup, held in Doha, Doha Municipality, Qatar. The 2012 Oryx Cup was the 20th running of the UIM World Championship for unlimited hydroplanes.

== Teams and drivers ==
- All boats are powered by Lycoming T55 L7C, originally used in Chinook helicopters, only turbine engine currently permitted in the series.

| No | Team | Owner | Driver | Rounds |
|---|---|---|---|---|
| U-1 | (Washington (state)) Spirit of Qatar | (Washington (state)) Marine Technologies-Erick Ellstrom | (Washington (state)) Dave Villwock | All |
| U-5 | (Indiana) Graham Trucking | (Indiana) Precision Performance Engineering Inc.-Ted Porter | (Maryland) Jimmy Shane | All |
| U-6 | (Indiana) Oh Boy! Oberto- Miss Madison | (Indiana) City of Madison, IN | (Florida) Steve David | All |
| U-9 | (Washington (state)) Jones Racing | (Washington (state)) Jones Racing-Mike & Lori Jones | (Washington (state)) Jon Zimmerman | All |
| U-11 | (Washington (state)) Peters & May | (Washington (state)) Unlimited Racing Group-JW Myers, Scott Raney & Shannon Raney | (Washington (state)) JW Myers | All |
| U-37 | (Washington (state)) Schumacher Racing | (Washington (state)) Schumacher Racing-Billy Schumacher | (Washington (state)) J. Michael Kelly | All |
| U-13 | (Michigan) Tubby's Grilled Submarine Sandwiches | (Michigan) Unlimiteds Detroit-Dave Bartush | (Michigan) Cal Phipps | TBA (DET confirmed) |
| U-17 | (Washington (state)) Miss Red Dot | (Washington (state)) Our Gang Racing, LLC-Nate Brown | (Washington (state)) Kip Brown | All |
| U-18 | (Washington (state)) Bucket List Racing | (Washington (state)) Kelly Stocklin | (Washington (state)) Kelly Stocklin | TBA-New in 2012 |
| U-21 | (Washington (state)) Albert Lee Appliance | (Washington (state)) Go Fast, Turn Left Racing-Greg & Brian O'Farrell | (Washington (state)) Brian Perkins | All |
| U-22 | (Pennsylvania) Great Scott! pres. Matrix System Automotive Finishes | (Pennsylvania) Webster Racing-Mike Webster | (Pennsylvania) Mike Webster | All |
| U-25 | (Washington (state)) Superior Racing | (Washington (state)) Superior Racing-Ken Muscatel | (Washington (state)) Ken Muscatel | All |
| U-57 | (Washington (state)) Formulaboats.com | (Washington (state)) Evans Brothers Racing-Mark & Mitch Evans | (Washington (state)) Mark Evans | All |
| U-88 | (Washington (state)) Degree Men | (Washington (state)) USA Racing-Matt & Debbie Gregory | (Virginia) Scott Liddycoat | All |
| U-100 | (Washington (state)) Leland Unlimited | (Washington (state)) Leland Unlimited-Fred Leland | (Washington (state)) Greg Hopp | All |

== Season schedule and results ==
| Rd. | Race | Location | Venue | Date | Winning boat | Winning driver |
|---|---|---|---|---|---|---|
| 1 | Lucas Oil Indiana Governor's Cup (Madison Regatta) | Madison, Indiana, United States | Ohio River | July 6–8 | Spirit of Qatar | Dave Villwock |
| 2 | APBA Gold Cup | Detroit, Michigan, United States | Detroit River | July 13–15 | Spirit of Qatar | Dave Villwock |
| 3 | Lamb Weston Columbia Cup | Tri-Cities, Washington, United States | Columbia River | July 27–29 | Graham Trucking | Jimmy Shane |
| 4 | Albert Lee Cup at Seafair | Seattle, Washington, United States | Lake Washington | Aug 3–5 | Oh Boy! Oberto - Miss Madison | Steve David |
| 5 | Air Guard Championship | San Diego, California, United States | Mission Bay | Sept 14–16 | Oh Boy! Oberto - Miss Madison | Steve David |
| 6 | Oryx Cup – UIM World Championship | Doha, Doha Municipality, Qatar | Doha Bay, Persian Gulf | Nov 8–10 | Graham Trucking | Jimmy Shane |

== National High Points Standings ==
Team Standings
| Place | Boat | Driver | Points |
|---|---|---|---|
| 1 | Oh Boy! Oberto - Miss Madison | Steve David | 9,377 |
| 2 | Graham Trucking | Jimmy Shane | 8193 |
| 3 | Spirit of Qatar | Dave Villwock | 6845 |
| 4 | Jones Racing | Jon Zimmerman | 6370 |
| 5 | Degree Men | Scott Liddycoat | 5130 |
| 6 | Beacon Plumbing | J. Michael Kelly | 4954 |
| 7 | Miss Peters & May | Myers/Thompson | 4533 |
| 8 | Miss Fox Plumbing | Greg Hopp | 3970 |
| 9 | Miss Red Dot | Brown/Bernard | 3468 |
| 10 | FEDCO/Formula Boats | N. Mark Evans | 3127 |
| 11 | Albert Lee Appliance | Brian Perkins | 1252 |
| 12 | Bucket List Racing | Kelly Stocklin | 690 |
| 13 | Fox Plumbing Too | Ryan Mallow | 582 |
| 14 | Great Scott! | Mike Webster | 510 |
| 15 | Spirit of Detroit | Cal Phipps | 0 |
