= The Gauldrons =

Bay in Argyll, Scotland

Coordinates: 55.418°N 5.757°W

The Gauldrons (Scottish Gaelic: Innean nan Gailleann meaning "Bay of Storms" is a bay facing the Atlantic Ocean in the village of Machrihanish in Argyll, on the west coast of Scotland, a short distance north of the tip of the Mull of Kintyre.

Robert the Bruce, inspired by his spider encounter on nearby Rathlin, crossed to Kintyre, gathered forces and trained his soldiers at a grassy enclave by The Gauldrons.

The views and skies seen from the beach and Lossit Point have been captured by painter William McTaggart, who had a house in the village. One of his paintings, A Westerly Gale, is on display at the Campbeltown Museum and is quoted as being "one of the best loved and most valuable of the fine art works in the museum". The National Galleries of Scotland lists another work by McTaggart called "The Coming of St Columba", painted in The Gauldrons Bay.

Reginald Aubrey Fessenden built a radio transmitting station with a 400-foot (120 m) high mast here in 1905 to transmit Wireless Telegraphy to a similar station at Brant Rock in Massachusetts, United States. An exchange of messages took place on 1 January 1906 but the mast blew down in a gale on 5 December 1906 and was never rebuilt.

Local musicians Eddie Maguire and Davy Robertson of Campbeltown wrote the song 'Bay of Storms'. The song talks about standing at The Gauldrons, watching the approaching storm from the Atlantic Ocean - and speaks of their love of Kintyre Scottish Gaelic: Chinn Tire.

In November 2015, The Scotsman listed Machrihanish and The Gauldrons as one of the top five best Scottish coastal walks, citing "good sandy beaches, cracking views across to Rathlinn island and Ireland and bird-watching galore with Machrianish Sea Bird Centre".

In March 2016, Marine Harvest announced plans to build a facility to produce wrasse on The Gauldrons.
