= Restoule v Canada =

Canadian legal judgment

Restoule v Canada is a legal case in the Ontario Superior Court of Justice that considers whether the Augmentation clause in the 1850 Robinson Treaties entitles the Anishinaabe to an increase in annuity payments.

Justice Patricia Hennessy presided over the case, which featured the Anishinaabe First Nation as plaintiffs and the Attorneys General of Ontario and of Canada as defendants. The case concerns the two Robinson treaties, the Robinson Huron Treaty and the Robinson Superior treaty, focusing specifically on whether the Augmentation Clause within the treaties proscribes a cap on the annuities payable to the First Nation.

The Anishinaabe argued there should be an increase to the annuity, while the Attorneys General of Canada and Ontario argued that there should be a cap on the annuity.

On December 21, 2018, Justice Patricia Hennessy declared that the Crown had a duty to increase the annuities in the Robinson treaties. She determined that the Robinson treaties provide for an increase in the collective annuities and only caps the payment to individuals at $4.

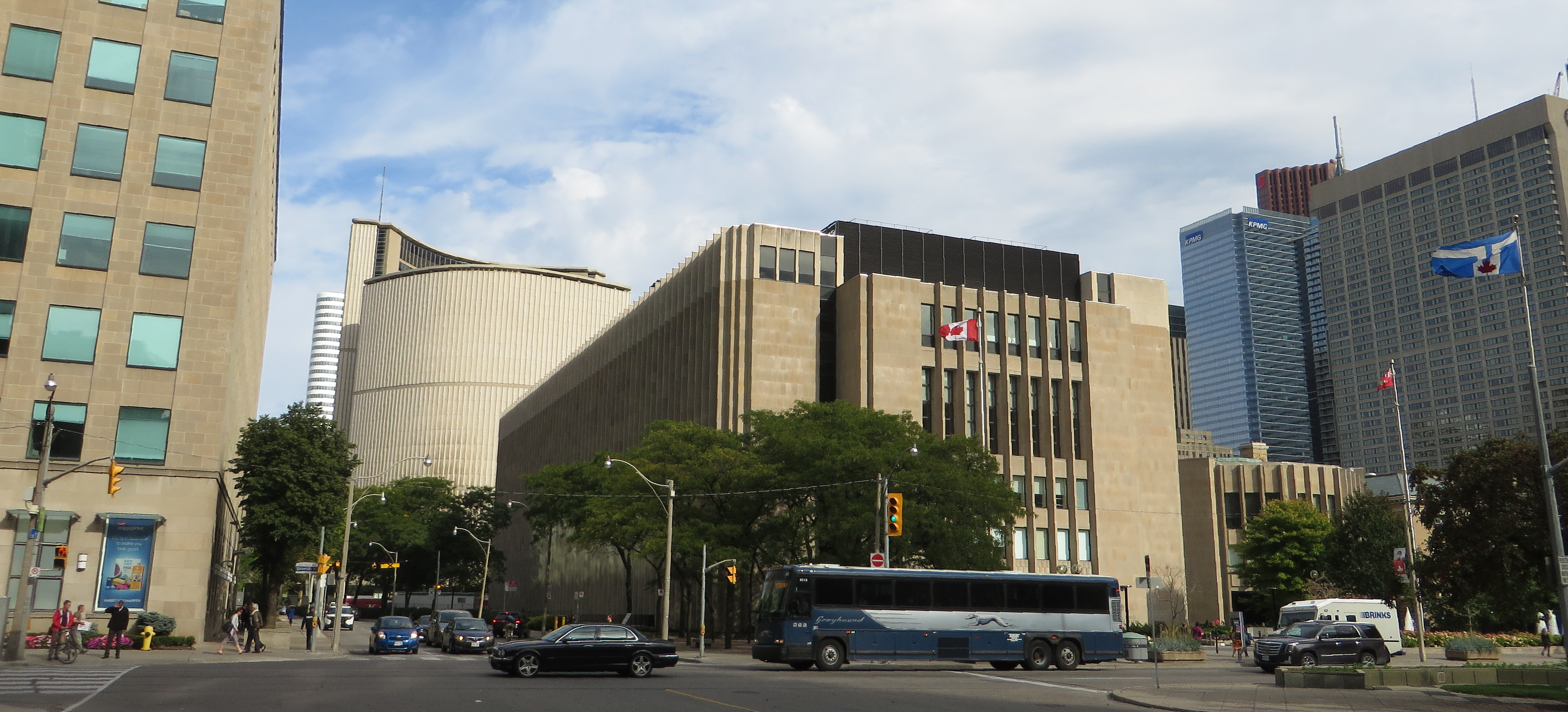
The Ontario Superior Court of Justice next to Toronto City Hall in Toronto, Ontario

The case has been viewed as a step towards reconciliation.

== Background ==
In 1850, 24 first nations entered into two treaties with Mr. William Robinson. Robinson was appointed by the Crown to negotiate a surrender of First Nations' territorial land on the north shore of Lake Superior and the north shore of Lake Huron. Two historic treaties signed in 1850, the Robinson Huron Treaty and the Robinson Superior treaty, form the basis for the decision.

The Robinson Treaties provided an immediate payment of £4,000 to the “Chiefs and their Tribes” in compensation for the surrendered territory of the Anishinaabe and then annuity payments of £600 for the Huron Anishinaabe and £500 for the Superior Anishinaabe. Based on the population at the time, this was $1.70 and $1.60 per capita, respectively. Each Treaty also included a unique Augmentation Clause, differing only in amount of payment.

that for and in consideration of the sum of two thousand pounds of good and lawful money of Upper Canada to them in hand; and for the further perpetual annuity of five hundred pounds, the same to be paid and delivered to the said Chiefs and their Tribes ... The said William Benjamin Robinson, on behalf of Her Majesty, who desires to deal liberally and justly with all Her subjects, further promises and agrees that in case the territory hereby ceded by the parties of the second part shall at any future period produce an amount which will enable the Government of this Province, without incurring loss, to increase the annuity hereby secured to them, then and in that case the same shall be augmented from time to time, provided that the amount paid to each individual shall not exceed the sum of one pound Provincial currency in any one year, or such further sum as Her Majesty may be graciously pleased to order (the “Augmentation Clause”)

== Arguments ==
Restoule v. Canada centered around interpreting two treaties, the Robinson Huron Treaty and the Robinson Superior Treaty, both from 1850. The case was brought to the Ontario Superior Court by the Huron and Superior Anishinaabe. The Huron and Superior Anishinaabe argument stated that the signatory first nations of the treaty are entitled to an increased annuity as the terms of the treaty state that the tribes are entitled to a share of revenues from the surrendered territories adjusted for an increase in revenues on that surrendered territory. The Anishinaabe argued that the Crown has a responsibility to increase annuity payments, as outlined in the Robinson Treaties that the Crown must act in good faith and is required to consult with the tribes in the future regarding the annuity payments. The plaintiffs pointed to the Skene letter to support their arguments, the letter stated that the Anishinaabe are entitled to an increase in annuities above the original $4.00 to $10.00 per person as the revenues for the Crown increased off of the surrendered land.

When the Robinson treaties signed in 1850, the clauses outlined annuities of $4.00 but did not outline a process for increasing the annuities. The Crown's argument deliberated on the amount of annuities owed to the Anishinaabe by the crown as outlined in the Robinson treaties. The Crown's argument stated a cap on annuities. The reasoning was the Anishinaabe leadership failed to articulate their claim that the crown promised to increase annuities from $4.00. The argument stated that the Anishinaabe did not have a sufficient legal understanding to make a claim for an increase.

The Ontario Superior Court of Justice claims that the Anishinaabe at the time of the treaty understood there to be a cap of $4.00 per person. The Ontario Superior Court also argues that the Skene letter and subsequent documentation does not support the Anishinaabe's claim that the Crown is obligated to raise the annuity payments.

== Decision ==
Justice Hennessy found the common intention of the parties on the augmentation clause in the Robinson treaties was that the Crown would increase collective annuities with increases in territorial revenues. The reference to £1 or $4 was only to cap payments to individuals.

The Robinson treaties included an augmentation clause to satisfy the Anishinaabe's expectations and reduce the Crown's financial and administrative burden. The Colborne Policy limited cash payment to individuals, so Robinson likely set a low amount to comply with the Chiefs’ pressure.

The Crown's honour requires the Crown to accomplish the Treaties’ intended purposes. The Crown must reconcile the pre-existing sovereignty of Indigenous peoples with the Crown's assumed sovereignty The Crown has an ad hoc fiduciary duty as “the Crown undertook to act exclusively in the best interest of the Treaties’ beneficiaries in their promise to engage in a process to determine if the economic circumstances warrant an increase to the annuities.” The promise is mandatory, but the Crown has discretion, subject to the duty of loyalty, good faith, and disclosure. There is also a duty to consult.

A fair share of resources was to be determined at a later stage. The treaties included a means to deal with changing circumstances. Justice Hennessy dismissed the claim to imply an indexation term to protect against the erosion of annuities.

== Aftermath ==
The decision by the Ontario Superior Court of Justice on December 21, 2018, to increase annual treaty payment above $4 per person without incurring loss, in accordance with revenue generated on Anishinaabe land, was viewed as a step forward towards reconciliation through a modern interpretation of treaty rights. The Restoule v Canada case serves to emphasize the aspect of the Marshall case where courts needed to develop a modern interpretation of treaties constructed by the Crown and First Nations. Though the consensus was widely accepted, it did come under criticism from some journalists who argued that the interpretation of the treaty was already just and did not need a modern interpretation.
