= Austevoll Seafood =

Seafood company

Austevoll Seafood ASA
- Company type: Allmennaksjeselskap
- Traded as: OSE: AUSS
- Industry: Seafood
- Founded: 1981
- Headquarters: Storebø, Norway
- Website: www.auss.no

Austevoll Seafood ASA is a major Norwegian seafood company.

Austevoll Seafood trades publicly on the Oslo Stock Exchange. The company is a majority owner of Norwegian seafood company Lerøy. The company is a majority owner of Peruvian seafood company Austral. In July 2010, Austevoll Seafood ASA bought Domstein ASA's shares, and became the largest shareholder. In June 2011, a merger between Austevoll Fisk AS and Norway Pelagic AS was completed to effectively integrate Austevoll's pelagic operations for human consumption, into Norway Pelagic, with compensation through a direct share placement. In 2014, after several holding increase activities, Austevoll Seafood and Kvefi AS agreed to merge respective pelagic activities in Europe establishing seafood and feed company Pelagia. Austevoll Seafood has operations in Storebø, the administrative centre and largest village in Austevoll Municipality, Norway. Ole Rasmus Møgster built up Austevoll Seafood (which Ole Rasmus controlled, as a major owner and chairman of the board) with his brother Helge Møgster. They also built DOF ASA (which Helge controlled). In 2008 the brothers were two of the three billionaires who were active in the Norwegian fishing industry. The third billionaire was Kjell Inge Røkke.
