= Ole Rasmus Møgster =

Norwegian businessman

Ole Rasmus Møgster (10 July 1958 – 23 February 2010) was a Norwegian businessperson.

Together with his brother Helge Møgster he built up the companies Austevoll Seafood (which Ole Rasmus controlled, as a major owner and chairman of the board) and DOF ASA (which Helge controlled). In 2008 the brothers were two of the three billionaires who were active in the Norwegian fishing industry. The third billionaire was Kjell Inge Røkke. The Møgster brothers cooperated with Røkke off the Alaska coast between 1987 and 1994.

Møgster was also chairman of Lerøy Seafood Group, but backed out in late 2009 because of illness.

Møgster lived and worked out of Birkeland near Storebø. He died in February 2010.
