= High Liner Foods =

Canadian frozen seafood manufacturer

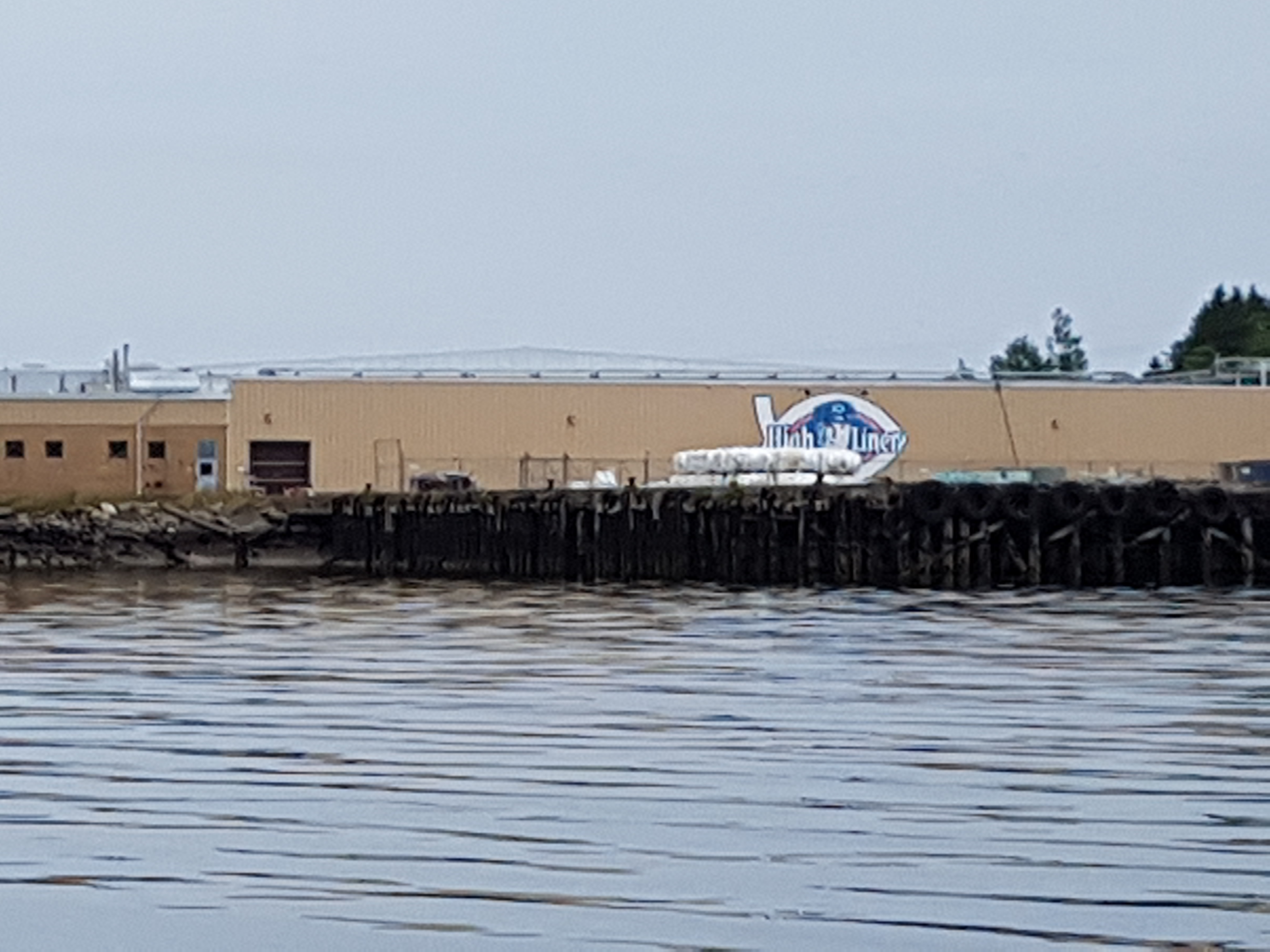
- High Liner Factory in Lunenburg, Nova Scotia
- Type: Public
- Traded as: TSX: HLF
- Founded: Lunenburg, Nova Scotia (1899)
- Headquarters: Lunenburg, Nova Scotia
- Key people: Paul Jewer, President & CEO
- Products: Seafood
- Number of employees: 1,223 (2019)
- Website: highlinerfoods.com

High Liner Foods Inc. is a Canadian processor and marketer of frozen seafood. High Liner Foods' retail branded products are sold throughout the United States, Canada, and Mexico under the High Liner, Fisher Boy, Mirabel, Sea Cuisine and C. Wirthy labels, and are available in most grocery and club stores. The company also sells branded products under the High Liner, Icelandic Seafood, and FPI labels to restaurants and institutions, and is a supplier of frozen seafood products to North American food retailers and food service distributors. High Liner Foods is a publicly traded Canadian company, trading under the symbol HLF on the Toronto Stock Exchange.

== History ==
Founded on December 12, 1899, as W.C. Smith & Company, it was originally a salt fish operation located in Lunenburg, Nova Scotia, which is where the Head Office is still located. It was founded by five brothers, Captain Benjamin Conrad Smith, Captain George Abraham Smith, Captain William Charles Smith, James Leander Smith, and Lewis H. Smith.

In 1926, the same group of shareholders formed Lunenburg Sea Products Limited after diversifying into fresh fish and cold storage. At that time, the "High Liner" brand was conceived.

In 1938, W.C. Smith & Company and Lunenburg Sea Products Limited merged.

In 1945 the merged companies, along with Maritime National Fish Company Limited and other related companies, were merged, creating National Sea Products Limited.

On December 31, 1998, the company changed their name to High Liner Foods Incorporated and National Sea Products Limited became a division of the company.

In May 2003, the company's fish processing quotas and nine trawlers were sold to a consortium headed by Clearwater Seafoods.

In October 2026, Japanese seafood company Umios agreed to acquire High Liner Foods for approximately C$804 million in cash, with completion expected in January 2027.
