= Handy Seafood =

Seafood harvesting, processing, and distribution company

Handy Seafood Inc.
- Company type: Private
- Industry: Fishery
- Founded: 1894; 132 years ago
- Headquarters: Salisbury, Maryland, U.S.
- Products: Seafood
- Website: Official website

Handy Seafood is one of the oldest seafood processing companies in the United States, and one of the largest crab suppliers in the U.S.

== History ==
The company was established in 1894 by John T. Handy. In 1903, Handy Seafood became the first company to commercially process soft shell crabs. Beginning in 1916, the company started farming and selling oysters.

During the 1980s, the company began shipping live soft shell crabs to Tokyo and exporting frozen soft shell crabs throughout Europe and the Pacific Rim. In 1981, the company was purchased by former Perdue Farms executive Terry Conway. His son, Todd, is now the CEO. The company is a founding member of the National Fisheries Institute Crab Council.

In 2012, the company set the Guinness World Record for the "largest crab cake in the world" at the Maryland State Fair, weighing in at over 300 lbs.

The company is headquartered in Salisbury, Maryland and operates 15 plants in the US and abroad, including a primary plant in Crisfield, Maryland.

== Products ==
Products sold by the company include:

- Crab cakes
- Crab cake minis (partnership with Old Bay Seasoning)
- Crab meat
- Gluten-free crab cakes
- Oysters
- Plant-based 'Crabless Cake'
- Salmon bites
- Salmon burgers
- Scallops
- Shrimp bites
- Shrimp burgers
- Shrimp rolls
- Soft shell crabs
