= Ocean Nutrition Canada =

Nutritional supplements manufacturer

- Company type: Subsidiary
- Industry: Food, Dietary Supplements
- Founded: 1997 in Bedford, Nova Scotia
- Headquarters: Dartmouth, Nova Scotia, Canada
- Key people: Martin Jamieson CEO; Jon Getzinger CSMO
- Products: Fish Oil Capsules; Meg-3 Brand Microcapsules
- Number of employees: 3000 (2005)
- Website: www.ocean-nutrition.com

Ocean Nutrition Canada is a manufacturer of Omega-3 eicosapentaenoic acid (EPA) docosahexaenoic acid (DHA) nutritional supplements under the MEG-3 brand.

They are headquartered in Dartmouth, Nova Scotia, Canada.

== Facilities ==
Ocean Nutrition Canada operates four facilities:

- A research and development facility as well as a microencapsulation plant in Dartmouth, Nova Scotia.
- An oil processing and refinement plant in Mulgrave, Nova Scotia.
- An oil processing and refinement plant in Piura, Peru.
- An oil processing and microencapsulation plant at Arcadia, Wisconsin.

The company specializes in the microencapsulation of fish oil, and markets this ingredient as Meg-3.

== History ==
The company began in 1997 with four employees and has grown to over 300 employees worldwide.

On 18 May 2012, Royal DSM from The Netherlands announced that it has entered into a definitive agreement with Clearwater Seafoods and funds managed by Richardson Capital to acquire Ocean Nutrition Canada for a total enterprise value of CAD 540 million. The deal was completed in July.

== See also ==
- Clearwater Seafoods
