= J.J. McDonnell & Co, Inc. =

American seafood distributor

- Type: Private
- Founded: 1945
- Headquarters: Elkridge, Maryland
- Key people: George McManus III, owner and CEO
- Products: Seafood, shellfish
- Number of employees: 200 (2020)
- Website: www.jjmcdonnell.com

J.J. McDonnell & Co, Inc. is a wholesale fresh and frozen seafood distributor on the U.S. East Coast. The company was established in 1945 and originally located in the Baltimore Seafood Market. The company is headquartered in Elkridge, Maryland.

== History ==
The company was established in July 1945 by J.J. McDonnell in Baltimore. In 1984, the company relocated its operations to Jessup, Maryland, and in 2016, the company headquarters was relocated to a 60,000 square foot facility in Elkridge, Maryland. In 1986, the company was purchased by George McManus III.

As of 2020, the company has over 200 employees and a fleet of 30 delivery trucks.

The company is a member of the Restaurant Association of Maryland, Maryland Waterman's Association, Global Seafood Alliance, Better Seafood Board, National Fisheries Institute, Sea Pact, British Retail Consortium, Marine Stewardship Council, Oyster Recovery Partnership, and FishChoice.

The company has business operations and activities in Maryland, Virginia, Washington, D.C., and Pennsylvania, and has national distribution lines. The company is a supplier to Wegmans, Eddie's, Graul's, Seamore's, and various other markets and restaurant chains.
