= Burnt Church Crisis =

1999–2002 dispute in Canada's Maritimes

The Burnt Church Crisis was a conflict in Canada between the Mi'kmaq people of the Burnt Church First Nations (Esgenoôpetitj) and non-Indigenous fisheries in New Brunswick and Nova Scotia between 1999 and 2002.

== Supreme Court ruling ==
As Indigenous people, Mi'kmaq claim the right to catch and sell lobster out of season. Non-Indigenous stakeholders claimed that if that is allowed, lobster stocks, an important regional source of income and jobs, could be depleted.

On September 17, 1999, a Supreme Court of Canada ruling (R. v. Marshall) acknowledged that Treaty of 1752 and the Treaty of 1760-1761 held that a Mi'kmaq man, Donald Marshall, Jr., had the legal right to fish for eels out of season. The Supreme Court emphasized the Indigenous people's right to establish a 'moderate livelihood', in modern-day standards, through trade and the use of resources to obtain trade items.

The Burnt Church First Nation interpreted the judgment as meaning that it could catch lobster out of season and so it began to put out traps. When the Marshall ruling came down in 1999, and the Native people decided to exercise their right to fish for a 'moderate livelihood', the government was not prepared to deal with the rights that were guaranteed in the Court's decision. The government started a program of buying back licenses from non-Native fishermen to give them to Native people.

== Crisis ==
On October 3, 1999, approximately 150 fishing boats arrived at Miramichi Bay to protest against the Mi'kmaq trappers, who were active in the off-season. The non-Indigenous fisherman, in opposition to the Supreme Court’s ruling, damaged thousands of Mi'kmaq lobster traps in the weeks that followed. The destruction of Indigenous-owned traps resulted in verbal confrontations as the protesters docked at shore of the reserve, escalating to intense shouting matches. Local Mi'kmaq retaliated and conflicts ensued in the following nights, with both parties suffering injuries and damaged property. Additionally, a traditional ceremonial arbour was burned to the ground in Burnt Church, in which three Mi'kmaq men were severely injured after their truck was rammed by a non-Indigenous driver.

The Indigenous fishermen refused to resign their fishing rights granted by Treaty and affirmed by the Marshall decision. Mi'kmaq set up an armed encampment on the wharf in Burnt Church to protect Indigenous people continuing to catch lobster in the bay. Fisheries Minister Herb Dhaliwal later met with Indigenous leaders in an attempt to ease tensions. All but two of the thirty-four First Nations bands agreed to a voluntary moratorium on fishing, with the Burnt Church and Indian Brook bands rejecting the possibility of government regulation. In Yarmouth, Nova Scotia, 600 fishermen armed with rifles and shotguns, blockaded the Yarmouth Harbour in an illegal blockade designed to keep Indigenous people off the water by means of intimidation. A lobster boat owned by a non-status Indigenous person was also sunk in Yarmouth.

On October 18, 1999, the West Nova Fishermen's Coalition, an organization in Yarmouth, Nova Scotia, applied for a rehearing of the appeal and asked for the judgement to be set aside until a new hearing. On November 17, 1999, the Supreme Court said there would be no rehearing; however, to alleviate the confusion, the Court released a new ruling, known as Marshall 2, to clarify points made in the original Marshall decision. The federal government ordered the Mi'kmaq to reduce the total number of lobster traps used, which left members of the Burnt Church First Nation with a total of 40 traps for the whole community. Some Mi'kmaq resisted that and claimed that they already have conservation methods in place to ensure the lobster stock would not be depleted off the Atlantic coast.

In 2000 and 2001, rising conflict led to a series of standoffs between the Royal Canadian Mounted Police and First Nations people, and a number of arrests were made. On August 9, 2000, the band members voted to reject federal regulation of the fishery despite the government's offer to provide five well-equipped boats and build a new $2-million wharf. Ottawa wanted to set a 40-trap limit, but the band said it has the right to set more than 5,000 traps. At the time, there were 743 licenses available for that fishing area for 300 traps each, totaling 222,900 traps out each season for commercial fishermen, the majority non-Indigenous. The following week, tensions rose again in Burnt Church as enraged Mi'kmaq declared war against the Department of Fisheries and Oceans (DFO) after a late-night raid on several lobster traps in Miramichi Bay. Four people were arrested, and one boat and over 700 traps were seized. Indigenous fishermen protested by setting up a blockade on Highway 11, a major commercial route in the province. The Mi'kmaq claimed officers pointed guns at them, but the DFO denied the allegations and said that only pepper spray was used and that one baton was pulled out.

When Burnt Church fishermen continued their lobster catch, the federal government said that fisheries officers would continue to seize traps and make arrests. However, it they also called the Indigenous leaders to return to the negotiating table and claimed the Burnt Church band refused to even meet with his federal negotiator. The federal government offered to pay for a $2 million fishing wharf and five new fishing boats for the Mi'kmaq. The Mi'kmaq rejected the offer since they believed that it could be interpreted as a surrender of their legal fishing rights. After the Mi'kmaq refused the offer, the Department of Fisheries and Oceans boats became more aggressive with their attempts to prevent the Indigenous fishers from setting traps on the waters of the Miramichi Bay. The intervention efforts cost over $15 million for the federal government, not including ensuing legal costs.

== Report ==
In April 2002, a federal report on the crisis suggested a number of police charges to be dropped and that fishermen should be compensated for damaged traps and boats. It also recommended, however, that First Nations fishermen should be allowed to fish only in season and that they should obtain fishing licenses like non-Indigenous fishermen.

== Agreement in Principle ==
The crisis concluded when an Agreement in Principle was signed with the Burnt Church community that allowed it the right to fish for subsistence purposes but denied it the right to catch and sell the lobster.

== Documentary film ==
The Burnt Church Crisis was the subject of a 2002 documentary film by Alanis Obomsawin, Is the Crown at War With Us?

== See also ==
- Oka Crisis, land dispute between a group of Mohawk people and the town of Oka, Quebec, in 1990
- Ipperwash Crisis, land dispute in Ipperwash Provincial Park, Ontario, in 1995
- Gustafsen Lake Standoff, confrontation between police and Ts'peten Defenders in British Columbia in 1995
- Caledonia Land Dispute, a demonstration to raise awareness about First Nation land claims in Ontario, beginning in 2006
- 2020 Mi'kmaq lobster dispute, dispute on a self-regulated indigenous fishery, similar to the Burnt Church Crisis
