= Åse Aulie Michelet =

Norwegian businesswoman

Åse Aulie Michelet (born 1952) is a Norwegian businessperson and pharmacist. Since 1 March 2008 she has been Chief Executive Officer of Marine Harvest. She is also a member of the board of Orkla.

Michelet was educated in pharmacy at the Swiss Federal Institute of Technology Zürich and the University of Oslo, graduating in 1978. After one-year as a researcher at University of Oslo, she started working for Nycomed in 1979. She became a middle manager in 1984 and an executive in 1990. In 1998 she became director of Amersham Health in Norway, and for production worldwide—a job she continued after the buy-out in 2004, when it became part of GE Healthcare. In 2008 she became Chief Executive Officer of the farmed seafood company Marine Harvest.

She is a fellow of the Norwegian Academy of Technological Sciences.
