= Ole Eirik Lerøy =

Norwegian businessperson (born 1959)

Ole Eirik Lerøy (born 9 December 1959) is a Norwegian businessperson.

He was educated at the Norwegian School of Management 1980-84. AFF management program 1992.

In 1985 he was hired in the company Lerøy; he was their CEO from 1991 to 2008. In 2008 he stepped down and also sold his shares in the company. He has been chairman of the Norwegian Seafood Federation. In January 2010 he became acting chairman of Marine Harvest, as Svein Aaser suddenly stepped down.
