= Cuulong Fish =

Vietnamese seafood company

Cuulong Fish JSC (HOSE: ACL) is a fishery company in Vietnam, specializing in farming and processing two species of pangasius, a genus of catfish, Pangasius bocourti and Pangasius hypophthalmus (the iridescent shark). The company's main facilities are in Long Xuyen City in An Giang Province, adjacent to the Mekong River. Cuulong processes over 80,000 tons of pangasius per year. Products include frozen fillets, breaded fillets, fishsticks, nuggets and fish sausage. Cuulong Fish's stock is listed at the Ho Chi Minh Securities Trading Center.

== See also ==
- Fish farm
- Fish processing
- List of seafood companies
