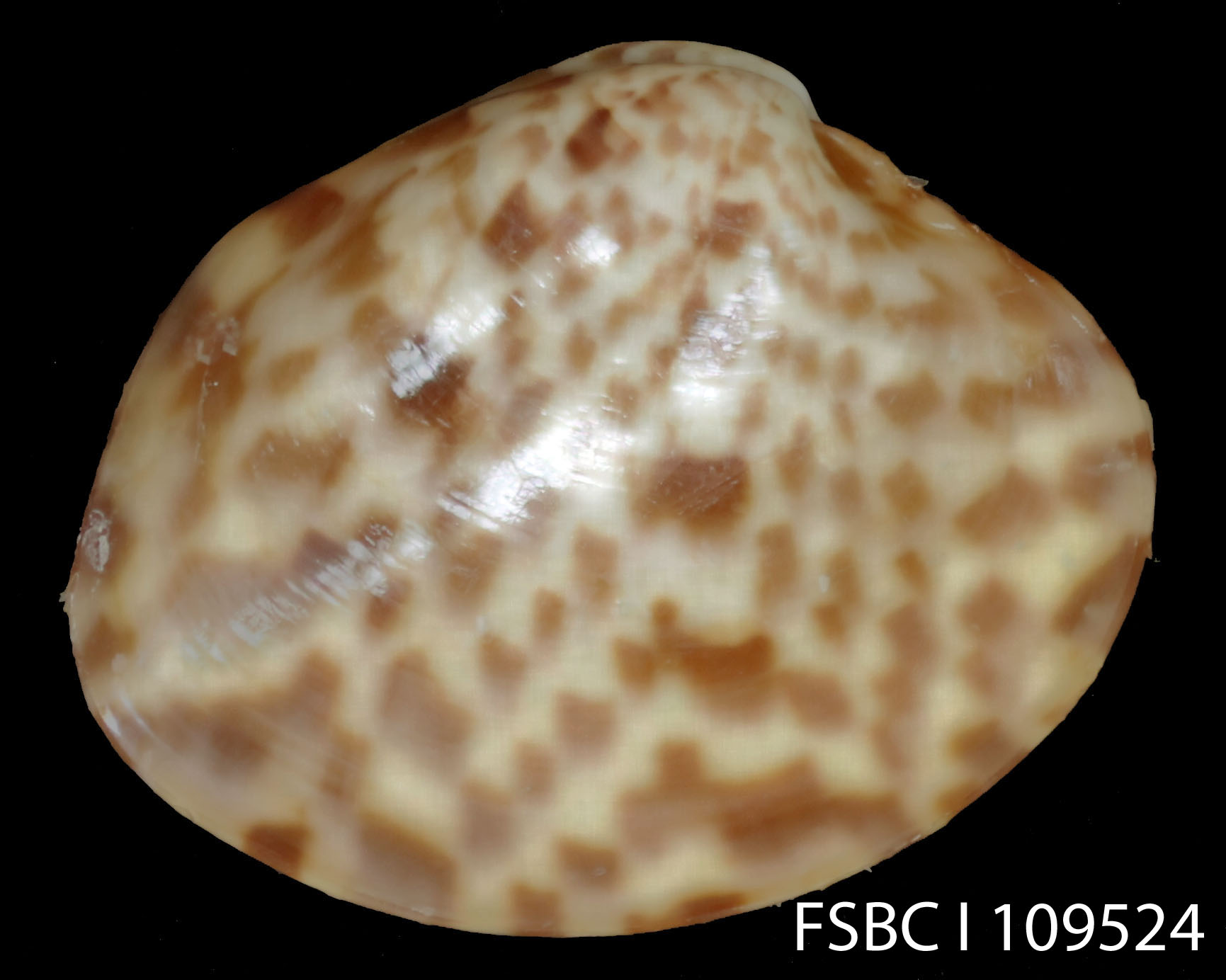

Scientific classification
- Domain: Eukaryota
- Kingdom: Animalia
- Phylum: Mollusca
- Class: Bivalvia
- Order: Venerida
- Superfamily: Veneroidea
- Family: Veneridae
- Genus: Macrocallista; Meek, 1876

Species
- See text.

= Macrocallista =

Genus of bivalves

Macrocallista is a genus of saltwater clams, marine bivalve mollusks in the family Veneridae, the Venus clams.

== Species ==
Species within the genus Macrocallista include:

- Macrocallista maculata (Linnaeus, 1758) – calico clam
- Macrocallista nimbosa (Lightfoot, 1786) – sunray venus clam
