= Norway Pelagic =

Norwegian seafood company

Norway Pelagic ASA
- Type: Limited company
- Industry: Seafood, food processing
- Founded: (2007)
- Headquarters: Ålesund, Norway
- Key people: Arne Møgster (Chairman); Tor Vikenes (CEO)
- Products: Wild caught atlantic herring, atlantic mackerel and capelin, production and distribution
- Revenue: ▲NOK 3,638 mill (2011)
- Net income: ▼NOK 61 mill (2011)
- Total assets: ▲NOK 2,491 mill (2011)
- Total equity: ▲NOK 1,029 mill (2011)
- Number of employees: 415 (2011)
- Parent: Austevoll Seafood
- Website: www.norwaypelagic.no

Norway Pelagic is a producer and exporter of pelagic fish, such as atlantic herring, atlantic mackerel and capelin, caught in the seas close to Norway. Total raw material processed is on annual basis about 50% of total landings of pelagic fish in Norway processed for human consumption. Norway Pelagic ASA is listed on the Oslo Stock Exchange and its head office is in Ålesund, Norway. The company was established in 2007 through a merger and in 2013 became a wholly owned subsidiary of Austevoll Seafood.

== Operations ==
Norway Pelagic has ownership interest in 15 production plants along the Norwegian coast. Fully controlled plants are located at Sommarøy, Lødingen, Bodø, Liavåg, Selje, Måløy (3 plants), Kalvåg, Florø, Austevoll and Karmøy. Partly controlled plants are Modolv Sjøset AS, Træna (66%), Sir Fish AS, Sirevåg (60%) and North Capelin Honningsvåg AS, Honningsvåg (50%). In addition the company owns 25% of the shares of Shetland Catch Ltd, Shetland, UK. The company main operations are production of roundfrosen and fillets of atlantic herring, roundfrosen atlantic mackerel and capelin. Other products are atlantic horse mackerel, atlantic mackerel fillets, and roe from atlantic herring and capelin. Almost entire production is for export and the most important markets are Japan, Russia, Ukraine and Germany.

In 2009, Marine Stewardship Council certification was awarded to Norway Pelagic for its Chain of Custody Standards. The certified fisheries are Norwegian Spring Spawning Herring, the North Sea Herring and the North East Atlantic Mackerel. This certification guarantees that all Norway Pelagic products of these species originate from sustainable fisheries. However, in April 2012, the mackerel certification was suspended due to the quota conflict between Norway/EU and Iceland/Faroe Islands.

== History and main events ==
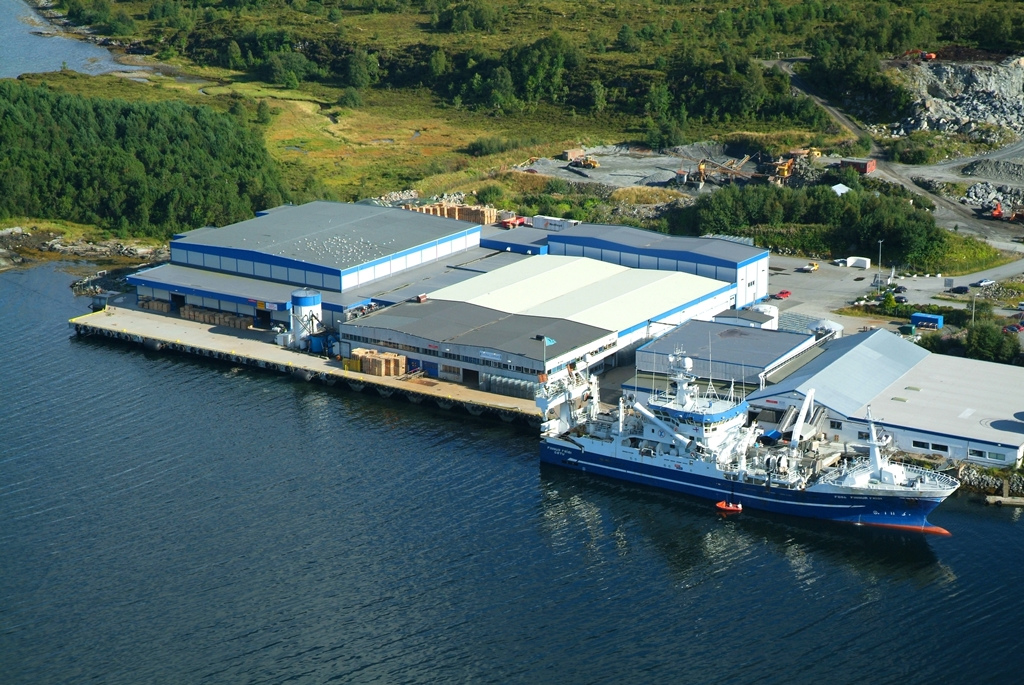
Norway Pelagic's plant in Liavåg

Norway Pelagic ASA was established in 2007, through a merger between Domstein Pelagic, Global Fish, Bergen Fiskeindustri, Koralfisk and Bernt Hansens Eftf. One year later, in June 2008, the company was listed on the Oslo Stock Exchange. In 2009 Norway Pelagic acquired Fryseriet in Lødingen, a producer of herring products and capelin. In 2010, Norway Pelagic also acquired Emy Fish and Brødr Myhre, two plants in Måløy specializing in herring fillet products.

In July 2010, Austevoll Seafood ASA bought Domstein ASA's shares, and became the largest shareholder. In June 2011, a merger between Austevoll Fisk AS and Norway Pelagic AS was completed to effectively integrate Austevoll's pelagic operations for human consumption, into Norway Pelagic, with compensation through a direct share placement.

In August 2011, the company head office was relocated from Vågsøy Municipality to Ålesund Municipality.

In July 2013, Austevoll Seafood bought the remaining shares of Norway Pelagic and the company became a wholly owned subsidiary of Austevoll Seafood.
