= Anna Maria Fish Co. =

Cortez Bottarga is a bottarga producer in Florida's Manatee County. The Company was founded by Seth Cripe, who is also the winemaker and founder of LOLA Wines.

The company is supplied with mullet fish eggs (roe) by commercial fishermen out of Cortez, Florida. Restaurateur Ed Chiles, son of former governor Lawton Chiles, partnered on the business. The roe are cured to make bottarga. Plans are in the works to expand the operation to octopus, sardines, and canned sunray clams. Cortez Bottarga is located at 4430 2nd. Ave. S. in St. Petersburg, FL. The company's bottarga is made using salt-cured and sun-dried striped gray mullet roe.
