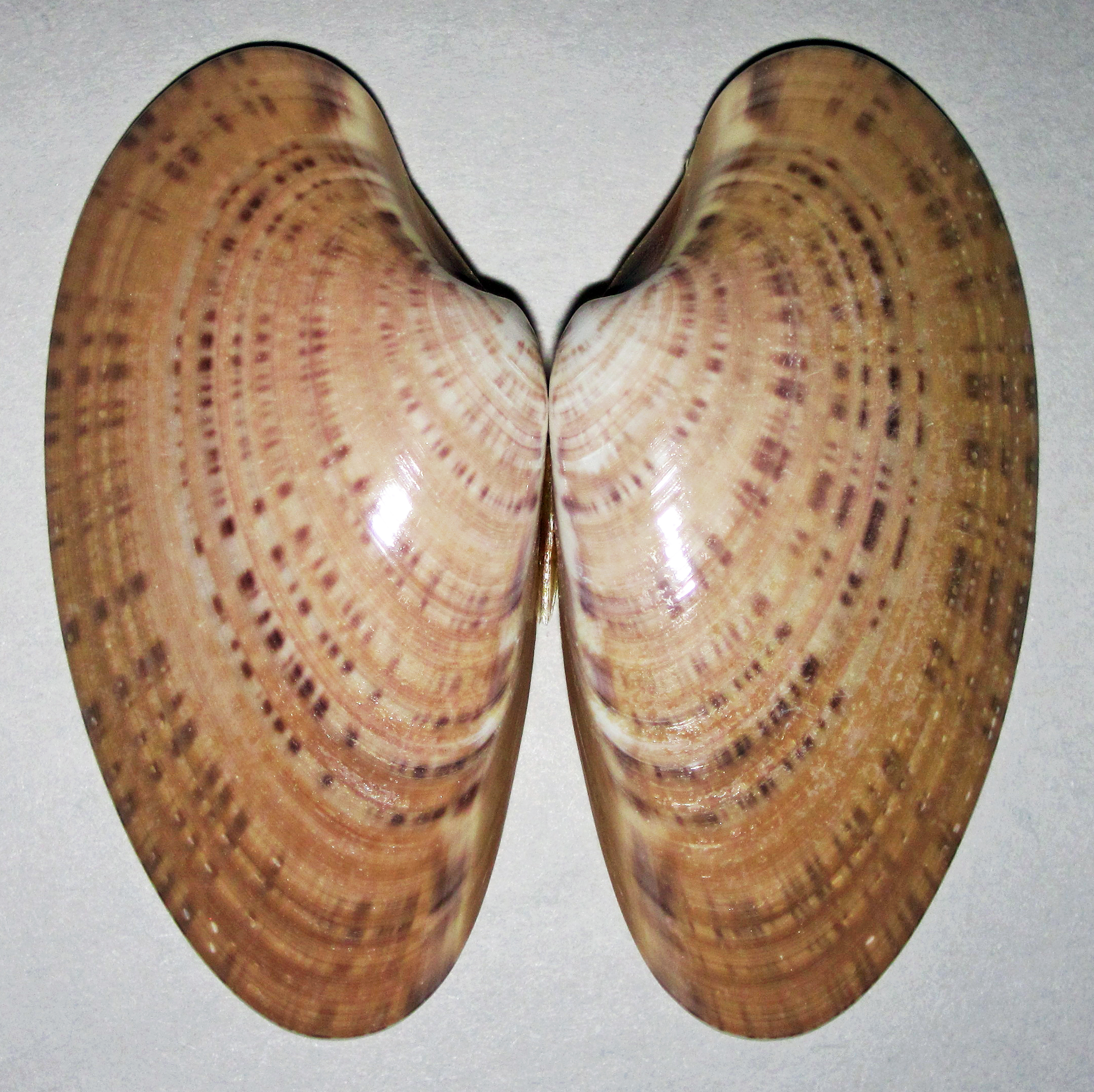

Conservation status
- Secure (NatureServe)

Scientific classification
- Kingdom: Animalia
- Phylum: Mollusca
- Class: Bivalvia
- Order: Venerida
- Superfamily: Veneroidea
- Family: Veneridae
- Genus: Macrocallista
- Species: M. nimbosa

Binomial name
- Macrocallista nimbosa (Lightfoot, 1786)

= Macrocallista nimbosa =

Species of bivalve

Macrocallista nimbosa, or the sunray venus clam, is a species of bivalve mollusc in the family Veneridae.

== Description ==
Adult size ranges from 65 mm. to 95 mm.

Extant specimen

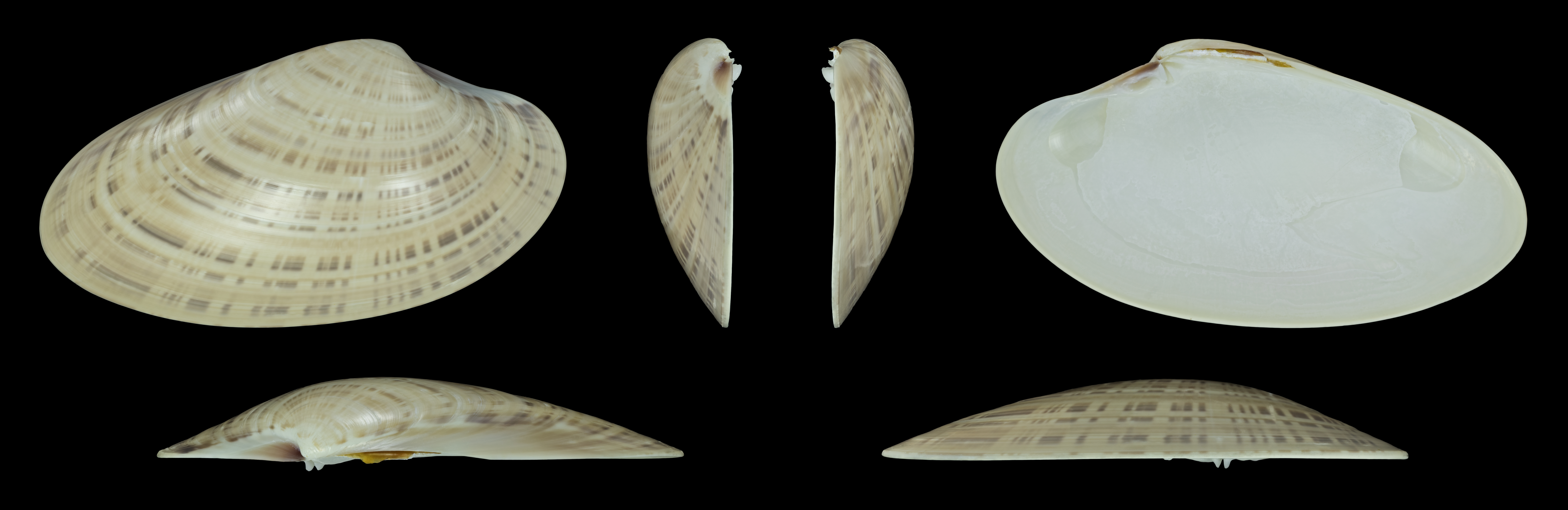
Right valve

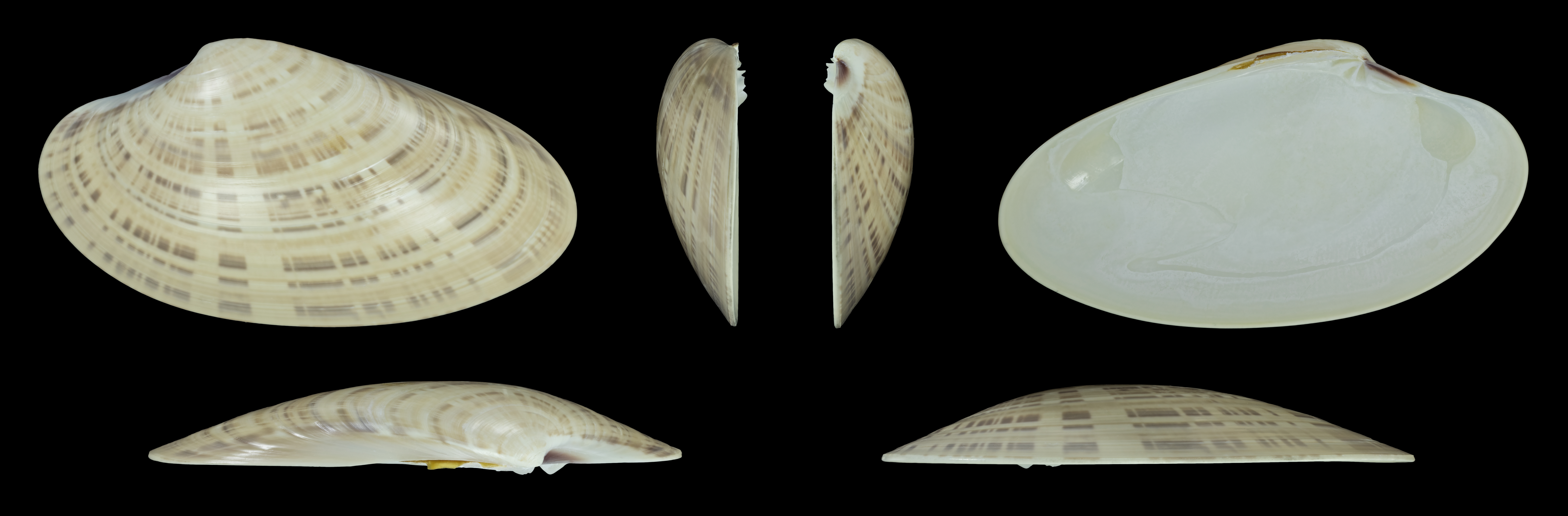
Left valve

Fossil specimen from the Pleistocene

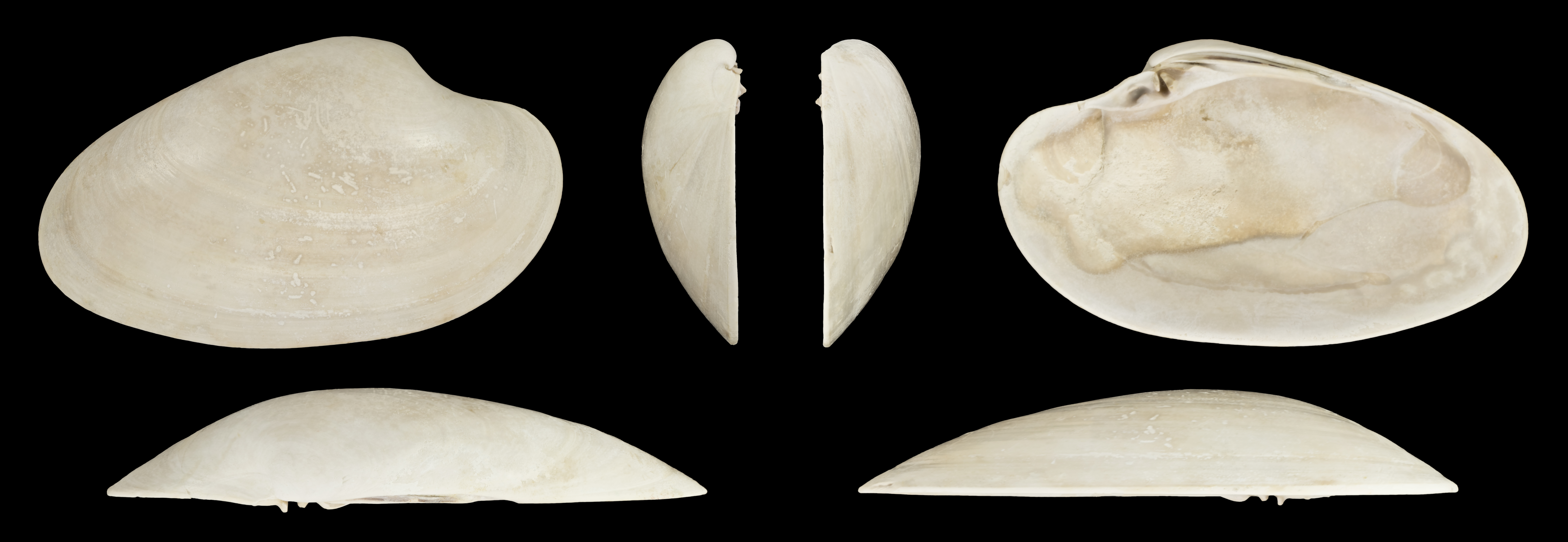
Right valve

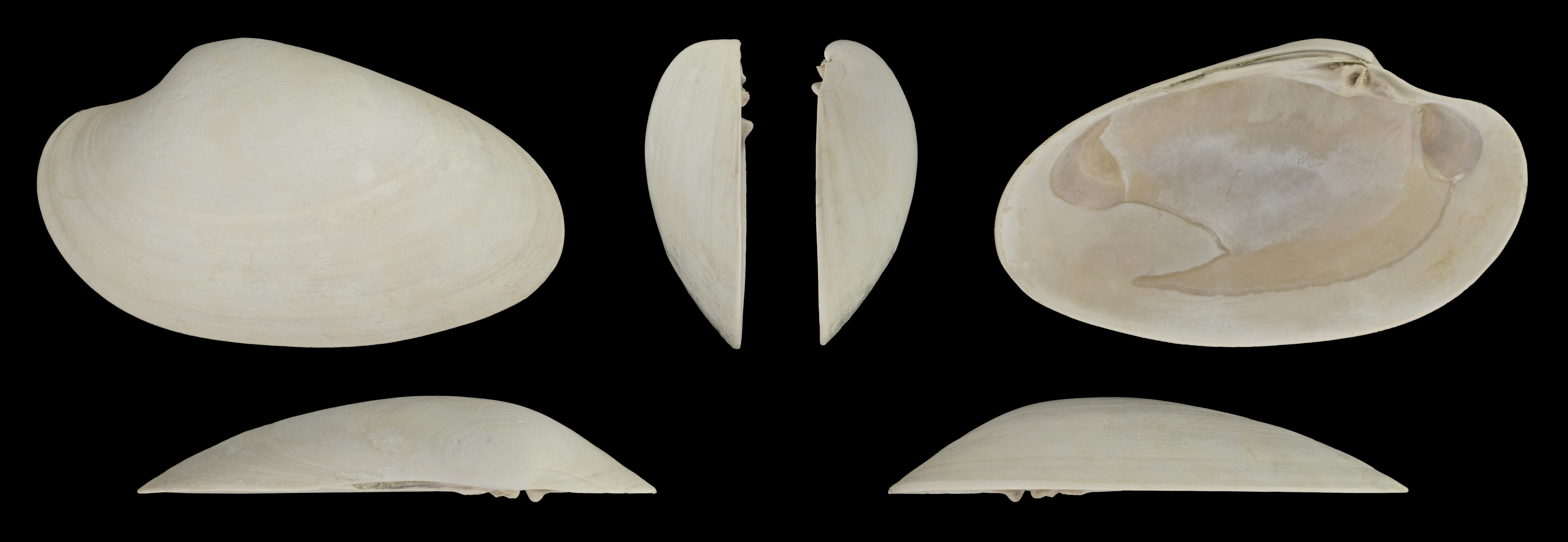
Left valve

== Distribution ==
Atlantic coast of North America, ranging from North Carolina to Texas.
