= Ward Oyster Company =

American oyster farm

Ward Oyster Company is a cage oyster farm headquartered in Gloucester County, Virginia, and one of the largest cage oyster farms on the U.S. East Coast. Established in 1986, the company sells 4 million oysters and tens of millions of oyster larvae each year. The company's oyster nursery is located near the Ware River and its aquaculture farm is situated in Mobjack Bay. The company is also involved in oyster restoration projects in the Chesapeake Bay.
