= Adams Oyster Company =

American oyster farm

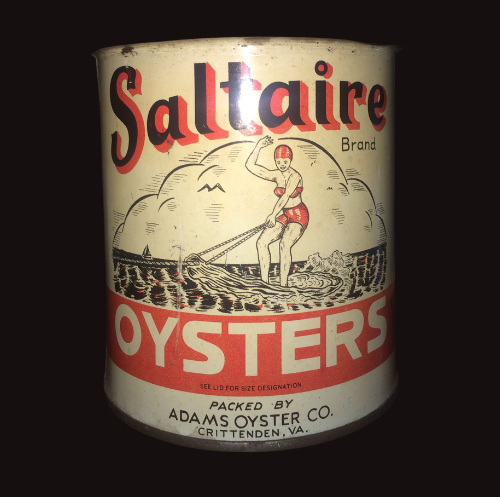
"Saltaire Oyster" can from Adams Oyster Company, c. 1940s

Adams Oyster Company was an oyster farm and seafood cannery business headquartered in Suffolk, Virginia, and by the 1950s was one of the largest oyster farm businesses in Virginia. The company held over 300 acres of oyster farms in the Nansemond River, Battens Bay, Bleakhorn Creek, Chuckatuck Creek, Cooper Creek, and the James River.

== History ==
By 1870, oystermen had planted themselves and their families on the peninsula between Chuckatuck Creek and the Nansemond River and drew a livelihood from the water. Members of the Adams family were oysterman in the area by the late 1880s. The Nansemond River was one of the richest oyster grounds in the Chesapeake Bay, and seafood businesses in Suffolk were shipping approximately 75,000 bushels of oysters a year by 1900.

In the 1920s, Charles Gray Adams I established an oyster company and oyster shucking house on the Hobson side of Chuckatuck Creek. Adams operated a fleet of over 30 boats out of the creek. Adams died in 1938.

The Adams Oyster Company was formally established in the 1940s by Adams' son, Captain Charles Gray "Charlie" Adams II and later became a partnership with Carl Bagnell when they merged the holdings with the Nansemond Fish and Oyster Company. The Adams Oysters Company sold oysters at local markets in Norfolk and shipped them to locations throughout the U.S. East Coast. The company also canned and sold a packaged oyster product called "Saltaire Oysters" and operated a steamed crab business near the Chuckatuck Creek location.

By the 1950s and 1960s, the "Saltaire Oysters" brand could be found in Kroger supermarkets, Fass Brothers, or Ballards. The company also sold directly to Colonial Stores and Campbell's for their canned oyster stew product, and was a certified interstate shellfish dealer. Charles Adams III worked for the company during this period, before being deployed to serve a tour of duty in the Vietnam War. In March 1968, Charles Adams III and three other watermen drowned when the oyster boat Klondike capsized with all four men on board.

The business activity had slowed by the end of the 1970s due to the decline of the oyster population and the Army Corps of Engineers construction of a dam on Carter's Clove Creek, which closed Hobson's direct outlet to Chuckatuck Creek and the James River. From the 1980s to the 2010s, the business remained registered as an active oyster farm with the Virginia Marine Resources Commission.
