= Mowi =

Norwegian seafood company

Mowi ASA
- Type: Allmennaksjeselskap
- Traded as: OSE: MOWI
- Industry: Seafood, food processing
- Founded: 2006 (current structure)
- Headquarters: Bergen, Norway
- Key people: Ivan Vindheim (CEO), Ole Eirik Lerøy (Chair), Leif Frode Onarheim (Deputy chair)
- Products: Farmed salmon and trout, processing and distribution of seafood
- Revenue: NOK 27.88 billion (2015)
- Net income: NOK 1.42 billion (2015) Harvest volume of salmonids, tonnes gutted weigh: 420 148 (2015)
- Total assets: NOK 40.26 billion (end 2015)
- Total equity: NOK 18.18 billion (end 2015)
- Number of employees: 14,195 (2025)
- Website: www.mowi.com

Mowi ASA (/ˈmoʊi/), known as Marine Harvest ASA until 2019 and as Pan Fish until 2007, is a Norwegian seafood company with operations in a number of countries around the world. The company's primary interest is fish farming, primarily salmon, the operations of which are focused on Norway, Scotland, Canada, the Faroe Islands, Ireland and Chile. The group has a share of 25 to 30% of the global salmon and trout market, making it the world's largest company in the sector. Mowi also owns a 'value added processing' unit, which prepares and distributes a range of seafood products, and a number of smaller divisions.

The company assumed its current form as a result of massive expansion in 2006, when Pan Fish ASA conducted an effective three-way merger with Marine Harvest N.V. and Fjord Seafood. The group is headquartered in Bergen and is listed on the Oslo Stock Exchange where it is a constituent of the benchmark OBX Index.

For 2023, the company reported revenue of €5.51bn (up 11% from 2022), net profit of €444.4M (down 43% from 2022) and a profit margin of 8.1% (down from 16% in 2022).

== History ==
=== Constituent companies ===
==== Marine Harvest ====
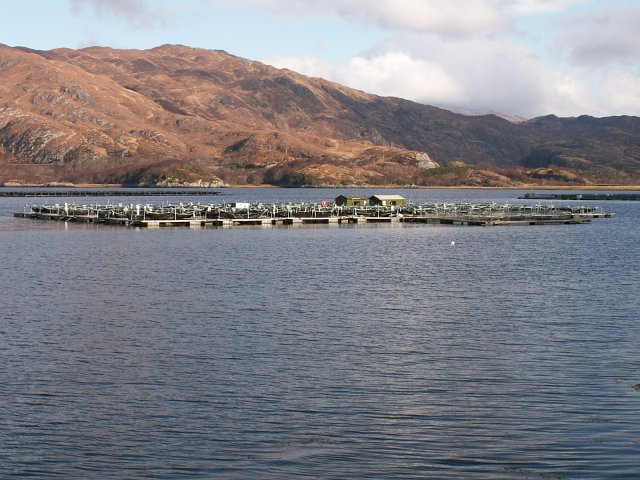
Mowi operation on Loch Ailort, Scotland, one of the oldest Atlantic salmon farms.

The first company to use the name Marine Harvest was founded in Lochailort, Scotland by Unilever in 1965 at the outset of the Atlantic salmon farming industry. Unilever had been developing farming methods at a research facility there. The company began operations in Chile in 1975, where fishmeal raw material, originally supplying the chicken protein farming industry, started developing alternative markets in salmon and shrimp proteins. In 1992, Unilever sold the business to Lord's Hanson and White, together with Ground Round restaurants, Tommy Armour golf clubs and a tuna processor in Long Island California. Marine Harvest International (MHI) IPO on the Amex made it the first pure aquaculture play on the global stock markets. Two years later Booker Plc took the company private with the MHI shrimp division, in Ecuador, being sold to Pronaca (an Ecuadorian feed company). With ownership of the company passing to Booker plc it was merged with Booker's aquaculture subsidiary, McConnell Salmon. After deciding to divest Marine Harvest McConnell so as to concentrate on its core cash and carry business in 1998, Booker eventually succeeded in finding a buyer in July 1999. The Dutch-based nutrition firm Nutreco acquired the unit for £ 32.7 million, adding it to its fish food and salmon farming unit. Nutreco's initial attempt to further expand into the fish farming sector by acquiring the seafood arm of Norsk Hydro was blocked on the recommendation of the United Kingdom Competition Commission in late 2000, but the deal was approved in March 2001 after Nutreco agreed not to acquire Hydro Seafood's Scottish assets.

Nutreco retained the name Marine Harvest for the unit's fish farming operations, and established interests in the emerging farmed cod, halibut, yellowtail and barramundi markets. In May 2005, Nutreco merged its fish-farming operations with the salmon, trout, halibut, tilapia, cod, sturgeon and caviar businesses of Stolt-Nielsen, creating a new stand-alone company, again named Marine Harvest. Nutreco held a 75% stake in the joint venture, with Stolt taking the remainder.

==== Pan Fish ====
Pan Fish Holding AS was founded in 1992 with a strategy to acquire many fish farms domestically and abroad. By 1997 the firm had made numerous acquisitions and opted to list on the Oslo Stock Exchange as Pan Fish ASA. However, the company had borrowed heavily to finance its rapid growth—by the end of 2001, debts had reached over NOK 4.7 billion. When the market price of salmon collapsed in 2001, Pan Fish encountered extreme financial difficulties, posting a heavy loss in 2002, and having to sell off assets in order to repay creditors. A major refinancing operation implemented in late 2002 coincided with the dismissal of the entire board of directors, including founder and CEO Arne Nore. The company slowly recovered over the following years, returning to profitability in 2005.

==== Fjord Seafood ====
Fjord Seafood has its origins in Torgnes Invest, a company founded in June 1996 which initially operated a single fish farm in the Norwegian town of Brønnøysund. Expansion over the following four years was aggressive—by September 2000, when Fjord Seafood (as it was now called) listed on the Oslo Stock Exchange, the company's portfolio comprised 60 ongrowing concessions, of which 50 were wholly owned, as well as a number of smolt and broodstock farms, slaughterhouses and processing factories. Fjord continued to conduct mergers and acquisitions - the purchase of Belgian fish-processing company Pieters N.V. in November 2000 was swiftly followed by the addition of ContiSea, the seafood joint-venture of ContiGroup and Seaboard Corporation.

As with Pan Fish, poor market conditions saw Fjord's share price worsen dramatically in 2001, and with it the ability to pay off its debts. The company's future was only secured thanks to a NOK 700 million bail out from major shareholders that September. Attempts to grow the company through merger and acquisitions were also frustrated—a planned merger with the aquaculture businesses of Domstein (then the biggest shareholder of Fjord) and state-controlled Cermaq was aborted in June 2002 after opposition from parties including ContiGroup and Seaboard, who controlled over 20% of shares between them. Nevertheless, Fjord stabilised its financial position through restructuring and cost-cutting measures.

=== Merger ===
Moves toward consolidation in the aquaculture sector were sparked by the activity of shipping magnate John Fredriksen, Norway's richest man before abandoning his citizenship of the country in 2006. Fredriksen's first major move into the industry came in the second quarter of 2005, when Domstein's 24% stake in Fjord Seafood was sold to his investment vehicle Geveran Trading. Around the same time, Pan Fish announced that two companies indirectly controlled by Fredriksen had acquired a combined 48% of the company's outstanding shares. In October of that year, with salmon prices high, Fjord submitted an offer for a majority stake in Cermaq to the Norwegian Government, which was preparing it for a public listing. However, as with the first merger attempt in 2002, Fjord failed in its bid—this time the offer was rejected by the Government.

Fredriksen's efforts to effect change finally bore fruit in March 2006, as Geveran Trading succeeded in purchasing Marine Harvest from its joint owners for €881 million, before immediately turning ownership over to Pan Fish. Geveran also sold its stake in Fjord Seafood to Pan Fish simultaneously. With its remaining shares purchased by Pan Fish, Fjord Seafood de-listed from the Oslo Stock Exchange on 6 July 2006. With regulatory hurdles in the United Kingdom and France cleared, the Marine Harvest group was brought under the control of Pan Fish by the end of 2006. To allow the merger to go ahead, the sale of the former Pan Fish Scotland division was agreed with the regulatory authorities. After an initial deal to sell the unit to Norskott Havbruk, owners of rival company Scottish Sea Farms, was called off in July 2007, Pan Fish Scotland was spun off into a separate publicly traded entity, Lighthouse Caledonia, that November.

Geveran Trading held a 28% stake in the company upon completion of the merger, a shareholding which has since increased to almost 30% as of March 2009.

==== Change in identity ====
With the creation of a much enlarged company complete, the Pan Fish management announced a complete change in its identity in December 2006. The firm's new brand was chosen to reflect each of its three main constituents: "Marine Harvest" was again revived as the new name for the company, and the Fjord Seafood slogan "excellence in seafood" and a reworked version of the Pan Fish motif were also included in the new logo. Atle Eide, CEO of Pan Fish from 2003, continued in his position, but resigned in September 2007 for personal reasons. Eide was replaced on an interim basis by Leif Frode Onarheim, before the CEO position was filled permanently by former GE Healthcare executive Åse Aulie Michelet in March 2008. Michelet was unexpectedly removed from her position in March 2010 and was replaced by former Lerøy Seafood CEO Alf-Helge Aarskog. In recent years Marine Harvest has also purchased Morpol.

In November 2019, Mowi appointed Ivan Vindheim as its new CEO, replacing Aarskog.

In 2023, the company planned to cut 435 jobs, reducing headcount by 12% as part of a cost-cutting programme that began in 2018. It also planned to optimise its business by automating processes and renegotiating agreements with suppliers. These measures were forecasted to save the company 25 million euros ($26.6 million), while insisting no jobs will be lost in the process.

== Operations ==
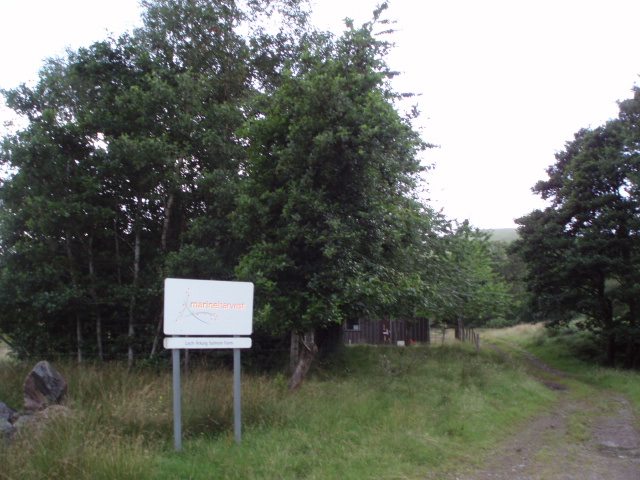
Entrance to a Marine Harvest farm on Loch Arkaig, Lochaber, Scotland.

Mowi produces Atlantic salmon, halibut and white fish. The company has an integrated value chain, with the company making its own broodstock in freshwater, followed by growth and maturing in seawater, harvesting, manufacturing in processing plants and distribution. Production peaked in 2015 at 420,148 metric tonnes (gutted weight) of salmonids with figures for more recent years being slightly lower.

Brand names used are Delifish (smoked fish from Chile), Ducktrap (smoked, in the United States), Clare Island Organic Salmon (from Ireland), Donegal Silver Salmon (from Ireland), Kendall Brook (salmon), Kritsen (smoked, in France), La Couronne (smoked, in Belgium), Pieters (distribution), Sterling White Halibut (from Norway), Xalar (salmon oil from Norway).

=== Production locations ===
==== Europe ====
In Norway, in addition to the corporate headquarters in Bergen and sales offices, Marine Harvest operates about 100 seawater sites along the coast. These are supplemented with 28 freshwater sites, two broodstock plants (in Ørland Municipality and Askøy Municipality), two hatcheries (in Øygarden Municipality and in the town of Rørvik) and four processing plants in (Eggesbønes, Herøy, Ryfisk, and Ulvan).

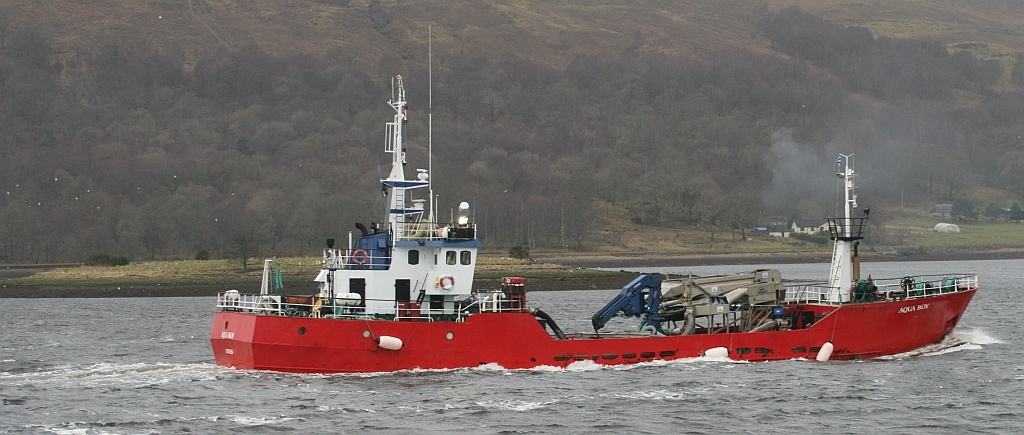
Aqua-Boy, a Norwegian live fish carrier used to service the Marine Harvest fish farms on the West coast of Scotland

In Scotland, Mowi operates 25 sea farms, plus three hatcheries (in Lochailort, Finfish and Inchmore), four freshwater loch sites, a harvest station in Mallaig and a processing plant in Fort William. Head office is in Rosyth and all produce is atlantic salmon. There is also a processing plant located in Rosyth.

In the Faroe Islands, Marine Harvest operates fresh water sites in Hellur, and seawater sites in Oyndarfjørður, Haldarsvík, Hósvík and Kollafjørður. Produce is Atlantic salmon.

In Ireland, Mowi operates one broodstock plant, two hatcheries, three fresh water sites, twelve seawater sites, three processing plants, all but four seawater sites in County Donegal, the latter being in County Mayo. Output is Atlantic salmon. Mowi also runs a salmon farm in Castletownbere and Inishfarnard.

==== Americas ====
In Chile, Mowi operates 53 seawater and 22 fresh water sites, in addition to four processing plants (in Calbuco, Chiloé, Puerto Montt and Santiago). Regional head office is located in Puerto Montt, and output is salmon, trout, coho and salar.

In British Columbia, Canada, Mowi operates two processing plants, seven hatcheries and 37 seawater sites near five towns in British Columbia: Campbell River, Port McNeill, Port Hardy, Quatsino and Klemtu. The product at these sites is Atlantic salmon.

In Atlantic Canada, New Brunswick and Newfoundland, Mowi purchased one hatchery and two fishing licenses in New Brunswick and a processing plant along with seven fishing licenses in Newfoundland in February 2017.

=== Processing and sales ===
In France, processing and distribution plants are located in Boulogne-sur-Mer, Challans, Lorient, Châteaugiron, Dunkerque, Poullaouen and Landivisiau. These support an extensive sales force throughout the country. In Belgium, processing and distribution plants are located in Bruges and Ostend. In the Netherlands, there is one processing plant in Lemmer. Additional European sales offices are located in Bologna, Italy, and Madrid, Spain.

In the United States, one processing plant is located in Maine, Another plant in Arlington (Texas) with a plant and sales offices in Miami. In Asia, sales offices are located in Singapore; Beijing, China; Tokyo, Japan; Taipei, Taiwan, and Busan, South Korea.

== Criticisms ==
Mowi has been criticised for destroying a large part of the weir Murray's Cauld on the Ettrick Water in Selkirk, Scotland, through what has been claimed to be inaction. The company sold its nearby fish farm to a local businessman for £1 in July 2008, who has since been permitted to commence repair work on the weir.

Mowi's operations have been severely affected in the south of Chile, where millions of fish have died by the disease infectious salmon anemia. The rapid propagation of the virus has motivated the enterprise to sell some of its facilities, firing more than a thousand employees, with the aim of moving its installations further south to the Aisén Region. Parasitic, viral and fungal infections are all disseminated when the fish are stressed and the centres are too close together. A spokesman for Marine Harvest recognized that his company was using too many antibiotics in Chile and that fish pens were too close, contributing to the dissemination of the ISA virus. Norwegian scientist Are Nylund has suggested that Marine Harvest introduced the ISA virus to the region by importing infected eggs from Norway.

In January 2017 Private Eye reported that Mowi had been depositing large quantities of the insecticide azamethiphos into Scottish waters to control sea lice in salmon. The Global Alliance Against Industrial Aquaculture called for the drug to be banned, citing risks to other species. Mowi had been responsible for the majority of an estimated 400 kg of the insecticide placed into Scottish waters in 2016.

In April 2019 Irish minister for marine Michael Creed discontinued a fish farm licence held by Mowi in County Kerry for overstocking.

On February 18, 2020 Mowi Scotland assistant manager Clive Hendry was crushed between workboat Beinn Na Caillich and a large barge while attempting to cross between them. He was seriously injured; a colleague grabbed his oilskin and lifejacket but he slipped out of them into the water where he drowned. The Marine Accident Investigation Branch criticised Mowi's safety processes, and recommended they employ marine experts to advise their senior management, and implement a safety management system that complied with the International Safety Management Code.

During the Russian invasion of Ukraine, MOWI imported rapeseed oil and soy protein concentrate from Russia for producing fish fodder. When the Norwegian fish food producer Isfjord became aware of this in 2026 after reports in Norwegian mass media, Isfjord stopped buying raw materials from MOWI.
