= Rappahannock Oyster Co. =

Seafood aquaculture company in Topping, Virginia

Rappahannock Oyster Co. is a seafood aquaculture company headquartered in Topping, Virginia.

== Background ==
The company was founded in 1899 by James Croxton. The company is currently operated by cousins Ryan and Travis Croxton, the great-grandsons of the founder. The company harvests four oyster varieties, Rappahannocks, Stingrays, Rochambeaus, Barcats, and Olde Salts, in addition to Olde Salt Clams. The business ships out more than 180,000 oysters per week.

In addition to the farming and wholesale business, the company has also operates six restaurants. The Rappahannock Oyster Bar was cited in the Wall Street Journal as one of the Five Outstanding Oyster Bars in the United States, and was named one of the Best New Restaurants by Esquire.

Restaurants owned and operated by the company have included:

- Merroir Tasting Room (Topping, Virginia)
- Rappahannock Restaurant (Richmond, Virginia)
- Rappahannock Oyster Bar (Charleston, South Carolina)
- Rappahannock Oyster Bar (Los Angeles, California)
- Rappahannock Oyster Bar (Union Market)
- Rappahannock Oyster Bar at the Wharf (Washington, D.C.)
