= Oberto Snacks Inc. =

American food company

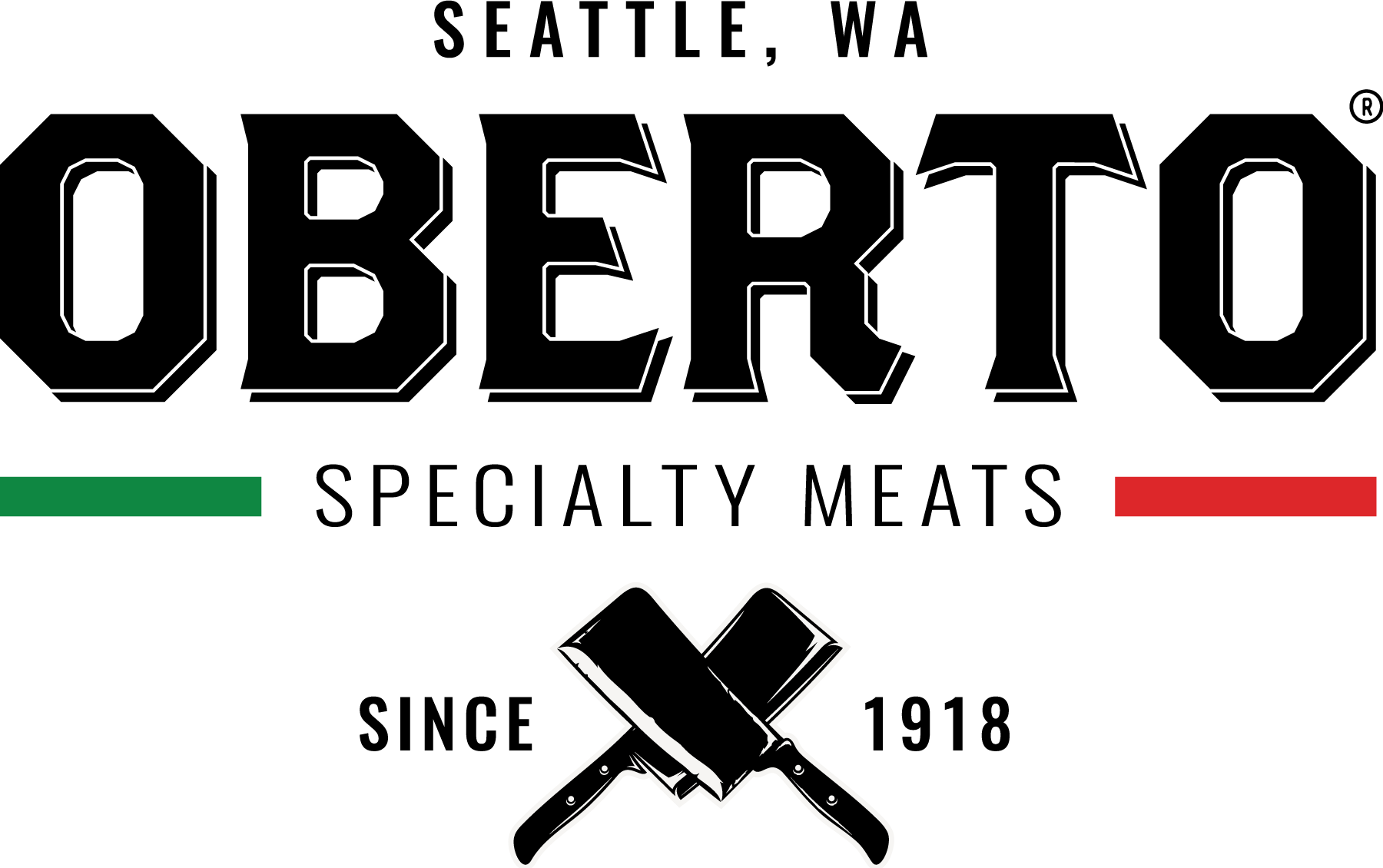
- Type: Subsidiary
- Industry: Food manufacturing
- Founded: 1918 in Seattle, Washington
- Founder: Constantino Oberto
- Headquarters: Kent, Washington
- Key people: Arlie Jacobs, President & CEO
- Products: Beef jerky, bacon jerky, chicken strips, meat snacks, pork jerky, turkey jerky
- Brands: Oberto, Lowerey's, Pacific Gold, Cattleman's Cut, Smokecraft
- Parent: Premium Brand Holdings
- Website: http://www.oberto.com/

Oberto is an American business that makes meat snacks including all natural jerky, pepperoni, charcuterie, chicken bites and other smoked meats. The company was founded in 1918 by Constantino Oberto in Seattle, Washington. It is now headquartered in Kent, Washington. The company sells products under the following brand names: Oberto, Oberto Classics, Lowrey's Meat Snacks, Pacific Gold Beef Jerky and Cattleman's Cut brands.

== History ==
Constantino Oberto founded Oberto Snacks Inc. (formerly known as Oberto Sausage Company) making and selling hand-made Italian sausage in Seattle, Washington, in 1918. Using Italian family recipes, he began making salami, coppacola and other sausages. On Labor Day 1943, Oberto died leaving his company and its two employees to his family. Art Oberto, Constantino's 16-year-old son, took over the company. He continued to run the company while completing his studies at West Seattle High School, resisting pressure to sell the business. By 1954, revenue had grown enough to begin construction on a new factory, completed the following year, with the help of a loan from the family of Oberto's new wife, Dorothy Vennetti.

Oberto continued to grow through the 1960s with the production of its flagship beef jerky product and introduction of the product at Safeway stores in 1967. Safeway was the first national grocery chain to carry Oberto jerky.

In 1990, Laura Oberto joined her father in a leadership role and became the co-chairman of the company. The following year, she took over as president of Oberto Snacks Inc.. In 1994, Oberto purchased Smoke Craft and Lowrey's meat snacks brands and facilities, both based in Albany, Oregon. The purchase added 200 employees to the company. In 1999, the company entered into a distribution partnership with the Frito-Lay company. In 2002, Oberto purchased the Pacific Sun Industries which produced the Pacific Gold brand.

In 2009, after slow sales, Oberto ended the distribution deal with Frito-Lay and began distributing its own products. Shortly after the agreement was terminated, Oberto named Tom Ennis CEO and president. The company adjusted the recipes for its flagship jerky products in 2012, removing corn syrup, preservatives, dextrose, and other artificial ingredients.

In 2013, Oberto opened a production and distribution center in Nashville, Tennessee. The factory added over 300 employees to the company's workforce. Ennis left the company in 2014 and Thomas Hernquist was named the CEO and president in January, 2015. In January 2016, Oberto announced they were closing the Nashville plant and laying off more than 80 people.

Oberto announced in April 2018 that it was being sold to Premium Brand Holdings.

== Marketing ==
Oberto's eccentric marketing tactics began with Art Oberto, who frequently drove an Oberto branded Lincoln Town Car, the "jerky mobile" around the Seattle area beginning in the 1950s. The company also sponsored a Hydroplane race boat from 1975 until the end of 2015.

The company's, "You Get Out What You Put In" campaign features professional athletes and has included snowboarder Louie Vito, Seattle Seahawks cornerback Richard Sherman, New England Patriots tight end Rob Gronkowski, the United States men's national soccer team, Clint Dempsey and sportscaster Dick Vitale talking to a little voice in their stomachs played by Stephen A. Smith.

The company has also recruited former NFL player, Brian Urlacher and trainer Harley Pasternak to join Dempsey and Vito as spokespeople for the brand and an active lifestyle.

Beginning in 2014, Oberto announced a partnership with the Tough Mudder events. As part of the deal Oberto also donated $100,000 to the Wounded Warrior Project. The partnership was renewed in 2015.

In 2015, the company launched a commercial during Shark Week in which the CEO throws a giant piece of jerky into the ocean and a Great white shark jumps from the water to eat it.
