= Atle Eide =

Norwegian businessman (born 1957)

Atle Sveinung Eide (born 1957) is a Norwegian businessman and partner, as of 2007, with HitecVision Private Equity. He is a former board member of Fokus Bank, Acta, Cermaq and SalMar. From 2003 to 2007 he was chief executive officer of Marine Harvest.
