= Nergård AS =

Norwegian seafood company

The Nergård Company is a Norwegian company focusing on the capture, distribution, and sale of fish products. It can trace itself back to a single fishing boat in 1947. It consists of the parent company Nergård AS and nine subsidiaries. Nergård AS was founded in 1972 in connection with the purchase of a new facility in Senjahopen.

Nergård is headquartered in Tromsø and has subsidiaries distributed throughout Nordland, Troms, and Finnmark. The company has approximately 450 employees and a revenue of over NOK 1.2 billion.

== Ownership structure ==
In 2010, Nergård Holding AS decided to exercise the option they had on the remaining shares in Nergård AS. This shareholding was previously owned by Lysnes Invest AS and Hopen Invest AS, and was approximately 51%. Today, the shareholding in Nergård Holding AS is equally distributed between four shareholders:

- Søstrene Nergård AS is owned by Nina and Helene Nergård and family, Kræmer AS, and the Torrissen family in Bodø.
- Bollagrunn AS is owned one-third by Norsk Sjømat AS and two-thirds by Bjarte Tunold.
- Welcon AS, where the Irish company Origin Enterprises PLC owns 50% and Austevoll Seafood ASA owns the remaining 50%.
- Arne Stang AS is owned by Arne Stang and his family. Stang is also CEO of Welcon AS.

== Research and development ==
Nergård Havfiske is participating in "Centre for Research-based Innovation" - (SEI). The centre was opened in 2011 and was given the name CRISP. They include a partnership with Norwegian Institute of Marine Research, NOFIMA, suppliers of fish finding equipment and trawler use. Nergård aims to conduct at measuring instruments for the identification and monitoring, environmental and selective fishing gear, as well as quality and value. The research has produced results; in 2013 the company added the result showing a promising future for improving the quality of fish.

== Equality ==
In 2012, 27% of all employees in Nergård were women. There was a quota of 45% women in the administration, in the industry and sales, whilst in the shipping company there was only 1%. The company group and other corporate governance consists only of men. The concern (group) are working on improving the distribution between men and women in leading positions through new recruits of employees. The board consists of eight men. The composition reflects the ownership in the parent company.

== Health, safety and environment ==
In the daily operation is health, safety and environment a big priority both for the distribution systems on land and with the companies fishing fleet. The Nergård-group had an average absence percent of 5.13% and had no serious damages to employees the year 2012. The highest absence was in the fish catching department were there too has been a big decline relative to the earlier years. Nergård has hired someone from occupational safety to take a closer look and prevent employee injuries while they are at work. Some positions in the group have a good share of heavy work with challenges of loud noises, moisture and cold temperatures. This is something the staff is trying to do something with, by hiring the occupational safety consultant. The group has their production companies localised in smaller places in North-Norway. This is a challenge to access and labor and has led to hiring of foreign men on contracts. Foreign employees are a challenge with the program that the company has, but that is a big priority to the staff to get it to work as well as possible.

== Subsidiaries ==
- Nergård Bø AS - Is owned by Nergård AS. The company has factories in Steinsjøen, for production of white fish. Dryfish is produced of cod, saithe and haddock.
- Nergård Eiendom AS - is owned by Nergård AS. The company owns and manages the properties of Nergård with factories and offices in Senjahopen.
- Nergård Havfiske AS - The company owns four trawlers with a total allowance factor on 13.09 for catching of cod and haddock and an allowance factor on 14.74 on catching of saithe. The company is registered as the next largest trawler company in Norway.
- Nergård Senja AS - is a company owned of Nergård AS. the company has factories in Gryllefjord, Senjahopen and Grunnfarnes and they have also one Receiving station for fish in Fjordgård. They are one of North Norway biggest providers of whitefish in quantity. The most important fish to the company are cod, haddock, saithe and Greenland halibut. Dryfish is produced by cod and saithe. Frozen fillets are produced by haddock, while the Greenland halibut is round frozen.
- Nergård Sild AS - Is owned by Nergård AS. The company has their factories in Senjahopen where they produce round frozen herring and different fillet products. Capelin and capelin roe is also produced.
- Nergård Sørøya AS - Is one of the main competitors in the North-Norway whitefish area. The main factory is located in Breivikbotn with Sørøya that is on the west end of Finnmark. The company is owned 92.5% by Nergård and 7.5% by Ole Iver Olsen.
- Lofoten Viking AS - is owned 52.3% by Nergård AS. Another 22.3% is owned by Arne Mathisen, 22.3% is owned by Lorentz Hardy and 3.2% owned by Jens-Petter Gylseth. The company has factories both for pelagic fish and whitefish. Frozen products and different fish fillets is produced from pelagic fish – herring, capelin, and mackerel. Stockfish is produced by cod, haddock and saithe, and a small amount of fresh fish sold, too. The company is also one on the world's largest exporters of Stockfish to the Italian market.

== History ==
The history of Nergård AS goes way back to the end of the 1940s. It all began in 1947 with a fishing boat that was called Ovedia that was owned by Arvid and Olga Nergård. The boat was used to travel along the coast of Finnmark and Lofoten to buy fish that were gutted and salted on board before it was sold to people. They had the boat for many years and were very successful. This developed to their purchase of a factory at the start of 1972. The factory was sited at Lysnes in Senja that is in Nord of Norway. Here the company "Arvid Nergård AS" was started. After a while, their son Ole-Arvid took over. He developed the company from being a factory in Lysnes to be a big group with many subsidiaries all around North-Norway.

In 2008 the owner Ole-Arvid died after being sick since 2006. After his death, the family chose to sell the shares in Nergård AS and the company got a new owner and a new name. So in 2010 was Nergård AS changed to Nergård Holding AS.
