= R v Marshall =

Judgement of the Supreme Court of Canada

R v Marshall (No 1) [1999] 3 S.C.R. 456 and R v Marshall (No 2) [1999] 3 S.C.R. 533 are two decisions given by the Supreme Court of Canada on a single case regarding a treaty right to fish.

== Decision No. 1 ==
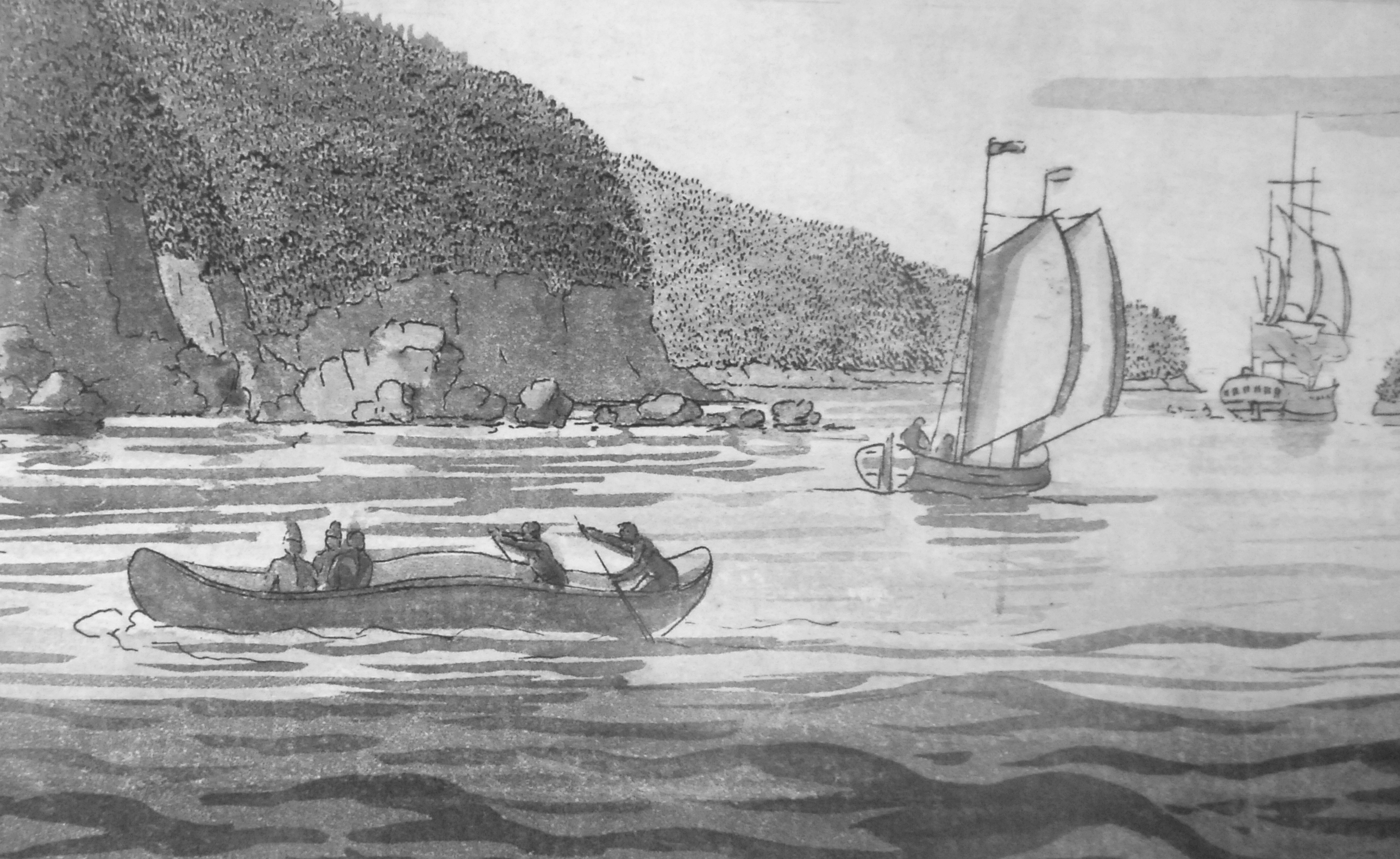
The case recognized the traditional role of fishing in Mi'kmaq culture. Shown is a seagoing canoe used for fishing and transport. Atlantic Neptune, ca 1770

The Court held in the first decision that Donald Marshall's catching and selling of eels was valid under 1760 and 1761 treaties between the Mi'kmaq and Britain and that federal fishery regulations governing a closed fishing season and the regulating and the requirement of licences to fish and sell the catch would infringe the treaty right.

In 1999, the court of appeal heard the Marshall case, indicated that the trial judge had made an error in law and overturned the decision (p. 89). The appeal judge Justice Binnie, stated that the trial judge's error was in not focusing attention on the Maliseet–British treaty of 1 February 1760.

=== Commentary ===
A 2009 book by a former Nova Scotia crown attorney, Alex M Cameron, who had argued similar cases for the Province against Indigenous logging, was sharply critical of the Supreme Court's decision in R v Marshall. Other commentators, including Greg Flynn (2010), and Dianne Pothier (2010), have seen Alex Cameron's analysis as lacking "nuance and balance," and as being "fundamentally flawed".

Cameron argues, among other things, that the Supreme Court was wrong in asserting that it was being asked to decide on the rights of all Mi'kmaq. He holds that the courts were being asked to decide only on the right of an individual Mi'kmaq from Cape Breton, Donald Marshall.

== Decision No. 2 ==
In its second decision, the Supreme Court elaborated the extension of Indigenous treaty rights stating that they are still subject to regulation when conservation is proven to be a concern or other public interests.

Both decisions proved highly controversial. The first elicited anger from the non-Indigenous fishing community for giving seemingly-complete immunity to Indigenous peoples to fish. The second decision, which was claimed to be an "elaboration," was seen as a retreat from the first decision and angered Indigenous communities. The second decision was issued on a motion for re-hearing the case brought by fishermen's associations in which the court elaborated in particular about such things as the relationship between treaty rights and conservation that had been more implicit in the first decision.

== See also ==
- Burnt Church Crisis
- Burying the Hatchet ceremony (Nova Scotia)
- Canadian Aboriginal case law
- The Canadian Crown and First Nations, Inuit and Métis
- Exclusive Economic Zone
- Indian Act
- Indian Health Transfer Policy (Canada)
- Numbered Treaties
- R. v. Marshall; R. v. Bernard
- Section Thirty-five of the Constitution Act, 1982
- Treaty Day (Nova Scotia)
- 2020 Mi'kmaq lobster dispute
