= Norwegian Seafood Federation =

Employer's organization in Norway

The Norwegian Seafood Federation (Norwegian: Fiskeri- og Havbruksnæringens Landsforening, FHL) is an employers' organisation in Norway, organized under the national Confederation of Norwegian Enterprise.

The current CEO is Geir Andreassen. Chairman of the board is Ole-Eirik Lerøy.
