= Clearwater Seafoods =

Canadian seafood company

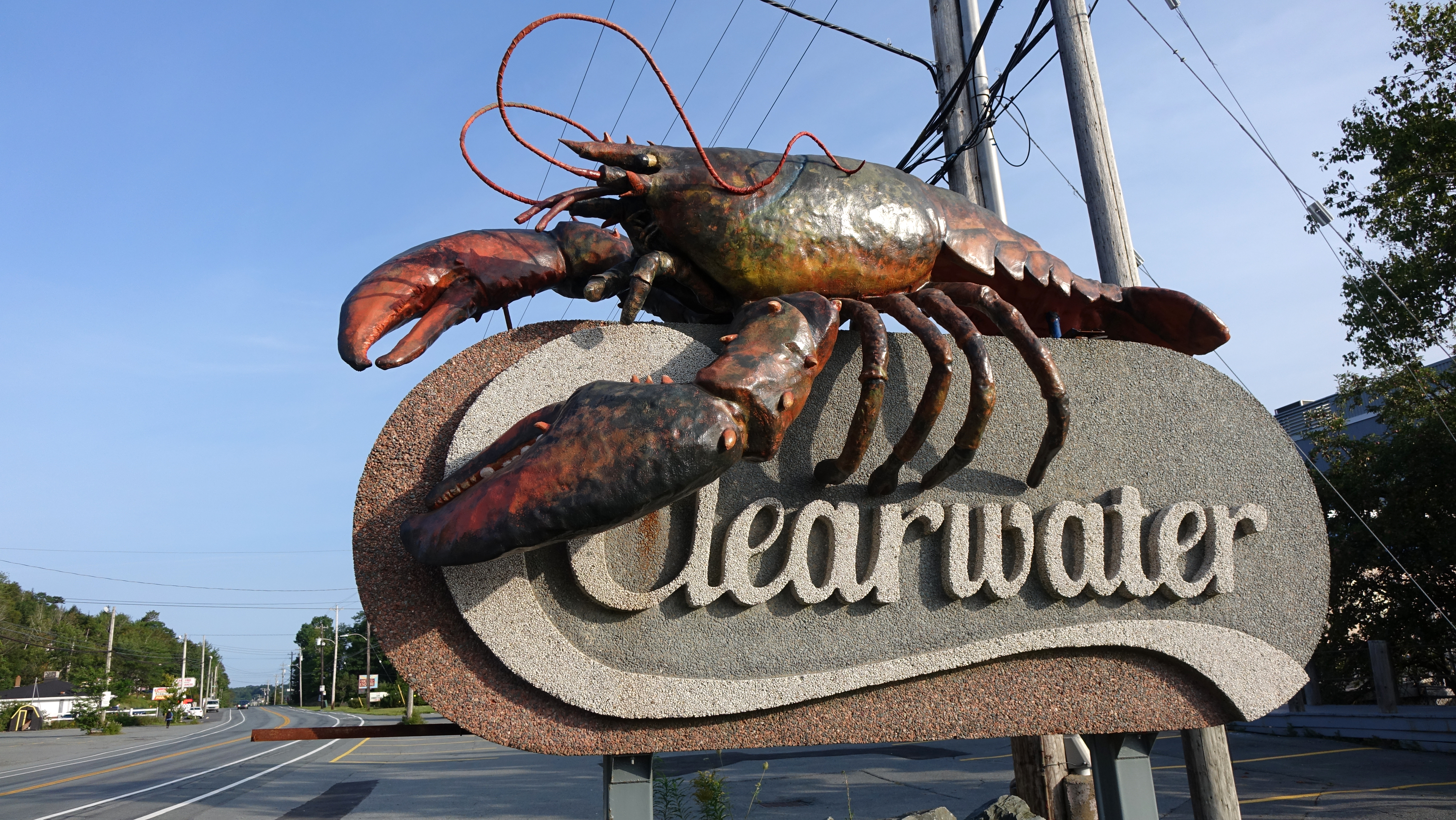
- Sign at Clearwater Seafoods headquarters
- Industry: Seafood
- Founded: 1976; 50 years ago
- Founders: John Risley and Colin MacDonald
- Headquarters: Bedford, Nova Scotia, Canada
- Owner: Premium Brands Holdings Corporation and FNC Holdings Limited Partnership
- Website: www.clearwater.ca/en/

Clearwater Seafoods is a seafood company based in Bedford, Nova Scotia, Canada. It is the largest shellfish producer in North America.

The company was founded in 1976 by John Risley and Colin MacDonald. The pair sold lobster out of a truck, and gradually expanded the business from there, reaching global revenues of Can$500 million in 2015.

Clearwater Seafoods is a vertically integrated producer, meaning it is involved in all stages of the process from harvest to distribution. The company fishes and processes products that include sea cucumber, crab, lobster, scallops, and clam, distributed in 59 countries. As of 2019 its global sales were Can$612 million. However, its sales were significantly impacted by the 2020 COVID-19 pandemic, particularly the cessation of live lobster sales in China.

In November 2020, it was announced that Clearwater Seafoods was acquired as a joint venture partnership between Premium Brands Holdings Corporation and a group of Mi’kmaq First Nations (under the name FNC Holdings Limited Partnership) for Can$1 billion. As part of this deal, the Mi'kmaq acquired all of the company's fishing licenses. Membertou First Nation Chief Terry Paul referred to the deal as a "generational acquisition" which "will have lasting positive impacts on the economics of our Mi'kmaq communities". Reports on this sale have commented that it may exacerbate the 2020 Mi'kmaq lobster dispute.
