= Premium Brands Holdings Corporation =

Canadian food manufacturing company

- Type: Public
- Traded as: TSX: PBH; S&P/TSX Composite Component
- Industry: Food Manufacturing and Distribution, Food service
- Founded: Richmond, British Columbia, Canada
- Headquarters: Richmond, British Columbia, Canada
- Key people: George Paleologou, President and Chief Executive Officer; Will Kalutycz, Chief Financial Officer
- Products: Foods
- Revenue: $4.931 billion CAN (2021)
- Number of employees: c.15,000
- Website: www.premiumbrandsholdings.com

Premium Brands Holdings Corporation is a Canadian specialty food manufacturing and distribution company. It is a publicly traded corporation on the Toronto Stock Exchange.

== History ==
Premium Brands was founded in 1917 as Fletcher Limited. It was renamed Fletcher Fine Foods in 1984. In 2000, the company re-branded to Premium Brands. The company sold its Fletcher's business in 2004. In 2005, it converted to an income trust, but it converted back to a normal corporation in 2009, through a complex deal with Thallion Pharmaceuticals. In its time as an income trust, the company had doubled revenues to $450 million. In 2010, Premium Brands acquired SK Food Group, a Seattle-based supplier of breakfast sandwiches and wraps to Starbucks, for $42.5 million. Partly as a result of increased sales of these products, Premium Brands' overall sales more than doubled in the 5 years from 2010 to 2015, to $1.2 billion. The company's sandwich sales increased from $156.8 million to $460 million in 2016. In 2016, the company purchased meat company C&C Packing for up to $146 million.

In April 2018, Premium Brands acquired Oberto Sausage Company.

On November 9, 2020, Premium Brands acquired Clearwater Seafoods for $1 billion in partnership with a group of Miꞌkmaq First Nations. The purchase represented the "largest investment in the seafood industry by a Canadian Indigenous group".

== Profile ==
Premium Brands owns a range of specialty food manufacturing and differentiated food distribution businesses with operations in Canada and the United States. As of 2017, approximately 60% of revenue was from food distribution, and 40% was from food manufacturing. Significant products include sandwiches (25% of revenue), processed meats (20% of revenue), beef (14% of revenue), and seafood (10% of revenue).

The company estimates it has about 50% of the packaged sandwich market in Canada, and 5-10% of the American market. It has sandwich manufacturing facilities in Columbus, Ohio, and Reno, Nevada, as well as two plants in Canada.

The Company's brands and businesses include Audrey's, B&C Foods, Belmont Meats, Bread Garden GO, Buddy's Kitchen, C&C Packing, Centennial Foodservice, Concord Premium Meats, Conte Foods, Country Prime Meats, Creekside Bakehouse, Diana's Seafood, Deli Chef, Duso's, Fletcher's US, Freybe, Frandon Seafood, Gloria’s Best of Fresh, Gourmet Chef, Expresco, Grimm’s, Harlan’s, Harvest, Ready Seafood, Hempler’s, Multi-Task Cold Storage Inc, Hub City Fisheries, Hygaard, Interprovincial Meat Sales, Isernio's, Island City Baking, Larosa Fine Foods, Leadbetters, McSweeney’s, Maximum Seafood, Oberto Brands, Ocean Miracle, OvenPride, Partners, Piller's, Premier Meat Packers, Quality Fast Foods, Raybern's, Shahir, Shaw Bakers, Skilcor Food Products, Stuyver's Bakestudio, SK Food Group, The Meat Factory, Westcadia and Yorkshire Valley Farms.

== See also ==
- Income trust
- Meat processing
- Pork

== Official website ==
- Official website
