= National Fisheries Institute =

US trade group representing seafood industry

Logo of the National Fisheries Institute.

The National Fisheries Institute (NFI) is the United States industry trade group representing the seafood industry. It is a member of the International Coalition of Fisheries Associations (ICFA). Its member companies consist of all levels of business involved in seafood, from fishing vessel operators to seafood restaurants.

== Members ==
The National Fisheries Institute has a wide variety of stakeholders represented in its membership. Members include the following: Associates/Suppliers to the Industry, Bank & Financial Services, Broadline Distributors, Exporters, Importers, Processors, Producers, Retailers & Groceries, Seafood Restaurants, Suppliers, Trade Associations & Universities, and Wholesalers. Some well-known members include Wells Fargo Bank, Sysco Corporation, US Food Inc., National Fish and Seafood Inc., Seatrade International Inc., Wal-Mart, Red Lobster Seafood Co., and Santa Monica Seafood. A full list of current members can be viewed on the NFI website.

The National Fisheries Institute (NFI) and its members claim to be committed to practices that preserve the proper management of the environments of the world’s ocean. They endorse the United Nations Principles for Responsible Fisheries. The members of NFI also stress for generic seafood brand consumption to increase sales for the companies of the members. They also decide what to spend money on for endorsing, for example they decided to spend $35 million on advertising for the benefits of seafood consumption.

== Future of North American Fisheries ==
The NFI works to improve sustainability through studies of the ocean by catches and other studies by scientists. The role a study of the ocean can play in improving the harvesting of the resources, and improving the present fish harvesting methods is important for the quality of catch (NAFC, NFI, FCC, 1966).
