= Domstein =

Norwegian fishing company

Domstein ASA
- Company type: Aksjeselskap
- Industry: Fisheries
- Headquarters: Måløy, Norway
- Area served: Norway
- Key people: Rolf Domstein (CEO); Anne Breiby (Chairman)
- Revenue: ▲NOK 1,918 million (2006)
- Operating income: NOK -23 million (2006)
- Net income: NOK -45 million (2006)
- Number of employees: 585 (2007)
- Website: www.domstein.no

Domstein is a Norwegian fishing company based in Måløy. The company is controlled by Rolf Domstein.

== Operations ==
Through the division Domstein Fish AS the group has production facilities for white fish in Måløy as well as a partial ownership in Ultra Seafood Loppa. Products are exported to Europe.

The subsidiary Domstein Enghav AS with head office in Oslo produces frozen fish for the Nordic market branded as Enghav with plants in Vardø, Haugesund, Kungshamn and Lysekil.

Norway Pelagic ASA was founded in 2007 when Domstein Pelagic merged with Global Fish, Bernt Hansen, Bergen Fiskeindustri and Koralfisk. Production plants are located in Sommarøy, Bodø, Ålesund, Liavåg, Selje, Måløy, Kalvåg, Florø, Bergen and Karmøy.

The shipping section Ervik Havfiske that Domstein owns 50% of operates twelve fishing boats that fish 11,000 tonnes annually based on auto line.
