= French ship Astrolabe =

Seven ships of the French Navy have borne the name Astrolabe, after the instrument astrolabe

== Ships ==
- Astrolabe (1781) of La Pérouse (1781), a converted fluyt
- Boussole (1782) was briefly named Astrolabe in 1785
- Astrolabe (1811) of Dumont d'Urville (1817), a converted horse-carrying fluyt
- Coquille (1812), a 14-gun corvette, was renamed Astrolabe in 1825.
- Astrolabe (1918), a hydrograph ship, lead ship of her class
- Astrolabe (1945), a hydrographic ship, formerly the German Zieten
- L'Astrolabe (1986 icebreaker), an icebreaker built as Fort Resolution and renamed in 1988
- L'Astrolabe (2016 icebreaker), an icebreaker built in 2017
Ships of the French Navy named Astrolabe
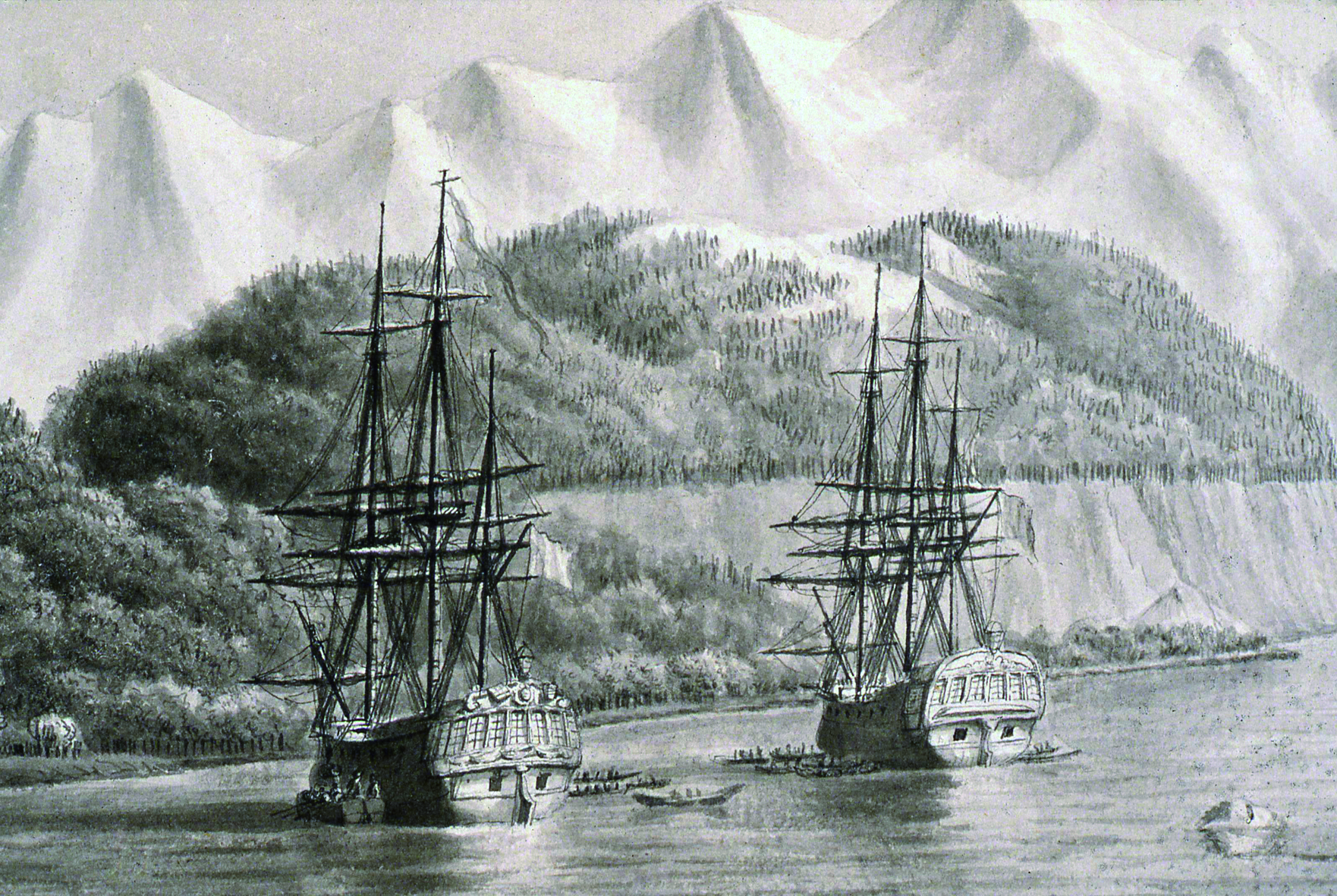
Astrolabe and Boussole

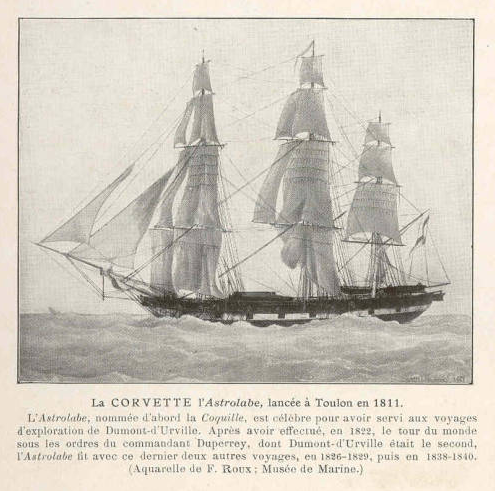
Astrolabe (1817)

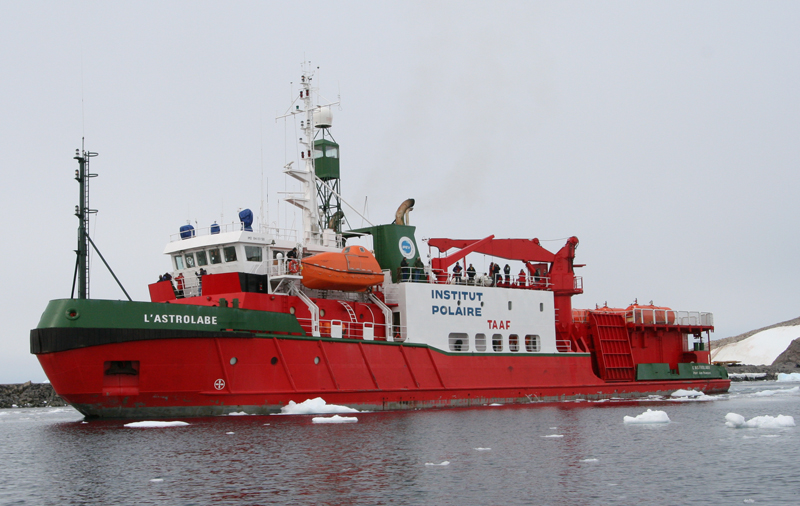
Astrolabe (1986)

== See also ==
- Astrolabe (disambiguation)

== Notes and references ==
=== Bibliography ===
- Roche, Jean-Michel (2005). Dictionnaire des bâtiments de la flotte de guerre française de Colbert à nos jours. Vol. 1. Group Retozel-Maury Millau. p. 54. ISBN 978-2-9525917-0-6. OCLC 165892922.
- Roche, Jean-Michel (2005). Dictionnaire des bâtiments de la flotte de guerre française de Colbert à nos jours. Vol. 2. Group Retozel-Maury Millau. p. 54. ISBN 978-2-9525917-0-6. OCLC 165892922.
