= European Supporter =

Former armed patrol vessel, converted to a cable layer

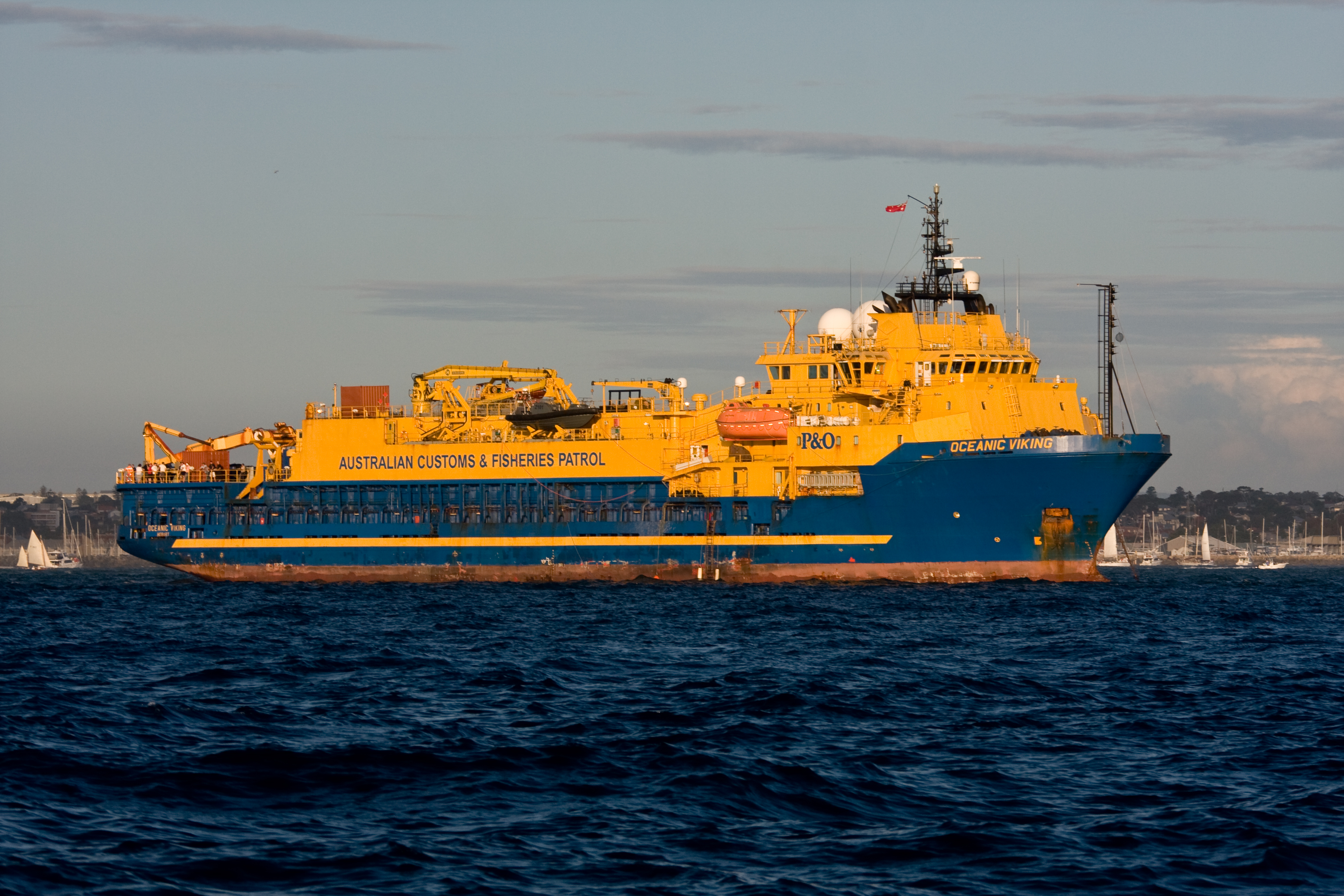
- MV Oceanic Viking in Fremantle Harbour in March 2010

History

Australia
- Name: MV Oceanic Viking
- Owner: P&O Maritime Logistics
- Operator: P&O Maritime Logistics
- Builder: Flekkefjord Slipp & Maskinfabrikk, Flekkefjord, Norway
- Launched: 1996
- Out of service: June 2010
- Identification: MMSI number: 503483000; IMO number: 9126584; Call sign: VNTG

History

Isle of Man
- Name: European Supporter
- Owner: P&O Maritime Logistics
- Operator: P&O Maritime Logistics
- Port of registry: Douglas, Isle of Man
- Builder: Flekkefjord Slipp & Maskinfabrikk
- Yard number: 961
- Launched: 17 February 1996
- Identification: IMO number: 9126584; MMSI number: 235083046
- Status: In service

General characteristics
- Class & type: DnV + 1A1 Cable Laying Vessel
- Tonnage: 9,075 GT
- Length: 105.6 m (346 ft)
- Beam: 22 m (72 ft)
- Draught: 6.83 m (22.4 ft)
- Propulsion: 2 x 3,560 kW (4770 hp) at 660 rpm
- Speed: 16 knots (30 km/h; 18 mph)
- Complement: 25 crew + up to 50 Customs and Fisheries officers.
- Armament: 2 × .50 caliber machine guns in customs service
- Notes: Former offshore oil pipeline layer and cable layer

European Supporter was a vessel that performed a number of roles during its career. Built in 1996 as the offshore supply vessel Viking Lady for Norwegian shipping company Eidesvik Shipping, the ship was converted into a cable layer in 2000 and renamed Oceanic Viking. It was chartered to the Australian Customs Marine Unit through P&O Maritime Logistics from 2004 to 2010. In 2011, it was renamed European Supporter and transferred to the United Kingdom.

== Construction ==
The ship was built in 1996 for Norwegian shipping company Eidesvik Shipping as an offshore supply vessel and named Viking Lady. The vessel is 105.6 metres (346 ft) long and has a gross tonnage of over 9,000.

== History ==
=== Eidesvik Shipping ===
In 2000, the ship was converted to a cable layer, renamed Oceanic Viking, and used for laying optic fiber cables between Europe and North America.

=== Australian Customs Service ===
In 2004, Oceanic Viking was converted to an armed patrol vessel and bareboat chartered to P&O Maritime Logistics, who operated the ship for the Australian Customs Marine Unit. The vessel was primarily assigned to patrols of Australia's southern offshore territories for illegal fishers, particularly those seeking Patagonian toothfish, but was also deployed on other border protection and patrol operations around Australia. While chartered, Oceanic Viking was flagged as an Australian vessel, and was operated by a 60-strong crew, including Customs and Fisheries personnel, along with civilians. Oceanic Viking was fitted with two .50 calibre machine guns, making it the first Australian-flagged merchant vessel to be armed in peacetime.

In early September 2005, Oceanic Viking intercepted a 2,000 GT Cambodian vessel found poaching in the Southern Ocean. Later that month, the ship apprehended three Indonesian vessels illegally fishing near the Northern Territory's Wessel Islands; one of the vessels failed to stop when ordered, and one of Oceanic Viking's machine guns was used to fire warning shots.

In October 2006, Oceanic Viking traveled 1,800 nautical miles (3,300 km; 2,100 mi) in eight days to answer a medical distress call from the Kerguelen Islands.

In December 2007, the Australian government tasked the Oceanic Viking with monitoring Japanese-flagged vessels involved in whaling in the Southern Ocean. During the seven-week surveillance exercise, personnel aboard Oceanic Viking filmed Japanese whalers and their activities to gather evidence for possible legal action. The machine guns were secured below deck during the surveillance mission. During the deployment, two Sea Shepherd Conservation Society protesters who boarded the whaling ship Yūshin Maru No. 2 were transferred to Oceanic Viking after being detained by the Japanese. The Australian government regarded the operation as successful, but it was criticised by some political commentators, such as Dennis Shanahan, as not having been effective in countering Japanese whaling, and potentially harming Japanese-Australian relations.

In October 2009, Oceanic Viking was involved in an operation to apprehend 78 Sri Lankan asylum seekers and move them to an Australia-funded immigration detention centre on the Indonesian island of Bintan for processing. The asylum seekers were taken to Indonesia but refused to disembark until 17 November, after a preferential processing deal was agreed upon. The 78 asylum seekers were transferred to Indonesian detention, and after a month, were determined to be refugees by the United Nations High Commissioner for Refugees and resettled in several countries. While travelling back to Australia, Oceanic Viking intercepted a boat on 3 December carrying 53 suspected asylum seekers and four crew off the Ashmore Islands; the 50th asylum seeker vessel to be intercepted in Australian waters in 2009.

=== European Supporter ===
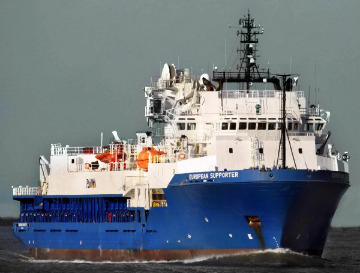
The European Supporter

Oceanic Viking was taken out of service in June 2011. It was replaced by the chartered offshore supply ship MV Skandi Bergen which was renamed ACV Ocean Protector. Oceanic Viking subsequently became the UK-flagged MV European Supporter.

The European Supporter was fitted out at A&P Tyne, so she would be able to install power cables between wind turbines to take advantage of the rapidly expanding offshore renewables market in the UK and Europe. A 7 m (23 ft) long abrasion resistant steel chute was installed onto the vessel's stern, from which cables could be lowered onto the sea bed. Other work included a major overhaul of the generators, modifications to the steelwork inside the hangar accommodating the ROVs and to the switchboard, electrical repairs and refurbishment of the pumps. The European Supporter has the capacity to accommodate 5,000 tons of power cable in two static tanks, using a newly installed power cable loading arm.
