= Paal Wilson & Co =

Norwegian shipping company

Paal Wilson & Co A/S
- Industry: Shipping
- Founded: 1942; 84 years ago
- Defunct: 1993; 33 years ago
- Fate: Merger
- Successor: Jebsen Wilson Euro Carriers
- Headquarters: Bergen, Norway
- Key people: Paal Wilson (founder)

Paal Wilson & Co A/S was a shipping company founded in 1942 that operated short sea liner services throughout Europe. It merged its operations with Jebsens in 1993 when they formed Jebsen Wilson Euro Carriers. Paal Wilson & Co merged with Euro carriers in 2001 to create Wilson ASA.

== History ==
Paal Wilson (1911–1985) started his own shipping company in 1942 after having worked for a shipping and mining company. At first the company chartered vessels providing services to companies such as Hafslund and Bjølvefossen. He expanded with the use of chartered vessels, and soon started with transatlantic sailings, including lumber transport from British Columbia to Europe. In 1957 Wilson started the branded service Norwegian Rhine Line that provided point-to-point services from the Rhine to Norway without having to go via Rotterdam. Customers included Hafslund, Tinfos, Øye Smelteverk, Elkem and Årdal og Sunndal Verk.

In 1958 Rieber & Søn bought 40% of the company, and by 1982 Wilson managed 42 Rhine-fitted vessels in addition to transatlantic lumber vessels. In 1985 Paal Wilson died, and Rieber & Søn wanted to withdraw. In 1988 IPG Shipping bought 67% of the company, and in 1993 the operational division was transferred to the joint venture Jebsen Wilson Euro Carriers. In 1995 Kristian Eidesvik bought part of Paal Wilson & Co, and by 2001 he owned the entire group that was renamed Wilson ASA.
