= Eidesvik Offshore =

Norwegian shipping company

Eidesvik Offshore ASA
- Company type: Public (OSE: EIOF)
- Industry: Shipping
- Headquarters: Bømlo Municipality, Norway
- Area served: Global
- Number of employees: 470 (2007)
- Website: www.eidesvik.no

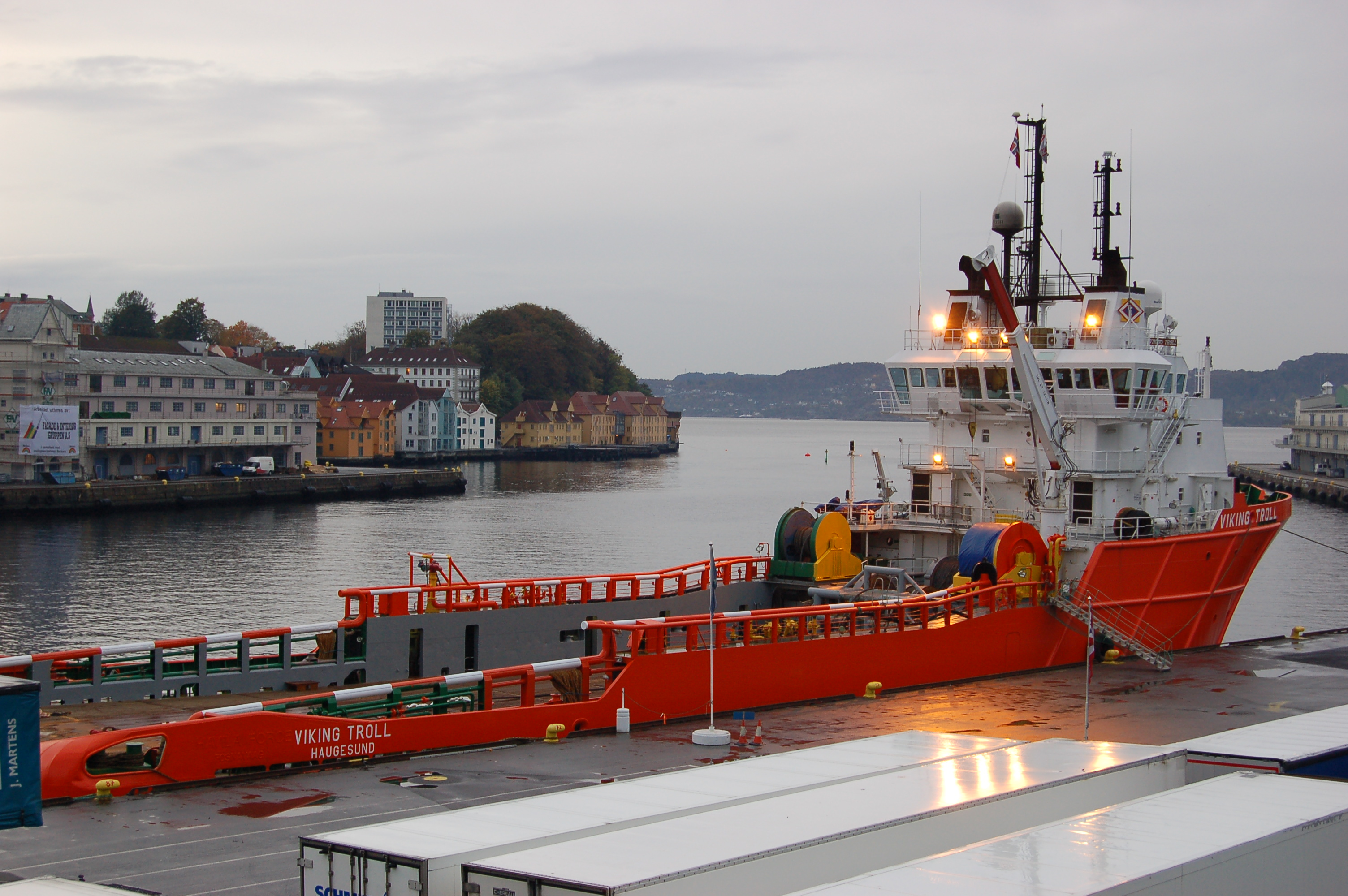
The Eidesvik Offshore supply vessel Viking Troll at dock in Bergen

Eidesvik Offshore is a supply, subsea, seismic and cable-laying shipping company. The fleet consists of ten supply ships, both platform supply vessels and anchor handling tug supply vessels, five subsea vessels, five seismic vessels and one cable-laying ship. All the ships are orange in color, and most of them have names starting with Viking. The company is based in Bømlo Municipality, Norway and is listed on the Oslo Stock Exchange. Two thirds of the company is owned by Kristian Eidesvik, who also controls the short sea shipping company Wilson.

== History ==
In August 2024, the company signed a contract with Wärtsilä to supply the equipment for the conversion of an offshore platform supply vessel (PSV) to operate with ammonia fuel.

In February 2025, the company together with Agalas and Reach Subsea, started the building of a construction support vessel (CSV) for subsea and offshore wind operations. The CSV will be built at Sefine Shipyard in Turkey and use methanol as a fuel.
