= P&O Maritime Logistics =

- Formerly: P&O Maritime
- Company type: Subsidiary
- Headquarters: Dubai, United Arab Emirates
- Key people: Martin Helweg, CEO
- Parent: DP World

P&O Maritime Logistics, formerly P&O Maritime Services, has been operating in the maritime industry since the 1960s. The company has evolved over the years, they are active in the offshore renewables space and provide a wide variety vessels to support offshore activities within Europe including; survey, maintenance, operation, construction, power cable lay and inspection services. P&O Maritime was formed in the 1960s, and has offices worldwide. In 2019, following parent company DP World's acquisition of Topaz Energy & Marine, Topaz and P&O Marine were merged to create the new P&O Maritime Logistics.

Former logo of P&O Maritime Services, prior to the merger.

== Company Fleet ==
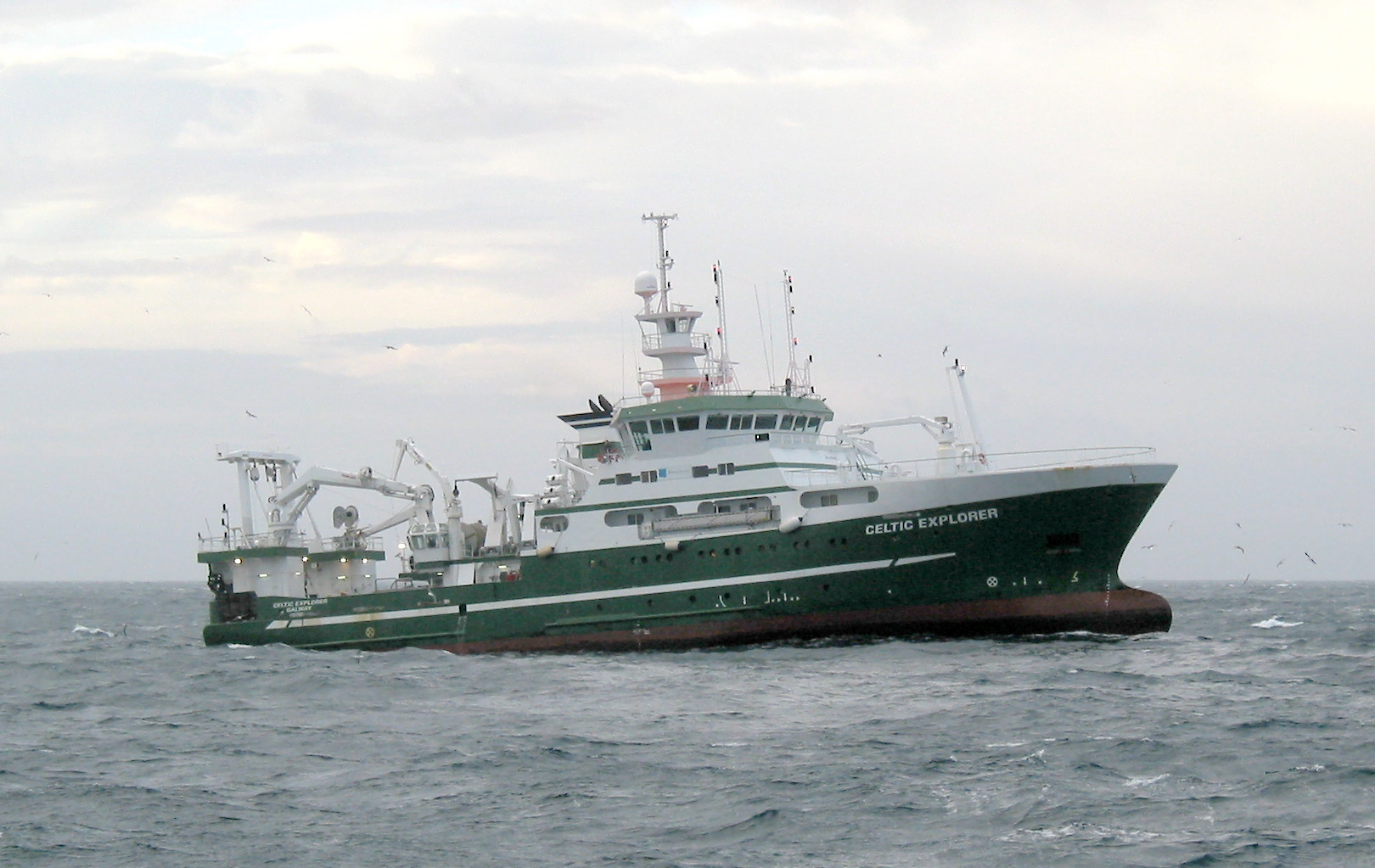
RV Celtic Explorer, a multi-purpose research vessel at sea in Galway Bay, Ireland.

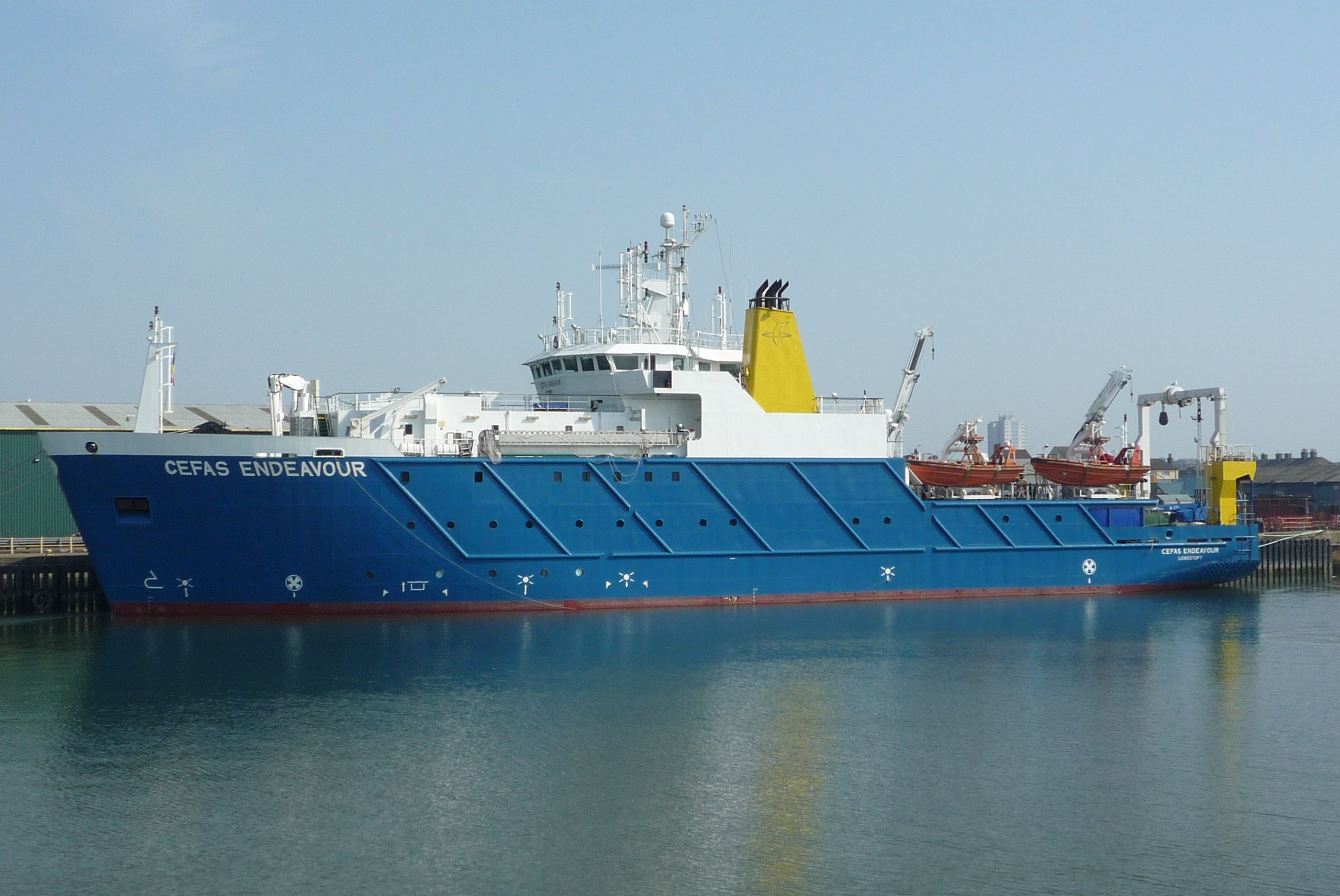
Cefas Endeavour moored in the Inner Harbour, Lowestoft

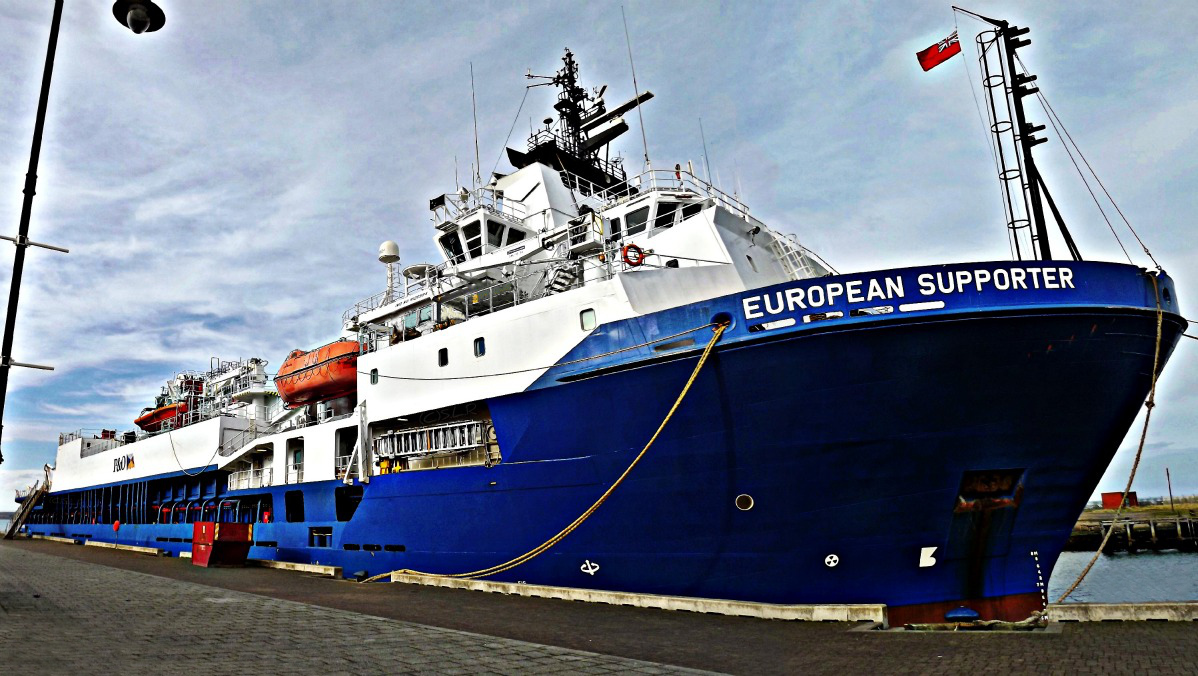
European Supporter docked at Blyth

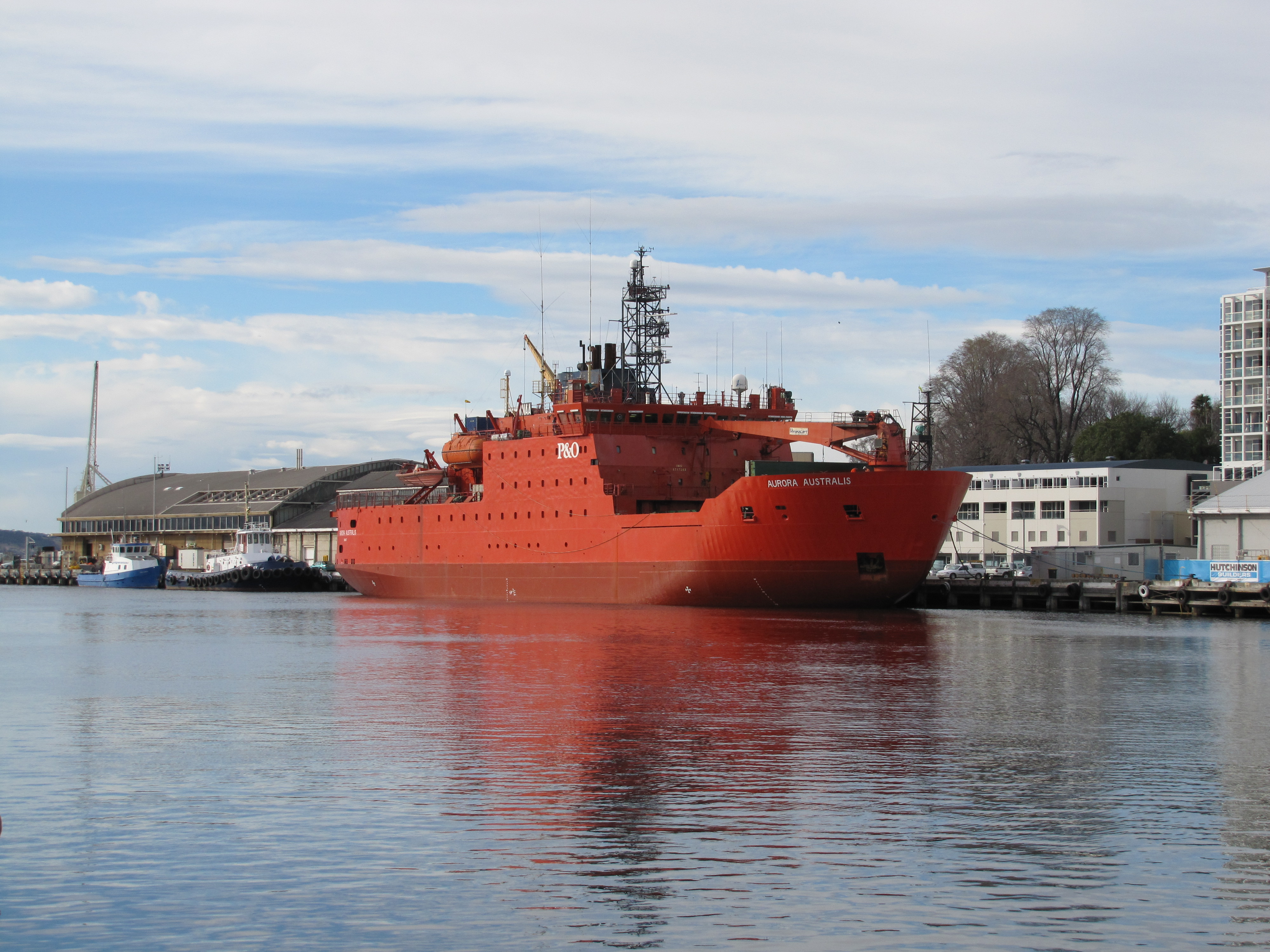
Aurora Australis docked at Hobart in 2010

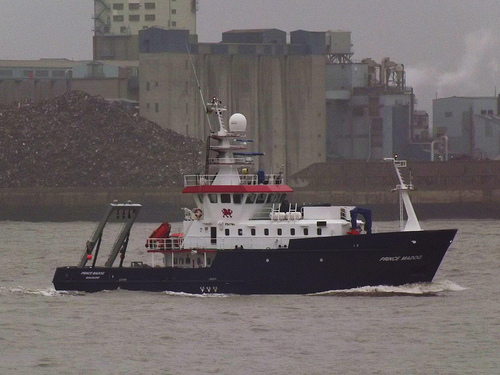
Prince Madog in Mersey

Government Shipping Services Fleet

Name	Built	Type
Aurora Australis	1990	Icebreaker
L'Astrolabe	1986	Multi Purpose Offshore Vessel
Southern Surveyor	1972	Fishing Research
Celtic Explorer	2003	Multi Purpose Research Vessel
Celtic Voyager	1997	Research Vessel

Research & Survey

Name	Built	Type
Prince Madog	2001	Research/survey vessel
RV Cefas Endeavour	2003	Fisheries Research Vessel

Port Services Fleet

Name	Built	Type
Shadeed	1986	Tug
Shamal	2004	Tug
Al Wasl	1997	Tug
Raheeb	2000	Tug
Sinyar	2006	Tug
Mihaiz	1998	Tug
Al Mutwakal	1999	Tug
Asad	2009	Tug
Namer	2009	Tug
Timrar	2009	Tug
Al Minsaf	2009	Tug
Murshid	2008	Pilot Boat
Morjan	2004	Pilot Boat
Rubban	2004	Pilot Boat
Al Toofan	1997	Pilot Boat
Gazelle	1990/91	Pilot Boat
Al Faidh	1997	Pilot Boat
Naseem	1990	Pilot Boat
Nashwan	2008	Utility Vessel
Riffa	2003	Mooring Boat
Wafa	1998	Mooring Boat
Laila	1990	Mooring Boat
Dina	1993	Mooring Boat
Ahmose	2005	Tug
Ramses	2008	Tug

Cargo Services Fleet:

Name	Built	Type
Aburri	1995	Self Discharging Ore Carrier
Wunma	1999	Self Discharging Ore Carrier
Western Endeavour	1988	Bulk Carrier
Western Enterprise	1989	Bulk Carrier
Western Flyer	1990	Bulk Carrier
Western Star	1990	Bulk Carrier
Western Triumph	1992	Bulk Carrier
Western Zenith	1993	Bulk Carrier
Western Venturer	1985	Science Research Assistance

Offshore Renewables Support

Name	Built	Type
Santa Ana	2011	Offshore Renewables Support

Offshore Fleet & Cable Lay Offshore Renewables Support

Name	Built	Type
Southern Supporter	1994	Multi Purpose
CS European Supporter	1996	Multi Purpose Vessel

Defence Fleet
DMS Maritime owns and/or manages and operates a fleet of more than 550 vessels, including multi purpose vessels, harbour and ocean tugs, torpedo recovery vessels, landing craft, diving launches, workboats and general harbour support vessels of various sizes, a submarine trial support vessel, sailing vessels, an Antarctic survey vessel and rigid hull inflatable boats.
