= L'Astrolabe (2016 icebreaker) =

French icebreaker used to bring supplies to the Dumont d'Urville Station in Antarctica

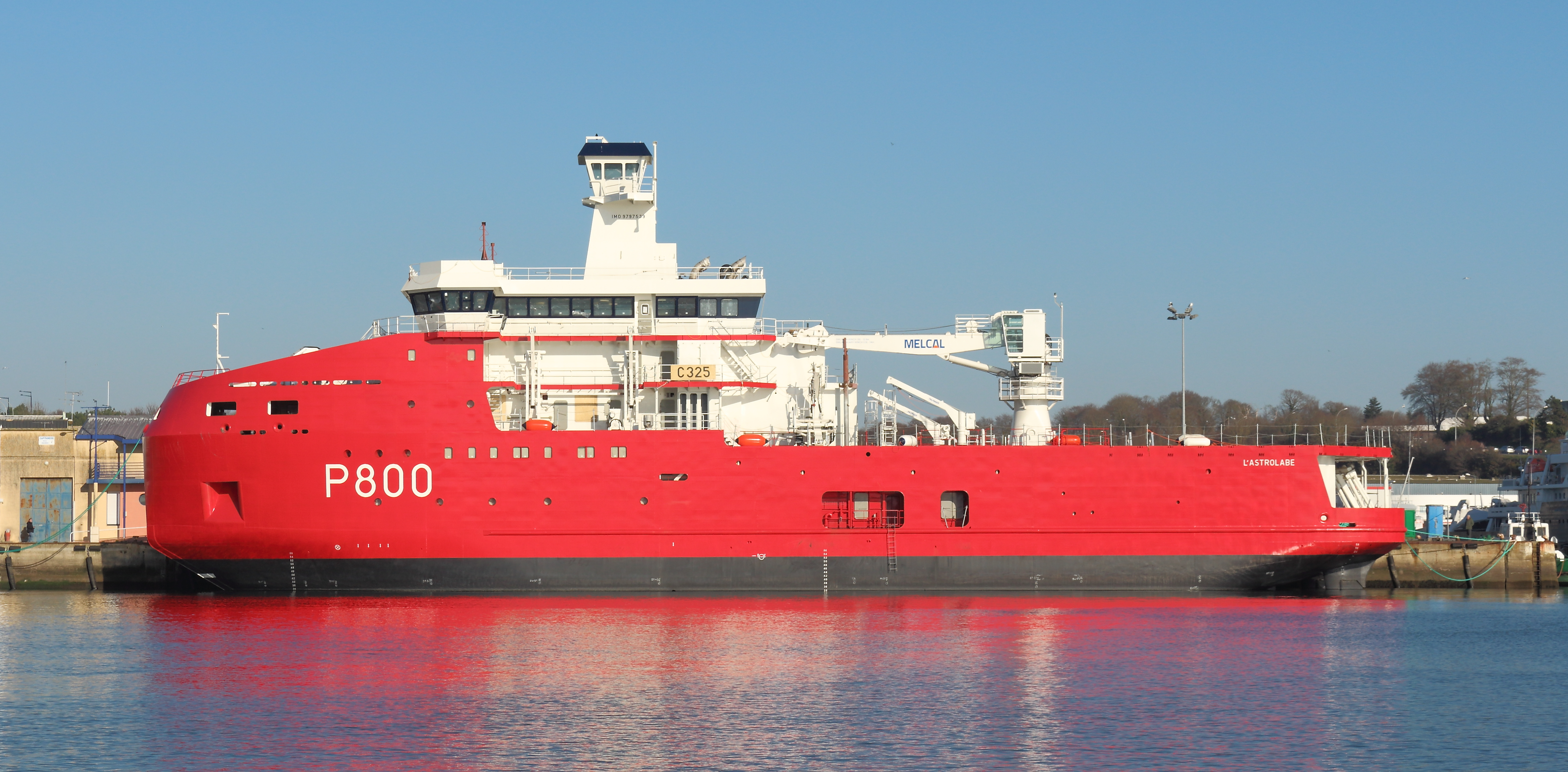
- L'Astrolabe in Concarneau, France, on 22 January 2017.

France
- Name: L'Astrolabe
- Namesake: Astrolabe
- Owner: French Southern and Antarctic Lands administration
- Port of registry: Concarneau, France
- Ordered: June 2015
- Builder: CRIST (Gdynia, Poland) (hull); Chantiers Piriou (Concarneau, France) (outfitting)
- Cost: 50 million euro
- Yard number: C325
- Launched: 22 December 2016
- Christened: 12 July 2017
- Completed: September 2017
- Home port: Réunion
- Identification: IMO number: 9797539; MMSI number: 228090600; Call sign: FJYC; Pennant number: P800
- Status: In service

General characteristics
- Type: Icebreaker
- Tonnage: 2,028 GT; 3,000 DWT
- Length: 72 m (236 ft)
- Beam: 16 m (52 ft)
- Ice class: BV Icebreaker 5
- Installed power: 4 × Wärtsilä 8L20 (4 × 1,600 kW)
- Propulsion: Two shafts; controllable pitch propellers
- Speed: 14 knots (26 km/h; 16 mph) (max); 12 knots (22 km/h; 14 mph) (cruising)
- Endurance: 35 days at 12 knots (22 km/h; 14 mph)
- Capacity: 1,200 tons of cargo; Accommodation for 60 personnel
- Aviation facilities: Helipad and hangar

L'Astrolabe is a French icebreaker that is used to bring personnel and supplies to the Dumont d'Urville Station in Antarctica. The vessel, built by Chantiers Piriou and delivered in September 2017, replaced the 1986-built vessel of the same name.

== Development and construction ==
In June 2015, the Ministry of Overseas France awarded the construction of a 50 million euro polar logistics vessel to the Chantiers Piriou from Concarneau in Brittany. The vessel, based on a concept developed by French naval architecture company Marine Assistance, combines the functions of the two existing French ships it replaced: the 1966-built patrol vessel L'Albatros and the 1986-built icebreaker L'Astrolabe. The new vessel is owned and operated by the French Southern and Antarctic Lands (TAAF) administration, the French Polar Institute Paul-Émile Victor (IPEV) and the French Navy.

Since Chantiers Piriou had no experience of building an ice-going vessel, the French shipyard joined forces with the Finnish engineering company Aker Arctic in order to be able to bid against foreign shipyards such as the German Nordic Yards. Later, Aker Arctic was also chosen to carry out basic design and ice model testing for the vessel.

Since the Chantiers Piriou shipyard was fully booked with ship orders from the French Navy, the construction of the hull was subcontracted to a Polish shipyard. The production of the vessel began on 16 December 2015 at CRIST in Gdynia, Poland. On 22 December 2016, approximately one year later, the vessel was floated out from the dry dock. The unfinished vessel was then towed to France for final outfitting. The ship, which was given the name L'Astrolabe after her predecessor on 12 July, was delivered in September 2017.

== Career ==
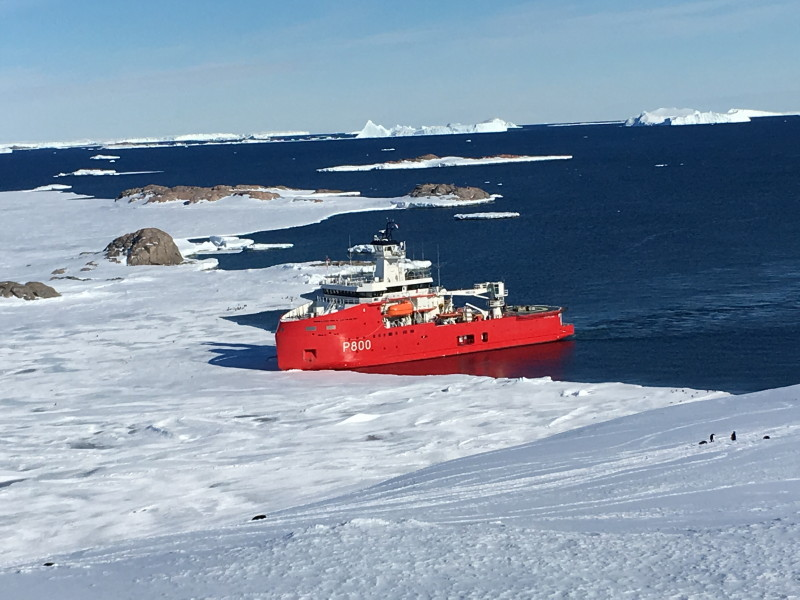
L'Astrolabe at work.

L'Astrolabe was deployed in the Indian Ocean in 2017, and carried out her first resupply mission to the Dumont d'Urville Station in Adélie Land, Antarctica, in 2018.

In November 2019, a major defect in the ship's propeller forced L'Astrolabe to cancel the resupply mission to France's Antarctic research stations. French expeditioners, cargo and supplies will instead be carried on the Australian icebreaker Aurora Australis which was made available by the Australian Antarctic Division.

In spring 2021 the ship engaged in a surveillance and fisheries patrol mission around the Scattered Islands and Mayotte to monitor the French Exclusive Economic Zones (EEZs). In September 2021 the ship docked at the BAE Systems Shipyard near Fremantle, Western Australia for some out of water repairs.

In June 2024, the ship conducted a patrol in waters of the French Southern and Antarctic Lands, including delivering personnel for rotation to Tromelin Island.

L'astrolabe is owned by the French Southern and Antarctic Lands (TAAF) and operated and maintained by the French Navy.

== Design ==
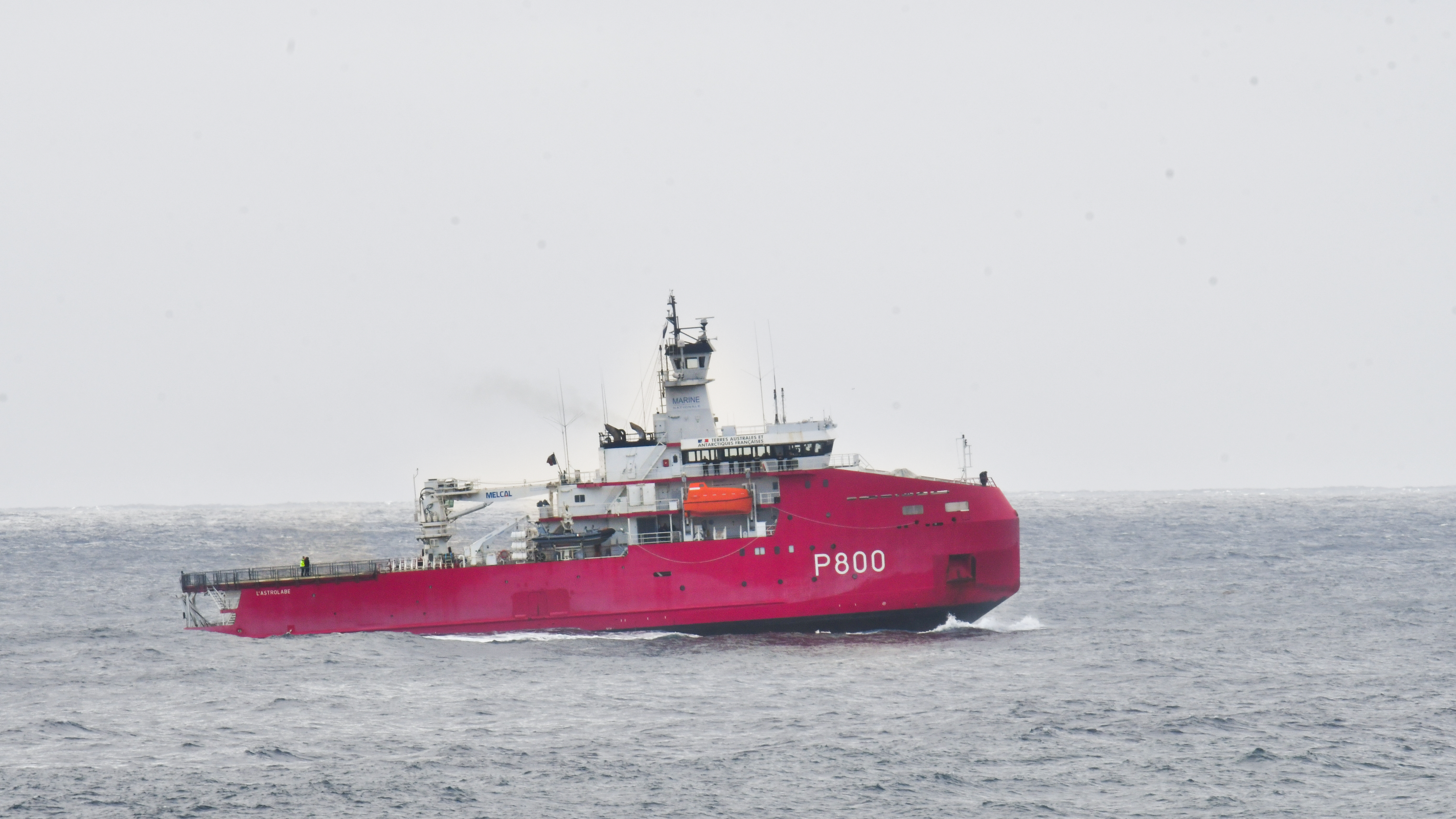
L'Astrolabe off the coast of Amsterdam Island in the southern Indian Ocean, 2021.

L'Astrolabe is 72 metres (236 ft) long and 16 metres (52 ft), making the new vessel somewhat larger than her 66-metre (217 ft) predecessor. The vessel can carry 1,200 tons of cargo and has accommodation for up to 60 personnel, which includes the crew of the vessel. She can also accommodate a helicopter belowdecks.

The vessel is powered by four 1,600 kW (2,100 hp) Wärtsilä 8L20 medium-speed diesel engines driving two stainless steel controllable pitch propellers. She is also fitted with selective catalytic reduction units to reduce NO_{x} emissions and comply with IMO Tier III emission regulations.

L'Astrolabe is classified by Bureau Veritas. Her ice class, Icebreaker 5, means that she is allowed to operate independently in medium first-year-ice up to 1.2 metres (3.9 ft) thick during the summer and autumn and up to 1 metre (3.3 ft) thick during the winter and spring. The vessel is also allowed to ram ice at a speed of 5.5 knots (10.2 km/h; 6.3 mph), but the ramming shall not be repeated if the ice does not fail at the first attempt.
