= Astrolabe (disambiguation) =

== Astronomy ==
An astrolabe (as the word is used from the medieval period through today) is the name of a specific astronomical instrument.

Another meaning are a type of Babylonian cuneiform tablets that discuss astronomy.

Prior to that, "astrolabe" was an adjective in ancient times describing any tool made for taking the position of stars, for instance by Ptolemy in the Almagest.

Astrolabe may also refer to:

== Places ==
- Astrolabe Bay, a large body of water off the northern coast Papua New Guinea
- Astrolabe Island, an island in the Bransfield Strait, Trinity Peninsula, Antarctica
- Astrolabe Lake, a lake in Renfrew County, Ontario, Canada
- Astrolabe Reef, a reef located off the port of Tauranga, New Zealand

== Other uses ==
- French ship Astrolabe, several French ships
- Astrolabe Company, a German colonial society
- Astrolabe languages, a group of Austronesian languages of Madang Province, Papua New Guinea
- Mariner's astrolabe, a navigational tool that differs from a proper astrolabe
- Astrolabe, the son of Abelard (c. 1079–1142) and Heloise

== See also ==
- Astrolab, an astronomy museum associated with the Mont Mégantic Observatory in Mont Mégantic Park, Québec, Canada
- Astrolabe v. Olson, a 2011 lawsuit filed against the maintainers of the tz Database
