= Aurora Australis (icebreaker) =

Australian icebreaker and research ship

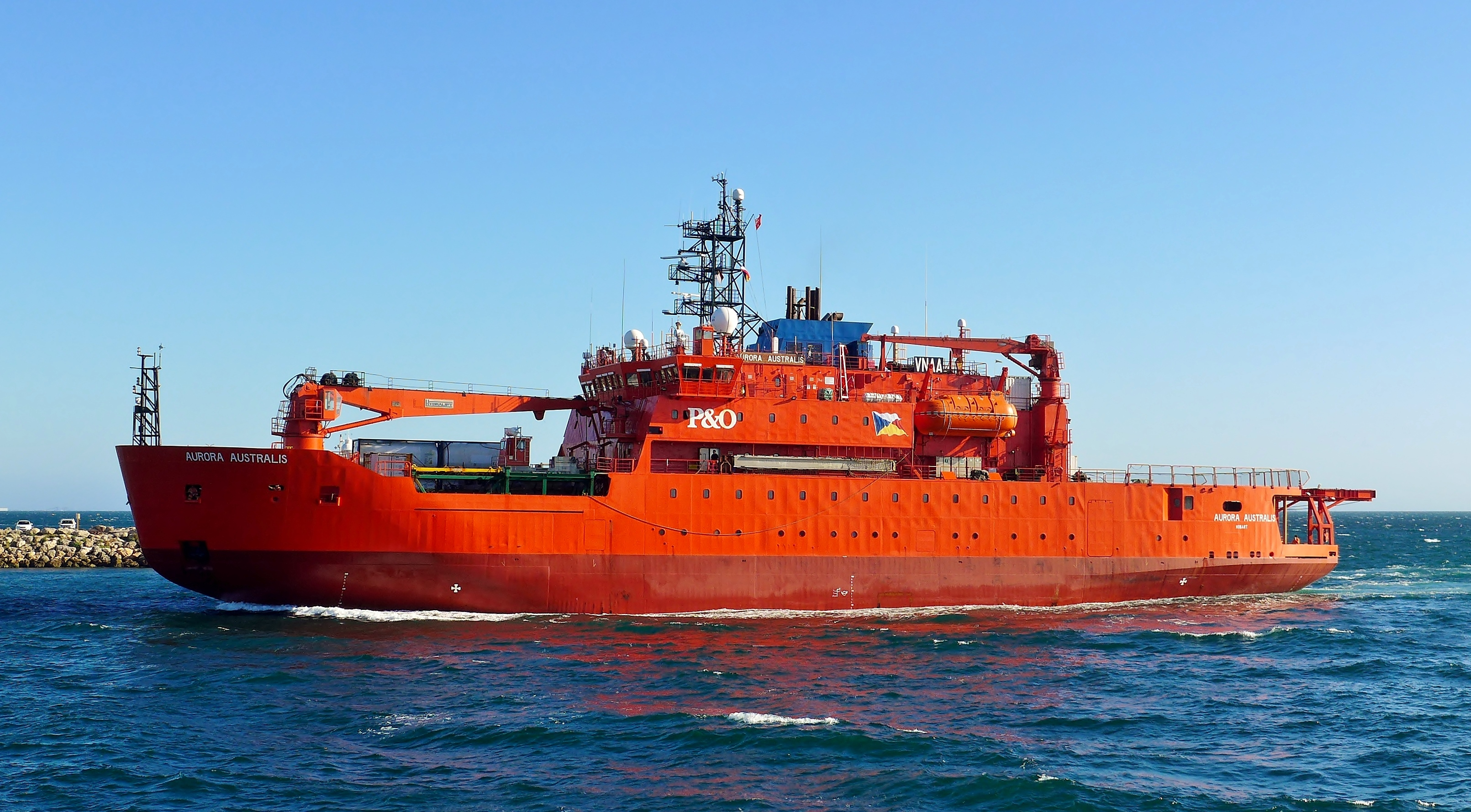
- Aurora Australis in Fremantle Harbour, 2016

History

Australia
- Name: RSV Aurora Australis
- Namesake: Aurora Australis
- Owner: P&O Maritime Services
- Operator: P&O Polar
- Ordered: December 1987
- Builder: Carrington Slipways, Tomago, Australia
- Yard number: 207
- Laid down: 28 October 1988
- Launched: 10 September 1989
- Commissioned: 29 March 1990
- Decommissioned: March 2020
- Home port: Hobart
- Identification: IMO number: 8717283; MMSI number: 503043000; Call sign: VNAA
- Nickname(s): Orange Roughy
- Status: Decommissioned

General characteristics
- Type: Icebreaker
- Tonnage: 6,574 GT; 3,911 DWT
- Displacement: 8,158 tons
- Length: 94.91 m (311.4 ft)
- Beam: 20.3 m (67 ft)
- Draught: 7.862 m (25.79 ft)
- Depth: 10.43 m (34.2 ft)
- Ice class: 1A Super; CASPPRIce Class 2 (midship); CASPPR Ice Class 3 (ends)
- Installed power: Wärtsilä 16V32D (5,500 kW) and 12V32D (4,500 kW)
- Propulsion: One controllable-pitch propeller; One bow thruster; Two stern thrusters
- Speed: 16.8 knots (31.1 km/h; 19.3 mph) (max); 13 knots (24 km/h; 15 mph) (cruising); 2.5 knots (4.6 km/h; 2.9 mph) (1.23 m (4.0 ft) ice)
- Capacity: 1,700 m^{3} (60,000 cu ft) of break bulk cargo; 1,000 m^{3} (35,000 cu ft) of supply fuel in tanks; 29 TEU; 116 passengers
- Crew: 24
- Aircraft carried: Up to four helicopters
- Aviation facilities: Hangar and helideck

RSV Aurora Australis was an Australian icebreaker. Built by Carrington Slipways and launched in 1989, the vessel is owned by P&O Maritime Services. It was regularly chartered by the Australian Antarctic Division (AAD) for research cruises in Antarctic waters and to support Australian stations in Antarctica.

As of 2025, the former Aurora Australis is laid up in Vũng Tàu, Vietnam, as Aurora Dubai.

== Design and construction ==
Designed as a multi-purpose research and resupply ship, Aurora Australis was built by Carrington Slipways in Tomago, New South Wales. The vessel was launched in September 1989.

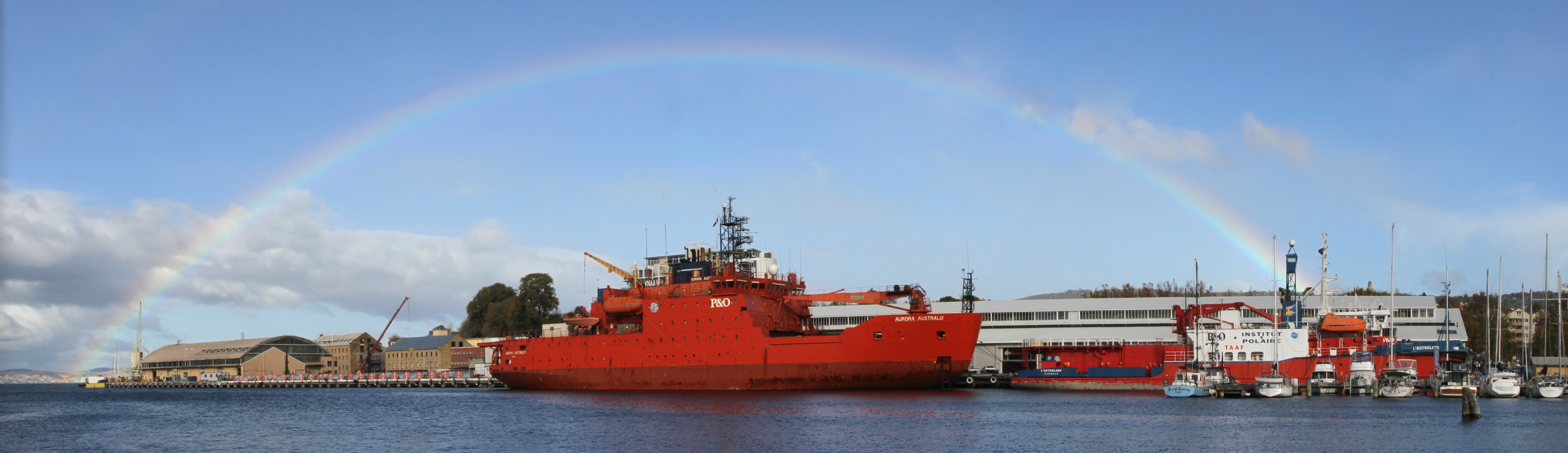
Aurora Australis berthed in Hobart under a rainbow, with the French research vessel L'Astrolabe to the right.

Aurora Australis is 94.91 metres (311.4 ft) long, and has a beam of 20.3 metres (67 ft), draught of 7.862 metres (25.79 ft) and moulded depth of 10.43 metres (34.2 ft). Her displacement is 8,158 tons, gross tonnage 6,574 and deadweight tonnage 3,911 tons.

Her propulsion machinery consists of two Wärtsilä medium-speed diesel engines in father-son arrangement, one 16-cylinder 16V32D producing 5,500 kW and one 12-cylinder 12V32D producing 4,500 kW. Both engines are coupled to a single shaft through a reduction gear, driving a single, left-hand-turning controllable-pitch propeller.

Slow speed manoeuvring is achieved with three manoeuvring thrusters, one forward and two aft. Aurora Australis has a maximum speed of 16.8 knots (31.1 km/h; 19.3 mph), and a cruising speed of 13 knots (24 km/h; 15 mph). The vessel can break level ice up to 1.23 metres (4 ft 0 in) thick at 2.5 knots (4.6 km/h; 2.9 mph).

Aurora Australis had a crew of 24 and could carry up to 116 passengers accommodated in three or four-bunk cabins with attached bathrooms. The ship has a cargo capacity of 1,700 cubic metres (60,000 cu ft) for break bulk or 29 twenty-foot equivalent containers, and a supply tank that can hold 1,000 cubic metres (35,000 cu ft) of fuel. The ship is fitted with laboratories for biological, meteorological, and oceanographic research, and was designed with a trawl deck for the deployment and recovery of research instruments while at sea. The ship's hangar and helideck allow for the operation of up to three helicopters, usually Eurocopter Squirrels or Sikorsky S-76s.

== Operations ==
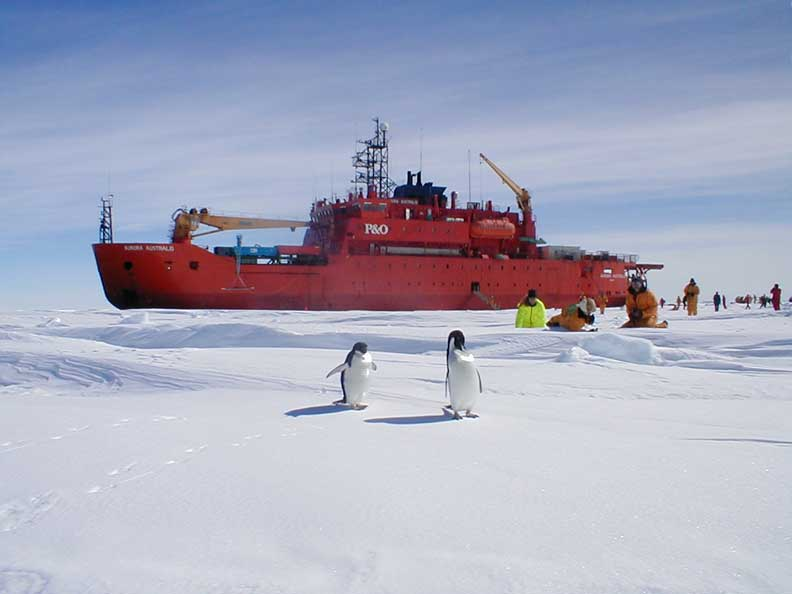
Researchers from Aurora Australis observing a pair of penguins

Aurora Australis was chartered by the AAD over the southern summer for research purposes, and to support the Antarctic bases operated by the AAD. The vessel spent most winters in port in Hobart, as the AAD headquarters is in the nearby town of Kingston. P&O sometimes chartered the ship for other work during winter.

On 8 May 2011, Aurora Australis was chartered by the Department of Defence for a two-month deployment, ending 30 June, as an amphibious transport ship supporting the Royal Australian Navy. The charter, costing A$3.375 million, was to assist in the Australian government response to humanitarian crises and natural disasters that occurred while the naval heavy lift ship HMAS Tobruk underwent maintenance.

In late December 2013, Aurora Australis, Chinese research vessel Xue Long and French icebreaker L'Astrolabe attempted to rescue Akademik Shokalskiy, which had become stranded in thick Antarctic ice in Watt Bay. None of the three ships were able to reach the Russian icebreaker, with Aurora Australis aborting efforts on the morning of 30 December, due to the risk of the ship also becoming stuck. On 2 February, the 52 passengers from Akademik Shokalskiy were transported by helicopter to Aurora Australis by Xuě Lóng's helicopter, the Chinese icebreaker having become trapped as well. After the rescue, Aurora Australis continued on her original mission to resupply Casey Station, before returning to Hobart on 22 January.

The Aurora Australis returned from its final voyage in March 2020. After 31 years of service to the Australian Antarctic Program, the last trip was a two-week voyage to resupply Macquarie Island and transport expeditioners to the south. Suggestions have been made that the ship could be used as an emergency vessel if acquired by the Australian Government. Another possible use that was suggested for the ship was as an Antarctic-themed museum berthed in Hobart. A not-for-profit organisation, the Aurora Australis Foundation, was established to explore this option. However, by June 2020 it looked like the most likely outcome for the Aurora Australis was to be sold to the Government of Argentina for further Antarctic deployment.

== Engine Room Fire ==
At 2.25am on 22 July 1998 whilst en route to Antarctica a fire broke out in the engine room. The researchers were on the first winter voyage to the Antarctic, a seven-week expedition to explore, the Mertz Glacier Polynya.

On 14 January 1999 whilst en route to Antarctica a fire caused by leaking high pressure diesel igniting on the hot STBD main engine caused a major fire. The fire resulted in zero visibility in the engine room and was suppressed by the release of halonium ion fire suppression system. Re-entry to the compartment resulted in successful restoration of power and propulsion to the ship and it returned to Fremantle under its own power for an investigation by the Australian Transport Safety Bureau and major repairs.

== Grounding ==
On 24 February 2016, the vessel was damaged when it ran aground in Horseshoe Harbour, near Mawson Station, Antarctica, during a blizzard, after a shackle on a forward mooring line came undone, causing the other three lines to break. It was refloated on 27 February 2016 and returned to Western Australia for repairs.

== Replacement ==
In October 2015, the Australian government announced a plan to acquire a new icebreaker to replace Aurora Australis by 2019. Nuyina entered service in 2021.

Aurora Australis was decommissioned in 2020, amid attempts to retain the vessel in Hobart as a floating museum. Although these efforts were unsuccessful, the ship's tender, Aurora Australis II, was acquired by the Aurora Australis Foundation with the aim of making it the centrepiece of an Australian Antarctic Museum.
