= Wilson (company) =

Shortsea liner shipping company

Wilson ASA
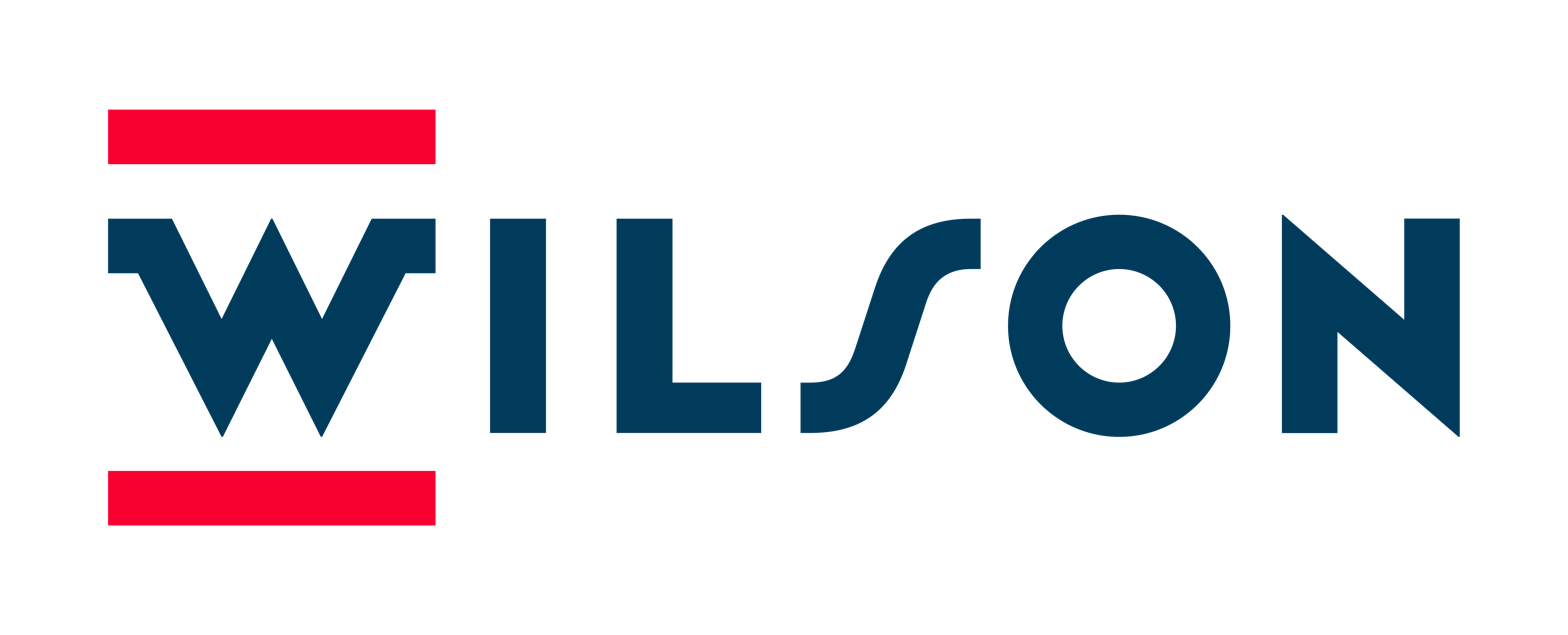

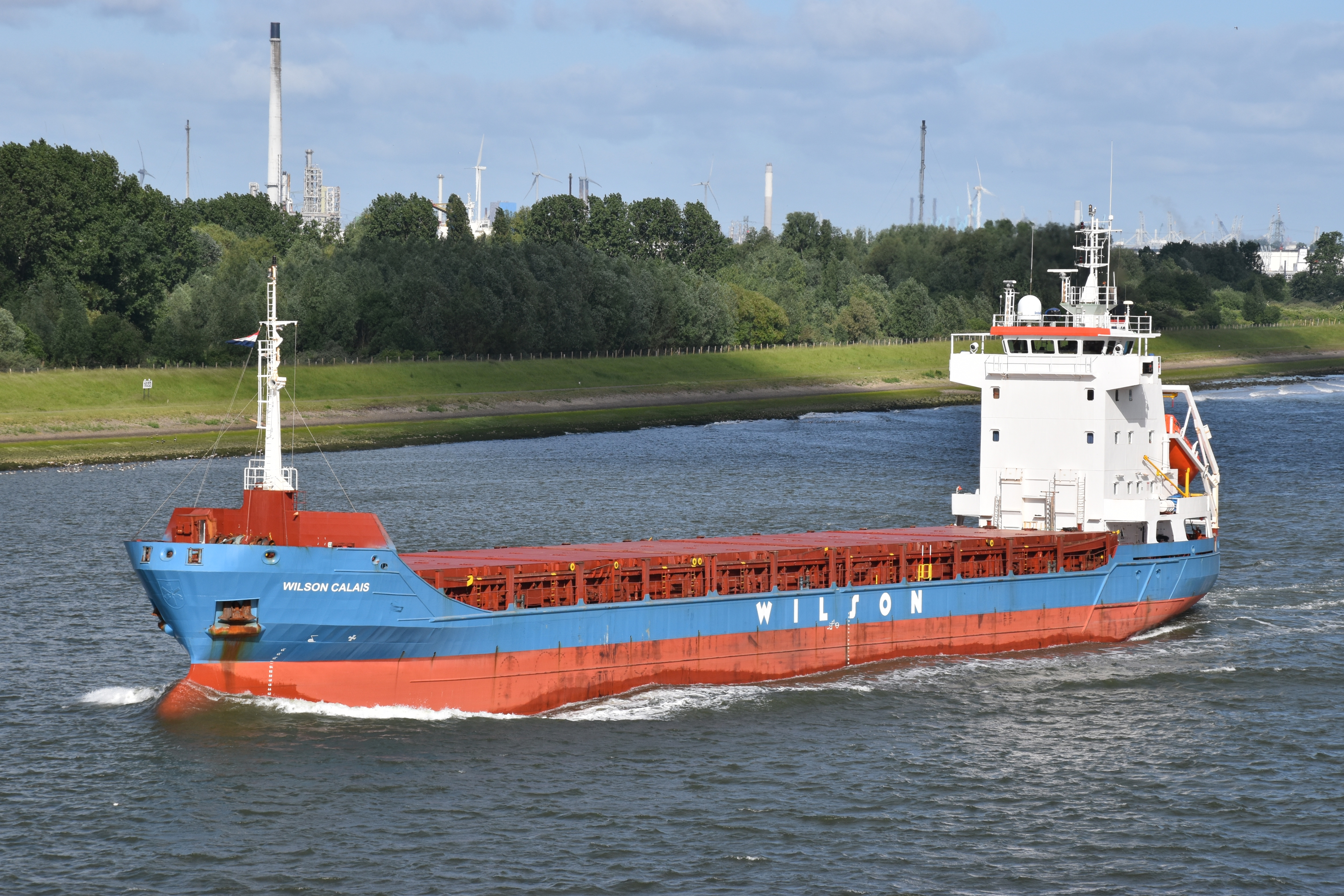
- Company type: Public
- Industry: Shipping
- Founded: 1993; 33 years ago
- Headquarters: Bergen, Norway
- Area served: Europe
- Key people: Øyvind Gjerde (CEO)
- Revenue: ▲NOK 1,658.6 million (2006)
- Operating income: NOK 184.7 million (2006)
- Net income: NOK 120.1 million (2006)
- Website: www.wilsonship.no

Wilson ASA is a shortsea liner shipping company that operates about 100 vessels, of which 64 are owned. The ships are bulk carriers in the range of 1,500 long tons deadweight (DWT) to 10,000 DWT. The company is controlled by Kristian Eidesvik, who owns about 80% of the company. Headquarters are located in Bergen, Norway.

== History ==
Wilson was founded in 1993 after the merger of Paal Wilson & Co (founded 1942) and Jebsens (founded 1929) with the operating company Jebsen Wilson Euro Carriers, as one of the largest short sea shipping companies in the world. The new company was a joint venture still owned by the two mother companies. At the time of the merger Paal Wilson & Co was owned 67% by IPG Shipping while the rest was owned by the Wilson family after Paal Wilson died in 1985. Kristian Eidesvik bought part of the company in 1995, but after internal struggle in Paal Wilson & Co sold their ownership in Euro Carriers to Jebsens, instead gaining control over Actinor Shipping. But the next year Actinor bought 70% of Jebsens, and by 2001 the entire company was owned by In Ship, owned by Eidesvik. Wilson ASA was listed on the Oslo Stock Exchange in 2005.
