= Abrasion resistant steel =

High carbon steel

Abrasion resistant steel is a high-carbon alloy steel that is produced to resist wear and stress. There are several grades of abrasion resistant steel, including AR200, AR235, AR400, AR450, AR500 and AR600.

== Quenching and tempering ==
Abrasion resistant steel undergoes a two-step heat treatment process called quenching and tempering, which alters the steel's grain structure to increase hardness and toughness.

During the quenching phase, the steel is heated to an above-critical temperature and is then rapidly cooled with water. The steel is then re-heated to a below-critical temperature and air cooled, which is the tempering phase.

== Brinell hardness ==
The hardness of abrasion resistant steel is determined by a Brinell hardness test. This test uses a small steel ball to inflict force on a material. The indentation created by the steel ball is then measured and used to calculate Brinell hardness number (BHN).

Average Brinell Hardness Numbers (BHNs) for Abrasion Resistant Steel Grades
Grade	BHN
AR200 & AR235	180-260
AR400	360-440
AR450	430-480
AR500	460-544
AR600	570-625

Standards for Brinell hardness testing are regulated by ASTM International under E10 specifications.

== Applications ==
Abrasion resistant steel is typically used in applications requiring high wear resistance, including backhoe buckets and teeth, bulldozer blades, dump truck beds, ore and coal chutes, augers and aggregate conveyors. Additional uses include shooting targets and armor, AR500 steel is commonly used for these applications as higher BHN steels are more brittle.
