= German trawler V 204 Zieten =

History
- Name: Zieten (1934–45); Astrolabe (1945–54)
- Owner: Hochseefischerei F. A. Pust (1934–39); Kriegsmarine (1939–45); French Navy (1945–48)
- Port of registry: (Nazi Germany) Wesermünde, Germany (1934–39); Kriegsmarine (1939–45); French Navy (1946–48); France (1948–54)
- Builder: Bremer Vulkan
- Yard number: 709
- Launched: 16 October 1934
- Completed: November 1934
- Commissioned: 17 September 1939
- Identification: Code Letters DEAJ (1934–45); Fishing boat registration PG 419 (1934–39); Pennant Number V 213 (1939–45); Pennant Number V 204 (1945); Pennant Number P666 (1947–48)
- Fate: Scrapped 1954

General characteristics
- Type: Fishing trawler (1934–39, 1948–54); Vorpostenboot (1939–45); Blockship (1945); Survey ship (1947–48)
- Tonnage: 437 GRT, 166 NRT
- Displacement: 600 t (590 long tons)
- Length: 50.63 m (166 ft 1 in)
- Beam: 8.19 m (26 ft 10 in)
- Draught: 3.83 m (12 ft 7 in)
- Depth: 4.65 m (15 ft 3 in)
- Installed power: triple-expansion steam engine, 116nhp
- Propulsion: Single-screw propeller
- Speed: 12.5 knots (23.2 km/h; 14.4 mph)

Zieten was a German fishing trawler that was requisitioned by the Kriegsmarine in the Second World War for use as a Vorpostenboot, serving as V 213 Zieten and V 204 Zieten. She was scuttled in January 1945 but was raised later that year and rebuilt as the survey ship Astrolabe. She served with the French Navy 1947–48 and was sold for use as a fishing trawler. In service until 1953, she was scrapped the following year.

== Description ==
Hinrich Hey was 50.63 metres (166 ft 1 in) long, with a beam of 8.19 metres (26 ft 10 in). She had a depth of 4.65 metres (15 ft 3 in) and a draught of 3.83 metres (12 ft 7 in). She was assessed at 422 GRT, 156 NRT. She was powered by a triple expansion steam engine, which had cylinders of 36.0 centimetres (14 3/16 in), 56.0 centimetres (22 1/16 in) and 93 centimetres (36 5/8 in) diameter by 64.9 centimetres (25 9/16 in) stroke. The engine was made by Bremer Vulkan, Vegesack, Germany. It was rated at 116nhp. The engine powered a single screw propeller driven via a low pressure turbine, double reduction gearing and a hydraulic coupling. It could propel the ship at 12.5 knots (23.2 km/h).

== History ==
Zieten was built as yard number 709 by Bremer Vulkan, Vegesack, for the Hochseefischerei F. A. Pust, Wesermünde, Germany. The Code Letters DEAJ and fishing boat registration PG 419 were allocated.

On 17 September 1939, Zieten was requisitioned by the Kriegsmarine for use as a Vorpostenboot. She was allocated to 2 Vorpostenflotille as V 213 Zieten. In January 1945, she was redesignated V 204 Zieten. She was scuttled as a blockship at Nantes, Loire-Inférieure, France later that year. She was later raised and by 1 January 1946 was under rebuild at Cherbourg, Manche, France. She was renamed Astrolabe on 21 January 1947 and arrived at L'Orient, Morbihan on 21 September 1947 for conversion to a survey vessel. The Pennant Number P666 was allocated. On 4 November 1948, she was removed from the Navy List and was returned to service as a fishing trawler. She was condemned on 19 December 1953 and was sold in L'Orient for scrapping in 1954.

== Sources ==
- Gröner, Erich (1993). Die deutschen Kriegsschiffe 1815-1945 (in German). Vol. 8/I: Flußfahrzeuge, Ujäger, Vorpostenboote, Hilfsminensucher, Küstenschutzverbände (Teil 1). Koblenz: Bernard & Graefe. ISBN 3-7637-4807-5.
- Roche, Jean-Michel (2013). Dictionnaire des bâtiments de la flotte de guerre française de Colbert à nos jours [Dictionary of French Warships from Colbert to Today] (in French). Vol. II: 1870–2006 (2nd ed.). France. ISBN 978-2-9525917-3-7. OCLC 165892922.
