= Kristian Eidesvik =

Norwegian businessperson and politician (1945–2024)

- Born: 19 September 1945; Bømlo Municipality, Norway
- Died: 7 August 2024 (aged 78)
- Occupations: Shipowner, real estate investor, politician
- Political party: Progress Party

Kristian Eidesvik (19 September 1945 – 7 August 2024) was a Norwegian shipowner, real estate investor, and politician for the Progress Party.

== Business career ==
Eidesvik started his business career in 1965, when he and his brother invested in a fishing vessel. They continued investing in shipping, offshore and other industries, and real estate. The brothers split their company in 1997, when Kristian took over the shipping company Wilson and other assets. In 2023 Eidesvik was listed as number 107 on the magazine Kapital list of the wealthiest people in Norway, with a fortune of 3.8 billion NOK.

== Political career ==
Eidesvik was elected second deputy representative to the Storting from the constituency of Hordaland for the period 1989–1993, for the Progress Party. He left the party in 1994, after the 1994 Progress Party national convention.

== Personal life and death ==
Eidesvik was born on Bømlo Municipality on 19 September 1945. He died on 7 August 2024, at the age of 78.
