= Ywam Liberty =

French icebreaking research vessel

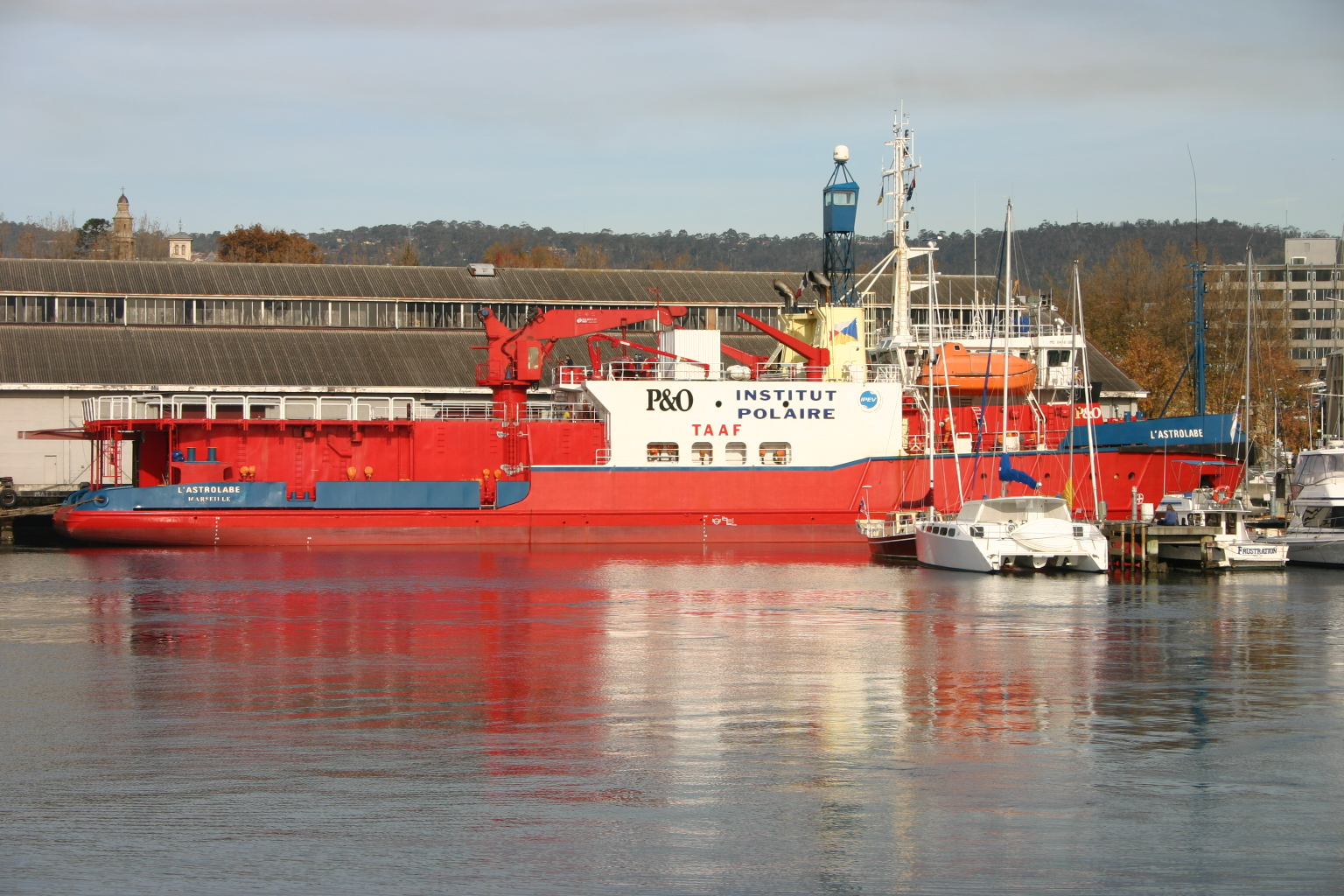
- L'Astrolabe berthed at Franklin Wharf in Hobart, Tasmania

History
- Name: Fort Resolution (1986–1988); Austral Fish (1988); L'Astrolabe (1988–2017); Ywam Liberty (2017–)
- Port of registry: Cook Islands
- Builder: Ferguson-Ailsa, Glasgow, United Kingdom
- Yard number: 567
- Completed: 1 January 1986
- Identification: Call sign E5U3281; IMO number: 8418198; MMSI number: 518100365
- Status: In service

General characteristics
- Tonnage: 1,753 GT; 949 DWT; 525 NT
- Length: 65.5 m (214 ft 11 in)
- Beam: 12.8 m (42 ft 0 in)
- Depth: 5.35 m (17 ft 7 in)
- Ice class: 1A Super
- Installed power: 2 × Mirrlees Blackstone 8MB275 (2 × 2,300 kW)
- Propulsion: Two shafts; controllable pitch propellers; Bow thruster (500 bhp)
- Speed: 14 knots (26 km/h; 16 mph) (max); 12 knots (22 km/h; 14 mph) (economical)
- Capacity: 50 passengers
- Crew: 5 officers, 7 other crew
- Aviation facilities: Helipad

YWAM Liberty is the former L'Astrolabe, a French icebreaking research vessel which was used to supply the Dumont d'Urville research station in Antarctica. The vessel made regular voyages between Hobart and the Dumont D'Urville research station for fifteen years and was replaced by a new icebreaker bearing the same name in 2017.

== History ==
=== 1992 Northeast Passage ===
The vessel has also traversed the Northeast passage. The European Space Agency reports a 1992 traverse "was the first civilian expedition through the NSR since the Russian Revolution." L'Astrolabe was escorted on her transit by Russian icebreakers.

=== 2013 Antarctic Ocean rescue mission ===
L'Astrolabe attempted to reach Akademik Shokalskiy, trapped by an outbreak of old glacial ice in the Antarctic Ocean. L'Astrolabe didn't match Chinese research vessel Xue Long's 6 nautical miles (11 km; 6.9 mi) from the trapped Russian ship, but got closer than the Australian Aurora Australis' 10 nautical miles (19 km; 12 mi). Withdrawing after encountering heavy ice, she subsequently supported further attempts by Xuě Lóng and Aurora Australis to reach Akademik Shokalskiy and rescue her passengers.

=== 2018 Deployment to Bougainville PNG as a Medical Ship ===
From July 2018, YWAM Liberty spent six months in Bougainville, Papua New Guinea providing primary health, dental, optometry and ophthalmic care. The ship is administered by YWAM Ships Kona, from Kailua-Kona in Hawaii.

== Incidents ==
=== 2005 man overboard incident ===
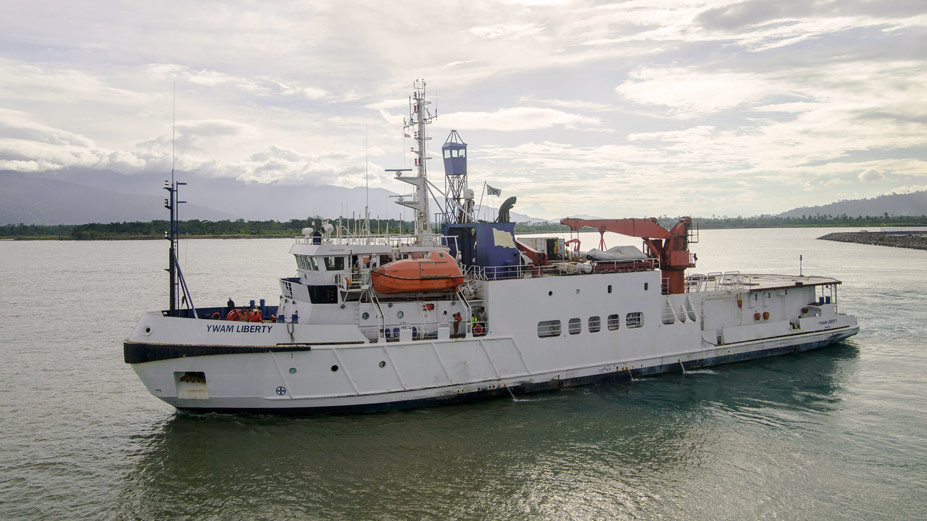
YWAM Liberty in Bougainville PNG July 2018

On January 27, 2005, a crew member was found to have gone overboard. The missing crew member's body was found.

During the recovery of his body the second engineer's hand was seriously injured, and he was at risk of losing his thumb. A report by the Australian Transport Safety Board concluded his injury would have been avoided if the block he was using to recover the ship's boat had been equipped with handholds. The report noted that the deceased crew member was found with a high blood alcohol level. He had been seen to be depressed prior to his death, and the report concluded he had jumped or fallen overboard under the influence of alcohol.

=== 2010 Antarctica helicopter crash ===
On October 28, 2010, a Eurocopter AS350 helicopter which operated between the ship and the Dumont d'Urville Station crashed in bad weather en route to the station. All 4 on board were killed.
