= EasyCinema =

UK cinema operation business (2003–2012)

easyCinema
- Company type: Private
- Industry: Cinema
- Founded: 2003; 23 years ago United Kingdom
- Founder: Sir Stelios Haji-Ioannou
- Defunct: 2012; 14 years ago
- Fate: Handed back to Odeon Cinemas (at The Point, Milton Keynes); Re-branded as LOVEFiLM (online)
- Successor: Odeon Cinemas; LOVEFiLM
- Parent: easyGroup

easyCinema was a cinema operation business in the easyGroup corporation.

== History ==
=== Cinema ===
It opened its first cinema on 23 May 2003 when it took over the cinema facility at The Point, Milton Keynes from United Cinemas International. In line with the yield management model operated by other operations in the easyGroup, it offered screenings from 20p if booked well in advance. The cinema initially struggled as major distributors were not prepared to release new films to the company using this revenue model. First run films later became available, but at fixed prices. The cinema began operations by choosing not to serve popcorn and drinks, to save on staffing costs. The company subsequently reversed this policy.

Towards the end of its life, the cinema site also housed an EasyInternetcafé and was a pick-up point for easyPizza. However, following a dispute over unpaid rent with the landlord, Odeon, which resulted in eviction, the easyCinema closed in May 2006. The closure of the Milton Keynes easyCinema appears to have curtailed the desired expansion into London's West End.

=== DVD rental ===
In March 2005 saw the commencement of EasyCinema Online DVD Rental (stylised as easyCinema), first announced in November 2004. This was a partnership with Video Island, the company operating rental services for several other retail brands. However, unlike many online DVD rental services, there was no monthly subscription and the users purchased rental credits instead.

On 1 August 2012 the easyCinema website and branding ceased and became wholly branded as LOVEFiLM.
