= List of companies of Portugal =

Location of Portugal

Portugal is a country on the Iberian Peninsula in Southwestern Europe. It is the westernmost country of mainland Europe. Portugal is a developed country with a high-income advanced economy and a high living standard. It is the 5th most peaceful country in the world, maintaining a unitary semi-presidential republican form of government. It has the 18th highest Social Progress in the world, putting it ahead of other Western European countries like France, Spain and Italy. A founding member of NATO and the Community of Portuguese Language Countries, it is also a member of numerous other international organizations, including the United Nations, the European Union, the eurozone, and the OECD.

For further information on the types of business entities in this country and their abbreviations, see "Business entities in Portugal".

== Notable firms ==
This list includes notable companies with primary headquarters located in the country. The industry and sector follow the Industry Classification Benchmark taxonomy. Organizations which have ceased operations are included and noted as defunct.

Notable companies Status: P=Private, S=State; A=Active, D=Defunct
Name	Industry	Sector	Headquarters	Founded	Notes	Status	
Altri	Basic materials	Paper	Porto	2005	Paper	P	A
Ambar – Ideas on Paper S.A.	Industrials	Industrial suppliers	Porto	1939	Office supplies	P	A
Banco Comercial Português	Financials	Banks	Porto	1985	Bank	P	A
Bial	Health care	Pharmaceuticals	Trofa	1924	Pharma	P	A
Caixa Geral de Depósitos	Financials	Banks	Lisbon	1876	State bank	S	A
Central de Cervejas	Consumer goods	Brewers	Vila Franca de Xira	1934	Brewery	P	A
Chipidea	Technology	Semiconductors	Oeiras	1997	Semiconductor, defunct 2009	P	D
Churchill's Port	Wine making	Port wine	Porto	1981	Port wine	P	A
Cimpor	Industrials	Building materials & fixtures	Lisbon	1976	Cement, owned by Mover Participações	P	A
Cofina	Consumer services	Publishing	Porto	1856	Publisher	P	A
Comboios de Portugal	Consumer services	Travel & tourism	Lisbon	1856	Passenger rail	S	A
Conservas Ramirez	Consumer goods	Food products	Matosinhos	1853	Fish & Cannedfish	P	A
Corporação Industrial do Norte	Basic materials	Specialty chemicals	Maia	1926	Chemicals, paints, coatings	P	A
Corticeira Amorim	Basic materials	Industrial suppliers	Santa Maria da Feira	1870	Cork	P	A
Critical Software	Technology	Software	Coimbra	1998	Software	P	A
CTT Correios de Portugal, S.A. (CTT)	Industrials	Delivery services	Lisbon	1520	Postal services	P	A
Delta Cafés	Consumer goods	Food products	Campo Maior	1961	Coffee	P	A
EFACEC	Industrials	Electronic equipment	Matosinhos	1948	Electronics	P	A
Energias de Portugal (EDP)	Utilities	Conventional electricity	Lisbon	1976	Electrical generation	P	A
Fábrica Nacional de Munições de Armas Ligeiras	Industrials	Defense	Lisbon	1947	Arms	P	D
Galp Energia	Utilities	Gas distribution	Lisbon	1999	Natural gas distribution	P	A
Glintt	Technology	Software	Lisbon	2008	Software developer	P	A
Grupo José de Mello	Conglomerates	-	Lisbon	1986	Health care, energy, logistics	P	A
Iberomoldes	Industrials	General industries	Marinha Grande	1975	Engineering	P	A
Impresa	Consumer services	Media	Oeiras	1972	Television, publisher	P	A
Jerónimo Martins	Consumer services	Retail	Lisbon	1792	Food retail	P	A
Lactogal	Consumer goods	Food & beverage	Porto	1996	Dairy, water	P	A
Logoplaste	Industrials	Diversified industrials	Cascais	1976	Plastic	P	A
Martifer	Industrials	Heavy construction	Oliveira de Frades	1990	Construction	P	A
Media Capital	Consumer services	Broadcasting & entertainment	Oeiras	1988	Media distribution	P	A
MEO	Telecommunications	Mobile telecommunications	Lisbon	1991	Mobile provider	P	A
Montepio	Financials	Banks	Lisbon	1840	Bank	P	A
Mota-Engil	Industrials	General industries	Porto	1946	Engineering and infrastructure	P	A
Move Interactive	Technology	Software	Cascais	2008	Video games	P	A
NOS	Telecommunications	Fixed line telecommunications	Lisbon	1994	Telecom	P	A
Novo Banco	Financials	Banks	Lisbon	2014	Bank	P	A
Pingo Doce	Consumer services	Food retailers & wholesalers	Lisbon	1980	Supermarket chain	P	A
Porto Editora	Consumer services	Publishing	Porto	1944	Publisher	P	A
Portugal Telecom	Telecommunications	Fixed line telecommunications	Lisbon	1994	Telecommunications, part of Altice (Netherlands)	P	A
Quidgest	Technology	Software	Lisbon	1988	Specialist enterprise software	P	A
Rádio e Televisão de Portugal	Consumer services	Broadcasting & entertainment	Lisbon	1935	State media	S	A
Redes Energéticas Nacionais (REN)	Utilities	Conventional electricity	Lisbon	1994	Electrical distribution	P	A
Renova	Basic materials	Paper	Torres Novas	1939	Paper	P	A
Salvador Caetano	Consumer goods	Commercial vehicles	Vila Nova de Gaia	1946	Buses and trucks	P	A
Semapa	Industrials	Building materials & fixtures	Lisbon	1991	Cement, paper	P	A
Simoldes	Industrials	Diversified industrials	Oliveira de Azeméis	1959	Manufacturing	P	A
Soares da Costa	Industrials	Heavy construction	Porto	1918	Construction	P	A
SIC	Consumer services	Broadcasting & entertainment	Lisbon	1992	Television, part of Impresa	P	A
Sonae	Conglomerates	-	Maia	1959	Retail, financials, industrials, telecom	P	A
Sovena Group	Consumer goods	Farming & fishing	Oeiras	1956	Agribusiness	P	A
Sumol + Compal	Consumer goods	Food products	Oeiras	2008	Food and beverage, merger of Sumolis and Compal	P	A
Teixeira Duarte	Conglomerates	-	Oeiras	1921	Construction, distribution, automotive	P	A
Tabaqueira	Consumer goods	Tobacco	Lisbon	1927	Cigarettes, part of Philip Morris International (US)	P	A
TAP Air Portugal	Consumer services	Airlines	Lisbon	1945	Airline	P	A
Tekever	Industrials	Aerospace & defense	Lisbon	2001	UAV, electronics, security	P	A
Televisão Independente	Consumer services	Broadcasting & entertainment	Oeiras	1993	Broadcaster	P	A
The Navigator Company	Basic materials	Paper	Setúbal	2001	Paper	P	A
Tranquilidade	Financials	Full line insurance	Lisbon	1871	Insurance, owned by Assicurazioni Generali	P	A
Tupam editores	Consumer services	Publishing	Lisbon	1977	Health publisher	P	A
UMM	Industrials	Diversified industrials	Lisbon	1977	Metal works	P	A
Unicer Brewery	Consumer goods	Brewers	Matosinhos	1890	Brewery	P	A
Uniplaces	Technology	Internet	Lisbon	2012	Student accommodation platform, travel, real estate	P	A
Visabeira	Conglomerates	-	Viseu	1980	Telecommunications, travel, industrials, real estate	P	A
Vista Alegre	Consumer goods	Durable household products	Ílhavo	1824	Porcelain	P	A

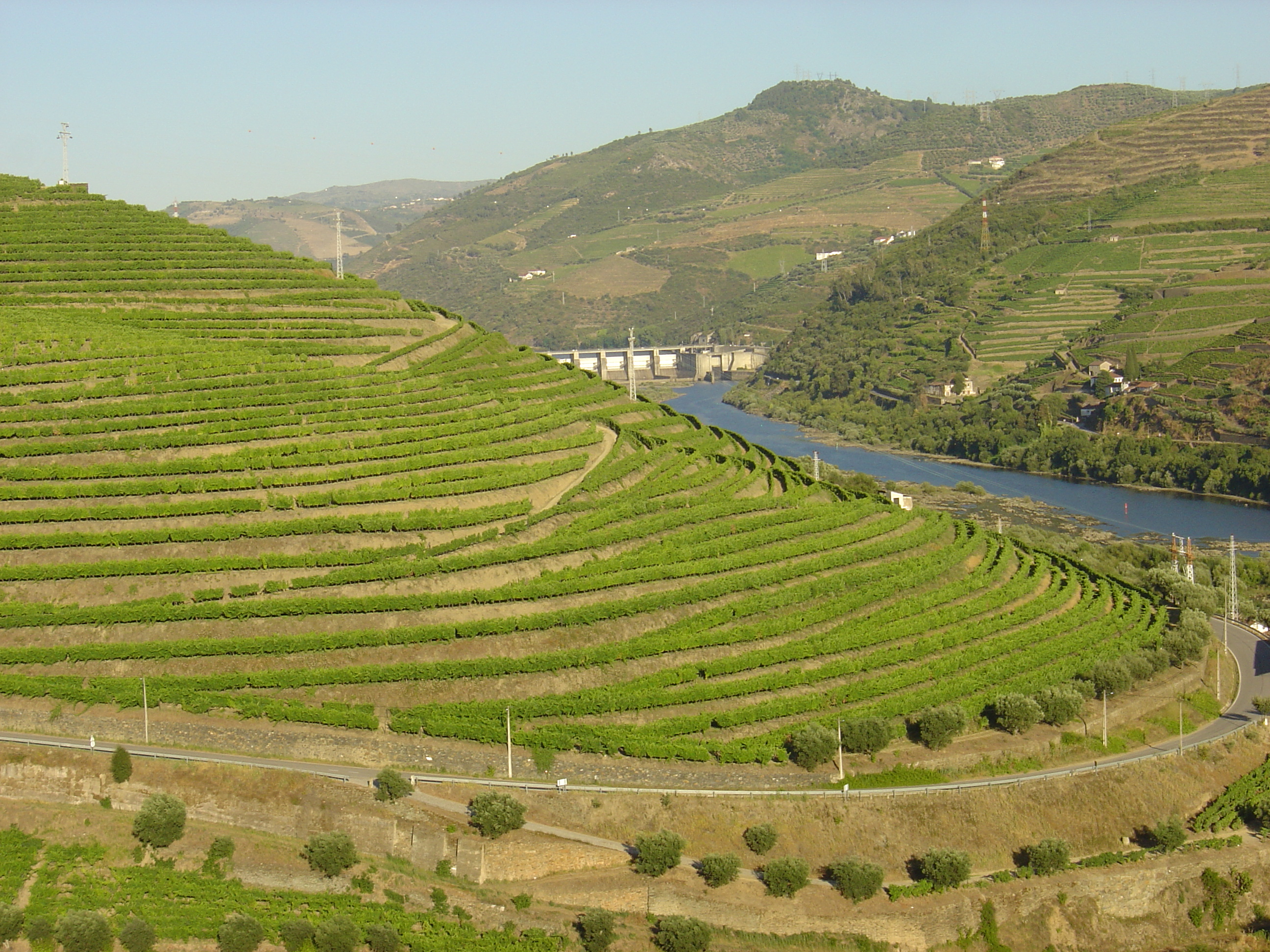
Vineyards in the Douro Valley.

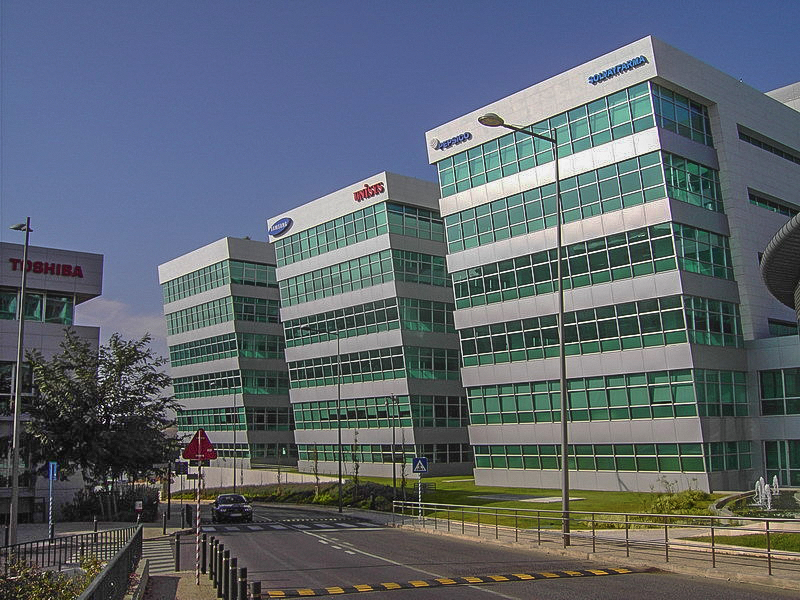
Oeiras Municipality, in the Lisbon metropolitan area.

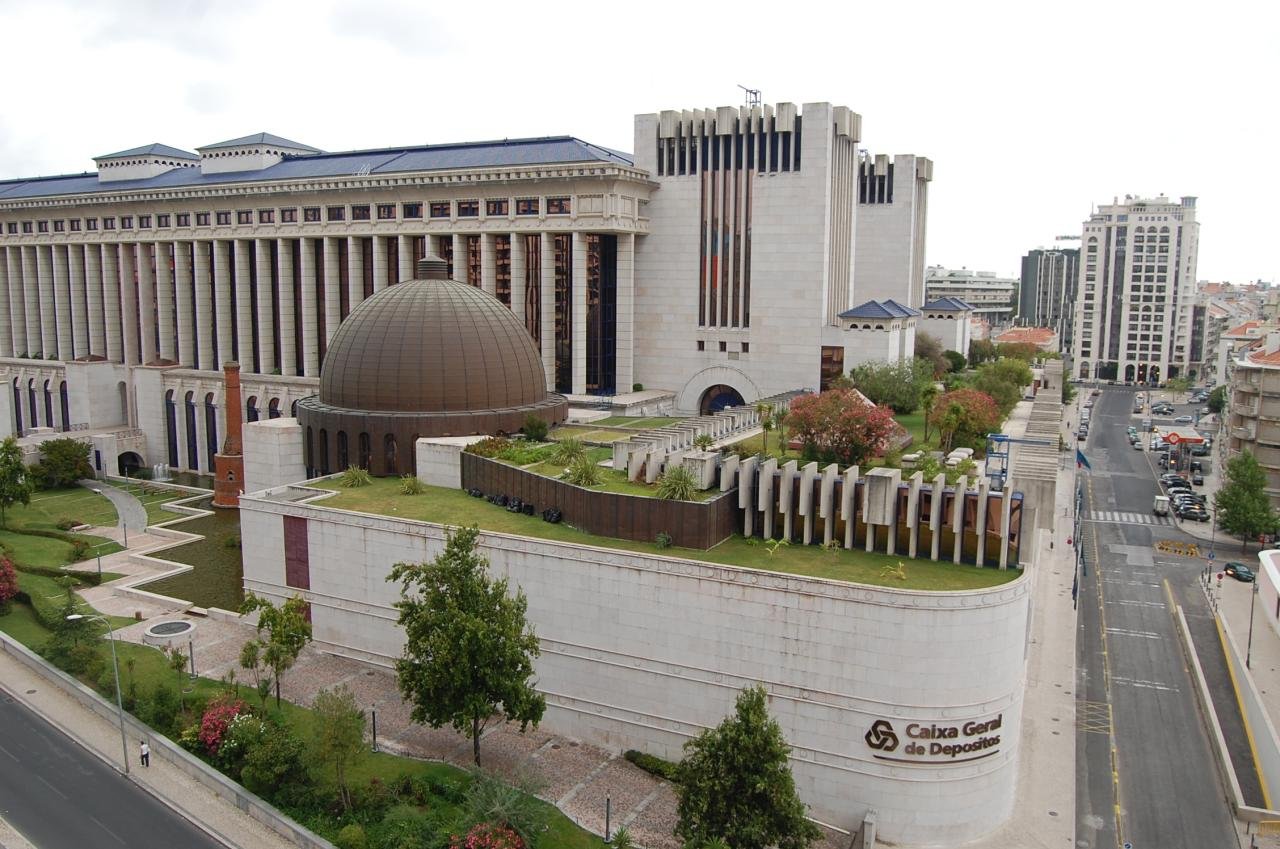
Headquarters of the Caixa Geral de Depósitos bank.

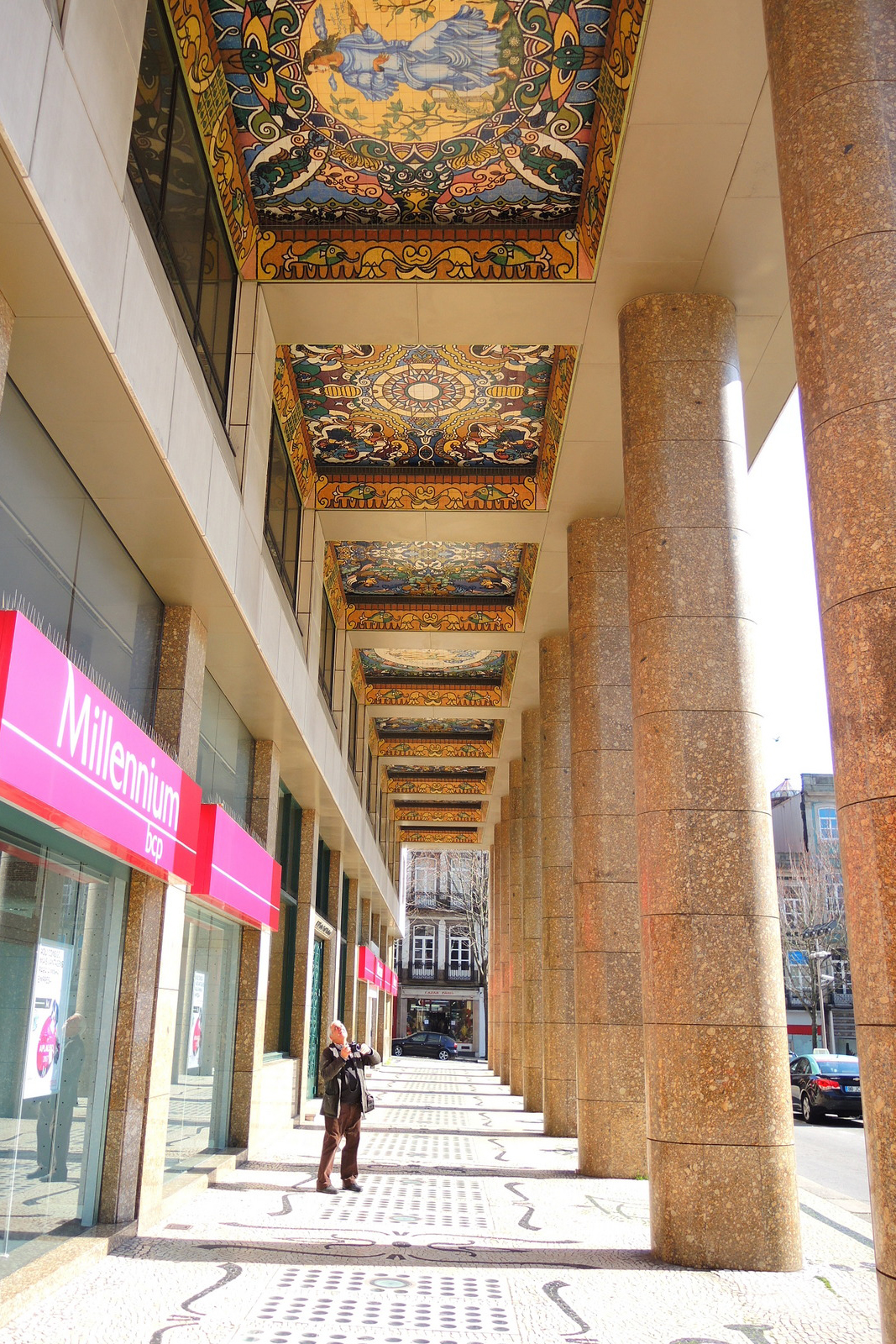
Seat of the Banco Comercial Português.

== See also ==
- List of airlines of Portugal
- List of supermarket chains in Portugal
