= EasySim =

easySim.global
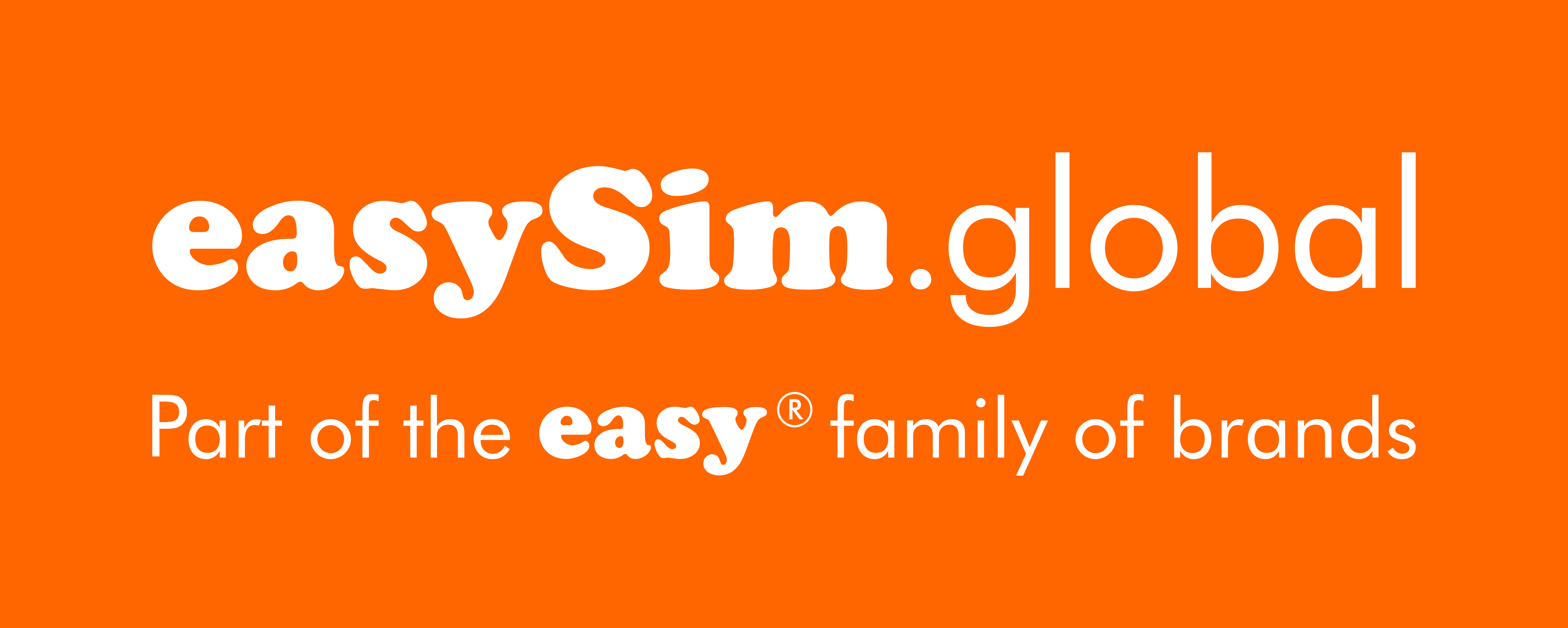
- Company type: Private
- Industry: Telecommunications
- Founded: 2023
- Founder: Sir Stelios Haji-Ioannou; Jim Guest; Richard Gwilliam
- Headquarters: Portsmouth, United Kingdom
- Area served: Worldwide
- Key people: Jim Guest; Richard Gwilliam
- Products: eSIM data services
- Website: easysim.global

EasySim (styled as easySim.global) is a British telecommunications company that provides digital eSIM data connectivity and prepaid mobile data plans for international travellers. The service allows users to activate and manage mobile data across multiple countries without replacing a physical SIM card. Founded in 2023, the company is part of the “easy” family of brands created by entrepreneur Sir Stelios Haji-Ioannou, whose other ventures include easyJet and easyHotel. It focuses on offering digital alternatives to traditional mobile roaming services.

== History ==
The company was founded in 2023 and is headquartered in Portsmouth, United Kingdom. Its directors are Jim Guest and Richard Gwilliam. easySim.global operates under the “easy” brand umbrella, which includes other companies licensed by easyGroup.

== Products and services ==
easySim.global offers prepaid eSIM data plans designed for both short-term and long-term travel. The service includes coverage in more than 150 countries, prepaid pricing models, and digital activation through the company’s online platform.

== Developments ==
In 2024, easySim.global announced a partnership with Verizon to expand 5G coverage in the United States. Later in the same year, it integrated its service platform with eSIM Go. In August 2024, the company reported a data breach affecting customer information.

== See also ==
- List of mobile virtual network operators in the United Kingdom
