= EasyMoney =

UK-based bank and financial services company

E-Money Capital Ltd
- Trade name: easyMoney
- Formerly: Blue Sky Capital Limited (2003–2004); Einstein Asset Management (UK) Limited (2004–2006); Network Einstein (UK) Limited (2006–2008); G I G Capital Limited (2008–2012); De Candole Fry Limited (2012–2016)
- Company type: Private limited company
- Industry: Banking, Financial services
- Founded: 21 August 2001
- Founder: Sir Stelios Haji-Ioannou
- Headquarters: London, England, UK
- Services: Retail banking SME banking
- Owner: Andrew De Candole
- Website: easymoney.com

E-Money Capital Ltd, trading as easyMoney, is a financial intermediary services brand in the United Kingdom established in 2001 as a division of Sir Stelios Haji-Ioannou's easyGroup and since 2018 has been owned by Andrew De Candole.

== History ==
On 21 August 2001 the credit card company easyMoney was set up by easyGroup with Accucard (now part of Lloyds Bank), which was expanded on 14 February 2005 with the announcement that unbundled car insurance products provided by Zurich would be sold later in the year as easyMoney Insurance. In April 2006, easyGroup linked with Moneysupermarket.com to provide a financial product comparison website.

In February 2018, easyMoney was relaunched under new ownership by the property developer Andrew De Candole as a peer-to-peer lending company, as a result of taking over the property lending business Tower Bridging, built by industry professional Jason Ferrando. It started providing savers with an option to earn higher interest than the high street banks by lending their money to property professionals. This followed the UK government's move in April 2016 to allow peer-to-peer lending products to be held in a new tax-free Individual Savings Account (ISA) wrapper called an "Innovative finance ISA".

easyMoney decided to stay open to retail investors during the COVID-19 pandemic, which its head of lending, Jason Ferrando, later described as "the best thing". Accordingly, in May 2021, easyMoney began offering 3.67% interest on a minimum investment of £100, whilst it offered 8% interest on a minimum investment of £1 million.

easyMoney revealed in February 2022 that it had lent more than £150 million over four years and had returned £10 million in interest to investors since the platform opened in February 2018. In May 2022, easyMoney confirmed that it had doubled its profits and revenues between 2020 and 2021, the second year in a row it had been in profit.

== See also ==
- List of banks in the United Kingdom
