= EasyFoodstore =

British discount supermarket

easyFoodstore
- Type: Privately held company
- Industry: Retail
- Founded: 2016; 10 years ago
- Defunct: May 2021
- Headquarters: London, England
- Number of locations: 1 (closed)
- Key people: Stelios Haji-Ioannou
- Products: Groceries
- Parent: easyGroup
- Website: easyfoodstore.com

easyFoodstore was a discount supermarket owned and operated by the easyGroup in London, England.

== History ==
First announced by easyGroup in 2013, the easyFoodstore supermarket opened in London in February 2016, located next to easyBus House (the headquarters of easyBus Ltd).

The store had no item brands, and only had about 100 items such as tinned goods, pasta, rice, and cleaning products. The supermarket charged just 25p for essential food items. Just days after opening its doors, it was forced to shut temporarily after running out of stock. The store then sold items at 50p each, with 25p returning during promotional periods only.

By late 2021, the sole trial store closed.

== See also ==
- List of supermarket chains in the United Kingdom
