= EasyCar =

British rental car company

easyCar
- Company type: Private
- Industry: Rental and leasing services
- Founded: 2000
- Founder: Sir Stelios Haji-Ioannou
- Headquarters: United Kingdom
- Key people: Sir Stelios Haji-Ioannou
- Services: Car and truck rentals
- Website: www.easycar.com

easyCar (formerly easyRentaCar) is a British-based car brokerage firm. It was founded by Sir Stelios Haji-Ioannou in 2000 and undertakes car rental services. It is a majority owned subsidiary of easyGroup.

== History ==
In April 2000 easyGroup set up the company with the only rental car available being the Mercedes-Benz A-Class.

easyCar Club was launched by easyCar in February 2014 as a peer-to-peer rental scheme that allows members to rent under-used private cars from one another. On 1 December 2018, easyCar Club stopped accepting bookings citing a problem reaching an agreement with an insurer. On 18 December 2018, easyCar Club informed members that it was ceasing operations to join forces with Turo, and offering incentives for easyCar Club members to join Turo.
