= EasyPizza =

Pizza delivery franchise

- Company type: Subsidiary
- Industry: Food and Beverage
- Genre: Franchise
- Founded: 2004; 22 years ago
- Founder: Stelios Haji-Ioannou
- Headquarters: London, UK
- Services: Internet portal
- Parent: easyGroup

EasyPizza (styled as easyPizza) was a short-lived pizza delivery franchise launched on 17 December 2004, owned by EasyGroup.

== Overview ==
easyPizza offered a restricted menu and prices that varied according to demand. Cheaper pizzas were offered during off-peak periods and could command a premium during popular times. Additional discounts were obtained by ordering in advance rather than for immediate delivery. The pizzas were not freshly made but manufactured centrally then cooked from frozen, limiting customisation.

== History ==
EasyGroup lost a High Court case against EasyPizza, a previously existing London-based pizza delivery chain who successfully accused EasyGroup of bullying and underhanded practices.

As of 2017, the only option offered through the easypizza.com site was a re-direct to Domino's Pizza's website. Previously easyPizza had slated Domino's as a "big pizza rip-off". In March 2018 a separate website, easy.pizza was registered to People's Pizza Ltd; this is linked to People's Coffee Ltd, licensee of the easyCoffee marque. easyPizza and easyCoffee vending machines were displayed together a franchise exhibition in October 2018 suggesting plans to revive the pizza brand.
