= Cyprus Marine Environment Protection Association =

The Cyprus Marine Environment Protection Association was created by the International Shipping Community of Cyprus with the support of the Commercial Community of the island led by Sir Stelios Haji-Ioannou. It is an autonomous, nonprofit organization funded solely by its members.

It was officially registered on 27 August 1992 as a not-for-profit organization limited by guarantee. A Caretaker Board of Directors has guided its Official Launching Ceremony and First Annual General Meeting that took place on Sunday, 3 October 1993.

CYMEPA was largely influenced by its Greek equivalent, HELMEPA.
