= Alex Chesterman =

British internet entrepreneur (born 1970)

Alexander Edward Chesterman OBE (born 9 January 1970) is a British Internet entrepreneur. He is co-founder of ScreenSelect, and is the founder and former CEO of online used car platform Cazoo.

== Career ==
Chesterman was the executive vice president of Planet Hollywood until 1998. He founded ScreenSelect (later LoveFilm), which was subsequently sold to Amazon for £200 million.

In 2007, he founded Zoopla, a property website. In June 2014, he floated Zoopla, which was later renamed to ZPG, on the London Stock Exchange for nearly £1bn. In 2018, ZPG was sold to US private equity group Silver Lake for £2.2bn. He was chief executive officer until the end of September 2018, when he stepped down but remained on the board.

He is considered to be one of the UK's most active tech angel investors and mentors. He has backed early stage digital startups, including: Farewill, Graze, Secret Escapes, SportPursuit, UniPlaces, CarWow, Swoon, and Farmdrop. He was named Ernst & Young Entrepreneur of the Year in 2013. He was awarded an OBE for services to digital entrepreneurship in 2016. In 2017, Chesterman was named on Debrett's 500.

In December 2018, Chesterman announced a funding round of over £30m for his next venture, Cazoo. He then went on to raise another round of £50m pre-launch for Cazoo. As of 2020, he raised a total of £180m for Cazoo.

In 2021, Chesterman led investment rounds in checking and digital onboarding platform Thirdfort and DIY and refurbishment platform Lick.

Chesterman stepped aside as Cazoo's chief executive in January 2023 and left the company the following December. Five months later, in May 2024, Cazoo collapsed into administration.

Following his departure from Cazoo, Chesterman focused on angel investing, backing early-stage UK technology startups.

== Personal life ==
Chesterman attended St Paul's School, London and has a bachelor's degree in economics from University College London. He is married and has two sons.

In July 2016, Chesterman was said to be behind a legal challenge to stop Brexit should the British government not allow Parliament to vote on the deal. He donated £300,000 to the Liberal Democrats in the 2019 United Kingdom general election.

In 2021, his net worth was estimated by the Sunday Times Rich List as £750 million.
