= Stelios Philanthropic Foundation =

Charitable organisation

- Type: Private Charitable Foundation
- Industry: Charitable Organisation
- Founded: 2011
- Founder: Stelios Haji-Ioannou
- Headquarters: London
- Area served: UK, Ireland, France, Monaco, Greece, Cyprus
- Key people: Tracy Ghori, UK Co-ordinator
- Website: stelios.org

The Stelios Philanthropic Foundation is the charitable foundation established by Sir Stelios Haji-Ioannou, the founder of EasyJet and the creator of the easy family of brands. The Foundation supports a diverse range of charitable activities, primarily in the places where Stelios and his family have lived and worked – the UK, Ireland, France, Monaco, Greece and Cyprus.

== History ==
The Foundation was formally established in 2011, following previous philanthropic activities like the Stelios scholarships which began in 2006 and the Disabled Entrepreneur awards which began in 2007. Other award programmes funded by the Foundation include: The Young Entrepreneur Awards the North-South Business Co-Operation awards, the Monaco and Riviera young entrepreneur awards and projects to reconcile differences between Greek-Cypriots and Turkish-Cypriots in the country of Stelios' birth. In March 2026, the Foundation made a donation of €10 million to provide an incentive for doctors to work in 47 of Greece's small islands. In the financial year ended 30 September 2025 the Foundation's total income was £14.38 million.

== North-South Business Co-operation Awards ==
The awards were created in 2025 by Sir Stelios Haji-Ioannou to recognise and foster co-operation between entrepreneurs operating in the North and South of the island of Ireland. In 2026 a total of €500,000 was awarded at a ceremony held at Castle Leslie in County Monaghan with Belfast watchmaker Nomadic watches taking home the top prize of €150,000 The business was selected in part due to its efforts to work across the border with a Nomadic location set to open in Dublin.
