= Ferqui Soroco =

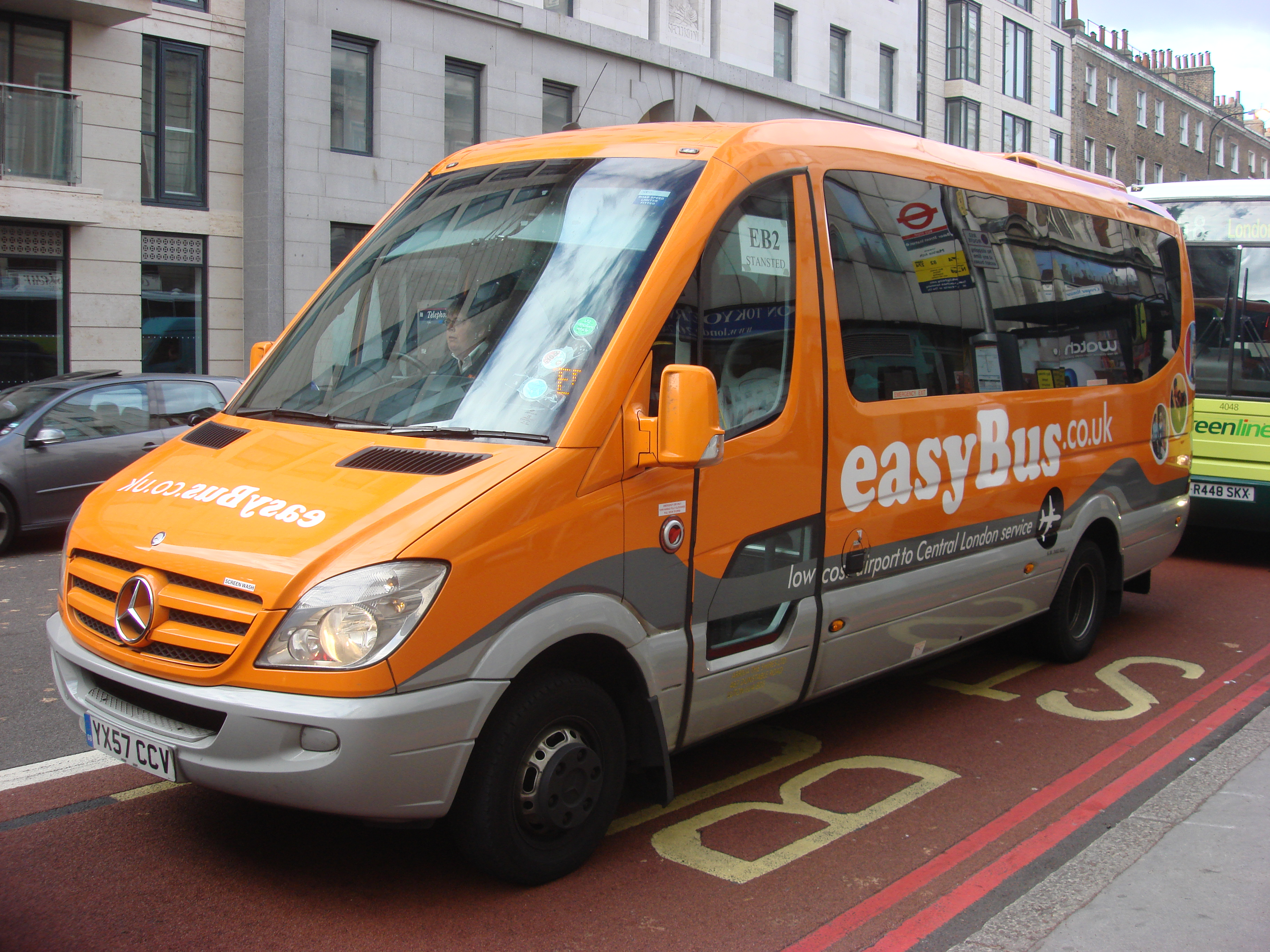
- easyBus Optare Soroco^{+}

Overview
- Manufacturer: Ferqui
- Production: 2000–

Body and chassis
- Body style: Minicoach
- Layout: FR
- Platform: Mercedes-Benz Sprinter

Powertrain
- Capacity: 16–22 seated

Dimensions
- Length: 7.64 metres

Chronology
- Predecessor: Optare Bonito (UK)
- Successor: Optare Bonito 2 (UK)

The Ferqui Soroco (sold as the Optare Soroco in the United Kingdom between 2000 and 2012) is a minibus and minicoach bodywork produced by Spanish manufacturer Ferqui on Mercedes-Benz Sprinter van chassis since 2000. The updated Soroco^{+}, on facelifted Mercedes-Benz Sprinter chassis, was launched in 2008.

The Soroco was originally sold in the United Kingdom as an Optare-badged product due to a dealership agreement between Ferqui and Optare. The Soroco was subsequently withdrawn for sale from the British market at the start of 2012 as Optare terminated the agreement in favour of pursuing their own developments, resulting in the second-generation Optare Bonito.

By 2014, the Soroco, now badged as a Ferqui product and available exclusively as a luxury midicoach, had been reintroduced to the United Kingdom market through a new dealership arrangement with Connaught PSV. The longer-wheelbase Soroco DL was launched in September 2015. As of 2018, Ferqui sells around 35 Sorocos to the British minicoach market annually, with an updated version of the Soroco planned to be launched on the new Mercedes-Benz Sprinter chassis by the end of 2018.

== See also ==
- List of buses
