= Uniplaces =

Student accommodation marketplace

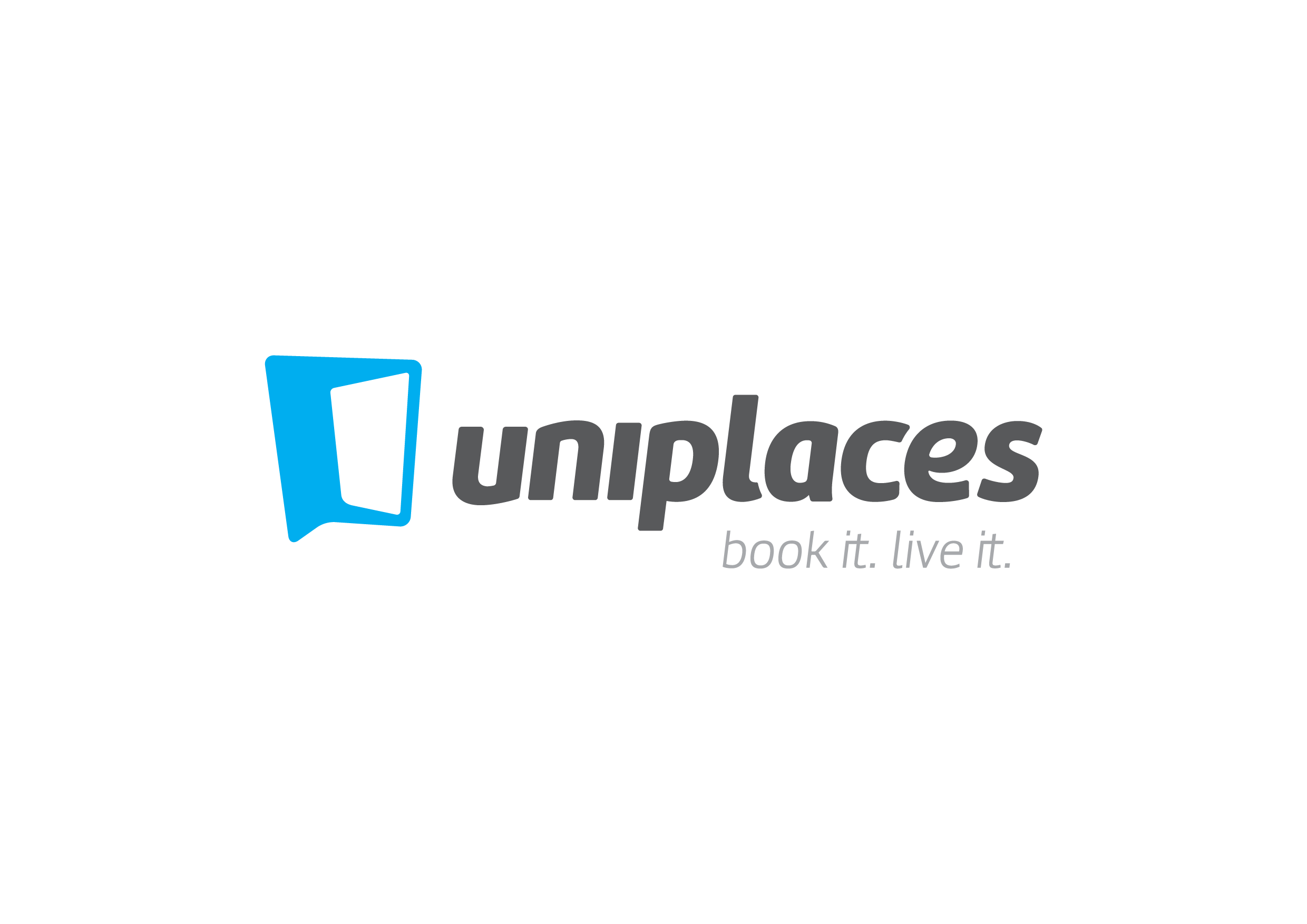
- Website type: Marketplaces, Real Estate
- Available in: English, Portuguese, Spanish, French, German, Italian, Simplified Chinese
- Website: www.uniplaces.com
- Commercial: Yes
- Launched: 2012
- Current status: Active

Uniplaces is an online marketplace for booking student accommodation. Based in Lisbon, the platform was founded in 2012 by Miguel Amaro, Mariano Kostelec and Ben Grech. As of October 2015, students from over 140 countries have booked with Uniplaces for a total of more than 500,000 nights.

== Etymology ==
The platform’s name is derived from “university” and “places”, abbreviated to “Uniplaces”.

== History ==
Uniplaces was founded in 2012 by Miguel Amaro, from Portugal, Ben Grech, from England, and Mariano Kostelec, from Argentina, having its headquarters in Lisbon and an office in London.

The three co-founders met at the University of Nottingham and at King's College London, and first came up with the concept in the Summer of 2011. In November 2011, they participated in Lisbon’s Startup Weekend and created the first version of the platform.

By the beginning of 2012, after a positive response, the trio built a fully working version of the website and secured several partnerships with universities in Portugal.

After having hired a new Head of Design in 2014, Uniplaces unveiled its new website on 7 March 2015, featuring an entirely redesigned branding and logo.

In May 2015, Martin Reiter, former VP at Airbnb, joined Uniplaces as an investor and advisor to help the company expand internationally. 2015 also marked the launch of the Uniplaces Scholarship and the Uniplaces Guarantee, as well as a partnership with Google.

=== International expansion ===
2013 marked the company’s expansion to Porto and London, and later on, in May 2014, to Madrid. After raising its third investment round, in October 2014, Uniplaces rapidly expanded to 39 cities in 8 countries across Europe by April 2015.

== Investment ==
Uniplaces completed a €200k seed round from a group of top European investors in July 2012. Included in the deal were Portugal’s top angel fund Shilling Capital Partners as well as Alex Chesterman one of the UK’s most successful internet entrepreneurs, having founded Zoopla.co.uk and LOVEFiLM.com, and William Reeve who co-founded LOVEFiLM.com.

Uniplaces secured a second seed round in 2013, bringing in a further investment of €1M by British VCs (and Octopus Holdings Limited subsidiary) Octopus Investments.

In October 2014, Uniplaces completed its first Series A round, raising €3M from its previous investors, as well as former Managing Director at Barclays Capital, Rob McClatchey.

On 3 November 2015, during Web Summit, Uniplaces announced a €22M Series A round at Google HQ, in Dublin. This round was led by Atomico, and counted with previous investors Octopus Investments and Shilling Capital Partners.

== Website ==
The site launched with university specific search, allowing students to search properties directly suitable for their university. It is currently free for landlords and real estate agencies to add any property listings and it’s also completely free for the students to search for accommodation. Once a booking is accepted, Uniplaces charges the property manager a commission over the total contract value, and a service fee to the student.

== Customised accommodations portals for universities ==
Uniplaces offers customised accommodation portals to their university partners, which they promote directly to their students. These partnerships are supported by exclusive, 4 year promotional agreements.

== Competitive landscape ==
Include classified advertising like OLX, real estate platforms, national property portals, Erasmus portals, flat share portals and hotels that offer long-term stays. Vacation rental sites like Airbnb and Wimdu offer alternatives to traditional accommodations by allowing people to rent private apartments, but tend to focus more on short-term.

== Criticism ==
Uniplaces has been criticized for its guerilla marketing tactic which included posting links to offers on uniplaces.com in many Facebook groups dealing with apartment offers in Germany.
