= The Point, Milton Keynes =

Former entertainment complex in England

Coordinates: 52.0415°N 0.7556°W

The Point
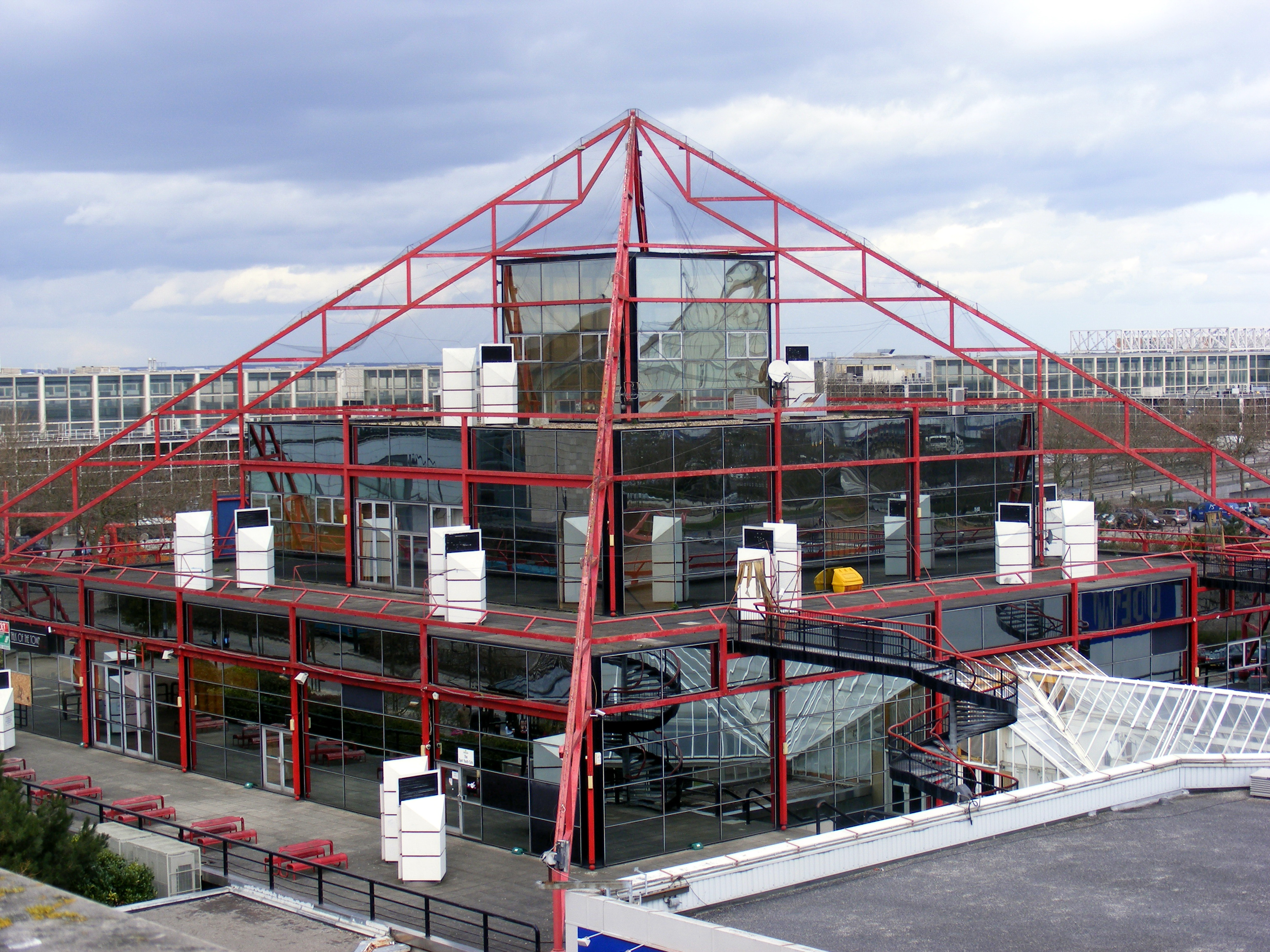

General information
- Type: Mixed used leisure and (former) cinema
- Location: Midsummer Boulevard, Milton Keynes, England, UK
- Current tenants: none
- Opened: 23 November 1985
- Owner: Hammerson

Design and construction
- Architecture firm: Building Design Partnership

The Point is an entertainment complex in Central Milton Keynes, Buckinghamshire, England. When it opened in 1985, it was called the UK's first multiplex cinema although the UK had introduced multi-screen cinemas in 1930 and had been increasing the number of screens in cinemas ever since. The front part of the building has a distinctive mirrored glass ziggurat shape, framed by external steel beams at each corner, joined at the apex. Originally the beams had red neon lights connecting the apexes at each side, so that it looked like a pyramid at night.

In May 2012, the building's owners Hammerson announced proposals to demolish the building and replace it with a retail-based development. On 6 March 2014, Milton Keynes Council voted to approve the application. On 26 February 2015, the Odeon cinema to the rear of the building closed, in preparation for the demolition. Historic England had refused to recommend the building for listed status.

== Facilities ==
As of November 2022, the Point houses:

- Willen Hospice Clearance Outlet - selling donated items with all proceeds going to the Willen Hospice, located in the former Buzz Bingo hall
- Off The Record - music shop selling donated CDs and vinyls, with all proceeds going to the Willen Hospice, located in the former restaurant area
- ReturnMK - local charity providing funded and subsidised activities for young people
- The Point Kiosk

The Point previously housed:

- Odeon cinema (closed 26 February 2015, moved to MK1 Shopping & Leisure Park in Denbigh)
- Buzz Bingo (located underneath, closed 20 March 2020 due to UK Government restrictions linked to the COVID-19 pandemic, announced on 15 July 2020 that it will not reopen)
- The Fresh Pizza Company (first opened as Deep Pan Pizza Co in 1995, closed in 2007)
- Nexus (first opened as Oasis Bar, closed in 2007)

The Point cinema was also previously operated by the following companies:

- AMC Theatres (1985–1989)
- UCI (1989–2003)
- EasyGroup's easyCinema (2003–2006, building was leased on agreement with UCI, who continued to serve as landlords)

Gala Bingo previously operated the bingo hall until September 2018, when its UK bingo hall arm was rebranded as Buzz Bingo.

== History ==
In the 1980s, cinema audiences were in decline nationally, due among other reasons to high ticket prices, TV channels and video recorders. Smaller cinemas were closing down as they were no longer economic to operate.

The Point opened in 1985 and included a 10-screen multiplex cinema, referred to as the UK's first multiplex, although the UK had introduced multi-screen cinemas in 1930. The first company to run the cinema was AMC Theatres in conjunction with Milton Keynes Entertainment Corporation (MKEC). The venue was an instant success and its opening caused, at least partially, the closure of the traditional cinemas in Bletchley and Newport Pagnell. It had over 1 million admissions in its first year. After opening similar multiplexes across the country, in 1989, AMC sold up its UK business to UCI. The cinema was still run in part by MKEC who took the profits from the ticket sales while UCI had the profits from the concession stands. In 1991, it hosted a royal première of Harrison Ford's Presumed Innocent and was attended by Sarah, Duchess of York.

The ziggurat section of the Point on opening housed The Brasserie, The Croc Bar, a games arcade and a nightclub, as well as a Bingo hall (originally Gala Bingo, then Buzz Bingo after 2018) in the basement. There was a small newsagents outside the main entrance. In 1995, the owners of The Point refurbished the building and added a pizza restaurant (Deep Pan Pizza Co, later The Fresh Pizza Company), a health club and a bar/nightclub (Oasis, later Nexus).

The opening of Xscape in 2000 was to mark the beginning of the decline of The Point's fortunes. Xscape featured a more lucrative, state-of-the-art 16 screen multiplex, operated by Cineworld. With the two cinemas in close proximity to one another, it soon became apparent that The Point couldn't compete. Xscape quickly took the vast majority of The Point's cinemagoers, and in 2003, UCI abruptly left Milton Keynes, deciding to rent out the cinema part of the building in order to continue to honour its lease with the complex's owners.

=== easyCinema ===
The cinema was rented out to the easyGroup, renaming the cinema as easyCinema.com. The ticket pricing was based on the easyJet model with low headline prices (from 20p) for early bookers, then increasing according to demand. The foyer's popcorn, drinks and sweet stands were originally removed and visitors were encouraged to bring their own food. It showed films that had just recently finished their prime location runs and it did not rely on fixed showtimes. The business plan assumed that the operators could negotiate a fixed price for films (rather than a percentage per ticket sold), but the studios refused to negotiate on this basis.

In 2005, a refurbishment of the foyer saw the reintroduction of concession stands for food and drink, an easyInternetCafe was added, along with an easyPizza pick up point. The cinema and business model however was unsuccessful, and in May 2006 the lease was not renewed and the company handed back the cinema to UCI.

=== Odeon ===
By this point, UCI had been taken over by Terra Firma and was merged with rival chain Odeon Cinemas. In May 2006, the site was reopened as an Odeon cinema.

Despite the high-profile presence of Odeon, this couldn't halt the continuing decline of visitors. In 2007, both the pizza restaurant and nightclub closed due to a lack of business. These remained empty for many years, before becoming a YMCA funded cafe and a Connexions careers office respectively. By 2009, the illuminated lights on the ziggurat no longer lit up at night, signalling how much of a less importance it had become in recent times.

==== Cinema closure and planned demolition ====
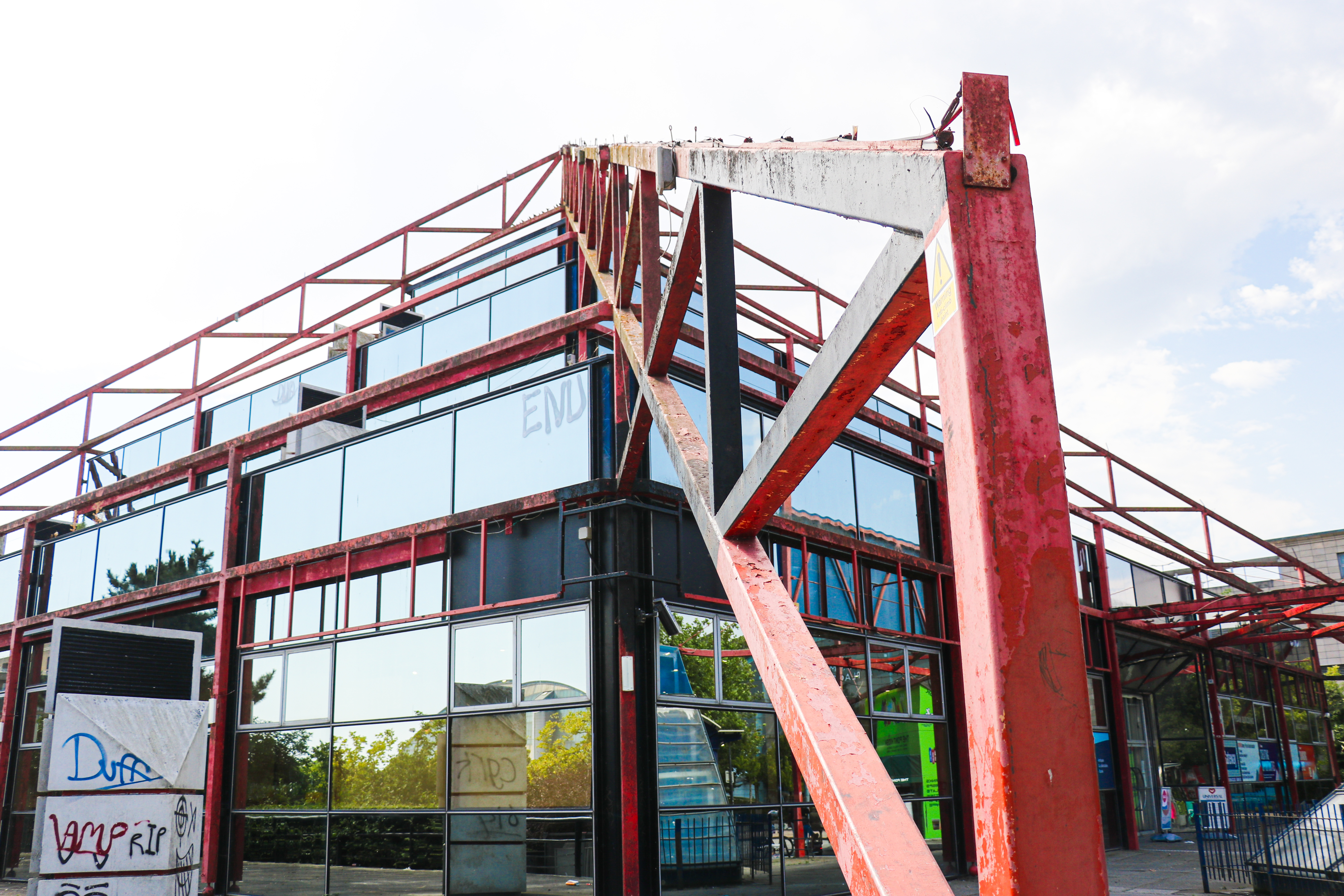
The Point Cinema, Milton Keynes, August 2024.

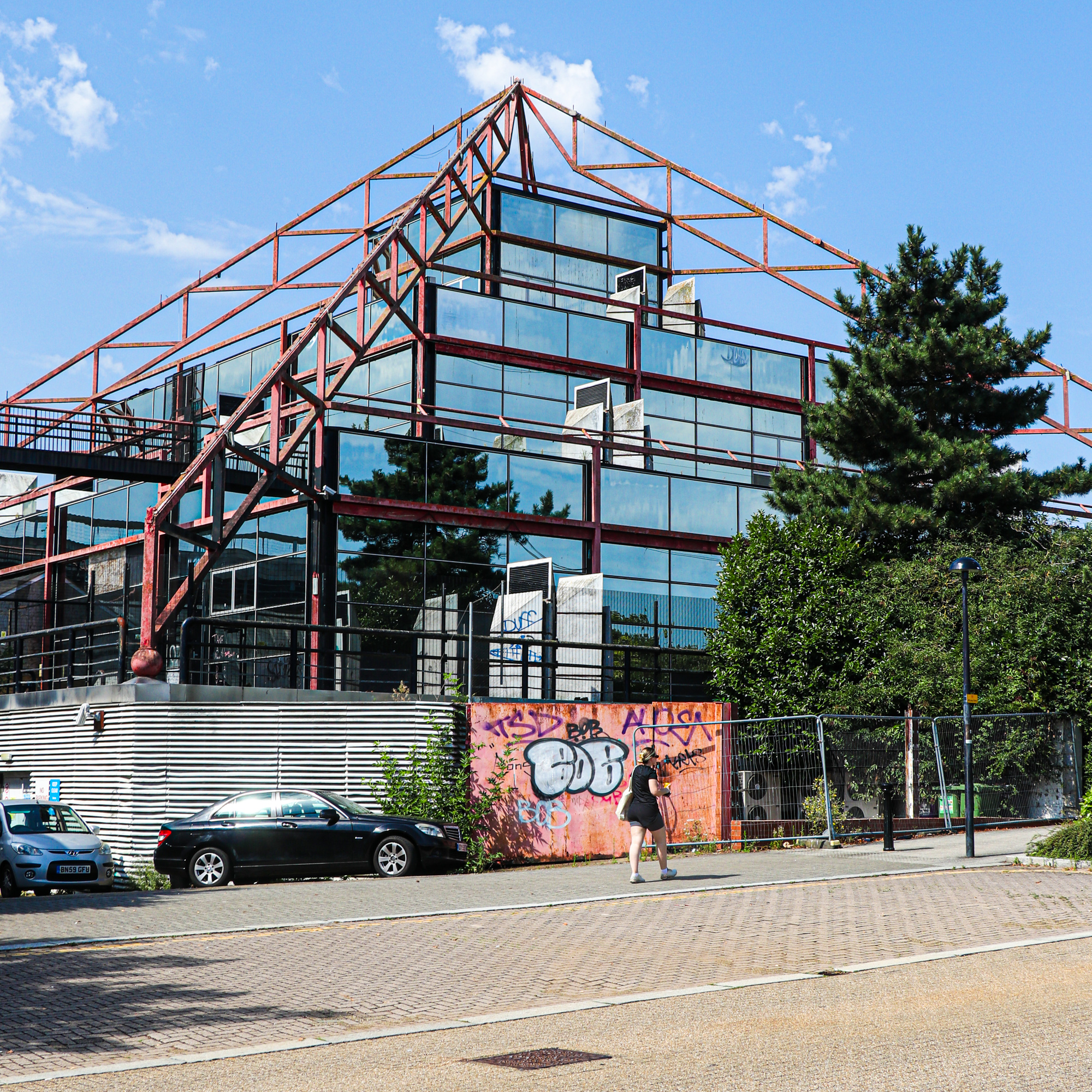
The Point Cinema, Milton Keynes, August 2024.

In 2012, the Point's owners, Hammerson, proposed plans to restructure the building as a new shopping and leisure complex, and asked for feedback from public in an open consultation. The plans were protested by some, given the building's history. An application to Historic England for the building to be given listed grade II status was rejected on the grounds that it lacks any architectural merit. The whole complex has subsequently been slated for demolition.

In 2013, Odeon announced plans to relocate to a new, 11-screen complex, complete with MK's first IMAX screen, in Denbigh, opposite Stadium mk. The cinema in the Point closed for the final time on 26 February 2015, nearly 30 years after its opening. Odeon's new cinema, officially known as 'Odeon Milton Keynes Stadium', opened for business the next day.

In 2020, mere days before the UK went into full lockdown as the COVID-19 pandemic continued to spread, the Buzz Bingo hall closed, in line with all other hospitality venues across the country. Whilst it was anticipated at the time that it would reopen, in July 2020, it was confirmed that as part of a rescue deal for the chain, 26 Buzz Bingo locations would be closed down permanently, including the Milton Keynes site. This means that 35 years since it first opened, all of The Point's entertainment and hospitality attractions have now closed down for good.

In 2022, the building was purchased by Galliard Homes, who are planning to demolish the original structure and replace it with a new housing development. Despite a plea from the Cinema Theatre Association that at least the ziggurat be retained, as of March 2022 the building is slated for demolition but an exact date for when the work will commence has yet to be scheduled.

The Twentieth Century Society added the building to its Risk List of architecture at risk of being lost in 2023. At the 18 July 2024 planning committee meeting, councillors unanimously rejected the demolition proposals, thereby granting a reprieve for the building. In July 2025, the developers won a planning appeal that over-ruled the refusal. and, in March 2026, a further attempt to secure listed building status also failed.
