= LoveFilm =

UK-based provider of DVD-by-mail and streaming video on demand

Lovefilm International Ltd.
- Type: Subsidiary
- Industry: Electronic commerce
- Founded: 2002; 24 years ago
- Founders: Graham Bosher; Alex Chesterman; Paul Gardner; Thomas Hoegh; Saul Klein; William Reeve
- Defunct: 31 October 2017; 9 years ago
- Fate: Replaced by Amazon Instant Video
- Successor: Prime Video
- Headquarters: London, England
- Area served: United Kingdom; Sweden; Norway; Denmark; Germany
- Key people: Christopher Cunningham (MSH); Jeff Siemanym (Operations Director)
- Products: DVD-by-mail video on demand
- Services: PlayStation 3 – November 2010; Xbox 360 – December 2011 iPad – September 2011; Wii and Wii U – December 2012
- Parent: Amazon.com
- Divisions: Lovefilm UK
- Website: Amazon storefront

LoveFilm was a United Kingdom–based provider of DVD-by-mail and streaming video on demand in the United Kingdom, Sweden, Norway, Denmark and Germany.

Acquired by Amazon.com in 2011, the service had reached 2 million subscribers. It claimed over 70,000 titles, and over 4 million DVD, Blu-ray or game rentals per month in five countries. Through a series of acquisitions, Lovefilm quickly became the leading online DVD rental and streaming outlet in the UK and Europe.

The company offered a download service alongside postal delivery but this ceased on 23 February 2009. The company also started a "watch online" service which offered over 4,700 films available to watch as part of a subscription. This online viewing was available for free to subscribers who had opted for one of their unlimited monthly rental plans or the unlimited streaming-only account.

On 26 February 2014, Amazon announced that Lovefilm's streaming service would be replaced with its Instant Video service, and in August 2017, Amazon announced that the Lovefilm By Post service would end on 31 October 2017, citing a "decreasing demand" for the discs.

== History ==
Lovefilm grew via 10 mergers, and the acquisition of several other on-line DVD rental companies – the three main ones being Online Rentals Limited (the original company), ScreenSelect and Video Island. Scandinavian Netflix clones Boxman, Brafilm and Digitarian were launched in 2002–2003, at the very same time as their UK-peers.

In May 2002, Paul Gardner and Graham Bosher launched Online Rentals Limited (trading as DVDsOnTap), based in Harlow, Essex.

In September 2003, William Reeve and Alex Chesterman launched ScreenSelect, based in Acton in West London. And in the same month Saul Klein launched Video Island, based in Kings Cross in central London, with backing from Robin Klein (venture capitalist) and Simon Franks' Redbus Films.

In June 2003, Ari Wegter, Lasse Stilvang and Joshua Mortensen had launched Digitarian in Denmark while Mattias Miksche and Jonas Svensson started Boxman in Stockholm. These two firms established an alliance which dominated the nascent DVD-by-mail sector in the Nordics. The continental founder group played a critical role in the growth and development of Lovefilm in Scandinavia and Germany until exit to Amazon.

In October 2003, Online Rentals Ltd was bought by Arts Alliance Ventures, a private equity firm owned by Thomas Hoegh. In December 2003, the company was rebranded and relaunched as Lovefilm. At the time, Arts Alliance also owned Picturehouse Cinemas with a dedicated film audience. The symbiotic relationship between the two sibling companies delivered a low cost-of-acquisition of customers and a higher attendance which, in sum, achieved a reinforcement of Lovefilm's business proposition. The company then appointed Mark Livingstone as CEO, and relocated to much larger premises in the Spire Green Business Park in Harlow, Essex.

ScreenSelect led what became a clutch of mergers across the UK DVD rental industry. In December 2003, this began with the acquisition of In-Movies. In September 2004, ScreenSelect followed up with the merger with Video Island, which combined ScreenSelect's management and brand with Video Island's venture capital.

The year 2005, saw both Lovefilm and ScreenSelect grow rapidly as fierce rivals – with strong backers, these two firms leaped ahead of their rivals. Lovefilm reached 50,000 subscribers in December 2004, and shortly afterwards acquired the retail chain Choices' online business. By March 2005, it had reached 100,000 customers, and shipped almost 700,000 rentals. In June 2005, Video Island under the ScreenSelect brand acquired DVDs365 (owner of Mailbox Movies, MovieTrak and Qflicks) and a few months later Lovefilm acquired Webflix. Both rivals acquired a Scandinavian firm; ScreenSelect acquired BraFilm (a Swedish and Norwegian business), and Lovefilm acquired Boxman (operating in Sweden and Denmark). Simon Calver joined as the CEO of Video Island in July 2005.

By 2006, Video Island/ScreenSelect had outgrown Lovefilm, with over 200,000 customers against Lovefilm's 100,000 users. In April 2006, led by Simon Calver, Lovefilm and Screenselect merged using ScreenSelect's management and technology platform, but with the Lovefilm brand, and moved the headquarters to Acton – ScreenSelect's original base. By the end of 2006 the Lovefilm brand had replaced ScreenSelect, Brafilm and Boxman everywhere except Norway – which followed in 2008.

Example of a Lovefilm envelope. The discs are returned to Lovefilm in the same envelopes in which they are sent to customers.

In February 2008, Lovefilm acquired Amazon's DVD rental business in the UK and German markets, and in return Amazon became the largest shareholder of Lovefilm.

Besides Amazon and Arts Alliance Ventures, venture capital firms Balderton Capital, DFJ Esprit, Index Ventures and Octopus Ventures also had stakes in Lovefilm.

In 2010, Lovefilm released their PlayStation 3 online streaming service.

On 20 January 2011, it was announced that Amazon, which previously owned 32% of Lovefilm, would take full control of the company in an acquisition deal worth a reported £200 million.

In September 2011, a Lovefilm app for the iPad was released to allow streaming films on iPad devices. The Lovefilm app was also released for the Xbox 360 in December 2011.

On 30 May 2012, Lovefilm partnered with NBC Universal to bring Universal films to their service, and also announced that they would be bringing HD Streaming to their services.

In October 2012, Amazon launched the Kindle Fire HD in the UK and Germany, which included Lovefilm integrated into the Amazon Videos application, much in the same way Amazon Instant Video is integrated in the United States. Subsequent streaming application launches, including the Wii U in December 2012, and a revamped PS3 application in May 2013, demonstrated a markedly similar – and considerably improved on Lovefilm's previous offerings – UI design shared with Amazon Instant Video.

On 10 June 2013, Lovefilm announced that it would shut down its service in Scandinavia.

Up until July 2013, Lovefilm offered a video game rental service to customers. In July 2013, it issued a statement letting both new and existing customers know that this service would no longer be offered beginning 8 August 2013.

On 21 February 2014, it was announced that the Lovefilm video-on-demand service would be discontinued on 26 February 2014, and folded into Amazon Instant Video. The Lovefilm name would be maintained for the DVD rental business, although this service was embedded into Amazon as well.

On 14 August 2017, Amazon announced it would terminate the Lovefilm by Post service on 31 October 2017.

== Rental services operated for other companies ==
Besides its own DVD rental and purchase sites, Lovefilm used to run a number of such sites on behalf of other companies. The following is a list of previous white label services operated by Lovefilm:

- WHSmith Movies Direct – from the WH Smith bookstore chain.
- Tesco DVD Rental – service for the Tesco supermarket chain website. On 1 August 2012 Lovefilm replaced Tesco DVD Rentals. All customers were switched over and given (at no extra cost) access to Lovefilms Library on DVD, as well as new features like multiple rental lists, Lovefilm Instant and Games for Xbox 360 and PlayStation 3.
- EasyCinema – service in conjunction with the Easy Group
- Odeon Direct – service in conjunction with the Odeon cinema chain
- Nectar DVD Rental – service for the Nectar loyalty card
- CD-WOW! – an online retailer
- Sofa Cinema – site sponsored by the Guardian newspaper

== Advertising ==
Lovefilm originally used partners to advertise its services but started to run TV adverts from 2006. Since then, the number of white label services and partners had decreased, possibly due to increased brand awareness of the Lovefilm name. Since advertising on a regular basis on TV the company used British male actors for voice overs – Simon Pegg, Ewan McGregor, Bill Nighy and Ray Winstone. In 2009, the theme song for the TV ads was "It Must Be Love" by Madness. Lovefilm advertised in multiple media – online, press, TV, train posters, door drops, promotions and even toilet posters in clubs, pubs and service stations.

== "Throttling" and dispute of fair usage policy ==
Lovefilm came in for criticism from users over its claim to offer "unlimited" DVD rentals. Some users reportedly found the company used long delays at the shipping stage to reduce the number of films a month a customer can rent. In 2006, before the merger with ScreenSelect, Lovefilm was subject of complaints to the Advertising Standards Authority over the use of the word "unlimited" in their advertising. The ASA upheld the complaint. It was revealed that they practised throttling, where high-volume customers experienced slower shipments from different warehouses and selections from lower in their rental list. They were also less likely to receive replacement shipments on the same day a disc is received. The company claimed that this "fair usage" policy means all customers get a similar service.

== Dispute with Universal Pictures ==
In late November 2009, Lovefilm stopped adding new DVDs from the distributor Universal Pictures (UK) to the rental area of their site. This made a number of films unavailable to users, including Public Enemies, The Invention of Lying, Brüno, Funny People, Inglourious Basterds and Kick-Ass. The dispute was resolved in May 2012, and Lovefilm offered for rental and for streaming post-2009 films distributed by Universal Pictures.

== See also ==
- Netflix, founded in 1997, launched their UK online streaming service to compete with Lovefilm.
