= EasyCoach =

easyCoach was a bus operator based in Shrewsbury, England. It was operated by a company called The Skiers Lodge under the easyGroup brand. Its director was Andrew Martin.

== History ==
easyCoach was launched in 2017. In September 2017, the company took over operating the 436 Shrewsbury to Bridgnorth service. Following a disagreement with the local council, it ceased operating it after 1 January 2018. The company began operating in Wrexham in July 2018 with four services, but withdrew after two months. Following an investigation by the Traffic commissioner, the company was banned in March 2019 from holding a license for two years.
