= EasyHotel =

International super budget hotel chain

easyHotel
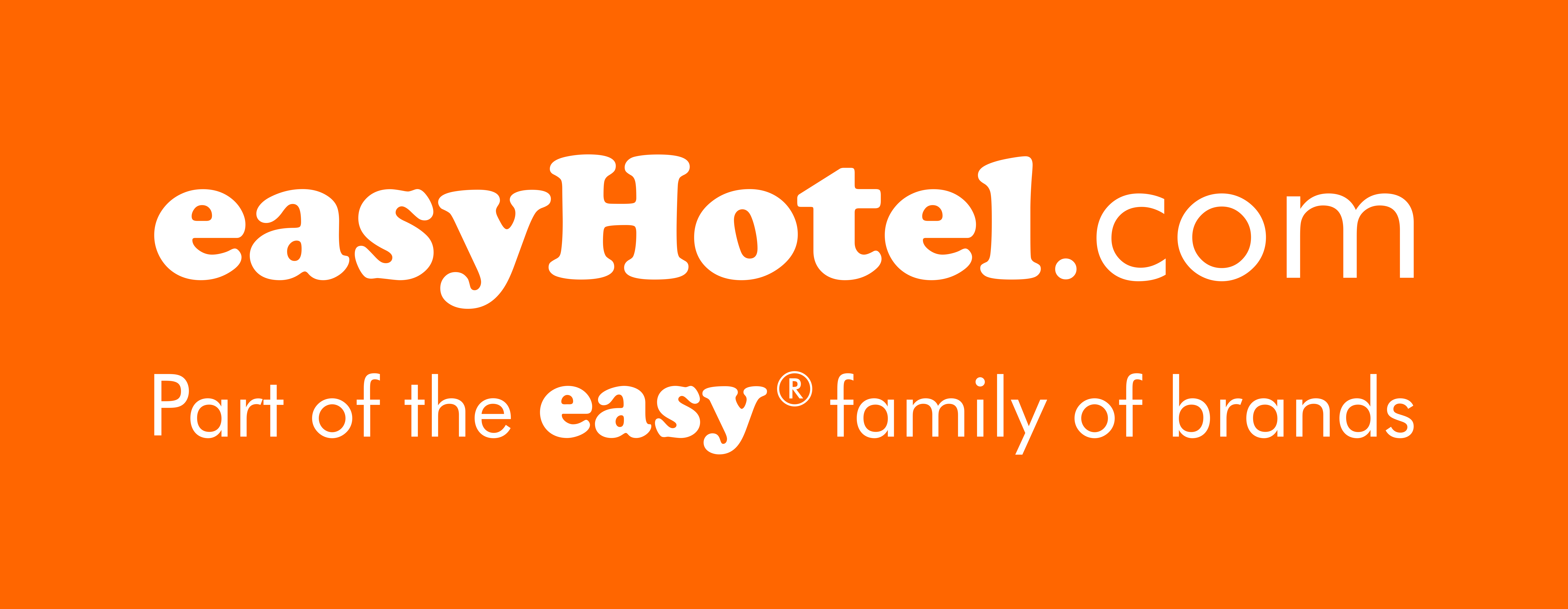
- Industry: Hotels
- Founded: 19 January 2004; 22 years ago
- Founder: Stelios Haji-Ioannou
- Headquarters: London, England, UK
- Number of locations: Over 40
- Area served: Europe
- Key people: Charles Persello - interim CEO
- Owner: Tristan Capital Partners
- Website: www.easyhotel.com

EasyHotel (styled as easyHotel) is a low-budget hotel chain with hotels across Europe.

== History ==
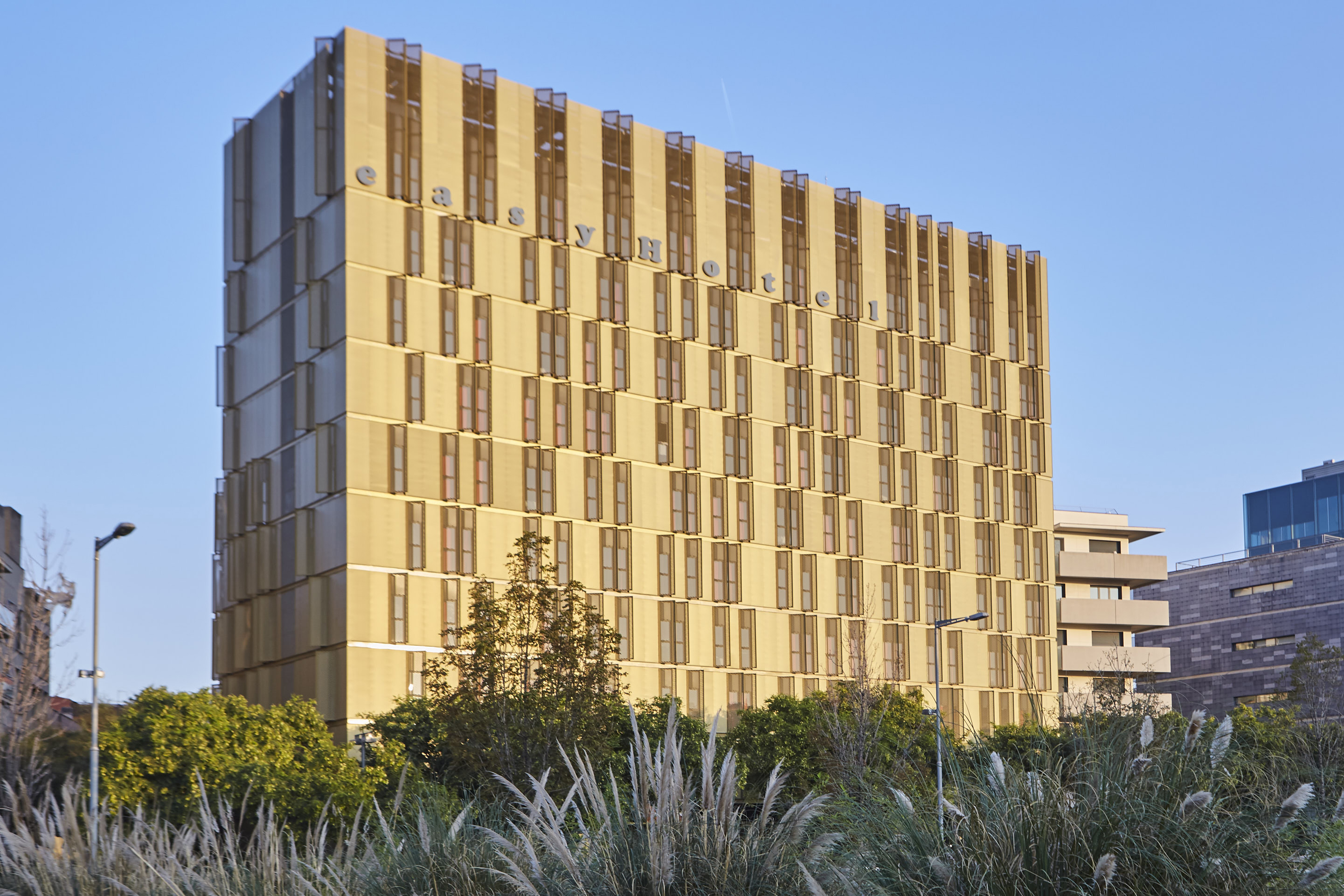
Photo of easyHotel Barcelona Fira

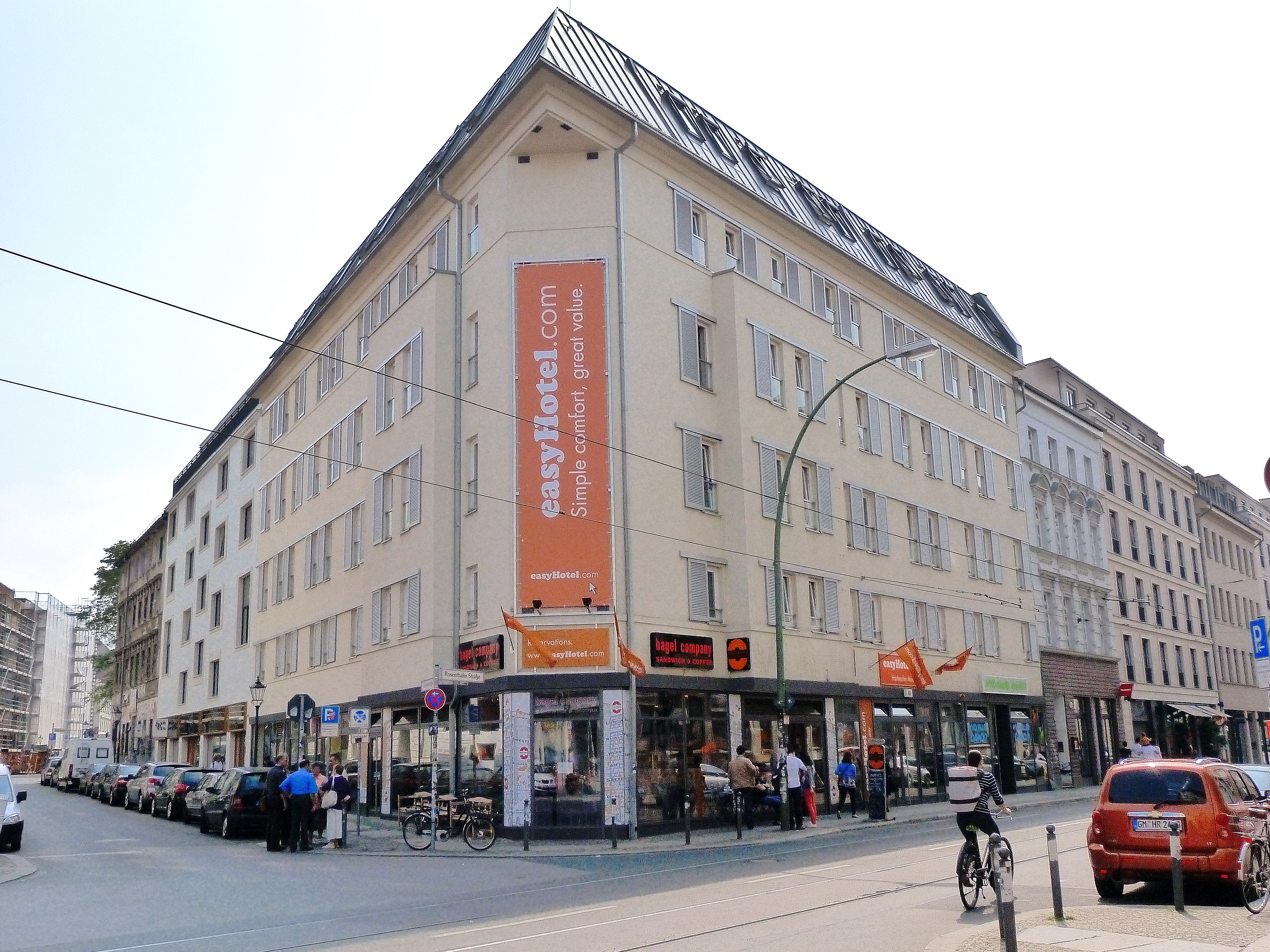
Photo of easyHotel Berlin

Originally founded by Stelios Haji-Ioannou through the easyGroup, easyHotel was incorporated in 2004 and opened its first hotel in South Kensington, London in 2005. Whilst easyHotel owned its first hotel in South Kensington (which was subsequently sold and franchised in 2007), its growth strategy in its early years was to expand via franchise contracts.

In June 2014, the firm floated on the London Stock Exchange raising £24.5 million to fund further growth and expansion. In August 2019, directors of the company backed a £139 million bid for the company despite opposition from founder Sir Stelios Haji-Ioannou.

The bidding consortium was made up of Luxembourg-based ICAMAP and Ivanhoé Cambridge of Canada. Ivanhoe is owned by Quebec’s pension company, CDPQ (Caisse de depot et placement du Quebec). As of 2021, ICAMAP and Ivanhoé Cambridge now own the majority of shares in the company. The majority owners also announced to invest €50 million to vastly expand the chains operations, with the aim of tripling the size of its real estate in Europe by 2026.

In December 2021, Karim Malak was appointed CEO after the sudden death of François Bachetta at the age of 56 in June of the same year. In October 2022, easyHotel acquired eight franchised easyHotel properties in The Netherlands and Belgium from Crossroads Real Estate for € 145 million. As of May 2024, easyHotel has 26 owned and leased easyHotel properties and 17 franchised easyHotel properties.

In May 2025, founder Stelios Haji-Ioannou celebrated the full acquisition of easyHotel Ltd by funds managed by Tristan Capital Partners LLP - a leading real estate investment management firm with over €15 billion in assets under management. This strategic move strengthens Tristan’s position in the European budget hotel market, bringing its total committed hotel investments to more than €1 billion as of May 2025.

On June 5, 2025, Tristan Capital Partners announced that an affiliate had completed the acquisition of the hotel chain for €400 million.

== Properties ==
Today the easyHotel network is made of owned, leased and franchised hotels across Europe in cities including London, Paris, Marseille, Barcelona and Madrid. easyHotel is a member of the easy family of brands which include easyJet, easyGym and easyStorage.
