= EasyInternetcafé =

1999–2009 Internet café chain

easyInternetcafé
- Type: Subsidiary
- Founded: 1999
- Founder: Stelios Haji-Ioannou
- Defunct: 2009
- Parent: easyGroup
- Website: easyinternetcafe.com

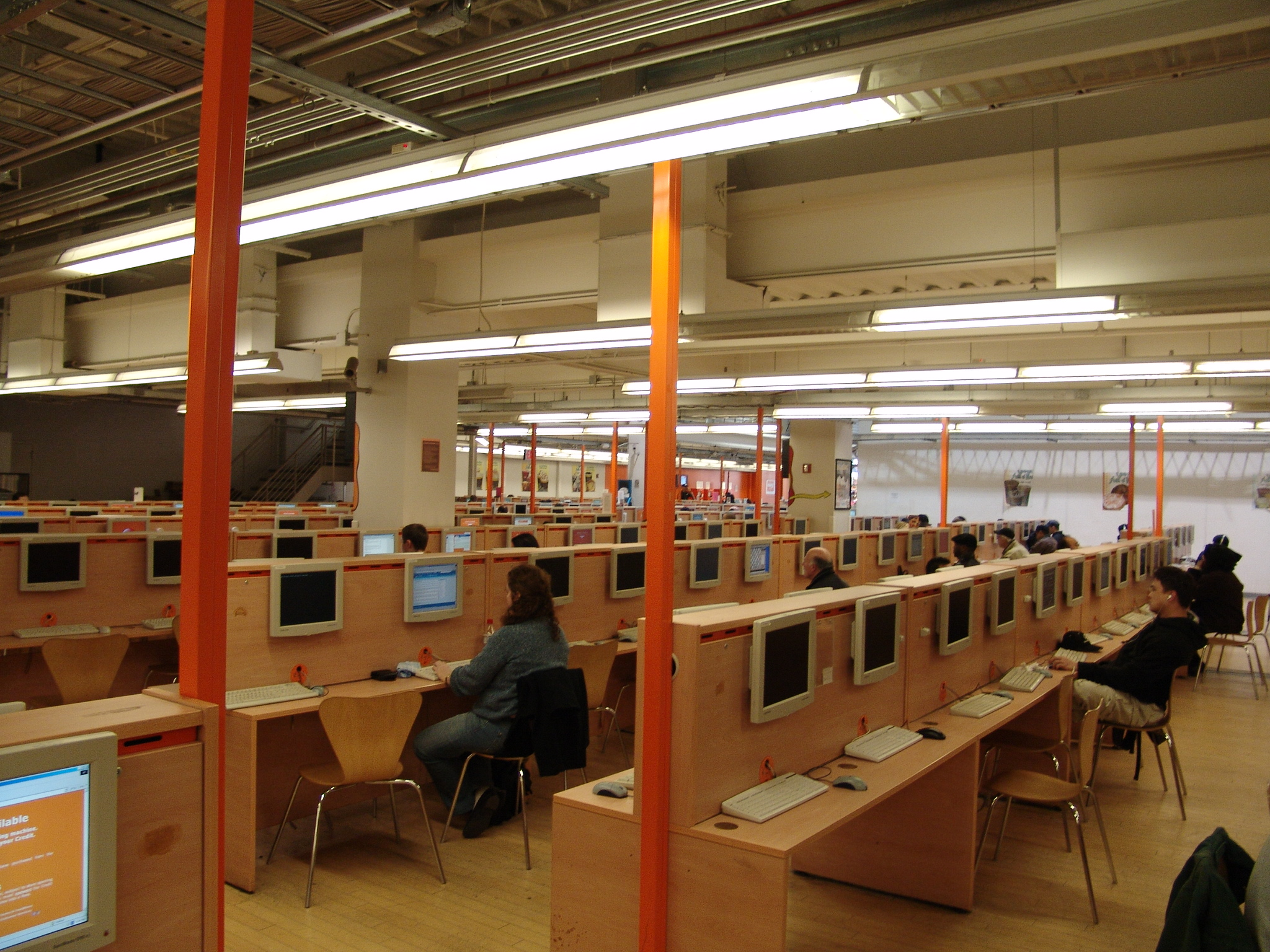
EasyInternetcafé New York.

EasyInternetcafé (styled as easyInternetcafé) was a chain of Internet cafés and a unit of Stelios Haji-Ioannou's EasyGroup.

It was Europe's largest chain of Internet cafés and was the holder of the record for the world's largest Internet café (as certified by Guinness World Records) with 800 terminals near New York's Times Square, opened by Carly Fiorina, CEO of Hewlett-Packard (HP) in November 2000. The 75 outlets in the easyInternetcafé chain were managed by 28 franchises.

== History ==
=== EasyEverything ===
The business was launched in 1999 with the name easyEverything. The company built yield management into its business system and adapted this to a penetration pricing strategy to build location, brand and product awareness. In several European countries it was able to build upon some degree of brand awareness created by the marketing activities of its sister company, the airline EasyJet.

EasyEverything was different from most Internet cafés in that it offered dynamically priced services on the High Street. The principle was as the occupancy, the number of customers, in a café (or group of cafés) increases, so does the rate per hour they pay for services. Viewed conversely, as the occupancy increases, the number of minutes of a service that customers get for their £, $ or € decreases. The business was aggressive and disruptive with its pricing strategy, offering high-speed Internet access at a price per hour of up to 80% less than competing Internet cafés. An EasyEverything customer could 'roam' nationally, i.e. use their pre-paid credit for services at different Internet cafés in the same country.

EasyEverything partnered with Microsoft to provide games and personal productivity software as metered services and with the network provider Deltathree for an Internet telephony service.

In September 2000, EasyEverything was named 'E-company of the Year' at Future Publishing's Internet awards ceremony. The award was voted for by members of the public. In the same year it received an award from Retail Week magazine for 'Retail Launch of the Year' and from Network Telecoms magazine for the 'Most Innovative Use of Network Products and Services.' In November 2000 it won the award for 'International Property Strategy and Development, Design, Innovation and Concept' at the MAPIC awards in Cannes, France, one of the most prestigious awards ceremonies in the international retail real estate sector. In February 2001 EasyEverything launched its own media sales house, easyEverything media sales (ee-ms), in a joint venture with the WPP advertising and marketing services group.

In June 2001 EasyEverything received the 'Investment in France 2001' award at the French ambassador's residence in London.

=== EasyInternetcafé ===
The company achieved initial success in London with very large Internet cafés. In its subsequent rapid pan-European (and New York) expansion it overestimated demand for similar Internet cafés with hundreds of PCs open 24 hours a day at locations other than the most popular capital city epicentres for tourists and travellers. In response the business later had to rationalise its portfolio of outlets, make staff redundant (vending machines replacing staff as the method of dispensing service credit to customers), sublet retail space and overhaul head office and in-country operations. The business was reorganised on a franchising model focusing on more compact and locally managed sites operating with higher rates of occupancy. The company's first franchisee was the Greek retailer Germanos. The company was rebranded EasyInternetcafé. The company's operations were devolved entirely to its franchisees by 2009. easyGroup retains the easyInternetcafe brand name.

== Controversies ==
In July 2001 gay websites gaydar.co.uk and squirt.org called a boycott of easyInternetcafé (then called easyEverything), claiming that they blocked "harmless" gay websites. Websense, the filtering software being employed by easyEverything had blocked gay sites such as their own. An easyEverything spokesman responded described the sites as "offensive" owing to the images that they contain, but was unable to offer a clear definition of "obscene" content. easyEverything advised customers to contact Websense directly with any complaints about the filtering system.

In 2003 in Great Britain, the chain was found liable for copyright infringement occurring when customers used its CD-burning service to burn illegally downloaded music to their own CDs.
