= EasyBus =

Airport bus service company

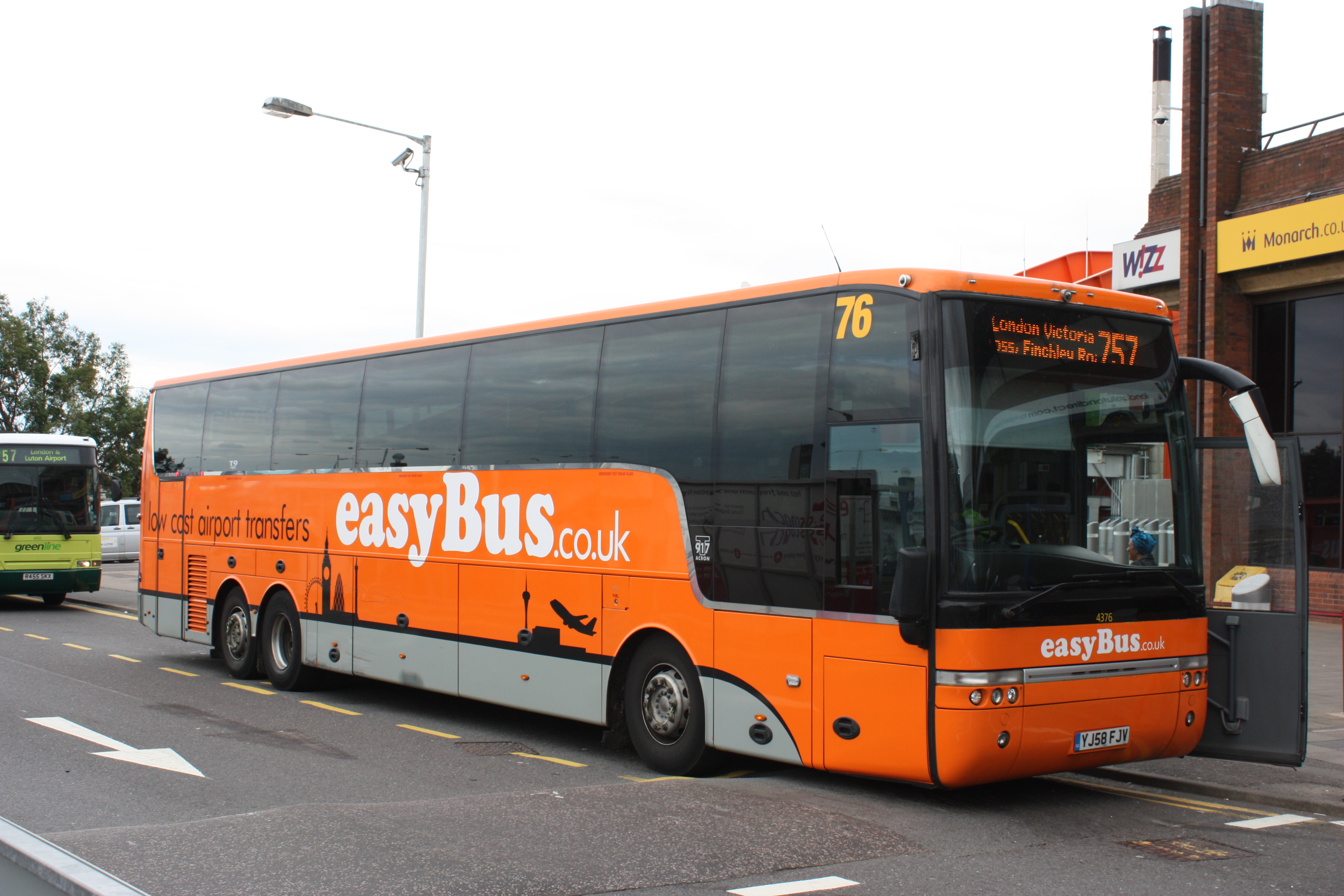
- easyBus Optare Soroco bodied Mercedes-Benz Sprinter minibus at Victoria Coach Station in April 2008
- Parent: EasyGroup
- Founded: 2003
- Service type: Coach
- Website: easybus.com

easyBus is an easyGroup company offering shuttle services between airports and city centres. It was founded by entrepreneur Stelios Haji-Ioannou in 2003. It initially also offered intercity services within the United Kingdom.

== History ==
=== Foundation and early years ===
easyGroup first announced its intention to operate no frills express services in 2003, initially in competition with National Express along the London to Birmingham corridor. Operations began in August 2004, with a service between London and Milton Keynes introduced. To keep costs down easyBus originally used Hendon Central station in north London as its terminal point, with a journey time of 65 minutes and a single fare of £5. The threat of competition forced National Express to offer its own discounted fares to and from London, culminating in the introduction of a £1 single fare between Milton Keynes and London which Stelios claimed was intended to make his service non-profitable and force its withdrawal.

Shortly after this EasyBus launched a second route to Luton Airport in competition with National Express' Jetlink subsidiary. In Spring 2005 EasyBus changed its London terminus from Hendon to a more central location in Baker Street. The Milton Keynes service was withdrawn in February 2006, with services to Luton increased in frequency and the operational contract transferred to Arriva Shires & Essex.

The dedicated service to Luton was withdrawn in May 2007, with services combined with the existing Green Line service 757. A new service to London Stansted Airport began operation at the same time. In July 2008 further expansion was announced with the launch of a half-hourly service between Gatwick Airport and Fulham Broadway station.

=== Development since 2010 ===
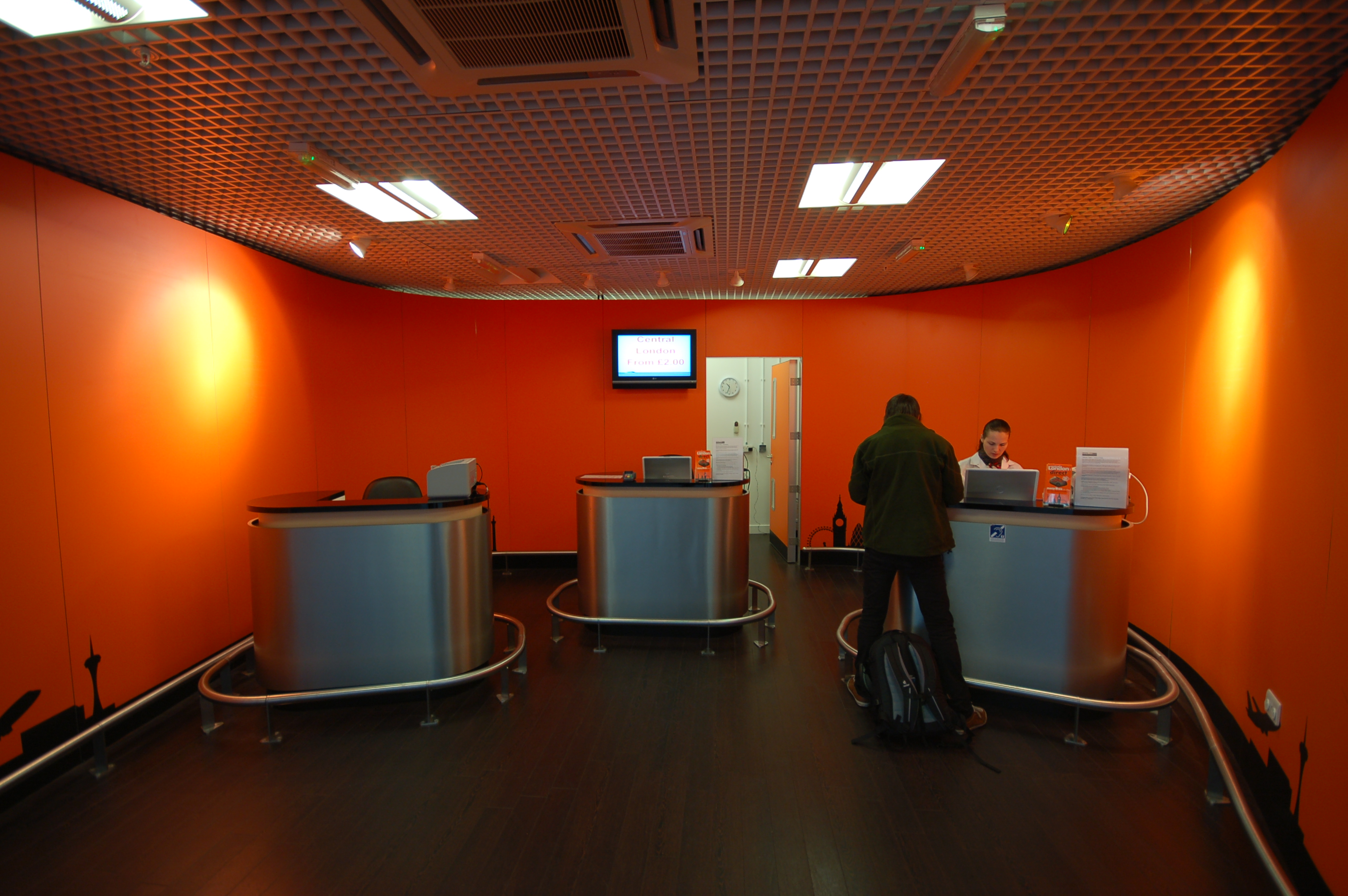
An easyBus ticket office at London Stansted Airport.

On 28 July 2010 an EasyBus Optare Soroco minibus overturned on the M25 motorway near the junction with the M23 in Surrey. A black car had lost control and had collided with the minibus, while it was carrying four passengers on a service from Gatwick Airport to London. One person became trapped in the vehicle and was cut free by fire crews. Four people were injured in the accident, including three passengers and the driver of the car. One woman was taken to St George's Hospital in Tooting with serious leg injuries. The other three were treated for less severe injuries at East Surrey Hospital, Redhill. The clockwise carriageway of the road between junctions 6 and 8 was closed for six hours following the crash, as was the slip road to the M23.

On 15 May 2015, EasyBus opened its second continental route in partnership with SARL Chamexpress and its Paris shuttle service from Paris city centre (Louvre) to Charles de Gaulle Airport.

In November 2015 EasyBus withdrew the Stansted to Old Street route, and stopped operating the Stansted to Victoria/Baker Street route using its own vehicles. Instead it acts as a re-seller for National Express services. Stelios Haji-Ioannou tried to object to Stansted offering this route to a rival in court, but was rejected.

On 30 September 2016, the aforementioned route between Paris-CDG and Paris city centre has been terminated. Two new EasyBus services commenced on 21 October 2016 serving Manchester Airport. One operated between Manchester Airport, the University of Manchester and Manchester city centre but was withdrawn on 14 November. The second operates from Telford via Shrewsbury, Oswestry, Wrexham and the outskirts of Chester. The Manchester Airport services are operated by Express Airport Transfers (Europe) Ltd set up by businessman Andrew Martin who licences the Easybus brand from Easy Group. On 14 May 2018 a new service commenced connecting Liverpool John Lennon Airport with Chester, Wrexham, Oswestry and Shrewsbury.

== Network ==
As of 2024, easyBus operates airport bus transfers in the United Kingdom (5 airports) and Italy (3) as well as France, Spain, the Netherlands and Switzerland with one airport served in each country. Additional services are sold in cooperation with partner operators.
