= EasyGroup =

British multinational branded venture capital conglomerate

EasyGroup Ltd
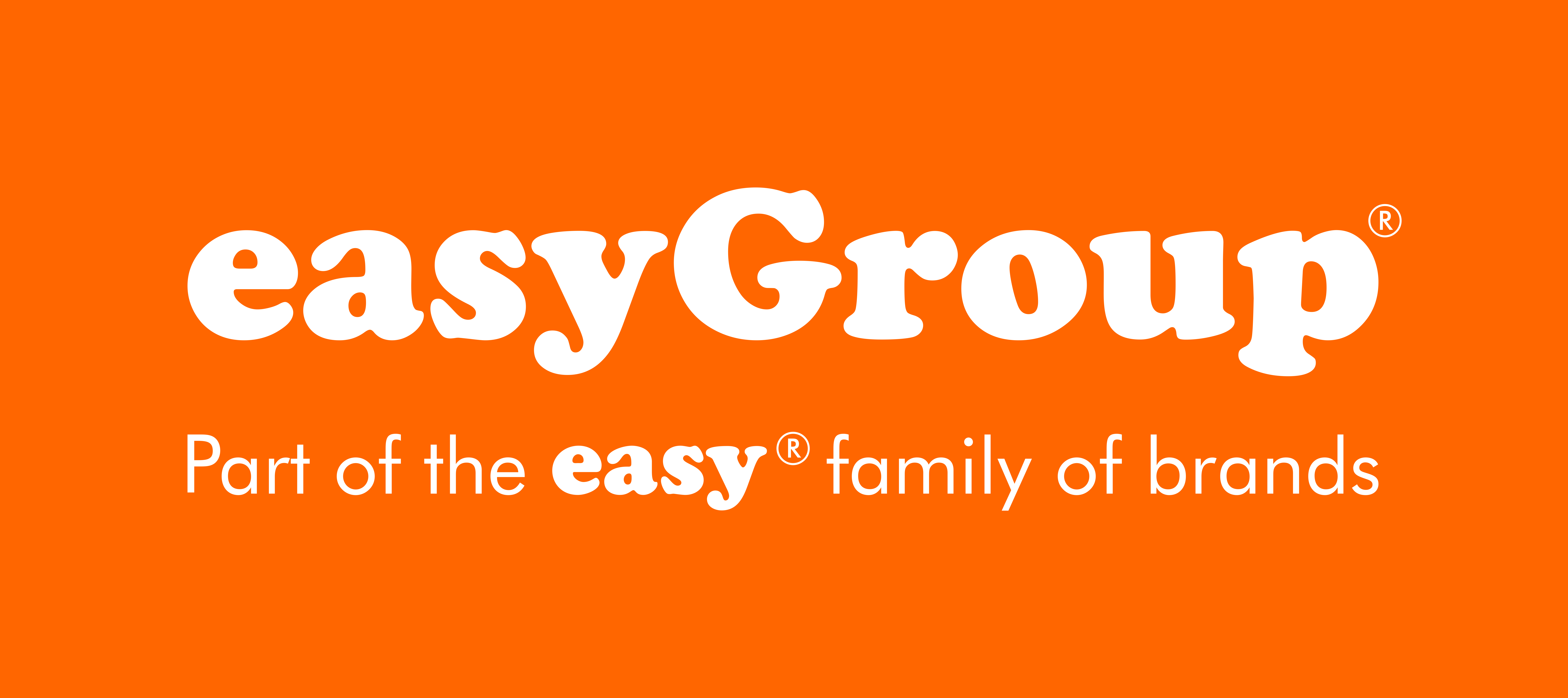
- Formerly: Gregshot Limited (2000); Easygroup IP Licensing Limited (2000-2014)
- Type: Private
- Industry: Conglomerate
- Founded: 1998; 28 years ago
- Headquarters: London, United Kingdom
- Products: Various
- Owner: Sir Stelios Haji-Ioannou
- Subsidiaries: EasyGroup IP Licensing Ltd
- Website: easy.com

EasyGroup Ltd (styled as easyGroup, or simply easy) is a British multinational venture capital conglomerate founded in 1998. It is headquartered in London, United Kingdom and privately owned by Stelios Haji-Ioannou.

== Corporate affairs ==
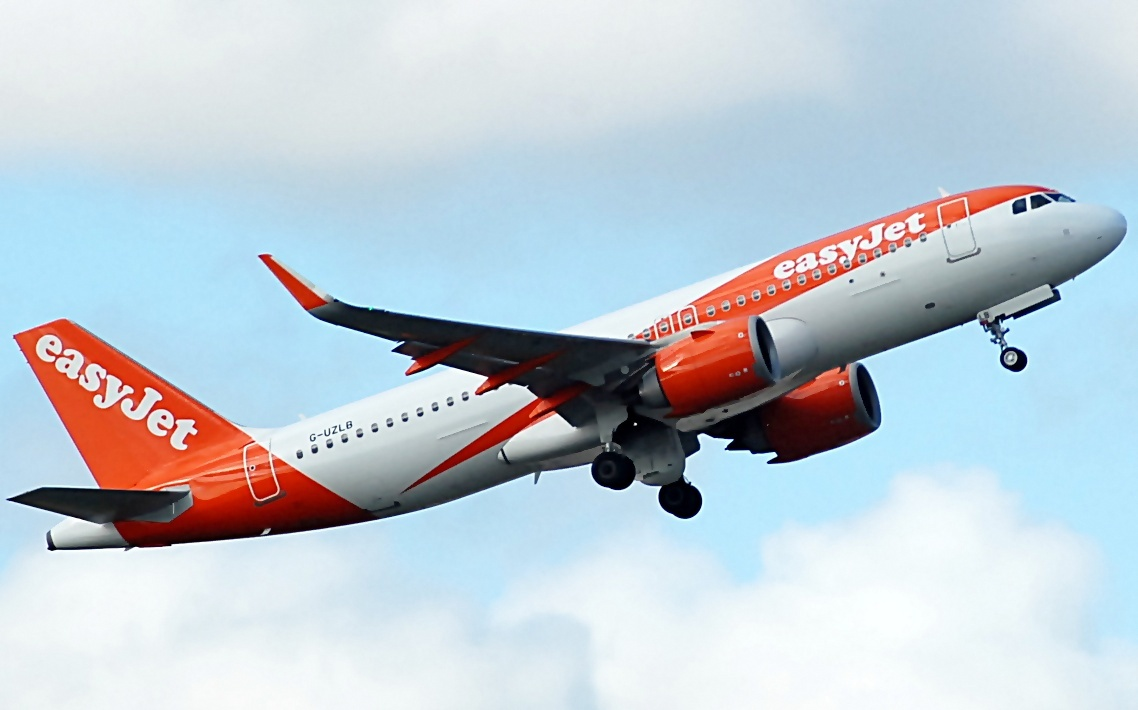
An easyJet aircraft

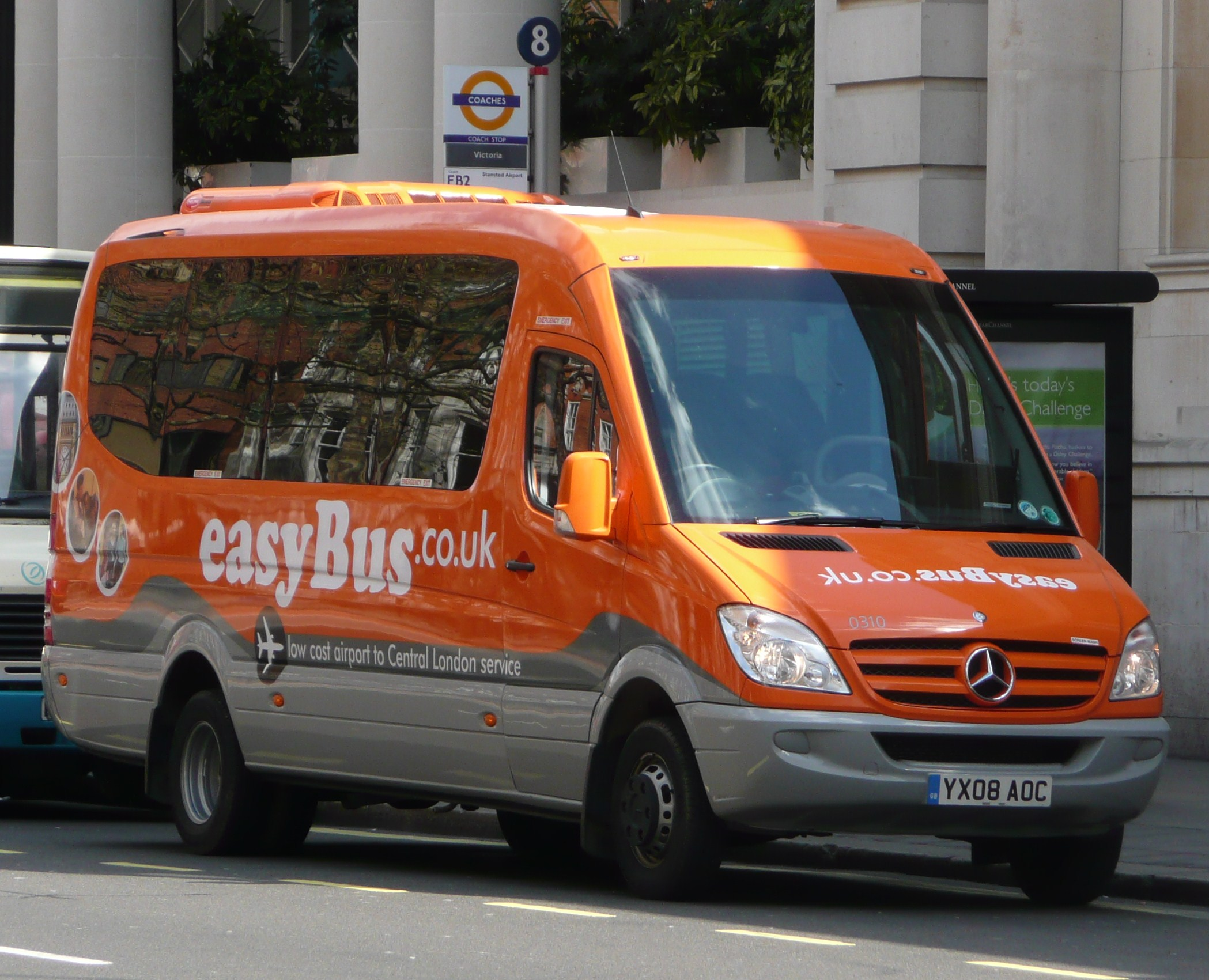
An easyBus minibus

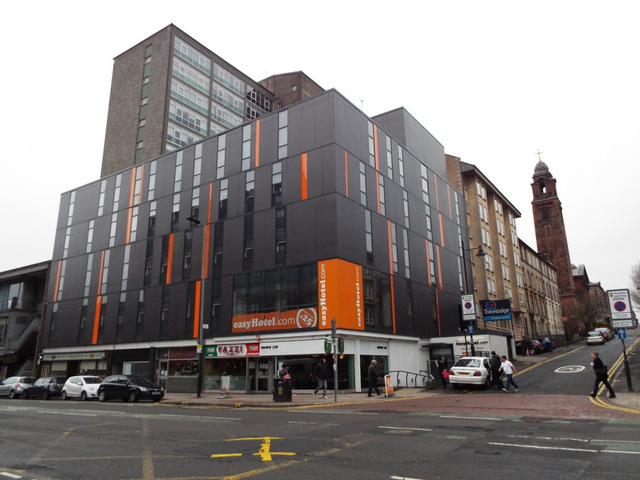
easyHotel in Glasgow

=== Overview ===
The company was established to expand the "easy" brand following the launch of easyJet in 1995. The first use of "easy" after easyJet was the EasyInternetcafé established in June 1999, followed by easyRentacar in 2000 which was renamed to easyCar in 2000. The group is registered in the Cayman Islands, but operates from its office in Kensington, London.

easyGroup Holdings Ltd is the holding company controlling the "easy" family of brands. Through its wholly owned UK subsidiary easyGroup IP Licensing Ltd, renamed easyGroup Ltd in 2014, the company licences the easy brand to other businesses. The easyGroup of companies have a complex structure that contains elements of a generic conglomerate and a keiretsu, and sometimes it simply licences its brand without any actual shareholding in the licensee company. easyGroup publishes brand guidelines for all easy companies to follow.

The easyGroup logo is known for its distinctive orange colour, Pantone 021.

=== Legal action ===
In 2002, Easyart.com (now King and McGaw) faced legal allegations from easyGroup over its use of the easy name, accusing Easyart of "passing off" on easyGroup's good name. Before commencing legal action easyGroup's lawyers bombarded Easyart.com with threatening letters, despite having accepted £2,000 worth of advertising from the art company in its EasyInternet cafes not long after it launched. "This was a David and Goliath fight. It is a good day for smaller companies who stand up to bullying tactics from large corporations. We hope this gives hope to many other companies out there who are trading legitimately under the 'Easy' name and who have been threatened by this man", said Simon Matthews, founder of Easyart.com.

In 2005, easyGroup threatened legal action against a Welsh company which had been trading as EasyMobile since 2003, two years before the launch of easyGroup's easyMobile business which is not currently running. In 2006, easyGroup dropped action against London businessman Karl Kahn after it emerged that his EasyPizza business predated easyGroup's business of the same name by several years.

In 2008, a restaurant in Northampton agreed to stop calling itself "easyCurry" after threats of legal action from easyGroup. As of 2009, differences had emerged at easyJet concerning travel-associated "extras" such as hotel bookings under the "easyJethotels" brand, and car hire under "easyJetcarhire". EasyGroup contended that it licensed the "easyJet" brand primarily for airline use, and that using the brand for hotel and car hire interfered with other EasyGroup businesses.

In 2011, the Edmonton-based company Eezy Drive received a letter from easyGroup's lawyer Clarke Willmott, asking the owner Zeeshan Haniffa to stop using the name of his driving school, Ezee Drive Driving School, accusing him of "intellectual property infringement" and giving him seven days to destroy £1,000-worth of signs, leaflets and posters using the name, and hand over website domain names within two weeks. In 2012, a Northwich-based gym called Easy Exercise was challenged that it could not use the Easy name, with easyGroup citing "The easy name is synonymous with quality, value for money services and we have a duty to protect the public from its unauthorised use."

In September 2018, easyGroup was taking legal action against Netflix over its comedy series Easy, claiming its use of the name breaches its European trademarks. Netflix said in a statement that "viewers can tell the difference between a show they watch and a plane they fly in". In a ruling in 2021, EasyGroup Ltd v Easylife Ltd (formerly Easylife Group Ltd), and another [2021] EWHC 2150, Dr Jonathan Cornthwaite of the long-established legal firm Wedlake Bell said "This case was brought in attempt to prevent a retailing business called Easylife Ltd and its director from (among other things) using various brands incorporating the word 'easy'. However, the claimant not only lost its cases for trade mark infringement and passing off, but also suffered the revocation of various of its UK trade marks on the grounds of non-use."

In February 2022, easyGroup filed a lawsuit against the charity shopping website easyfundraising for "brand theft". In April 2022, Stelios Haji-Ioannou was described as a "deeply unimpressive witness" who gave answers "that were defensive to the point of implausibility" by a High Court judge who oversaw a trademark disagreement involving EASYOFFICE, owned by a company called Nuclei. The judge, Mrs Justice Bacon, found in favour of Nuclei and said four easyGroup trademarks should be revoked on the "grounds of lack of genuine use".

In September 2024, a judgement in the High Court of Justice by The Honourable Mr Justice Fancourt ruled that Easyfundraising successfully defended against easyGroup's injunction to stop trading under 'easyfundraising', stating "….the average consumer would be unlikely to be confused merely on account of use of the word “easy”, even if the services could be regarded as having some degree of similarity."

In December 2024, easyGroup filed an infringement lawsuit against DJ Finn Keane, then professionally known as easyFun. The company accused Keane of "mimicking [their] famous branding to create instant brand recognition for his DJing business". It took particular issue with the cover of Keane's first EP under the easyFun name, Deep Trouble, which featured passengers exiting a plane after a crash. Keane agreed to drop the easyFun name, and did so in October 2024.

== Subsidiaries and investments ==
=== Current properties ===
As of 2026, easyGroup lists over 100 easy branded business ventures and websites in a wide range of sectors, which include:

Brand / Venture	Sector	Status
easyJet	Airline	Active
easyHotel	Hotels / hospitality	Active
easyShop	Online shopping	Active
easyCar	Car rental	Active
easyBus	Transport	Active
easyCleaning	Cleaning products	Active
easyStorage	Self-storage	Active
easyLife	Online catalogue retailer	Active
easyVoyage	Travel information / comparison website	Active
easyMoney	Financial services	Active
easyBet	Gambling	Active
easyCruise	Online cruise retailer	Active
easyGym	Fitness	Active
easyBitcoin	Cryptocurrency	Discontinued from November 30, 2026
easyTransfer	Large data transfer service	Active
easySim	Telecommunications	Active
easyFerry	Ferry transport	Active

=== Formerly owned companies ===
Amongst the ventures formerly owned by easyGroup which are still in operation under new full or partial ownership are hotel chain easyHotel, financial intermediary services brand easyMoney and African low-cost airline Fastjet.

=== Defunct ventures ===
Examples for former easyGroup brands and business ventures that since ceased operations for various reasons are easyInternetcafé, easyCinema, easyCoach, easyCruise (which ceased operations after it had been sold to Hellenic Seaways), easyFoodstore and easyPizza.
