= Quidgest =

- Type: S.A.
- Industry: Rapid Application Development, Web applications, Information Technology, Computer Software, Research and Development
- Founded: Lisbon, Portugal (1988)
- Headquarters: Lisbon, Portugal, Macau, China, Munich, Germany, Dili, Timor-Leste, Maputo, Mozambique
- Key people: Cristina Marinhas (CEO)
- Products: 1ERP - Enterprise Resource Planning Software; QuidHealth; SINGAP
- Number of employees: 150

Quidgest is a software engineering company headquartered in Lisbon, Munich, Maputo and Dili. It was founded in Lisbon, Portugal in 1988.
