= Glintt =

Portuguese technology company

Glintt – Global Intelligent Technologies
- Company type: S.A.
- Traded as: Euronext: GLINTT
- Industry: Computer Software, Research and Development, Business Consulting
- Founded: 2008; 18 years ago in Lisbon, Portugal
- Headquarters: Beloura Office Park – Edf.10; Quinta da Beloura; 2710-693 Sintra
- Key people: Luís Cocco; João Paulo Cabecinha; Eduardo Antunes; Miguel Leocádio
- Products: Glintt Next - Multisectorial technology consultancy and Glintt Life - Healthtech iberian leader
- Revenue: 120 M€ (2014)
- Number of employees: 1,200
- Website: www.glinttglobal.com

Glintt Global (Glintt Global Intelligent Technologies) is a Portuguese technology company formed after the merging of ParaRede and Consiste. After the merger, it became one of the largest Portuguese technological companies. It operates in Europe, Africa and Latin America and holds a strong position on the Health, Pharmacies, Hospitals, Banking, Telecommunications Financial, Energy, Industry and Public Administration sectors.
