= Stelios Haji-Ioannou =

Cypriot and British businessman (born 1967)

Sir Stelios Haji-Ioannou
- Στέλιος Χατζηιωάννου
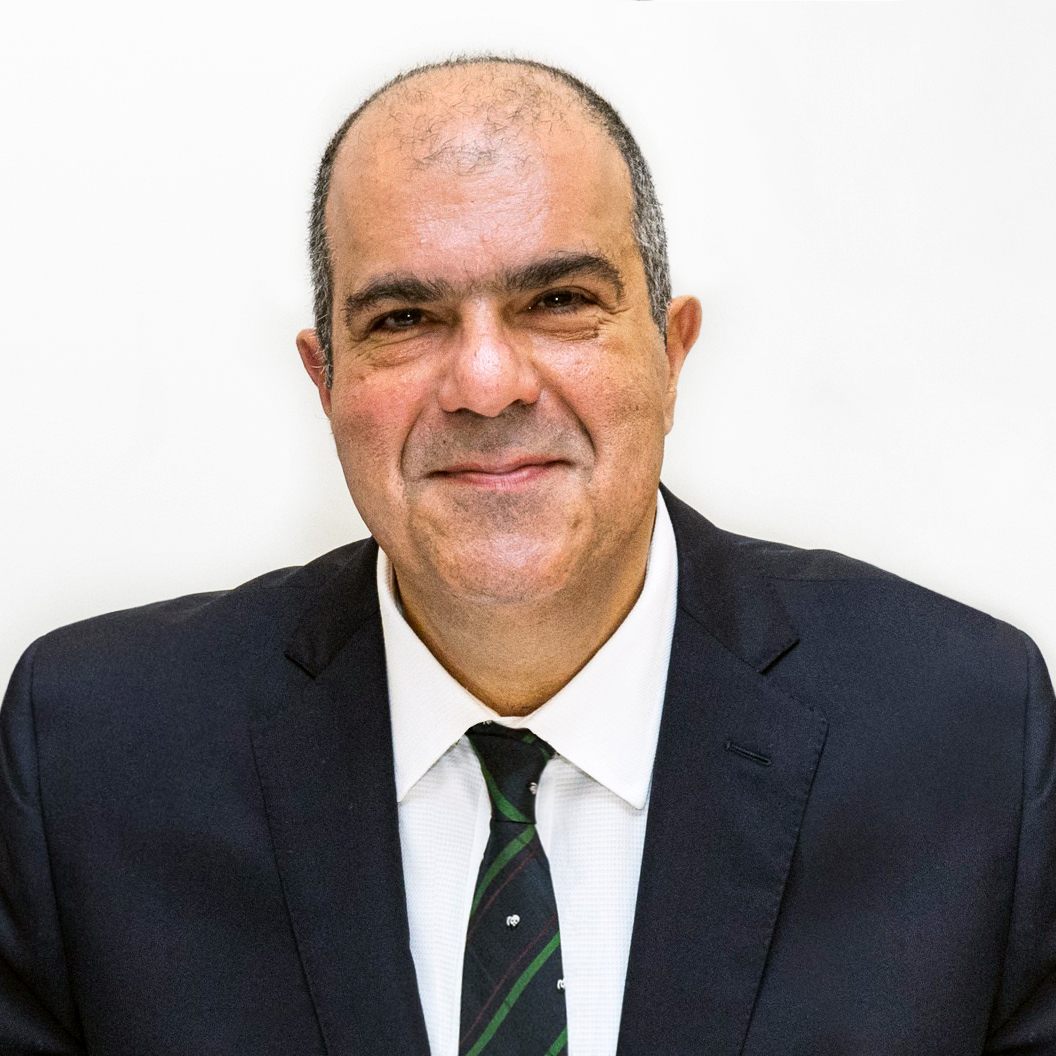
- Haji-Ioannou in 2022
- Born: 14 February 1967 (age 59); Athens, Greece
- Education: City, St George's, University of London; London School of Economics
- Occupation: Entrepreneur
- Known for: Founder and part-owner of EasyJet
- Relatives: Loucas Haji-Ioannou (father); Polys Haji-Ioannou (brother); Clelia Haji-Ioannou (sister)
- Website: stelios.org

Sir Stelios Haji-Ioannou (Greek: Στέλιος Χατζηιωάννου, romanized: Stelios Hatziioannou; born 14 February 1967) is a British-Cypriot entrepreneur. Born into a wealthy ship-owning family, he is best known for founding the low-cost airline easyJet and the Stelmar shipping line with start-up funds provided by his father, Loucas. EasyJet's foundation in 1995 marked the beginning of a series of ventures marketed under the "Easy" brand, managed by easyGroup and chaired by Haji-Ioannou.

== Early life ==
Stelios Haji-Ioannou was born in Athens, Greece, on 14 February 1967, the second of three children of Loucas and Nedi Haji-Ioannou (née Misirli). He has an elder brother, Polys, and a younger sister, Clelia. Both of his siblings have a large stake in easyJet. His father's family originates from the village of Pedoulas high in the Troodos Mountains of Cyprus, while his mother is from the village of Laneia at the foot of the mountains. After his secondary education in Athens, he studied economics at the London School of Economics, graduating with a BSc in 1987. He went on to obtain an MSc in Shipping, Trade & Finance from City University Business School. He was later awarded four honorary doctorates from City University Business School, Liverpool John Moores University, Newcastle Business School, and Cranfield University.

== Early career ==
Haji-Ioannou started working in 1988 for his father's already successful shipping business, Troodos Shipping Co Ltd. At 25, Haji-Ioannou received £30 million from his father, that he used to set up his own shipping company, Stelmar Shipping. Haji-Ioannou floated the company on the New York Stock Exchange in 2001. In 2005, Stelmar Shipping was sold to the OSG Group for approximately $1.3 billion.

== MT Haven shipping accident ==
In April 1991, a Troodos-owned VLCC oil tanker suffered a disaster that resulted in six deaths and spilt about 50,000 tons of crude oil into the sea, becoming arguably the Mediterranean's worst-ever ecological disaster. The tanker, M/T Haven, was an elderly vessel, formerly the Amoco Haven, sister ship of the ill-starred Amoco Cadiz that had foundered in 1978. Haji-Ioannou was accused of poor maintenance and charged in Italy with manslaughter, in addition to intimidating and attempting to bribe witnesses. Haji-Ioannou blamed the accident on an error by one of the surviving crew members. He and his father were acquitted by the jury. Subsequent civil demands for compensation were also dismissed by the courts.

== "Easy" companies ==
Haji-Ioannou started EasyJet in 1995 when he was 28 years old, running a service between Luton and Scotland. In 2000, EasyJet PLC was partially floated on the London Stock Exchange. In September 2021, Haji-Ioannou's stake in EasyJet was diluted from 25.3% to 15.3%. In July 2026, EasyJet accepted a buyout offer from Apollo Global Management, valuing the company at £5.7 billion. At the time, Haji-Ioannou and his family owned about 15% of the airline, worth approximately £855 million.

Haji-Ioannou conducts business via his private investment vehicle, the EasyGroup, which owns the "Easy" brand and licenses it to the various "Easy"-branded ventures, including the airline. Haji-Ioannou continues to extend his business interests, mainly in the field of travel and leisure by encouraging entrepreneurs to adopt the "Easy" brand for their companies.

EasyJet PLC is one of Europe’s largest airlines with a fleet of 356 aircraft carrying 93.4 million passengers annually (2025 figures).

Other travel/leisure-related businesses include:

- EasyCar, which offers a peer-to-peer car sharing scheme as well as low cost car rental in 2,000 locations globally
- EasyBus, which offers low cost bus transport between London/Paris/Geneva airports and their respective city centres
- EasyHotel, which offers low cost accommodation in city centres across Europe
- EasyFoodstore was a concept that was trialled with a view to offering discounted, "white-label" groceries to low-income and benefit dependent groups. As of late 2021, its only location has closed.
- EasyGym which offers low cost, no-contract gym memberships at 16 locations in the UK and five in France, while looking to expand further inside the EU.
- EasyProperty which offers an online service to homeowners and prospective buyers as well landlords and tenants.
- EasyCruise was a low-cost cruise line started in 2004. It was sold in August 2009 to Greek ferry operator Hellenic Seaways for £9 million and ran until it went defunct in 2010. In December 2024, EasyCruise became a cruise selling website.
- EasyCoffee owns a number of self-service coffee machines including a cafe in Central London.
- EasyStorage offers low cost storage, sometimes referred to as Self Storage. Customers pay a sensible margin for storage and then pay for all the extras as they need them. These would be packing materials, packing, insurance, as well as collection and delivery.
- EasyInternetcafé was Europe's largest chain of Internet cafés and was the holder of the record for the world's largest Internet café. It went defunct in 2009.

== Fastjet ==
In September 2011 it was reported that Haji-Ioannou was working on Fastjet, a new low-cost airline serving routes within Africa, as part of a joint venture with Lonrho plc. The airline started operations on 29 November 2012 with Airbus A319 aircraft. From 2018 onward, Fastjet came under the control of Solenta Aviation Holdings Limited, which became the airline’s holding company and majority shareholder. Subsequent filings do not record Haji-Ioannou being among major shareholders.

== Battle with Ryanair ==
In 2009, Haji-Ioannou brought proceedings in London's High Court over Ryanair adverts which appeared in The Guardian, the Daily Telegraph and on Ryanair's website in January and February. The adverts featured a picture of Haji-Ioannou in the style of Pinocchio and referred to him as "EasyJet's Mr Late Again". The case was eventually settled out of court, with Haji-Ioannou receiving an official apology from the airline and the sum of £50,100, which Haji-Ioannou announced he would donate to his philanthropic foundation.

== Disagreement with EasyJet ==
In 2010, Haji-Ioannou left the board of EasyJet, in order to attempt to force the management of the company to abort their expansion plans.

In an interview with Management Today, he said: "EasyJet is seen as a huge success, which I'm happy about, because I own the brand. But EasyJet is a publicly listed company. The share price has gone up and down as it's got bigger and things have happened – but overall, really it's gone sideways... Basically, it's created no shareholder value for 10 years."

In 2013, Haji-Ioannou said he had become "increasingly concerned" at EasyJet's expansion plans. He announced that he sold 200,000 EasyJet shares in protest against plans to buy more planes, while his siblings have done the same with their shares.

In April 2020, Sir Stelios Haji-Ioannou publicly demanded the removal of EasyJet PLC's CEO, Johan Lundgren, and Chairman, John Barton, accusing them of a "deliberate mistake" in failing to cancel a £4.5 billion order for 107 Airbus aircraft. His criticism came amid the COVID-19 pandemic, as EasyJet simultaneously sought a £600 million loan from the UK government's coronavirus support scheme—despite grounding its entire fleet and facing severe financial pressures.

== Personal life ==
Haji-Ioannou has lived in Monaco since his family moved there when he was a teenager.

In the 2006 Birthday Honours, Haji-Ioannou, who holds both Cypriot and British citizenship, received a knighthood from Queen Elizabeth II for "services to entrepreneurship".

Haji-Ioannou was a member of the New Enterprise Council, a group set up to advise the Conservative Party on business policy. He stated at the time that this appointment did not reflect his political affiliations, adding, "I agreed to be included in the group of entrepreneurs because I was assured it will be non-partisan. [There is] not much difference between left and right any more."

In an April 2010 letter to the Daily Telegraph, Haji-Ioannou joined 23 other UK business leaders, including Marks & Spencer's Stuart Rose and Next's Simon Wolfson, criticising the Brown government's plans to raise National Insurance contribution rates.

The character of Omar Baba in the BBC comedy series Come Fly With Me is reportedly based on Haji-Ioannou.

In 2018, he filed an infringement claim against Netflix over their series Easy in a UK court, saying that use of the name breaches the Easy Group's European trademarks.

== Charity ==
His charitable foundation, the Stelios Philanthropic Foundation, supports education, as well as entrepreneurial and environmental initiatives through the provision of funding and advice in the UK, Greece and Cyprus. It also sponsors annual awards with cash prizes to entrepreneurs in the UK, Greece and Cyprus.

In March 2026, it was announced that the Sir Stelios Philanthropic Foundation, would donate €10 million to healthcare on small Greek islands, committing to funding the retention of 80 doctors on 47 remote Greek islands for 7 years.

== See also ==
- Cyprus Marine Environment Protection Association
- Low-cost airlines
