= List of Cypriot billionaires by net worth =

Republic of Cyprus
- Flag
- GDP (PPP): 2026 estimate
  - Total: ▲$67.441 billion (122nd)
  - Per capita: ▲$67,796 (29th)
- GDP (nominal): 2026 estimate
  - Total: ▲$45.171 billion (100th)
  - Per capita: ▲$45,409 (28th)
- Currency: Euro (EUR, €)

The following is a list of Cypriot billionaires, based on an annual assessment of wealth and assets published by Forbes every April. The vast majority of Cypriot billionaires are not native Cypriots, but are foreign billionaires who acquired Cypriot citizenship (either through the now-defunct Cyprus Investment Program or otherwise) to take advantage of the country's tax laws.

== 2026 ==
Source: 2026 The World's Billionaires

Ranking in Cyprus	World position	Name	Citizenship	Net worth (USD)	Sources of wealth
1	87	Vinod Adani	Cyprus; India	27.6 billion	Adani Group
2	127	John Fredriksen	Cyprus (since 2006); Norway (until 2006)	21.5 billion	Seadrill
3	1059	Yakir Gabay	Cyprus; Israel	4 billion	Aroundtown
4	1766	Igor Makarov	Cyprus; Russia (until 2023)	4 billion	ARETI International Group
5	2473	Vladimir Krupchak	Cyprus; Russia	1.6 billion	Arkhangelsk Pulp and Paper Mill (APPM)
6	2788	Sergey Dmitriev	Cyprus; Russia (until 2023)	1.4 billion	JetBrains
7	2815	Stelios Haji-Ioannou	Cyprus	1.4 billion	EasyJet
8	2920	Polys Haji-Ioannou	Cyprus	1.3 billion	EasyJet
9	3132	Clelia Haji-Ioannou	Cyprus	1.2 billion	EasyJet

== 2024 ==
Source: 2024 The World's Billionaires

Ranking in Cyprus	World position	Name	Citizenship	Net worth (USD)	Sources of wealth
1	63	Vinod Adani	Cyprus; India	26.6 billion	Adani Group
2	133	John Fredriksen	Cyprus	14.3 billion	Seadrill
3	842	Yakir Gabay	Cyprus; Israel	3.6 billion	Aroundtown
4	1264	Sergey Dmitriev	Cyprus	2.5 billion	JetBrains
5	1503	Igor Makarov	Cyprus	2.1 billion	ARETI International Group
6	1689	Valentin Kipyatkov	Cyprus	1.8 billion	JetBrains
7	2320	Polys Haji-Ioannou	Cyprus	1.2 billion	EasyJet
8	2430	Stelios Haji-Ioannou	Cyprus	1.1 billion	EasyJet
9	2481	Clelia Haji-Ioannou	Cyprus	1.1 billion	EasyJet

== 2023 Cypriot billionaires ==
source: 2023 The World's Billionaires

Ranking in Cyprus	World position	Name	Citizenship	Net worth (USD)	Sources of wealth
1	130	John Fredriksen	Cyprus; Norway	13.1 billion	Seadrill
2	184	Vinod Adani	Cyprus; India	12.4 billion	Adani Group
3	378	Viktor Vekselberg	Cyprus; Russia	6.6 billion	Metal, energy
4	400	Dmitry Rybolovlev	Cyprus; Russia	6.4 billion	Fertilizer
5	440	Alexander Abramov	Cyprus; Russia	6 billion	Steel
6	766	Yakir Gabay	Cyprus; Israel	3.4 billion	Aroundtown
7	1579	Alexander Ponomarenko	Cyprus; Russia	2.6 billion	Real estate, airport
8	1217	Sergey Dmitriev	Cyprus	2.5 billion	JetBrains
9	1226	Oleg Deripaska	Cyprus; Russia	2.5 billion	Aluminium, Utility
10	1647	Valentin Kipyatkov	Cyprus	1.8 billion	JetBrains
11	2405	Polys Haji-Ioannou	Cyprus	1.1 billion	EasyJet
12	2540	Clelia Haji-Ioannou	Cyprus	1 billion	EasyJet
13	2540	Stelios Haji-Ioannou	Cyprus	1 billion	EasyJet

== 2022 Cypriot billionaires ==
source: 2022 The World's Billionaires

Ranking in Cyprus	World position	Name	Citizenship	Net worth (USD)	Sources of wealth
1	202	John Fredriksen	Cyprus; Norway	10.8 billion	Seadrill (Oil tankers and Deepwater drilling rigs)
2	708	Yakir Gabay	Cyprus; Israel	4.4 billion	Aroundtown (German Real Estate Company)
3	2557	Stelios Haji-Ioannou	Cyprus; Greece	1.1 billion	EasyJet

== 2021 Cypriot billionaires ==
source: 2021 The World's Billionaires

Ranking in Cyprus	World position	Name	Citizenship	Net worth (USD)	Sources of wealth
1	230	John Fredriksen	Cyprus; Norway	10.2 billion	Seadrill (Oil tankers and Deepwater drilling rigs)
2	670	Yakir Gabay	Cyprus; Israel	4.4 billion	Aroundtown (German Real Estate Company)
3		Yiannakis "John" Christodoulou	Cyprus; United Kingdom	2.8 billion	Yianis Group (Real Estate Company)
4	1506	Suat Günsel	Cyprus	2 billion	Near East University (Education facility)
5	2277	Stelios Haji-Ioannou	Cyprus; Greece	1.1 billion	EasyJet
6	2315	Clelia Haji-Ioannou	Cyprus	1.1 billion	EasyJet

== 2020 Cypriot billionaires ==
source: 2020 The World's Billionaires

Ranking in Cyprus	Name	Citizenship	Net worth (USD)	Sources of wealth
1	John Fredriksen	Cyprus; Norway	9.6 billion	Seadrill (Oil tankers and Deepwater drilling rigs)
2	Yakir Gabay	Cyprus; Israel	3.2 billion	Aroundtown (German Real Estate Company)
3	Suat Günsel	Cyprus	2 billion	Near East University (Education facility)

== 2019 Cypriot billionaires ==
Ranking in Cyprus	Name	Citizenship	Net worth (USD)	Sources of wealth
1	John Fredriksen	Cyprus; Norway	9 billion	Shipping
2	Teddy Sagi	Cyprus; Israel	10.8 billion	Playtech
3	Oleg Deripaska	Cyprus; Russia	3.8 billion	Basic Element
4	Yakir Gabay	Cyprus; Israel	3.7 billion	Aroundtown
5	Alexander Ponomarenko	Cyprus; Russia	3.2 billion	Sheremetyevo
6	Suat Gunsel	Cyprus	1.8 billion	Near East University, University of Kyrenia
7	Stelios Haji-Ioannou	Cyprus; Greece	1.3 billion	EasyJet
8	Polys Haji-Ioannou	Cyprus	1.1 billion	EasyJet, Polyar Tankers
9	Nikita Mishin	Cyprus; Russia	1.1 billion	Globaltrans
10	Ihor Kolomoyskyi	Cyprus; Ukraine	1 billion	Private Bank

== 2016 Cypriot billionaires ==
source: 2016 Cyprus billionaires

Ranking in Cyprus	Name	Citizenship	Net worth (USD)	Sources of wealth
1	John Fredriksen	Cyprus; Norway	9 billion	Shipping
2	Stelios Haji-Ioannou	Cyprus; Greece	1.46 billion	EasyJet and Stelmar shipping
3	Polys Haji-Ioannou	Cyprus	1.3 billion	EasyJet, Polyar Tankers
4	Clelia Haji-Ioannou	Cyprus	1.09 billion	EasyJet, Real Estate
4	Suat Gunsel	Cyprus	1.09 billion	Near East University, University of Kyrenia

== See also ==
- Economy of Cyprus
- List of wealthiest families
- List of countries by number of billionaires
- List of Greeks by net worth
