= Hatziioannou =

Hatziioannou or Haji-Ioannou (Greek: Χατζηιωάννου) is a Greek surname. Notable people with the surname include:

- Clelia Haji-Ioannou (born 1970/71), Cypriot billionaire
- Leon Hatziioannou (born 1965), Canadian football player
- Loucas Haji-Ioannou (1927–2008), Greek-Cypriot shipping entrepreneur
- Polys Haji-Ioannou (born 1959/60), Cypriot billionaire
- Stelios Haji-Ioannou (born 1967), British Cypriot billionaire
