= Smedvig (surname) =

Smedvig is a Norwegian surname. Notable people with the surname include:

- Anna Margaret Smedvig (born 1983), Norwegian businesswoman
- Peder Smedvig (1882–1959), Norwegian businessman
- Peter Smedvig (born 1946), Norwegian businessman
- Rolf Smedvig (1952–2015), American musician
- Torolf Smedvig (1917-1977), Norwegian businessman
