= Vantris Energy =

Malaysian integrated oil and gas services company

Vantris Energy Berhad
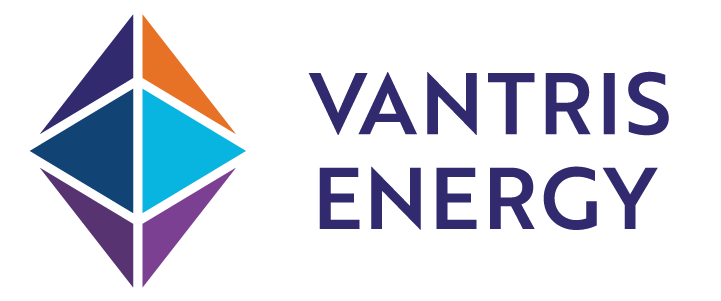

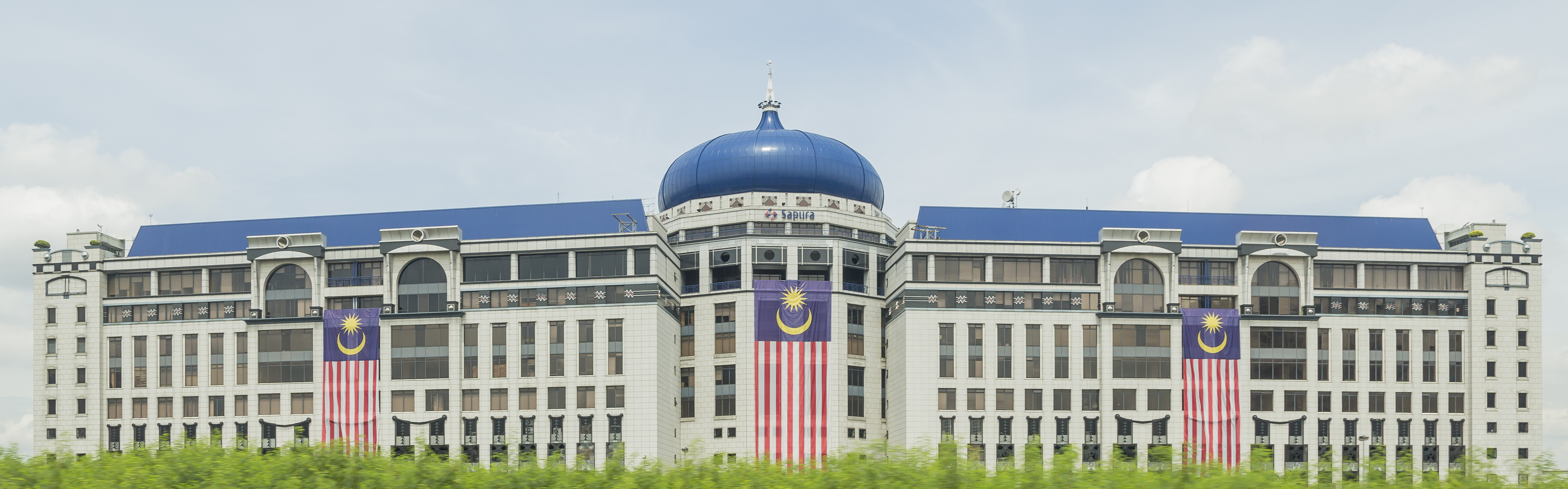
- The headquarter of Vantris Energy Berhad, then SapuraKencana Petroleum in 2014
- Formerly: SapuraKencana Petroleum Berhad (2012–2017); Sapura Energy Berhad (2017–2025)
- Type: Public limited company
- Traded as: MYX: 5218
- ISIN: MYL5218OO002
- Industry: Oilfield services
- Predecessor: SapuraCrest Petroleum Berhad; Kencana Petroleum Berhad
- Founded: 15 May 2012; 14 years ago (merger between SapuraCrest and Kencana)
- Founder: Tan Sri Shahril Shamsuddin
- Headquarters: No. 7, Jalan Tasik, Mines Resort City, 43300 Seri Kembangan, Selangor, Malaysia
- Key people: Shahin Farouque Bin Jammal Ahmad (Chairman); Muhammad Zamri Jusoh (CEO)
- Revenue: ▲RM4.703 billion (FY ended January 31, 2025)
- Operating income: ▲RM0.310 billion (FY ended January 31, 2025)
- Net income: ▲RM0.068 billion (FY ended January 31, 2025)
- Total assets: ▲RM14.406 billion (FY ended January 31, 2025)
- Total equity: ▲ –RM3.061 billion (FY ended January 31, 2025)
- Parent: Sapura Group
- Website: www.sapuraenergy.com

Vantris Energy Berhad (formerly known as Sapura Energy Berhad from 2017 to 2025 and SapuraKencana Petroleum Berhad from 2012 to 2017) is a Malaysian integrated oil and gas services company based in Menara PNB, Kuala Lumpur. Sapura Energy trades in over 20 countries, such as China, Australia, United States of America, and those in Western Africa and the Middle East, employing approximately 13,000 people. Sapura Energy's operations cover exploration, development, production, rejuvenation, decommissioning, and abandonment. The company was formed via a merger between SapuraCrest and Kencana in May 2012 and trades on the Main Market of Bursa Malaysia Securities Berhad. The company was renamed as Sapura Energy Berhad on 24 March 2017. The company was later renamed again from Sapura Energy Berhad to Vantris Energy Berhad on 1 August 2025.

== History ==
=== Formation and early history (2012–2015) ===
SapuraKencana was formed after the merger between SapuraCrest and also Kencana in May 2012. At the time of the merge, the company become Malaysian largest Oil & Gas service provider, and among the top five of the world largest Oil & Gas service provider, based on asset value. SapuraCrest specialized in oil & gas exploration, offshore installation and offshore support vessels, while Kencana's specialized in offshore structure design and engineering, fabrication and offshore hook up and commissioning.

On December 29, 2013, SapuraKencana share price reached its peak at RM4.96, the firm's market capitalization reached RM28.5 billion, and becoming the second largest oil & gas services provider, only behind to Italy's Saipem S.p.A.. But following the 2014 oil shock, due to oversupply of oil and increased production from OPEC which saw the price of crude oil tanked more than 40%, significantly impacted Sapura Energy's revenue and profitability. The company's reliance on drilling and exploration activities made it particularly vulnerable to this decline. In addition, the company aggressive expansion through debt-funded acquisitions, including the US$2.83 billion purchase of Seadrill Ltd's tender rig business in 2013 and the US$900 million acquisition of Newfield Exploration's assets, increased the firm financial risk and gearing. As a result, the share price of the company tanked more than 50% from the peak of RM4.96 in December 2013 to RM2.27 by December 2014, losing more than RM10 billion in market capitalization.

=== Financial difficulties and COVID-19 pandemic (2016–2023) ===
The further worsening of oil prices, which tanked to $34.62, reaching an 11-year low in January 2016, placed additional pressure on the company's financial position, resulting in significant impairment of its assets. These assets, mostly acquired through debt financing during the peak of oil prices, caused the company to suffer substantial financial losses. For the fiscal year ended 31 January 2016, the company reported an impairment loss of RM2.029 billion, leading to a net loss of RM791.445 million, compared to a net profit of RM1.433 billion in the previous year. By 2016, the company's gearing ratio stood at 134.15%, with net debt of RM16.38 billion against total equity of RM12.21 billion.

In March 2017, the company was renamed Sapura Energy Berhad, in an effort to enhance its brand image. However, financial difficulties persisted even after the name change. In 2017, the firm reported a net profit of RM206.164 million, primarily due to a decline in revenue, which was offset by a reduction in asset impairment. In 2018, the company suffered a net loss of RM2.505 billion, largely driven by an asset impairment of RM2.132 billion.

The COVID-19 pandemic, which began in March 2020, further strained the company's finances, primarily due to supply chain disruptions, project delays affecting gross profit, high financing costs to service its debts and also declined in oil price. For FY2022, ended 31 January, the company recorded a net loss of RM9.060 billion, mainly due to a RM1.245 billion decline in revenue, from RM5.348 billion to RM4.100 billion, a RM1.534 billion increase in cost of sales, from RM4.730 billion to RM6.264 billion and an impairment loss of RM5.606 billion. These factors evaporated Sapura Energy's shareholder equity, which fell from RM8.936 billion to just RM0.078 billion, a decline of 99.1%. As of 25 March 2022, the company's share price stood at only 3 cents, having fallen 99.39% from its peak of RM4.96 on December 29, 2013. Due to its troubled financial health and shareholder equity less than 50% of its share capital, the company was classified as a PN17 company on May 31, 2022.

=== Post-pandemic and rebrand as Vantris Energy (2023–present) ===
The fiscal year 2023, saw Sapura Energy shareholder equity falls below zero for the first time, at negative RM2.906 billion, after another net loss of RM3.176 billion. On August 1, 2025, the company change its name from Sapura Energy Berhad to Vantris Energy Berhad, in attempt to rebrand the company image amid financial difficulties.

== Core businesses ==
=== Engineering and Construction ===
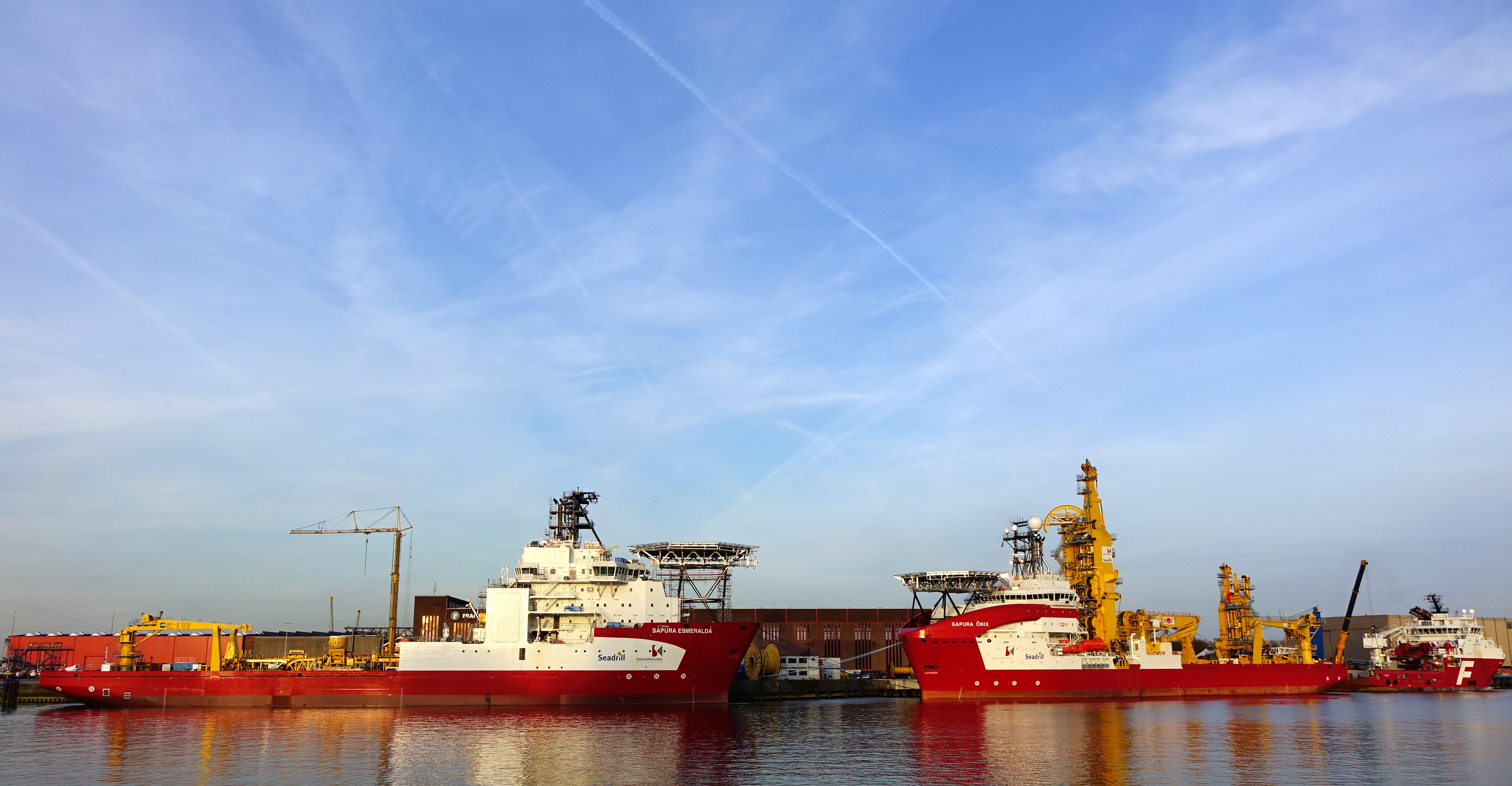
Sapura Energy oil exploration ships

One of Sapura Energy's core businesses is Engineering and Construction, which includes the creation of offshore platforms and marine pipelines for oil exploration. It is supported by a strategic group of assets such as pipelaying vessels, six of which are in full operation for Petróleo Brasileiro S.A. (Petrobras) in Brazil. The vessels are fitted with remotely operated vehicles (ROVs) developed and built by Total Marine Technology Pty Ltd (TMT), an Australian subsidiary of SapuraKencana.

=== Operations and Maintenance ===
Through its engineering, procurement, construction, installation, and commissioning (EPCIC) solutions, Sapura Energy also offers its clients in the oil and gas industry operations and maintenance (O&M) services. Its offshore support services ranges from topside maintenance, subsea services, brownfield rejuvenation, and geosurvey and geotechnical, to the provision of offshore support vessels.

=== Drilling and Completion ===
The world's largest owner and operator of tender rigs, Sapura Energy maintains more than 50% of the global market share. In 2013, Sapura Energy bought $2.9 billion worth of tender rigs from deepwater drilling company Seadrill, further expanding the company's tender rig business. The company has over four decades of experience in tender-assist drilling operations and drills more than 400 wells in a year.

=== Exploration and Production ===
Sapura Energy is also known for its exploration and production of oil and gas. In 2014, the company's energy division was able to lift 5.1 million barrels of oil equivalent from Peninsula Malaysia fields. In the same year, it achieved a 100% exploration success rate due to its five significant gas discoveries in Sarawak’s SK408 project, resulting in more than three trillion cubic feet of gas.

== Ownership ==
Sapura Energy Berhad is a public limited liability company. As of 2017, the number of shareholders totals to 37,217 with Sapura Technology Sdn Bhd retaining 13.37% and the Citigroup Nominees (Tempatan) Sdn Bhd Employees Provident Fund Board holding 10.06% of the shares.

The chairman of the board of directors is Hamzah Bakar while until 2021, the company's president and Group Chief Executive Officer was Shahril Shamsuddin, who also served on the board of directors and the President and Group Chief Executive Officer of Sapura Group.

== See also ==
- List of oilfield service companies
