= Anna Margaret Smedvig =

Norwegian businesswoman (born 1983)

- Born: October 1983 (age 42)
- Education: University of Edinburgh
- Occupation: Businesswoman
- Known for: Chairman, Smedvig Capital
- Parent(s): Peter Smedvig; Esther Smedvig

Anna Margaret Smedvig (born October 1983) is a Norwegian businesswoman, multi-millionaire and chairman of Smedvig Capital based in the United Kingdom.

Smedvig is also the executive chairman of the Smedvig group of companies, which includes Smedvig Property and the Smedvig Family Office.

A resident in the UK since the early 1990s, she and her father Peter Smedvig are estimated to be worth £847 million by the Sunday Times Rich List. She is one of Norway's richest women.

== Early life ==
Smedvig is the only child of Esther Smedvig and Peter Smedvig. In 1996, her father founded Smedvig Capital where she now serves as chairman.

She is also the granddaughter of Torolf Smedvig and great-granddaughter of Peder Smedvig. In 1915, Peder Smedvig founded Smedvig ASA, an offshore oil rig company.

Her grandmother was Nora Kluge, who was the daughter of Norwegian supreme court judge Kristofer Nordahl Kluge. In the early 1990s, she moved to London with her parents.

Smedvig studied at the University of Edinburgh and graduated with an MA in Psychology and Business.

== Career ==
=== Smedvig Capital ===
Smedvig currently serves as the Chairman of Smedvig Capital, which is a London-based investment firm. She took up the position in 2016. Founded in 1996, Smedvig Capital has invested over £1 billion in British and Nordic firms.

Anna Margaret is also the Executive Chairman of the Smedvig group of companies, which includes Smedvig Property and the Smedvig Family Office.

=== Other ===
Smedvig previously worked for L Catterton, Smythson and EC Hambro Rabben.

== Personal life ==
Smedvig lives in London with her husband, but remains a Norwegian citizen.

She is interested in fashion, film, architecture and design.
