= Smedvik =

Smedvik is a Norwegian surname. Notable people with the surname include:

- Harald Smedvik (1888–1956), Norwegian gymnast
- Ragnvald Smedvik (1894–1975), Norwegian footballer

== See also ==
- Smedvig (surname)
