= Golden Ocean Group =

Norwegian shipping company

Golden Ocean Group Limited
- Type: Public
- Traded as: OSE: GOGL; Nasdaq: GOGL
- Industry: Shipping
- Founded: 2004; 22 years ago
- Headquarters: Hamilton, Bermuda
- Key people: Ola Lorentzon (chairman); John Fredriksen (director)
- Products: Dry bulk shipping
- Revenue: US $885.77 million (2023)
- Net income: US $112.27 million (2023)
- Total assets: US $3.489 billion (end 2023)
- Total equity: US $1.922 billion (end 2023)
- Owner: John Fredriksen (39.6%)
- Number of employees: 48
- Subsidiaries: Golden Ocean Trading Ltd. Golden Ocean Management Ltd. United Freight Carriers LLC
- Website: goldenocean.bm

Golden Ocean Group Limited is a Bermuda-registered, Norway- based dry bulk shipping company.

== History ==
The company was created as a demerged part of Frontline in 2004 and is listed on Nasdaq and the Oslo Stock Exchange. 39.6% of the company was owned by John Fredriksen until mid-2025.

The company owns one of the largest dry bulk fleets in the world.

Management of the fleet is carried out by the Norwegian company Golden Ocean Group Management AS led by Interim CEO Peder Simonsen.

Golden Ocean was taken over by shipping firm CMB.TECH in August 2025 and delisted.
