= Eastern Drilling =

Offshore drilling contractor

Eastern Drilling ASA
- Industry: Petroleum industry
- Founded: 2004; 22 years ago
- Defunct: 2007; 19 years ago
- Fate: Acquired by Seadrill
- Headquarters: Grimstad, Norway
- Key people: Arve Andersson, CEO
- Services: Offshore drilling

Eastern Drilling was an offshore drilling contractor headquartered in Grimstad, Norway. In May 2007, Seadrill acquired the company.

== History ==
The company was founded in 2004.

In 2005, Smedvig acquired a 10% stake in the company.

In November 2006, the company signed a $558 million contract for use of its to-be-constructed drilling rig by Total S.A. The rig was being constructed by Samsung Heavy Industries.

In May 2007, Seadrill acquired the company.
