= Meir Shmuel Gabay =

Israeli civil servant (1933–2010)

- Born: June 26, 1933; Jerusalem, Israel
- Died: March 7, 2010 (aged 76); Jerusalem
- Resting place: Jerusalem
- Spouse: Yemima Peretz Gabay
- Children: Raanan, Gil, Yakir
- Parent(s): Eliezer, Reina

Meir Shmuel Gabay (Hebrew: מאיר שמואל גבאי; 26 June 1933 – 7 March 2010) International and Israeli Civil servant, the first, and so far the only Israeli to be elected by the United Nations General Assembly to any office. He was President of the United Nations Administrative Tribunal (2000–2002), President of United Nations Association of Israel (?–2010), co-chairperson of the Interreligious Coordinating Council in Israel (ICCI), Chairman of the Council of The International Association of Jewish Lawyers and Jurists, Civil Service Commissioner of Israel (1987–1994), and Director General of the Ministry of Justice (1976–1987).

== Early life and family ==
Gabay was born in Jerusalem, Israel to a family of Sephardi descent. Following the Spanish expulsion the family was expelled from Kingdom of Castile and resettled in Gaza. After the 1799 retreat of the Napoleonic troupes, Gaza Jews were condemned for breach of the limitations of their tolerated inferior status as dhimmi by associating with the French. According to Islamic jurisprudence, jihad led to a massacre of the Gaza Jews. The surviving members of the Castel family fled and resettled in Hebron. In the 1929 Hebron massacre the family was saved by a Muslim friend.

Following the massacre, the family was expelled by the British army, and resettled in Jerusalem. Shortly after this, Meir Samuel was born and named after his grandfather Hakham Meir Shmuel Castel Av Beit Din of Hebron, who was slain together with four of his students and Meir's grandmother Rivka. In the massacre, the family lost its house and source of income.

In the 1936 riots Meir's father's cloth shop was burned again. In the 1947 riots Meir's father and his brother were almost burned in their shop, only to be saved at the last minute by the Jewish defense force. Nevertheless, his father, Eliezer, maintained lifelong contact with his Muslim friends and business associates. Meir's uncle, Rishon LeZion Jacob Meir, who had been decorated by the Ottoman sultan and by Hussein bin Ali, King of Hejaz, was well respected by his Muslim and Christian colleagues. During the 1936 riots, Jacob Meir made an "Appeal for Friendliness" calling on the Muslims of Jerusalem to halt any hatred and animosity towards Jews.

Gabay's mother tongue was Ladino, and later he learned modern Castilian Spanish, Hebrew, Arabic, English, and French.

In 1961 Gabay married Yemima Peretz, who later became head of the clemency department in the Israeli ministry of Justice.

== Education and research ==
Gabay graduated with distinction from the Hebrew University of Jerusalem Law School, and gained his first professional experience under Justice Moshe Landau and Justice Alfred Vitkon. Gabay was one of a group of promising assistants to Prof Justice Zeev Tzeltner, one of the founders of the Tel Aviv University faculty of Law. Gabay assisted Tzeltner to publish his book on contract law. In 1961 Gabay won a Fulbright scholarship and subsequently received a master's degree in Comparative Law from Columbia University, New York. He did a major study on International Transactions at the London School of Economics.

== Career ==
Gabay worked from 1962 to 1969 in the United Nations Secretariat on legal aspects of international economic relations and intellectual property issues. During these years he organized several international conferences, and assisted several nations in establishing their legal system. He took part in many international conferences dealing with human rights, international law, international trade and intellectual property law.

In 1969 he returned to Israel where he was appointed as Israel Commissioner of Patent Trademarks and Copyright, and Deputy Attorney General of Israel (which included judicial powers and responsibilities). From 1976 to 1987 he was the Director General of the Ministry of Justice and Chairperson of the Auditor's Council. Gabay served under six consecutive ministers of different political parties (Zadok, Begin, Tamir, Nisim, Modaii, and Sarir). In 1985 he won a medal from the US Congress for his part in negotiating the Israel–United States Free Trade Agreement. In 1987 he served briefly as chairperson of Israel Securities Authority. Following the unity government coalition agreement, which specified five key positions that required consensus nomination, Gabay was nominated as Civil Service Commissioner of Israel.

Following his retirement from the Israeli civil service in 1994, he joined the law firm of Abraham Neeman & Co., where he mostly dealt with international commercial issues. During 1998 he served as a sole arbitrator, appointed by the International Chamber of Commerce (ICC), in a major arbitration between Spanish, British and Indian companies. He was designated a member of the World Bank Pool of Arbitrators under the International Centre for Settlement of Investment Disputes. Gabay was designated as a potential panelist for dispute resolution under the Agreement on Trade-Related Aspects of Intellectual Property Rights(TRIPS) in the World Trade Organization (WTO).

Gabay chaired many public committees in Israel, including the Committee to Check the Prohibitions for Abortions, 1974; the Committee for Proposed Legislative Arrangements in the Capital Market, 1985; Public Committee for Property Tax Issues, 1997; the Patent and Copyright Laws Revision Committees in Israel, 1987; and the commission regarding the new copyright law, 1998. During the 1980s Gabay was a member of the Israeli team negotiating the autonomy plan with Egypt under the Camp David Accords. Following the Madrid Conference of 1991 he was a member of the Israeli team negotiating with the Palestinians' interim self-government arrangements, to be followed by permanent status negotiations. This eventually led to the Oslo Accords. Gabay negotiated on behalf of Israel the contract concerning the establishment of the Baháʼí Universal House of Justice in Haifa.

During the early 1990s Gabay was a member of the Israeli delegation to the United Nations. In November 1993 he was elected as a judge in the United Nations Administrative Tribunal. In 1997 he was elected as vice president of the tribunal, and in 2000 he was elected president of the tribunal, until his retirement in 2002.

For many years prior to his death in 2010, Gabay served as President of United Nations Association of Israel, co-chairperson of the Interreligious Coordinating Council in Israel (ICCI), Chairman of the Council of the International Association of Jewish Lawyers and Jurists, a member of the Consultative Commission on Arbitration and Conciliation in the World Intellectual Property Organization (WIPO), and the Israeli delegate in the ICC International Court of Arbitration.

Parallel to his career, Gabay was a senior lecturer on Intellectual Property and International Trade Law at the Universities of Jerusalem and Tel Aviv.

== Cultural heritage ==
Gabay was proud of his family’s heritage. For several years he served as chairman of the board of trustees of Mishgav Yerushalayim, The Center for Research and Study of Sephardi and Oriental Jewish Heritage. Gabay led the merger of Mishgav Yerushalayim with the Center for Jewish studies at the Hebrew University of Jerusalem. He served on the board of trustees of the National Authority of Ladino, as well as on the board of the Misgav Ladach Hospital In Jerusalem.

== Legacy ==
Gabay believed in taking active responsibility to enhance international, interracial, and inter denominational friendship and collaboration. He strongly believed in democracy, human rights, and Zionism, and the positive role of the Jewish nation and the state of Israel in the Middle East and the world.
