= Julie J. Robertson =

American entrepreneur and businesswoman (born 1956)

- Born: April 25, 1956; Texas, United States
- Education: Bachelor of Journalism at University of Texas at Austin; Advanced Management program at Harvard School of Business
- Occupations: Chair of the Board of Seadrill; Independent director of EOG Resources; 2020's Chair of IADC

Julie Johnson Robertson is an American entrepreneur and businesswoman. She is the chair of the Board of Seadrill one of the world's largest offshore drilling companies. Previously, Robertson served as executive Chairman, chairman, President and chief executive officer (CEO) of the company from January 2018 until May 2020. She is also an Independent Director at EOG Resources one of the largest crude oil and natural gas exploration and production companies in the United States. In 2020, Ms. Robertson was elected the first female Chair of the International Association of Drilling Contractors (IADC).

== Seizing the advantage of the downturn ==
In June 1979, Robertson began her career with Bawden Drilling, a predecessor subsidiary of Noble. She started there writing maintenance and drill pipe manuals.

A few years later, the drilling industry fell into a deep downturn. Robertson founds herself with more responsibilities as she was taking tasks in the Risk Managements, human resources, and even marketing in addition to her main job of writing manuals. These additional responsibilities were an opportunity to her to learn the business and understand the big picture of the drilling industry.

== Management philosophy ==
Ms. Robertson experienced working from the bottom of an organisation, all the way to top management. This experience shaped her 'management philosophy' in supporting the 3000 employees at Noble corporation which she expressed in an interview: Every day I know I have 3,000 employees depending on me for their livelihood and that of their families. That’s a responsibility that I take very seriously. Each day I’m focused on our customers, our stakeholders and our employees. It’s the first thing I think about every morning and the last thing I think about at night.

== Honours ==
For her distinguished achievements within the drilling industry, Ms. Robertson received the 2013 IADC Contractor of the Year award from Clay Williams, the NOV president and chief operating officer, in presenting the award. For her dedication to the Energy industry and the community at large, Ms. Robertson received the 2022 Spindletop Founders Award.
