= Peter Smedvig =

Norwegian businessman

- Born: Peter Thomas Smedvig; August 1946 (age 80)
- Education: Newcastle University; Wharton School of Finance and Commerce, University of Pennsylvania
- Occupation: businessman
- Known for: founder of Smedvig Capital, and chairman of Smedvig ASA
- Parent: Torolf Smedvig
- Relatives: Peder Smedvig (grandfather)

Peter Thomas Smedvig (born August 1946), is a Norwegian billionaire businessman, the founder of Smedvig Capital, and the chairman of Smedvig ASA, which was founded by his grandfather, Peder Smedvig.

== Early life ==
Peter Thomas Smedvig was born in Stavanger in August 1946. He has received a bachelor's degree from the Newcastle University in 1970, and an MBA from the Wharton School of Finance and Commerce, University of Pennsylvania in 1972.

== Career ==
In 1996, he co-founded Smedvig Capital with Johnny Hewett.

He is the principal owner of Smedvig ASA and Scana Industrier ASA.

== Personal life ==
His daughter is Anna Margaret Smedvig.
