= John Fredriksen =

Norwegian-born Cypriot shipping magnate (born 1944)

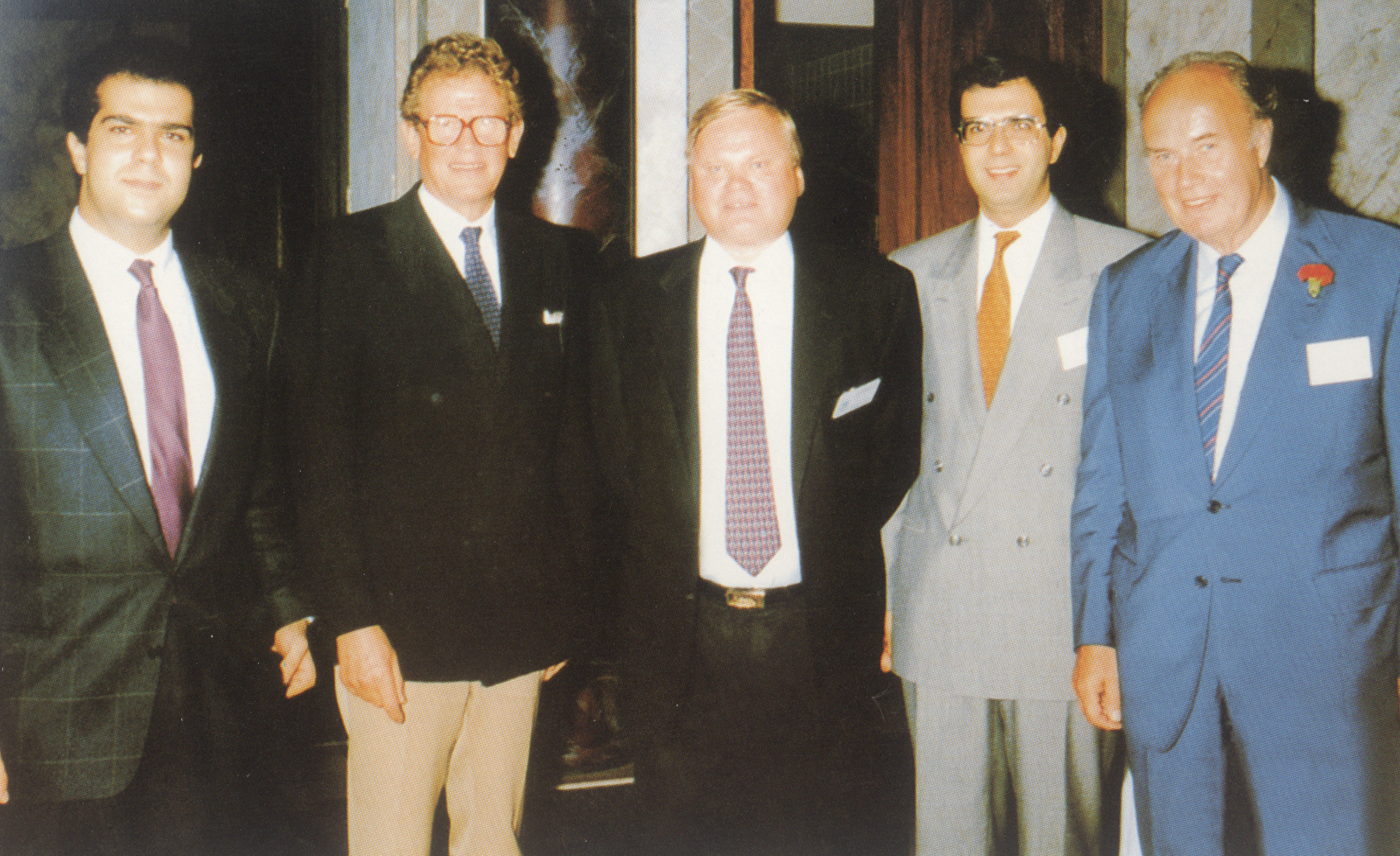
- Fredriksen (center) meeting Greek shipowners in 1989
- Born: 11 May 1944 (age 82); Eidsvoll, Norway
- Citizenship: Cyprus (since 2006); Norway (until 2006)
- Occupations: Businessman, shipping magnate
- Years active: 1960s–present
- Known for: World's largest oil tanker fleet
- Title: Chairman of Frontline plc
- Spouse: Inger Astrup Fredriksen (m. 1977; died 2006)
- Children: 2 (Kathrine and Cecilie)

John Fredriksen (born 11 May 1944) is a Norwegian-born Cypriot oil tanker and shipping billionaire businessman based in the United Arab Emirates. He owns the world's largest oil tanker fleet through his flagship company Frontline plc, and has major interests in the offshore drilling contractor Seadrill, the fish farming company Mowi (the world's largest salmon producer), and the dry bulk shipping company Golden Ocean Group.

Through his investment companies Hemen Holdings and Geveran Trading, Fredriksen controls a global maritime empire encompassing oil tankers, dry bulk carriers, liquefied natural gas (LNG) vessels, and offshore drilling rigs. Born in Eidsvoll, Norway, Fredriksen is now a naturalised Cypriot citizen. Before renouncing his Norwegian citizenship in 2006, he was Norway's richest man. As of 2025, Forbes estimates his net worth at US$17 billion, making him one of the wealthiest individuals globally.

In 2012, he was included in the 50 Most Influential list of Bloomberg Markets Magazine, and in 2014, Lloyd's List named him among the top 10 most influential people in the global shipping industry.

== Early life ==
Fredriksen was born on 10:32pm 11 May 1944 in Eidsvoll, Norway. His father, Gunnar Fredriksen (1918–2018), was a welder at NSB (Norwegian State Railways), and his mother, Herdis Johanne Ørbæk (1920–1991), was a canteen manager. He came to Oslo at age three and grew up in Vålerenga, a working-class district in eastern Oslo.

In 1961, Fredriksen began his shipping career as a messenger at the shipbroker firm Blehr & Tenvig in Oslo. He studied for his commercial diploma at evening school while working. After gaining experience abroad, he became a tank broker at A.O. Andersen in Oslo in 1966, then rose to deputy chief and later chief of the traditional shipping firm Wallem & Co. in Singapore in 1968. When British interests acquired Wallem in autumn 1969, Fredriksen returned to Oslo as a tank broker at Anco Tanker Service, where he was regarded as a promising and capable broker with a talent for quick decisions.

== Career ==
=== Early career and oil trading (1960s–1970s) ===
During his overseas postings, Fredriksen made important contacts. In Singapore, he met shipowner Jan Petter Røed (1932–2022), who taught him that money could also be made operating older tonnage. In autumn 1971, Fredriksen established his first Liberia-registered company, Northern Tankers Inc., followed by Ocean Tanker Co. Inc. in 1974.

In 1973, after the Anco partnership dissolved, Fredriksen became head of the tank department at Joachim Grieg & Co.'s Oslo office. That summer, he experienced one of history's strongest upswings in tanker shipping, though the oil crisis that October led to a severe and prolonged freight collapse. He acquired long-term tanker charter contracts during the Yom Kippur War and made US$40 million when prices rebounded five years later.

In spring 1975, Fredriksen established the shipbroker firm Northern Shipping AS, which had a lucrative partnership with Arab interests who provided large quantities of oil for transport. In 1978, he emigrated from Norway to London. His partners were bought out and Northern Shipping's operations were taken over by the newly established Lancaster Maritime Ltd. in London, owned by his Liberia company Northern Tankers Inc.

=== Iran–Iraq War and fortune building (1980s) ===
In 1981, Fredriksen acquired two chemical tankers and a large oil tanker, marking the true start of his shipowning career. The freight collapse that same year made profitable operation difficult, and Fredriksen targeted markets that were risky both militarily and politically—including oil transport to the politically isolated apartheid regime in South Africa.

In 1982, Fredriksen established Marine Management AS in Oslo to operate ships for foreign owners—essentially for himself and his partners. He exploited the high freight rates in the Persian Gulf created by the Iran–Iraq War. Iran financed its weapons purchases through oil exports and paid well to have the oil transported out of the war zone. Fredriksen deployed three supertankers in shuttle traffic from the Iranian oil port of Kharg Island.

To minimise fuel costs, his ships used unconventional methods: on ships carrying diesel, simple methods reduced recorded cargo intake, with the unrecorded surplus pumped into fuel tanks; on ships with crude oil cargo, the thick residual waste was pumped up and mixed with bunker fuel instead of being discharged at sea. The explosive gases in crude oil made this mixture dangerous, but it saved the company millions.

The Kharg traffic was hazardous—in autumn 1985, a rocket attack on one of the ships killed two and injured two; in February 1986, two more were killed and three wounded. In total, nine Fredriksen ships were hit by rockets. As described by his biographers Odd Harald Hauge and Gunnar Stavrum in Storeulv (2005), "he was the lifeline to the Ayatollah." His regular table at Oslo's fashionable Theatercaféen restaurant was nicknamed "Kharg Island" in reference to his controversial but lucrative business.

=== Frontline and tanker dominance (1996–present) ===
In 1996, Hemen Holding Limited, a company indirectly controlled by trusts established by Fredriksen for the benefit of his immediate family, became the majority shareholder in Frontline AB, a Swedish shipping company founded in 1985. Frontline AB was subsequently re-domiciled from Sweden to Bermuda and listed on the Oslo Stock Exchange in May 1997.

Through a series of acquisitions and purchases of new and secondhand tankers, Frontline became the world's largest tanker company. Fredriksen reportedly considered quitting the tanker business in 1996 after his ship, Sea Empress, spilled 50,000 tonnes of oil off the coast of Wales. Instead, he increased his investment, buying double-hulled vessels that are more resistant to spills. Today, his fleet is dominated by costly double-hulled, environmentally safer tankers.

In August 2001, Frontline shares began trading on the New York Stock Exchange. The company delivered strong shareholder returns during the tanker boom years of the late 1990s and mid-2000s, supported by high freight rates and large dividend distributions to investors.

However, the 2008 financial crisis and subsequent oversupply of vessels led to a severe downturn in the tanker market. Day rates for leasing tankers slumped 47% from 2010, with charter rates sinking to $7,254 per day in September 2011 from their 2007 highs. Frontline lost US$530 million on US$810 million in revenue in 2011.

In December 2011, Fredriksen rescued his flagship tanker company by splitting it in two, transferring 11 of Frontline's best ships and US$666 million in debt into a new firm, Frontline 2012 Ltd., backed by a US$505 million guarantee from Hemen Holding. In 2015, the two companies merged back together, with Frontline 2012 becoming a wholly-owned subsidiary of Frontline. As of 2025, Fredriksen holds approximately a 36% stake in Frontline through Hemen Holding.

=== Seadrill and offshore drilling (2005–present) ===
Anticipating a surge in deepwater exploration during the mid-2000s oil boom, Fredriksen founded Seadrill Limited on 10 May 2005 with an initial US$200 million equity investment. The company was incorporated in Bermuda and shares began trading on the Oslo Stock Exchange on 22 November 2005.

In September 2006, Seadrill acquired a controlling share of Smedvig ASA, a Norwegian drilling firm, for approximately US$2.7 billion by outbidding Noble Corporation. This acquisition, Fredriksen's largest deal ever, added premium jack-up rigs and semi-submersibles to Seadrill's portfolio.

The 2014–2016 oil price collapse severely impacted Seadrill, and the company filed for Chapter 11 bankruptcy protection in 2017. Fredriksen led efforts to restructure the company, which emerged from bankruptcy in July 2018 with over US$1 billion in new capital. Fredriksen retained approximately 30% ownership after supporting the process. In November 2019, Fredriksen stepped down as chairman of Seadrill but maintained his significant shareholding and involvement.

=== Mowi and aquaculture (2005–present) ===
Fredriksen's first major move into the aquaculture industry came in the second quarter of 2005, when Domstein's 24% stake in Fjord Seafood was sold to his investment vehicle Geveran Trading. Around the same time, Pan Fish announced that two companies indirectly controlled by Fredriksen had acquired a combined 48% of the company's outstanding shares.

In March 2006, Geveran Trading purchased Marine Harvest from its joint owners for €881 million, before immediately transferring ownership to Pan Fish. By the end of 2006, the Marine Harvest group was brought under the control of Pan Fish, creating the world's largest salmon farming company. The merged entity was renamed Marine Harvest and later, in 2019, rebranded as Mowi.

Mowi controls approximately 25–30% of the global salmon and trout market, making it the world's largest company in the sector. As of 2025, Fredriksen holds approximately 15% of Mowi through Geveran Trading, making it one of his most valuable holdings. His daughter Cecilie serves on Mowi's board of directors.

=== Golden Ocean and other interests ===
Golden Ocean Group Limited was spun off from Frontline in December 2004 and subsequently listed on the Oslo Stock Exchange. The company became one of the world's leading dry bulk shipping companies, operating a fleet of primarily Capesize and Panamax vessels for transporting commodities such as iron ore, coal, and grain.

In March 2025, Fredriksen sold his approximately 40.8% stake in Golden Ocean to CMB.TECH (the Saverys family-controlled company, formerly Euronav) for approximately US$1.18 billion, marking his exit from the dry bulk shipping sector.

Through his various holding companies, Fredriksen has also maintained interests in Flex LNG (liquefied natural gas carriers), Avance Gas Holding (LPG carriers), and SFL Corporation (ship leasing).

=== Arcadia Petroleum and oil trading ===
Fredriksen acquired Arcadia Petroleum, a global oil trading firm, from Japan's Mitsui & Co Ltd in 2006 through his Farahead Holdings. The company became a significant player in crude oil trading, particularly in West African markets.

In 2011, the U.S. Commodity Futures Trading Commission (CFTC) filed a civil suit against Arcadia, its US affiliate Parnon Energy, and two traders, alleging market manipulation in 2008 that resulted in approximately US$50 million in gains. Fredriksen dismissed the allegations as "rubbish". The case was settled in 2014 for US$13 million, with no admission of wrongdoing, and the company agreed to limits on physical crude trading at Cushing, Oklahoma.

In February 2015, Arcadia sued its former CEO Peter Bosworth and CFO Colin Hurley for alleged fraud amounting to US$287 million. After a decade-long legal battle, a UK Commercial Court judge dismissed all claims in January 2025, ruling that Bosworth and Hurley had acted honestly and in what they reasonably believed to be the company's best interests. The company was renamed Alta Trading and wound down operations in 2022.

== Citizenship and residency ==
In 2006, Fredriksen renounced his Norwegian citizenship and acquired Cypriot citizenship. The move was widely attributed to tax considerations, as Cyprus's non-domiciled tax status exempts foreign-sourced income from local taxation and imposes no inheritance tax. Norway's inheritance taxes could have reached up to 30% on estates exceeding NOK 470,000 per heir, and personal income tax rates topped 55% at the time.

Norwegian officials and media commentators criticised the move as unpatriotic tax avoidance. Then-Prime Minister Jens Stoltenberg (who later served as Secretary General of NATO from 2014 to 2024 and returned to Norwegian politics as Minister of Finance in 2025) responded at the time by saying that Fredriksen's new citizenship "recognises his real situation," noting that "he hasn't lived in Norway for several decades. He hasn't paid tax to Norway in several decades either." Fredriksen left Norway in 1978 and has maintained that the move was a necessary response to fiscal pressures that threatened capital erosion.

For many years, Fredriksen resided primarily in London, where he owned The Old Rectory, a Georgian Grade II listed mansion at 56 Old Church Street in Chelsea, dating to approximately 1725. He purchased the property in 2001 from Greek shipping magnate Theodore Angelopoulos for £37 million. The property has 30,000 square feet of living space, ten bedroom suites, a ballroom, and two acres of private gardens—the largest private garden in London behind Buckingham Palace, Winfield House, and Witanhurst. In 2004, former Chelsea F.C. owner Roman Abramovich reportedly offered £100 million for the property, but Fredriksen declined.

In July 2025, Fredriksen listed The Old Rectory for sale at £250 million (approximately US$337 million), following the UK Labour government's abolition of the non-domiciled tax regime. He announced he was relocating his business operations to the United Arab Emirates, stating that "Britain has gone to hell, like Norway" and that "the entire Western world is on its way down."

== Gard case ==
In June 1986, police raided both Marine Management and SeaTeam to investigate suspected oil theft and insurance fraud. The suspicions were confirmed and top management was arrested. After a period in hiding, Fredriksen surrendered to police and spent more than four months in custody.

After numerous postponements and four years of legal manoeuvring, the case concluded in late summer 1990 with Fredriksen accepting a fine of NOK 2 million for endangering his crews' lives by using crude oil as fuel. The charges of aggravated theft, insurance fraud, and improper accounting were dropped. Charges against the other defendants were simultaneously dismissed.

The case was a major burden for Fredriksen, an "outsider" in the Norwegian shipping establishment. Banks abandoned him, and most of the fleet had to be sold at a time when the freight market was on the verge of a spectacular upturn. Marine Management was dissolved, but Fredriksen quickly rebuilt his business, partly through buying and selling ships and drilling rigs.

== Personal life ==
Fredriksen married Inger Katharina Astrup (1950–2006), a dentist (cand.odont.), in 1977. She belonged to one of the prominent Astrup families in Norway; her father was psychiatrist Christian Astrup (1921–1989), and her great-uncle was the renowned Norwegian painter Nikolai Astrup. Inger died of cancer in December 2006.

The couple had twin daughters, Kathrine and Cecilie Astrup Fredriksen, born in 1983. Both daughters have taken on increasingly prominent roles in their father's business operations. Kathrine has served as a director at Golar LNG, while Cecilie holds a board seat at Frontline and Mowi. Despite speculation about succession, Fredriksen has stated that his daughters "should not have to live with the work every day I have had."

Fredriksen is considered media-shy but maintains strong ties to Norway. He was known for his long-held reserved table at Theatercaféen and his famous pre-Christmas parties there. The headquarters for his Norwegian business operations is at Aker Brygge. He maintains properties in London, Oslo, Cyprus, and Marbella, Spain, and is a collector of classic Norwegian art.

Fredriksen became an investor in Vålerenga Fotball in 1996, the football club from the Oslo district where he grew up. In 2003, he cleared the club's debt, contributing to its subsequent Eliteserien league title in 2005.

In 2021, Fredriksen became the largest shareholder in Norwegian Air Shuttle, investing significant funds during the airline's restructuring following the COVID-19 pandemic. By 2023, he held approximately 14% of the airline.

== Philanthropy ==
Fredriksen has engaged in private philanthropy primarily directed toward medical research in Norway. He has donated several hundreds of millions of Norwegian krone to medical research at hospitals in Norway, including The Radium Hospital (Radiumhospitalet), Norway's specialist hospital for cancer treatment and research.

The Inger and John Fredriksen Foundation for Ovarian cancer Research was established in memory of his late wife to fund advancements in ovarian cancer treatments.

== Wealth ==
Fredriksen's net worth has fluctuated significantly over the years, closely tracking cycles in the global shipping industry. The Sunday Times Rich List has ranked Fredriksen's wealth as £475 million (2003), £1.050 billion (2004), £1.887 billion (2005), and £8.311 billion (2023). In 2012, Fredriksen and his family were listed as the 9th richest in Britain with a combined wealth of £6.6 billion.

Forbes has tracked Fredriksen prominently in its billionaire lists since the 2000s, capturing peaks aligned with tanker market upswings. In 2013, his fortune reached US$11.5 billion, securing the 87th global rank amid recovering post-financial crisis shipping rates. By 2022, Forbes valued him at US$11.9 billion (158th rank), reflecting a period of stabilisation. Forbes' 2025 figure stood at US$17 billion (119th global rank).

In Norway's domestic assessments, Fredriksen has consistently topped the Kapital rich list. The 2025 Kapital valuation surged to NOK 262 billion (approximately US$27 billion), up NOK 9 billion from prior years, driven by tanker fleet appreciations amid geopolitical disruptions boosting oil transport demand. The higher Norwegian estimate attributes greater weight to private and controlled assets than Forbes' methodology.

Fredriksen's wealth is held primarily through stakes in more than a dozen publicly traded companies operating in the shipping, oil services, logistics, and food manufacturing industries. His holdings are managed through Cyprus-based holding companies Hemen Holding and Geveran Trading Co., as well as Liberia-based World Shipholding and Farahead Investment.

== Business philosophy ==
Fredriksen's approach to shipping market cycles centres on contrarian investments, leveraging cash reserves accumulated during market upswings to acquire assets at depressed valuations during downturns. His late-2019 investment in Frontline, made when the tanker market was at a cyclical low, generated an approximately 3.5-fold return plus dividends over five years by the time the stock peaked in 2024, demonstrating his ability to time entries against prevailing pessimism.

Thanks to his practice of awarding large dividends from his companies when profits were soaring, Fredriksen built the confidence of investors who might otherwise steer clear of the battered tanker industry. As he told The Washington Post in 2012: "Basically, I'm a trader. I think as we are sitting here, we are very close to the bottom of the market, and I like to be a buyer at the bottom."

His investment decisions are often driven by instinct rather than economic forecasts. "I still work on a gut feeling," he has said, basing his purchases on plunging asset prices rather than on economic and petroleum growth forecasts, which he considers too uncertain to be useful.

In a June 2025 interview with Finansavisen, Fredriksen emphasised the importance of liquidity, noting that his companies "have good experience of sitting on money during times of upheaval globally" and that "cash is king." He outlined his current strategy: "We are opportunistic and look for good investments—not necessarily control... It can be valuable to have gas in the tank when others run out. Shipping has always been cyclical. The question is who's prepared when the cycle turns."

== See also ==
- List of Cypriots by net worth
- List of shipping companies
