= Sapura Group =

Malaysian company

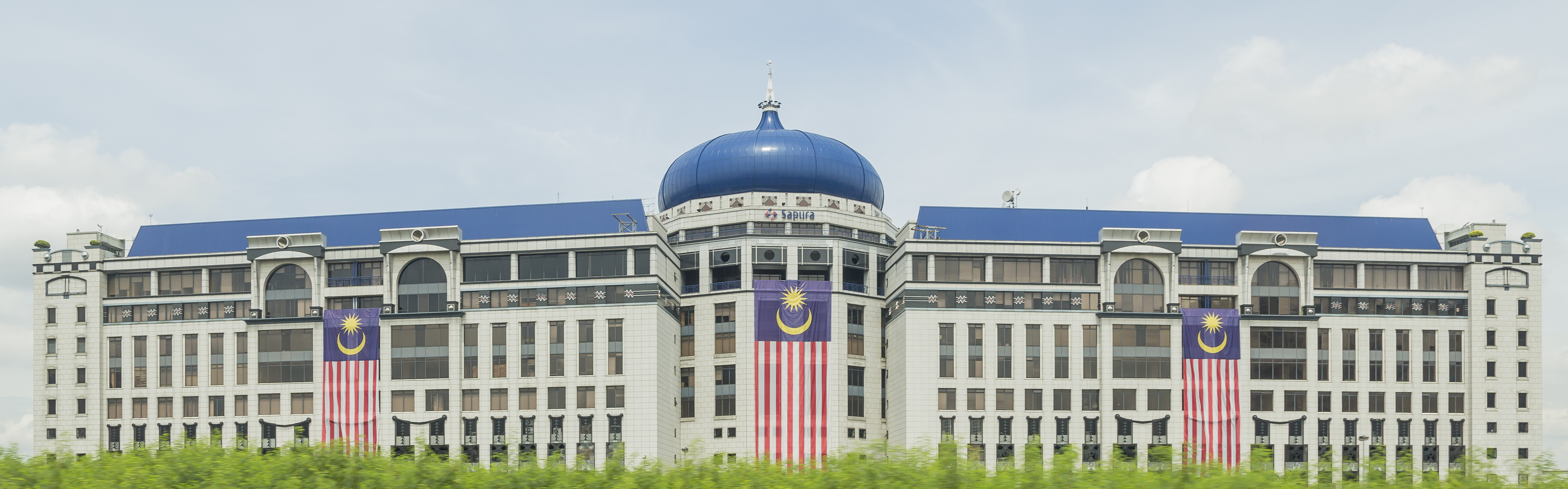
- Sapura Group headquarters
- Company type: Public limited company
- Industry: Oil and gas; manufacturing engineering; property; aviation; defence; rail construction
- Founded: 1975; 51 years ago
- Founder: Abdul Kadir Shamsuddin
- Headquarters: Kuala Lumpur, Malaysia
- Key people: Tan Sri Dato' Seri Shahril Shamsuddin
- Number of employees: 6,000+ (not including division employees)
- Website: sapura.com.my

Sapura Group, also known as Sapura, is a Malaysian public limited company based in Kuala Lumpur, mainly engaged in oil and gas, manufacturing engineering, property, aviation, defence, and rail construction. Formed in 1975 by Abdul Kadir Shamsuddin, the company was named after his wife, Siti Sapura.

== History ==
Sapura began with six staff members, in a one-room office. They were mainly involved in the telecommunications industry, with the purchase of Uniphone Works from United Motor Works (now UMW Holdings), in 1975. In the 1980s, the company acquired Malayan Cables Berhad.

By 1991, Sapura consisted of thirty subsidiaries and two publicly listed companies. With its rapid expansion, Sapura became involved in the automotive industry, by establishing Sapura Motor Berhad, in 1994, which was eventually listed on the main board of the nation's primary stock exchange, Bursa Malaysia, and renamed Sapura Industrial Berhad.

The company's expansion continued with the establishment of new divisions, such as Sapura Energy Berhad, Sapura Resources Berhad, Sapura Aero Sdn Bhd, and Sapura Secured Technologies, which variously specialized in oil and gas, manufacturing, engineering, property, aviation, defence, and rail construction.

== Divisions and core businesses ==
=== Sapura Energy ===
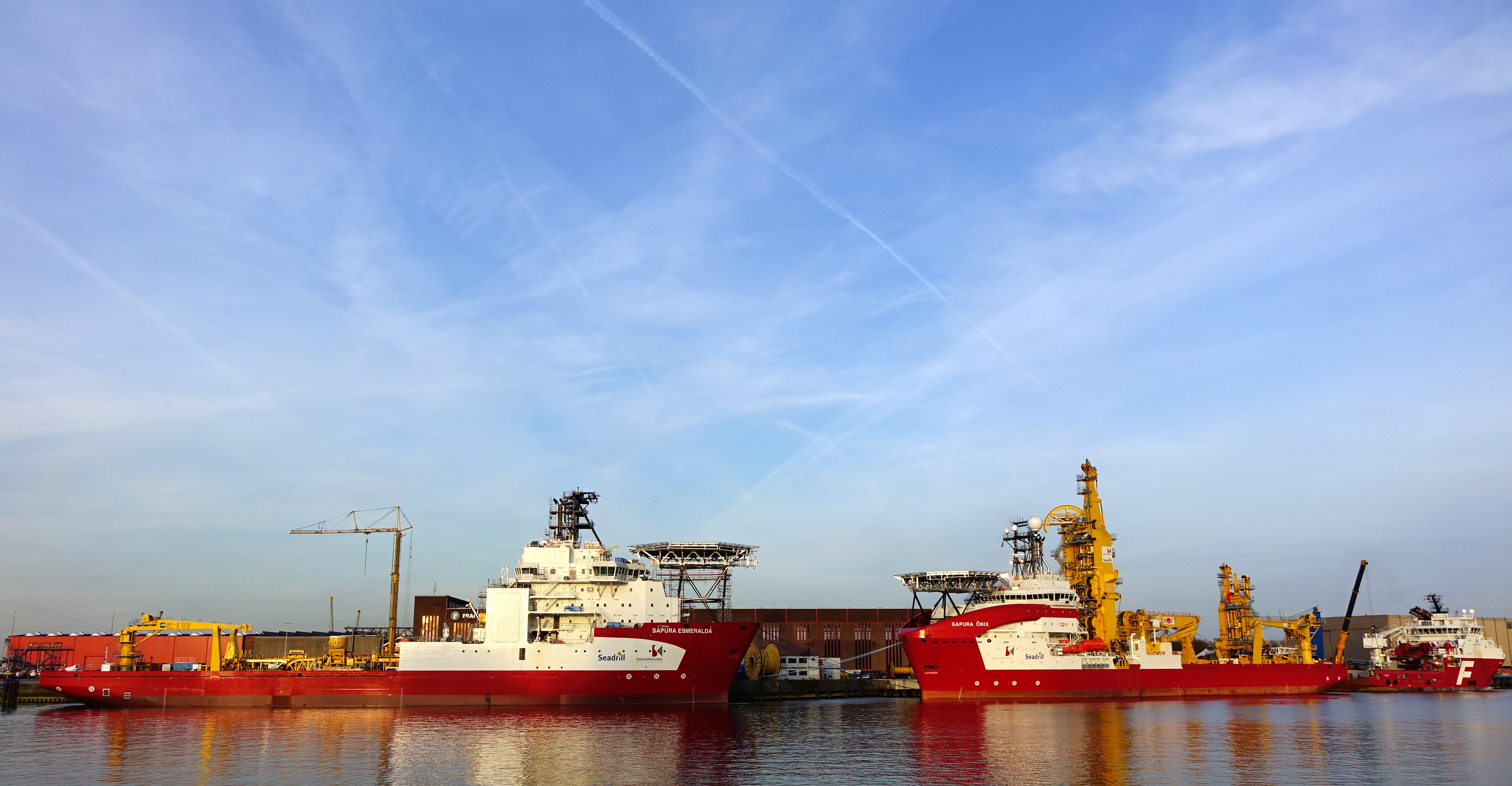
Sapura Energy oil exploration ships

Sapura Energy Berhad's core business includes:

- Engineering and construction of offshore platforms and marine pipelines for oil exploration
- Operation and maintenance of offshore platforms and pipelines
- Drilling and completion of wells
- Exploration and production of oil and gas

=== Sapura Industrial ===
Established as Sapura Motor Berhad in 1994 and specializing in automotive manufacturing, the company was renamed Sapura Industrial Berhad in 2004 after becoming listed on the main board of Bursa Malaysia. Its core business includes the manufacture of machine engines, transmissions, brake component, stabilizer bars, suspension systems, and automotive module assemblies.

=== Sapura Resources ===
This division of Sapura focuses on the development and rental of buildings and land, such as offices, warehouses, commercial space, and aircraft hangars.

=== Sapura Aero ===
As a division involved in the aviation sector, Sapura Aero provides private aviation services that include mission planning, aircraft management, and charter service. It is based at Sultan Abdul Aziz Shah Airport, Subang, and Senai International Airport, Johor Bahru.

=== Sapura Secured Technologies ===
This division specializes in defence electronics and systems integration. It provides communication systems, tactical systems, command and control systems, training and simulation systems, and surveillance systems. The company also has involvement with the Malaysian Armed Forces Network Centric Operation program, in the provision of satellite and ground communication systems and integrated mission systems.
