= Torolf Smedvig =

Norwegian businessman

Torolf Smedvig (1917–1977) was a Norwegian businessman and the head of Smedvig ASA.

== Early life ==
He was the eldest son of Peder Smedvig, the founder of Smedvig ASA.

== Career ==
After his father Peder Smedvig died in 1959, his son Torolf Smedvig took over the running of the company and the canned food business became a separate company run by another branch of the family.

== Personal life ==
In 1942, he married Nora Kluge (1921–1999), the daughter of supreme court judge Kristofer Nordahl Kluge (1892–1972).

His son Peter Smedvig took over the running of the company. His granddaughter is Anna Margaret Smedvig.
