= Frontline Ltd. =

Shipping company

Frontline PLC
- Type: Publicly traded limited company
- Traded as: OSE: FRO; NYSE: FRO; Russell 2000 Company
- ISIN: CY0200352116
- Industry: Oil tanker shipping
- Founded: 1985
- Headquarters: Limassol, Cyprus
- Key people: John Fredriksen (Chairman and President)
- Revenue: US$956.38 million (2019)
- Net income: US$139.97 million (2019)
- Total assets: US$3.798 billion (end 2010)
- Total equity: US$759.0 million (end 2010)
- Owner: John Fredriksen (40.2%)
- Number of employees: 70 (end 2010)
- Website: frontline.bm

Frontline PLC is the world's fifth largest oil tanker shipping company, based in Limassol, Cyprus and controlled by John Fredriksen. Its primary business is transporting crude oil. As of 2008 the company had one of the world's largest tanker fleets consisting of VLCC, Suezmax and Suezmax OBO carriers (82 tankers in total with 18 more on order).

== History ==
Frontline has its origin in Frontline AB, which was founded in 1985, and which was listed on the Stockholm Stock Exchange from 1989 to 1997. Hemen Holding (a company indirectly controlled by the largest shareholder and chairman of Frontline, John Fredriksen) became the largest shareholder of Frontline in 1996. In May 1997, a decision was made at the general meeting in Frontline AB to change its domicile from Sweden to Bermuda and to list its shares on the Oslo Stock Exchange. The change of domicile was executed through a share for share exchange offer from the then newly formed Frontline in Bermuda.

Under Fredriksen the company absorbed several other companies: London and Overseas Freighters (1997), ICB (1999), and Golden Ocean (2000). These takeovers made Frontline the world's largest tanker company, a position it has retained to the present day.

== Today ==
As of 31 December 2010, Frontline's tanker and OBO fleet consisted of 73 vessels. The fleet consists of 44 VLCCs, which are either owned or chartered in, 21 Suezmax tankers which are either owned or chartered in and eight Suezmax OBOs which are chartered in. Frontline also had five VLCC newbuildings and two Suezmax newbuildings on order and three VLCCs under their commercial management. The company's largest shareholder is Hemen Holding Ltd., a company indirectly controlled by the chairman of Frontline, billionaire John Fredriksen, Norway's highest net worth person.

The freight market is very volatile, with standard deviations of up to 70%. From an options perspective, this is a possibility for a very large up and downside—part of this downside can be hedged away via freight derivatives. AG-Japan clean and dirty are the most liquid routes traded in the derivatives market. Frontline has a very high dividend yield, both in cash and in Ship Finance (SFL) stocks; for example, in late 2007 its annual dividend ran between 12 and 18%, depending on the fluctuating share price. SFL is an offshoot of Frontline; the offshoot is estimated to have generated 25% gains to shareholders due to the different risk in Frontline and SFL. Golden Ocean Group (GOGL), a dry bulk carrier firm, was also spun off of Frontline and listed on the Oslo Stock Exchange. GOGL is a volatile stock, and as with Frontline, dry freight derivatives are available. In 2006, Frontline started a new Floating Production Storage and Offloading (FPSO) project, Sea Production.

In June 2007, Frontline sold its entire holding of 25,500,000 shares in Sea Production. The sale of the shares was in line with Frontline's strategy to remain a pure crude oil transportation company. Frontline and Sea Production will continue a strategic partnership with respect to conversion of crude oil tankers into oil storage and production units.

On 7 April 2022 there was announced a merger between Euronav and Frontline Ltd. pending regulatory approval and ironing out of the last details. The merger would have created the world's largest publicly listed tanker company. Euronav's largest shareholder, Compagnie Maritime Belge, opposed the merger and on 9 January 2023, Frontline announced that the merger would not take place. On 9 October 2023, Frontline sold its 26% stake in Euronav to Compagnie Maritime Belge. As part of the sale, Frontline acquired 24 of Euronav's oil tankers for an aggregate purchase price of $2.35 billion USD.
