= Clay C. Williams =

American oil industry businessman

Clay C. Williams (born 1962) is a businessman in the oil industry. He is currently the Chairman and Chief Executive Officer at National Oilwell Varco.

== Education ==
Clay Williams has a B.S. degree in Civil/Geological Engineering from Princeton University and an MBA from the University of Texas at Austin.

== National Oilwell Varco ==
Before Williams took on his current position of chairman and CEO on June 2, 2014, he held a variety of other roles at the firm. This includes: Chief Financial Officer (from 2005 to 2012), Chief Operating Officer (2012 to 2014) and Executive Vice President (2009 to 2012). His total compensation for 2013 was $6,371,102.

From 1997 to 2000 and 2001 to 2002, Williams was VP of Corporate Development at Varco International. From 1999 to 2001, he was VP of Pipeline Services for both Varco and Tuboscope before the merger and then from 1996 to 1997, Director of Corporate Development. Between 2003 and 2005, he was the CFO and VP, prior to the company's merger. Thereafter, he held the same positions at the newly merged company.

== Employment history ==
In 2008, Clay Williams became an Independent Director at Benchmark Electronics Inc. In 1994, he worked at SCF Partners for two years and prior to that he held the position of Petroleum Engineer at Shell Oil Company.

== Philanthropy ==
Clay Williams is the Director and Treasurer of the Center for Hearing & Speech, Director and Chairman of the South Division of the Sam Houston Area Council of the Boy Scouts of America. He is also a member of the Society of Petroleum Engineers. In addition, Williams was once a trustee and business management committee chair of Faith United Methodist Church in Richmond, Texas.

== Personal life ==
Born and raised in Katy, Texas, today Williams has three children. He lives in Houston, Texas.
