= Aroundtown =

Luxembourg-based real estate company

Aroundtown SA
- Company type: Société Anonyme
- Traded as: FWB: AT1; MDAX component
- ISIN: LU1673108939
- Industry: Real Estate
- Founded: 2004; 22 years ago
- Headquarters: Luxembourg, Luxembourg
- Area served: Germany, Netherlands, London
- Key people: Barak Bar-Hen (CEO); Oschrie Massachi (Capital Markets); Eyal Ben David (CFO); Klaus Krägel (Chief Development Officer)
- Products: Office, hotel, residential
- Total assets: €32 billion (September 2012)
- Number of employees: ~500 (2020)
- Website: www.aroundtown.de

Aroundtown SA (former Aroundtown Property Holdings Plc) is a publicly listed real estate company, registered in Luxembourg. It invests in commercial and residential properties in central locations in European cities primarily in Germany and the Netherlands.

== History ==
Aroundtown was founded in 2004 by Israeli-born businessman Yakir Gabay. The first acquisitions started in the center of Berlin, in neighbourhoods such as Mitte and Charlottenburg.

The company went public on the Euronext Stock Exchange in mid 2015. By 2019, it was the largest publicly traded real estate company in Germany.

== Overview ==
Aroundtown invests in commercial and residential real estate.

The majority of the portfolio is located in the cities of Berlin (25%), Frankfurt, Munich, Cologne, Hamburg, Amsterdam, London and other major European metropolitans. Approximately half of the portfolio is offices, the remaining is primarily hotels and residential.
