= Loucas Haji-Ioannou =

Cypriot shipping magnate (1927–2008)

- Born: 15 September 1927; Pedoulas, Cyprus
- Died: 17 December 2008 (aged 81); Athens, Greece
- Occupation: Shipping entrepreneur
- Known for: Founder of Troodos Shipping; “Tanker King” of the 1980s
- Spouse: Nedi Misirli
- Children: Stelios Haji-Ioannou; Polys Haji-Ioannou; Clelia Haji-Ioannou

Loucas Haji-Ioannou (15 September 1927 – 17 December 2008) was a Greek-Cypriot shipping magnate, best known for building one of the world’s largest privately owned tanker fleets. Widely referred to as the "Tanker King," he controlled more than 50 vessels by the 1980s and played a dominant role in oil transportation routes during the Iran–Iraq War.

== Early life and career ==
Born in the mountain village of Pedoulas in Cyprus, Loucas was the eldest of twelve children and left school at age 17 to support his family. He began as a salesman, then worked as an accountant for his uncle in Jeddah, Saudi Arabia. After his uncle’s death, he launched his own import–export enterprise during the 1950s Saudi construction boom and became the sole importer of Heracles and Titan cement.

In 1959, he moved to London and acquired his first vessel—a 10,500-ton dry cargo ship named *Nedi* after his wife. By 1965, he had amassed a fleet of over 20 cargo vessels. Recognizing the potential of oil transportation, he purchased his first oil tanker in 1969, positioning his firm, Troodos Shipping, for rapid growth.

== Rise to prominence ==
During the Iran–Iraq War of the 1980s, Haji-Ioannou’s willingness to send tankers into hazardous zones, coupled with advanced safety retrofits, enabled him to secure exceptionally high charter rates. This strategic boldness allowed him to recoup tanker costs rapidly and cemented his reputation as the “Tanker King.”

By the late 1980s, Loucas controlled a fleet exceeding 50 tankers, responsible for a total deadweight of millions of tonnes.

== Personal life and legacy ==
Loucas Haji-Ioannou married Nedi in 1958; the couple had three children: Polys, Stelios, and Clelia. Each child became prominent in their own right; Polys in shipping, Stelios founding easyJet, and Clelia in investments and philanthropy.

Upon his death in Athens in December 2008 after a prolonged illness, he was remembered as a transformative figure in maritime trade and as a central patriarch of a shipping dynasty.
