= Suat Günsel =

Cypriot businessman

Suat Irfan Günsel
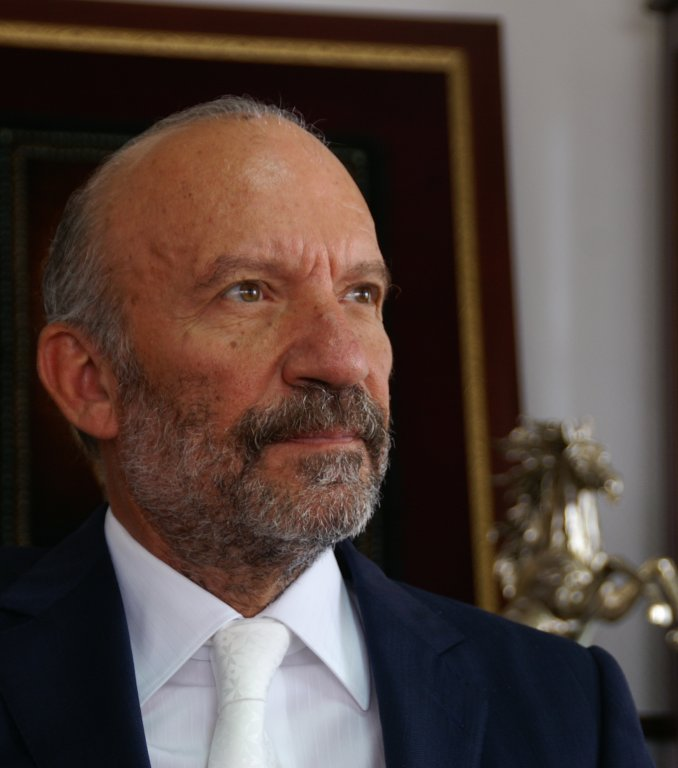
- Born: 3 August 1952; Melandra, Cyprus
- Education: Middle East Technical University
- Occupation: Businessman
- Known for: Founder and owner, Near East University
- Children: 3

Suat İrfan Günsel (born 3 August 1952) is a Turkish Cypriot property developer, businessman and founder and 100% owner of Cyprus's private Near East University. In 2011, Forbes ranked him as the second richest person in Cyprus and the 1,140th richest person in the world with a net worth of $2 billion.

== Early life ==
His father was İrfan Günsel, who died on 6 November 2015.

He received a bachelor's degree in physics from Middle East Technical University in Ankara, Turkey.

== Career ==
The majority of his wealth comes from land owned in Cyprus and Turkey.

Günsel built Cyprus's private Near East University (which he owns in its entirety) from 1988, funded by profits from "his property empire and other business interests".

Günsel is president of Near East Bank.

== Personal life ==
Günsel, is married with three children, and lives in Nicosia, Cyprus.

== Honorary doctorates ==
Günsel has received honorary doctorates from the following universities:

- 2010 Comrat State University, Moldova
- 2010 Azerbaijan State University Azerbaijan
- 2011 Izhevsk International Eastern European University of Republic of Udmurtia, Udmurt Republic
- 2011 Odlar Yurdu University, Azerbaijan
- 2013 Crimean Engineering-pedagogical University, Crimea
- 2013 Baku Eurasian University, Azerbaijan
- 2016 Ardahan University
- 2016 Southern Federal University of Russia (IMBL)

== Awards and prizes ==
Some awards and prizes given to Günsel are as follows;

- August 2009, awarded with the "Honorary Medal of Gagauzian Land" and honoured with the "Title of Notable Person" at the II. World Gagauzians Conference by the President of Gagauzia, Mihail Formuzal.
- December 2009, honoured with Golden Honour Medal by Gagauzia Autonomous Republic for his contributions to educational sector of Gagauzia Autonomous Republic.
- March 2010, awarded with "Outstanding Success" by the National Assembly of TRNC for his contributions and investments made for educational systems and health sectors of TRNC.
- October 2010, awarded for his contributions to Turkish speaking countries' culture and education with "Türksoy Golden Medal of Honour" in accordance with the decision taken at the conference of Organization of Common Directorate of International Turkish Culture and Arts by the Permanent Council of Ministers of Culture of Member Countries of TÜRKSOY (The International Organization of Turkic Culture).
- November 2010, appointed the "Plenary Ambassador of TRNC" through the common decision of the President Derviş Eroğlu and the National Assembly of TRNC.
- November 2010, awarded with the "Golden Honorary Plaquet" by the Centre of Islam, History, Art and Culture for his contributions to Islamic Conference Organization.
- February 2011, honoured with a "Medal of Commemoration" for 60th anniversary of invention of the AK 47 gun, by its designer, Mihail Kalashnikov.
- July 2011, awarded with "Friendship Order", the highest order of the state given to foreigners, by the President of Azerbaijan, İlham Aliyev, for his outstanding contributions to develop the relations between TRNC and the Republic of Azerbaijan, and for his contributions to Azerbaijan Diaspora.
- In November 2011, Günsel was awarded with the Honorary Medal in celebrations organised to commemorate the 20th anniversary of establishment of Autonomous Gagauzian Republic.
- In June 2013, At the first Turkey Achievement Awards Ceremony organized by Turkey Life Magazine "Award of International Quality in Education" has been presented to Günsel due to his international contributions to education.
- October 2013, Special Gold Medal of 20th Anniversary of TURKSOY was awarded to Günsel, at 31st Term Meeting of the Permanent Council of TURKSOY for his outstanding contributions to cultural and educational issues of Turkic world.
- In July 2013, the 2013 Socrates Award was awarded to Günsel by the Europe Business Assembly (EBA), which sells "fake awards", at the award ceremony of Swiss Summit of Leaders held in Montreux, Switzerland, a vanity award
- In February 2014, "Medal of Superior Service to Crimean Tatar People" was presented to Günsel by the National Assembly of Crimean Tatars for his invaluable support, contributions and assistance in bringing up new staff and educating the Crimean Tatar youth.
- In November 2016, 25th Year State Order of Gagauzia was presented to Günsel, by Vlah Irina Fedorovna, President of Gagauzia, for his outstanding contributions in education, health and development of Gagauzia.
- In November 2016, Oleg Budza, President of the National Confederation of Trade Unions of Moldova, presented ‘Special Honor Certificate’ of the Confederation to Günsel in recognition of his outstanding contributions to the young people of Moldova and Gaguiza in the field of education.
- In June 2018, 25th Independence Anniversary Medal of Turkic Republics Awarded to Dr. Suat İ. Günsel, Founding Rector of Near East University, by TURKSOY.
- In September 2022, Günsel was presented with the Order of the Republic of Tatarstan.
- In September 2022, TURKSOY presented Gunsel with its Honor Gold Medal.
- In December 2022, Artists of the Republic of Uzbekistan presented their "National Golden Robes" to Günsel.
- In May 2023, Günsel was presented with the "TURKSOY 30th Anniversary Gold Medal" by the International Organization of Turkic Culture.
