= Seadrill =

Offshore drilling company

Seadrill Limited
- Type: Public limited company
- Traded as: OSE: SDRL; NYSE: SDRL
- Industry: Petroleum industry
- Founded: May 10, 2005; 21 years ago
- Headquarters: Hamilton, Bermuda (Incorporated), Houston, United States (operational) London, United Kingdom (Global)
- Key people: Julie Johnson Robertson, Chairperson; Simon Johnson, CEO; Grant Creed, CFO
- Services: Offshore drilling
- Revenue: ▼$1.253 billion (2018)
- Net income: ▲ -$4.490 billion (2018)
- Total assets: ▼$10.848 billion (2018)
- Total equity: ▼$3.035 billion (2018)
- Number of employees: 4,780 (2016)
- Website: www.seadrill.com

Seadrill is an offshore drilling contractor providing worldwide offshore drilling services to the oil and gas industry. Its primary business is the ownership and operation of drillships, semi-submersible rigs, and jack-up rigs for operations in shallow to ultra-deep water in both benign and harsh environments. It provides a contract-based service and primarily serves the oil super-majors, integrated oil and gas, state-owned national oil, and independent oil and gas companies.

== History ==
Seadrill was incorporated as a Bermuda company on May 10, 2005 by John Fredriksen.

In July 2005, the company acquired jack up rigs from Odfjell Drilling.

In September 2006, the company acquired a controlling share of Smedvig by outbidding Noble Corporation.

In 2007, the company acquired Eastern Drilling.

In May 2010, the company outbid Ensco (now Valaris Limited) for Scorpion Offshore, valuing the company at $567 million.

In 2014, Seadrill conducted an initial public offering of its North Atlantic Drilling subsidiary, which owns harsh environment rigs. Seadrill continued to own 70% of North Atlantic Drilling.

In April 2013, the company sold the majority of its tender rig and semi-tender operation to SapuraKencana.

In May 2013, the company sold Tender rigs T-15, T16 and the West Vencedor to Seadrill Partners LLC.

In June 2013, the company acquired a majority interest in Sevan Drilling.

In November 2014, the company suspended dividend payments as a result of a downturn in the industry.

In December 2017, the company filed bankruptcy. The company emerged from bankruptcy in July 2018.

In 2019, Seadrill acquired a 50% stake in Gulfdrill, a joint venture that operates five premium jackups in Qatar with Qatargas. The remaining 50% interest is owned by Gulf Drilling International (GDI).

In 2019, Seadrill acquired a 50% stake in Sonadrill, a joint venture that operates 3 drillships focusing on opportunities in Angolan waters. The remaining 50% interest is owned by Sonangol EP.

The company delisted its shares from the New York Stock Exchange in June 2020.

On October 1, 2020, Seadrill announced the appointment of new CEO Stuart Jackson, replacing Anton Dibowitz with immediate effect.

In November 2020, Seadrill has collaborated with Forbearance.

On February 10, 2021, Seadrill filed for Chapter 11 bankruptcy for the second time. The company emerged from Chapter 11 in February 2022 and a new Board of Directors was appointed.

On January 12, 2022, Seadrill New Finance, Seadrill's subsidiary, filed for Chapter 11 bankruptcy. The company emerged from bankruptcy on January 20, 2022.

On March 24, 2022, Seadrill announced the appointment of new CEO Simon Johnson, replacing Stuart Jackson.

On October 11, 2022, Seadrill Limited received approval to relist its Shares on the NYSE under the ticker symbol “SDRL”. The Shares commenced trading on October 14, 2022. Following the listing on the NYSE, the status of Seadrill Limited’s listing on the Euronext Expand market of the OSE was changed from a primary to a secondary listing. On November 17, 2022, the Shares were moved from the Euronext Expand market to the main list of the OSE

In October 2022, Seadrill completed the sale of seven jack-up rigs to ADES Arabia Holding Company.

In December 2022, it was announced Seadrill had acquired the London-headquartered owner of offshore drilling units, Aquadrill LLC, in an all-stock deal worth $958 million USD. The transaction closed in April 2023.

In June 2023, Seadrill announced the sale of its three tender assist-units.

== Sustainability ==
Seadrill has reported its GHG emissions via The Carbon Disclosure Project (CDP) since 2010 with a year-on-year reduction in its carbon footprint. The company published its first sustainability report in 2021. In 2021, Seadrill achieved an industry-leading B rating from CDP, 0 fines or significant environmental incidents, and 0 tier 1 well control events.

== Controversies ==
=== Bribery allegations ===
In 2015, Petrobras alleged bribery in the negotiations of rig contracts signed by Sevan Drilling, a subsidiary of Seadrill, in 2005-2008. In 2018, Økokrim, the Norwegian authority for investigation and prosecution of economic and environmental crime, completed the investigation against Sevan Drilling and the original charges were dismissed.

=== Environmental damage due to rig fire ===
In November 2009, Seadrill's West Atlas jackup rig, which was located on Montara field, about 690 kilometers offshore of Darwin, Australia, caught fire after the field had been leaking oil for ten weeks. The rig was operated by the Thai firm PTTEP. For 74 days, gas and oil ran into the Timor Sea, in what was one of the worst environmental disasters in Australian history.

The Thai national petroleum exploration company (PTTEP) took immediate responsibility for the oil spill and, in 2011, the company pleaded guilty to four charges in the Darwin Magistrates Court relating to the workplace health and safety and failure to maintain good oilfield practice. The company conducted scientific studies and concluded there “has been little or no detectable impact from the spill on any marine ecosystem or species in the Timor Sea”.
