= Near East University =

Private university in Northern Cyprus

Coordinates: 35°13′35″N 33°19′29″E

- Yakın Doğu Üniversitesi
- Type: Private
- Established: 1988
- Chairman: Irfan S. Günsel
- Rector: Ümit Hassan
- Faculty: 1,200
- Administrative staff: 1,050
- Students: 25,068
- Location: Nicosia, Republic of Cyprus
- Campus: 98 ha (main campus), 24 ha (suburban)
- Colors: Bordeaux and white
- Website: www.neu.edu.tr

Near East University (NEU; Turkish: Yakın Doğu Üniversitesi, commonly referred to as YDÜ) is a private university located in Northern Cyprus. It was founded in North Nicosia in 1988, by Suat Günsel, a Turkish Cypriot who is the 100% owner of NEU. The chairman of the board of trustees is his son, Irfan Günsel.

The Near East University currently has 16 faculties with 98 departments, 4 vocational schools, 2 high schools and 4 graduate schools offering programs at undergraduate and postgraduate levels.

With over 15,000 students, it is the largest university in Northern Cyprus.

== History ==
The Near East University was founded by Günsel in 1988. It started higher education studies with two faculties and subsequently established 14 more faculties, four graduate schools, and 15 research centres. The Faculty of Medicine was established in 2008.

== Campus ==
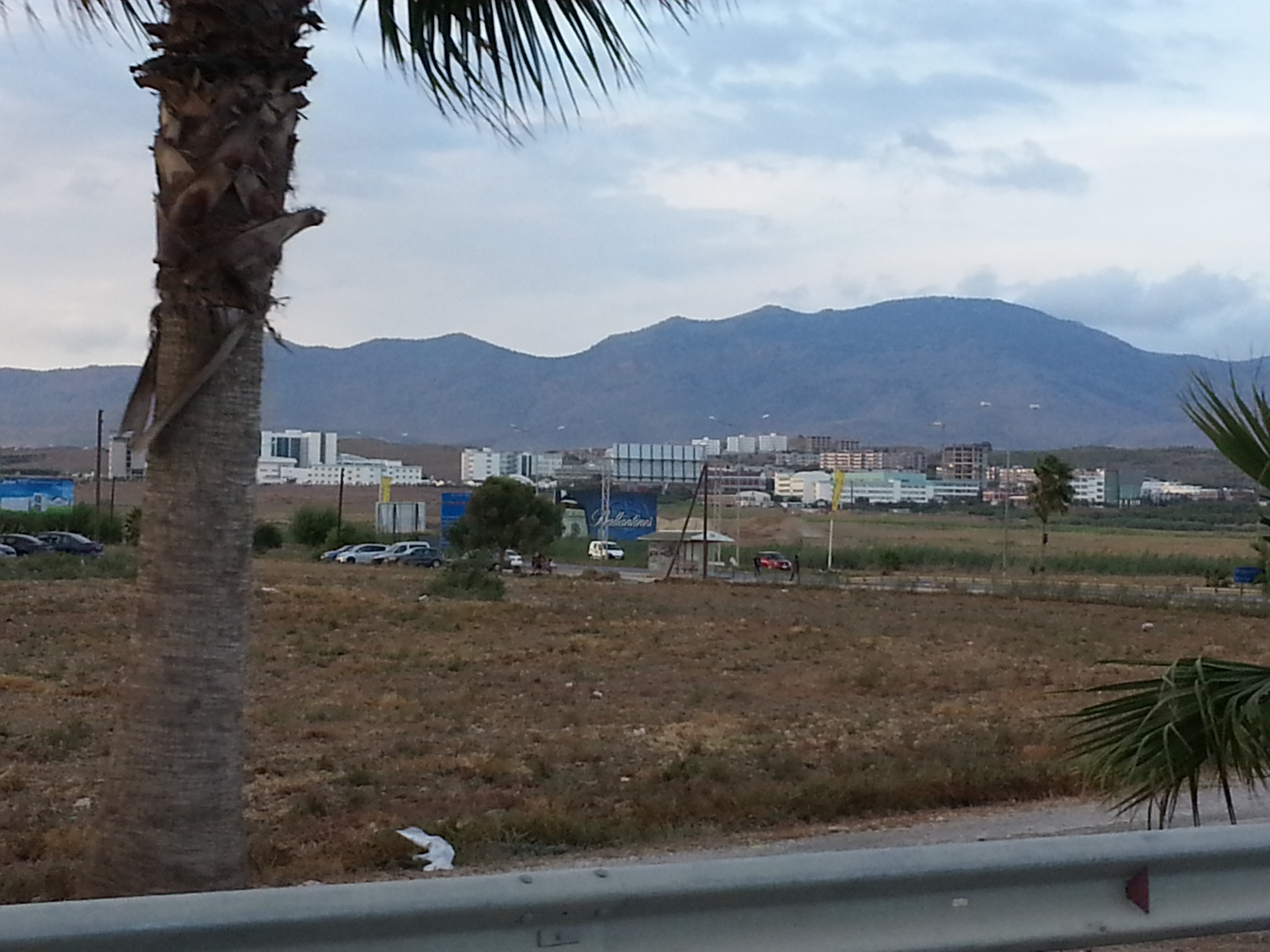
Near East University campus as seen from Nicosia

All the facilities and educational institutions of the university are located in the campus, along with the Near East College (middle and high school levels), the Near East Primary School and the Near East Kindergarten. The campus is a few kilometres away from the city of Nicosia, accessible through the Near East Boulevard. Transportation between the campus and the city is done through frequent buses that circulate through the city, including Gönyeli and the university.

The campus hosts the Atatürk Culture and Congress Centre, the biggest hall in North Nicosia, with a main hall capacity of 700 people and stage area of 163.85 square metres. The hall hosts many congresses, concerts, dance shows and other cultural events, such as the annual international Cyprus Theatre Festival. The centre also hosts four other, smaller halls. The campus is also home to three more amphitheatres and the quartet amphitheatres located in the Grand Library. The campus is also home to three museums: the Communications Museum, the Art Museum and the Museum of Classical and Sports Cars.

The Museum of Classical and Sports Cars of Near East University was established in 2007 and has over 140 vehicles on display. A mobile app is available in both English and Turkish for visitors to learn the features of the cars on display.

== Organisation ==
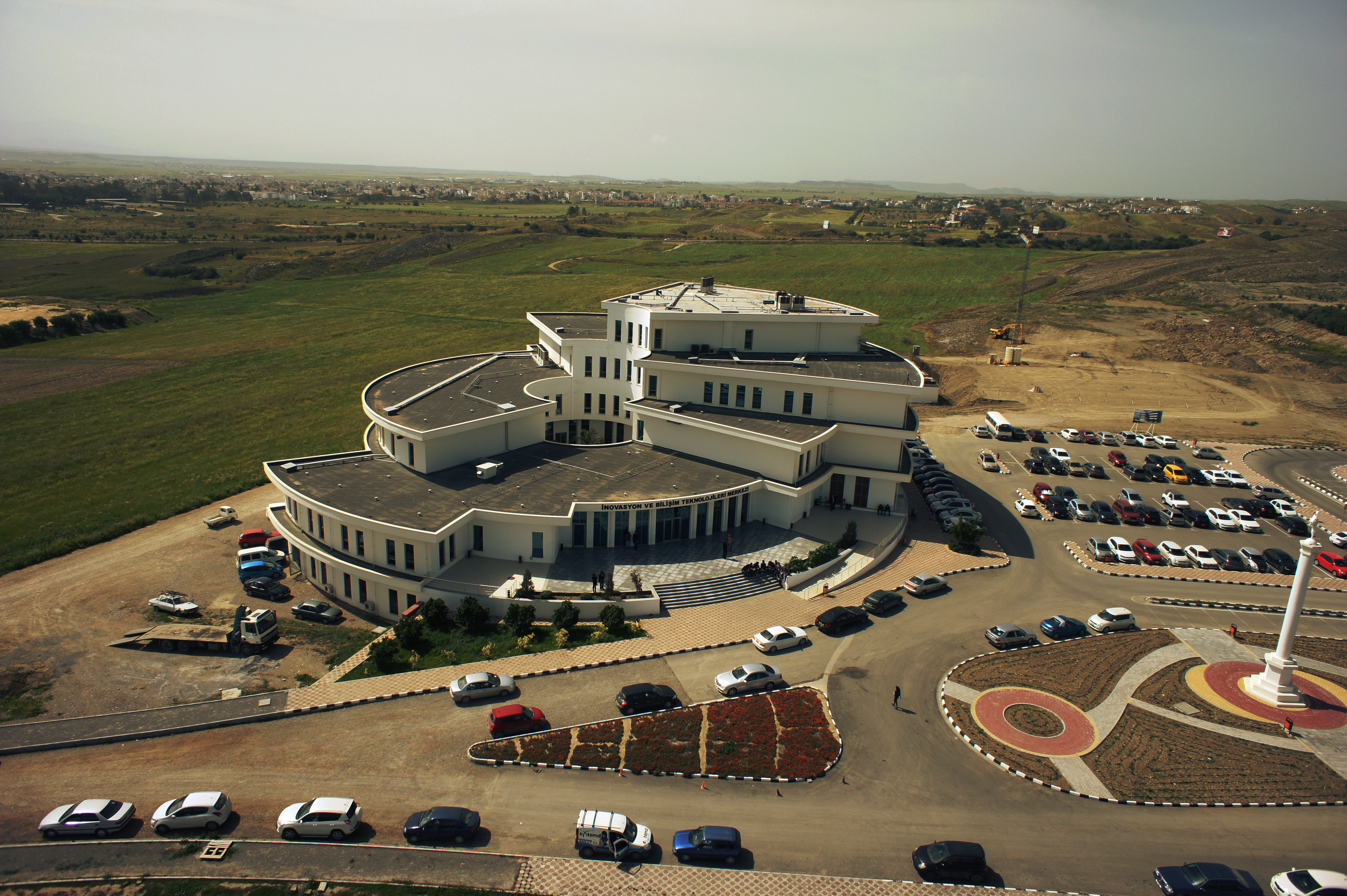
The faculty of engineering

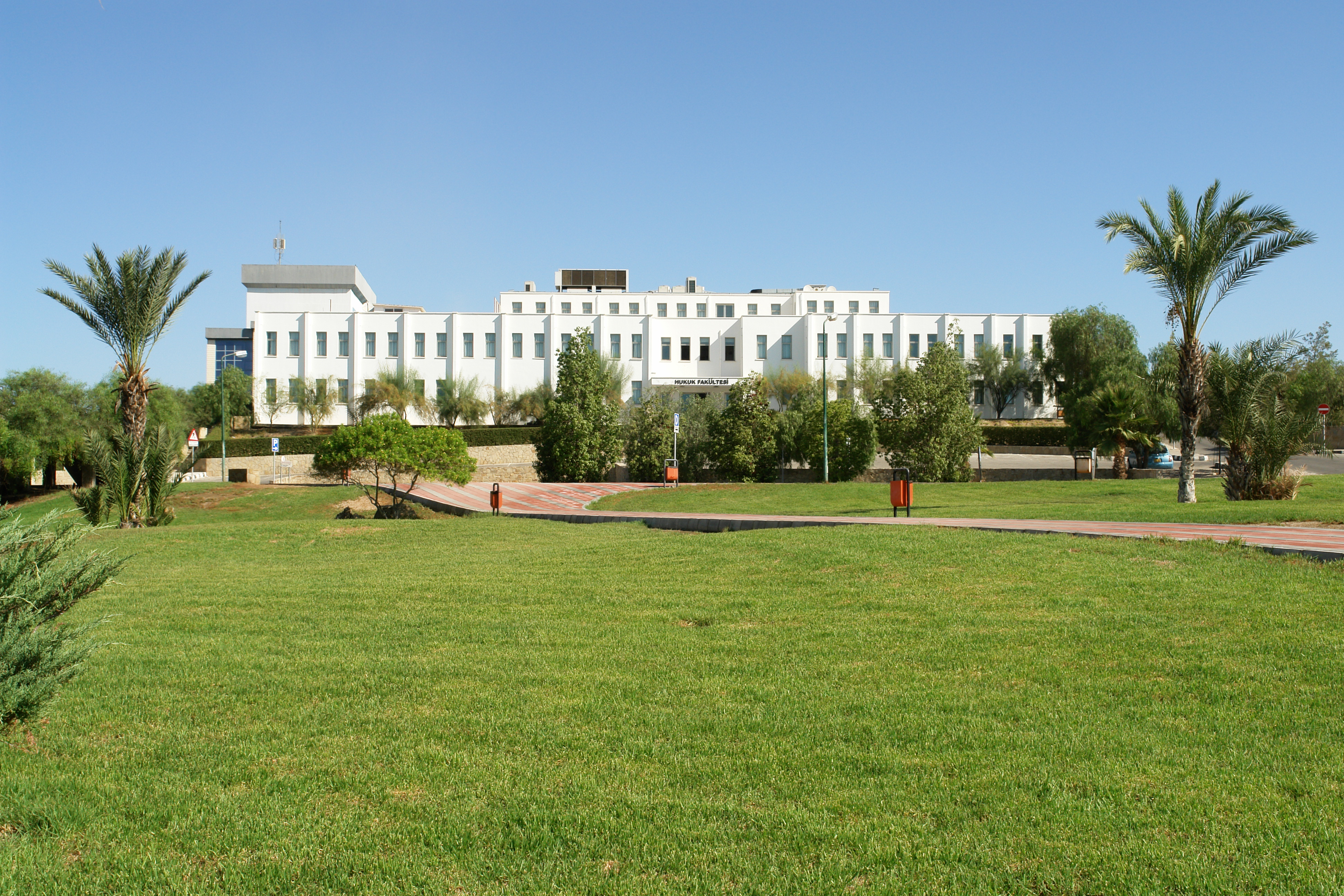
The faculty of law

The university has 16 faculties with 90 departments. Below is a list of the faculties:

- Atatürk Faculty of Education
- Faculty of Architecture
- Faculty of Arts and Sciences
- Faculty of Communication
- Faculty of Dentistry
- Faculty of Divinity
- Faculty of Economics and Administrative Sciences
- Faculty of Engineering
- Faculty of Fine Arts and Design
- Faculty of Health Sciences
- Faculty of Law
- Faculty of Maritime Studies
- Faculty of Medicine
- Faculty of Performing Arts
- Faculty of Pharmacy
- Faculty of Veterinary Medicine

Near East University's Faculty of Pharmacy was accredited by the Accreditation Council for Pharmacy Education (ACPE) in 2014.

== Academic profile ==
=== Faculty of medicine and hospital ===
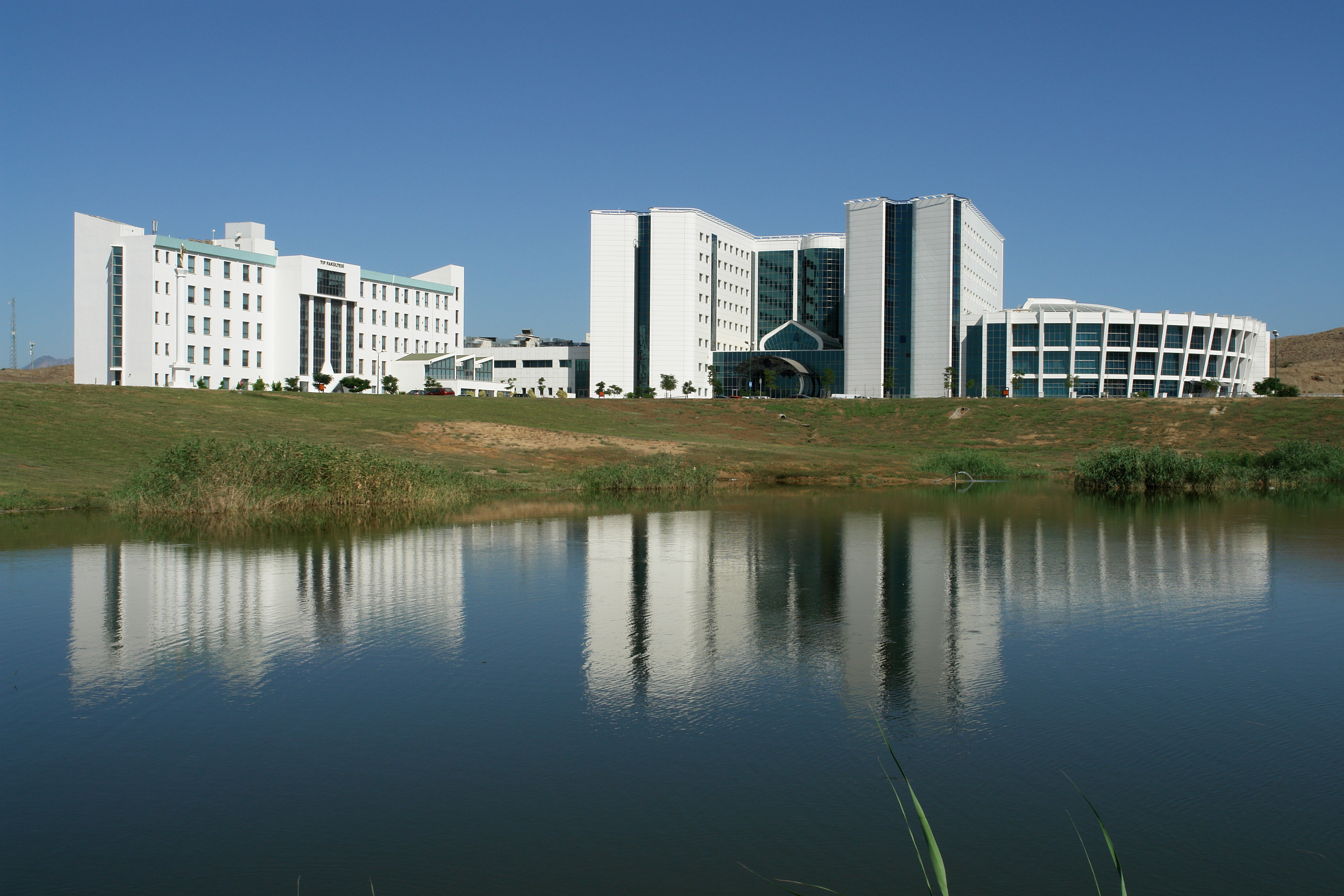
The faculty of medicine and the hospital

The faculty of medicine was opened in 2008 and the hospital, with an area of 55,000 square metres, was inaugurated in 2009. The hospital is accompanied by other research centres such as the Nuclear Medicine Research Centre.

The hospital has treated many important figures, including Rauf Denktaş and agreements have been signed between the university and Gagauzia, according to which Gagauzian patients are transferred to the hospital. The faculty of medicine has also been involved in public health campaigns in the country, including the check-ups of students in schools and offers in vitro fertilisation services. It received the WORLDCOB Institutional Excellence Award in 2013.

=== Grand library ===
The Grand Library covers an area over 15,000 square metres and is home to over 1 million printed materials and more than 150 million electronic resources. It hosts four amphitheatres with a total capacity of 1000 and is not closed at any time. In 2007, around 7000 people used the library daily. In 2019 the university signed a protocol with the Turkish Ministry of Culture and Tourism that foresaw the sharing of its electronic resources with 1118 libraries in Turkey.

=== Research ===
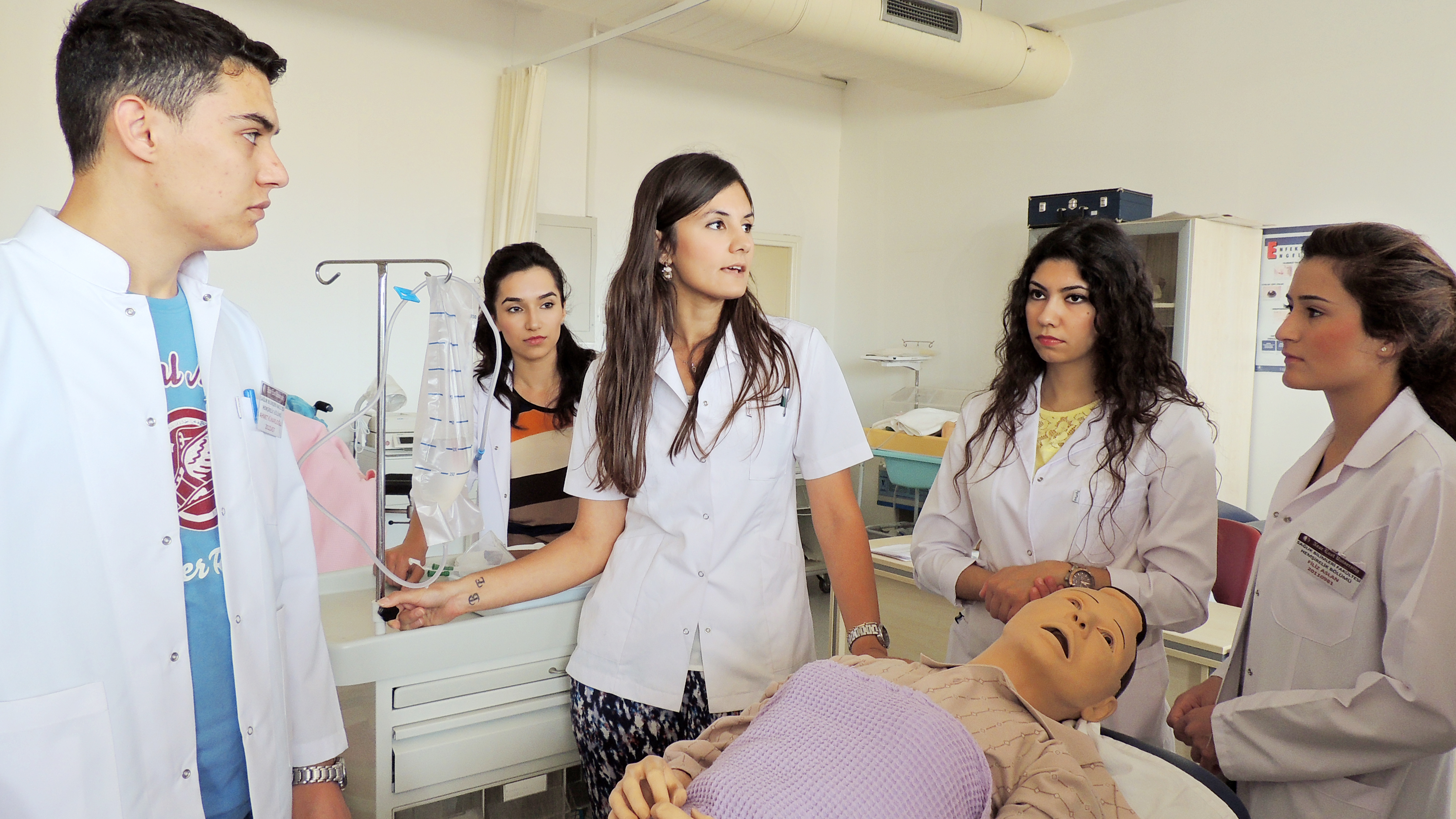
The nursing lab of the Faculty of Health Sciences

The university has a supercomputer that ranks 13th in the world and first in the region in terms of computation speed and capacity. It is used to provide assistance to Turkish universities for research, and participates in the Help Conquer Cancer project, as well as the Large Hadron Collider experiment at CERN. In 2014, it also joined research on the search for treatments for the Ebola virus disease. The NEU-IBM research center, of which the supercomputer is a part of a mission to create a Northern Cyprus Research Area within the framework of the European Research Area, and conducts research in various fields, including health sciences, chemistry, physics, astronomy, architecture, engineering and mathematics.

A research team in the Near East University produced the country's first locally produced car, RA 25, in 2014. The car was powered completely by solar energy, and took part in the South African Solar Challenge, finishing at the 8th place. Currently, a more advanced model of the car, RA 26 is being designed, with the ultimate aim of producing cars that are feasible for families.

The university has an herbarium founded in 2006 by Salih Gucel, the curator. The university has a number of research centers on various topics, ranging from history and politics to tissue engineering. The university has collaborated with the Eastern Mediterranean University to conduct on the research on the seas around Cyprus, regarding the water quality, marine biodiversity, genetic sequencing of marine organisms and the factors that threaten them.

== Fees ==
For 2016–17, annual tuition fees for medicine and dentistry were €12,500 for any other facilities were €5,600, plus 5% VAT, €105 registration fee, €200 annual social activity fee and €50 health insurance.

== Student life ==
=== Sports ===
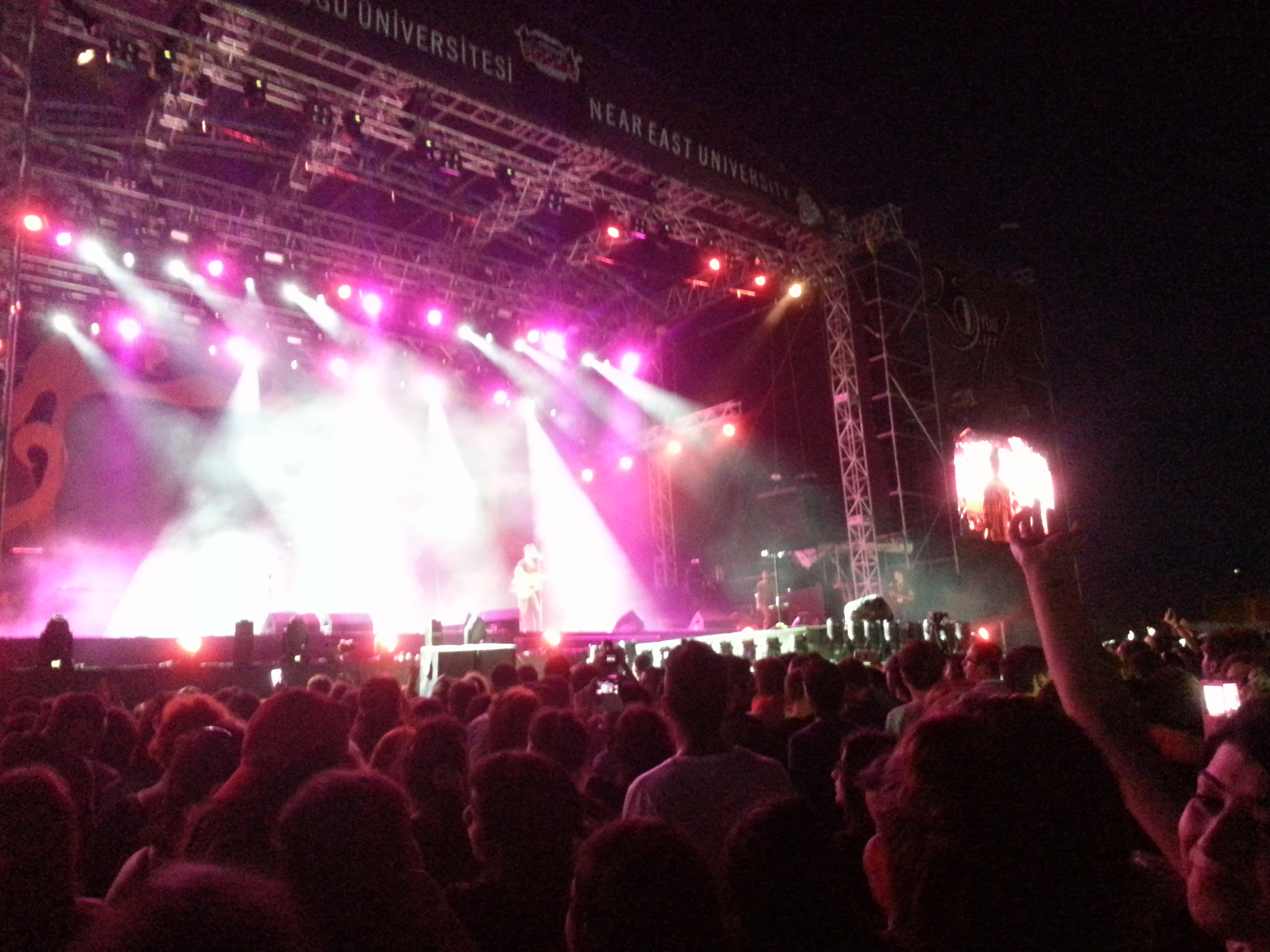
The 2014 Rock 'n Cyprus festival in Park Near East

The university has a number of sports clubs and teams that are open to students. There is also a synchronised swimming team that regularly organises performances. The teams also takes part in Turkish national leagues.

The university is home to the only olympic swimming pool in the country, with an area of 2700 square metres. Members of the swimming team of the university have won medals in championships in Turkey and represented Turkey in international competitions, while the university holds a number of Turkish Cypriot records. More than 12000 people have attended swimming courses in the pool.

In 2014, a new sports hall, named after the solar car RA 25 was opened. A health and wellness centre with an area of 2000 square metres is also present in the campus.

=== Entertainment ===
The university annually holds a spring fest, during which famous Turkish Cypriot, Turkish and international singers and bands perform, dance festivals, sports and board game competitions are held. In 2014, the university built the Park Near East on an area of 220000 thousand square metres, and the concerts of Deep Purple and Turkish bands such as Yüksek Sadakat drew tens of thousands of spectators from Cyprus and Turkey. During the festival, the Moscow State Ballet also performed in the university. The university also hosts the annual Rock 'n Cyprus festival, at which bands from Turkey perform.

The university organises the NEU Nicosia Carnival at the Dereboyu region of the city, at which the students display their culture and the locals crowd into the streets. It also organises trips around Cyprus every September for the students.

=== Civic activities ===
Students of the university often hold philanthropic events and raise money for charity, including causes such as earthquake victims, a local children's village and cancer patients.

== Notable alumni ==
- Irfan Günsel, chairman of the board of trustees, Near East University
