= Interreligious Coordinating Council in Israel =

The Interreligious Coordinating Council in Israel (ICCI) was founded in 1991 to further understanding and communication between members of different faith communities and to build foundations for lasting fellowship.

"Our mission is to harness the teachings and values of the three Abrahamic faiths and transform religion's role from a force of division and extremism into a source of reconciliation, coexistence and understanding for the leaders and followers of these religions in Israel and in our region."

In 2015, ICCI became associated with Rabbis for Human Rights.

An umbrella organization, ICCI works with about sixty Jewish, Muslim, and Christian organizations in Israel. Included are Jewish-Arab groups, various interfaith forums, institutes, universities, and museums. The ICCI also associates with several international institutions: Religions for Peace, affiliated with the United Nations; and the International Council of Christians and Jews, a group which also fosters dialogue between Jews, Christians, and Muslims.

The ICCI was founded by its first director Rabbi Dr. Ron Kronish, who retired in 2015. Educated in America (Brandeis, Hebrew Union College, Harvard), he has since 1980 served the community in Jerusalem, where he resides. He also writes and blogs in the media. ICCI found a new director, Yonatan Shefa, a resident of the Jerusalem area. A veteran of human rights and community action work, he also studies at Yeshiva Sulam Ya'akov for the rabbinate. Originally from Toronto, he's a graduate of McGill University, with a masters from the Kennedy School of Government at Harvard University. ICCI's organization is supported by the staff and works in consultation with Council trustees.

Core values of the ICCI are: dialogue and action, local and regional involvement, participation by the community and by the individual, building long-term relationships, and use of faith texts and values for "learning from each other". ICCI posts blogs on the internet about such current issues and developments, and reflections thereon. Although both dialogue and action are on its agenda, the ICCI believes that "Dialogue is not enough."

Accordingly, for the last several years ICCI has sought to abate crimes of domestic terrorism, especially those associated with the slogan "price tag" [Hebrew: tag melchir], alleged to be done by a small faction of Israeli settlers. The ICCI's counter program is called Tag Meir (spreading the light). Tag Meir proponents and others fear that the unsolved acts of vandalism and violence against 'civilian enemies' that are claimed by "price tag" will harm Israel's moral standing. Members of the ICCI, through the Tag Meir program, visit the victims to show their support; they have coordinated in public demonstrations with thirty other organizations. Tag Meir is also active in helping other victims of similar attacks.

The ICCI publishes a newsletter, and distributes articles and media promoting dialogue, understanding, and activism for peace. Included is the film I am Joseph your Brother. ICCI produces a poster in Hebrew showing the Golden Rule as it's articulated in the world's religions, including Judaism, Christianity, and Islam. Among recent programs sponsored by the ICCI is a Jewish-Muslim dialogue group for professionals and community leaders which meets in Haifa. According to Rabbi Kronish:

"Jewish-Muslim Dialogue is a rare phenomenon in Israel. As far as I know, we (within the Interreligious Coordinating Council in Israel) are the only ones doing it. ... [¶] I have come to believe in recent years that a healthy Jewish-Muslim Dialogue is not only an imperative for us in Israel, but one that is doable and practical, since both sides have much to gain, both in terms of knowledge and in terms of enabling us to learn to live together in the same society."

Within the ICCI there are sections for Religious Leaders, Youth and Young Adults, Interfaith Study Tours, and Interreligious Activism. The section for religious leaders seeks to promote "Education, dialogue and action programs encompassing the spectrum of religious communities in Israel."

== See also ==
- Religions for Peace
- World Congress of Imams and Rabbis for Peace
- The Centre for the Study of Muslim-Jewish Relations
- International Council of Christians and Jews
- New Israel Fund
