= Vinod Adani =

Indian-born billionaire (born 1949)

- Born: Vinod Shantilal Adani; 1949 (age 76–77); Gujarat, India
- Citizenship: Cyprus
- Occupation: Businessman
- Organisation: Adani Group
- Spouse: Ranjanben Vinod Adani
- Relatives: Gautam Adani (brother)

Vinod Shantilal Adani (born 1949), also known as Vinod Shantilal Shah, is an Indian-born Cypriot billionaire businessman who runs a family investment office in Dubai. He is the owner of Excel Investment and Advisory Services.

As of 2025, he has a net worth of $16.4 billion.

== Personal life ==
Vinod was born in 1949 in Gujarat, India into Adani family who was involved in commodity trading. He is the elder brother of the Indian billionaire Gautam Adani. He is married to Ranjanben Vinod Adani and has been a resident of Dubai since 1994 and is a citizen of Cyprus.

== Career ==
Vinod Adani initially joined his family business. In 1976, he founded a textile business, VR Textile, in Mumbai. In 1989, he moved to Singapore to trade commodities.

In 1994, Vinod moved to Dubai and established a network of overseas shell companies, as disclosed in the Panama Papers. He founded GA International in the Bahamas in January 1994, listing himself and his wife, Ranjanben Vinod Adani, as directors. In 1996, he changed his name to Vinod Shantilal Shah, a name appearing in various corporate filings related to Adani companies. Later, he assisted Gautam Adani in the diamond trade and the import-export sector, overseeing international shipments from Jebel Ali Port. He also helped raise financing for the development of Mundra Port in India.

In 2010, Vinod took control of Electrogen Infra, and its parent company, Electrogen Infra Holdings.

In 2014, Directorate of Revenue Intelligence of India accused Vinod Adani of involvement in a scheme to inflate the cost of imported power machinery to evade taxes and divert approximately $900 million to a Mauritius-based company linked to him. The investigation was later expanded to include allegations of price inflation in imported coal to increase charges for power supply to Indian electricity distribution companies.

In 2016, Vinod was named in the Panama Papers.

In January 2021, TotalEnergies acquired a 20 percent stake in publicly traded Adani Green Energy not through the open market, but by purchasing two Mauritius-based entities owned by Vinod Adani. In September 2022, the Adani Group's $6.5 billion acquisition of stakes in two Indian cement companies from Swiss firm Holcim was similarly conducted via a Mauritius firm controlled by Vinod and his wife.

A 2023 report by Hindenburg Research criticized Vinod Adani's management of overseas shell companies, alleging financial improprieties aimed at manipulating company finances and securing funding for international projects. The report identified 38 shell entities in Mauritius and additional companies in Cyprus, the United Arab Emirates, Singapore, and several Caribbean islands controlled by Vinod Adani or his associates. These entities were reported to facilitate the movement of funds within the Adani conglomerate without clear operational activities. Further investigation by the Wall Street Journal and Bloomberg revealed a Singapore-based company associated with Vinod Adani, Abbot Point Port Holdings Pte. Ltd., which received over $1.1 billion in loans from Adani Global Investment DMCC, a Dubai-based investment firm managed by him, during the 2021 and 2022 fiscal years. These funds were subsequently lent to Adani Group companies involved in Australian coal, railway, and port businesses. The Securities and Exchange Board of India (SEBI) investigation revealed in April 2024, that Adani Group companies were receiving funding from up to twelve offshore funds. Eight of the twelve accused offshore funds approached the SEBI and paid penalties to settle the accusation charges.

== Wealth ==
As per 2022 Hurun India Rich List, Vinod was named as the richest non-resident Indian, and the sixth-richest Indian overall, with a fortune of ₹169,000 crore (US$20.42 billion). According to Forbes' investigation in 2023, he owns an apartment in Singapore and 37 properties in Dubai, including one in the Burj Khalifa. Vinod owns a 19,000 square feet (1,800 m^{2}) villa in Emirates Hills, Dubai, which Forbes estimated in 2025 to be worth approximately US$10 million.
