= Yakir Gabay =

Israeli businessman

- יקיר גבאי
- Born: 1966 (age 59–60); Jerusalem, Israel
- Citizenship: Cypriot
- Education: Hebrew University
- Occupation: Real estate businessman
- Known for: Owns 10% of Aroundtown SA
- Title: Deputy chairman of the advisory board, Aroundtown SA
- Spouse: Elena Gabay
- Parent: Meir Gabay

Yakir Gabay (Hebrew: יקיר גבאי; born 1966) is a Cypriot-Israeli billionaire real estate businessman, based in Cyprus. He owns 10% of Frankfurt-listed Luxembourgish real estate company Aroundtown SA.

Gabay is the son of Meir Gabay, a former Director-General of the Israeli Ministry of Justice who also served as the Civil Service Commissioner of Israel, in addition to being elected the President of the United Nations Administrative Tribunal. Yemima Gabay, his mother, was a senior at the Israeli State Attorney's Office and Director of the Pardons Department in the State of Israel's Ministry of Justice. In 2026 Gabay joined the Gaza Executive Board of Peace. Ynet estimated his networth at 4.1B$.

== Early life ==
Gabay was born in Jerusalem. He completed a BS degree in economics and accounting, and an MBA degree in finance and business development at the Hebrew University.

== Career ==
Gabay started his career in the Prospectus Department of Israel’s SEC.

He then served in management positions in the capital market as an investment banker. In the mid-1990s, he served as CEO of the investment banking division of Bank Leumi. At the beginning of 2000, Gabay served as chairman and partner of Gmul Investments, which then managed investments for pension funds, in real estate and securities totaling $30 Billions.

In 2004, Gabay established real estate investment activity in Berlin and expanded to other large cities in Germany, UK and the Netherlands in the residential, hotel and office markets. He co-invested with private investors as well as institutional investors amongst the largest in the world mainly through the real estate companies Aroundtown and Grand City Properties. The Group's properties are located in the major cities of Germany, UK and the Netherlands.

== Aroundtown SA and Grand City Properties S.A. ==
In mid-2012, Gabay issued Grand City Properties SA, a residential company, at a company value of €150 million and price share of €2.7. The issue is considered most successful on the Frankfurt Stock Exchange. The company is traded on prime standard segment of the Frankfurt stock exchange, with total assets over €10 billion and at a market cap of €3.6 billion with price share of €20 (as of December 2020), and is included in the major stock indices such as MDAX.

In mid-2015, Gabay listed the shares of Aroundtown SA in both Euronext Paris and the Frankfurt Stock Exchange, at a company value of €1.5 billion and share price of €3.2. The listing was successful with more than doubling of the share price to 6.2 in December 2020 The company is traded on the prime standard segment of Frankfurt stock exchange, at a market value of €10 billion (as of December 2020) and is included in the main stock indices such as MDAX.

Aroundtown SA and Grand City Properties are both ranked by Standard & Poor's Global Ratings BBB +.

=== Merger with TLG ===
Aroundtown which is the largest listed commercial real estate company in Germany, merged in February 2020 with TLG Immobilien AG which was traded on the Frankfurt Stock Exchange with market cap of over €3 billion. The merged company Aroundtown SA is traded on the prime standard segment of Frankfurt stock exchange, at a market value of €10 billion (as of December 2020) and is included in the main stock indices such as MDAX. As of Q3 2020 total assets of Aroundtown are over €32 billion.

Gabay held 36% of the shares of Aroundtown SA.

In September 2019 Gabay sold €1.5 worth of Aroundtown shares which reduced his holdings in Aroundtown to around 15% as of January 2026. Aroundtown SA owns 40 percent of Grand City Properties, whose portfolio includes 60,000 apartments in Germany and over 3,000 in London.

=== Management strategy ===
The strategy of the companies is based on the acquisition of real estate properties in central locations, their improvement and optimize return and creates an efficient management.

== Personal life ==
He is married to Elena, and they split their time between London, England and Cyprus.

Gabay was involved in a long-standing group chat from October 2023 through early May 2024 with some of the United States' most powerful business leaders with the stated goals of "chang[ing] the narrative" in favor of Israel and "help[ing] win the war" on U.S. public opinion following Hamas's October 7th attack on Israel. Members of the group chat discussed how they received private briefings by, and worked closely with, members of the Israeli government, including former Israeli prime minister Naftali Bennett; Benny Gantz, a member of the Israeli war cabinet; and Israel’s ambassador to the United States, Michael Herzog. Group members also held a video call in late April 2024 with New York City Mayor Eric Adams in an effort to, according to reporting by The Washington Post, "pressure Columbia’s president and trustees to permit the mayor to send police to the campus" to shut down criticism of Israel's offensive military operations in Gaza, which many campus protesters, intergovernmental and non-governmental organizations, civil servants, and governments around the world have found to be genocide. During the video call, group members discussed making political donations to Adams. A spokesperson said Gabay did not donate to Adams.

On January 17, 2026, the United States President Donald J. Trump announced the appointment of Yakir Gabay as a member of the "Gaza Executive Board of Peace".
