= Polys Haji-Ioannou =

Cypriot billionaire businessman

- Πόλυς Χατζηιωάννου
- Born: 1959 or 1960 (age 65–66)
- Occupation: Businessman
- Known for: Founder of Polyar Tankers; major shareholder of EasyJet
- Spouse: Rosemarie Zoudrou (m. 2001)
- Children: 2
- Parent: Loucas Haji-Ioannou
- Relatives: Stelios Haji-Ioannou (brother); Clelia Haji-Ioannou (sister)

Polys Haji-Ioannou (Greek: Πόλυς Χατζηιωάννου, born 1959/1960) is a Cypriot billionaire businessman, known for his shipping company Polyar Tankers and as a significant shareholder in the airline EasyJet, which was founded by his brother Stelios Haji-Ioannou.

== Early life ==
Haji-Ioannou was born in Cyprus to shipping magnate Loucas Haji-Ioannou (1927–2008), who built up a large shipping fleet beginning in the 1950s. His siblings include Stelios Haji-Ioannou, the founder of EasyJet, and Clelia Haji-Ioannou.

== Career ==
=== Polyar Tankers ===
Haji-Ioannou is the founder and owner of Polyar Tankers, a shipping company established in the early 1990s. The company has managed a fleet of around 20 oil tanker vessels.

=== EasyJet shareholding ===
Haji-Ioannou holds a significant stake in EasyJet, which was founded in 1995 by his brother Stelios. His stake in the company forms a large part of his personal fortune. In 2013, he and his siblings sold a portion of their shares to protest EasyJet's expansion strategy.

=== Safe Bulkers ===
Haji-Ioannou is chairman and chief executive officer of the dry bulk shipping company Safe Bulkers Inc., a position he has held since its 2008 listing on the New York Stock Exchange. He is also the largest individual shareholder, holding approximately 27–28% of the company's shares, making Safe Bulkers effectively under his control.

== Net worth ==
As of 2023, Haji-Ioannou’s net worth was estimated at around US$1.1 billion, according to Forbes. Other financial media, such as GoodReturns, have reported similar figures of US$1.2 billion.

== Personal life ==
In 2001, Haji-Ioannou married Rosemarie Zoudrou; they have two children and reside in Monaco.

== See also ==
- List of Cypriot billionaires by net worth
