= CMB.TECH =

Belgian oil transport company

CMB.TECH NV
- Type: Public
- Traded as: Euronext Brussels: EURN
- Industry: Transport, Marine, Oil and Gas
- Founded: 1995
- Headquarters: Antwerp, Belgium
- Key people: Alexander Saverys (CEO); Ludovic Saverys (CFO)
- Products: Shipping; Oil
- Number of employees: 1,700 (2013)
- Website: https://cmb.tech/

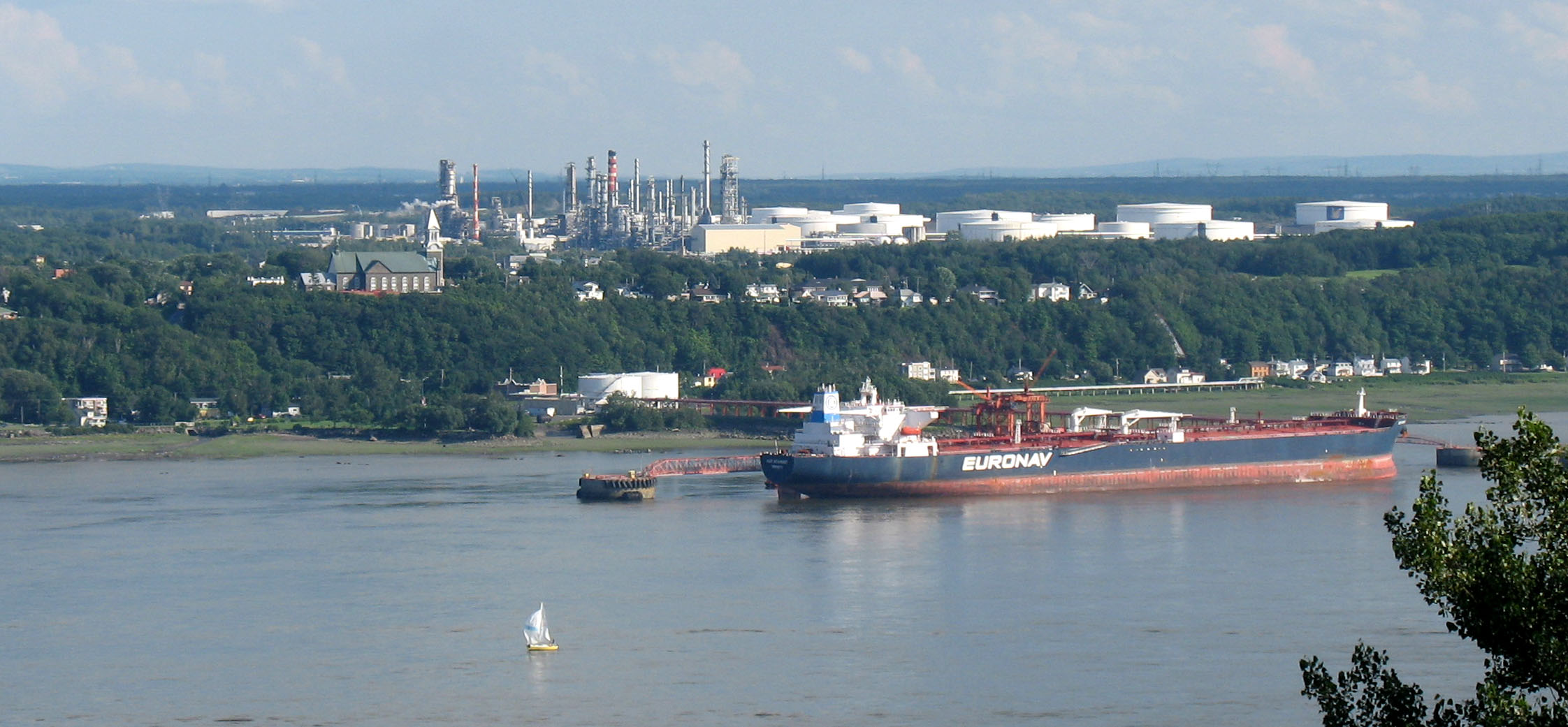
Euronav tanker in Québec City, Canada

CMB.TECH, before October 2024 known as Euronav, is a crude oil tanker transport company, which consists of VLCCs, Suezmaxes and FSOs.

In October 2024, Euronav became CMB.TECH following a name change. CMB.TECH is a diversified and future-proof maritime group. The group owns and operates approximately 250 seagoing vessels: crude oil tankers, dry bulk carriers, container ships.

== History ==
Euronav originated from the European Navigation Company Ltd, a tanker shipping company acquired by the French shipping company Compagnie Nationale de Navigation (CNN). In 1995 European Navigation Company Ltd merged into a joint venture with the Belgian national shipping line Compagnie Maritime Belge (CMB) and continued under the name Euronav Luxembourg NV. In 1997, following CMB's acquisition of CNN, Euronav Luxembourg NV became wholly owned by CMB and functioned as its tanker shipping division.

In 1997, the management decided to renew the tanker fleet of six single-hull ships with a series of double-hull ships built by Daewoo Shipbuilding & Marine Engineering (DSME). These new ships were larger than the tankers they replaced. In January 2000, Euronav along with several other shipping companies, founded the Tankers International Pool. This collaboration allowed the tanker fleet to be operated more economically.

On December 1, 2004, Euronav received its own stock market listing. On that day, Euronav shares were issued to CMB shareholders. Six months later, in April 2005, Euronav entered into a strategic alliance with the Greek shipping company Tanklog Ltd. This action expanded the fleet with 14 Suezmax and 2 Aframax ships. This transaction was valued at $1.1 billion. Tanklog was partly paid in shares, making it the second-largest shareholder of Euronav after CMB.

In January 2014, Euronav acquired 15 VLCC tankers from Maersk Tankers Singapore Pte Ltd, a subsidiary of A.P. Møller-Mærsk Group. The new tankers also became part of the Tankers International VLCC pool.

In mid-2015, Euronav purchased four tankers under construction at Hyundai Heavy Industries. The selling shipping company received $384 million or $98 million per ship. The vessels were delivered in 2015 and 2016.

On December 22, 2017, Euronav announced a merger with the American Gener8 Maritime. Gener8 shareholders received 0.7272 Euronav shares for each Gener8 share. The new combination had a fleet of 75 crude oil tankers, including 28 Suezmax vessels, with a total carrying capacity of more than 18 million tons. Former Gener8 shareholders received a 28% stake in the new company, which continued as Euronav. The acquisition was completed on June 13, 2018. A day later, Euronav sold six VLCC tankers to International Seaways.

In early April 2022, the merger with the Norwegian competitor Frontline Ltd. was announced. In the new constellation, the name Euronav would disappear, and the Frontline name would be retained. The combination would be led by Hugo De Stoop, the former CEO of Euronav. Existing Euronav shareholders would receive 1.45 Frontline shares for each Euronav share, giving them approximately 59% of the combination. The Saverys family opposed the merger and increased their stake in Euronav to 25% to block the transaction. In January 2023, Frontline withdrew its takeover bid.

In October 2023, the two major shareholders, CMB and Frontline, reached an agreement. The takeover by Frontline could not proceed, but Frontline had acquired a significant package of Euronav shares. The agreement stipulated that Frontline would sell its 26% stake in Euronav to CMB for $18.43 per share and that Frontline would acquire 24 VLCC tankers from Euronav's fleet for $2.35 billion. The parties also decided to drop all lawsuits. After purchasing this share package, CMB obtained a majority stake of 53% in Euronav. On February 14, 2024, CMB made an offer for all Euronav shares it did not yet own, offering the same amount per share as agreed with Frontline. By March 18, CMB held just over 80% of Euronav shares.

In April 2024, Euronav and Anglo-Eastern Univan Group reached an agreement on the sale of Euronav Ship Management Hellas. Euronav Ship Management Hellas was founded in 2005 and is based in Athens. This transaction will improve Anglo-Eastern's position in the Greek market and in crude oil tankers.

On 7 February 2024, Euronav held a Special Meeting of Shareholders to approve the purchase of 100% of the shares of CMB.TECH NV for a total purchase price of US$1.150 billion in cash.

On 2 July 2024, Euronav held a Special General Meeting & Extraordinary General meeting to approve the name change of Euronav to CMB.TECH. The Extraordinary General meeting approved this resolution and the name change was effective as of 1 October 2024.

On 2 July 2024 the company filed a request to change its ticker from EURN to CMBT. This change was effective as of 15 July on Euronext and NYSE.

On 1 October 2024 the name of the company officially changed to CMB.TECH.
