= Clelia Haji-Ioannou =

Cypriot-British billionaire investor

- Born: January 1, 1970 (age 56); Athens, Greece
- Education: City, University of London
- Occupations: Investor; board member, Cyprus Marine Environment Protection Association
- Known for: Inherited holdings in EasyJet; real estate investments
- Children: 2
- Relatives: Stelios Haji-Ioannou (brother); Polys Haji-Ioannou (brother)

Clelia Haji-Ioannou (born 1970) is a Cypriot-British billionaire and investor. She inherited capital from her father, shipping magnate Loucas Haji-Ioannou, and retains a stake in the airline EasyJet, founded by her brother, Stelios Haji-Ioannou. Her other brother, Polys Haji-Ioannou, is also a billionaire shipping and real estate investor.

== Early life and education ==
Clelia Haji-Ioannou was born in Athens, Greece, in 1970. She studied Banking and International Finance at City, University of London.

== Business interests and activities ==
A primary source of her net worth is her inherited family assets, which include investments in EasyJet. She currently serves on the board of the Cyprus Marine Environment Protection Association (CYMEPA).

== Estimated wealth ==
As of 2024, Forbes estimated her net worth at approximately US $1.1 billion. Other listings, such as the Monaco Voice ranking of Monaco’s wealthiest residents, place her net worth around US $1.2 billion. She is reported to own real estate assets worth around US $200 million in Europe, including properties in London, Monaco, and Greece.

== Personal life ==
Haji-Ioannou is married and has two children. She resides in Monaco.
