= Tender rig =

Tender assisted rigs are an existing type of development drilling, workover or plug and abandonment rig (same "family" as jack up rig, semi-submersible or drillship). However, it is the only design that can operate in both shallow and deepwater (from 20 to 2,000 metres, 66 to 6,562 ft). It is recognized in the industry as one of the most efficient and economical types of rig for development, work over or plug and abandonment (P&A). They are composed of a tender vessel (a specially designed support vessel) and self-contained drilling rigs. The tender vessel is typically equipped with storage facilities (bulk, mud, tubular, spare parts, consumables), living quarters (120 to 200 people), power generation facilities, cranes, and helideck. Tender vessels are typically flat bottom barges or semi-submersible, however in some instances, it a jack up- or semi-submersible rig or liftboat was used.
