= Smedvig =

Norwegian offshore oil rig company

Smedvig asa
- Company type: Public
- Industry: Petroleum
- Founded: 1915
- Headquarters: Stavanger, Norway
- Key people: Kjell E. Jacobsen (CEO); John Fredriksen (Chairman)
- Products: Offshore drilling rigs
- Revenue: ▲NOK 4,219 million (2005)
- Operating income: NOK 1,272 million (2005)
- Net income: NOK 364 million (2005)
- Number of employees: 3,750 (2006)
- Website: www.smedvig.com

Smedvig ASA, ("Smedvig"), (OSE: SME, NYSE: SMVA) was a Norwegian offshore oil rig company headquartered in Stavanger until it was acquired (January 2006) by rig newcomer SeaDrill of tanker mogul John Fredriksen. At time of the merger Smedvig operated two semi submersibles, one drillship and one jack up rig in the Norwegian and British sector of the North Sea. A fleet of seven tender rigs were operated in South East Asia from the Singaporean subsidiary Smedvig Asia. As part of the merger, Smedvig's staff was transferred to Seadrill with Smedvig senior personnel assuming key positions in Seadrill (CEO, CFO etc.). Smedvig was delisted from the OSE and NYSE, while Seadrill is listed on the Oslo Stock Exchange.

== History ==
Smedvig started in 1915 as the shipping company Peder Smedvig Shipping Company by Peder Smedvig. Between 1917 and 1959 Smedvig was also in the canning industry. In the 1960s the company entered the oil age with investments in supply ships, oil tankers and in 1973 the first drilling rig. The company acquired multiple rigs throughout the 1970s and 1980s and in 1988 it bought the competitor Dyvi Offshore.

In 1989 the company was reorganised as a holding company for the Smedvig family's drilling operations and in 1990 the company was listed on the Oslo Stock Exchange. Between 1991 and 1998 the company was also engaged in floating oil production.

In January 2006, Seadrill won a bidding war against U.S. drilling rig company Noble Corporation, and subsequently acquired Smedvig ASA for an equity value of NOK 15 bn (US$2.4 bn). The purchase was Fredriksen's largest deal to date.
