= Peder Smedvig =

Norwegian businessman

Peder Smedvig (1882–1959) was a Norwegian businessman, the founder of Smedvig ASA.

== Career ==
In 1915, Smedvig started a shipping company. In 1935, he started Smedvig Tankrederi, but in World War II, four out of the five ships were lost.

== Personal life ==
After he died in 1959, his son Torolf Smedvig took over the running of the company and the canned food business became a separate company run by another branch of the family.
