= Bygland =

Bygland may refer to:

== Places ==
- Bygland Municipality, a municipality in Agder county, Norway
- Bygland (village), a village within Bygland Municipality in Agder county, Norway
- Bygland Township, Polk County, Minnesota, a township in Minnesota, USA

== Other ==
- Bygland Church, a church in Bygland Municipality in Agder county, Norway
- Bygland IL, a sports club based in Bygland Municipality in Agder county, Norway
