= Byglandsfjord =

Village in Bygland Municipality, Norway

- Village
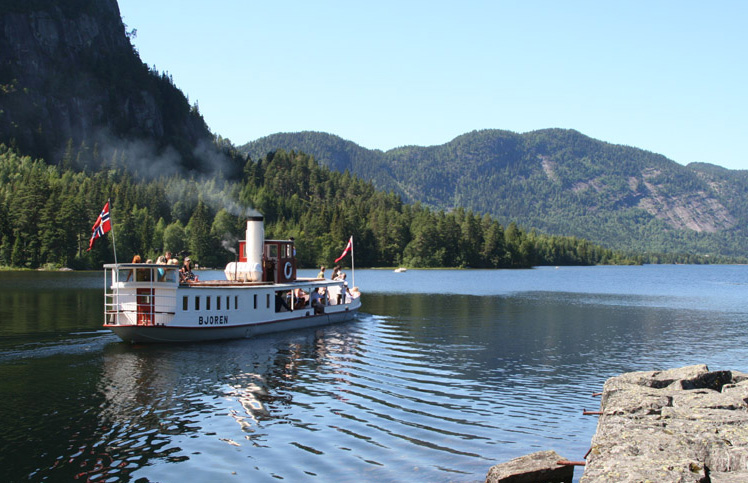
- View of the SS Bjoren on the lake Byglandsfjorden, on its way to Byglandsfjord
- Interactive map of Byglandsfjord
- Coordinates: 58.6661°N 07.8131°E
- Country: Norway
- Region: Southern Norway
- County: Agder
- District: Setesdal
- Municipality: Bygland Municipality

Area
  - Total: 0.47 km^{2} (0.18 sq mi)
- Elevation: 207 m (679 ft)

Population (2025)
  - Total: 343
  - Density: 730/km^{2} (1,900/sq mi)
- Time zone: UTC+01:00 (CET)
  - Summer (DST): UTC+02:00 (CEST)
- Post Code: 4741 Byglandsfjord

Byglandsfjord is a village in Bygland Municipality in Agder county, Norway. The village is located in the Setesdal valley along the Norwegian National Road 9 and the river Otra in the far southern part of the municipality, just north of the border with Evje og Hornnes Municipality and at the southern end of the lake Byglandsfjorden. The Revsnes Hotel is located in the village.

The 0.47-square-kilometre (120-acre) village has a population (2025) of 343 and a population density of 730 inhabitants per square kilometre (1,900/sq mi).

The highest point in the area surrounding the village is the 762-metre (2,500 ft) tall Årdalsknaben, about 1.5 kilometres (0.93 mi) northeast of the village. The village itself sits at an elevation of about 207 metres (679 ft) above sea level. Byglandsfjord is located about 5 kilometres (3.1 mi) south of the village of Grendi and about 13 kilometres (8.1 mi) north of the village of Evje in the neighboring municipality. Byglandsfjord Station, the terminal station of the now defunct Setesdal Line was also located in this village.

== History ==
The steamboat SS Bjoren (1866) travels on the Byglandsfjorden between the villages of Byglandsfjord, Bygland, and Ose during the summer months. The wood-fired steamboat was the former most important transport across the lake, before further transport by horse and carriage up the valley.

== Notable people ==
- Kjell Kristian Rike (1944–2008), a sports commentator
