= Årdal Church (Agder) =

Church in Agder, Norway

- Årdal kyrkje
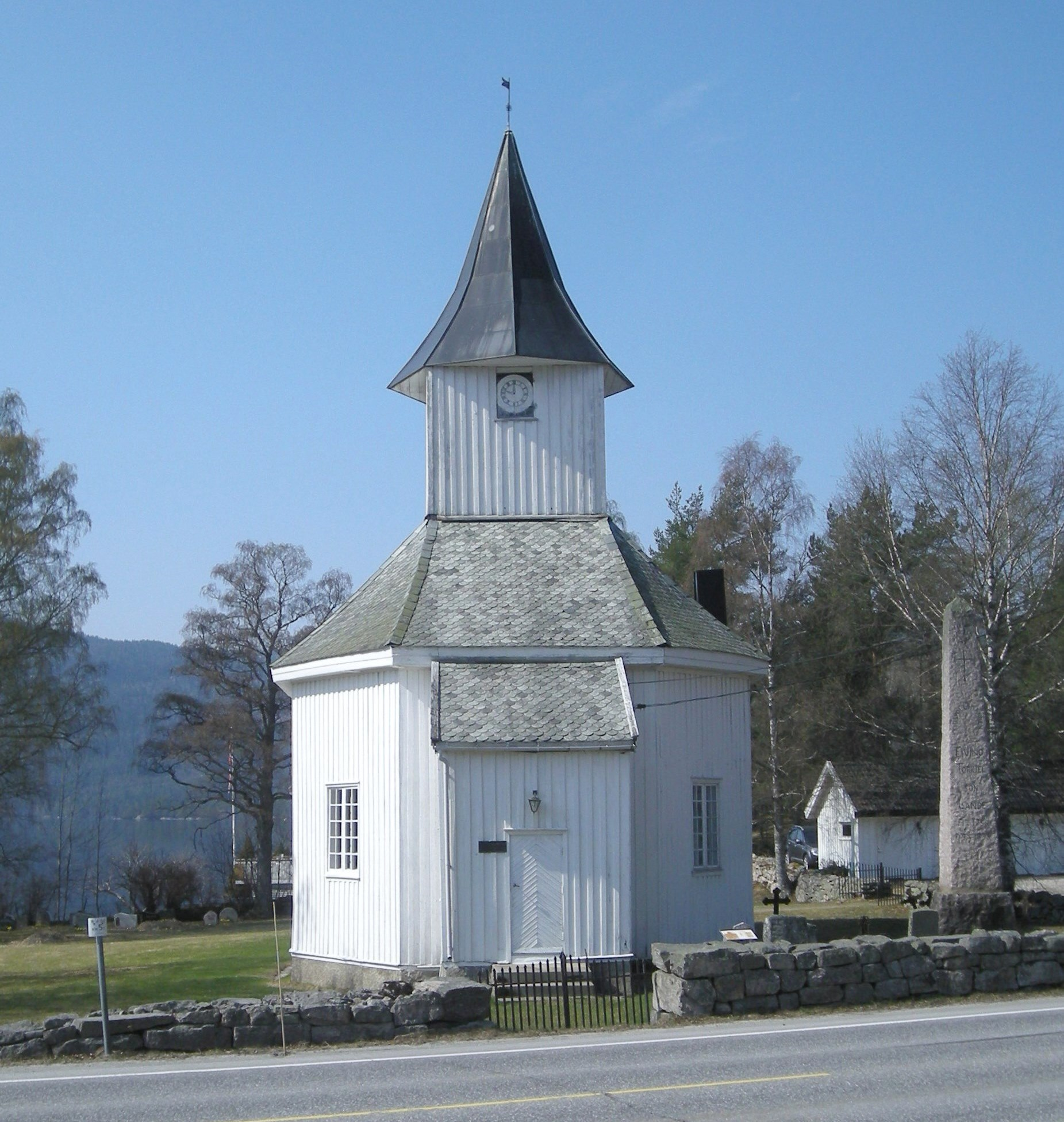
- View of the church
- Årdal Church
- 58.7071°N 07.8239°E
- Location: Bygland Municipality, Agder
- Country: Norway
- Denomination: Church of Norway
- Previous denomination: Catholic Church
- Churchmanship: Evangelical Lutheran

History
- Status: Parish church
- Founded: 13th century
- Consecrated: 1828

Architecture
- Functional status: Active
- Architect: Hans Linstow
- Architectural type: Octagonal
- Completed: 1828 (198 years ago)

Specifications
- Capacity: 200
- Materials: Wood

Administration
- Diocese: Agder og Telemark
- Deanery: Otredal prosti
- Parish: Bygland og Årdal
- Norwegian Cultural Heritage Site
- Type: Church
- Status: Listed
- ID: 85979

Årdal Church (Norwegian: Årdal kyrkje) is a parish church of the Church of Norway in Bygland Municipality in Agder county, Norway. It is located in the village of Grendi, just west of the Norwegian National Road 9, on the shore of the Byglandsfjorden. It is one of the churches for the Bygland og Årdal parish which is part of the Otredal prosti (deanery) in the Diocese of Agder og Telemark. The white, wooden church was built in a octagonal design in 1828 by Anders Thorsen Syrtveit who used plans drawn up by the architect Hans Linstow. The church seats about 200 people.

== History ==
The earliest existing historical records of the church date back to the year 1328, but the church was not new that year. It was likely a stave church that was probably built in the 13th century. In 1604, the old church was torn down and a new Årdal Church was built. The new church was a timber-framed long church. By 1662, it was noted that the church was already in need of extensive repairs. In 1723, the King sold the church to the local farmers in the parish. Due to population growth, in the early 1800s, the parish decided that the church needed to be replaced. In 1828, the old church was torn down and replaced with the present octagonal building. There was a small graveyard surrounding the church, but in the 20th century, some land across the road was acquired as an annex graveyard.

== Media gallery ==
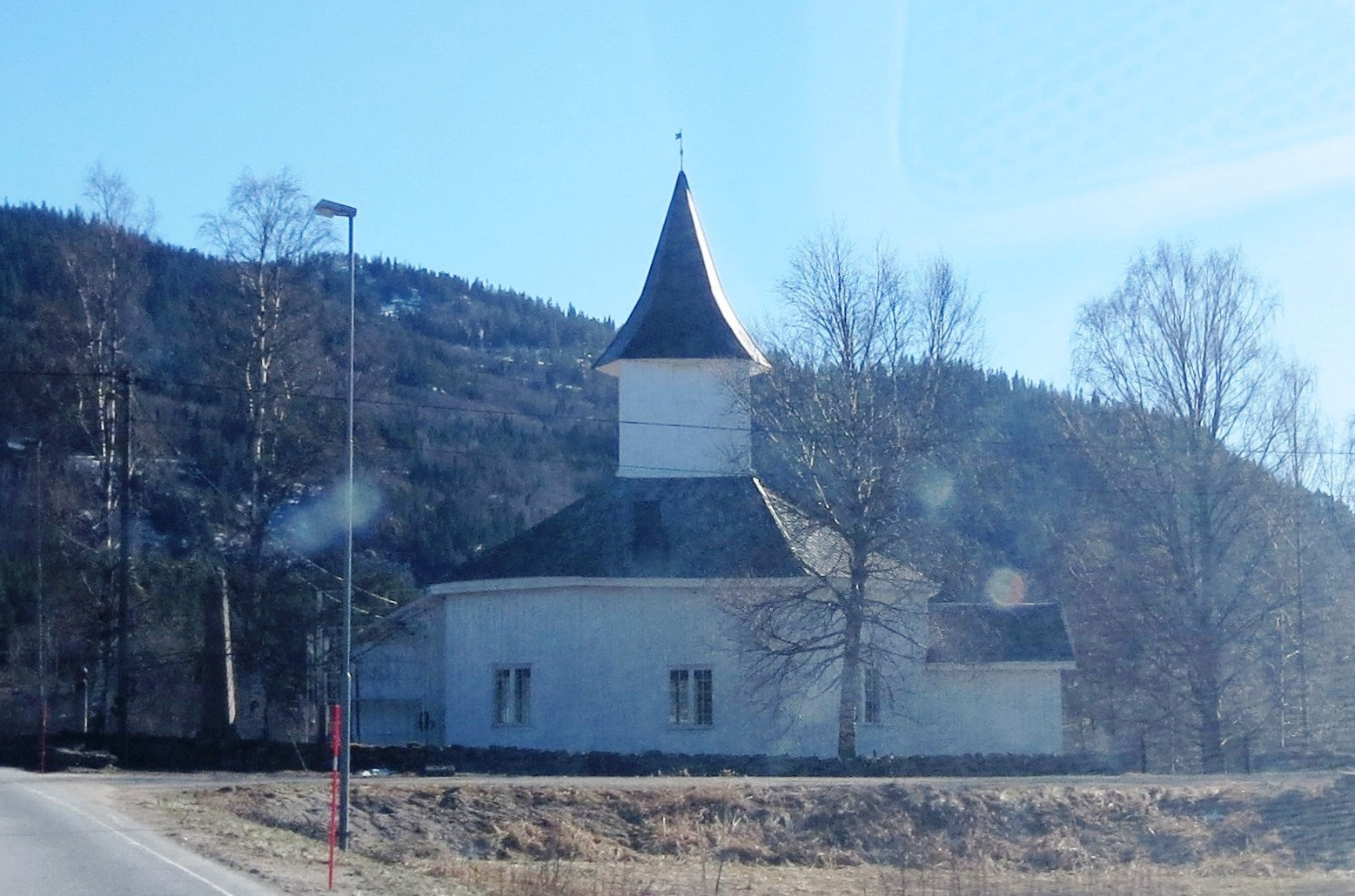

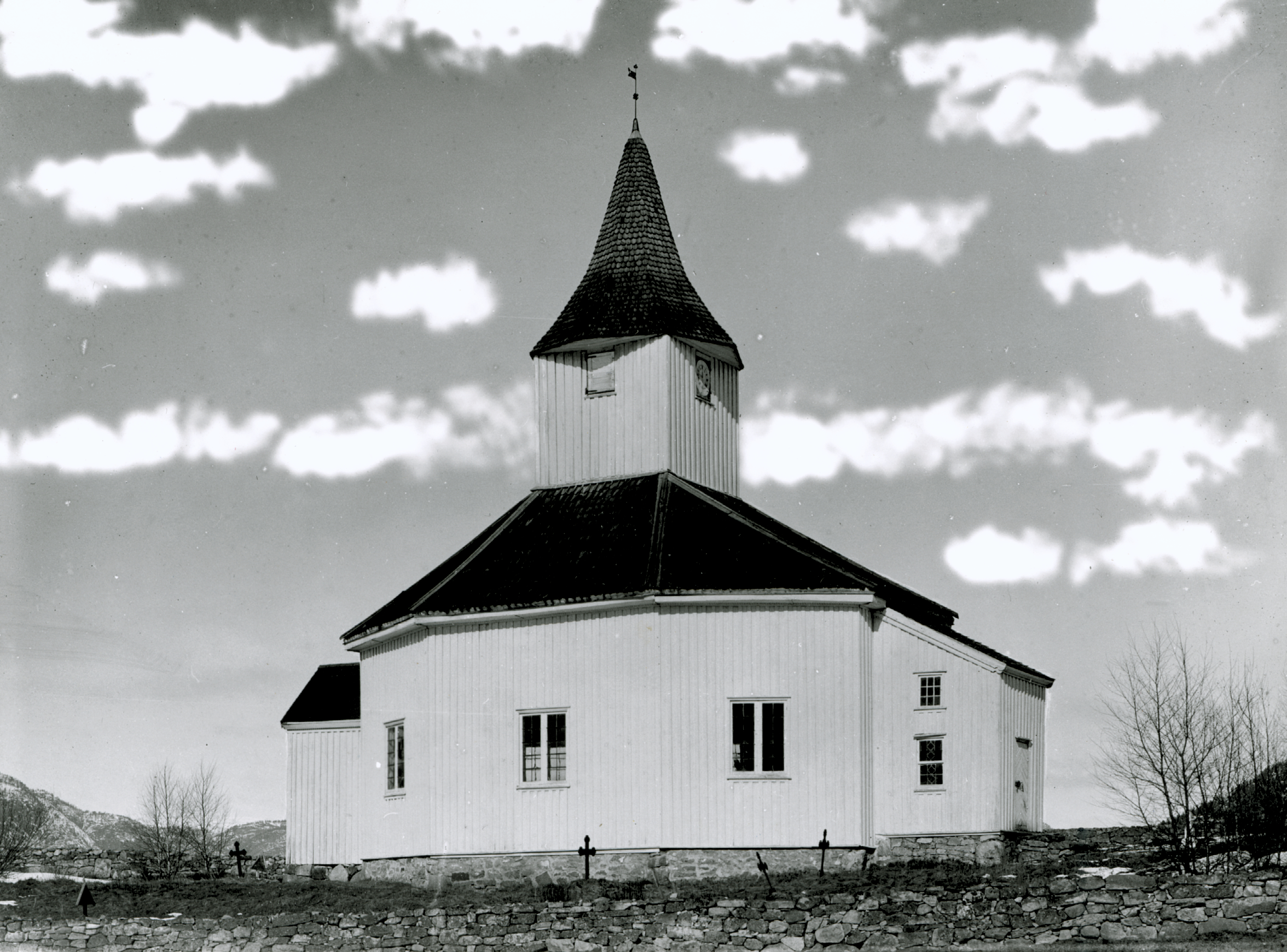

== See also ==
- List of churches in Agder og Telemark
