= Austad, Bygland =

Village in Bygland Municipality, Norway

Austad
- Village
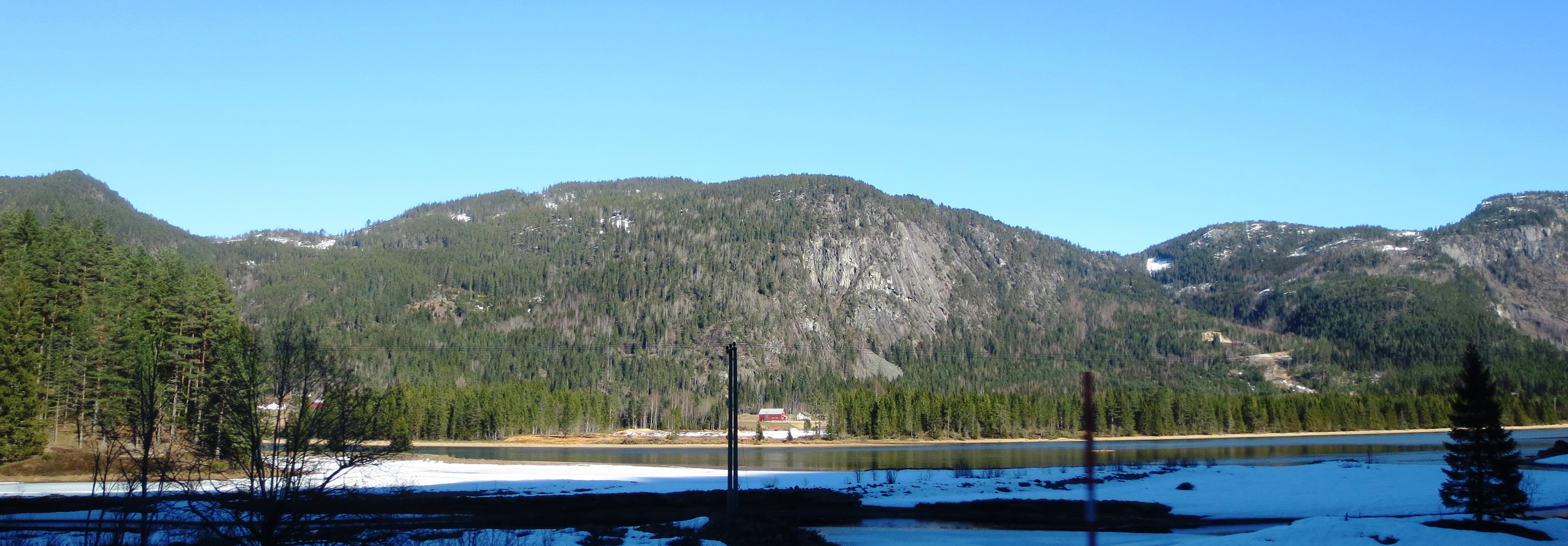
- View of the village, seen from across the river Otra
- Interactive map of Austad
- Coordinates: 58.9621°N 07.6791°E
- Country: Norway
- Region: Southern Norway
- County: Agder
- District: Setesdal
- Municipality: Bygland Municipality
- Elevation: 213 m (699 ft)
- Time zone: UTC+01:00 (CET)
  - Summer (DST): UTC+02:00 (CEST)
- Post Code: 4745 Bygland

Austad is a village in Bygland Municipality in Agder county, Norway. The village is located on the eastern shore of the river Otra, just north of the lake Åraksfjorden. The village of Ose lies just to the south, across the river. The area is flat, wedged between the river and the mountains to the east. The village area is mostly used as farmland.

Austad was the historic site of the Austad Church. The church stood here until about 1880 when it was torn down and replaced with a new church that was built in the nearby village of Tveit on the other side of the river and a little further west. The old cemetery is still located here.
