= Ose, Norway =

Village in Bygland Municipality, Norway

Ose
- Village
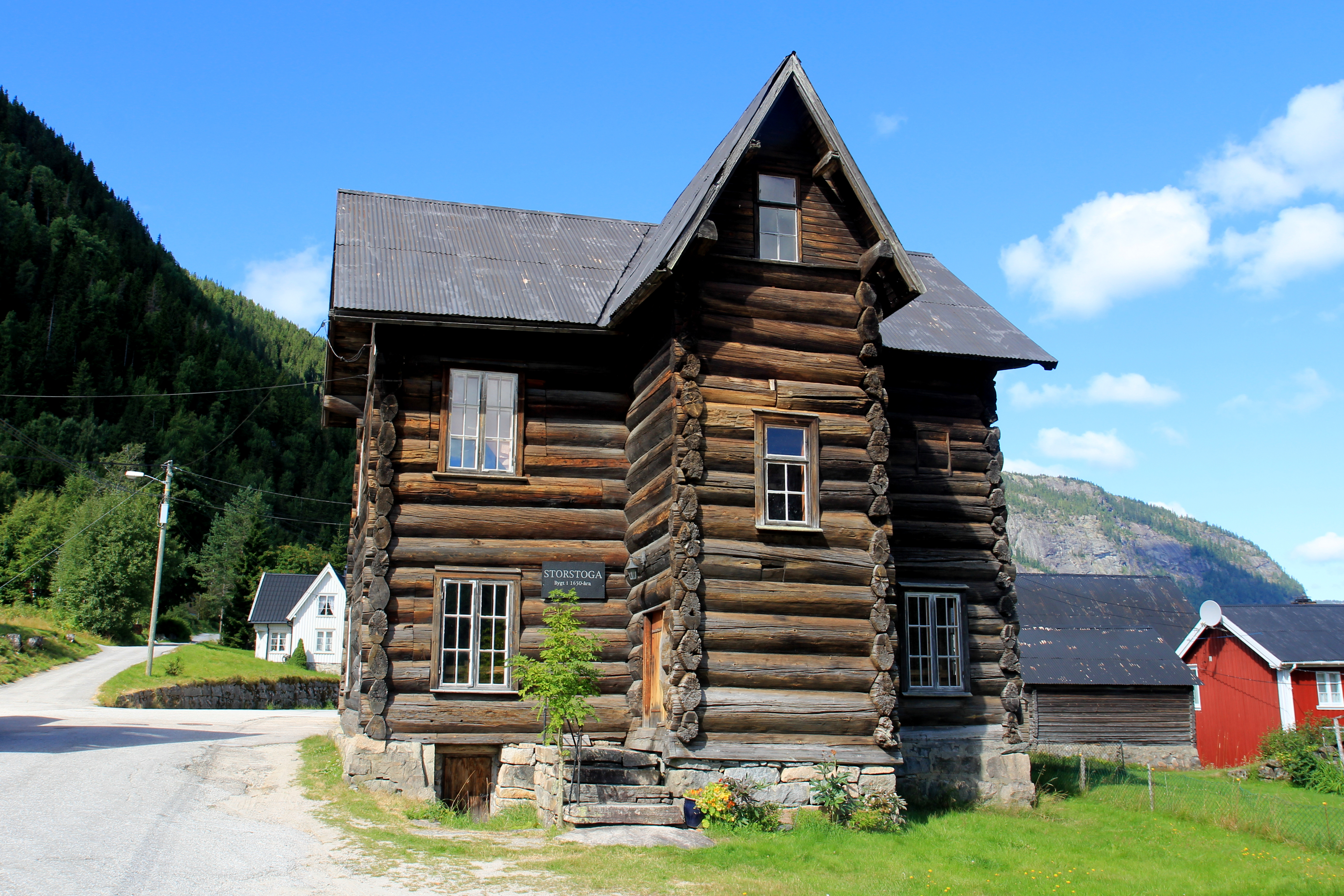
- View of the Storståga in Ose, the timber building is used for various exhibitions.
- Interactive map of Ose
- Coordinates: 58.9503°N 07.6798°E
- Country: Norway
- Region: Southern Norway
- County: Agder
- District: Setesdal
- Municipality: Bygland Municipality
- Elevation: 210 m (690 ft)
- Time zone: UTC+01:00 (CET)
  - Summer (DST): UTC+02:00 (CEST)
- Post Code: 4745 Bygland

Ose is a village in Bygland Municipality in Agder county, Norway. The village is located along the river Otra, just north of the lake Åraksfjorden. The Norwegian National Road 9 runs through the village. Just across the river to the north lies the village of Austad, and about 1.5 kilometres (0.93 mi) to the north along Highway 9 lies the village of Moi.

The Reiårsfossen waterfall lies about 1 kilometre (0.62 mi) to the south. The area just southeast of the waterfall is the site of Reiårsfossen Camping, which is also the location of the Ose Country Music festival. There is a traditionally-built log building in Ose called Storståga, which is used for various exhibitions.

The SS Bjoren is a wood-fuelled heritage steamboat that travels the route between Byglandsfjord-Bygland-Ose across the lake Byglandsfjorden and Åraksfjorden each summer.

== Media gallery ==
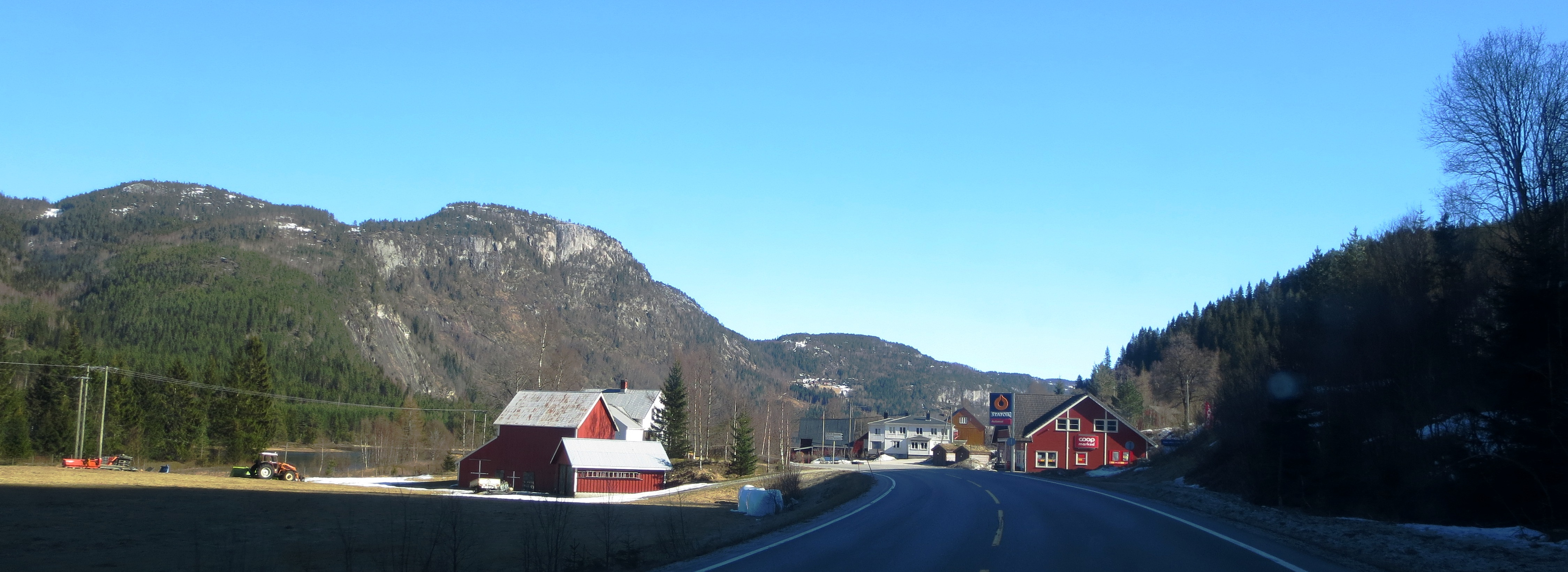
View of Ose village

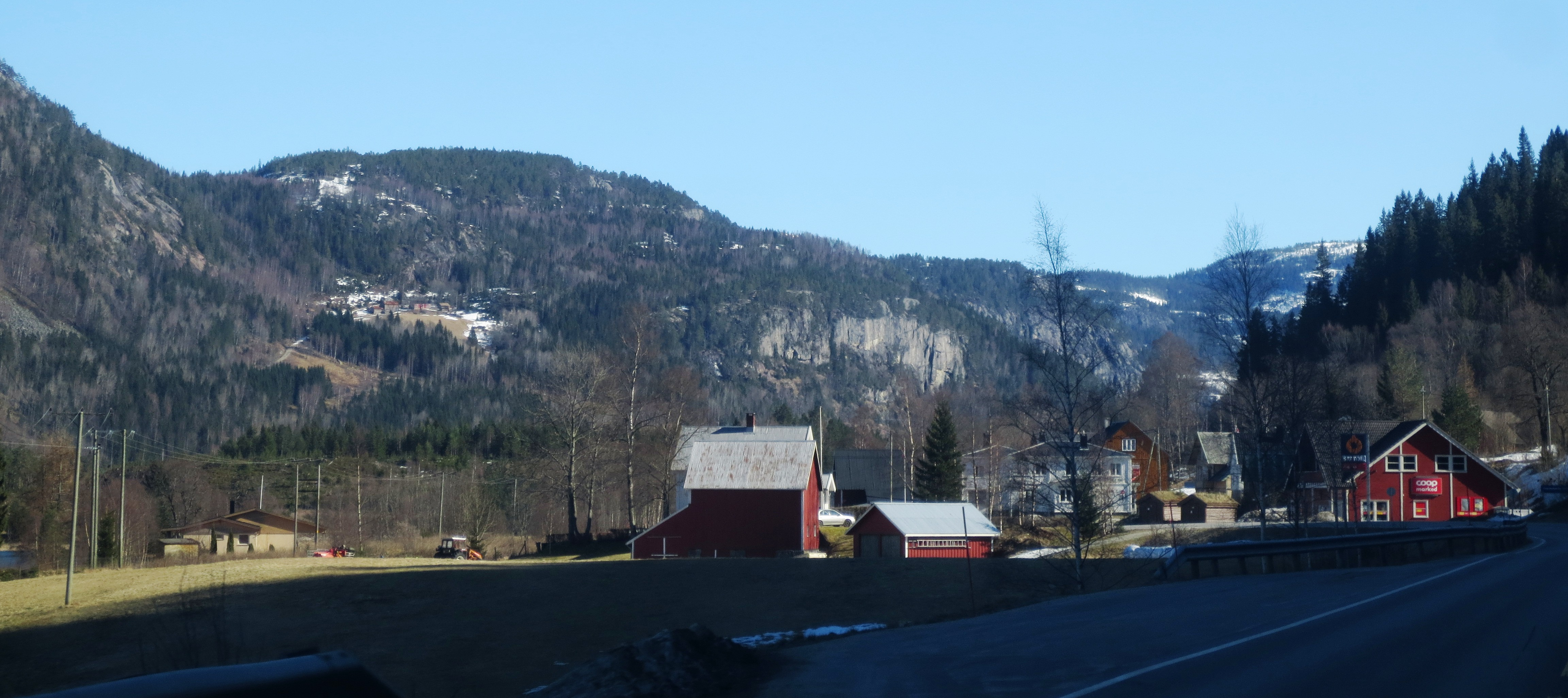
View of Ose village

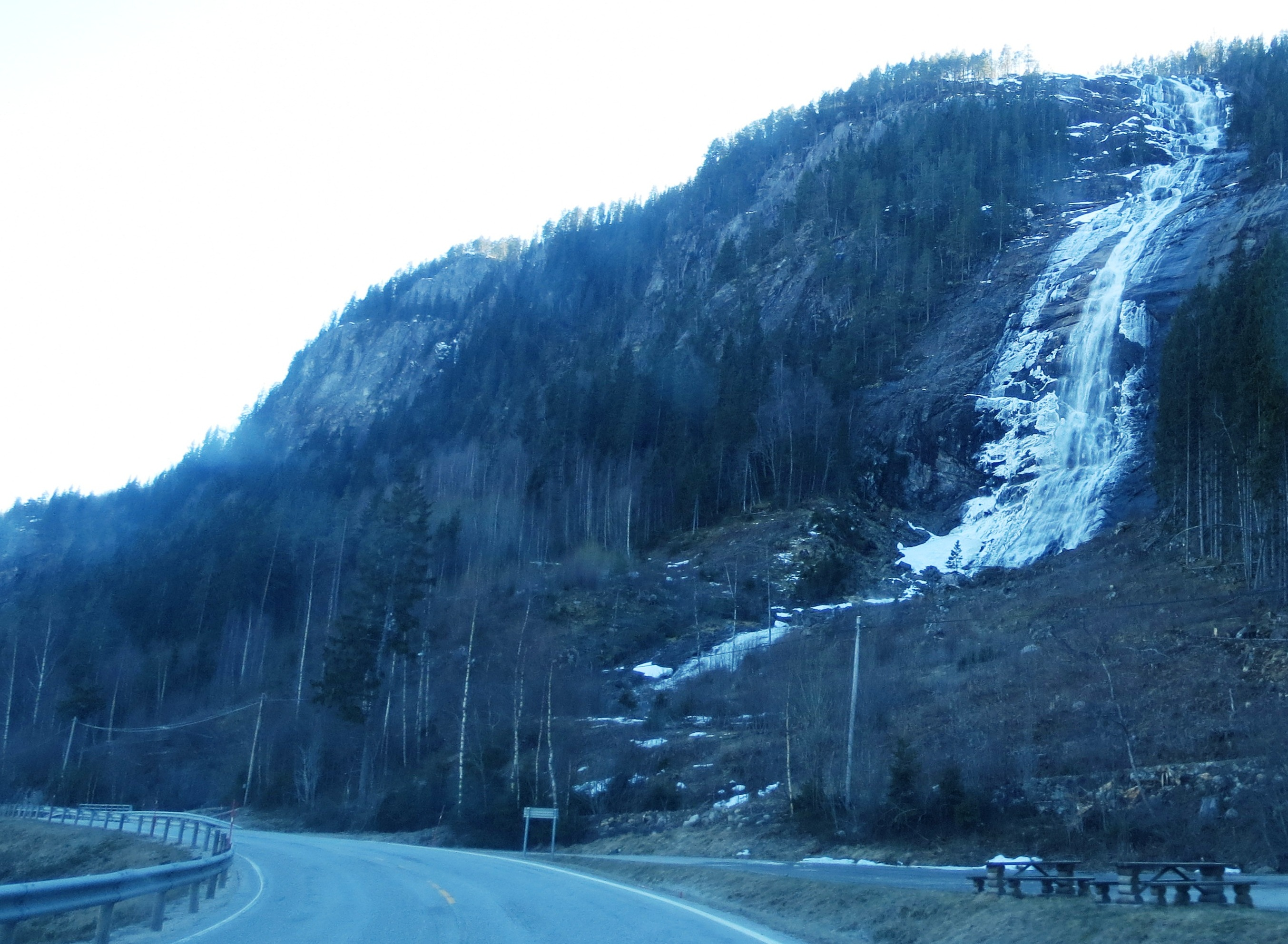
View of the nearby Reiårsfossen waterfall

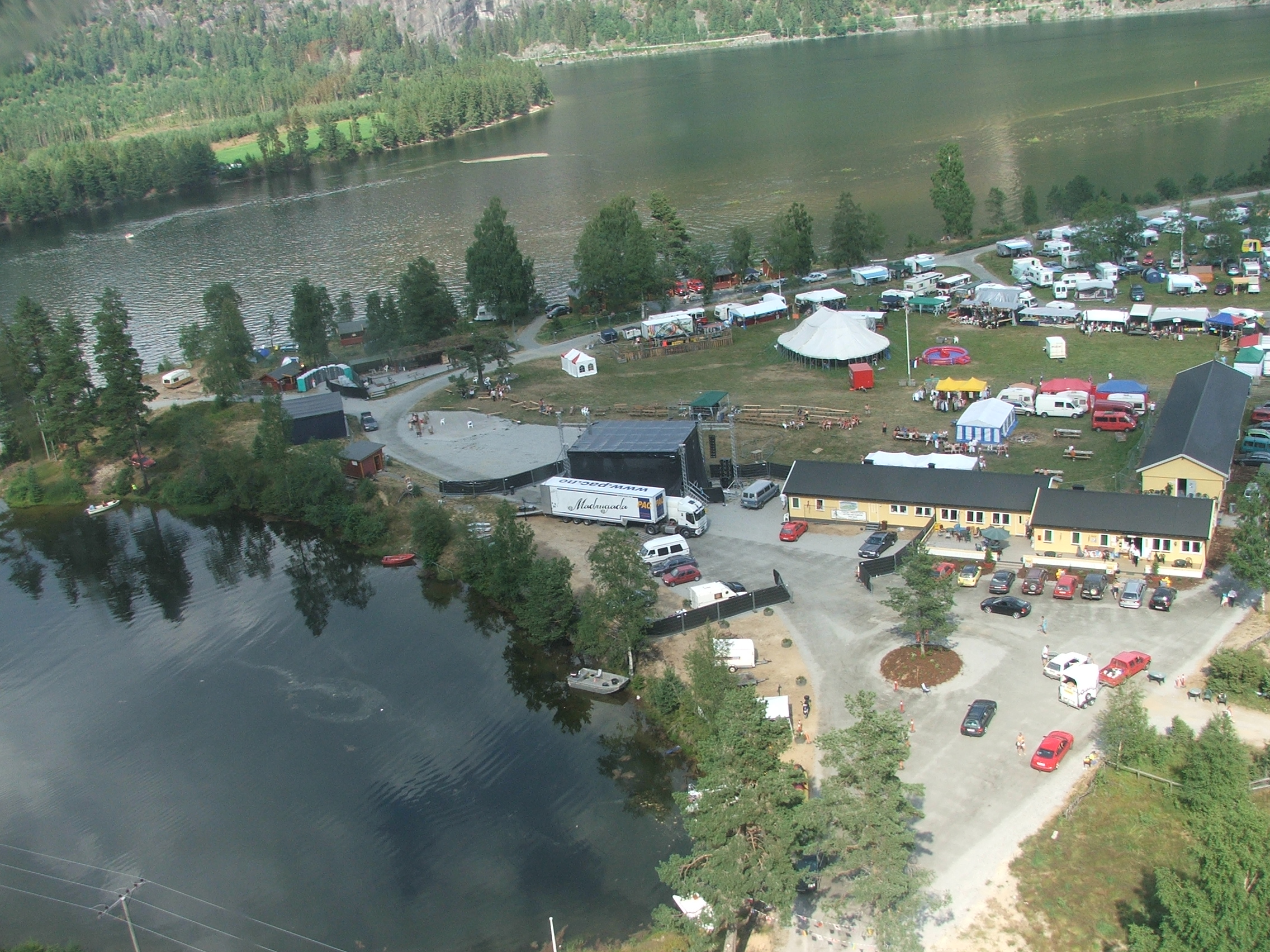
Ose Country Music Festival

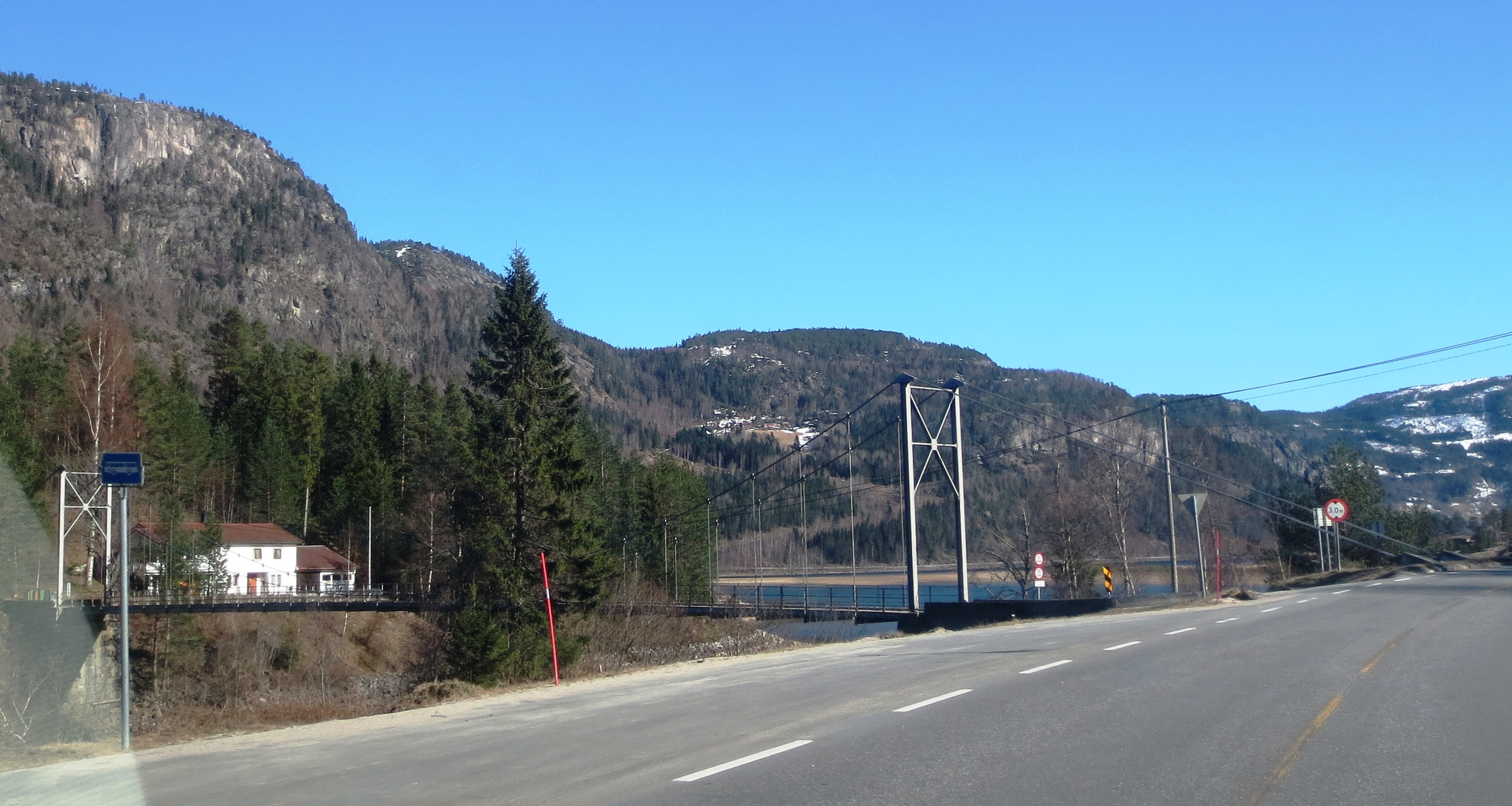
Ose bridge, just south of the village, crossing the river Otra
