= Austad Church (Bygland) =

Church in Agder, Norway

- Austad kyrkje
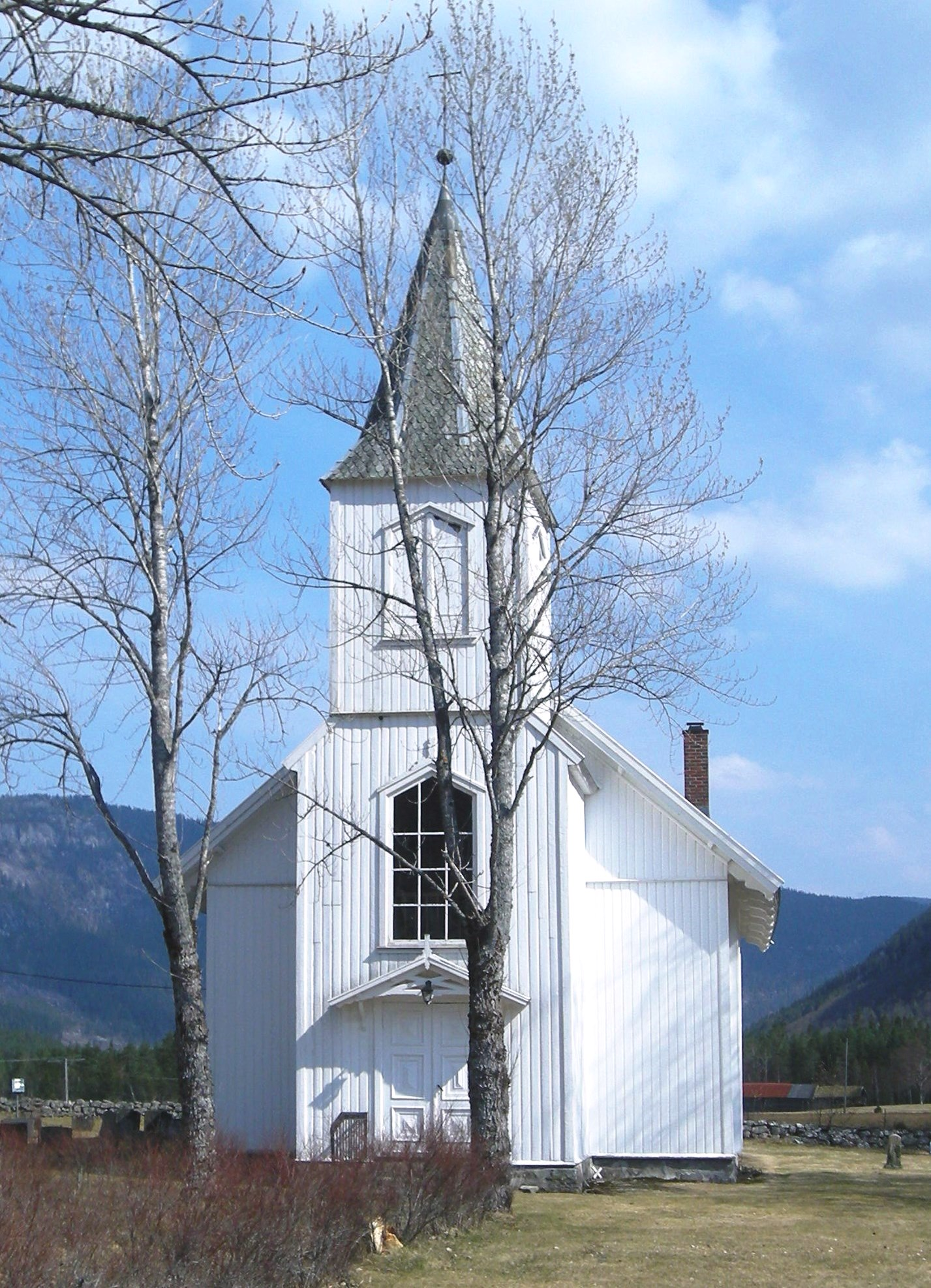
- View of the church
- Austad Church
- 58.98078°N 07.60794°E
- Location: Bygland Municipality, Agder
- Country: Norway
- Denomination: Church of Norway
- Previous denomination: Catholic Church
- Churchmanship: Evangelical Lutheran

History
- Status: Parish church
- Founded: c. 1200
- Consecrated: 7 July 1880

Architecture
- Functional status: Active
- Architect: Oskar Fabricius
- Architectural type: Long church
- Completed: 1880 (146 years ago)

Specifications
- Capacity: 250
- Materials: Wood

Administration
- Diocese: Agder og Telemark
- Deanery: Otredal prosti
- Parish: Bygland og Årdal
- Norwegian Cultural Heritage Site
- Type: Church
- Status: Not protected
- ID: 83821

Austad Church (Norwegian: Austad kyrkje) is a parish church of the Church of Norway in Bygland Municipality in Agder county, Norway. It is located in the village of Tveit on the south shore of the river Otra, just off the Norwegian National Road 9. It is one of the churches for the Bygland og Årdal parish which is part of the Otredal prosti (deanery) in the Diocese of Agder og Telemark. The white, wooden church was built in a long church design in 1880 using plans drawn up by the architect Oskar Fabricius who was from Kristiania. The church seats about 250 people.

== History ==
The earliest existing historical records of the church date back to the year 1328, but it was likely built around the year 1200. The original building was a stave church and it was located at Austad, about 5 kilometres (3.1 mi) to the southeast of the present church site (and on the other side of the river). After the Black Death, the church was without its own priest for many years (around 1350-1400). After that, it was an annex to the Bygland Church. In 1668, the old stave church was torn down and a small log church was built in its place on the same site.

In 1872, the old church was in very poor condition, so the parish began to look into its options. In 1878, the parish received permission to tear down and replace the old building. In 1880, a new church was built at Tveit, about 5 kilometres (3.1 mi) to the northwest and on the other side of the river from the old church site and when the new church was completed, the old church was torn down and the old materials were sold. The new church was consecrated on 7 July 1880 by the Bishop Jørgen Moe.

== Media gallery ==
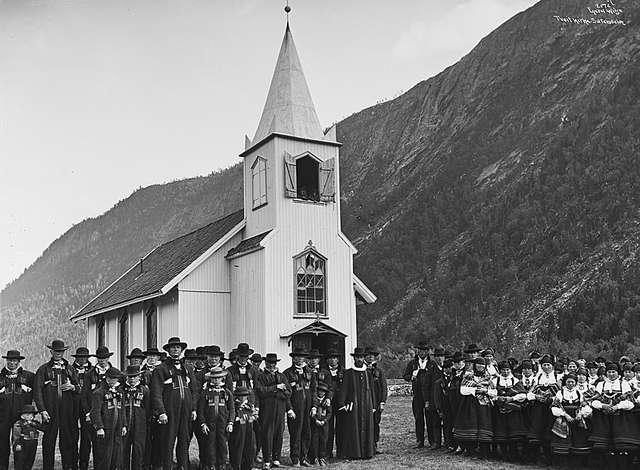
View of the church circa 1885.

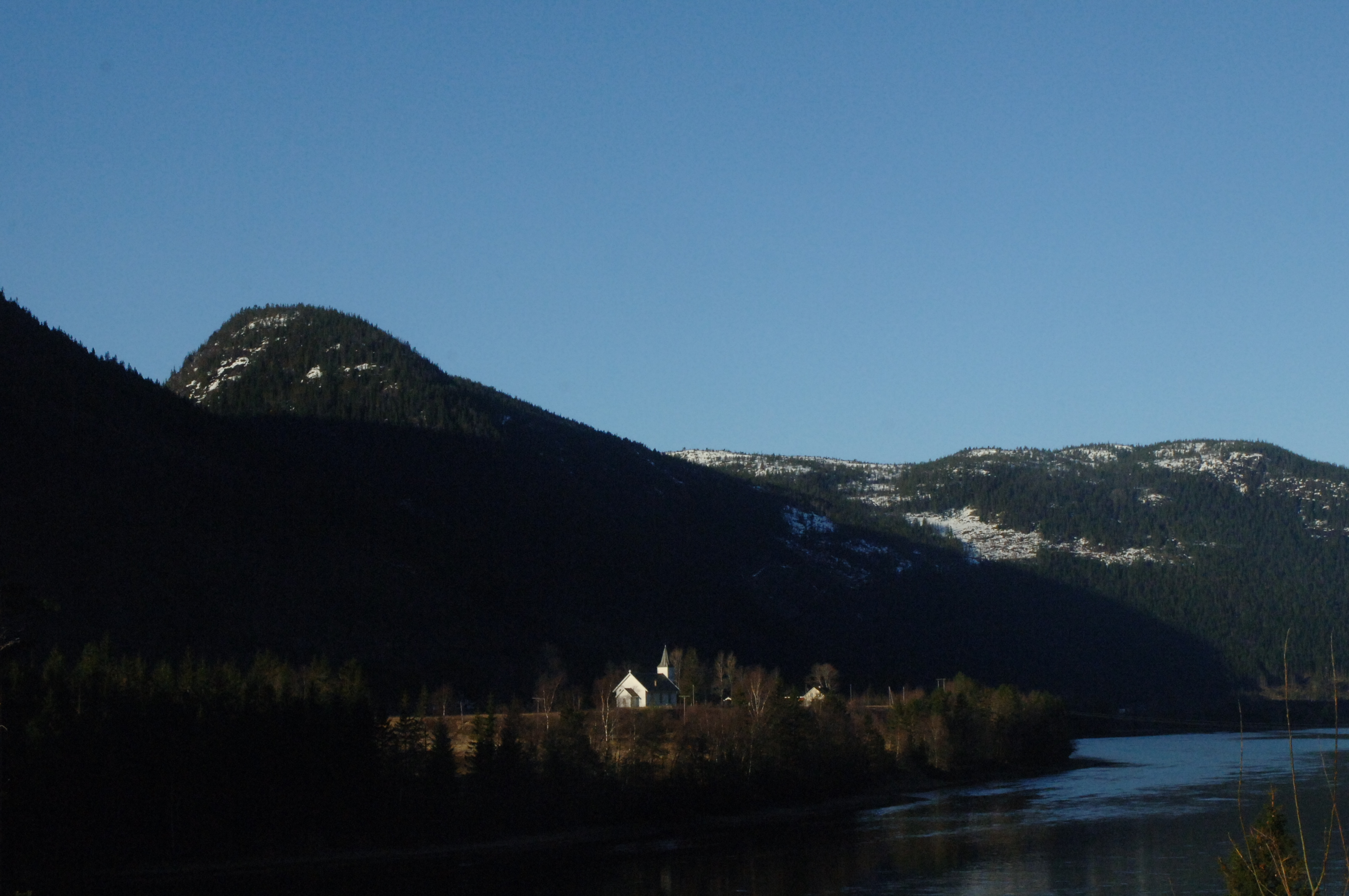
View of the church from a distance.

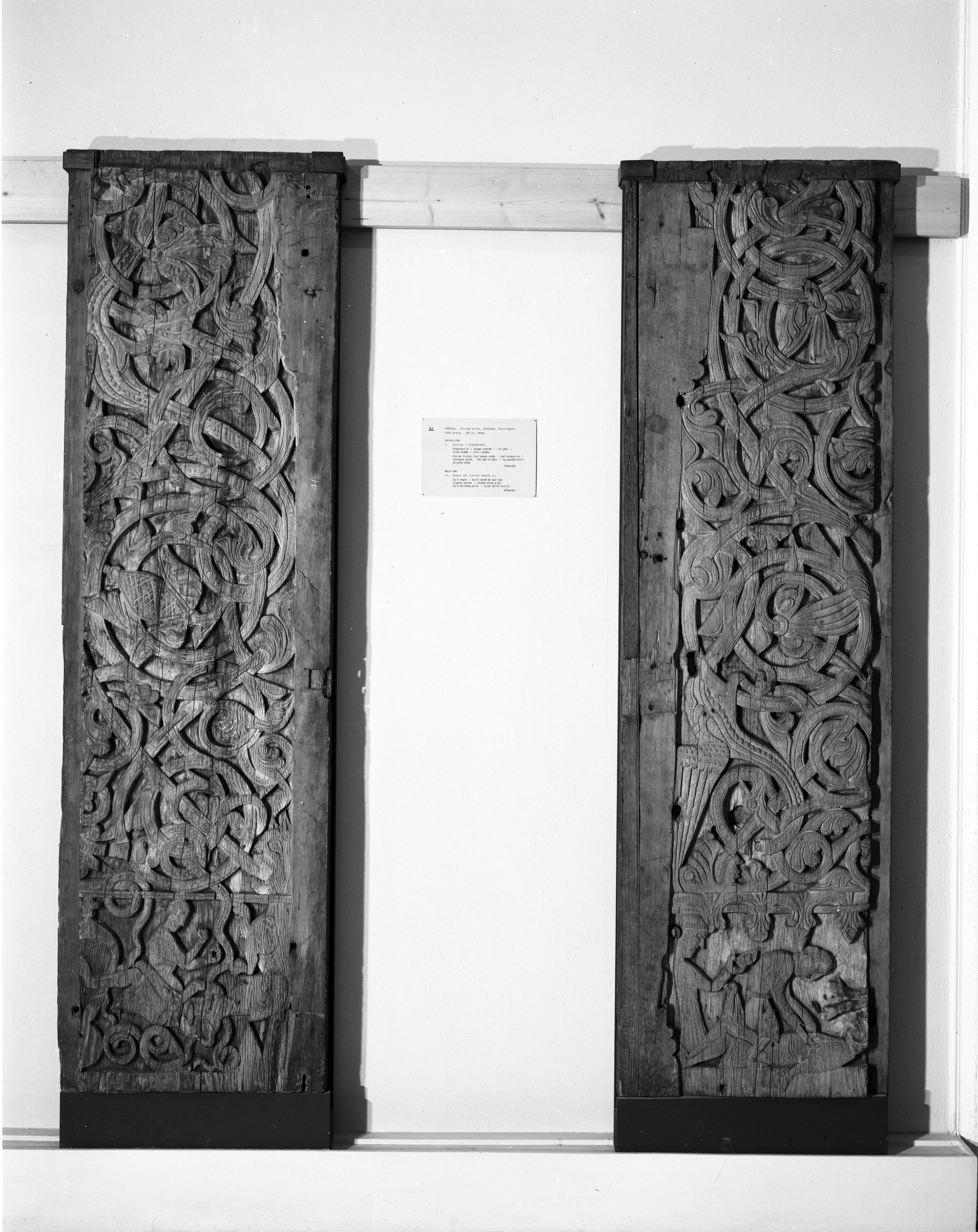
Carved designs from the old Austad stave church.

== See also ==
- List of churches in Agder og Telemark
