= Tveit, Bygland =

Village in Bygland Municipality, Norway

Tveit
- Village
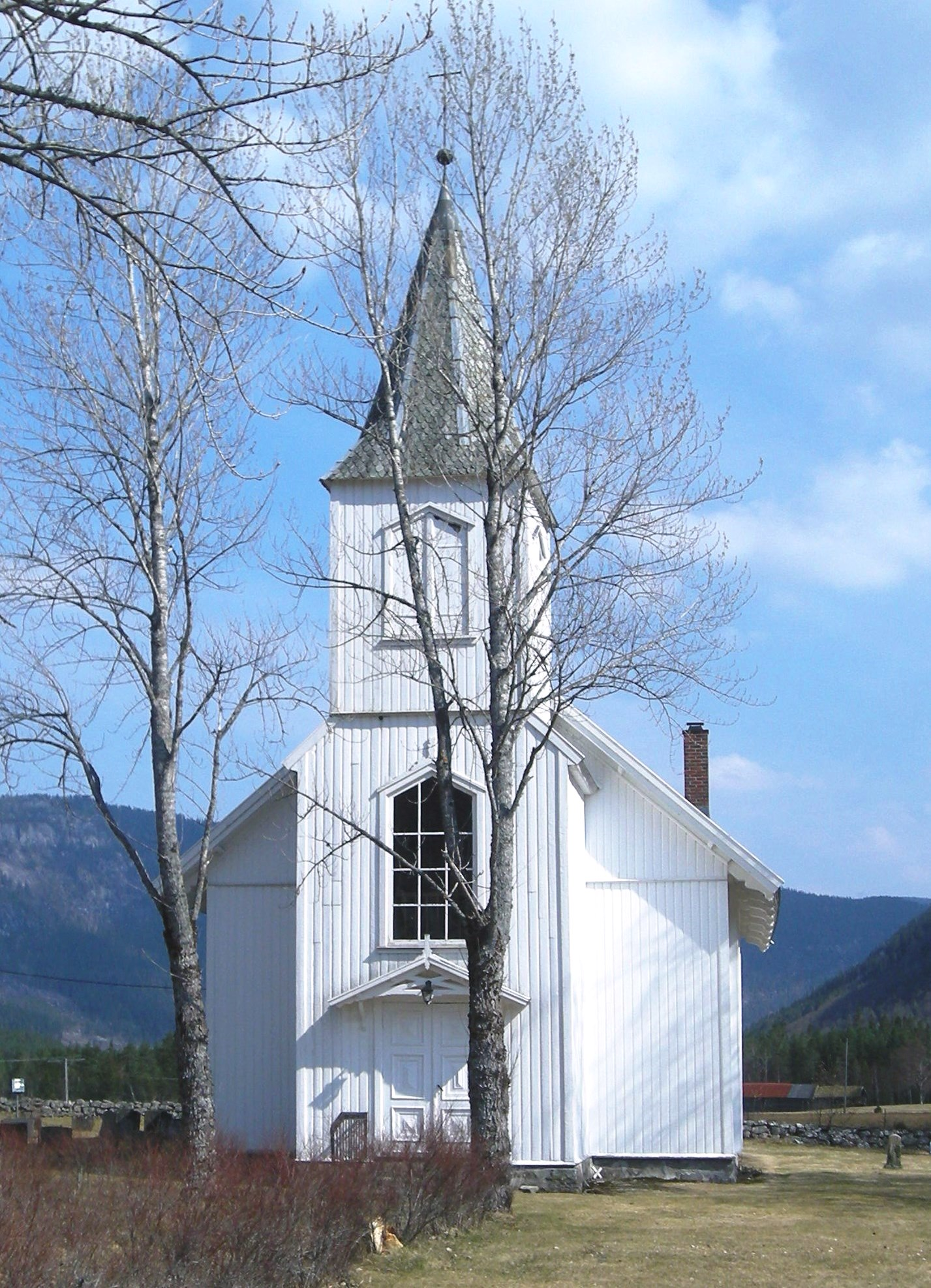
- View of the village church
- Interactive map of Tveit
- Coordinates: 58.9787°N 07.6069°E
- Country: Norway
- Region: Southern Norway
- County: Agder
- District: Setesdal
- Municipality: Bygland Municipality
- Elevation: 221 m (725 ft)
- Time zone: UTC+01:00 (CET)
  - Summer (DST): UTC+02:00 (CEST)
- Post Code: 4745 Bygland

Tveit is a village in Bygland Municipality in Agder county, Norway. The village is located on the south shore of the river Otra, about halfway between the villages of Langeid and Moi along the Norwegian National Road 9. The village is the present site of Austad Church which serves the northern part of the municipality. Prior to 1880, Austad Church was located in the nearby village of Austad on the other side of the river.
