= Langeid =

Village in Bygland Municipality, Norway

- Village
- Interactive map of Langeid
- Coordinates: 58.9892°N 07.5380°E
- Country: Norway
- Region: Southern Norway
- County: Agder
- District: Setesdal
- Municipality: Bygland Municipality
- Elevation: 223 m (732 ft)
- Time zone: UTC+01:00 (CET)
  - Summer (DST): UTC+02:00 (CEST)
- Post Code: 4745 Bygland

Langeid is a village in Bygland Municipality in Agder county, Norway. The village is located in the northern part of the municipality, along the river Otra and the Norwegian National Road 9, about halfway between the villages of Tveit (in Bygland Municipality) and Besteland (in neighboring Valle Municipality).

== Archaeology ==
In 2011, during road construction on Highway 9, an elaborately decorated Viking sword was excavated. The sword is decorated with gold-leaf and silver thread. The weapon appears to feature both ancient runic symbols as well as Latin characters and Christian symbols. Archaeologists have yet to decipher the meaning of the mixed characters. The sword was found buried next to a battle axe and several ancient silver coins.

The sword likely belonged to a wealthy Viking who was both a farmer and a warrior who sailed to the British Isles with King Cnut the Great. The finding prompted further archaeological study in Langeid, as it may have been a wealthy Viking-era town involved in ironwork weapons production.
