= Lauvdal =

Village in Bygland Municipality, Norway

- Village
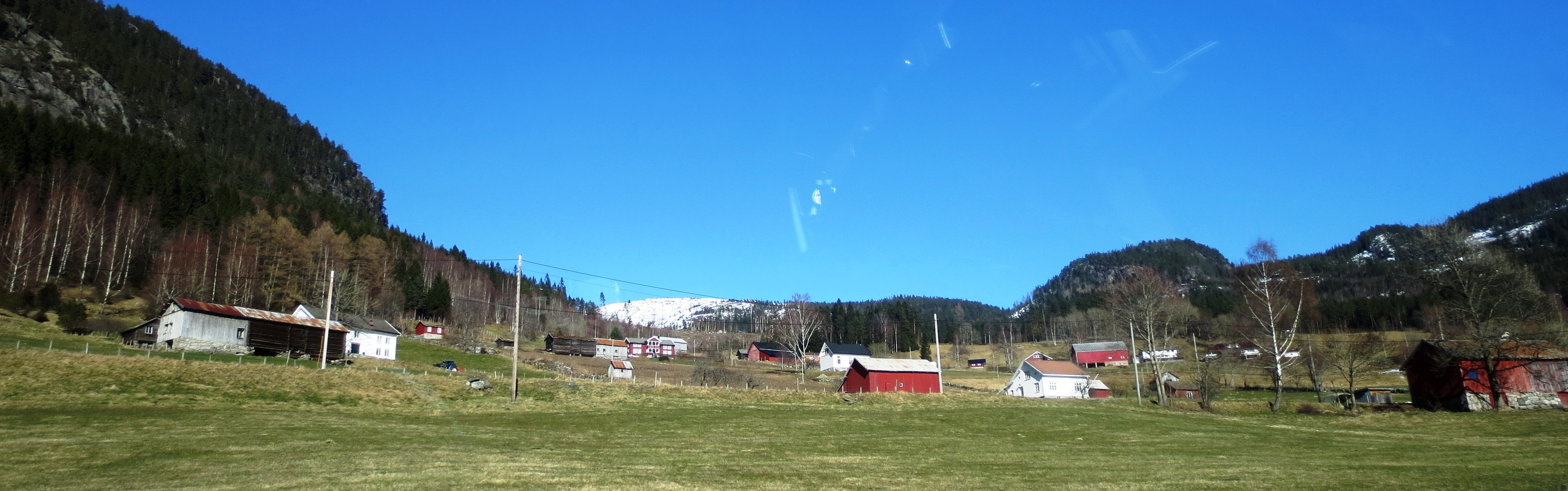
- View of the village
- Interactive map of Lauvdal
- Coordinates: 58.7944°N 07.8189°E
- Country: Norway
- Region: Southern Norway
- County: Agder
- District: Setesdal
- Municipality: Bygland Municipality
- Elevation: 214 m (702 ft)
- Time zone: UTC+01:00 (CET)
  - Summer (DST): UTC+02:00 (CEST)
- Post Code: 4745 Bygland

Lauvdal is a village in Bygland Municipality in Agder county, Norway. It's located along the Norwegian National Road 9 on the east side of Byglandsfjorden. The village lies about 6 kilometres (3.7 mi) south of the village of Bygland and about the same distance north of the village of Longerak. The population (2001) was 41 residents. The lake Longerakvatnet is located about 6 kilometres (3.7 mi) southeast of the village.

The area has yielded numerous historical artifacts, including a silver-tipped spear now exhibited at a museum in Oslo. Lauvdal was once known for substantial cow and pig farming, but today features only two farms.

== Attractions ==
The Hagen crofter's cottage is located in the north part of Lauvdal. This was occupied until the 1960s and has stood unused since then. It is now part of the Setesdal Museum collection.
