= Hallvard Sandnes =

Norwegian schoolteacher and writer

- Born: 27 March 1893; Bygland, Aust-Agder, Norway
- Died: 25 July 1968 (aged 75); Stavanger, Norway
- Occupations: School teacher, writer

Hallvard Sandnes (27 March 1893 – 25 July 1968) was a Norwegian schoolteacher and writer.

He was born in the village of Sandnes in Bygland Municipality in Aust-Agder county, Norway. He studied education at Voss Folk High School (Voss Folkehøgskule) and at Kristiansand Teacher Training College (Kristiansand lærerskole) with Vetle Vislie (1858–1933) as an instructor. From 1915 he was a teacher at Høydal in Volda Municipality. From 1919, he taught in Stavanger, including from 1921 to 1960 at Kvalberg School in Hetland Municipality. During the last ten years, he served as principal.

Sandnes made his literary debut in 1913. Among his books are Fjellkongen from 1924, Skjoldmøyane from 1926, and Norigards-Ram'n from 1928. In the 1940s, he created the science fiction comics series Ingeniør Knut Berg, along with Jostein Øvrelid (1910-1983).

He was awarded the Melsom Prize (Melsom-prisen) in 1925. Sandnes died during 1968 and was buried in the cemetery at Hinna Church in Stavanger.
