= Reiårsfossen =

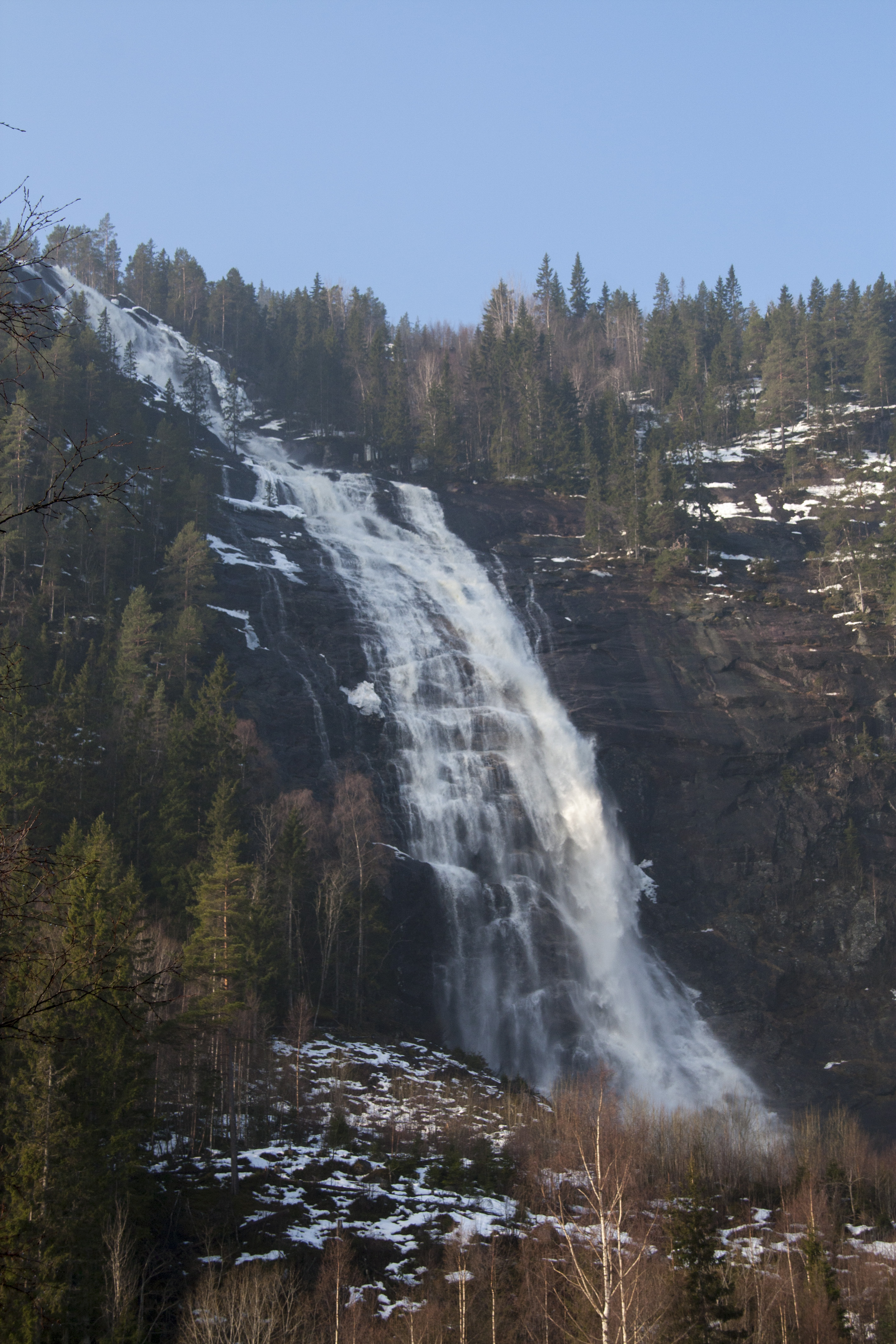
- View of the Reiårsfossen waterfall
- Interactive map of Reiårsfossen
- Location: Bygland Municipality, Norway
- Coordinates: 58.9397819°N 7.6852113°E
- Type: Horsetail
- Elevation: 356 metres (1,168 ft)
- Total height: 230 metres (750 ft)
- Number of drops: 3
- Longest drop: 130 metres (430 ft)

Reiårsfossen is a 230-metre (750 ft) tall waterfall in Setesdal, Norway. The waterfall is located along the Norwegian National Road 9, just south of the village of Ose in Bygland Municipality in Agder county. The waterfall flows down into a short stream before emptying into the northern end of the Åraksfjorden. The area, which contains several of creeks and rivers, was protected by law in 1973.

== Legend ==
Reiårsfossen got its name because one of the workmen's sons, Reiår (old spelling for Reidar), had fallen in love with a farm girl in Ose. To have her, the farmer had the condition that he should ride over the top of the falls three times. He did this, but the legend goes on to say that he wanted to take one more trip over the falls in honor of his upcoming wedding. This (fourth) trip, however, had fatal consequences, and both the horse and Reiår fell down and died.

== Tourism ==
The waterfall has become a tourist attraction and there is a public campground, Camp Reiårsfossen, just to the east on the shores of the Åraksfjorden. This campground holds annual festivals and events such as the Ose Country Festival (country music) and also a fishing festival.

There is a full-year toll road to the top of the falls and further inland to the lake Reiårsvann.

== See also ==
- List of waterfalls
