= Moi, Bygland =

Village in Bygland Municipality, Norway

Moi
- Village
- Interactive map of Moi
- Coordinates: 58.9630°N 07.6665°E
- Country: Norway
- Region: Southern Norway
- County: Agder
- District: Setesdal
- Municipality: Bygland Municipality
- Elevation: 213 m (699 ft)
- Time zone: UTC+01:00 (CET)
  - Summer (DST): UTC+02:00 (CEST)
- Post Code: 4745 Bygland

Moi is a village in Bygland Municipality in Agder county, Norway. The village is located on the west shore of the river Otra, about 1.5 kilometres (0.93 mi) north of the village of Ose and about 5 kilometres (3.1 mi) southeast of the village of Tveit, along the Norwegian National Road 9.
