= Bygland Church =

Church in Agder, Norway

- Bygland kyrkje
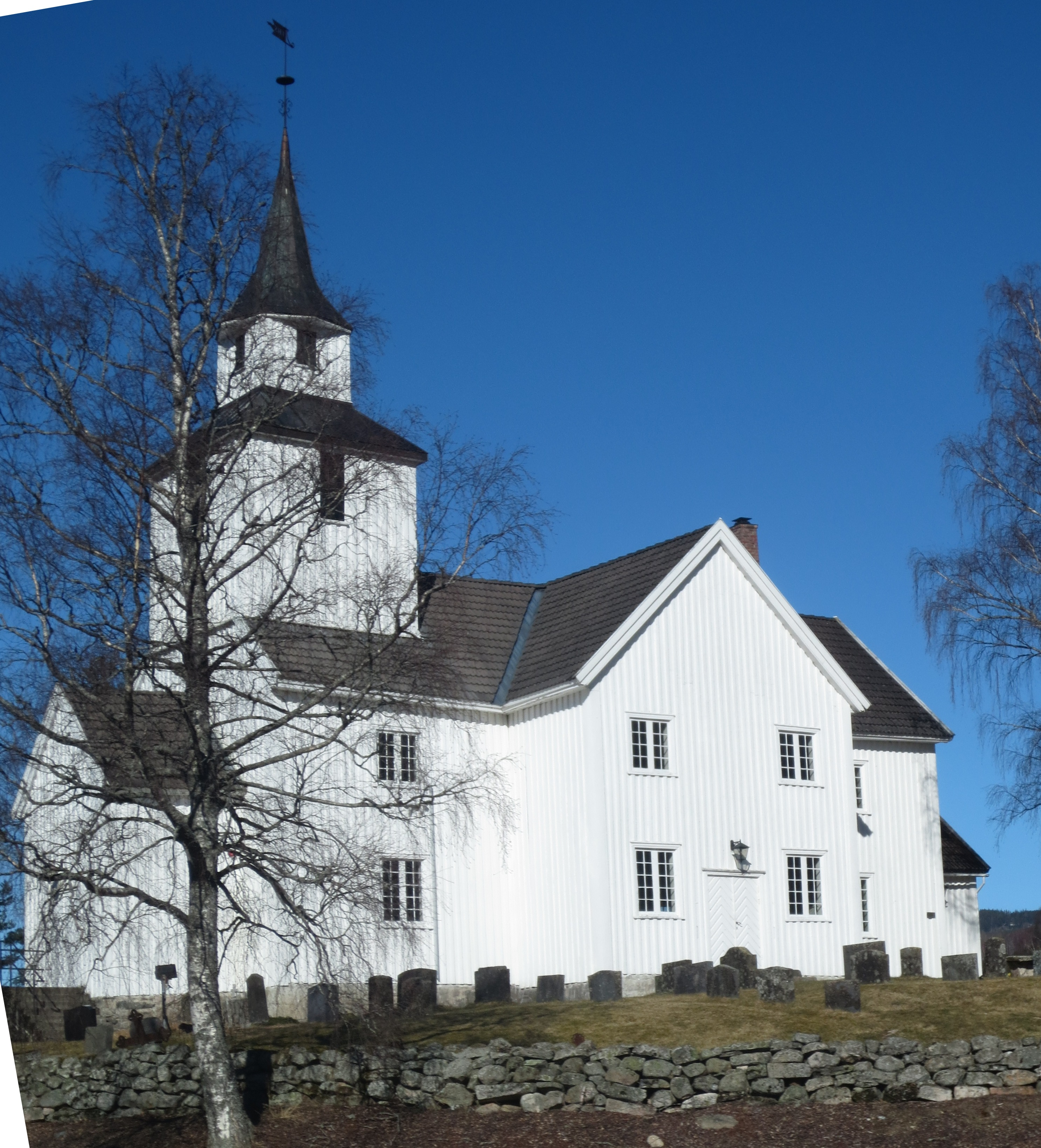
- View of the church
- Bygland Church
- 58.8305°N 07.7958°E
- Location: Bygland Municipality, Agder
- Country: Norway
- Denomination: Church of Norway
- Previous denomination: Catholic Church
- Churchmanship: Evangelical Lutheran

History
- Status: Parish church
- Founded: 13th century
- Consecrated: 18 Nov 1838

Architecture
- Functional status: Active
- Architect: Hans Linstow
- Architectural type: Cruciform
- Completed: 1838 (188 years ago)

Specifications
- Capacity: 250
- Materials: Wood

Administration
- Diocese: Agder og Telemark
- Deanery: Otredal prosti
- Parish: Bygland og Årdal
- Norwegian Cultural Heritage Site
- Type: Church
- Status: Automatically protected
- ID: 83977

Bygland Church (Norwegian: Bygland kyrkje) is a parish church of the Church of Norway in Bygland Municipality in Agder county, Norway. It is located in the village of Bygland on the eastern shore of the Byglandsfjorden, just alongside the Norwegian National Road 9. It is one of the churches for the Bygland og Årdal parish which is part of the Otredal prosti (deanery) in the Diocese of Agder og Telemark. The white, wooden church was built in a cruciform design in 1838 by the builder Anders Thorsen Syrtveit who used plans drawn up by the famous architect Hans Linstow. The church seats about 250 people.

== History ==
The earliest existing historical records of the church date back to the year 1316, but the church was not new that year. In 1669, the old stave church was torn down and replaced with a new building. Not much is known about that building.

In 1814, this church served as an election church (Norwegian: valgkirke). Together with more than 300 other parish churches across Norway, it was a polling station for elections to the 1814 Norwegian Constituent Assembly which wrote the Constitution of Norway. This was Norway's first national elections. Each church parish was a constituency that elected people called "electors" who later met together in each county to elect the representatives for the assembly that was to meet at Eidsvoll Manor later that year.

In 1838, the church building was torn down and a new cruciform building was constructed on the same site. The new church was consecrated on 18 November 1838 by the local provost, Ole Berg, from Evje Church.

== Media gallery ==
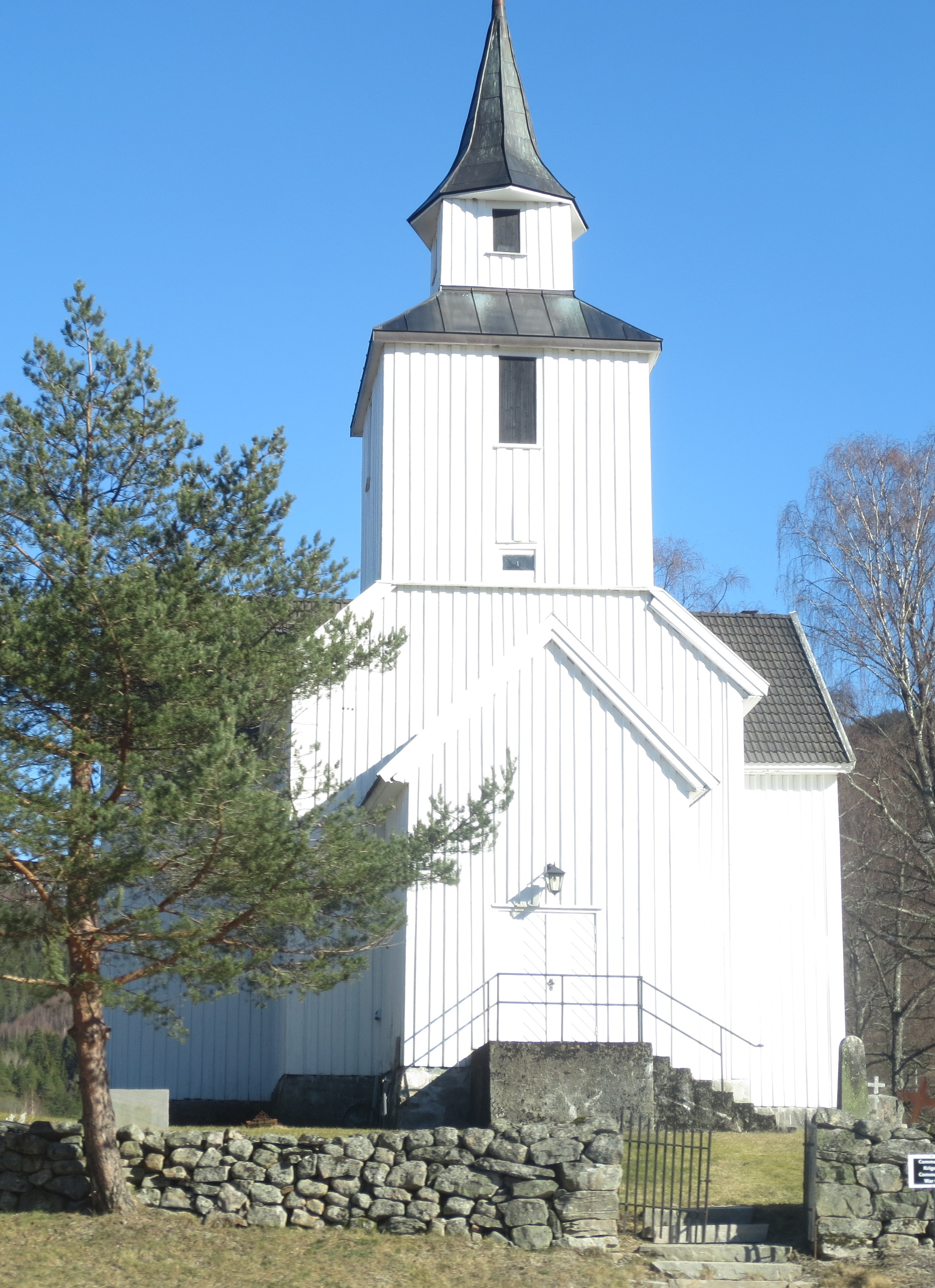

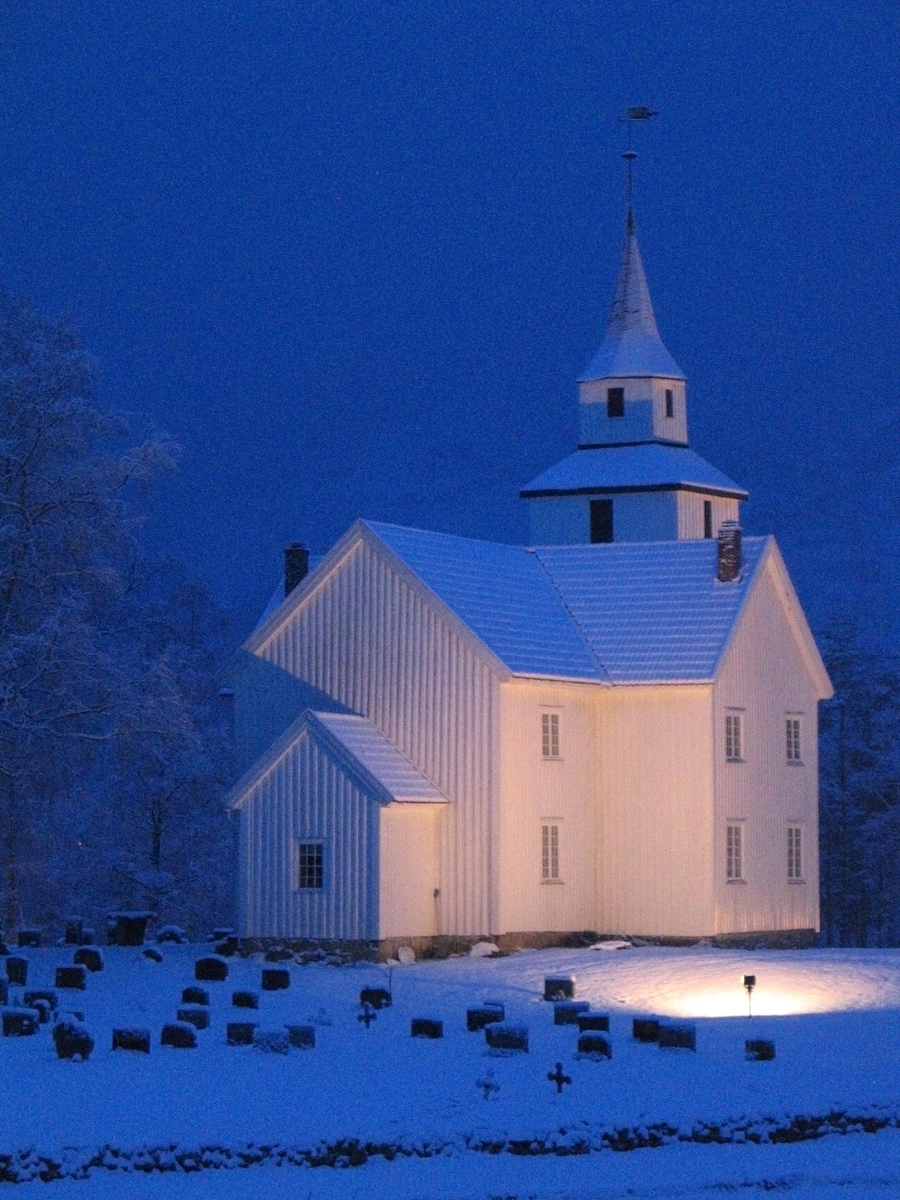

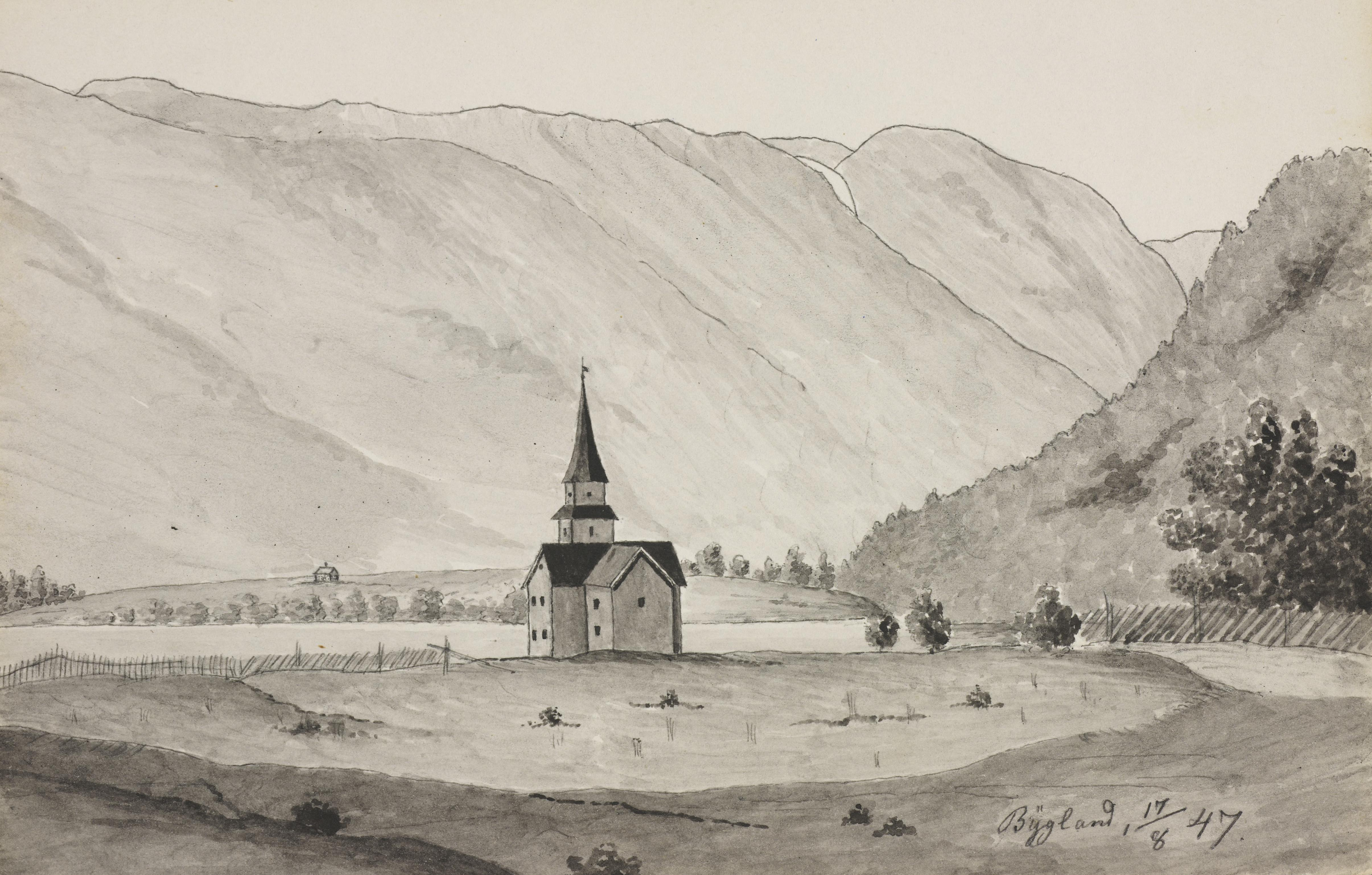

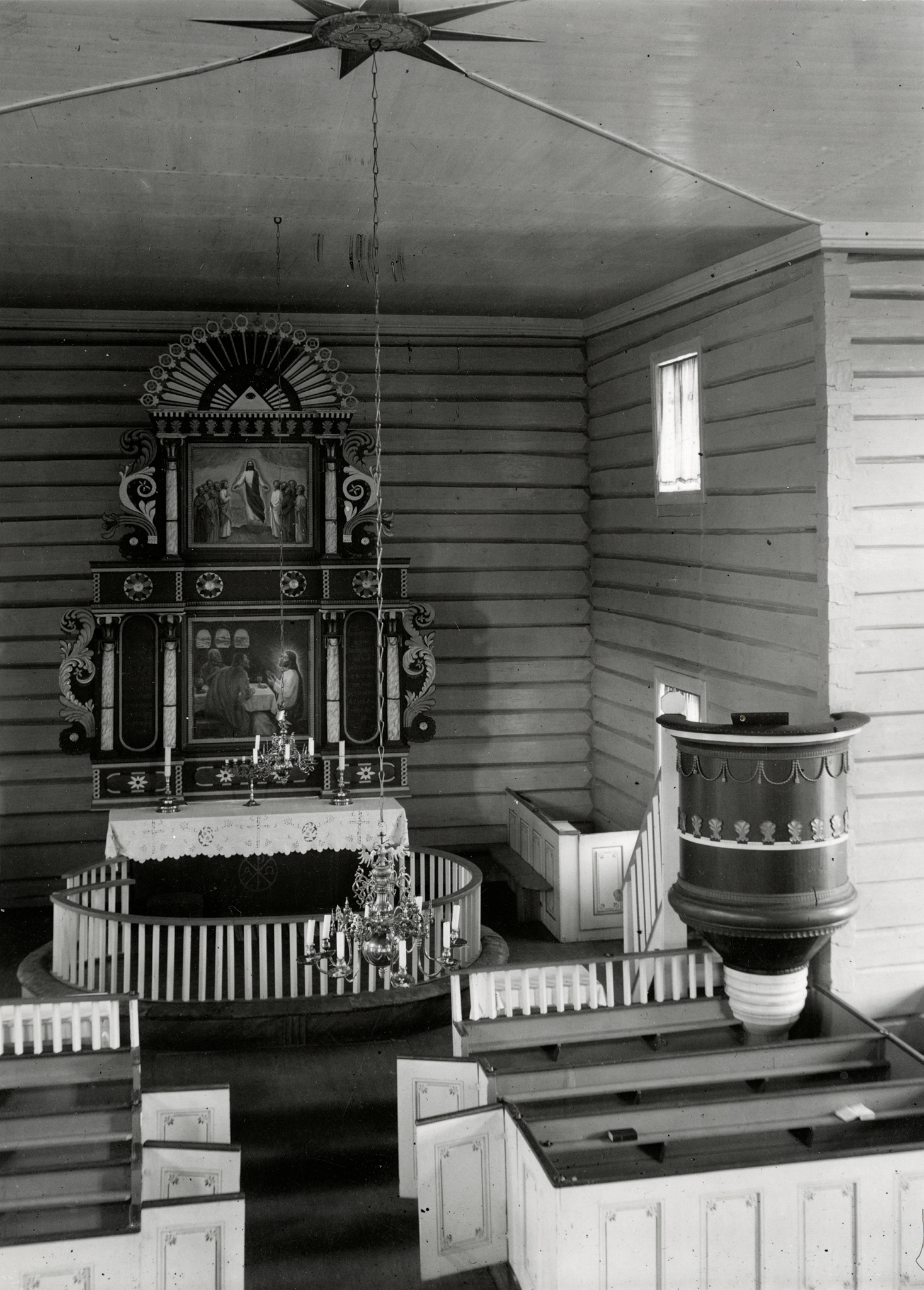

== See also ==
- List of churches in Agder og Telemark
