= Bygland Municipality =

Municipality in Agder, Norway

Bygland Municipality Bygland kommune
- Municipality
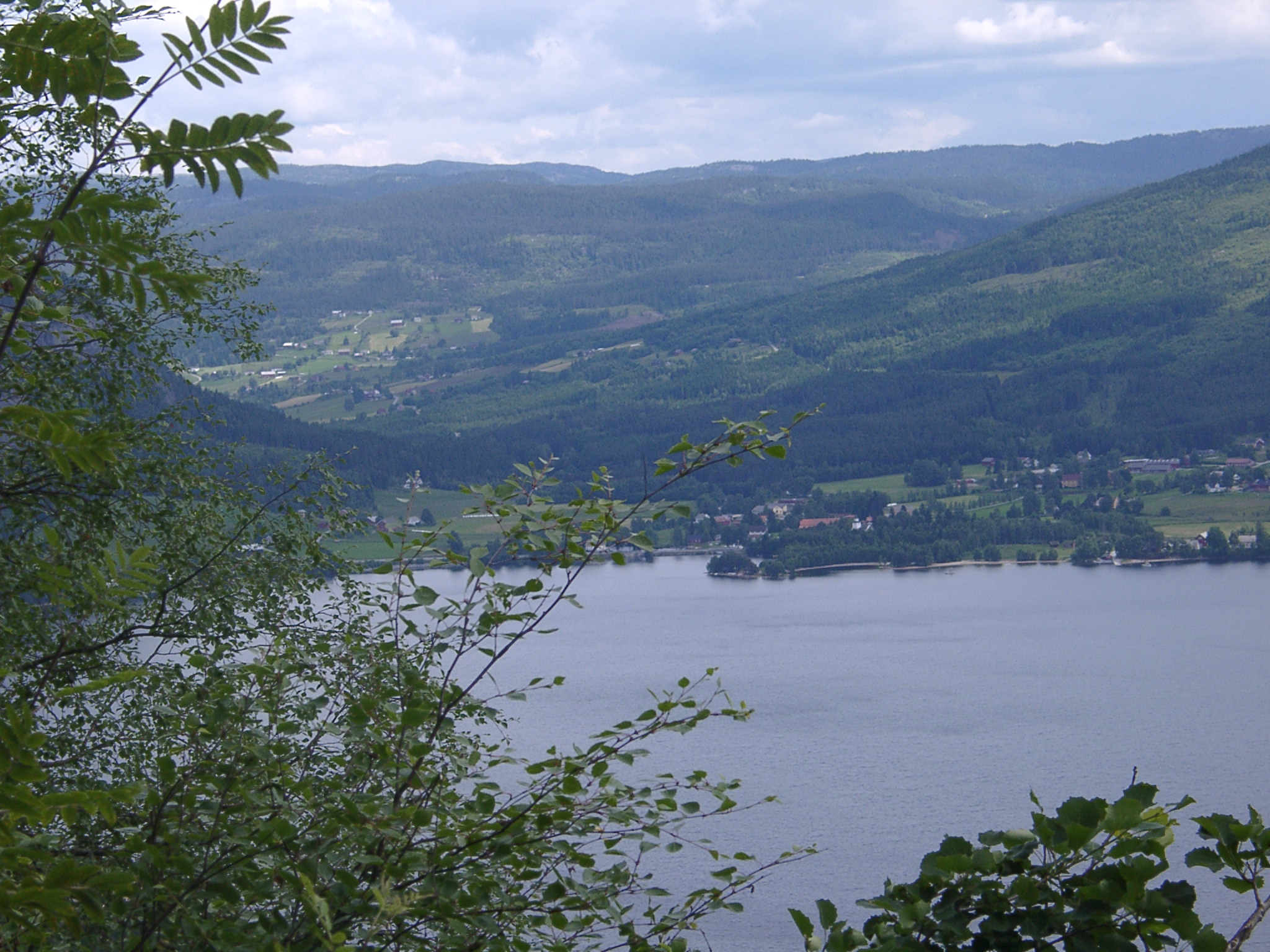
- View of Bygland

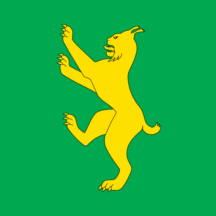
- Flag Coat of arms

- Agder within Norway

- Bygland within Agder
- Coordinates: 58°55′27″N 07°45′53″E
- Country: Norway
- County: Agder
- District: Setesdal
- Established: 1 Jan 1838
  - Created as: Formannskapsdistrikt
- Administrative centre: Bygland

Government
  - Mayor (2023): Runar Flåt Granheim (Ap)

Area
  - Total: 1,311.74 km^{2} (506.47 sq mi)
  - Land: 1,150.35 km^{2} (444.15 sq mi)
  - Water: 161.39 km^{2} (62.31 sq mi) 12.3%
  - Rank: #76 in Norway
- Highest elevation: 1,161.82 m (3,811.7 ft)

Population (2026)
  - Total: 1,167
  - Rank: #323 in Norway
  - Density: 1/km^{2} (2.6/sq mi)
  - Change (10 years): ▼ −3.1%
- Demonym: Byglending

Official language
  - Norwegian form: Nynorsk
- Time zone: UTC+01:00 (CET)
  - Summer (DST): UTC+02:00 (CEST)
- ISO 3166 code: NO-4220
- Website: Official website

Bygland is a municipality in Agder county, Norway. It is located in the traditional district of Setesdal. The administrative centre of the municipality is the village of Bygland. Other villages in the municipality include Åraksbø, Austad, Byglandsfjord, Grendi, Langeid, Lauvdal, Litveit, Longerak, Moi, Ose, Sandnes, Skåmedal, and Tveit. The Norwegian National Road 9 runs through the municipality, following the river Otra where most of the population of Bygland lives.

The 1,311.74-square-kilometre (506.47 sq mi) municipality is the 76th largest by area out of the 357 municipalities in Norway. Bygland Municipality is the 323rd most populous municipality in Norway with a population of 1,167. The municipality's population density is 1 inhabitant per square kilometre (2.6/sq mi) and its population has decreased by 3.1% over the previous 10-year period.

== General information ==
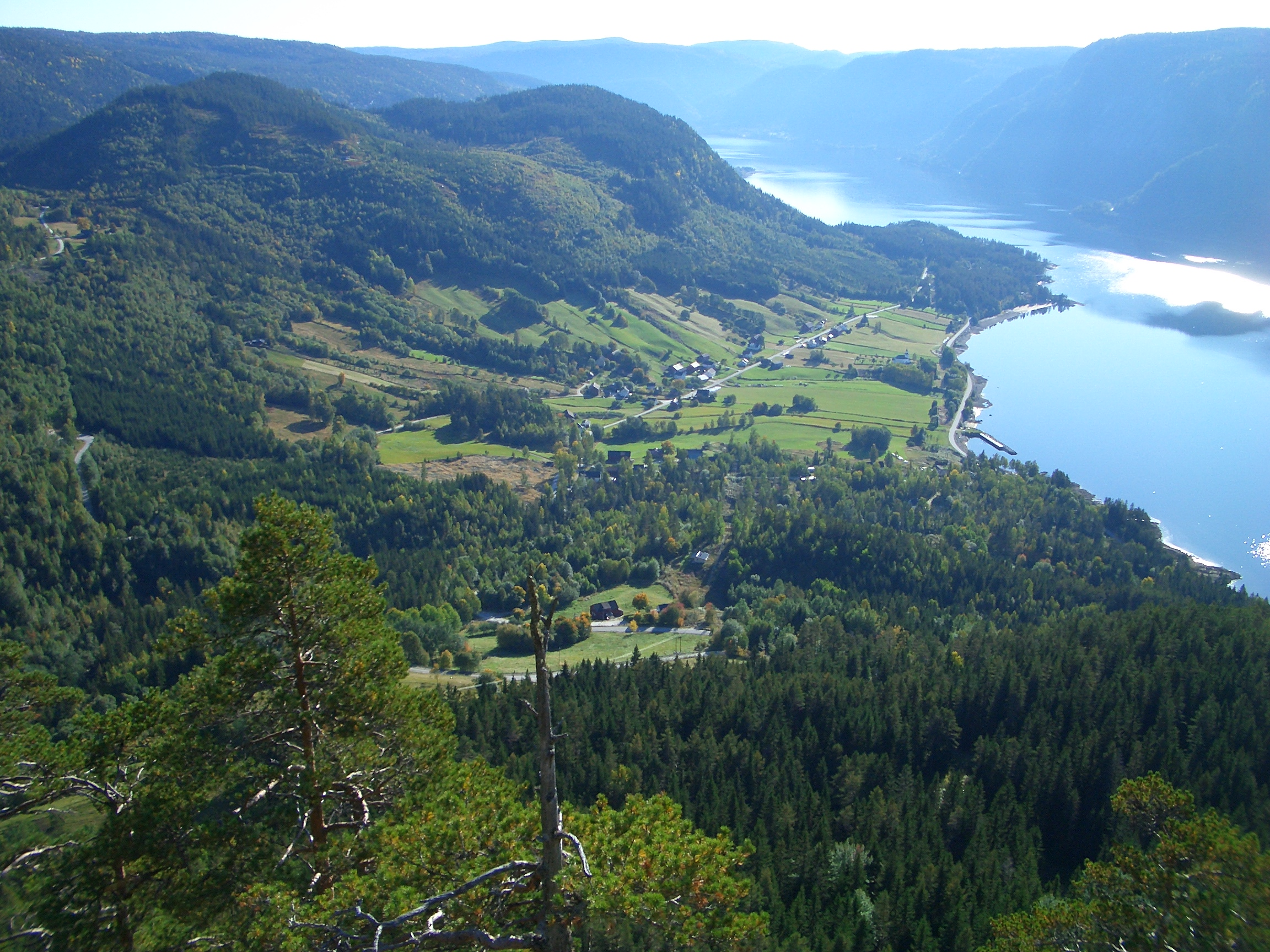
View of Åraksbø

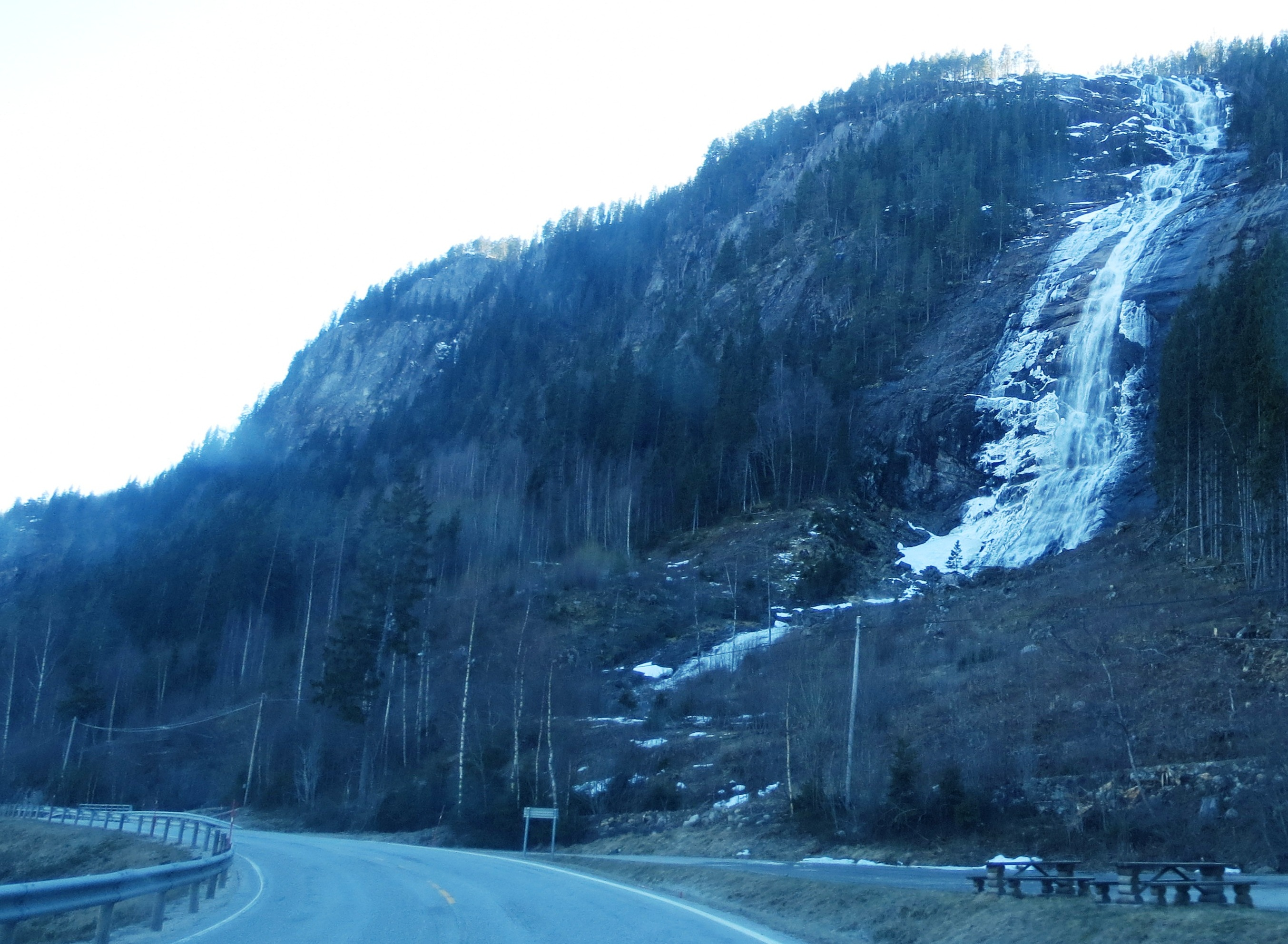
View of the Reiårsfossen waterfall

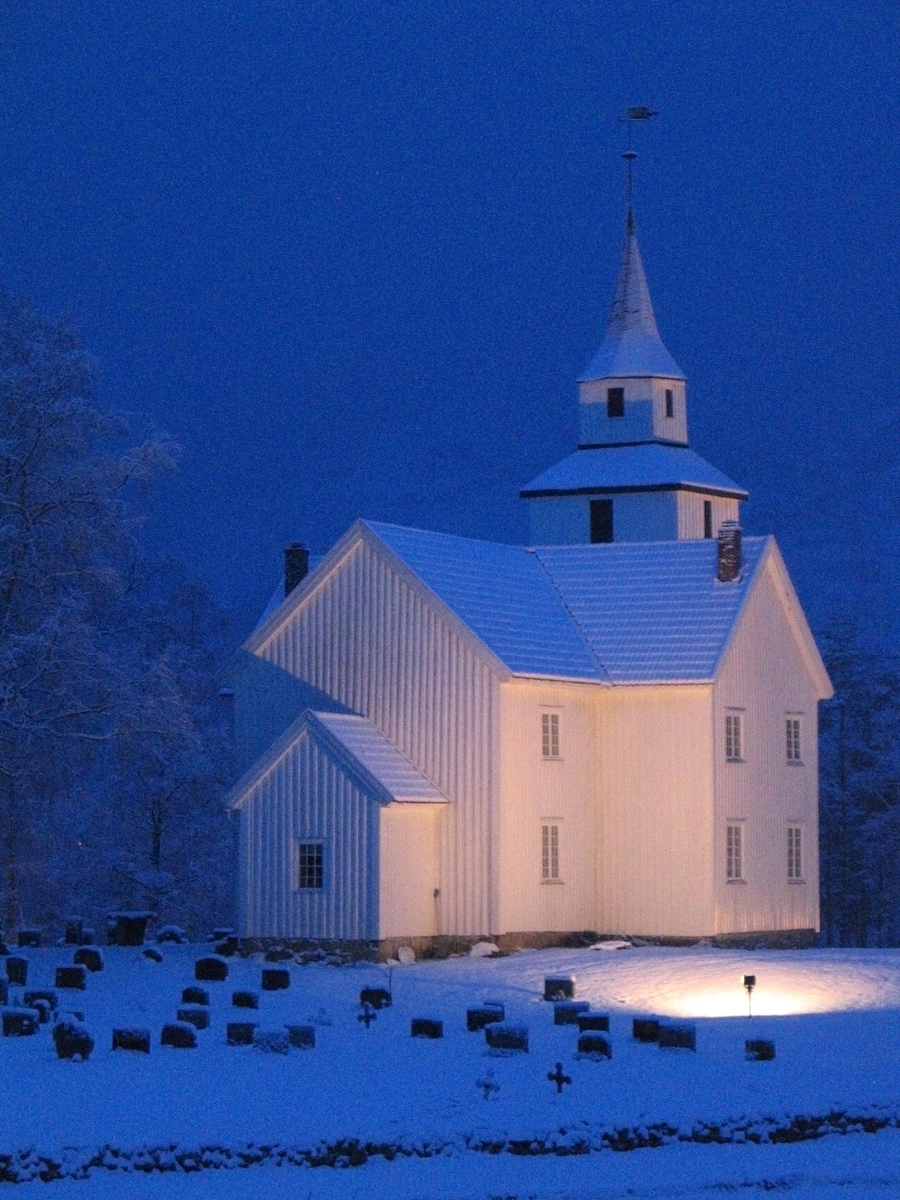
View of Bygland Church

=== Administrative history ===
The parish of Bygland was established as a municipality on 1 January 1838 (see formannskapsdistrikt law). Since that time, the municipal boundaries have not changed.

In 2020, there were many municipal and county mergers across Norway due to the work of the Solberg cabinet. Historically, this municipality was part of the old Aust-Agder county. On 1 January 2020, the municipality became a part of the newly-formed Agder county (after Aust-Agder and Vest-Agder counties were merged).

=== Name ===
The municipality (originally the parish) is named after the old Bygland farm (Old Norse: Byggland) since the first Bygland Church was built there. The first element is bygg which means "barley". The last element is land which means "land" or "farm".

=== Coat of arms ===
The coat of arms was granted on 15 November 1991. The official blazon is "Vert, a lynx rampant Or langued gules and the tips of ears and tail sable" (Norwegian: På grøn grunn ei oppspringande gull gaupe). This means the arms have a green field (background) and the charge is a European lynx (Lynx lynx) with a red tongue and with the tips of ears and tail being black. The lynx has a tincture of Or which means it is commonly colored yellow, but if it is made out of metal, then gold is used. The green color in the field symbolizes the importance of the agriculture and forests in the municipality. The lynx was chosen to symbolize the wild and rich nature in the rural highlands of the municipality. The arms were designed by Daniel Rike. The municipal flag has the same design as the coat of arms.

=== Churches ===
The Church of Norway has two parishes (sokn) within Bygland Municipality. It is part of the Otredal prosti (deanery) in the Diocese of Agder og Telemark.

Churches in Bygland Municipality
Parish (sokn)	Church name	Location of the church	Year built
Bygland	Austad Church	Tveit	1880
Bygland	Bygland Church	Bygland	1838
Bygland	Sandnes Church	Åraksbø	1844
Årdal	Årdal Church	Grendi	1828

== Geography ==
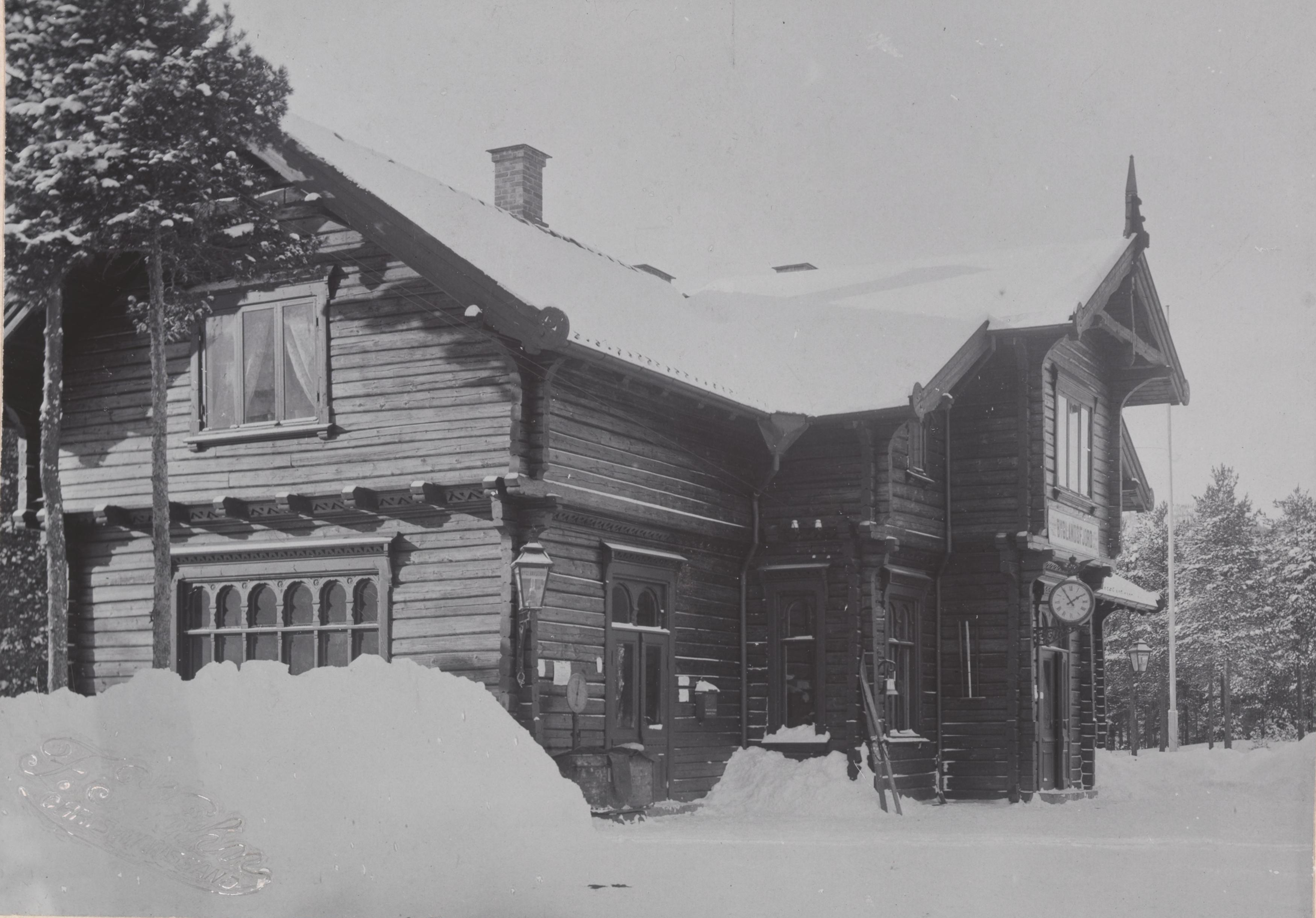
View of a railway station along the Setesdal Line

Bygland Municipality lies in the middle of the Setesdal valley which is also a traditional district in Agder county. The valley includes the municipalities of Bykle, Valle, Bygland, Iveland, and Evje og Hornnes. The Otra river flows from the glacially scoured Hardangervidda plateau in the north, through the Setesdal valley (and through Bygland), and into the sea near the city of Kristiansand. The municipality is bordered on the north by Valle Municipality; in the east by Fyresdal Municipality (in Telemark county) and Åmli Municipality (in Agder county); in the south by Froland Municipality and Evje og Hornnes Municipality; and in the west by Åseral Municipality, Kvinesdal Municipality, and Sirdal Municipality.

Bygland Municipality is Agder's third largest municipality in area. The majority of the area of the municipality lies in the Setesdalsheiene mountains, at an elevation of over 700 metres (2,300 ft) above sea level. The highest point in the municipality is the 1,161.82-metre (3,811.7 ft) tall mountain Reinshornheii in the northwestern part of the municipality. The municipality stretches from the small town Byglandsfjord in the south to the farms at Langeid in the north. Lake Byglandsfjorden is 40 kilometres (25 mi) long and lies on the river Otra. Other lakes include the Åraksfjorden, Gyvatn, Hovatn, Kvifjorden, Longerakvatnet, Straumsfjorden, and Topsæ. The rivers Otra and Topdalsfjorden both run through Bygland on their way south. The Reiårsfossen waterfall is one of many waterfalls in the municipality.

== Climate ==
Byglandsfjord is situated inland in the southernmost of Norway's main valleys and has a humid continental climate (Dfb) or temperate oceanic climate (Cfb), depending on winter threshold used (0 °C (32 °F) or −3 °C (27 °F)). The precipitation pattern, with autumn and winter as wettest seasons, is in line with an oceanic climate. The all-time high 33.7 °C (92.7 °F) was recorded in July 1986. The all-time low −31 °C (−24 °F) is from January 1941. The coldest low after 1980 is −23.6 °C (−10.5 °F) recorded February 1986.

Climate data for Byglandsfjord - Neset 1991-2020 (207 m, avg high/low 2012-2025, extremes 1919-2020 includes earlier stations)
Month	Jan	Feb	Mar	Apr	May	Jun	Jul	Aug	Sep	Oct	Nov	Dec	Year
Record high °C (°F)	11.7 (53.1)	13.4 (56.1)	18.4 (65.1)	24.4 (75.9)	29.4 (84.9)	32.1 (89.8)	33.7 (92.7)	31.7 (89.1)	25.4 (77.7)	20.7 (69.3)	15.9 (60.6)	12.3 (54.1)	33.7 (92.7)
Mean daily maximum °C (°F)	1.6 (34.9)	2.7 (36.9)	6.3 (43.3)	10.6 (51.1)	16.2 (61.2)	20.1 (68.2)	21.7 (71.1)	20 (68)	16.6 (61.9)	10.8 (51.4)	6.2 (43.2)	3.3 (37.9)	11.3 (52.4)
Daily mean °C (°F)	−1.1 (30.0)	−1.4 (29.5)	0.9 (33.6)	5 (41)	9.7 (49.5)	13.9 (57.0)	16.1 (61.0)	15.2 (59.4)	11.8 (53.2)	6.9 (44.4)	3.1 (37.6)	0.1 (32.2)	6.7 (44.0)
Mean daily minimum °C (°F)	−3.1 (26.4)	−3.2 (26.2)	−1.4 (29.5)	1.1 (34.0)	5.9 (42.6)	10.4 (50.7)	12.6 (54.7)	11.8 (53.2)	9.6 (49.3)	5.5 (41.9)	1.7 (35.1)	−1 (30)	4.2 (39.5)
Record low °C (°F)	−31 (−24)	−27.5 (−17.5)	−22.6 (−8.7)	−19.9 (−3.8)	−7.1 (19.2)	−2.8 (27.0)	0.6 (33.1)	−0.8 (30.6)	−5.7 (21.7)	−11 (12)	−16.2 (2.8)	−20.1 (−4.2)	−31 (−24)
Average precipitation mm (inches)	126 (5.0)	80 (3.1)	72 (2.8)	60 (2.4)	74 (2.9)	82 (3.2)	85 (3.3)	111 (4.4)	105 (4.1)	138 (5.4)	129 (5.1)	122 (4.8)	1,184 (46.5)
Average precipitation days (≥ 1.0 mm)	15	13	11	10	10	11	11	12	12	15	15	14	149
Source: yr.no, weatheronline; Seklima (avg high/low)

== History ==
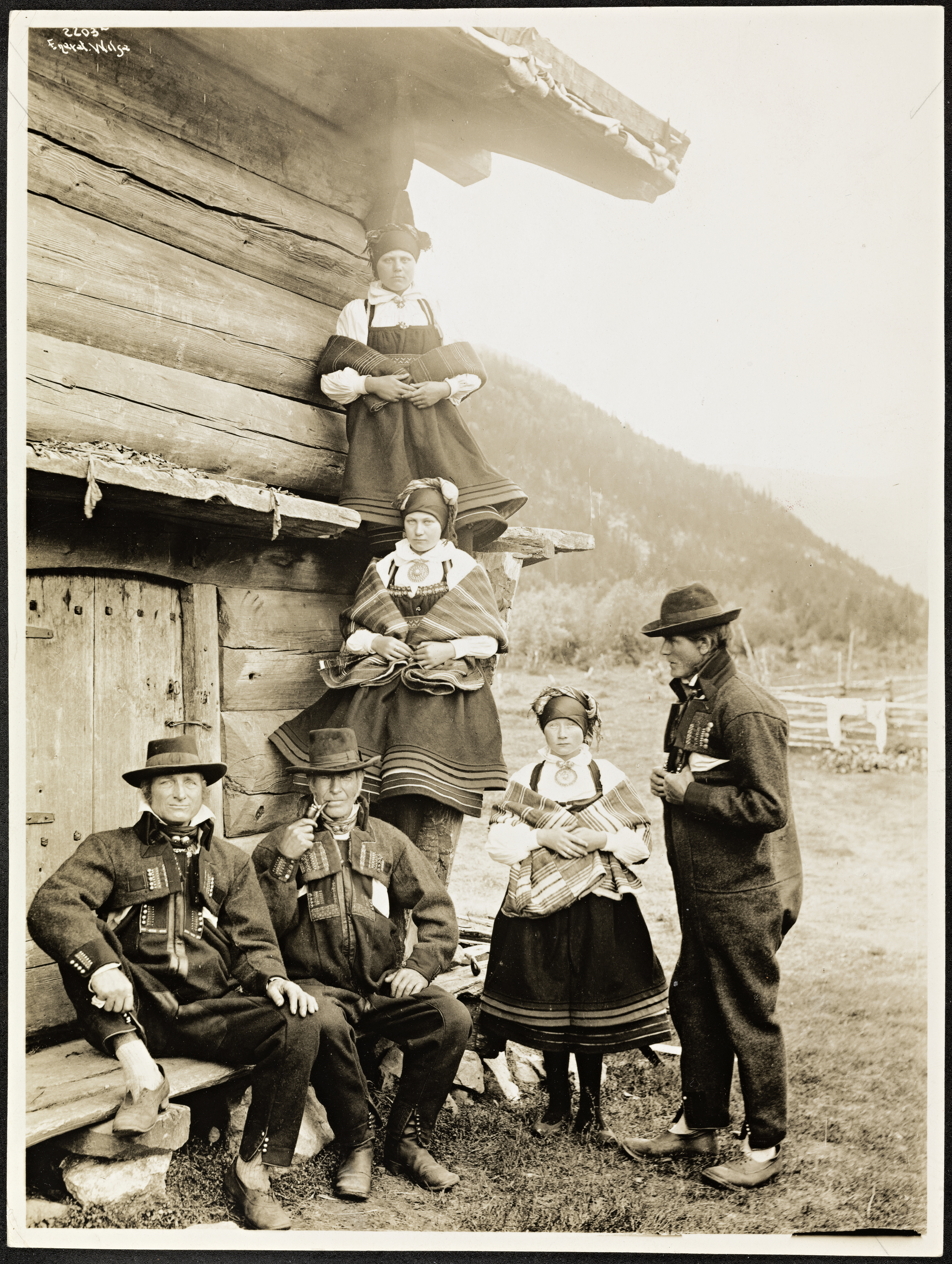
View of Bygland farmers (c. 1885)

The Setesdal Line was a narrow-gauge steam railway which went between Vennesla and Byglandsfjord in Bygland. It was built in 1896. The Setesdal Line's operation was terminated in 1962 and the track was removed between Byglandsfjord and Beihølen.

Other transport up the Setesdal valley was provided by the steamships SS Bjoren and Dølen. First placed in operation in 1866, the SS Bjoren is still in operation as a tourist attraction on lake Byglandsfjorden during the summers.

== Government ==
Bygland Municipality is responsible for primary education (through 10th grade), outpatient health services, senior citizen services, welfare and other social services, zoning, economic development, and municipal roads and utilities. The municipality is governed by a municipal council of directly elected representatives. The mayor is indirectly elected by a vote of the municipal council. The municipality is under the jurisdiction of the Agder District Court and the Agder Court of Appeal.

=== Municipal council ===
The municipal council (Kommunestyre) of Bygland Municipality is made up of 15 representatives that are elected to four year terms. The tables below show the current and historical composition of the council by political party.

Bygland kommunestyre 2023–2027
Party name (in Nynorsk)	Number of representatives
Labour Party (Arbeidarpartiet)	4
Conservative Party (Høgre)	6
Pensioners' Party (Pensjonistpartiet)	1
Centre Party (Senterpartiet)	4
Total number of members:	15

Bygland kommunestyre 2019–2023
Party name (in Nynorsk)	Number of representatives
Labour Party (Arbeidarpartiet)	4
Conservative Party (Høgre)	4
Centre Party (Senterpartiet)	4
Setesdal List (Setesdalslista)	3
Total number of members:	15

Bygland kommunestyre 2015–2019
Party name (in Nynorsk)	Number of representatives
Labour Party (Arbeidarpartiet)	3
Centre Party (Senterpartiet)	5
Joint list of the Conservative Party (Høgre) and the Liberal Party (Venstre)	4
Bygland local list (Bygland Bygdeliste)	3
Total number of members:	15

Bygland kommunestyre 2011–2015
Party name (in Nynorsk)	Number of representatives
Labour Party (Arbeidarpartiet)	3
Centre Party (Senterpartiet)	5
Joint list of the Conservative Party (Høgre) and the Liberal Party (Venstre)	3
Bygland local list (Bygland Bygdeliste)	4
Total number of members:	15

Bygland kommunestyre 2007–2011
Party name (in Nynorsk)	Number of representatives
Labour Party (Arbeidarpartiet)	2
Christian Democratic Party (Kristeleg Folkeparti)	2
Centre Party (Senterpartiet)	4
Joint list of the Conservative Party (Høgre) and the Liberal Party (Venstre)	2
Bygland local list (Bygland Bygdeliste)	5
Total number of members:	15

Bygland kommunestyre 2003–2007
Party name (in Nynorsk)	Number of representatives
Labour Party (Arbeidarpartiet)	2
Christian Democratic Party (Kristeleg Folkeparti)	2
Centre Party (Senterpartiet)	6
Bygland local list (Bygland Bygdeliste)	5
Total number of members:	15

Bygland kommunestyre 1999–2003
Party name (in Nynorsk)	Number of representatives
Labour Party (Arbeidarpartiet)	4
Conservative Party (Høgre)	2
Christian Democratic Party (Kristeleg Folkeparti)	2
Centre Party (Senterpartiet)	7
Total number of members:	15

Bygland kommunestyre 1995–1999
Party name (in Nynorsk)	Number of representatives
Labour Party (Arbeidarpartiet)	6
Conservative Party (Høgre)	2
Christian Democratic Party (Kristeleg Folkeparti)	2
Centre Party (Senterpartiet)	5
Total number of members:	15

Bygland kommunestyre 1991–1995
Party name (in Nynorsk)	Number of representatives
Labour Party (Arbeidarpartiet)	5
Conservative Party (Høgre)	2
Christian Democratic Party (Kristeleg Folkeparti)	2
Centre Party (Senterpartiet)	4
Liberal Party (Venstre)	2
Total number of members:	15

Bygland kommunestyre 1987–1991
Party name (in Nynorsk)	Number of representatives
Labour Party (Arbeidarpartiet)	8
Conservative Party (Høgre)	3
Christian Democratic Party (Kristeleg Folkeparti)	3
Centre Party (Senterpartiet)	5
Liberal Party (Venstre)	2
Total number of members:	21

Bygland kommunestyre 1983–1987
Party name (in Nynorsk)	Number of representatives
Labour Party (Arbeidarpartiet)	8
Conservative Party (Høgre)	4
Christian Democratic Party (Kristeleg Folkeparti)	3
Centre Party (Senterpartiet)	5
Liberal Party (Venstre)	1
Total number of members:	21

Bygland kommunestyre 1979–1983
Party name (in Nynorsk)	Number of representatives
Labour Party (Arbeidarpartiet)	8
Conservative Party (Høgre)	3
Christian Democratic Party (Kristeleg Folkeparti)	3
Centre Party (Senterpartiet)	7
Total number of members:	21

Bygland kommunestyre 1975–1979
Party name (in Nynorsk)	Number of representatives
Labour Party (Arbeidarpartiet)	7
Christian Democratic Party (Kristeleg Folkeparti)	4
Centre Party (Senterpartiet)	10
Total number of members:	21

Bygland kommunestyre 1971–1975
Party name (in Nynorsk)	Number of representatives
Labour Party (Arbeidarpartiet)	9
Christian Democratic Party (Kristeleg Folkeparti)	3
Centre Party (Senterpartiet)	8
Liberal Party (Venstre)	1
Total number of members:	21

Bygland kommunestyre 1967–1971
Party name (in Nynorsk)	Number of representatives
Labour Party (Arbeidarpartiet)	10
Christian Democratic Party (Kristeleg Folkeparti)	2
Centre Party (Senterpartiet)	7
Liberal Party (Venstre)	2
Total number of members:	21

Bygland kommunestyre 1963–1967
Party name (in Nynorsk)	Number of representatives
Labour Party (Arbeidarpartiet)	11
Christian Democratic Party (Kristeleg Folkeparti)	2
Centre Party (Senterpartiet)	6
Liberal Party (Venstre)	2
Total number of members:	21

Bygland heradsstyre 1959–1963
Party name (in Nynorsk)	Number of representatives
Labour Party (Arbeidarpartiet)	9
Christian Democratic Party (Kristeleg Folkeparti)	3
Centre Party (Senterpartiet)	7
Liberal Party (Venstre)	2
Total number of members:	21

Bygland heradsstyre 1955–1959
Party name (in Nynorsk)	Number of representatives
Labour Party (Arbeidarpartiet)	9
Christian Democratic Party (Kristeleg Folkeparti)	3
Farmers' Party (Bondepartiet)	7
Liberal Party (Venstre)	2
Total number of members:	21

Bygland heradsstyre 1951–1955
Party name (in Nynorsk)	Number of representatives
Labour Party (Arbeidarpartiet)	8
Christian Democratic Party (Kristeleg Folkeparti)	2
Farmers' Party (Bondepartiet)	8
Liberal Party (Venstre)	2
Total number of members:	20

Bygland heradsstyre 1947–1951
Party name (in Nynorsk)	Number of representatives
Labour Party (Arbeidarpartiet)	9
Christian Democratic Party (Kristeleg Folkeparti)	2
Farmers' Party (Bondepartiet)	4
Joint List(s) of Non-Socialist Parties (Borgarlege Felleslister)	5
Total number of members:	20

Bygland heradsstyre 1945–1947
Party name (in Nynorsk)	Number of representatives
Labour Party (Arbeidarpartiet)	11
Farmers' Party (Bondepartiet)	2
Joint List(s) of Non-Socialist Parties (Borgarlege Felleslister)	7
Total number of members:	20

Bygland heradsstyre 1937–1941*
Party name (in Nynorsk)	Number of representatives
Labour Party (Arbeidarpartiet)	9
Farmers' Party (Bondepartiet)	6
Liberal Party (Venstre)	1
Joint list of the Conservative Party (Høgre) and the Liberal Party (Venstre)	3
Local List(s) (Lokale lister)	1
Total number of members:	20
Note: Due to the German occupation of Norway during World War II, no elections were held for new municipal councils until after the war ended in 1945.

=== Mayors ===
The mayor (Nynorsk: ordførar) of NAME Municipality is the political leader of the municipality and the chairperson of the municipal council. The following people have held this position:

- 1838–1841: Rev. C.A. Münster
- 1841–1851: Rev. Andreas Møglestue
- 1851–1863: Gunstein Grundeson Frøyrak
- 1863–1866: Gunstein Jørundson Langerak
- 1866–1869: Daniel Grundeson Aakhus
- 1869–1879: Gunnar Olavson Nese
- 1879–1887: Olav Grundeson Aakhus
- 1887–1889: Tarald Bjørgulvson Langeid
- 1889–1902: Lars Knutson Liestøl (V)
- 1902–1908: Aasulv Lande
- 1908–1911: Tarkjel K. Austad
- 1911–1914: Aasulv Lande
- 1914–1917: Olav T. Nordgaren
- 1917–1923: Aanund O. Langerak
- 1923–1929: Knut O. Sandnes
- 1929–1935: Jørund Kvaale (Bp)
- 1935–1941: Nere Aakhus (V)
- 1941–1942: Olav Ottar Abusdal (NS)
- 1942–1945: Gunnar Heistein (NS)
- 1945–1945: Gunnar Lande
- 1945–1947: Hallvard Lidi
- 1947–1958: Jørund Kvaale (Bp)
- 1958–1959: Osmund Faremo (Ap)
- 1960–1963: Tarkjel Langerak
- 1963–1966: Osmund Faremo (Ap)
- 1966–1968: Hallvard Frøysnes (Ap)
- 1968–1972: Gunnar Gakkestad (Sp)
- 1972–1985: Knut P. Sandnes (Sp)
- 1985–1987: Magnhild Rygg (Sp)
- 1988–1991: Sigbjørn Horverak (KrF)
- 1992–1995: Torbjørn Borgi (Ap)
- 1995–2011: Knut A. Austad (Sp)
- 2011–2019: Leiv Rygg Langerak (Sp)
- 2019–2023: Sigbjørn Åge Fossdal (Ap)
- 2023–present: Runar Granheim (Ap)

== Attractions ==
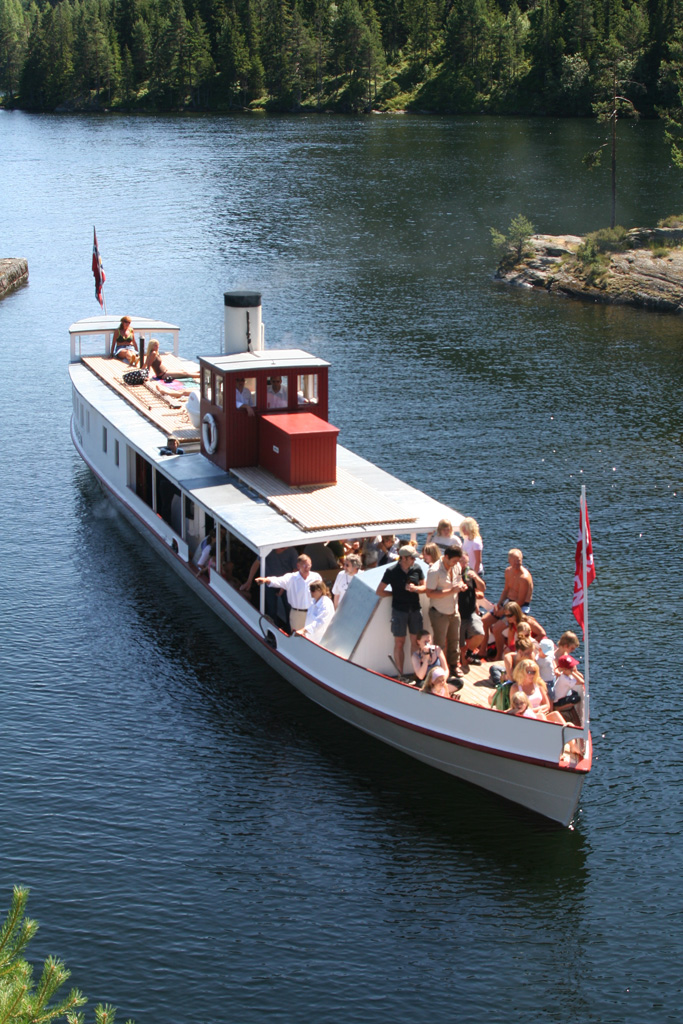
View of the SS Bjoren

- Byglandsfjord Station, a former railway station constructed in 1896
- SS Bjoren, a wood-fuelled heritage steamboat that travels the route between Byglandsfjord-Bygland and Bygland-Ose on the lake Byglandsfjorden in the summer
- Bygland tower, a folk museum

== Notable people ==
- Even Torkildsen Lande (1758 in Bygland – 1833), a farmer and blacksmith who served on the Norwegian Constitutional Assembly
- Oscar Castberg (1846 in Bygland – 1917), a painter and sculptor
- Hallvard Sandnes (1893 in Sandnes - 1968), a schoolteacher and writer
- Olav Bø (1918 in Bygland – 1998), a Norwegian folklorist
- Kjell Kristian Rike (1944 in Byglandsfjord – 2008), a sports commentator
