= Grendi =

Village in Bygland Municipality, Norway

- Village
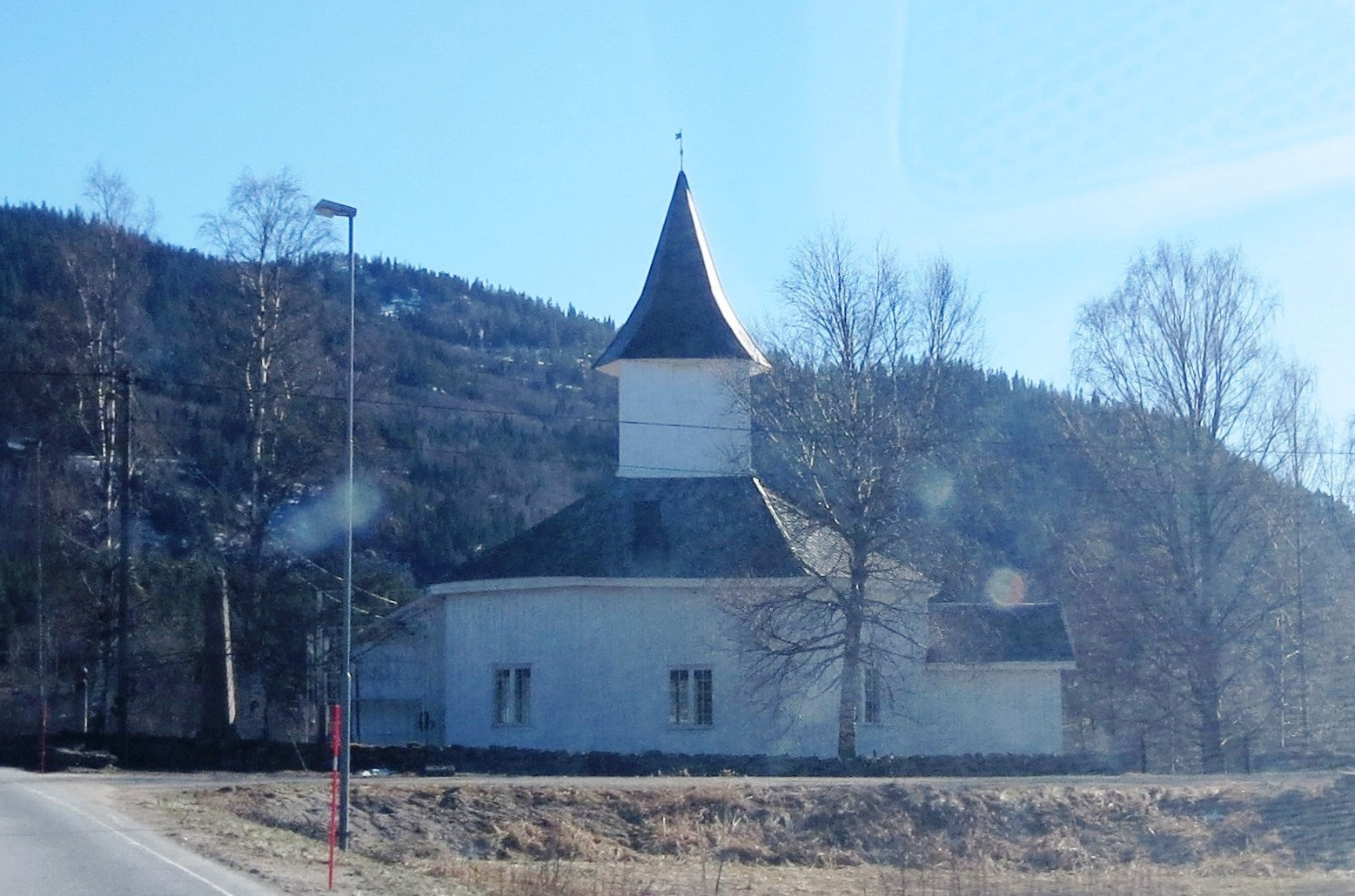
- View of the village church
- Interactive map of Grendi
- Coordinates: 58.7069°N 07.8250°E
- Country: Norway
- Region: Southern Norway
- County: Agder
- District: Setesdal
- Municipality: Bygland Municipality
- Elevation: 208 m (682 ft)
- Time zone: UTC+01:00 (CET)
  - Summer (DST): UTC+02:00 (CEST)
- Post Code: 4742 Grendi

Grendi is a village in Bygland Municipality in Agder county, Norway. The village is located on the east side of the lake Byglandsfjorden in the south part of the municipality. Grendi sits along the Norwegian National Road 9 about 5 kilometres (3.1 mi) north of the village of Byglandsfjorden and about 6 kilometres (3.7 mi) south of the village of Longerak. Årdal Church is located in the village. In the early 1900s, a tuberculosis sanatorium was established in Grendi.
