= Byglandsfjorden =

Lake in Agder, Norway

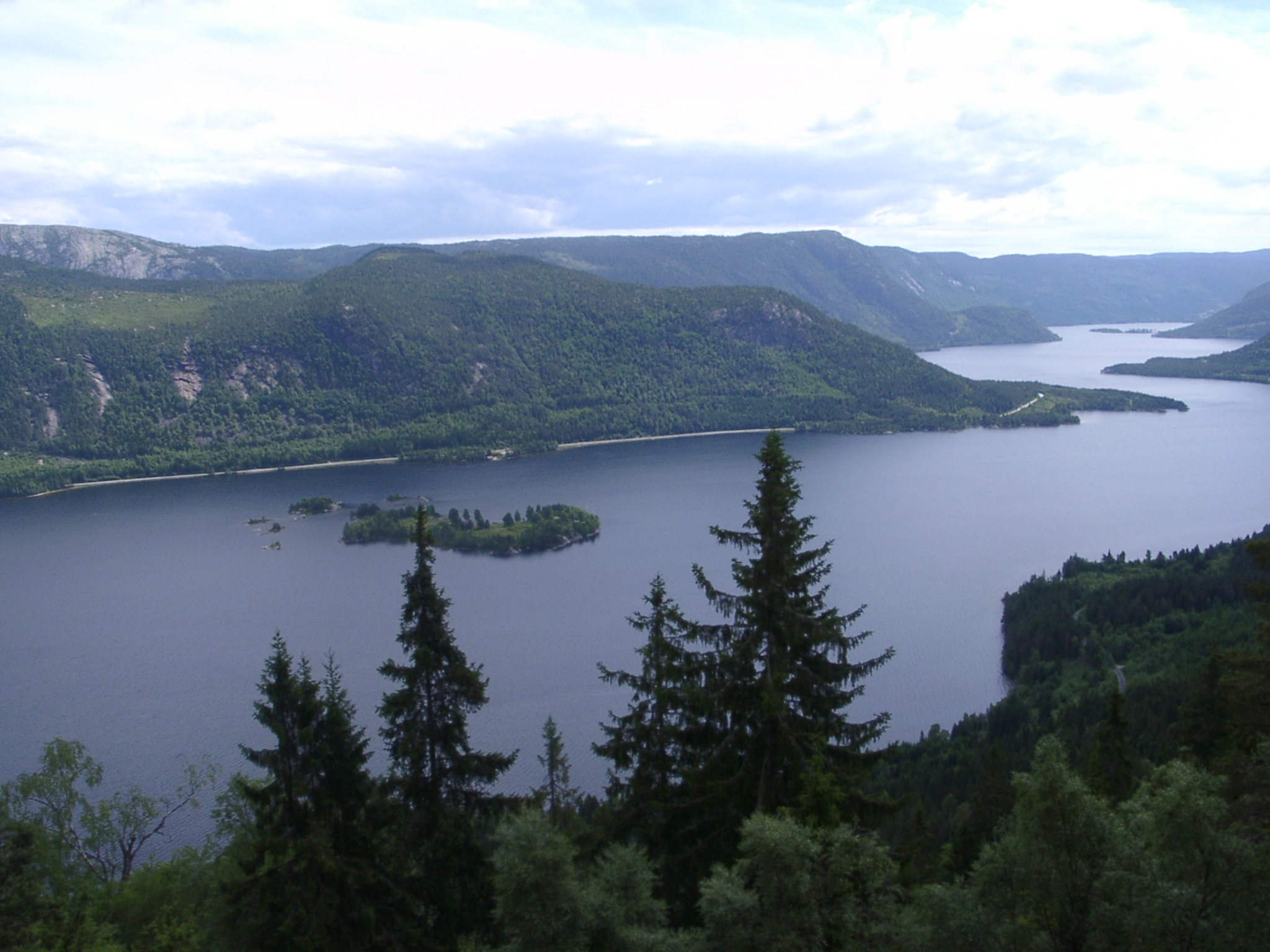
- View of the Byglandsfjorden
- Interactive map of Byglandsfjorden
- Location: Bygland Municipality, Agder
- Coordinates: 58.7016°N 07.7996°E
- Primary inflows: Åraksfjorden
- Primary outflows: Otra river
- Catchment area: Otra watershed
- Basin countries: Norway
- Max. length: 34 kilometres (21 mi)
- Max. width: 2.7 kilometres (1.7 mi)
- Surface area: 32.79 km^{2} (12.66 sq mi)
- Shore length^{1}: 87.57 kilometres (54.41 mi)
- Surface elevation: 203 metres (666 ft)
- Settlements: Byglandsfjord
- References: NVE
- ^{1} Shore length is not a well-defined measure.

Byglandsfjorden is a lake in Agder county, Norway. The 32.79-square-kilometre (12.66 sq mi) lake lies on the river Otra, primarily in Bygland Municipality, but the far southern tip of the lake extends into the neighboring Evje og Hornnes Municipality. The river flows out of the lake Åraksfjorden to the north and into the Byglandsfjorden through a narrow channel, and the southern end of the Byglandsfjorden is marked by a dam along the river. The villages of Byglandsfjord, Grendi, Longerak, Lauvdal, and Bygland are all located on the eastern shore of the lake along the Norwegian National Road 9. The western shore of the lake is much more sparsely populated, with County Road 304 following that shoreline.

The SS Bjoren is a wood-fueled steamboat that travels on the Byglandsfjorden in the summers between the villages of Ose (on the Åraksfjorden), Bygland, and Byglandsfjord. Prior to the opening of the roads along the shoreline, steamboat travel was the main method of transportation for those traveling north through the Setesdal valley.

There is a special relict species of salmon that live in Byglandsfjorden, called bleke. This species of salmon only occurs right there. These are salmon which are not wandering, they spend their entire lives in freshwater.

== See also ==
- List of lakes in Aust-Agder
- List of lakes in Norway
