= Bygland (village) =

Village in Bygland Municipality, Norway

- Village
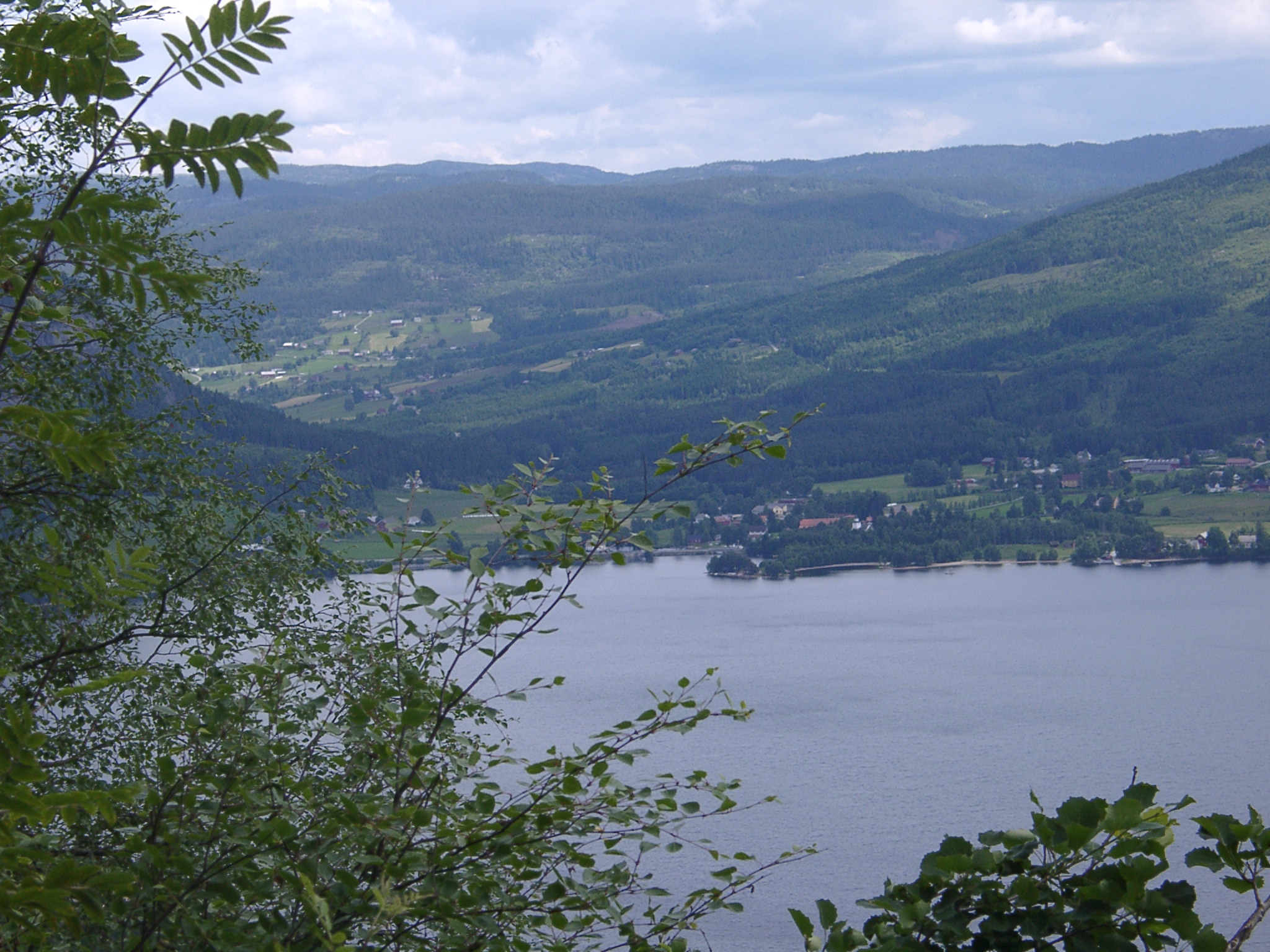
- View of the village along the shore with the village of Jordalsbø further inland
- Interactive map of Bygland
- Coordinates: 58.8285°N 07.7962°E
- Country: Norway
- Region: Southern Norway
- County: Agder
- District: Setesdal
- Municipality: Bygland Municipality

Area
  - Total: 0.47 km^{2} (0.18 sq mi)
- Elevation: 207 m (679 ft)

Population (2019)
  - Total: 242
  - Density: 515/km^{2} (1,330/sq mi)
- Time zone: UTC+01:00 (CET)
  - Summer (DST): UTC+02:00 (CEST)
- Post Code: 4745 Bygland

Bygland is the administrative centre of Bygland Municipality in Agder county, Norway. The village is located on the eastern shore of the lake Byglandsfjorden, near the northern end of the lake. The village lies along the Norwegian National Road 9, about 6 kilometres (3.7 mi) north of the village of Lauvdal and about 8 kilometres (5.0 mi) southeast of the village of Skåmedal. The village is the site of the municipal government, old-age home, medical clinic, and Bygland Church. There is a private Christian high school, KVS Bygland, that is also located in this village.

The 0.47-square-kilometre (120-acre) village had a population (2019) of 242 and a population density of 515 inhabitants per square kilometre (1,330/sq mi). Since 2019, the population and area data for this village area has not been separately tracked by Statistics Norway.
