= Svarvarnuten =

Mountain in Agder, Norway

Highest point
- Elevation: 1,378 m (4,521 ft)
- Prominence: 178 m (584 ft)
- Parent peak: Urdalsknuten
- Isolation: 3.4 km (2.1 mi)
- Coordinates: 59°11′37″N 7°23′53″E

Geography
- Location: Agder, Norway
- Parent range: Setesdalsheiene

Svarvarnuten is a mountain in Valle Municipality in Agder county, Norway. The 1,378-metre (4,521 ft) tall mountain is located in the Setesdalsheiene mountains, about 7 kilometres (4.3 mi) west of the village of Valle and about 13 kilometres (8.1 mi) northwest of the village of Rysstad. The lake Botnsvatnet lies about 7 kilometres (4.3 mi) west of the mountain.

== See also ==
- List of mountains of Norway
