= Skjerkenuten =

Mountain in Agder, Norway

Highest point
- Elevation: 1,405 m (4,610 ft)
- Prominence: 72 m (236 ft)
- Parent peak: Skammevarden
- Isolation: 2 km (1.2 mi)
- Coordinates: 59°13′46″N 7°12′56″E

Geography
- Location: Agder, Norway
- Parent range: Setesdalsheiene

Skjerkenuten is a mountain in Valle Municipality in Agder county, Norway. The 1,404-metre (4,606 ft) tall mountain has a topographic prominence of 70 metres (230 ft). It is the 18th highest mountain in Agder county. It is located in the Setesdalsheiene mountains, about 18 kilometres (11 mi) west of the village of Valle and about the same distance southwest of the village of Bykle.

== See also ==
- List of mountains of Norway
