= Tveitetunet =

Museum in Valle, Norway

- Established: 1969
- Location: Tveiti, Valle Municipality, Norway
- Coordinates: 59.1927°N 7.5295°E
- Type: Open-air farm museum
- Owner: Setesdal Museum
- Parking: 75 metres (246 ft)
- Website: setesdalsmuseet.no

Tveitetunet is an open-air museum located in Valle Municipality in Agder county, Norway. The museum lies at the Nordigard Tveiten (Tveiti) farm about 3 kilometres (1.9 mi) south of the village of Valle, just about 1.2 kilometres (0.75 mi) up the hill to the east of the Norwegian National Road 9, just east of the river Otra. The museum was opened in 1977, and it consists of a courtyard and several surrounding farm buildings on a 10-decare (2.5-acre) piece of farmland.

== History ==
Nordigard Tveiten was once the home of the district sheriff Olav Knutsson Tveiten. He was a representative at the Norwegian Constituent Assembly at Eidsvoll Manor in 1814 and he served as the local sheriff from 1785 until his death in 1837.

The Tveitetunet farm became part of Setesdal Museum (Setesdalsmuseet) in 1969 and it was opened to the public in 1977. During the eight years prior to its opening, it underwent some restoration work. The farm was chosen because of its good condition and that it was representative of the old farms that once covered the Setesdal region of Norway. The Setesdal Museum was established in 1935 to preserve the historic artifacts, buildings, and traditions of the Setesdal region. The museum is responsible for approximately 70 historic buildings throughout the Setesdalen valley, including the Rygnestadtunet museum several kilometers to the north. In 1974, the museum purchased an old barn with a stable and cowshed from a neighboring farm in Valle which were moved and erected on the site of Tveitetunet and then again in 1987 the museum purchased a mill house for the farm and restored it. The museum is regularly used for tours, exhibitions, and cultural gatherings in the summers.
