= Kolsvatnet =

Lake in Agder, Norway

- Interactive map of Kolsvatnet
- Location: Valle Municipality, Agder
- Coordinates: 59.16067°N 7.29487°E
- Basin countries: Norway
- Max. length: 3.75 kilometres (2.33 mi)
- Max. width: 1.7 kilometres (1.1 mi)
- Surface area: 2.72 km^{2} (1.05 sq mi)
- Shore length^{1}: 11.82 kilometres (7.34 mi)
- Surface elevation: 1,034 metres (3,392 ft)
- References: NVE
- ^{1} Shore length is not a well-defined measure.

Kolsvatnet is a lake in Valle Municipality in Agder county, Norway. It is located about 14 kilometres (8.7 mi) southwest of the village of Valle and about 15 kilometres (9.3 mi) northwest of the village of Rysstad. The lake is located south of the lake Botnsvatnet, east of the mountain Urddalsknuten, and northeast of the lake Rosskreppfjorden. The lake has an area of 2.72 square kilometres (1.05 sq mi) and sits at an elevation of 1,034 metres (3,392 ft) above sea level.

== See also ==
- List of lakes in Aust-Agder
- List of lakes in Norway
