= Rygnestad =

Village in Valle Municipality, Norway

- Village
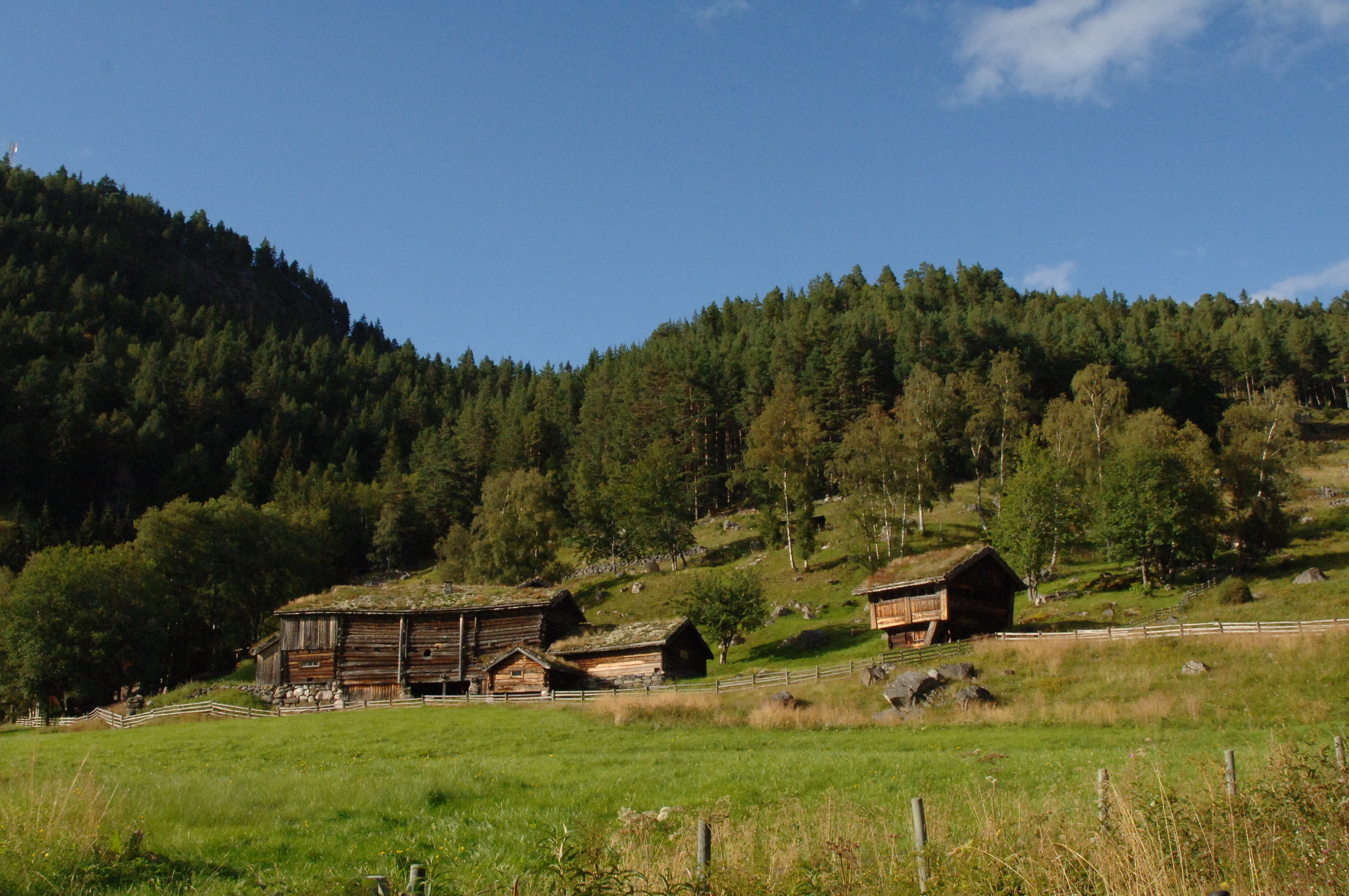
- View of Nordigard Rygnestad
- Interactive map of Rygnestad
- Coordinates: 59.2612°N 07.4900°E
- Country: Norway
- Region: Southern Norway
- County: Agder
- District: Setesdal
- Municipality: Valle Municipality
- Elevation: 432 m (1,417 ft)
- Time zone: UTC+01:00 (CET)
  - Summer (DST): UTC+02:00 (CEST)
- Post Code: 4748 Valle

Rygnestad is a village in Valle Municipality in Agder county, Norway. The village is located along the Norwegian National Road 9 in the Setesdal valley. The village lies about 1 kilometre (0.62 mi) east of the river Otra in northern Valle, about 8 kilometres (5.0 mi) south of the lake Store Bjørnevatn. Rygnestad is about 8 kilometres (5.0 mi) north of the village of Valle, the administrative centre of the municipality. The Rygnestadtunet museum is located just north of the village.
