= Anders Thorsen Syrtveit =

Norwegian architect

- Born: Anders Thorsen Syrtveit; 1778; Iveland, Norway
- Died: 1857 (aged 78–79); Evje, Norway
- Other name: Anders kirkebygger
- Occupation: Architect
- Years active: 1827-1844
- Known for: Octagonal churches in Norway

Anders Thorsen Syrtveit, also known as Anders Thorson Syrtveit and Anders Thorsen Solberg, (born 1778 in Iveland, died 1857 in Evje) was a Norwegian builder and architect. Syrtveit also went by the name "Anders kirkebygger" (lit. 'Anders Church-builder') and is especially known for a number of church buildings in Southern Norway, particularly in the Setesdal region of Agder. Syrtveit is listed both as an architect and builder for several churches. The boundaries between these professions were unclear because the old builders "built on their own" without formal architecture training. He built octagonal and cruciform churches in addition to building houses and other types of buildings.

== Works ==
These are the churches that he built (or helped build):

- In Bygland Municipality: Årdal Church, Bygland Church, and Sandnes Church
- In Evje og Hornnes Municipality: Evje Church (demolished in 1891) and Hornnes Church (remodeled the roof and tower)
- In Fyresdal Municipality: Moland Church
- In Iveland Municipality: Iveland Church
- In Valle Municipality: Hylestad Church and Valle Church
- In Vennesla Municipality: Hægeland Church
