= Homme, Agder =

Village in Valle Municipality, Norway

Homme
- Village
- Interactive map of Homme
- Coordinates: 59.2353°N 07.5476°E
- Country: Norway
- Region: Southern Norway
- County: Agder
- District: Setesdal
- Municipality: Valle Municipality
- Elevation: 339 m (1,112 ft)
- Time zone: UTC+01:00 (CET)
  - Summer (DST): UTC+02:00 (CEST)
- Post Code: 4747 Valle

Homme is a village in Valle Municipality in Agder county, Norway. The village is located along the river Otra in the Setesdal valley, about 3.5 kilometres (2.2 mi) north of the village of Valle.

== Popular culture ==
The forests around Homme have their own segment in David Attenborough's documentary, Planet Earth, in episode 10, Seasonal Forest.
