= Bergeheii =

Mountain in Agder, Norway

Highest point
- Elevation: 1,403 m (4,603 ft)
- Prominence: 103 m (338 ft)
- Parent peak: Skammevarden
- Isolation: 3.4 km (2.1 mi)
- Coordinates: 59°11′39″N 7°08′43″E

Geography
- Location: Agder, Norway
- Parent range: Setesdalsheiene

Bergeheii is a mountain in Valle Municipality in Agder county, Norway. The 1,403-metre (4,603 ft) tall mountain has a topographic prominence of 103 metres (338 ft), making it the 19th highest mountain in Agder county. The mountain is located in the Setesdalsheiene mountains, about 20 kilometres (12 mi) west of the village of Valle. The lake Rosskreppfjorden lies to the south of the mountain and the lake Botnsvatnet lies to the southeast of the mountain. The mountain Skammevarden lies about 7 kilometres (4.3 mi) northeast of Bergeheii.

== See also ==
- List of mountains of Norway
