= Tvedten =

Tvedten is a surname. Notable people with the surname include:

- Håvard Tvedten (born 1978), Norwegian handball player
- Olaug Tvedten (born 2000), Norwegian footballer
- Ole Knudsen Tvedten (1757/58–1837), Norwegian farmer
