= Valle Church (Valle) =

Church in Agder, Norway

- Valle kyrkje
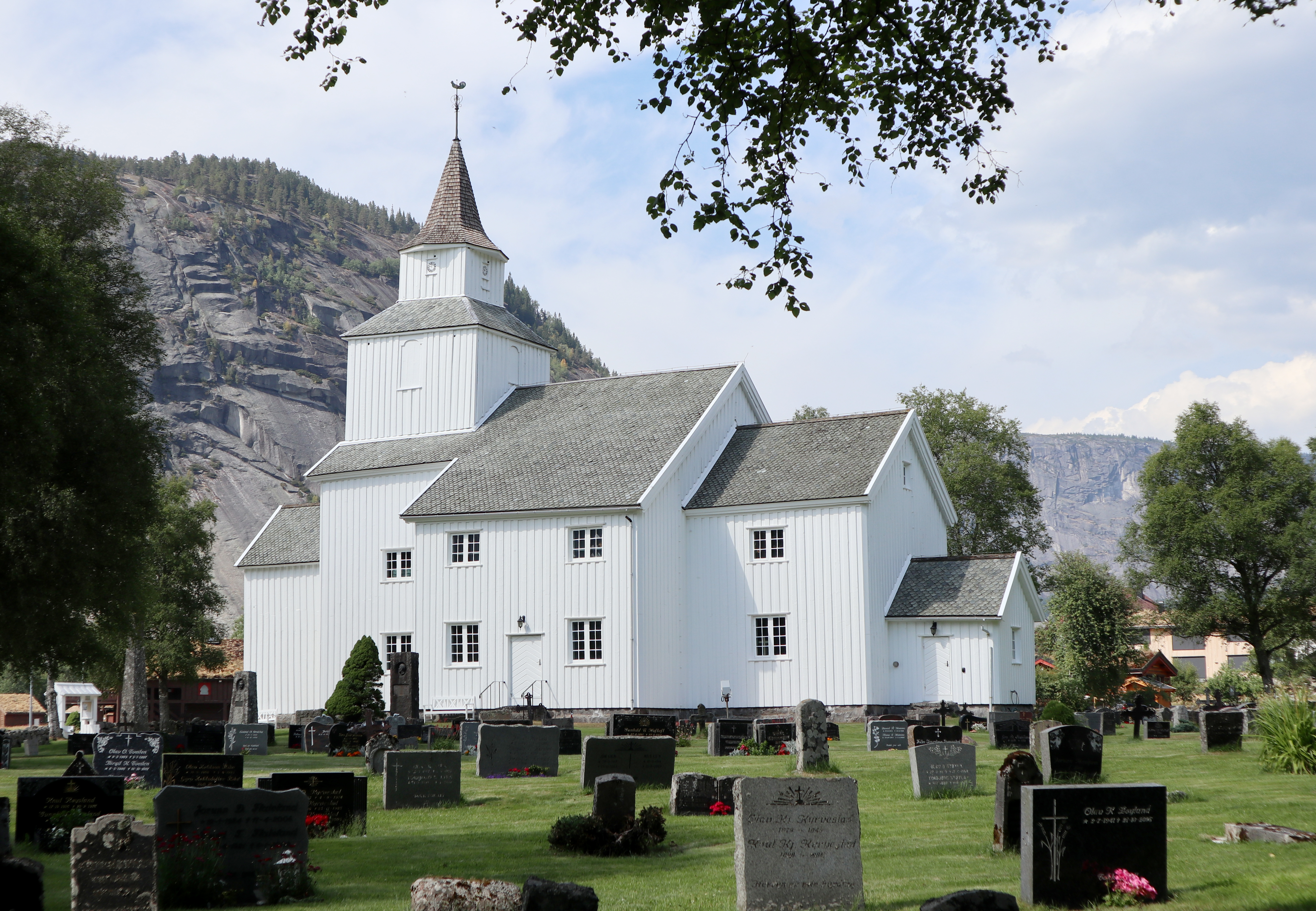
- View of the church
- Valle Church
- 59.2096°N 07.5345°E
- Location: Valle Municipality, Agder
- Country: Norway
- Denomination: Church of Norway
- Churchmanship: Evangelical Lutheran

History
- Status: Parish church
- Founded: 13th century
- Consecrated: 1 Dec 1844

Architecture
- Functional status: Active
- Architect: Hans Linstow
- Architectural type: Cruciform
- Completed: 1844 (182 years ago)

Specifications
- Materials: Wood

Administration
- Diocese: Agder og Telemark
- Deanery: Otredal prosti
- Parish: Valle og Hyllestad
- Norwegian Cultural Heritage Site
- Type: Church
- Status: Automatically protected
- ID: 85750

Valle Church (Norwegian: Valle kyrkje) is a parish church of the Church of Norway in Valle Municipality in Agder county, Norway. It is located in the village of Valle. It is one of the churches for the Valle og Hylestad parish which is part of the Otredal prosti (deanery) in the Diocese of Agder og Telemark. The white, wooden church was built in a cruciform design in 1844 by Anders Thorsen Syrtveit who used plans drawn up by the famous architect Hans Linstow.

The main part of the church is 7.6 by 13.9 metres (25 ft × 46 ft) and the choir is 7.6 by 6 metres (25 ft × 20 ft). Altogether with the entrance and the sacristy, the church is 233 square metres (2,510 sq ft). The church seats about 400 people comfortably on the main floor and in the upper gallery. Traditionally, the gallery sat about 150 unmarried people and the main floor sat about 350 married people. The steeple is 22 metres (72 ft) tall.

== History ==
The earliest existing historical records of the church date back to the year 1328, but it was not new that year. The old church was a stave church building that stood for centuries, likely being built in the 13th century. Historically, the church was the main parish church and the priest who worked here, also served the annex parish of Hylestad Church, plus the priest also went to the neighboring rural parish of Bykle Church for three services per year in the 1600s, since they didn't have their own priest for many years. In the 1660s, the old stave church was torn down and replaced with a new church on the same site.

In 1814, this church served as an election church (Norwegian: valgkirke). Together with more than 300 other parish churches across Norway, it was a polling station for elections to the 1814 Norwegian Constituent Assembly which wrote the Constitution of Norway. This was Norway's first national elections. Each church parish was a constituency that elected people called "electors" who later met together in each county to elect the representatives for the assembly that was to meet at Eidsvoll Manor later that year.

In 1844, the small church was torn down and replaced with a new timber-framed cruciform church on the same site. The new building was consecrated on 1 December 1844. In 1862, the rectory near the church burned down.

== Media gallery ==
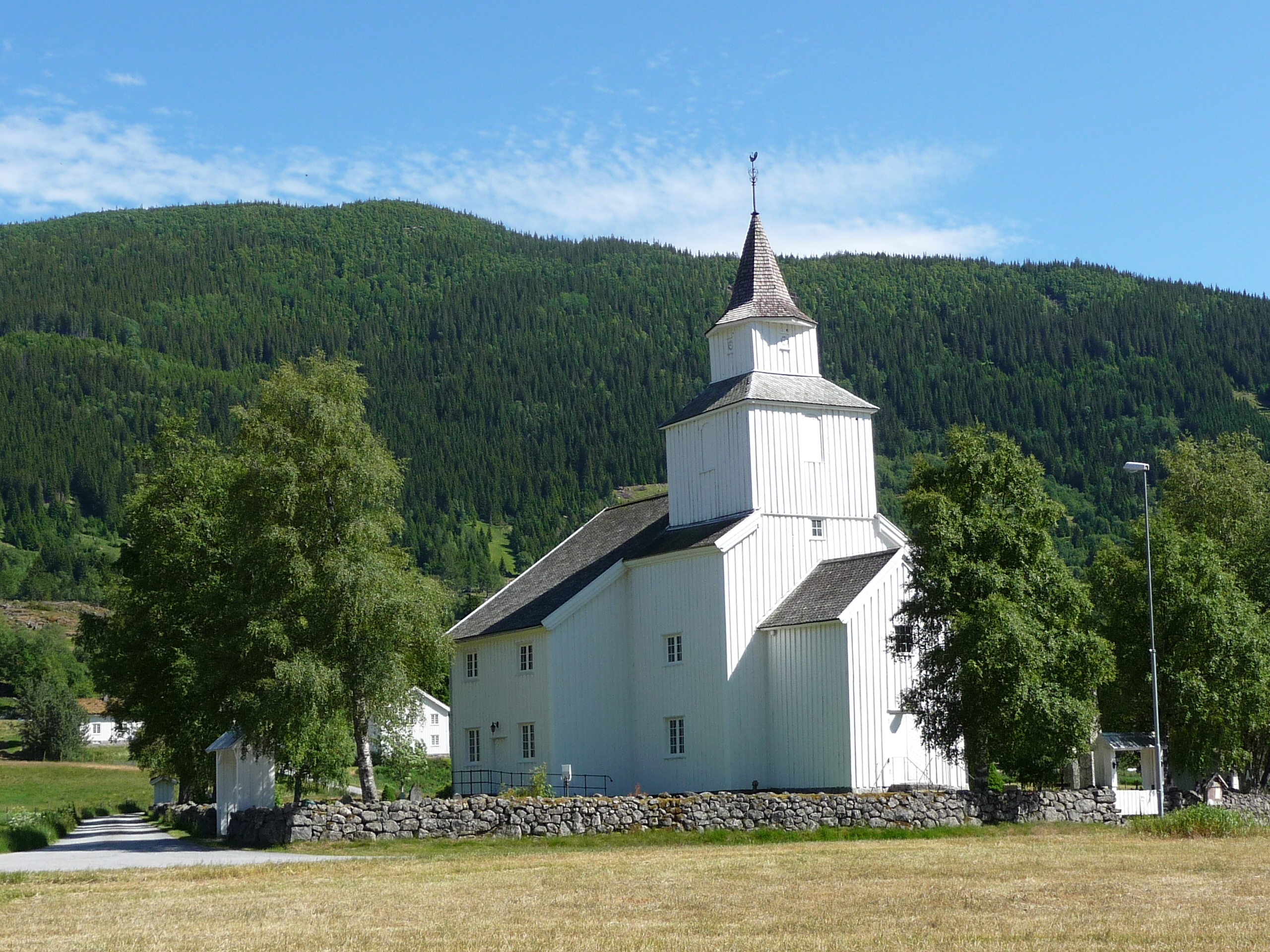

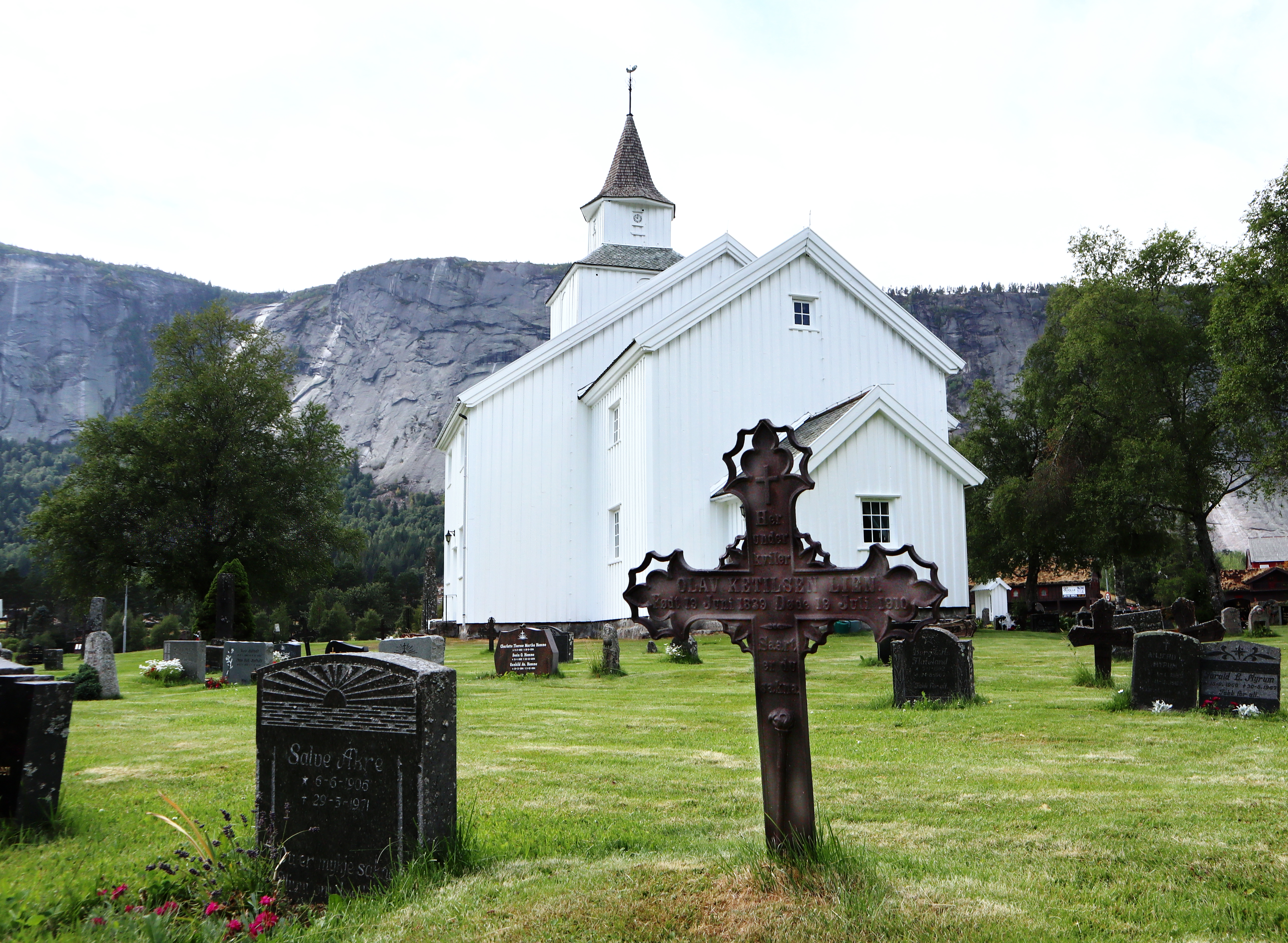

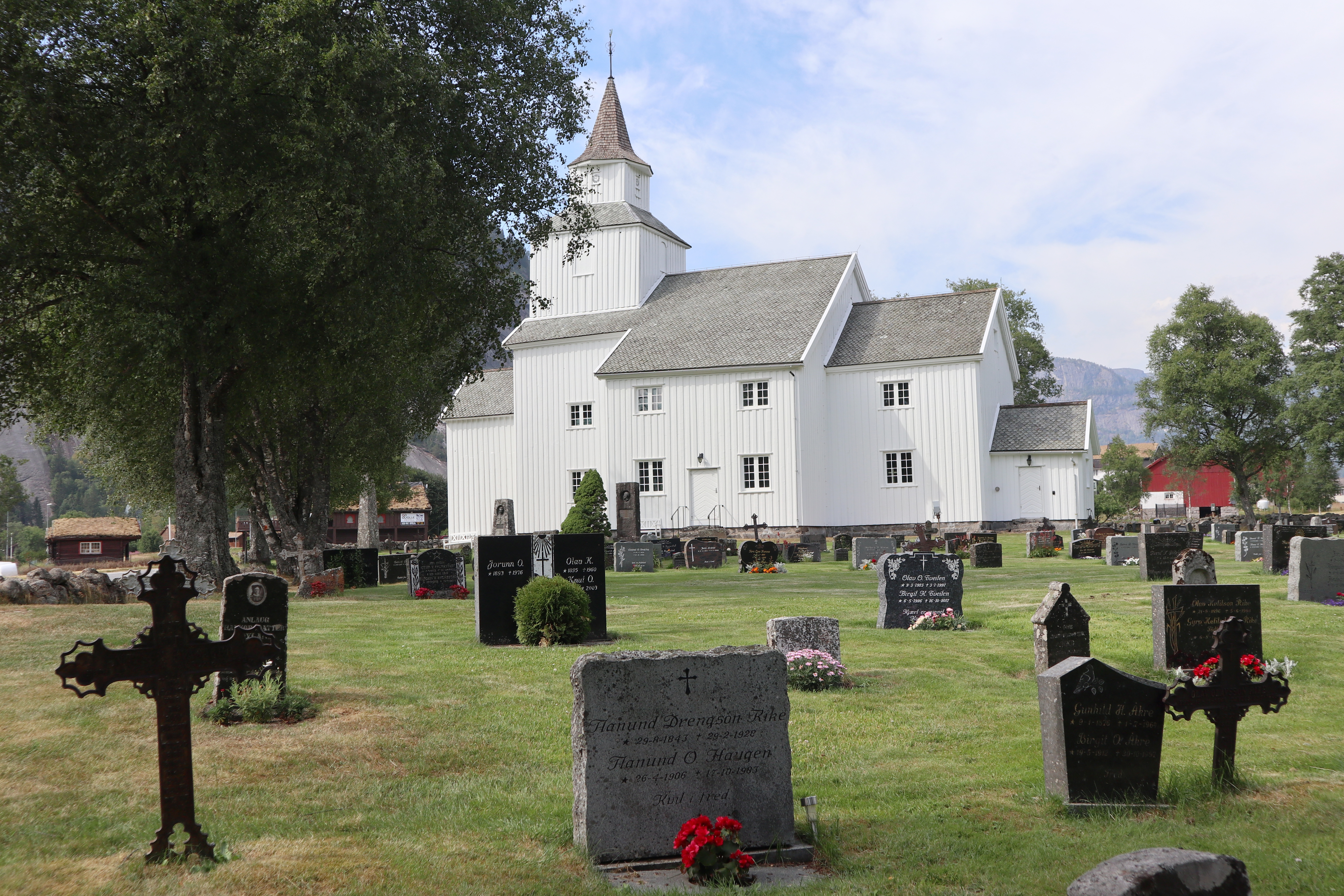

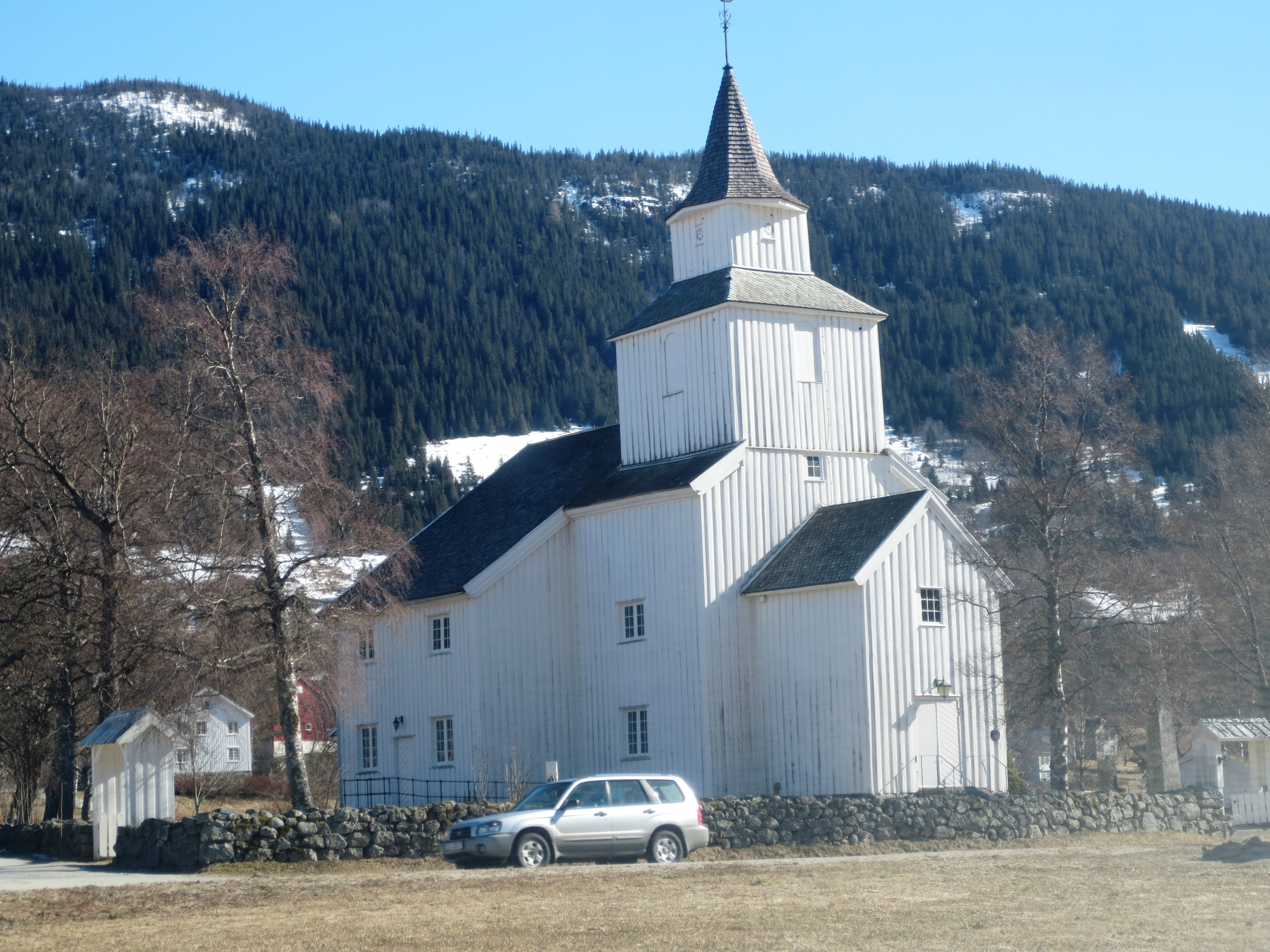

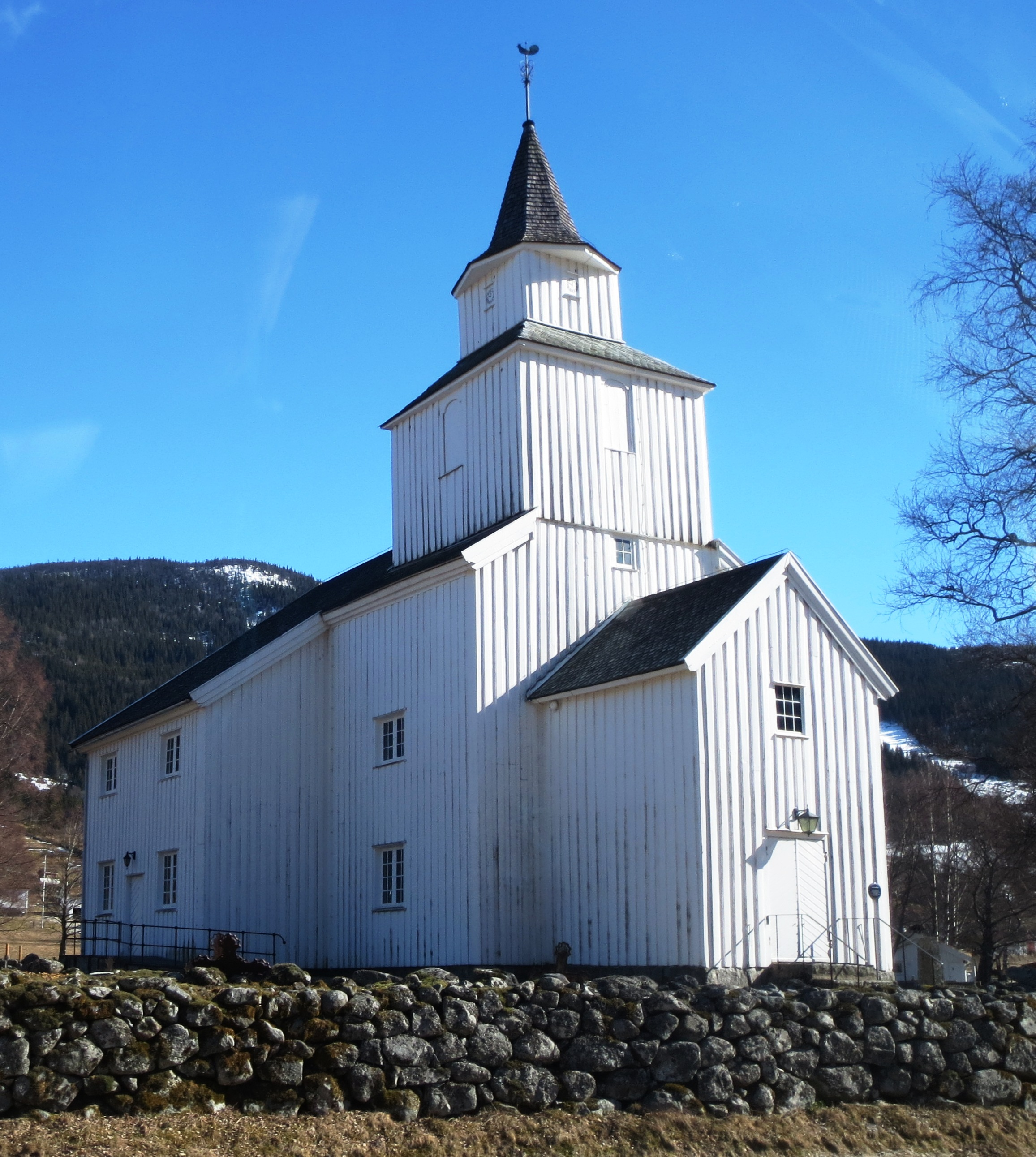

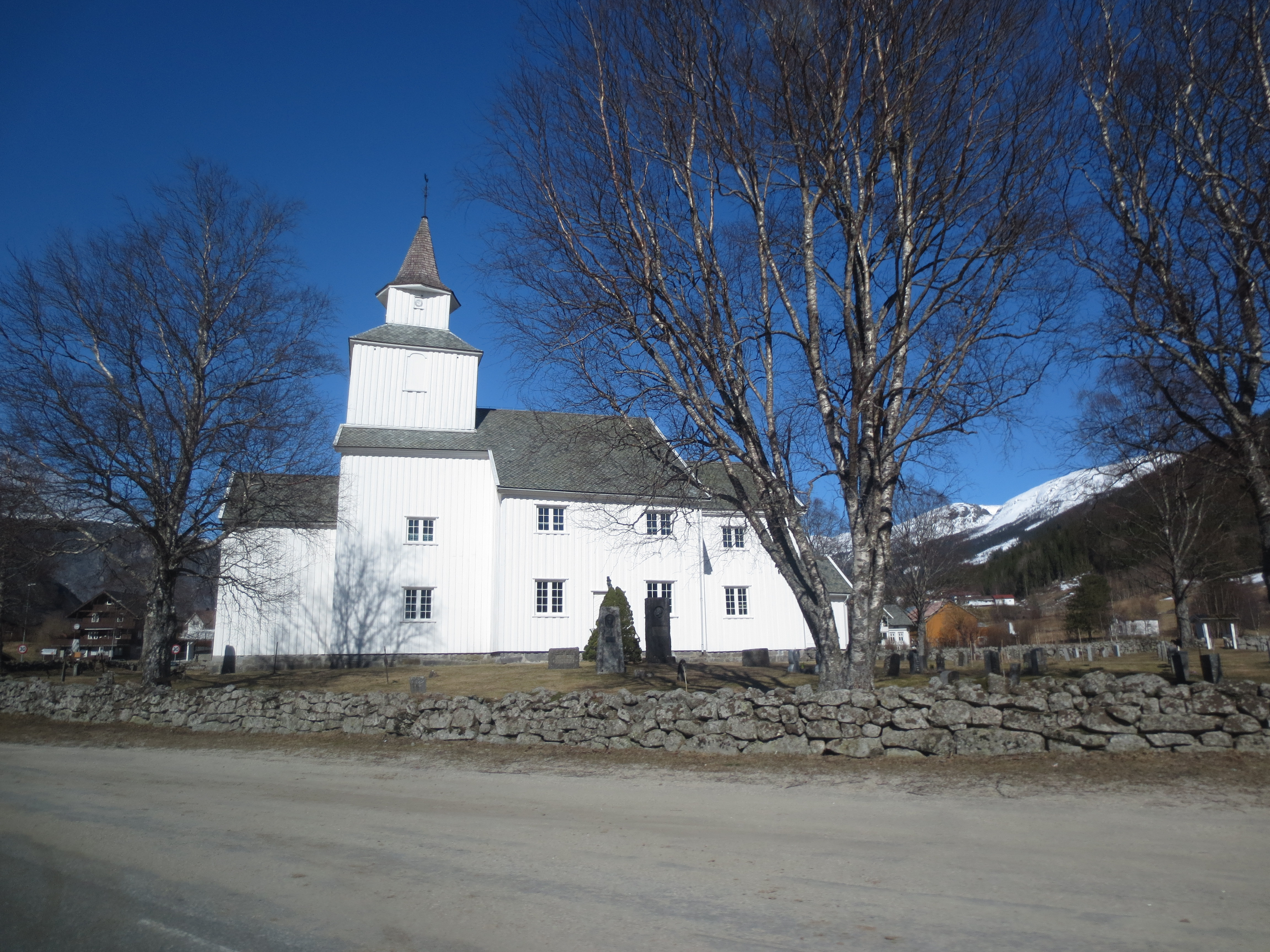

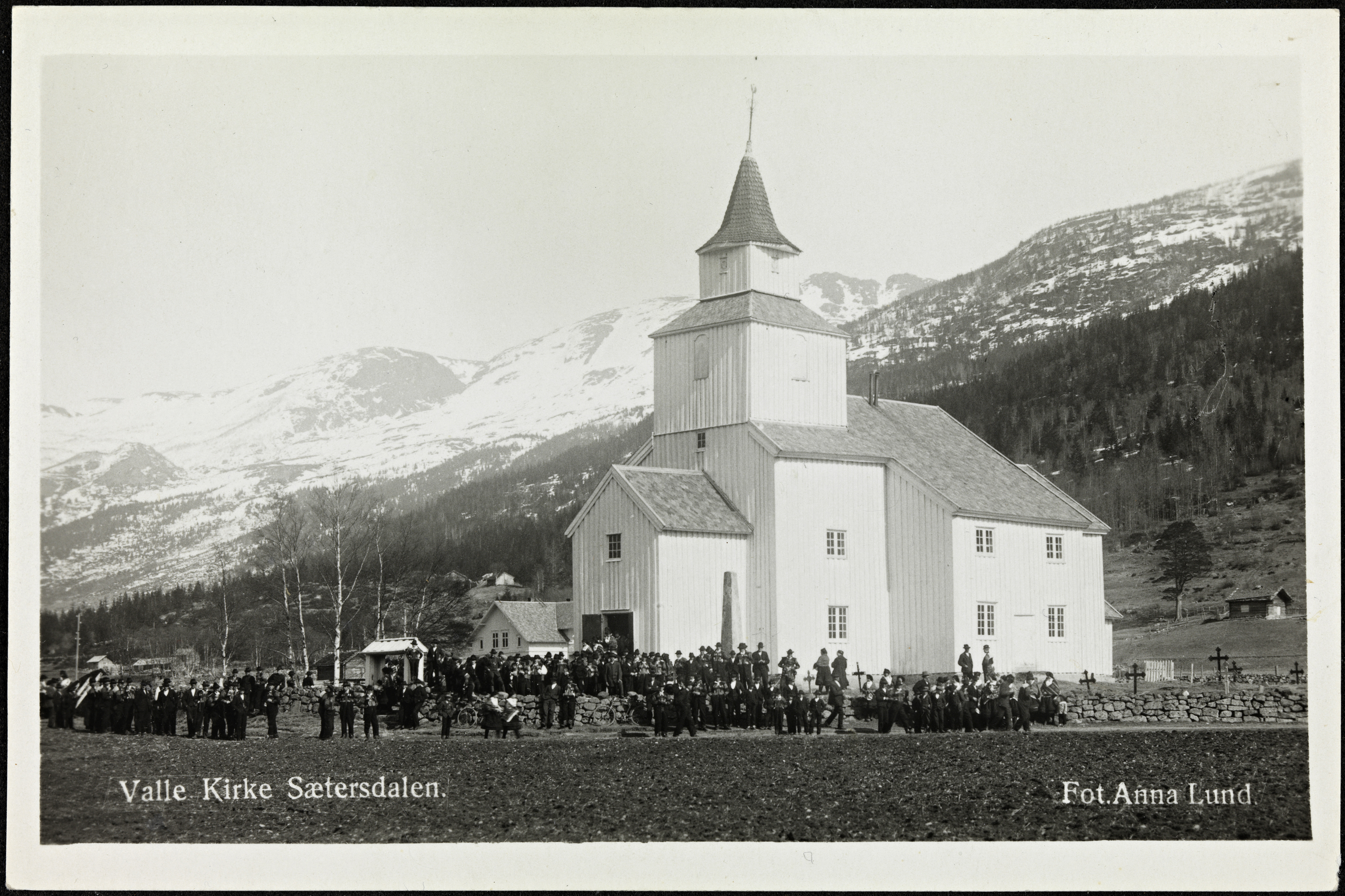

== See also ==
- List of churches in Agder og Telemark
