= Ole Knudsen Tvedten =

Norwegian politician

- Born: 1757/58; Valle, Norway
- Died: 5 October 1837
- Occupations: farmer and district sheriff

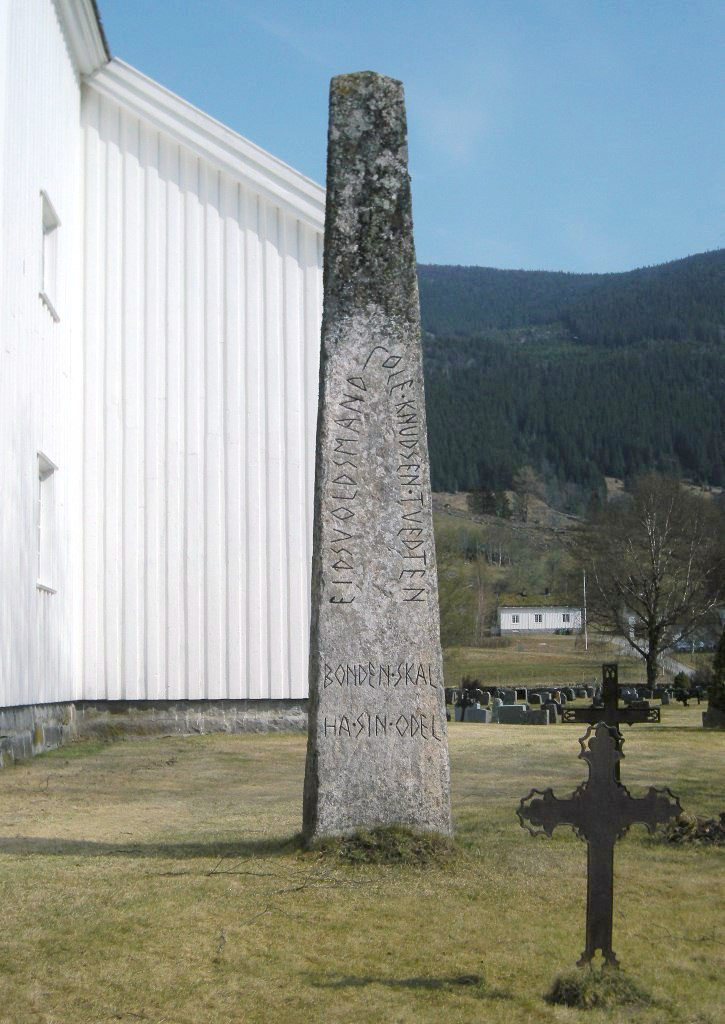
Memorial of Tvedten outside Valle Church

Ole Knudsen Tvedten (1757/58 – 5 October 1837) was a Norwegian farmer and district sheriff. He served as a representative at the Norwegian Constituent Assembly in 1814.

Ole Knudsen Tvedten was born in Valle in Nedenes county, Norway. From 1785, he served as bailiff and later district sheriff until his death. In 1783, he married Gyro Gunnufsdotter Kvestad (1764-1822) and in 1788 he took over his parents’ farm, Nordigard Tveiten in traditional district of Setesdal. The couple had seven children. Following the death of his first wife in 1822, he was married to her cousin Margit Olsdotter Harstad (1804-185) with whom he had five children.

He represented the Råbyggelaget district of Agder at the Norwegian Constituent Assembly in 1814, together with Thomas Bryn and Even Torkildsen Lande. At Eidsvoll, he supported inheritance rights and the side of the independence party (Selvstendighetspartiet) in the negotiations.

His former home in Valle has been preserved and is open to the public. Tveitetunet is owned and operated by the Setesdal Museum (Setesdalsmuseet).

== Related reading ==
- Holme, Jørn (2014) De kom fra alle kanter - Eidsvollsmennene og deres hus (Oslo: Cappelen Damm) ISBN 978-82-02-44564-5
