= Skammevarden =

Mountain in Agder, Norway

Highest point
- Elevation: 1,418 m (4,652 ft)
- Prominence: 129 m (423 ft)
- Parent peak: Urdalsknuten
- Isolation: 8.6 km (5.3 mi)
- Coordinates: 59°13′29″N 7°15′01″E

Geography
- Location: Agder, Norway
- Parent range: Setesdalsheiene

Skammevarden is a mountain in Valle Municipality in Agder county, Norway. The 1,418-metre (4,652 ft) tall mountain has a topographic prominence of 129 metres (423 ft) and it is the 15th highest mountain in Agder county. It is located in the Setesdalsheiene mountains, about 16 kilometres (9.9 mi) west of the village of Valle and about the same distance south of the village of Bykle.

== See also ==
- List of mountains of Norway
