= Urdalsknuten =

Mountain in Agder, Norway

- Urddalsknuten; Urdalsnuten

Highest point
- Elevation: 1,434 m (4,705 ft)
- Prominence: 494 m (1,621 ft)
- Parent peak: Galdhøpiggen
- Isolation: 29.9 km (18.6 mi) to Snjoheinuten
- Coordinates: 59°09′50″N 7°09′27″E

Geography
- Location: Agder, Norway
- Parent range: Setesdalsheiene
- Topo map: 1413 III Rosskreppfjorden

Urdalsknuten is a mountain that lies on the border of Sirdal Municipality and Valle Municipality in Agder county, Norway. The 1,434-metre (4,705 ft) mountain is located in the Setesdalsheiene mountain range. The mountain lies about 22 kilometres (14 mi) west of the village of Valle. The lakes Botnsvatnet, Kolsvatnet, and Rosskreppfjorden surround the mountain to the northeast and south and the mountain Bergeheii lies directly to the north.

== See also ==
- List of mountains of Norway
