= Rygnestadtunet =

Museum in Valle, Norway

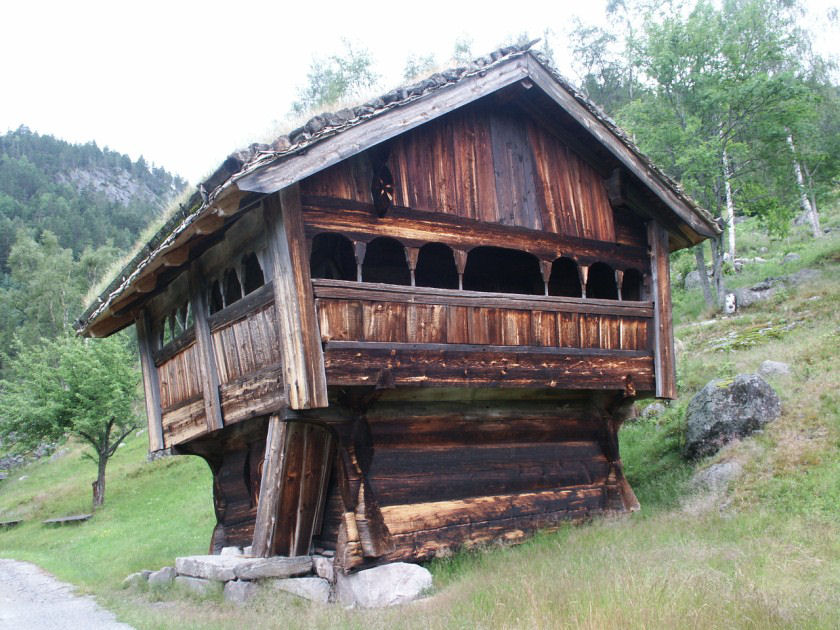
- View of the Rygnestadloftet
- Established: 1940
- Location: Valle Municipality, Norway
- Coordinates: 59.2629°N 07.4896°E
- Type: Open-air museum
- Owner: Setesdal Museum
- Website: setesdalsmuseet.no

Rygnestadtunet is an open-air museum in Valle Municipality in Agder county, Norway. It is located at the Nordigard farm in northern part of the village of Rygnestad in the Setesdal region, near the junction of the Norwegian National Road 9 and Norwegian County Road 45, about 9 kilometres (5.6 mi) north of the village of Valle. The farm museum today looks exactly as it did when it was deserted in 1919. The farm was legally protected in 1923, it was purchased by the Setesdal Museum in 1938, and it was opened to the public as a museum in 1940. Excavations in the area indicate that the site has been populated since at least 900 AD.

== Buildings ==
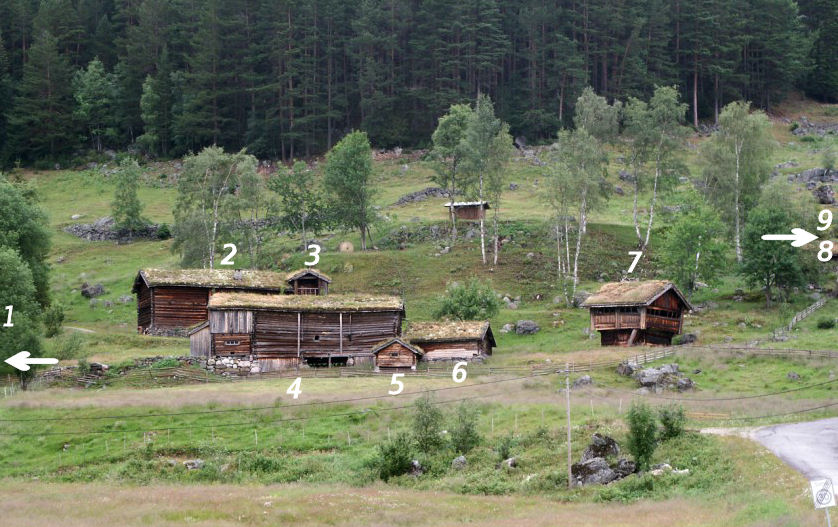
Map of Rygnestadtunet with numbered buildings

Rygnestadtunet is an authentic farmyard consisting of a brook mill (1), farmhouse (2), three-story storehouse ("loft") (3), barn and stable (4), sheephouse (5), barn (6), storehouse on pillars ("loft") (7), blacksmiths workshop (8), and sauna (9). (See the adjacent picture for view of each building.) The custom of building a separate house for each purpose was common in the Setesdal valley until the beginning of the World War II. The museum farmyard only includes the old farmyard, which the newer Nordigard farmyard is situated just below the old one that is now a museum.

=== Rygnestadloftet ===
The most noted of all the buildings is Rygnestadloftet, a storehouse on pillars, built in two stories by Vonde-Åsmund (Åsmund the Evil) (1540–1596) in 1590. Rygnestadloftet is highly valued for its fine proportions, its good craftsmanship, and use of good materials. The cog-joint timber has considerable dimensions. The width of one timber log is enough for the height of the entrance door.

According to tradition, Rygnestaloftet was also designed for defense, and it has served its purpose on some occasions. On the ground floor, there is a little shutter covering an opening leading to an escape tunnel ending in a grove of trees about 10 metres (33 ft) up the hill. The ground floor was used for storing food supplies and there is also a bed. The second floor was used for clothes, textiles, and valuables, and it had an outside balcony. On the rear of the building, there was a so-called "secret" outhouse, ending on the open ground below. In Setesdal, there is no other known example of a similar construction.

=== Farmhouse ===
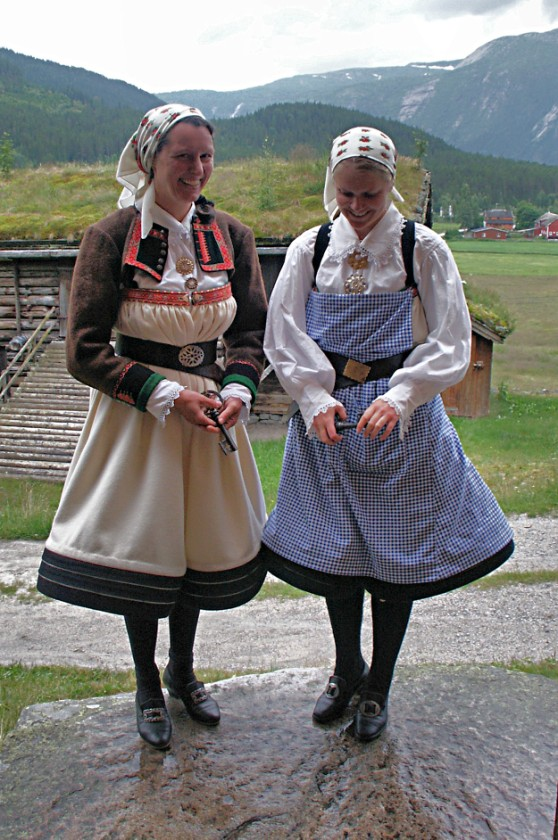
Local everyday folk costumes of the Setesdalsbunad

The farmhouse, or "stoga" (a local expression), has two main areas inside. To the left of the main farmhouse entrance, there is the "gammelstog" (literally: "old" stoga) which is a large open room with a central hearth, complete with original furniture and decoration. The timber logs date from before the black plague of 1349-1350 or possibly from the 13th century. To the right of the farmhouse entrance is the "nystog" (literally: "new" stoga). The "nystog" was used for everyday life and some lighter cooking, while "gammelstog" served as a scullery. Both rooms were used for sleeping. The "nystog" was more recently rebuilt and fitted with fireplace and chimney. The sturdy chimney made it possible to build another storey on above this room. In the front of the building, there originally was an external balcony, but it is no longer there. To make the roof ridge on a level and make it possible to have room for the staircase, the headroom in the "gammelstog" was raised accordingly.

=== Old loft ===
The "trihågloptet" is a unique construction for the area. Its name is a local expression meaning "the three-story storehouse". As the name indicates, it has three stories, but the storehouses built on pillars such as this were always built with two stories, which makes this one unique. The "trihågloptet" was built from the top downwards. The third story was built first (on pillars) using timber with cog joints. It was built on cantilevered logs protruding from the second storey of the adjacent farmhouse. Later on, presumably after a short time, the two lower stories were added beneath it, however that addition was built using lighter construction without cog joints. The ground floor room has beds connected to the wall, but was otherwise used as storage for food and clothes.

=== Other buildings ===
The other farm buildings on the site include the little water mill, barn and stable, sheep shed, and cow shed were all built principally in the 19th century. The cow shed and the sheep shed are located close to the fodder outlet on the left side of the barn. Just after the turn of the century, the buildings underwent some modernization. Another storey was added to the barn and the barn was expanded so that it was joined with the nearby stable. Traces from the old ways of operation are clearly visible in the buildings.

Buildings like the blacksmith's workshop and the sauna were both located at some distance from the other buildings due to the inherent risk a spreading fire. The sauna was also used for drying grain and smoking meat.

=== Recycling of older building parts ===
Both the farmhouse and the storehouse were built or rebuilt using old timbers that are assumed to come from the old stave church that once stood in Nomeland. That church was demolished around the same time that the farmhouse was built.
