= Even Torkildsen Lande =

Norwegian politician (1758–1833)

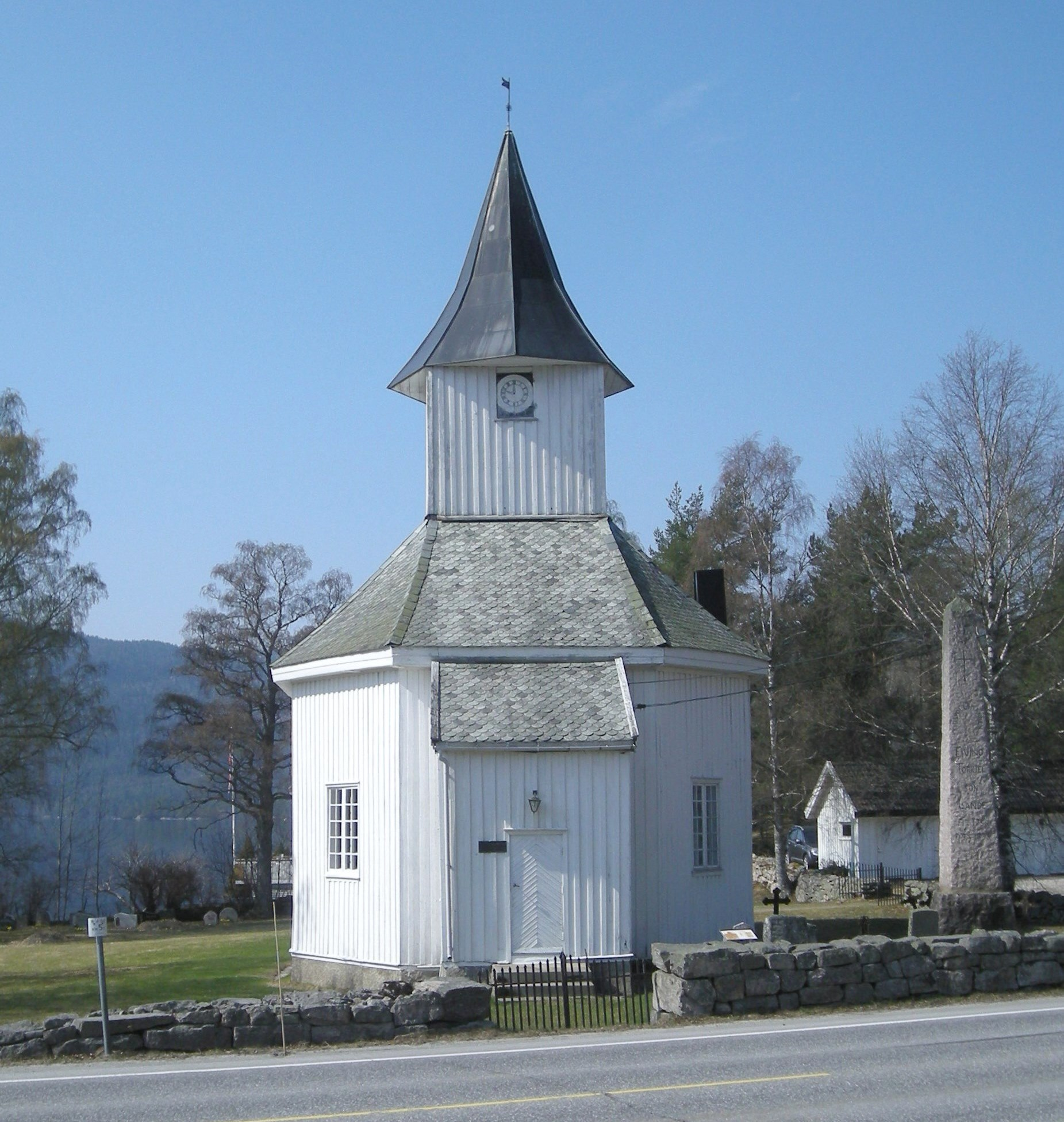
Årdal Church in Bygland. The memorial on right honors Even Thorkildsen Lande, who served as a representative at the Norwegian Constituent Assembly in 1814

Even Torkildsen Lande (1758 – 9 May 1833) was a Norwegian farmer and blacksmith. He served as a representative at the Norwegian Constitutional Assembly.

He was born in Bygland in Nedenes county, Norway. He was raised on the Åsen farm in the traditional rural district of Setesdal. In 1788, he married Gyro Torsdatter Lande. They lived on the Øvre Lande farm in Bygland. He died in 1833 and was buried at Årdal Church in Bygland (Årdal kyrkje i Bygland).

He represented Råbyggelaget (part of the present-day Agder county) at the Norwegian Constituent Assembly in 1814, together with Thomas Bryn and Ole Knudsen Tvedten. He supported the union party (Unionspartiet).
