= Øyarvatn =

Lake in Agder, Norway

- Øyarvatnet
- Interactive map of Øyarvatn
- Location: Valle and Sirdal, Agder
- Coordinates: 59.00355°N 7.10626°E
- Primary inflows: Rosskreppfjorden
- Primary outflows: Kvina river
- Basin countries: Norway
- Max. length: 6.6 kilometres (4.1 mi)
- Max. width: 7 kilometres (4.3 mi)
- Surface area: 8.05 km^{2} (3.11 sq mi)
- Shore length^{1}: 36.51 kilometres (22.69 mi)
- Surface elevation: 837 metres (2,746 ft)
- References: NVE
- ^{1} Shore length is not a well-defined measure.

Øyarvatn is a lake in Agder county, Norway. It sits on the border between Valle Municipality and Sirdal Municipality, about 30 kilometres (19 mi) northeast of the village of Lunde in Sirdal Municipality and about 32 kilometres (20 mi) west of Austad in Bygland Municipality. The lake is part of the Kvina river system. It is located just to the south of the lake Rosskreppfjorden, which flows into it. The dam at the south end of the 8.05-square-kilometre (3.11 sq mi) lake keeps it at an elevation of 837 metres (2,746 ft).

== See also ==
- List of lakes in Aust-Agder
- List of lakes in Norway
