= Botnsvatnet =

Lake in Agder, Norway

- Botsvatnet
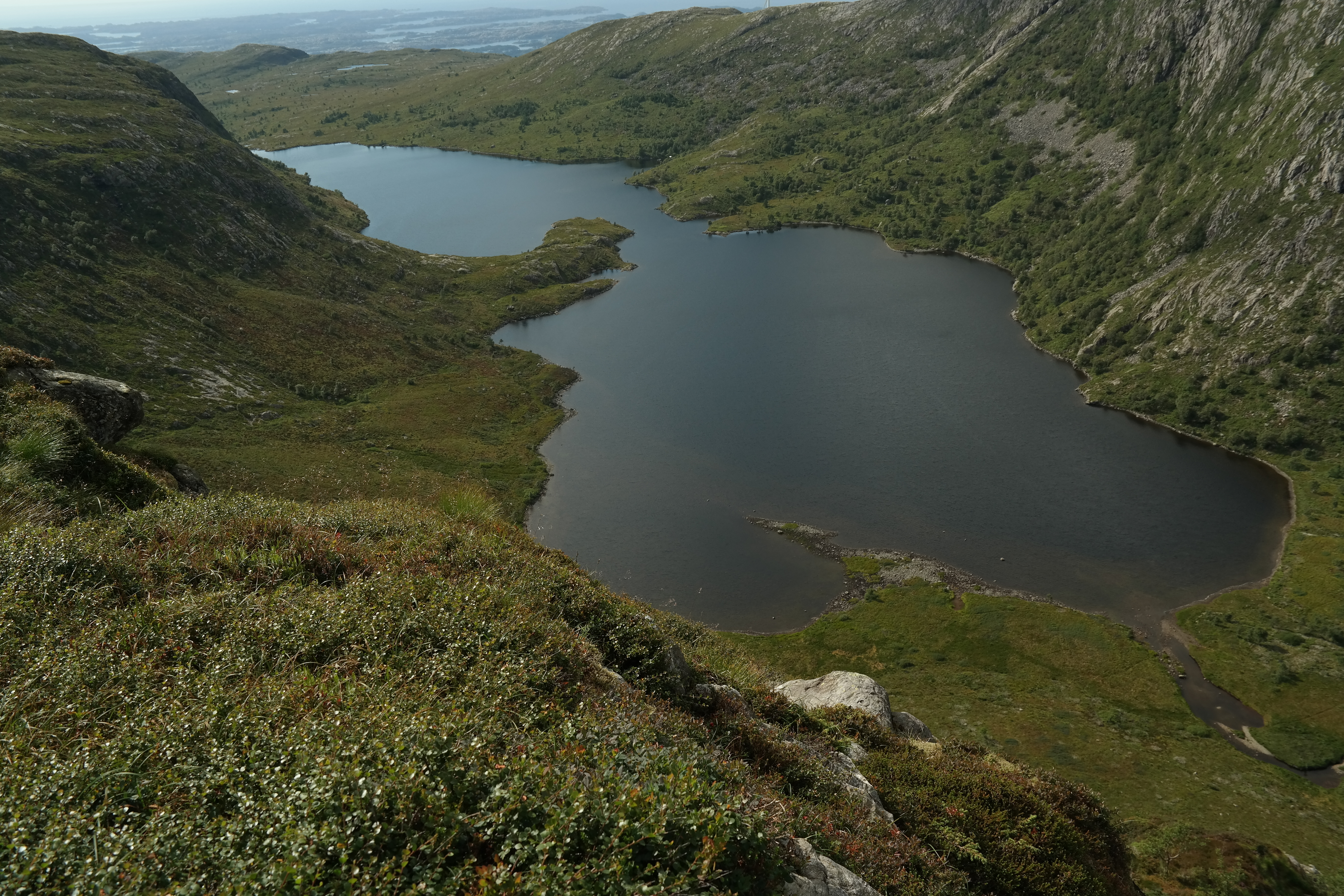
- Interactive map of Botnsvatnet
- Location: Valle Municipality, Agder
- Coordinates: 59.17972°N 7.24488°E
- Primary inflows: Gjuvvassåni river
- Catchment area: Kvina
- Basin countries: Norway
- Max. length: 5.8 kilometres (3.6 mi)
- Max. width: 1.5 kilometres (0.93 mi)
- Surface area: 5.61 km^{2} (2.17 sq mi)
- Shore length^{1}: 25.18 kilometres (15.65 mi)
- Surface elevation: 1,020 metres (3,350 ft)
- References: NVE
- ^{1} Shore length is not a well-defined measure.

Botnsvatnet is a lake in Valle Municipality in Agder county, Norway. The 5.61-square-kilometre (2.17 sq mi) lake is located just north of the lakes Rosskreppfjorden and Kolsvatnet and the mountain Urddalsknuten, and it lies to the southeast of the mountain Bergeheii. The village of Valle is located about 14 kilometres (8.7 mi) to the east of the lake. The lake sits at an elevation of 1,020 metres (3,350 ft) above sea level.

== See also ==
- List of lakes in Aust-Agder
- List of lakes in Norway
