= Valle Municipality =

Municipality in Agder, Norway

Valle Municipality Valle kommune
- Municipality
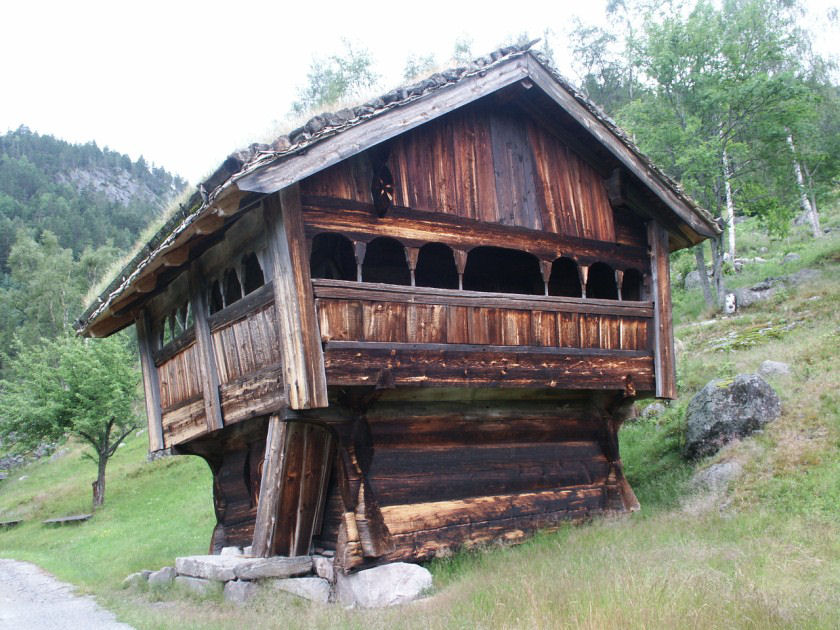
- View of the Rygnestadloftet at the Rygnestadtunet museum

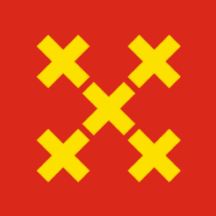
- Flag Coat of arms

- Agder within Norway

- Valle within Agder
- Coordinates: 59.2125°N 07.5358°E
- Country: Norway
- County: Agder
- District: Setesdal
- Established: 1 Jan 1838
  - Created as: Formannskapsdistrikt
- Administrative centre: Valle

Government
  - Mayor (2023): Lars Tarald Myrum (Sp)

Area
  - Total: 1,265.26 km^{2} (488.52 sq mi)
  - Land: 1,129.82 km^{2} (436.23 sq mi)
  - Water: 135.44 km^{2} (52.29 sq mi) 10.7%
  - Rank: #82 in Norway
- Highest elevation: 1,433.42 m (4,702.8 ft)

Population (2026)
  - Total: 1,209
  - Rank: #321 in Norway
  - Density: 1.1/km^{2} (2.8/sq mi)
  - Change (10 years): ▼ −2.7%
- Demonym: Valldøl

Official language
  - Norwegian form: Nynorsk
- Time zone: UTC+01:00 (CET)
  - Summer (DST): UTC+02:00 (CEST)
- ISO 3166 code: NO-4221
- Website: Official website

Valle (Urban East Norwegian: [ˈvɑ̂ɫːə]) is a municipality in Agder county, Norway. It is located in the traditional district of Setesdal. The administrative centre of the municipality is the village of Valle. Other villages in Valle Municipality include Besteland, Brokke, Homme, Hovet, Rygnestad, Rysstad, and Uppstad.

The 1,265.26-square-kilometre (488.52 sq mi) municipality is the 82nd largest by area out of the 357 municipalities in Norway. Valle Municipality is the 321st most populous municipality in Norway with a population of 1,209. The municipality's population density is 1.1 inhabitants per square kilometre (2.8/sq mi) and its population has decreased by 2.7% over the previous 10-year period.

== General information ==
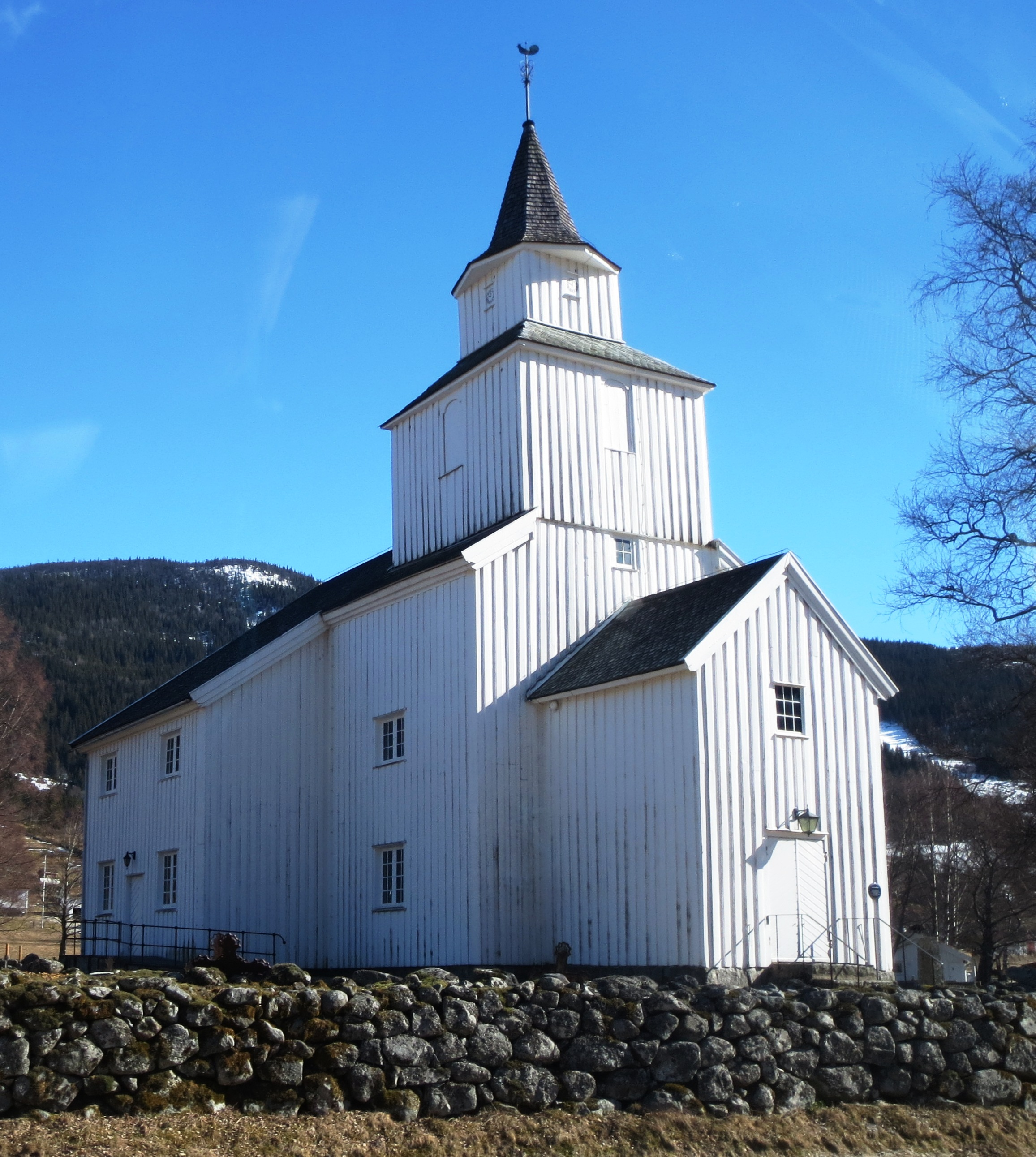
Valle Church

=== Administrative history ===
The prestegjeld of Valle was established as a municipality on 1 January 1838 (see formannskapsdistrikt law). On 1 January 1902, Valle Municipality was divided. The northern half of the municipality (population: 476) became the new Bykle Municipality and the southern half (population: 1,720) remained as a smaller Valle Municipality. On 1 July 1915, Valle Municipality was divided again: the southern half of the municipality (population: 658) became the new Hylestad Municipality and the northern half (population: 1,051) remained as a smaller Valle Municipality.

During the 1960s, there were many municipal mergers across Norway due to the work of the Schei Committee. On 1 January 1962, Hylestad Municipality (population: 662) and Valle Municipality (population: 902) were merged back together to form a new, larger Valle Municipality.

In 2020, there were many municipal and county mergers across Norway due to the work of the Solberg cabinet. Historically, this municipality was part of the old Aust-Agder county. On 1 January 2020, the municipality became a part of the newly-formed Agder county (after Aust-Agder and Vest-Agder counties were merged).

=== Name ===
The municipality (originally the parish) is named after the old Valle farm (Old Norse: Vallar) since the first Valle Church was built there. The name is the genitive case of the word vǫllr which means "meadow" or "field".

=== Coat of arms ===
The coat of arms was granted on 11 May 1984. The official blazon is "Gules, five saltires couped Or in saltire (Norwegian: På raud grunn fem gull Andreas-krossar, 2-1-2). This means the arms have a red field (background) and the charge is a group of five saltire (St. Andrew's cross). The crosses are couped which means they are cut off or separate and they are laid out in saltire which means they are in the form of an X, in the pattern 2-1-2, together forming a larger cross. The crosses have a tincture of Or which means it is commonly colored yellow, but if it is made out of metal, then gold is used. The design was based on the diagonal beams forming construction and decoration in old Norwegian wooden churches, especially decorating the railings of the second floor balconies. This design was part of the medieval Hylestad Stave Church, located in Rysstad. This pattern is also used in traditional Setesdal sweaters that have long been made and worn in the municipality. The arms were designed by Daniel Rike. The municipal flag has the same design as the coat of arms.

=== Churches ===
The Church of Norway has one parish (sokn) within Valle Municipality. It is part of the Otredal prosti (deanery) in the Diocese of Agder og Telemark.

Churches in Valle Municipality
Parish (sokn)	Church name	Location of the church	Year built
Valle og Hylestad	Hylestad Church	Rysstad	1838
Valle og Hylestad	Valle Church	Valle	1844

== Geography ==
Valle Municipality is bordered to the north by Bykle Municipality (in Agder county) and Tokke Municipality (in Telemark county). To the east, it is bordered by Fyresdal Municipality in Telemark county, to the south it is bordered by Bygland Municipality in Agder county, and to the west it is bordered by Sirdal Municipality, also in Agder county.

Valle lies in the middle of Setesdal, a valley and a traditional district in Agder county that included the municipalities of Bykle, Valle, Bygland, Iveland, and Evje og Hornnes. The Otra river flows from the Hardangervidda plateau in Telemark to the north, through the Setesdal valley (and through Valle), into the sea near the city of Kristiansand.

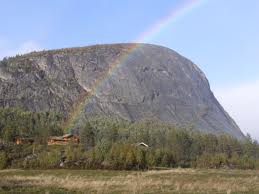
View of the area near Brokkestøyl

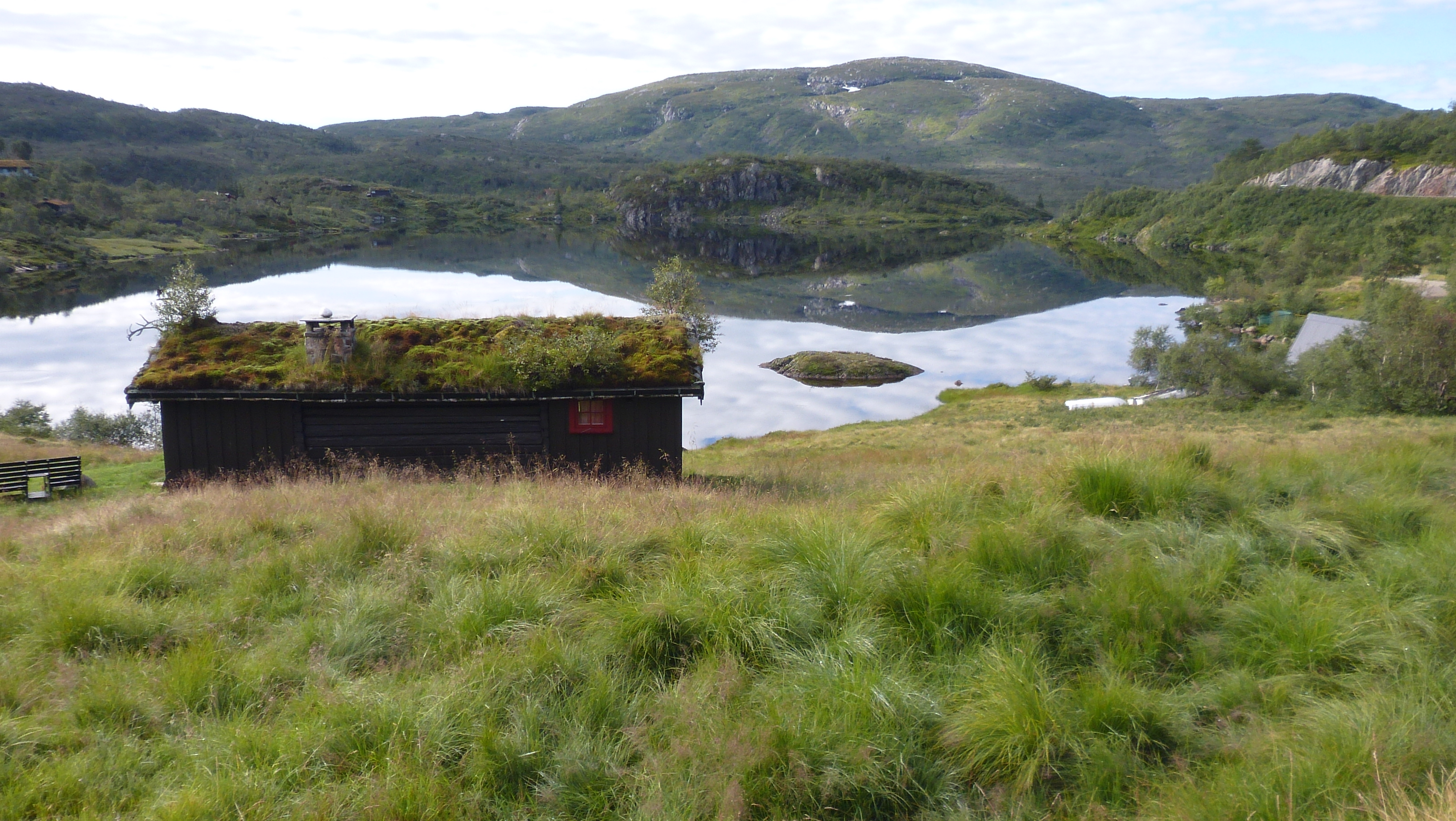
Farmhouse near the lake Mykelvatnet

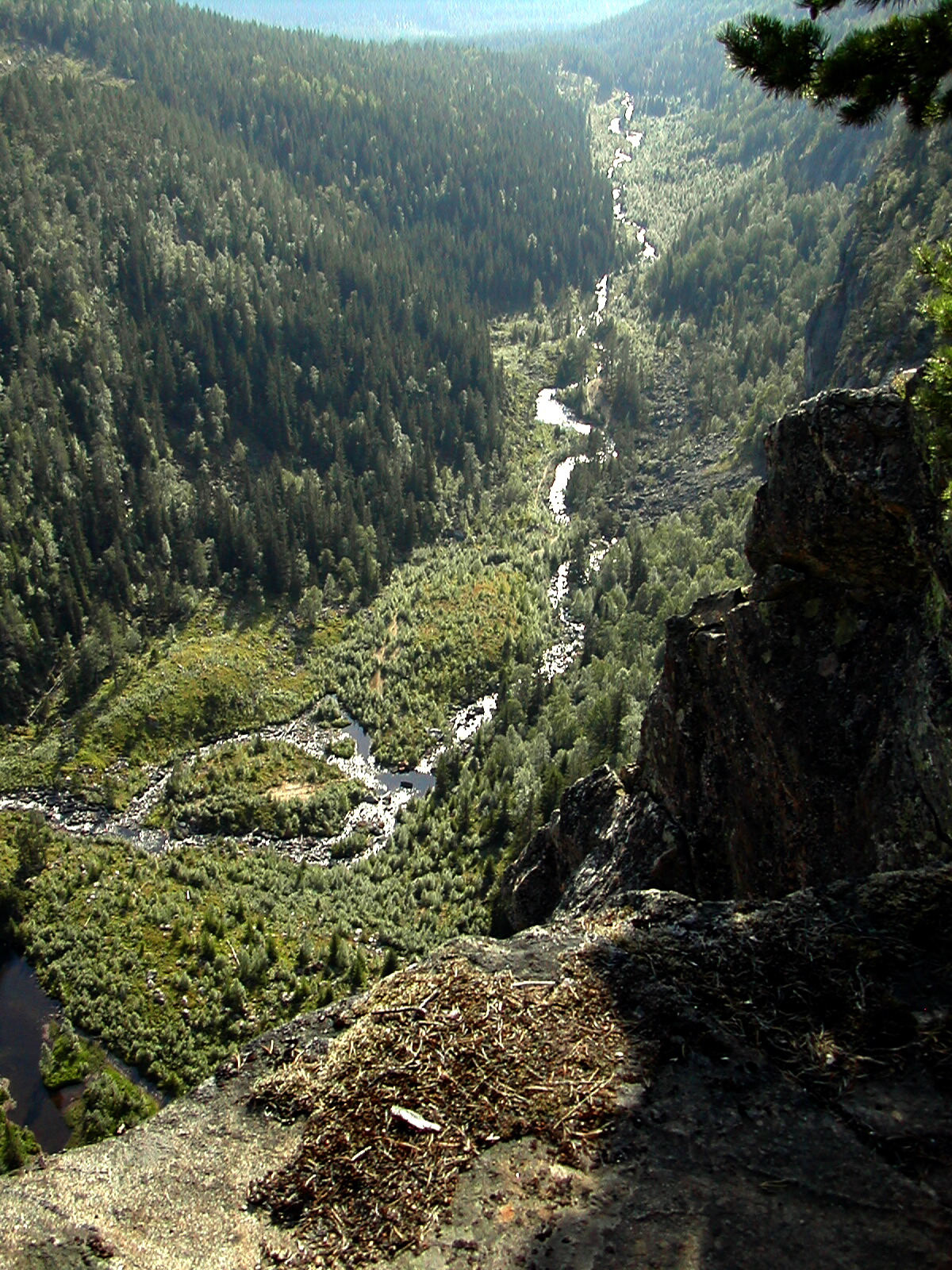
View of the Veiåjuvet canyon

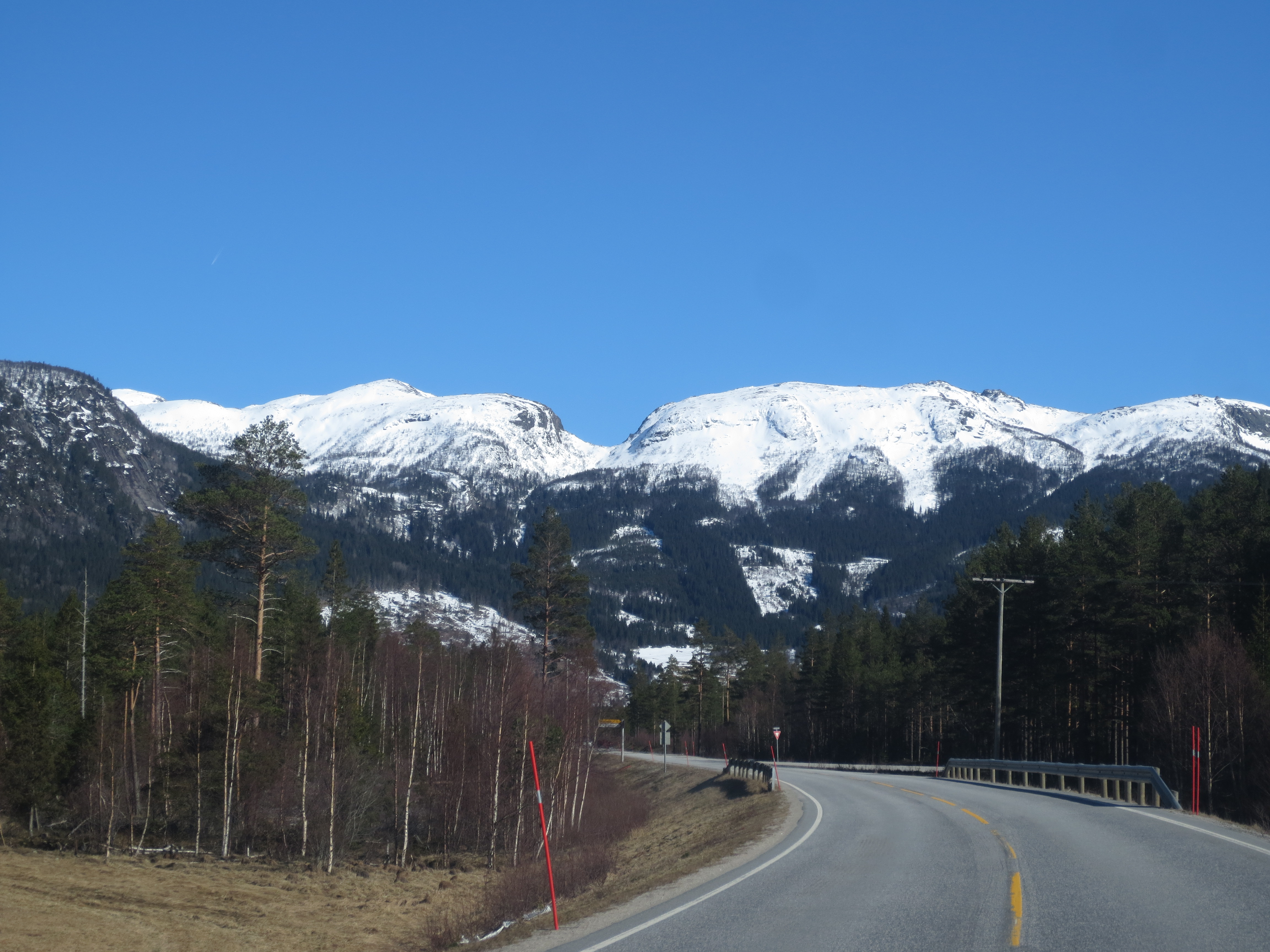
View of the Norwegian National Road 9

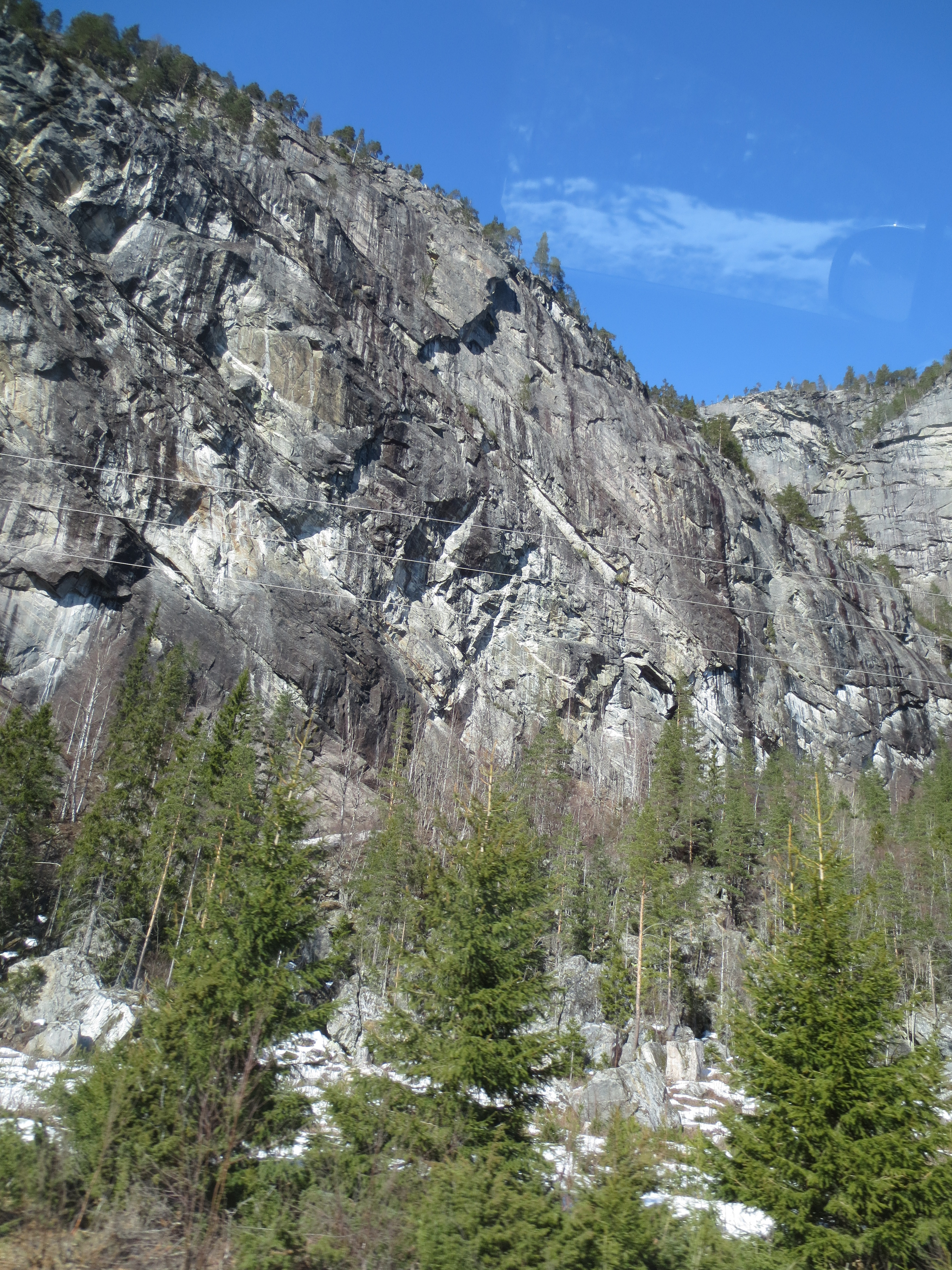
Evangsnuten mountain

Valle Municipality is separated from the neighbouring valleys to the east and west by the large Setesdalsheiene mountain plateaus. Before the valley was linked by road to Kristiansand in the 1840s, people routinely traveled east and west across these moorlands. The highest point in the municipality is the 1,433.42-metre (4,702.8 ft) tall mountain Urdalsknuten, on the border with Sirdal Municipality. Other notable mountains in the municipality include Skammevarden, Bergeheii, Skjerkenuten, and Svarvarnuten.

The high mountains are the starting points for several large rivers including the Kvina and Tovdalselva. Several large lakes are also located in Valle including Botnsvatnet, Kolsvatnet, Rosskreppfjorden, Store Bjørnevatn, Straumsfjorden, and Øyarvatnet. The Hallandsfossen and the Gloppefossen are two larger waterfalls in Valle Municipality.

There are two central population centres in the municipality: Valle and Rysstad. The village of Valle is the site of the municipal administration and Rysstad was the site of the municipal administration in the old Hylestad Municipality which existed until 1962.

== Climate ==
Situated in a long valley at some altitude, Valle has a humid continental climate (Dfb), close to a boreal climate. The driest season is spring, while the wettest is autumn and early winter.

Climate data for Valle 1991-2020 (308 m, avg highs/lows 2012-2025, recording since 1872)
Month	Jan	Feb	Mar	Apr	May	Jun	Jul	Aug	Sep	Oct	Nov	Dec	Year
Mean daily maximum °C (°F)	0 (32)	1.7 (35.1)	5.7 (42.3)	9.7 (49.5)	15.5 (59.9)	19.6 (67.3)	21.2 (70.2)	19.5 (67.1)	15.8 (60.4)	9.6 (49.3)	4.2 (39.6)	1.2 (34.2)	10.3 (50.6)
Daily mean °C (°F)	−3 (27)	−3.1 (26.4)	0 (32)	4.1 (39.4)	8.7 (47.7)	12.7 (54.9)	14.9 (58.8)	13.5 (56.3)	10 (50)	4.8 (40.6)	0.6 (33.1)	−2.8 (27.0)	5.0 (41.1)
Mean daily minimum °C (°F)	−6.8 (19.8)	−6.1 (21.0)	−3.3 (26.1)	−0.6 (30.9)	4 (39)	8.3 (46.9)	10.2 (50.4)	9.1 (48.4)	6.9 (44.4)	2.7 (36.9)	−1.2 (29.8)	−4.8 (23.4)	1.5 (34.7)
Average precipitation mm (inches)	115 (4.5)	73 (2.9)	58 (2.3)	49 (1.9)	68 (2.7)	74 (2.9)	89 (3.5)	117 (4.6)	108 (4.3)	132 (5.2)	122 (4.8)	117 (4.6)	1,122 (44.2)
Source 1: Yr.no statistics
Source 2: Seklima

== History ==
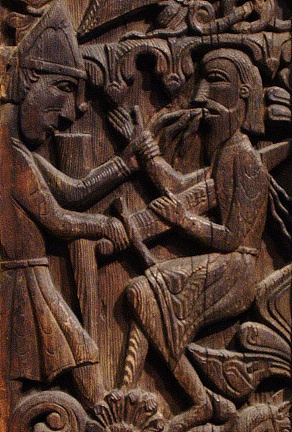
Sigurd Fåvnesbane featured on the portal plank from Hylestad Stave Church

The Hylestad Stave Church, constructed in the 12th century in Setesdal was demolished in the 19th century. Its portal, with several carved scenes illustrating the legend of Sigurd Fåvnesbane (Sigurd the Dragon-slayer), is on display at University Museum of Antiquities in Oslo (Universitetets Oldsaksamling, Historisk Museum, Oslo). Sigurd's slaying of Fafnir with his sword Gram is described in the Prose Edda of Snorri Sturluson and the Volsunga saga as well as alluded to in Beowulf and Njáls saga.

Rygnestadtunet is a historical family farm in Rygnestad, built by Vonde-Åsmund (Åsmund the Evil) in the mid-1500s. Today, it is an open-air museum that is part of the Setesdal Museum. The farm was sold to museum by Gyro Rygnestad and her family in the 1920s. Today, it is represented to visitors exactly as it was in 1919. Grave findings around the farm indicate that the site was settled as early as 900 AD. Another farm museum in Valle is Tveitetunet. There are also several old silver smithies and barns that can be seen in Rysstad.

Historically, Valle was very isolated from other parts of Setesdal. To get from Valle to the Bykle area to the north, residents had to traverse the Byklestigen pass along the river Otra. The pass was a torturous trail up a steep cliff face. Until the 1870s, it was the only route to travel from Valle in the middle Setesdal valley to Bykle in the north. It runs above the river Otra and was the site of numerous accidents on the hazardous route. Today, the Norwegian National Road 9 passes through the mountain in a tunnel providing a fast, easy route north.

Between Valle in Setesdal on the western side of the mountains and Fyresdal on the eastern side, one finds a medieval trail over the high plateau that priests and bishops used in order to get between the counties of Agder and Telemark. This track is named Bispevegen ("Bishop's Road") and every year a march called "Bispevegmarsjen" ("The Bishop's Road March") starts at Kleivgrend in Fyresdal.

Traditional music is popular in this region. There is a Jew's harp monument in Valle. (Photo)

== Government ==
Valle Municipality is responsible for primary education (through 10th grade), outpatient health services, senior citizen services, welfare and other social services, zoning, economic development, and municipal roads and utilities. The municipality is governed by a municipal council of directly elected representatives. The mayor is indirectly elected by a vote of the municipal council. The municipality is under the jurisdiction of the Agder District Court and the Agder Court of Appeal.

=== Municipal council ===
The municipal council (Kommunestyre) of Valle Municipality is made up of 15 representatives that are elected to four-year terms. The tables below show the current and historical composition of the council by political party.

Valle kommunestyre 2023–2027
Party name (in Nynorsk)	Number of representatives
Labour Party (Arbeidarpartiet)	3
Conservative Party (Høgre)	3
Centre Party (Senterpartiet)	5
Local list Valle (Bygdelista Valle)	4
Total number of members:	15

Valle kommunestyre 2019–2023
Party name (in Nynorsk)	Number of representatives
Labour Party (Arbeidarpartiet)	6
Conservative Party (Høgre)	2
Centre Party (Senterpartiet)	6
Liberal Party (Venstre)	1
Total number of members:	15

Valle kommunestyre 2015–2019
Party name (in Nynorsk)	Number of representatives
Labour Party (Arbeidarpartiet)	7
Conservative Party (Høgre)	2
Centre Party (Senterpartiet)	4
Liberal Party (Venstre)	2
Total number of members:	15

Valle kommunestyre 2011–2015
Party name (in Nynorsk)	Number of representatives
Labour Party (Arbeidarpartiet)	4
Conservative Party (Høgre)	3
Christian Democratic Party (Kristeleg Folkeparti)	1
Centre Party (Senterpartiet)	6
Liberal Party (Venstre)	1
Total number of members:	15

Valle kommunestyre 2007–2011
Party name (in Nynorsk)	Number of representatives
Labour Party (Arbeidarpartiet)	3
Conservative Party (Høgre)	10
Christian Democratic Party (Kristeleg Folkeparti)	3
Centre Party (Senterpartiet)	5
Total number of members:	21
Note: In the 2007 municipal elections, 48.9% of voters in Valle voted for the Conservative Party, the highest percentage in all of Norway.

Valle kommunestyre 2003–2007
Party name (in Nynorsk)	Number of representatives
Labour Party (Arbeidarpartiet)	5
Conservative Party (Høgre)	6
Christian Democratic Party (Kristeleg Folkeparti)	3
Centre Party (Senterpartiet)	7
Total number of members:	21

Valle kommunestyre 1999–2003
Party name (in Nynorsk)	Number of representatives
Labour Party (Arbeidarpartiet)	6
Conservative Party (Høgre)	2
Christian Democratic Party (Kristeleg Folkeparti)	5
Centre Party (Senterpartiet)	8
Total number of members:	21

Valle kommunestyre 1995–1999
Party name (in Nynorsk)	Number of representatives
Labour Party (Arbeidarpartiet)	6
Conservative Party (Høgre)	1
Christian Democratic Party (Kristeleg Folkeparti)	2
Centre Party (Senterpartiet)	10
Local list (Bygdelista)	2
Total number of members:	21

Valle kommunestyre 1991–1995
Party name (in Nynorsk)	Number of representatives
Labour Party (Arbeidarpartiet)	6
Progress Party (Framstegspartiet)	1
Conservative Party (Høgre)	1
Christian Democratic Party (Kristeleg Folkeparti)	3
Centre Party (Senterpartiet)	8
Local list (Bygdelista)	2
Total number of members:	21

Valle kommunestyre 1987–1991
Party name (in Nynorsk)	Number of representatives
Labour Party (Arbeidarpartiet)	8
Conservative Party (Høgre)	2
Christian Democratic Party (Kristeleg Folkeparti)	2
Centre Party (Senterpartiet)	9
Total number of members:	21

Valle kommunestyre 1983–1987
Party name (in Nynorsk)	Number of representatives
Labour Party (Arbeidarpartiet)	7
Conservative Party (Høgre)	3
Christian Democratic Party (Kristeleg Folkeparti)	3
Centre Party (Senterpartiet)	7
Socialist Left Party (Sosialistisk Venstreparti)	1
Total number of members:	21

Valle kommunestyre 1979–1983
Party name (in Nynorsk)	Number of representatives
Labour Party (Arbeidarpartiet)	7
Conservative Party (Høgre)	3
Christian Democratic Party (Kristeleg Folkeparti)	2
Centre Party (Senterpartiet)	8
Socialist Left Party (Sosialistisk Venstreparti)	1
Total number of members:	21

Valle kommunestyre 1975–1979
Party name (in Nynorsk)	Number of representatives
Labour Party (Arbeidarpartiet)	6
Christian Democratic Party (Kristeleg Folkeparti)	3
New People's Party (Nye Folkepartiet)	2
Centre Party (Senterpartiet)	9
Socialist Left Party (Sosialistisk Venstreparti)	1
Total number of members:	21

Valle kommunestyre 1971–1975
Party name (in Nynorsk)	Number of representatives
Labour Party (Arbeidarpartiet)	7
Christian Democratic Party (Kristeleg Folkeparti)	2
Centre Party (Senterpartiet)	9
Liberal Party (Venstre)	3
Total number of members:	21

Valle kommunestyre 1967–1971
Party name (in Nynorsk)	Number of representatives
Labour Party (Arbeidarpartiet)	8
Christian Democratic Party (Kristeleg Folkeparti)	2
Centre Party (Senterpartiet)	9
Liberal Party (Venstre)	2
Total number of members:	21

Valle kommunestyre 1963–1967
Party name (in Nynorsk)	Number of representatives
Labour Party (Arbeidarpartiet)	7
Christian Democratic Party (Kristeleg Folkeparti)	2
Centre Party (Senterpartiet)	9
Local List(s) (Lokale lister)	3
Total number of members:	21

Valle heradsstyre 1959–1963
Party name (in Nynorsk)	Number of representatives
Labour Party (Arbeidarpartiet)	5
Christian Democratic Party (Kristeleg Folkeparti)	3
Centre Party (Senterpartiet)	9
Total number of members:	17

Valle heradsstyre 1955–1959
Party name (in Nynorsk)	Number of representatives
Labour Party (Arbeidarpartiet)	5
Christian Democratic Party (Kristeleg Folkeparti)	3
Farmers' Party (Bondepartiet)	9
Total number of members:	17

Valle heradsstyre 1951–1955
Party name (in Nynorsk)	Number of representatives
Labour Party (Arbeidarpartiet)	5
Christian Democratic Party (Kristeleg Folkeparti)	2
Farmers' Party (Bondepartiet)	8
Local List(s) (Lokale lister)	1
Total number of members:	16

Valle heradsstyre 1947–1951
Party name (in Nynorsk)	Number of representatives
Labour Party (Arbeidarpartiet)	5
Christian Democratic Party (Kristeleg Folkeparti)	2
Joint List(s) of Non-Socialist Parties (Borgarlege Felleslister)	9
Total number of members:	16

Valle heradsstyre 1945–1947
Party name (in Nynorsk)	Number of representatives
Labour Party (Arbeidarpartiet)	7
Christian Democratic Party (Kristeleg Folkeparti)	2
Joint List(s) of Non-Socialist Parties (Borgarlege Felleslister)	7
Total number of members:	16

Valle heradsstyre 1937–1941*
Party name (in Nynorsk)	Number of representatives
Labour Party (Arbeidarpartiet)	5
Joint list of the Farmers' Party (Bondepartiet) and the Liberal Party (Venstre)	10
Joint List(s) of Non-Socialist Parties (Borgarlege Felleslister)	1
Total number of members:	16
Note: Due to the German occupation of Norway during World War II, no elections were held for new municipal councils until after the war ended in 1945.

=== Mayors ===
The mayor (Nynorsk: ordførar) of Valle Municipality is the political leader of the municipality and the chairperson of the municipal council. The following people have held this position:

- 1838–1844: Johan Koren Dahl
- 1844–1856: Olav H. Kyrvestad
- 1856–1857: Tor B. Homme
- 1857–1863: Torleiv Bjugson Aakre
- 1863–1865: Olav Olsson Aamli
- 1865–1880: Peder Blom
- 1880–1885: Knut Olsson Løyland
- 1889–1895: Olav Pålsson Kjelleberg
- 1895–1907: Hallvard K. Kvassaker
- 1908–1916: Olav M. Harstad
- 1917–1922: Knut K. Løyland
- 1923–1931: Tarald Å. Åmli
- 1932–1945: Knut O. Løyland
- 1945–1945: Aasulv K. Austad
- 1945–1945: Olav D. Rike
- 1945–1945: Tarald Å. Åmli
- 1946–1947: Knut O. Rike
- 1948–1951: Torgeir Sagneskar
- 1952–1957: Knut O. Løyland
- 1958–1961: Daniel A. Homme
- 1962–1963: Torjus Nomeland
- 1964–1975: Dreng Brokka (Sp)
- 1976–1987: Gudmund Åkre (Sp)
- 1988–1991: Pål Åmlid (Ap)
- 1992–1999: Tarald Myrum (Sp)
- 1999–2007: Steinar Kyrvestad (Sp)
- 2007–2011: Bjørgulv S. Lund (H)
- 2011–2015: Tarald Myrum (Sp)
- 2015–2023: Steinar Kyrvestad (Ap)
- 2023–present: Lars Tarald Myrum (Sp)

== Notable people ==
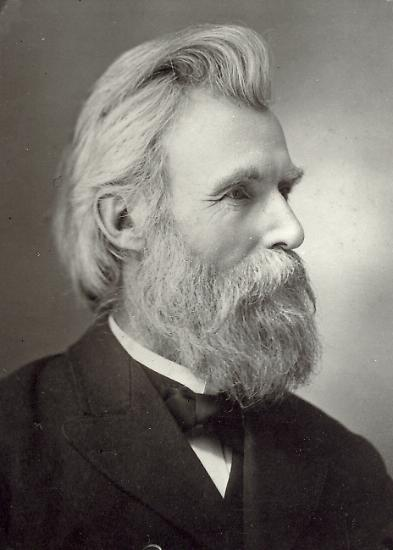
Bjug Harstad, 1897

- Ole Knudsen Tvedten (1757/8 in Valle – 1837), a farmer, district sheriff, and representative at the Norwegian Constituent Assembly in 1814
- Bjug Harstad (1848 in Setesdal – 1933), a Lutheran pastor whose family emigrated to USA in 1861 and later became the founding president of Pacific Lutheran University
- Aani Aanisson Rysstad (1894 in Valle – 1965), a politician who was mayor of Valle 1934–1937
- Sigurd Helle (1920 in Hylestad – 2013), a topographer and explorer
- Paal-Helge Haugen (born 1945 in Valle), a poet, novelist, dramatist, and children's writer
- Kirsten Bråten Berg (born 1950), a traditional folk singer, silversmith, and government scholar
