= Hylestad Church =

Church in Agder, Norway

- Hylestad kyrkje
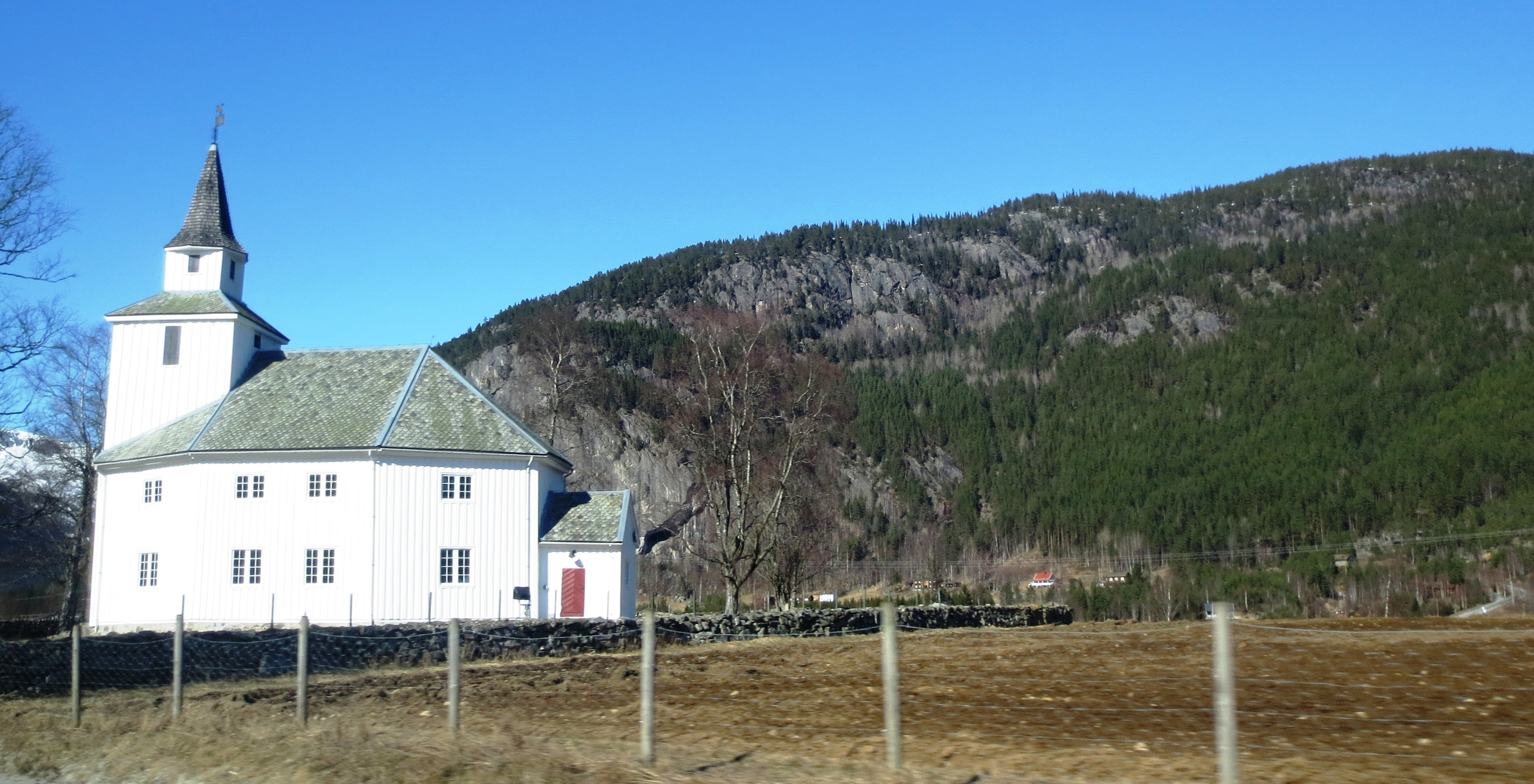
- View of the church
- Hylestad Church
- 59.0954°N 07.5335°E
- Location: Valle Municipality, Agder
- Country: Norway
- Denomination: Church of Norway
- Churchmanship: Evangelical Lutheran

History
- Status: Parish church
- Founded: c. 1200
- Consecrated: 1839

Architecture
- Functional status: Active
- Architect: Hans Linstow
- Architectural type: Octagonal
- Completed: 1838 (188 years ago)

Specifications
- Capacity: 200
- Materials: Wood

Administration
- Diocese: Agder og Telemark
- Deanery: Otredal prosti
- Parish: Valle og Hyllestad
- Norwegian Cultural Heritage Site
- Type: Church
- Status: Listed
- ID: 84685

Hylestad Church (Norwegian: Hylestad kyrkje) is a parish church of the Church of Norway in Valle Municipality in Agder county, Norway. It is located in the village of Rysstad. It is one of the churches for the Valle og Hylestad parish which is part of the Otredal prosti (deanery) in the Diocese of Agder og Telemark. The white, wooden church was built in a octagonal design in 1838 by Anders Thorsen Syrtveit using plans drawn up by the famous architect Hans Linstow. The church seats about 200 people.

== History ==
The earliest existing historical records of the church date back to the year 1328, but it was likely built around the year 1200. The first church in Hylestad was the Hylestad Stave Church which was located at Kyrkjemo in the Bjørgum farm area on the east side of the river Otra, about 900 metres (3,000 ft) to the northwest of the present church site (on the west side of the river). The old stave church was torn down around the year 1664 when the church was over 450 years old. A new log church was built on the same site to replace the old church. Some decorative parts of the old church were saved and reused in the new church. During the demolition of the old church, workers found 24 coins underneath the church that were dated back to the 1200s.

In the 1838, the church was no longer in good condition and it was also too small for the parish, so it was decided to tear down the old church and build a new one. Since the majority of the municipal residents lived on the west side and the newly constructed road through Valle (now Norwegian National Road 9) was also built on the west side of the river, it was decided that the new church would also be built on the west side, right alongside the road. So the old church was torn down and the new one was built at Rysstad about 900 metres (3,000 ft) to the southeast of the old site. Some of the items from the old church such as the churchyard wall and the main gate were transported across the river ice during the winter from the old church site to the new site. Much of the old interior artwork and the altarpiece were also reused in the new church.

== Media gallery ==
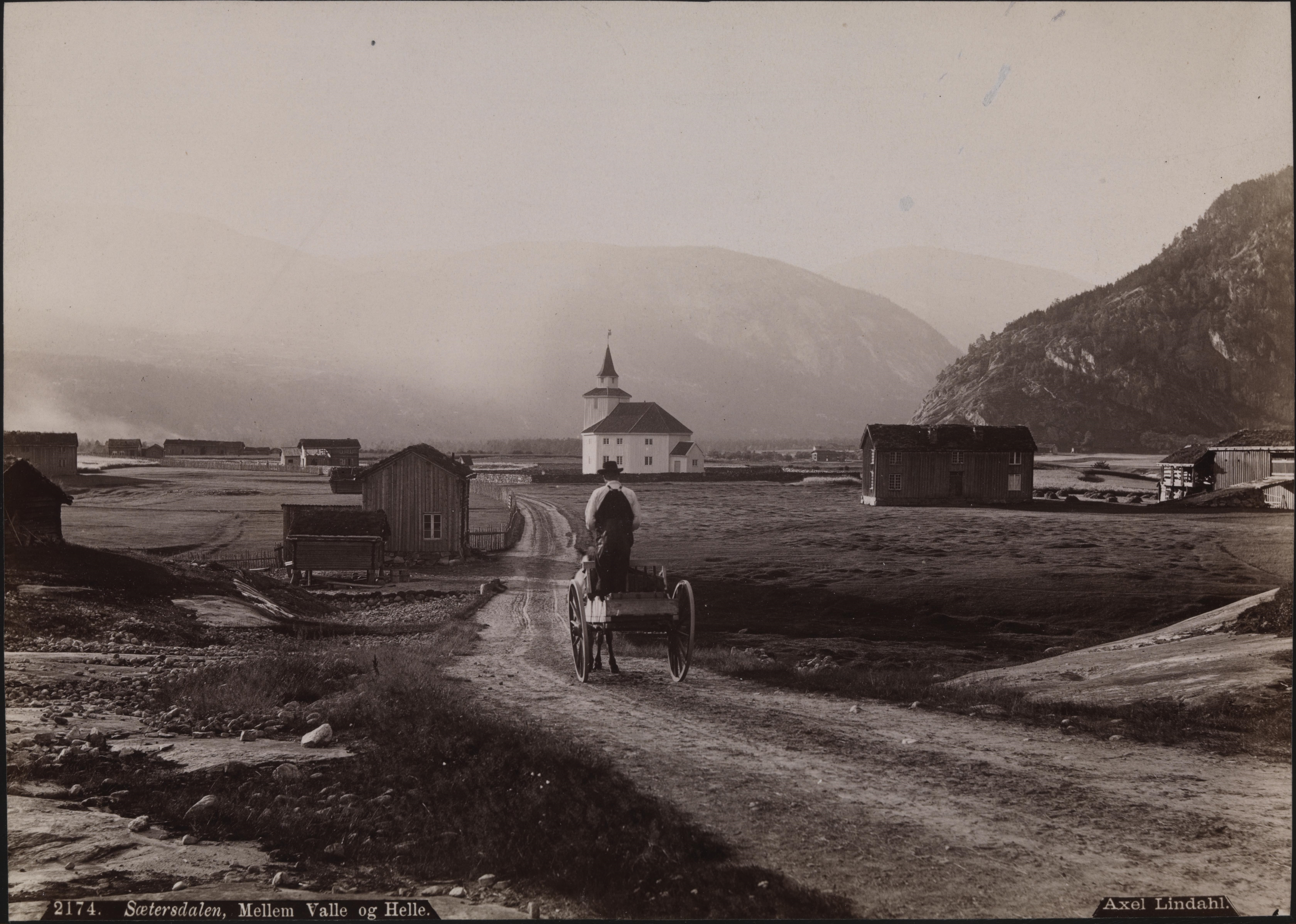
View of the church (c. 1885)

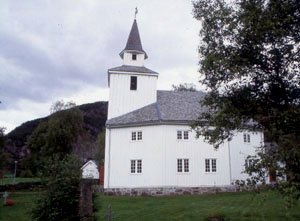
Side view of the church

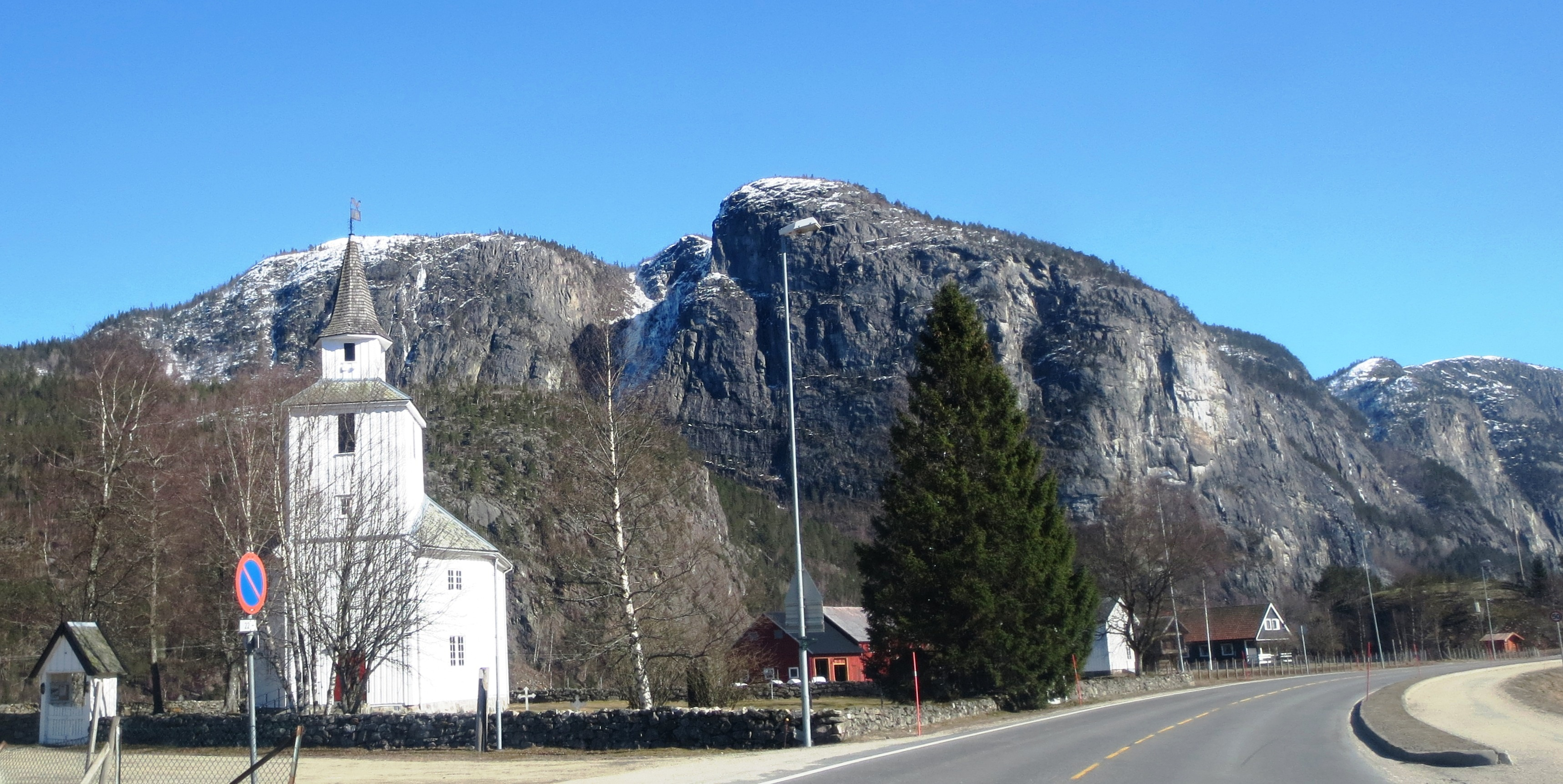
Exterior view of the church

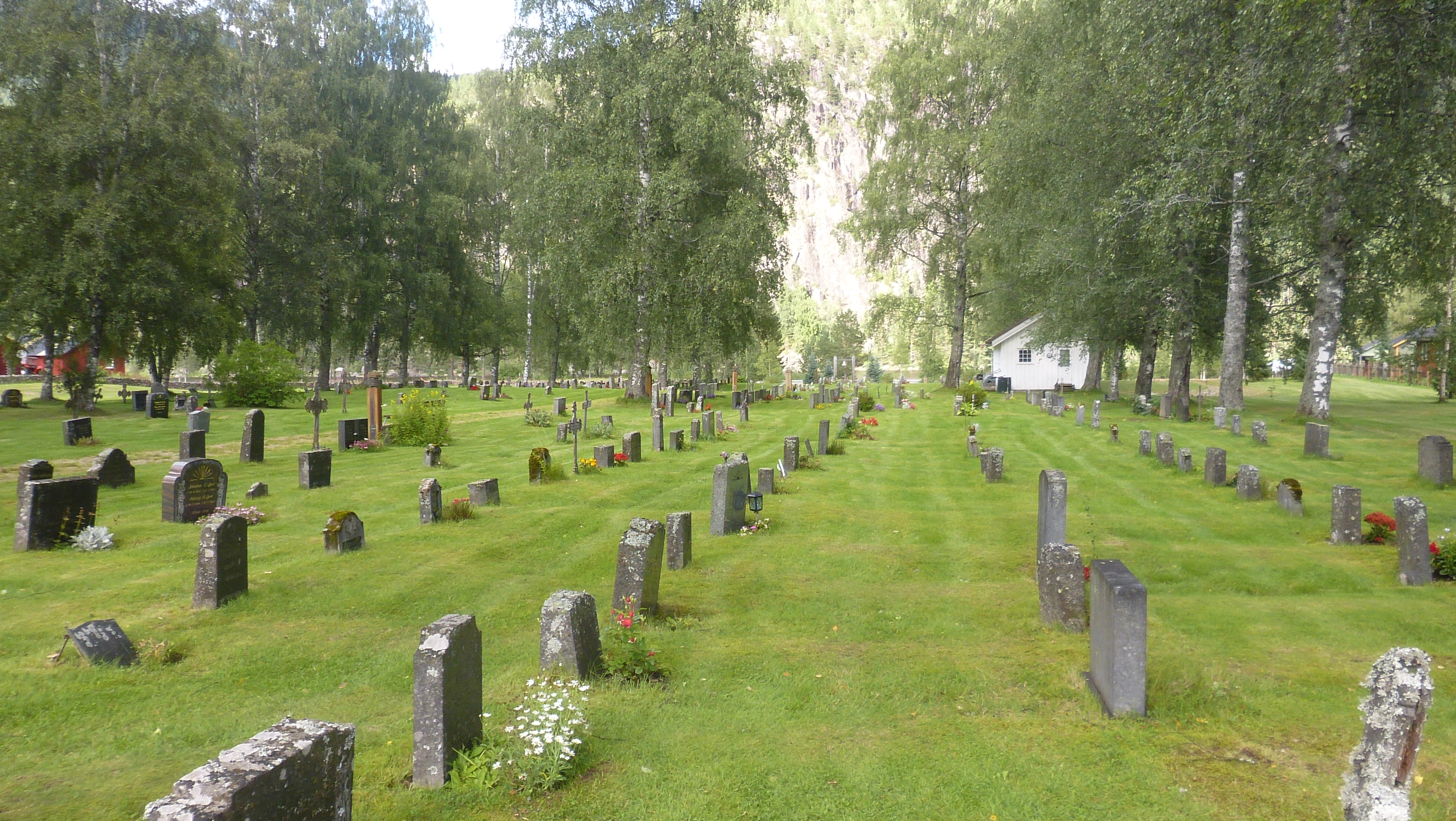
Hylestad cemetery

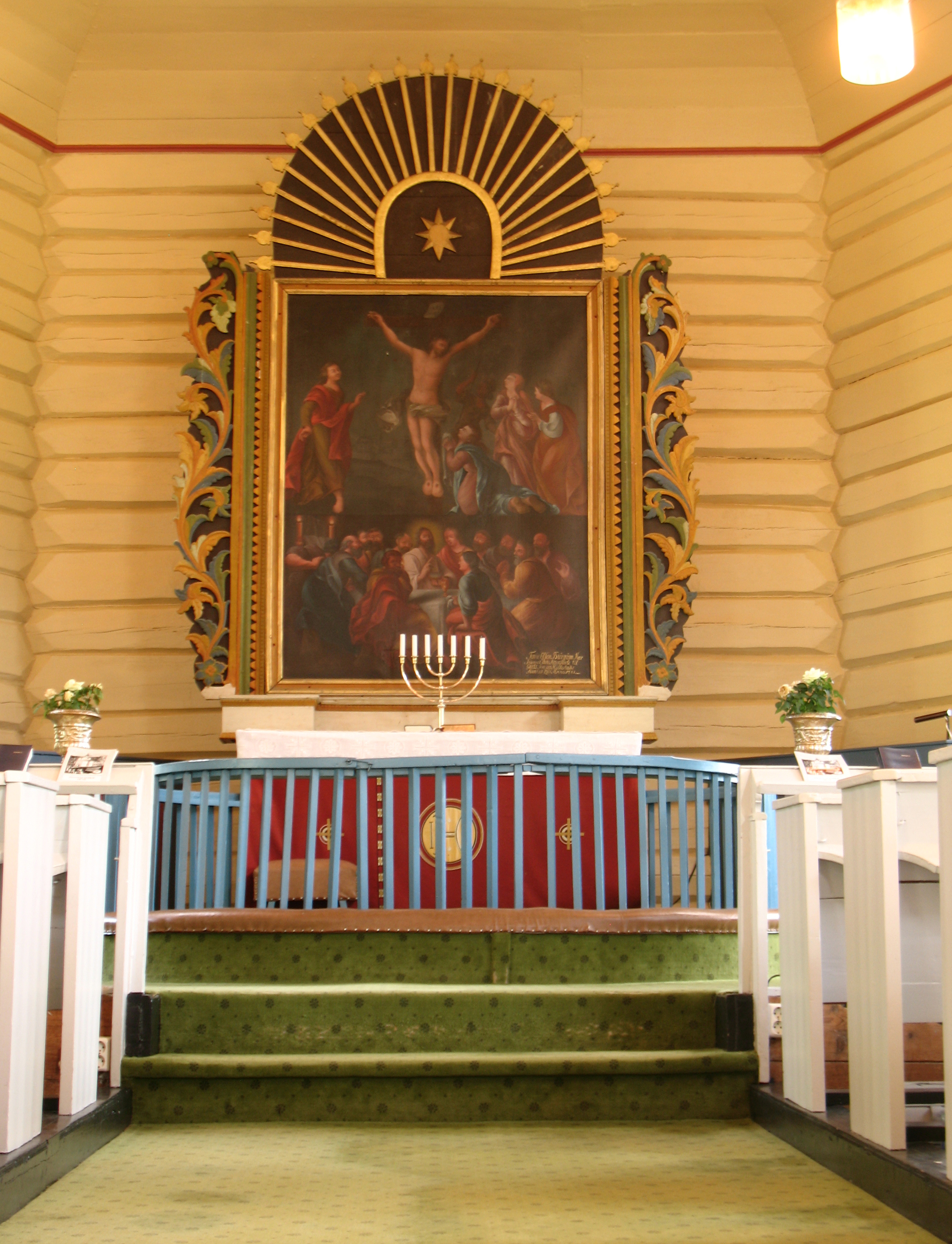
Altar inside the church

== See also ==
- List of churches in Agder og Telemark
