= Valle (village) =

Village in Valle Municipality, Norway

- Village
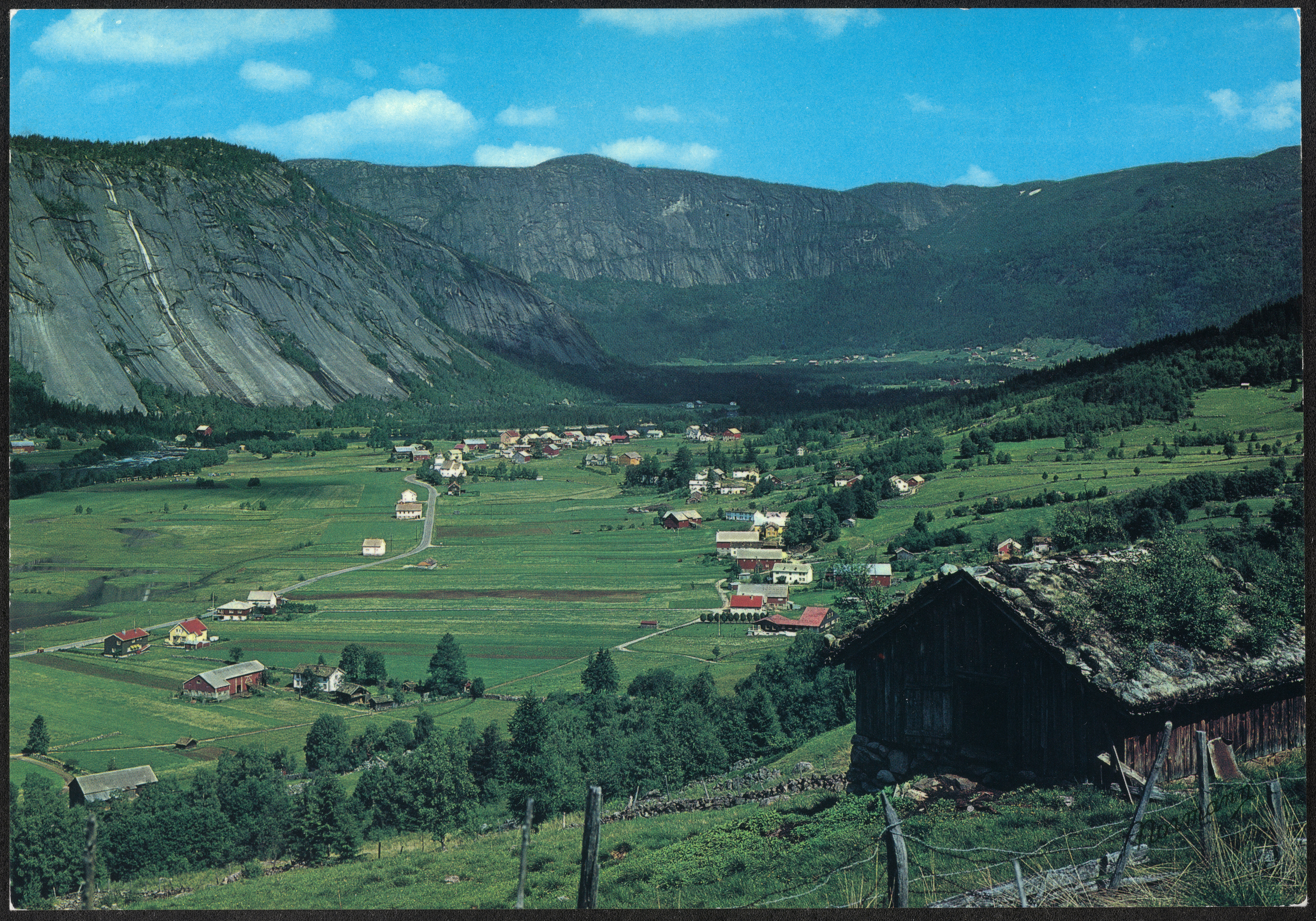
- View of the village (c. 1970)
- Interactive map of Valle
- Coordinates: 59.2126°N 07.5356°E
- Country: Norway
- Region: Southern Norway
- County: Agder
- District: Setesdal
- Municipality: Valle Municipality

Area
  - Total: 0.38 km^{2} (0.15 sq mi)
- Elevation: 310 m (1,020 ft)

Population (2018)
  - Total: 298
  - Density: 784/km^{2} (2,030/sq mi)
- Time zone: UTC+01:00 (CET)
  - Summer (DST): UTC+02:00 (CEST)
- Post Code: 4747 Valle

Valle (Urban East Norwegian: [ˈvɑ̂ɫːə]) is the administrative centre of Valle Municipality in Agder county, Norway. The village is located in the Setesdal valley, along the river Otra. The village lies along the Norwegian National Road 9, about 160 kilometres (99 mi) north of the city of Kristiansand.

The 0.38-square-kilometre (94-acre) village had a population (2018) of 298 and a population density of 784 inhabitants per square kilometre (2,030/sq mi). Since 2018, the population and area data for this village area has not been separately tracked by Statistics Norway.

The village has municipal offices, schools, Valle Church, stores, a bank, hotels, and camping facilities. The local high school specializes in silversmith and goldsmith training as part of the Setesdal Upper Secondary School. This leads students from all over Norway and internationally to come to Valle to train to become jewelers.

== Climate ==
Climate data for Valle 1991-2020 (308 m, avg highs/lows 2012-2025, recording since 1872)
Month	Jan	Feb	Mar	Apr	May	Jun	Jul	Aug	Sep	Oct	Nov	Dec	Year
Mean daily maximum °C (°F)	0 (32)	1.7 (35.1)	5.7 (42.3)	9.7 (49.5)	15.5 (59.9)	19.6 (67.3)	21.2 (70.2)	19.5 (67.1)	15.8 (60.4)	9.6 (49.3)	4.2 (39.6)	1.2 (34.2)	10.3 (50.6)
Daily mean °C (°F)	−3 (27)	−3.1 (26.4)	0 (32)	4.1 (39.4)	8.7 (47.7)	12.7 (54.9)	14.9 (58.8)	13.5 (56.3)	10 (50)	4.8 (40.6)	0.6 (33.1)	−2.8 (27.0)	5.0 (41.1)
Mean daily minimum °C (°F)	−6.8 (19.8)	−6.1 (21.0)	−3.3 (26.1)	−0.6 (30.9)	4 (39)	8.3 (46.9)	10.2 (50.4)	9.1 (48.4)	6.9 (44.4)	2.7 (36.9)	−1.2 (29.8)	−4.8 (23.4)	1.5 (34.7)
Average precipitation mm (inches)	115 (4.5)	73 (2.9)	58 (2.3)	49 (1.9)	68 (2.7)	74 (2.9)	89 (3.5)	117 (4.6)	108 (4.3)	132 (5.2)	122 (4.8)	117 (4.6)	1,122 (44.2)
Source 1: Yr.no statistics
Source 2: Seklima
