= Berdalen =

Village in Bykle Municipality, Norway

- Village
- Interactive map of Berdalen
- Coordinates: 59.44722°N 7.42981°E
- Country: Norway
- Region: Southern Norway
- County: Agder
- District: Setesdal
- Municipality: Bykle Municipality
- Elevation: 794 m (2,605 ft)
- Time zone: UTC+01:00 (CET)
  - Summer (DST): UTC+02:00 (CEST)
- Post Code: 4754 Bykle

Berdalen is a village in Bykle Municipality in Agder county, Norway. The village is located in the Setesdalen valley, along the river Otra and the Norwegian National Road 9. It is about 12 kilometres (7.5 mi) north of the village of Bykle and the same distance south of the village of Hovden. The small village of Hoslemo and the lake Vatndalsvatnet both lie about 3 kilometres (1.9 mi) to the west of the village. Berdalen has several large mountains located about 10 kilometres (6.2 mi) to the east along the municipal border. The mountains (from north to south) include Gråsteinsnosi, Brandsnutene, Svolhusgreini, Sæbyggjenuten, and Støylsdalsnutene.

The small village grew up around three farms that have been in use since before the year 1350, possibly back to the Viking Age. The village gained many new homesteads during the 20th century and by 1991, there were at least 27 farms and residences in the small village.
