= Bykle =

Bykle may refer to:

== Places ==
- Bykle Municipality, a municipality in Agder county, Norway
- Bykle (village), a village within Bykle Municipality in Agder county, Norway
- Bykle Church, a church in Bykle Municipality in Agder county, Norway
- Bykle Airport, Hovden, a small airport in Bykle Municipality in Agder county, Norway
