= Storhellernuten =

Mountain in Norway

- Storheddernuten / Storhidlernuten

Highest point
- Elevation: 1,402 m (4,600 ft)
- Prominence: 147 m (482 ft)
- Parent peak: Skyvassnuten
- Isolation: 3 km (1.9 mi)
- Coordinates: 59°39′44″N 7°08′17″E

Geography
- Location: Agder and Rogaland, Norway
- Parent range: Setesdalsheiene

Storhellernuten is a mountain on the border of Agder and Rogaland counties in southern Norway. The 1,402-metre (4,600 ft) tall mountain has a topographic prominence of 147 metres (482 ft). The mountain sits on the border of Suldal Municipality in Rogaland and Bykle Municipality in Agder. The mountain is the 21st highest mountain in Agder county.

The mountain sits near the northernmost point in Agder county, just south of the lake Holmavatnet. The mountain Skyvassnuten and the lake Skyvatn lie just a few kilometers south of this mountain. There is road access from the village of Nesflaten in Suldal located about 20 kilometres (12 mi) to the west.

== See also ==
- List of mountains of Norway
