= Brandsnutane =

Mountain in southern Norway

Highest point
- Elevation: 1,496 m (4,908 ft)
- Prominence: 90 m (300 ft)
- Parent peak: Sigurdstind
- Isolation: 0.884 km (0.549 mi)
- Coordinates: 59°29′33″N 7°36′35″E

Geography
- Location: Agder and Telemark, Norway
- Parent range: Setesdalsheiene

Brandsnutane is a 1,496-metre (4,908 ft) tall mountain on the borders of Agder and Telemark counties in southern Norway. It is the second highest mountain of the mountains in Agder with a prominence of at least 50 metres (160 ft). The mountain is located on the borders of Bykle Municipality (in Agder) and Tokke Municipality (in Telemark). The mountain has a secondary peak of 1,480 metres (4,860 ft) located about 1 kilometre (0.62 mi) east of the municipal/county border inside Tokke Municipality.

The mountain sits in the Setesdalsheiene mountains on the eastern side of the Setesdal valley. It is a part of a line of large mountains marking the county border. The mountain Gråsteinsnosi lies a few kilometers to the north and the mountains of Svolhusgreini and Sæbyggjenuten lie a few kilometers to the south. The nearest village is Berdalen, located on the river Otra, about 10 kilometres (6.2 mi) to the southwest of the mountain. The lake Byrtevatn in Tokke Municipality lies 15 kilometres (9.3 mi) straight to the east.

== See also ==
- List of mountains in Norway by height
