= Svolhusgreini =

Mountain in southern Norway

- Svålufsgreina

Highest point
- Elevation: 1,423 m (4,669 ft)
- Prominence: 148 m (486 ft)
- Parent peak: Kvannefjell
- Isolation: 1.7 km (1.1 mi)
- Coordinates: 59°28′45″N 7°35′39″E

Geography
- Location: Agder and Telemark, Norway
- Parent range: Setesdalsheiene

Svolhusgreini is a mountain on the border of Agder and Telemark counties in southern Norway. The 1,420-metre (4,660 ft) tall mountain is the 14th highest mountain in Agder county. The mountain has a topographic prominence of 50 metres (160 ft). The mountain sits on the border of Bykle Municipality in Agder and Tokke Municipality in Telemark. It is located in the Setesdalsheiene mountains about half-way between the mountains of Brandsnutene to the north and Sæbyggjenuten to the south. The village of Berdalen lies about 10 kilometres (6.2 mi) to the southwest.

== See also ==
- List of mountains of Norway
