= Skyvatn =

Lake in Agder, Norway

- Interactive map of Skyvatn
- Location: Bykle Municipality, Agder
- Coordinates: 59.61973°N 7.17645°E
- Basin countries: Norway
- Max. length: 5 kilometres (3.1 mi)
- Max. width: 1.2 kilometres (0.75 mi)
- Surface area: 4.35 km^{2} (1.68 sq mi)
- Shore length^{1}: 16.1 kilometres (10.0 mi)
- Surface elevation: 1,090 metres (3,580 ft)
- References: NVE
- ^{1} Shore length is not a well-defined measure.

Skyvatn is a lake in the northern part of Bykle Municipality in Agder county, Norway. The lake is located south of the lake Holmavatnet and northwest of the lake Hartevatn. The village of Hovden is located about 9 kilometres (5.6 mi) southeast of the lake.

The lake has an area of 4.35 square kilometres (1.68 sq mi) and is located in the Setesdalsheiene mountains at an elevation of 1,090 metres (3,580 ft) above sea level. The mountains of Storhellernuten, Skyvassnuten, and Sveigen are all located to the northwest, west, and southwest, respectively.

== See also ==
- List of lakes in Aust-Agder
- List of lakes in Norway
