= Skyvassnuten =

Mountain in Agder, Norway

Highest point
- Elevation: 1,421 m (4,662 ft)
- Prominence: 276 m (906 ft)
- Parent peak: Snønuten
- Isolation: 8.5 km (5.3 mi)
- Coordinates: 59°38′15″N 7°07′05″E

Geography
- Location: Agder, Norway
- Parent range: Setesdalsheiene

Skyvassnuten is a mountain in Bykle Municipality in Agder county, Norway. The 1,421-metre (4,662 ft) tall mountain sits just 1.2 kilometres (0.75 mi) east of the municipal/county border with Rogaland. The lake Skyvatn lies at the eastern foot of the mountain, and the mountain Sveigen lies immediately south of the mountain. The lake Holmavatnet lies about 5 kilometres (3.1 mi) north of the mountain.

== See also ==
- List of mountains of Norway
