= Hartevatn =

Lake in Agder, Norway

- Hartevatnet (unofficial)
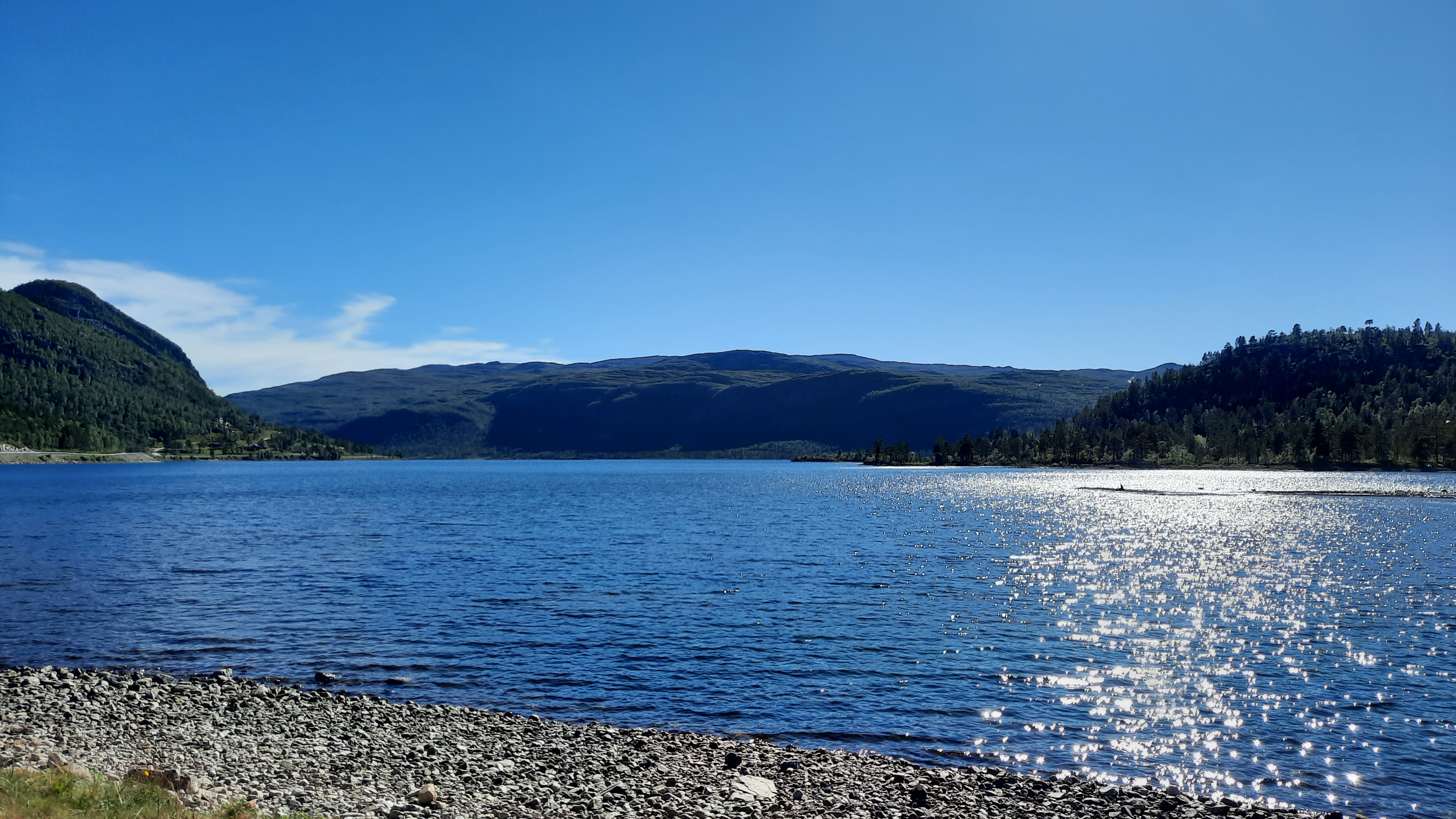
- Interactive map of Hartevatn
- Location: Bykle Municipality, Agder
- Coordinates: 59.5381093°N 7.3551012°E
- Primary inflows: River Otra
- Primary outflows: River Otra
- Catchment area: Otra
- Basin countries: Norway
- Max. length: 5.9 kilometres (3.7 mi)
- Max. width: 2.1 kilometres (1.3 mi)
- Surface area: 5.92 km^{2} (2.29 sq mi)
- Shore length^{1}: 24 kilometres (15 mi)
- Surface elevation: 759 metres (2,490 ft)
- References: NVE
- ^{1} Shore length is not a well-defined measure.

Hartevatn is a lake in Bykle Municipality in Agder county, Norway. It is located along the river Otra, on the south side of the village of Hovden. The lake is a good fishing spot and contains many brown trout. The Norwegian National Road 9 runs along the eastern shore of the lake. The lake Skyvatn lies about 6 kilometres (3.7 mi) to the northwest and the lake Holmavatnet lies about 13 kilometres (8.1 mi) to the northwest.

The lake is a man-made reservoir. It was formed by the building of a hydro-electric dam on the river Otra. It is also connected to the nearby lake Breivevatnet by a canal.

== See also ==
- List of lakes in Aust-Agder
- List of lakes in Norway
