= Sveigen =

Mountain in Agder County, Norway

Highest point
- Elevation: 1,389 m (4,557 ft)
- Prominence: 50 m (160 ft)
- Coordinates: 59°36′40″N 7°06′03″E

Geography
- Location: Agder, Norway
- Parent range: Setesdalsheiene

Sveigen is a mountain in Bykle Municipality in Agder county, Norway. The 1,389-metre (4,557 ft) tall mountain sits just 700 metres (2,300 ft) east of the border with Rogaland county. The mountain Skyvassnuten lies to the north of Sveigen and the lake Skyvatn lies to the east.

== See also ==
- List of mountains of Norway
