= Gråsteinsnosi =

Mountain in Agder, Norway

Highest point
- Elevation: 1,468 m (4,816 ft)
- Prominence: 94 m (308 ft)
- Parent peak: Kvannefjell
- Isolation: 3.6 km (2.2 mi)
- Coordinates: 59°31′27″N 7°32′11″E

Geography
- Location: Agder, Norway
- Parent range: Setesdalsheiene

Gråsteinsnosi is a mountain on the border of Agder and Telemark counties in southern Norway. The 1,468-metre (4,816 ft) tall mountain has a prominence of 94 metres (308 ft), making it the 3rd highest mountain in Agder of all the mountains with a prominence of more than 50 metres (160 ft). Gråsteinsnosi is located on the border of Bykle Municipality (in Agder) and Tokke Municipality (in Telemark). The mountain sits about 4 kilometres (2.5 mi) northwest of the mountain Brandsnutane and about 11 kilometres (6.8 mi) southeast of the village of Hovden.

== See also ==
- List of mountains in Norway by height
