= Stølsdalsnutane =

Mountain in southern Norway

- Støylsdalsnutene

Highest point
- Elevation: 1,438 m (4,718 ft)
- Prominence: 100 m (330 ft)
- Coordinates: 59°24′56″N 7°33′51″E

Geography
- Location: Agder and Telemark, Norway
- Parent range: Setesdalsheiene

Stølsdalsnutane is a mountain on the border of Agder and Telemark counties in southern Norway. The 1,438-metre (4,718 ft) tall mountain actually has 3 peaks, all three are just slightly over the border inside Bykle Municipality in Agder, but much of the mountain lies in neighboring Tokke Municipality in Telemark county. The highest peak, known as Nordvestre Stølsdalsnuten, is the 7th highest peak in Agder. The second highest of the three peaks, called Nordre Stølsdalsknuten is the 9th highest peak in the county at 1,424 metres (4,672 ft), and the third peak, known as Sørvestre Stølsdalsknuten, is the 10th highest peak in the county at 1,420 metres (4,660 ft).

The mountain sits in the Setesdalsheiene range, on the east side of the Setesdalen valley in a line of large mountains marking the county border. The mountain Sæbyggjenuten lies about 6 kilometres (3.7 mi) to the northeast and about 5 kilometres (3.1 mi) west of the mountain Urdenosi.

== See also ==
- List of mountains of Norway
