= Breive =

Village in Bykle Municipality, Norway

- Village
- Interactive map of Breive
- Coordinates: 59.57381°N 7.29041°E
- Country: Norway
- Region: Southern Norway
- County: Agder
- District: Setesdal
- Municipality: Bykle Municipality
- Elevation: 763 m (2,503 ft)
- Time zone: UTC+01:00 (CET)
  - Summer (DST): UTC+02:00 (CEST)
- Post Code: 4755 Hovden i Setesdal

Breive is a village in Bykle Municipality in Agder county, Norway. The village is located in the northern part of the Setesdalen valley, on the northern shore of the lake Breivevatnet, about 5 kilometres (3.1 mi) west of the village of Hovden. The small village has a handful of residences, mainly farms. The village grew up around two farmsteads that have been in use since before the 1600s.
