= Fjellgardane Church =

Church in Agder, Norway

- Fjellgardane kyrkje
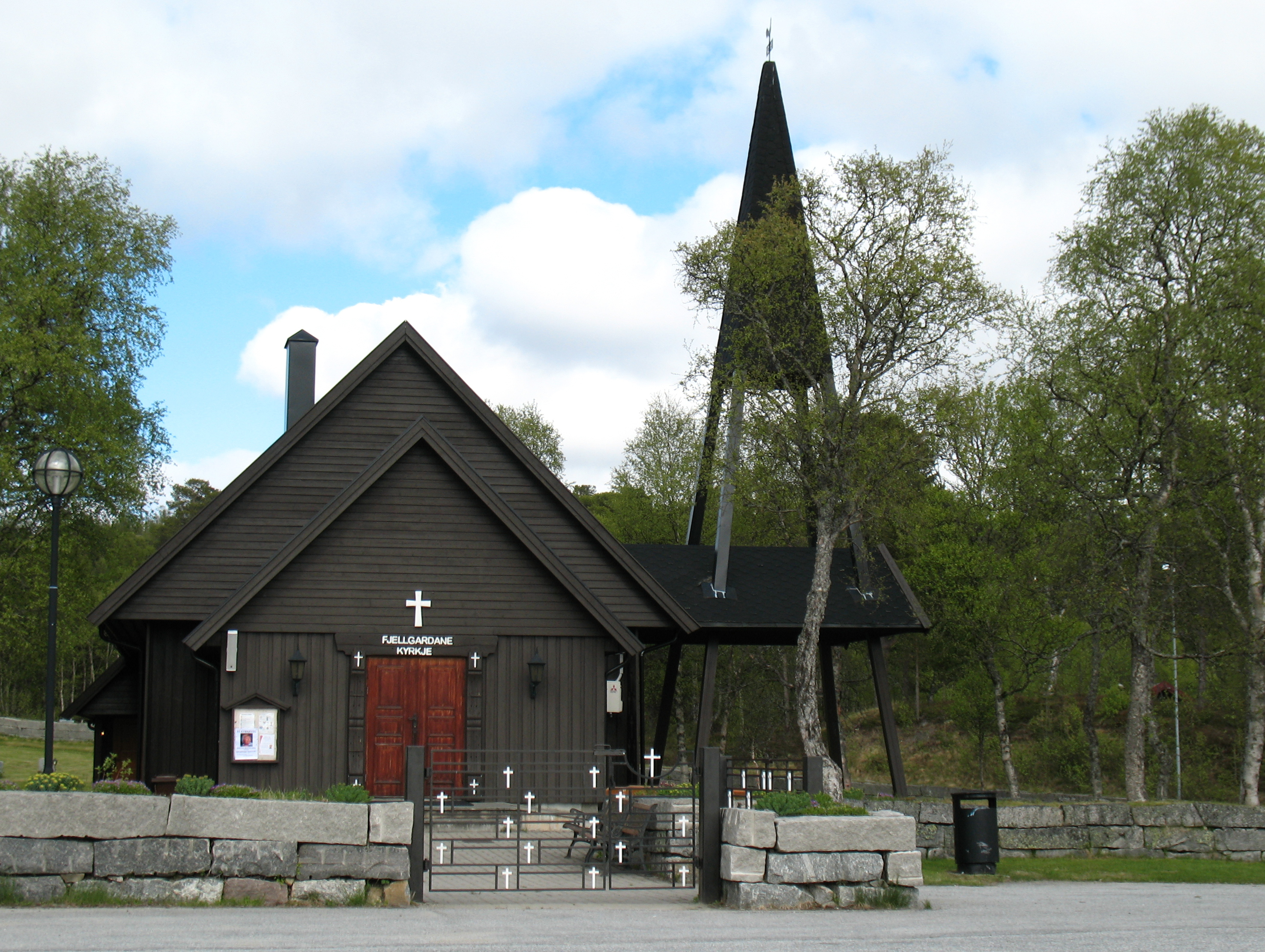
- View of the church
- Fjellgardane Church
- 59.5615°N 07.3542°E
- Location: Bykle Municipality, Agder
- Country: Norway
- Denomination: Church of Norway
- Churchmanship: Evangelical Lutheran

History
- Former name: Hovden kapell
- Status: Parish church
- Founded: 1957
- Consecrated: 22 Sept 1957

Architecture
- Functional status: Active
- Architect: Torjus Bjåen
- Architectural type: Long church
- Completed: 1957 (69 years ago)

Specifications
- Capacity: 110
- Materials: Wood

Administration
- Diocese: Agder og Telemark
- Deanery: Otredal prosti
- Parish: Bykle
- Norwegian Cultural Heritage Site
- Type: Church
- Status: Not protected
- ID: 84643

Fjellgardane Church (Norwegian: Fjellgardane kirke) is a parish church of the Church of Norway in Bykle Municipality in Agder county, Norway. It is located in the village of Hovden. It is one of the churches for the Bykle parish which is part of the Otredal prosti (deanery) in the Diocese of Agder og Telemark. The brown, wooden church was built in a long church design in 1957. The church seats about 110 people.

== History ==
Hovden Chapel was built in 1957 to serve the Hovden community. It was consecrated on 22 September 1957 by the Bishop Johannes Smidt. The small chapel cost 58,000 kr. In 2002, the church was renovated by the architect Torjus Bjåen and it was enlarged and renamed Fjellgardane Church.

== See also ==
- List of churches in Agder og Telemark
