= Hovden, Agder =

Village in Bykle Municipality, Norway

Hovden Hovden i Setesdal
- Village
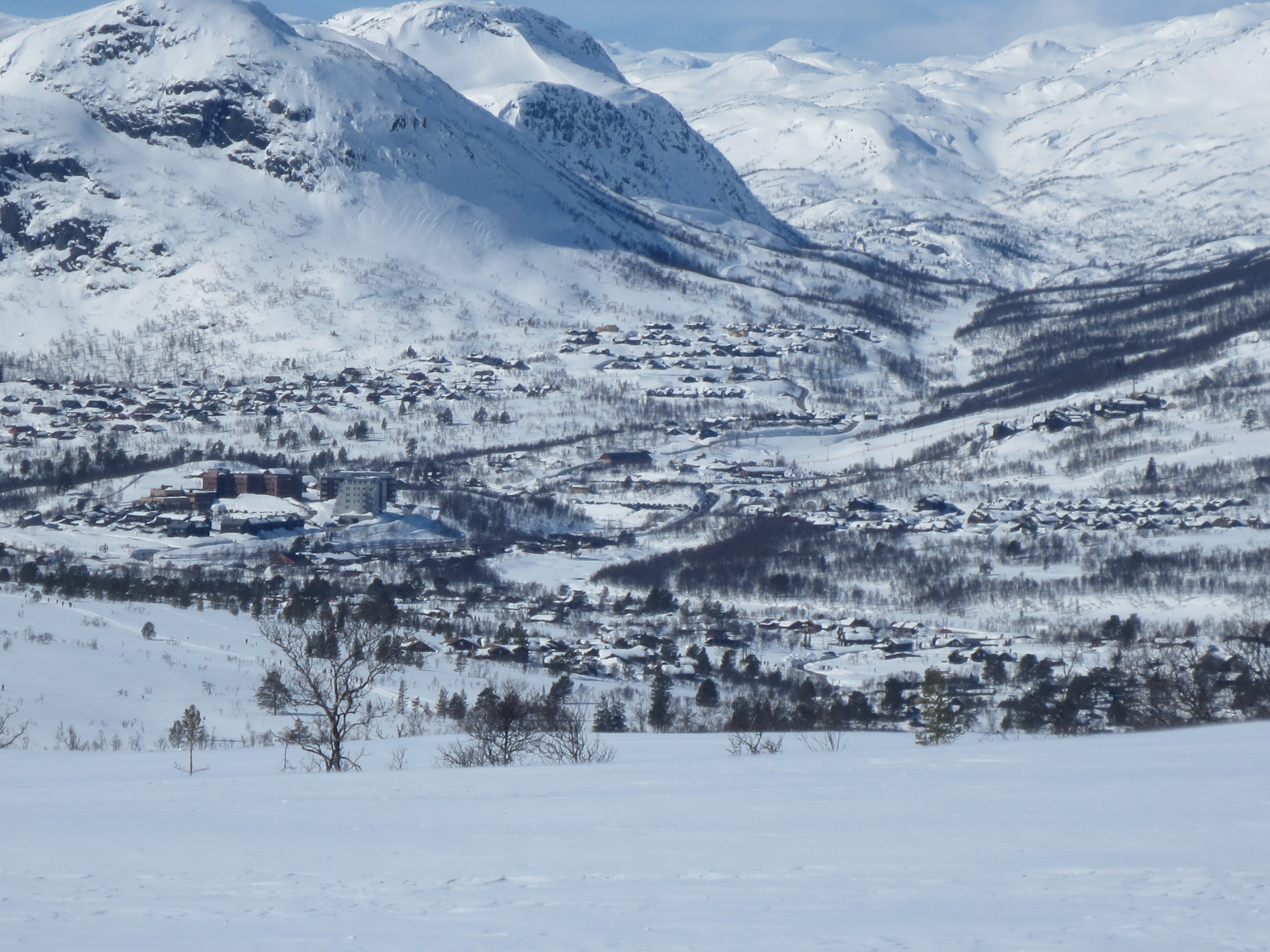
- View of the village in winter
- Interactive map of Hovden
- Coordinates: 59.56031°N 7.35673°E
- Country: Norway
- Region: Southern Norway
- County: Agder
- District: Setesdal
- Municipality: Bykle Municipality

Area
  - Total: 0.66 km^{2} (0.25 sq mi)
- Elevation: 800 m (2,600 ft)

Population (2025)
  - Total: 464
  - Density: 703/km^{2} (1,820/sq mi)
- Time zone: UTC+01:00 (CET)
  - Summer (DST): UTC+02:00 (CEST)
- Post Code: 4755 Hovden i Setesdal

Hovden is a village in Bykle Municipality in Agder county, Norway. It is located in the northern part of Setesdalen valley, on the Norwegian National Road 9 and the river Otra, on the eastern shore of the lake Hartevatnet. The village sits about 25 kilometres (16 mi) north of the village of Bykle and about 4 kilometres (2.5 mi) east of the village of Breive. The 0.66-square-kilometre (160-acre) village has a population (2025) of 464 and a population density of 703 inhabitants per square kilometre (1,820/sq mi). Fjellgardane Church is located in Hovden.

== Tourism ==
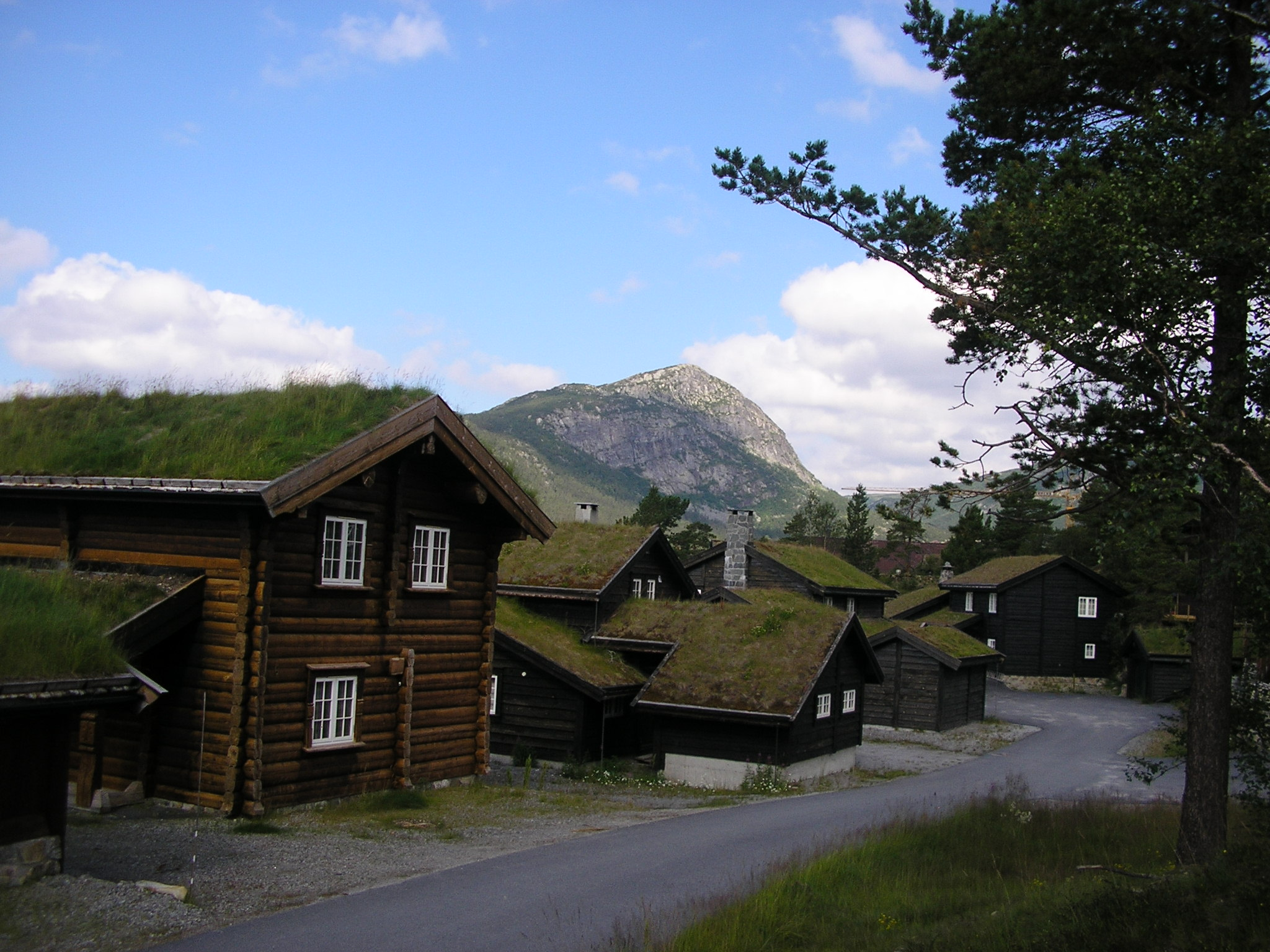
Cottages and accommodation houses

The Hovden area is a major winter tourism area since it is located in the Setesdalsheiene mountains and near many lakes such as Skyvatn, Holmavatnet, and Vatndalsvatnet.

Hovden has many leisure activities in the wintertime, especially skiing and ice fishing. There is a major downhill ski resort in Hovden as well as a water park and spa. In the summertime, tourists come to go hiking and fishing in the lakes. The Ørnefjell Golf Course in Hovden is a 9-hole golf course. The area has Scandinavia's southernmost occurrence of wild reindeer. In the autumn, Hovden is known for its abundance of bilberries, lingonberries, and cloudberries.

=== Climate ===
Climate data for Hovden - Lundane 1991–2020 (841 m, avg highs/lows 2003-2025)
Month	Jan	Feb	Mar	Apr	May	Jun	Jul	Aug	Sep	Oct	Nov	Dec	Year
Record high °C (°F)	6.8 (44.2)	10.8 (51.4)	13.4 (56.1)	20.7 (69.3)	23.7 (74.7)	26.0 (78.8)	27.8 (82.0)	25.5 (77.9)	22.4 (72.3)	20.5 (68.9)	12.2 (54.0)	7.3 (45.1)	27.8 (82.0)
Mean daily maximum °C (°F)	−3.1 (26.4)	−2.1 (28.2)	1.4 (34.5)	5.3 (41.5)	9.6 (49.3)	14.7 (58.5)	16.7 (62.1)	15.5 (59.9)	11.9 (53.4)	6.3 (43.3)	1.5 (34.7)	−1.7 (28.9)	6.3 (43.4)
Daily mean °C (°F)	−6.5 (20.3)	−7 (19)	−4.8 (23.4)	−0.6 (30.9)	3.9 (39.0)	8.5 (47.3)	11.4 (52.5)	10.3 (50.5)	6.7 (44.1)	1.7 (35.1)	−2.3 (27.9)	−6 (21)	1.3 (34.3)
Mean daily minimum °C (°F)	−12 (10)	−12.5 (9.5)	−10 (14)	−5.4 (22.3)	−0.7 (30.7)	3 (37)	5.5 (41.9)	5 (41)	2.7 (36.9)	−1.5 (29.3)	−6.1 (21.0)	−10.1 (13.8)	−3.5 (25.6)
Record low °C (°F)	−36.2 (−33.2)	−34.0 (−29.2)	−33.6 (−28.5)	−25.4 (−13.7)	−12.8 (9.0)	−6.5 (20.3)	−3.7 (25.3)	−4.4 (24.1)	−8.7 (16.3)	−21.1 (−6.0)	−29.9 (−21.8)	−33.0 (−27.4)	−36.2 (−33.2)
Average precipitation mm (inches)	112 (4.4)	73 (2.9)	64 (2.5)	44 (1.7)	49 (1.9)	62 (2.4)	75 (3.0)	86 (3.4)	88 (3.5)	102 (4.0)	104 (4.1)	101 (4.0)	960 (37.8)
Average precipitation days (≥ 1.0 mm)	19	16	15	12	10	12	12	15	17	17	18	19	182
Source 1: yr.no
Source 2: National Oceanic and Atmospheric Administration (precipitation days)
