= Old Bykle Church =

Church in Agder, Norway

- Bykle gamle kyrkje
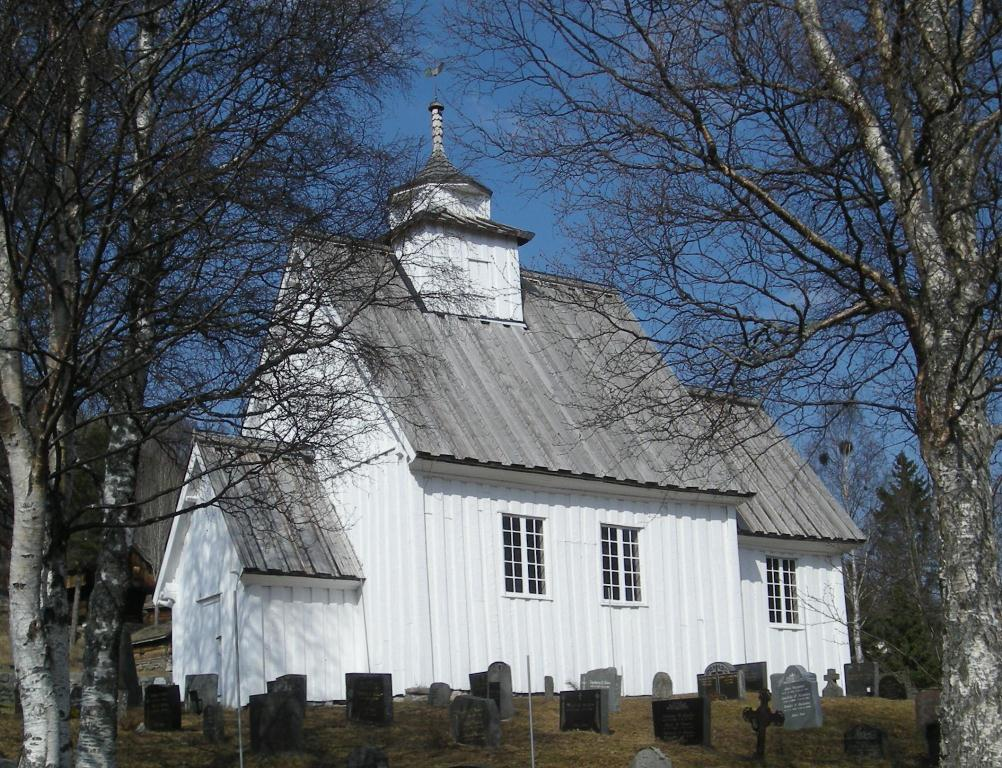
- View of the church
- Old Bykle Church
- 59.351923°N 07.344303°E
- Location: Bykle Municipality, Agder
- Country: Norway
- Denomination: Church of Norway
- Churchmanship: Evangelical Lutheran

History
- Former name: Bykle kyrkje
- Status: Parish church
- Founded: 13th century
- Consecrated: 1620

Architecture
- Functional status: Active
- Architectural type: Long church
- Completed: 1620 (406 years ago)

Specifications
- Capacity: 140
- Materials: Wood

Administration
- Diocese: Agder og Telemark
- Deanery: Otredal prosti
- Parish: Bykle
- Norwegian Cultural Heritage Site
- Type: Church
- Status: Automatically protected
- ID: 83979

Old Bykle Church (Norwegian: Bykle gamle kyrkje; historically known as Bykle kyrkje) is a former parish church of the Church of Norway in Bykle Municipality in Agder county, Norway. It is located in the village of village of Bykle. It is one of the churches for the Bykle parish which is part of the Otredal prosti (deanery) in the Diocese of Agder og Telemark. The white, wooden church was built in a long church design around the year 1620 using plans drawn up by an unknown architect. The church seats about 140 people on the main floor and balcony.

The interior of the church is decorated with rosemåling. The church was taken out of regular use in 2004 when the new Bykle Church was built a short distance to the southwest. Prior to 2004, this church was known as Bykle Church.

== History ==
There has been a church in Bykle since Catholic times. The earliest existing historical records of the church date back to the year 1327 when the Pope mentioned the church in a letter. The stave church was not new that year, however. It was likely founded sometime in the 13th century. Starting around the year 1400, there was no longer a priest for the church because after the Black Death, the area was sparsely populated. Most residents had to travel to the nearby Valle Church instead. Over time, the church maintenance had not been kept up and the church fell into disrepair.

By the early 1600s, the church had been "deserted for some time" and was in poor condition it was replaced with a new church on the same site. The Bishop agreed to have the church rebuilt and that the priest from the nearby Valle Church would hold services in the church three times per year. The new church was completed in 1619. The church is a log building with white wooden panels covering the exterior sides. It had a small, 11-metre (36 ft) long rectangular nave and a narrower choir with a lower roof line. From 1803-1806 there were major repairs and renovations were carried out. The old tower above the main entrance was removed, a new entry porch was built, and a ridge turret on the roof was built above the centre of the building. Interior balcony seating was added during this period as well. The interior walls were decorated with rosemåling designs in 1826 by Aslak Vasshus from Neslandsvatn in Telemark and Knut Åvoldsson from Bykle.

In the late 20th century, the Old Bykle Church (then known simply as Bykle Church) was deemed to be too old and small for the local congregation, so a new church building was commissioned. Bishop Olav Skjevesland laid the foundation stone for the new Bykle Church on 1 January 2000. The new church was built about 90 metres (300 ft) to the southwest of the old church site. The new church building was consecrated on 4 September 2004 by Bishop Skjevesland and it was named Bykle Church and the old church was renamed Old Bykle Church. Since then, the old church has been taken out of regular use and it is used for special events and the local Setesdal Museum runs guided tours of the church in the summers.

== Media gallery ==
=== Exterior ===
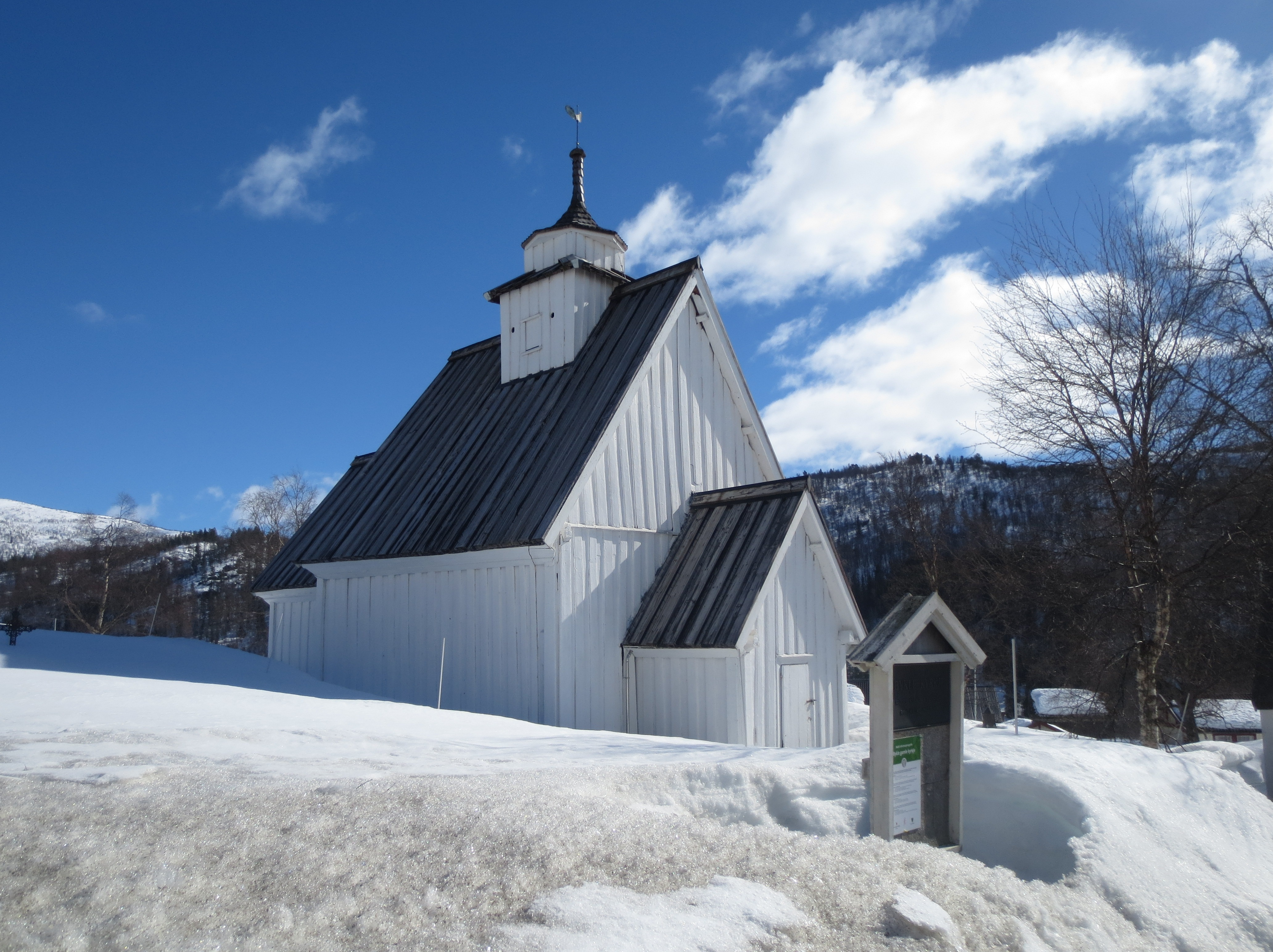
Side view

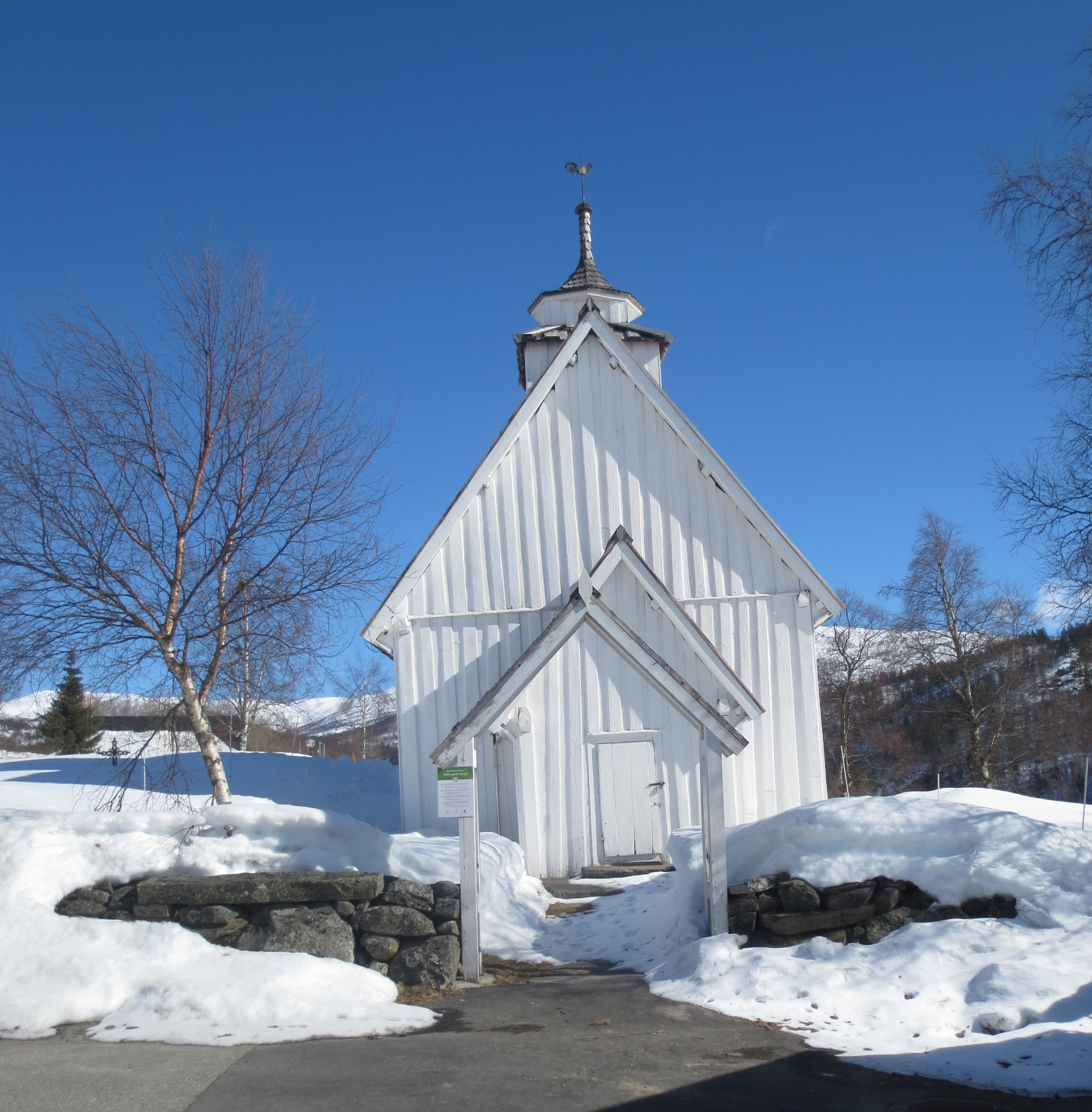
Front view

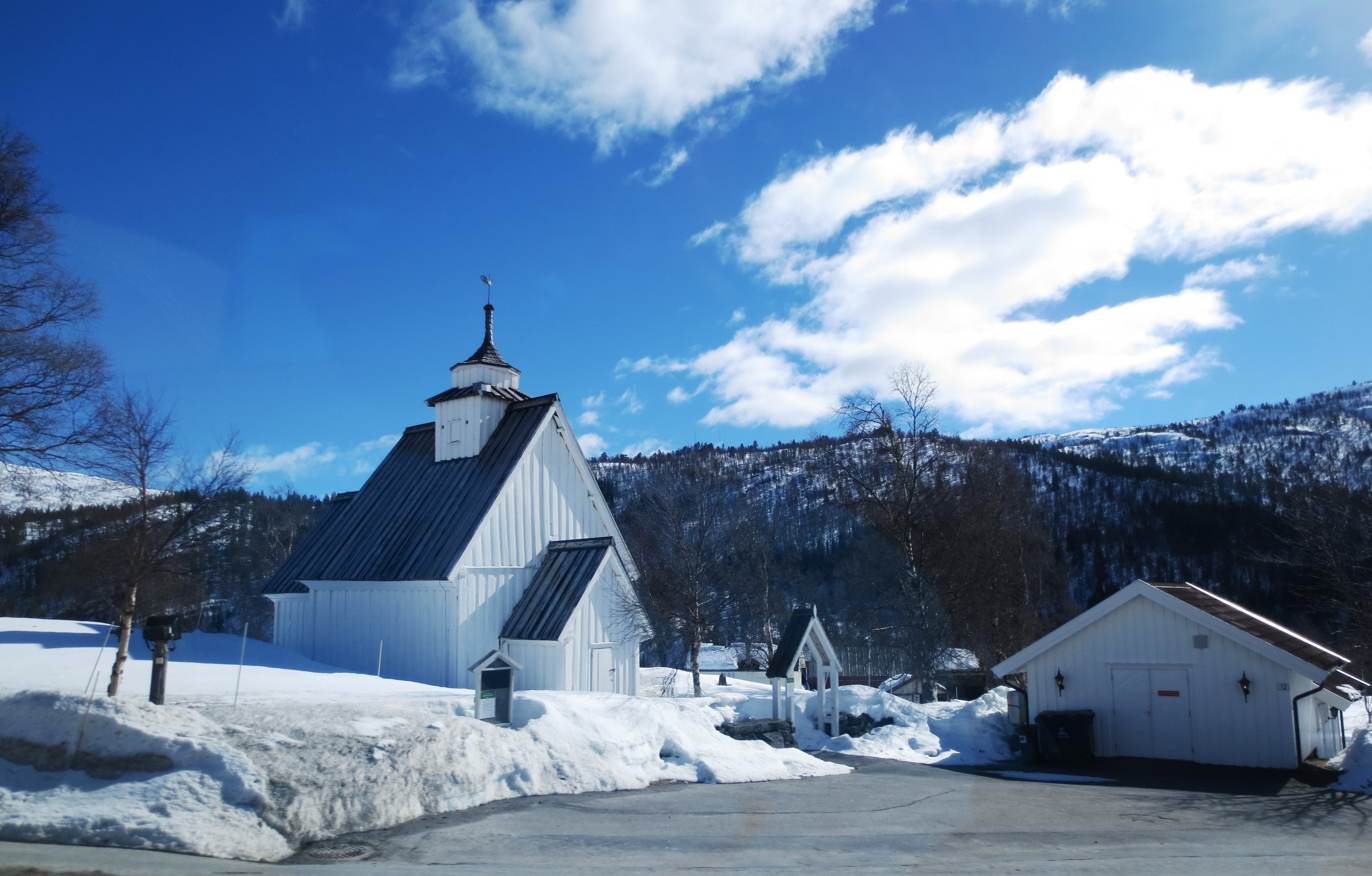
Side view

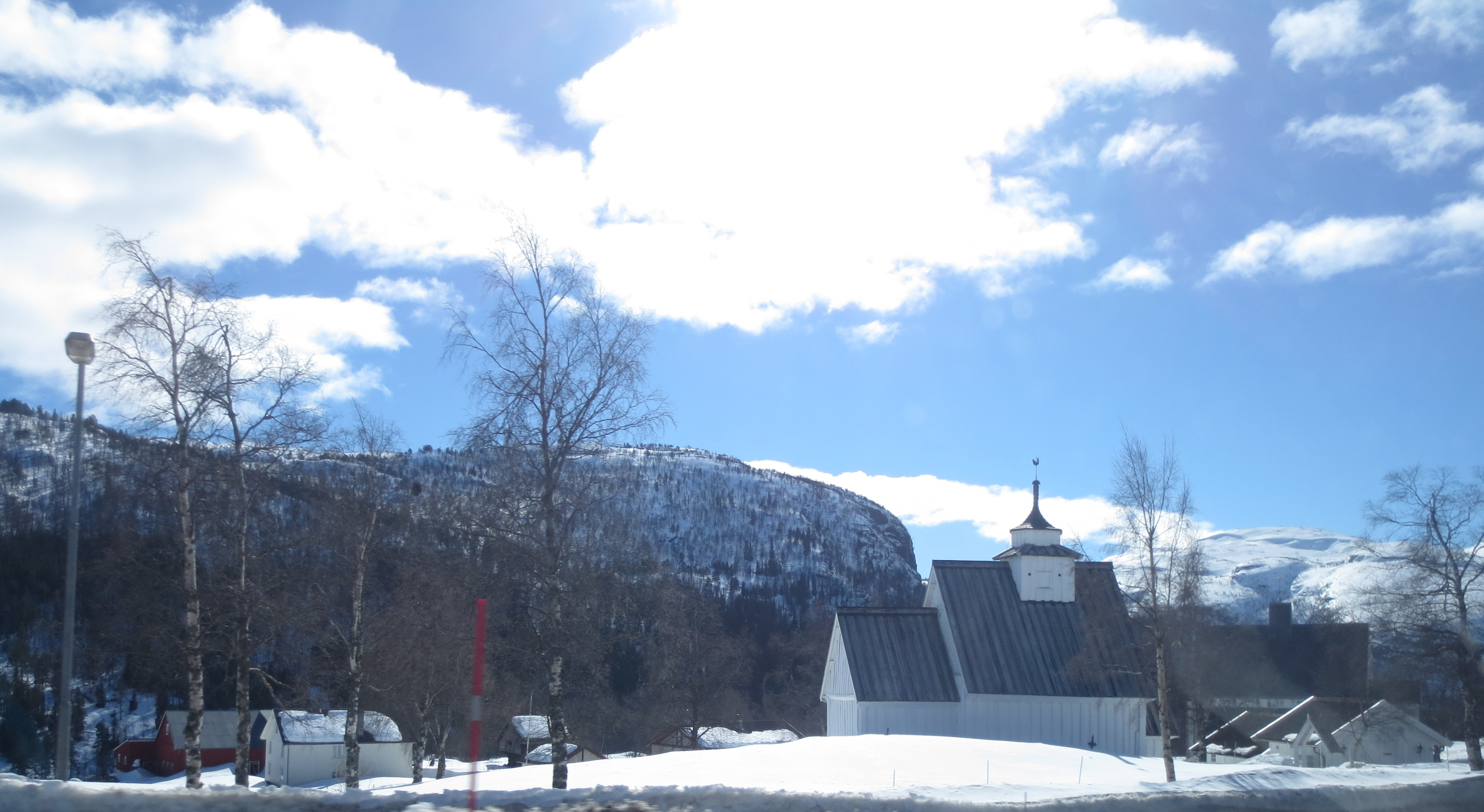
Surrounding view

=== Interior ===
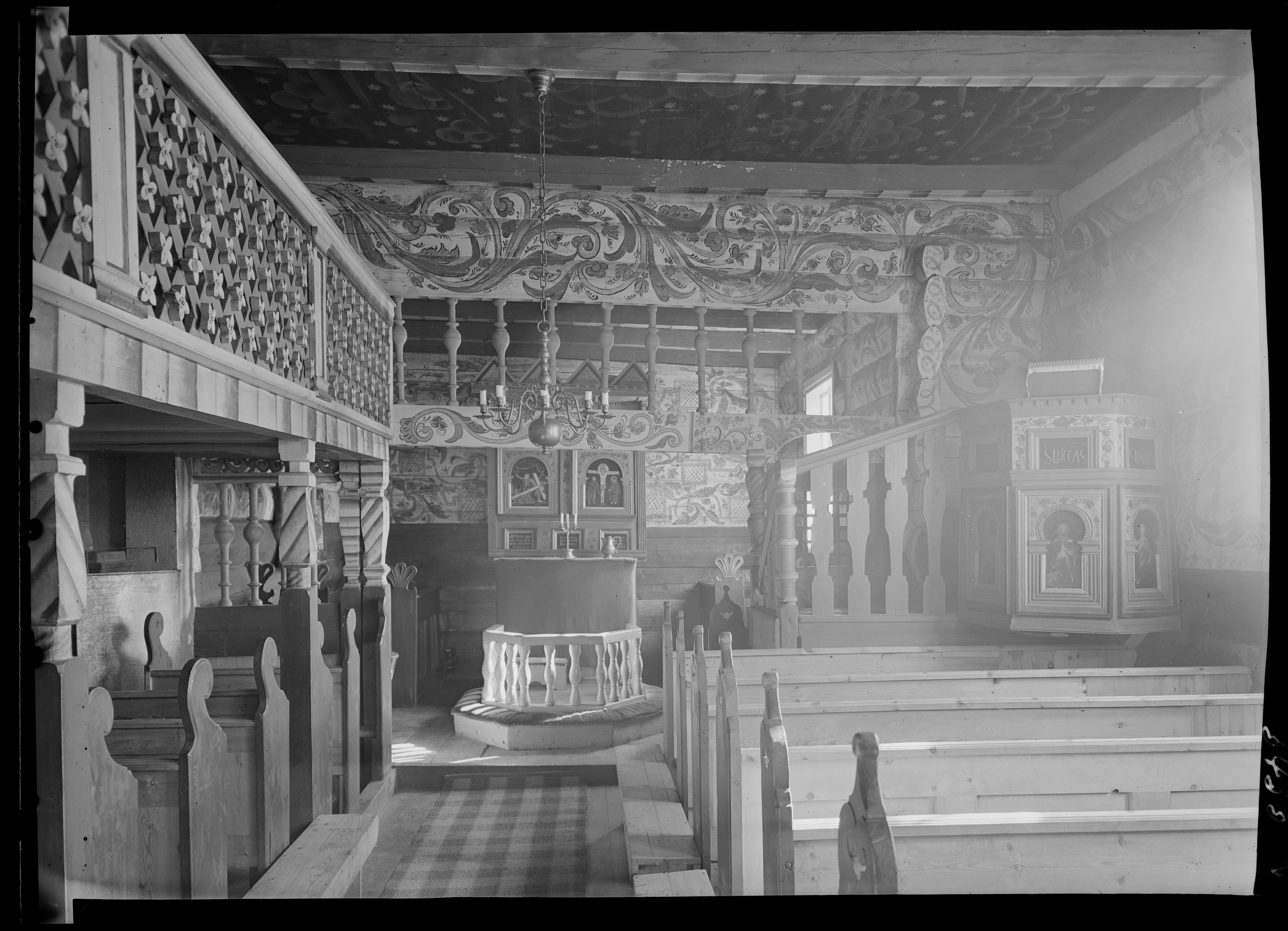
Front of the church

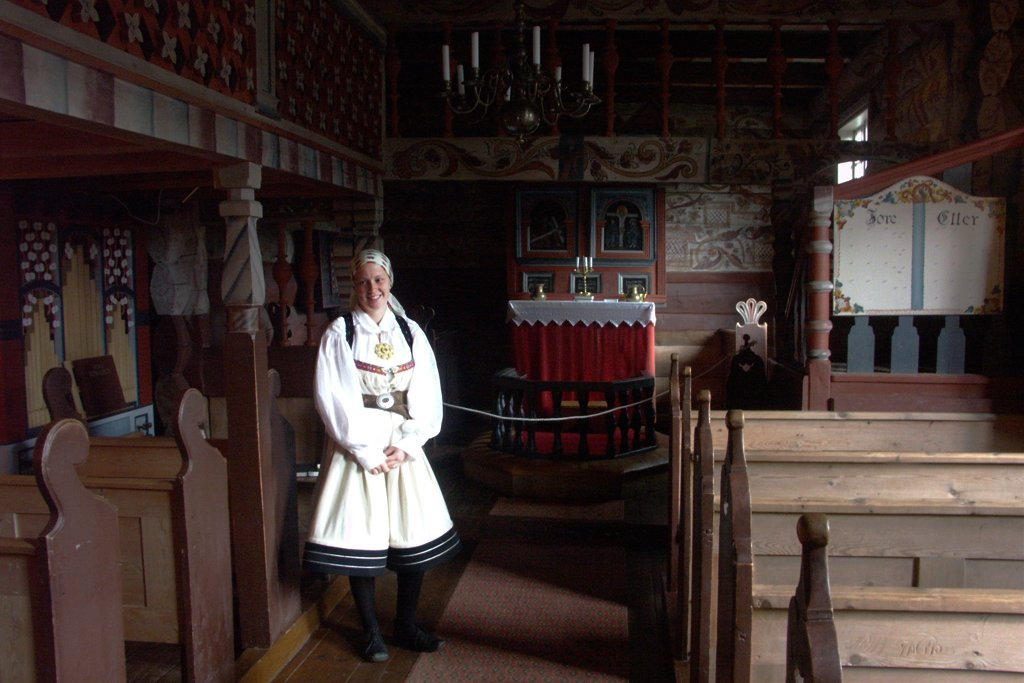
Interior with local traditional costume

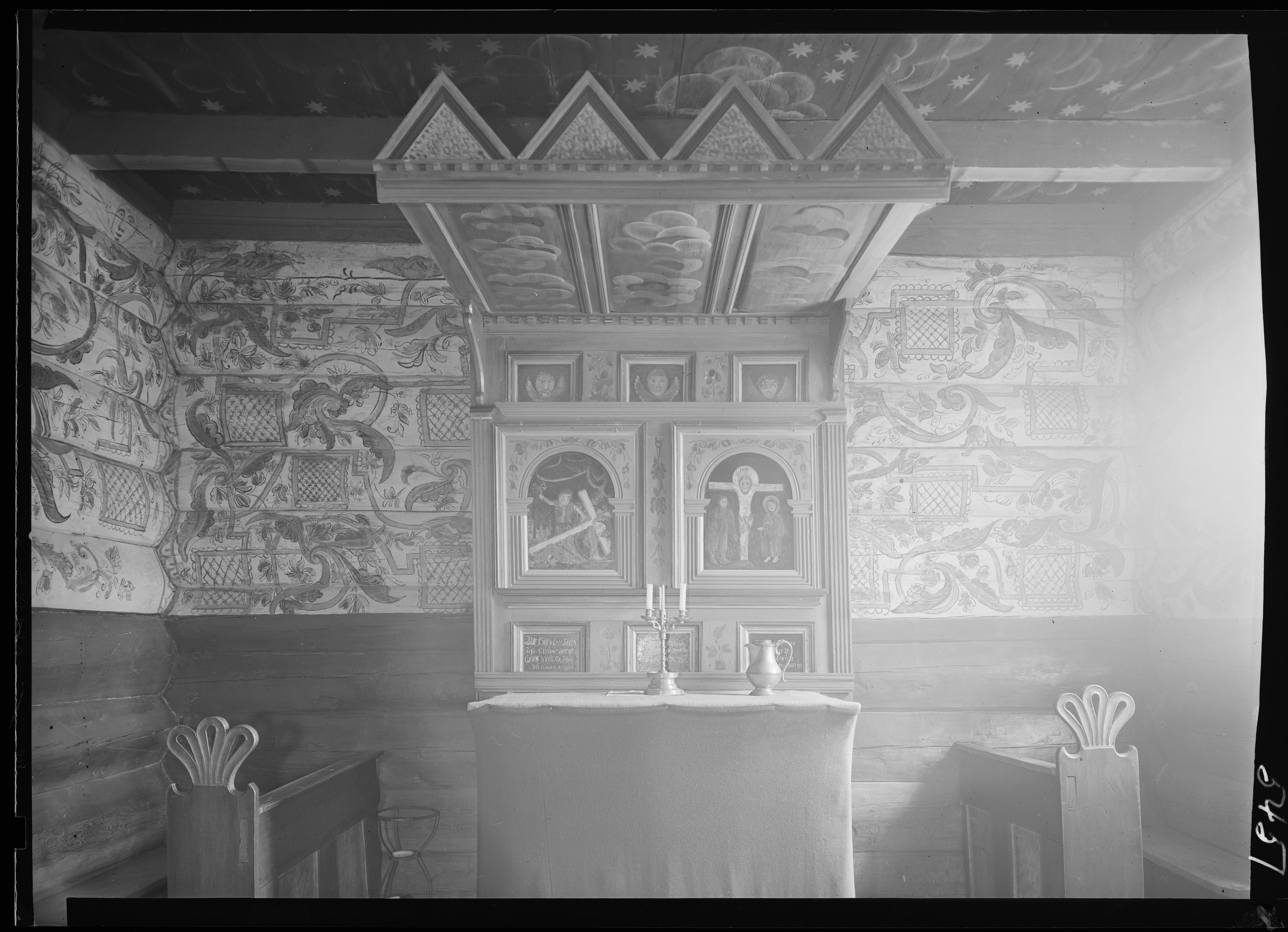
Altar

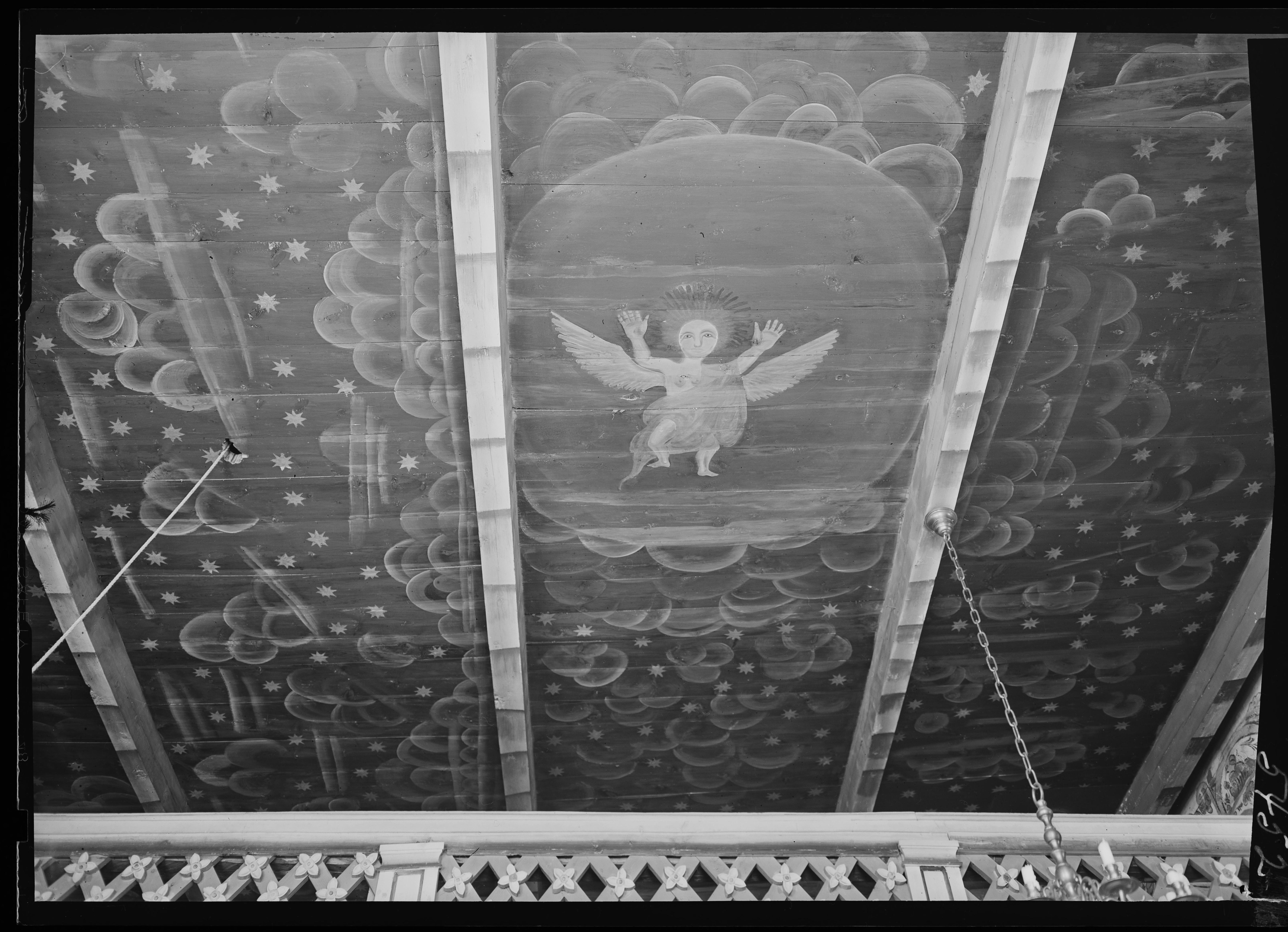
Ceiling

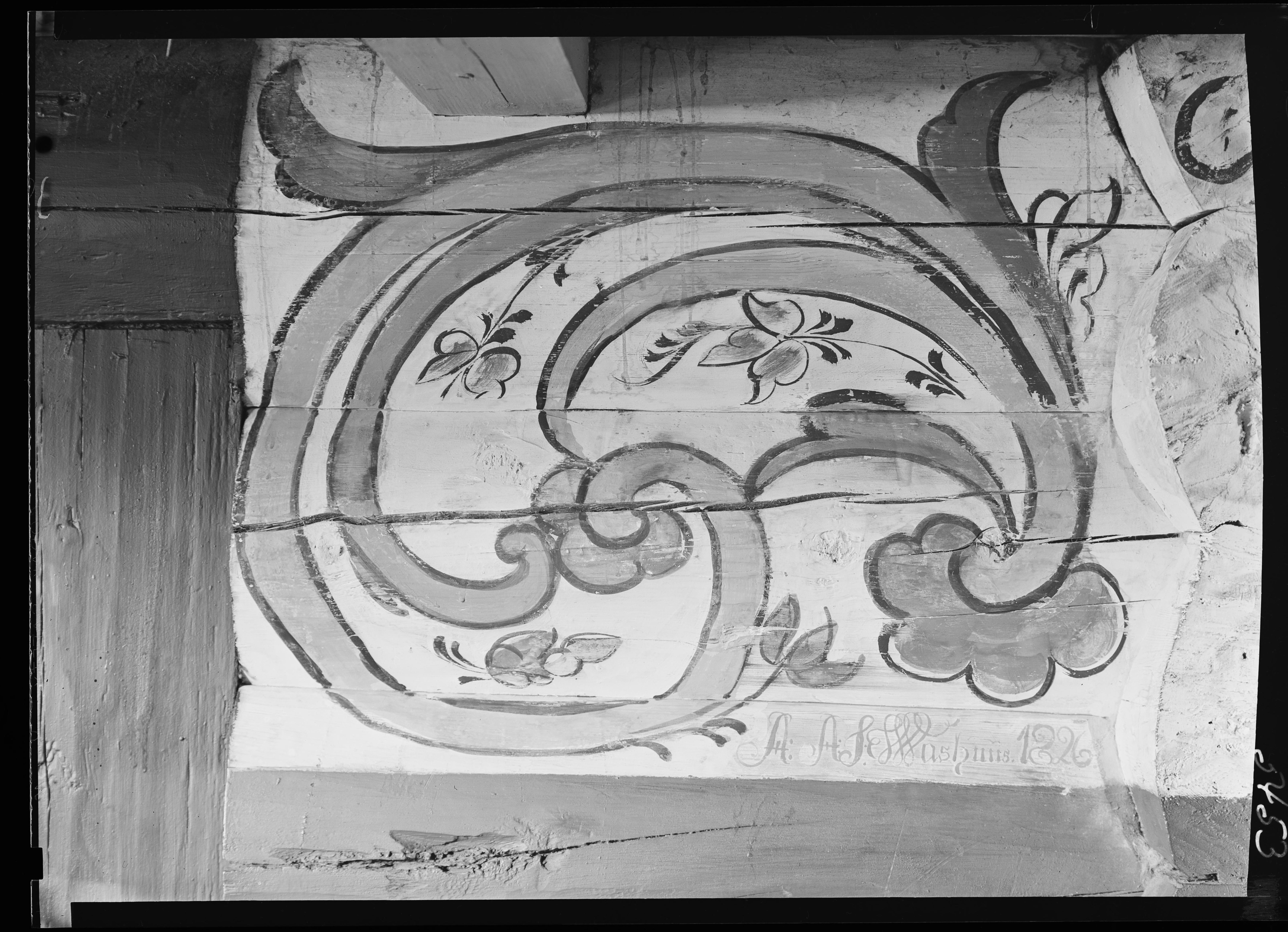
Close up of rosemåling on walls

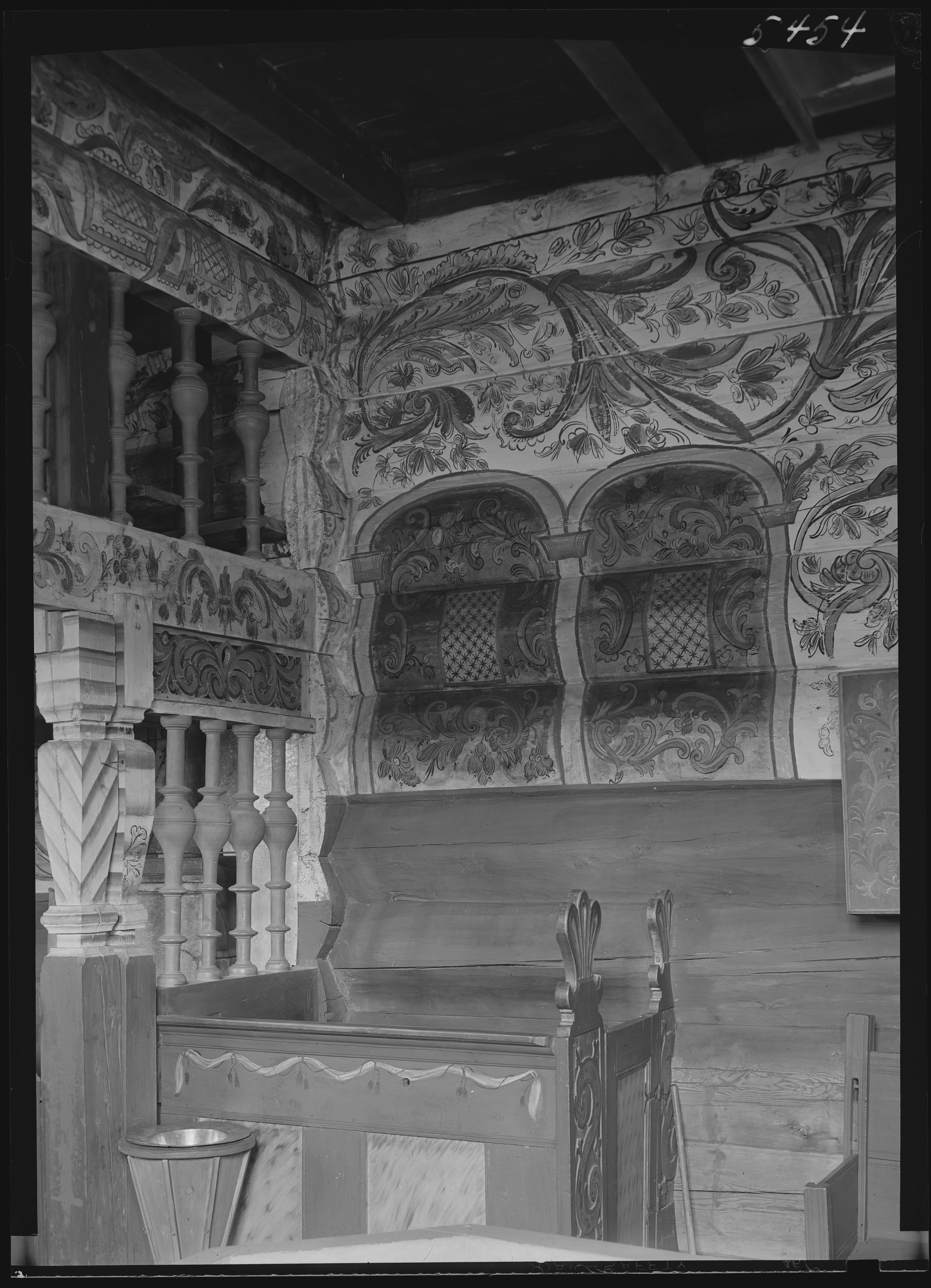
Front of the church

== See also ==
- List of churches in Agder og Telemark
