= Nordbygdi, Agder =

Village in Bykle Municipality, Norway

Nordbygdi
- Village
- Interactive map of Nordbygdi
- Coordinates: 59.34855°N 7.25848°E
- Country: Norway
- Region: Southern Norway
- County: Agder
- District: Setesdal
- Municipality: Bykle Municipality
- Elevation: 603 m (1,978 ft)
- Time zone: UTC+01:00 (CET)
  - Summer (DST): UTC+02:00 (CEST)
- Post Code: 4754 Bykle

Nordbygdi is a village in Bykle Municipality in Agder county, Norway. It is located in the Setesdalen valley along the northeastern shore of the lake, Botsvatn. The village is located about 1 kilometre (0.62 mi) west of the village of Bykle and the river Otra, and about 7 kilometres (4.3 mi) south of the lake Reinevatn.

The village includes three farm areas: Nesland, Tveiti, and Holen. Most of the farms and houses in this area were moved away during the late-1970s when the Botsvatn dam was built to create the large lake/reservoir Botsvatn. After the dam, the level of the water rose, covering over areas that were once part of this village area.
