= Bykle Church =

Church in Agder, Norway

- Bykle kyrkje
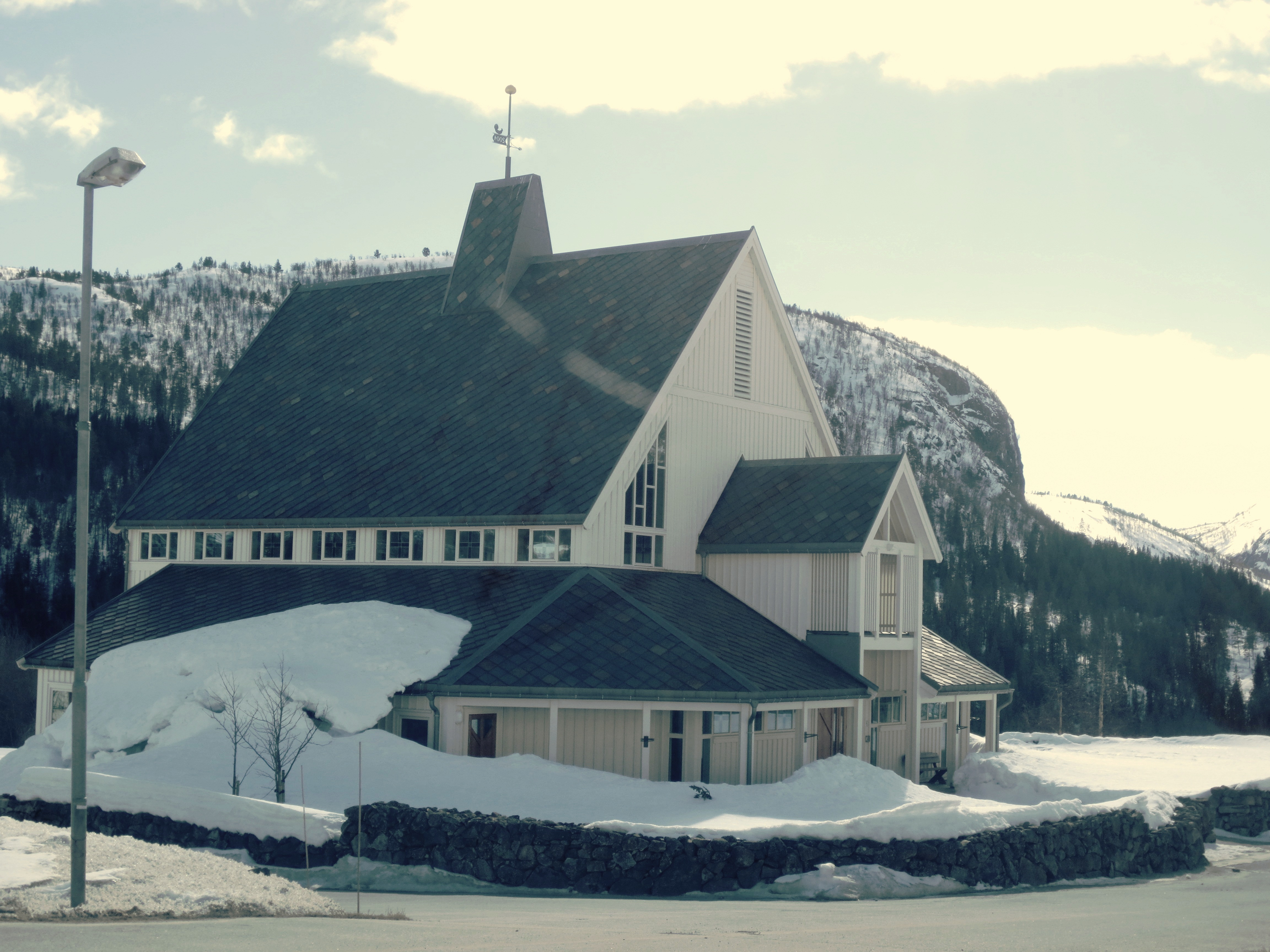
- View of the church
- Bykle Church
- 59.3513°N 07.3432°E
- Location: Bykle Municipality, Agder
- Country: Norway
- Denomination: Church of Norway
- Churchmanship: Evangelical Lutheran

History
- Status: Parish church
- Consecrated: 4 Sept 2004

Architecture
- Functional status: Active
- Architect: Hans Olaf Aanensen
- Architectural type: Long church
- Groundbreaking: 1 Jan 2000
- Completed: 2004 (22 years ago)

Specifications
- Capacity: 220
- Materials: Wood

Administration
- Diocese: Agder og Telemark
- Deanery: Otredal prosti
- Parish: Bykle

Bykle Church (Norwegian: Bykle kyrkje) is a parish church of the Church of Norway in Bykle Municipality in Agder county, Norway. It is located in the village of Bykle. It is one of the churches for the Bykle parish which is part of the Otredal prosti (deanery) in the Diocese of Agder og Telemark. The white, wooden church was built in a long church design in 2004 using plans drawn up by the architect Hans Olaf Aanensen from Arendal. The church seats about 220 people.

== History ==
In the late 20th century, the Old Bykle Church (then known as Bykle Church) was deemed to be too old and small for the local congregation, so a new church building was commissioned. Bishop Olav Skjevesland laid the foundation stone for the new Bykle Church on 1 January 2000. The church was consecrated on 4 September 2004 by Bishop Skjevesland and it was named Bykle Church and the old church was renamed Old Bykle Church.

== Media gallery ==
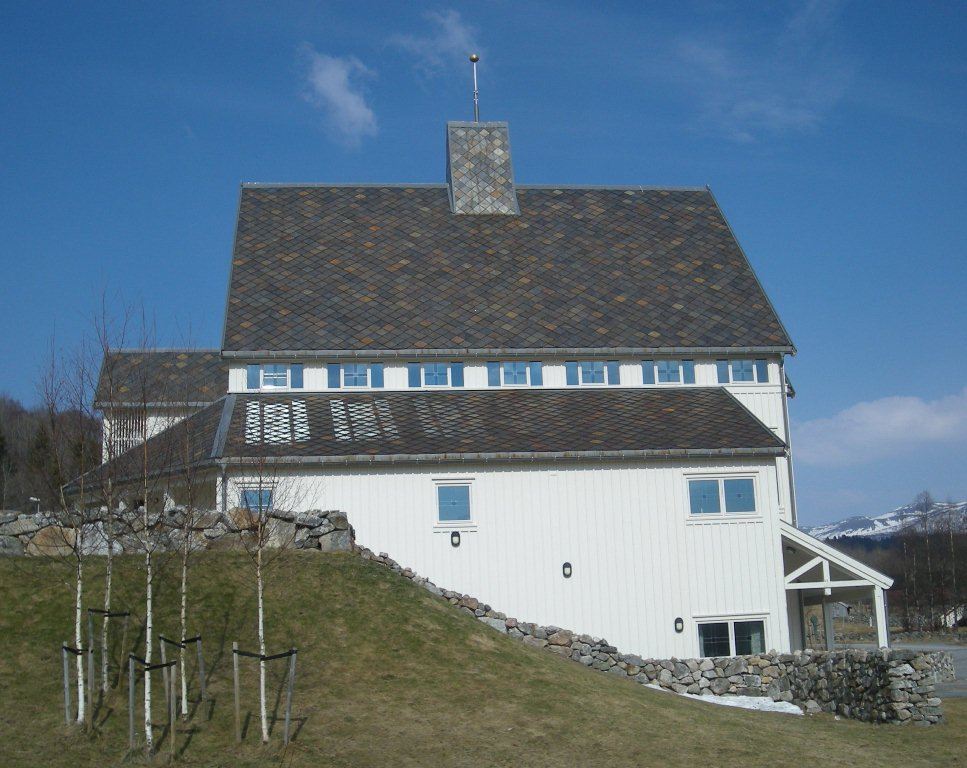

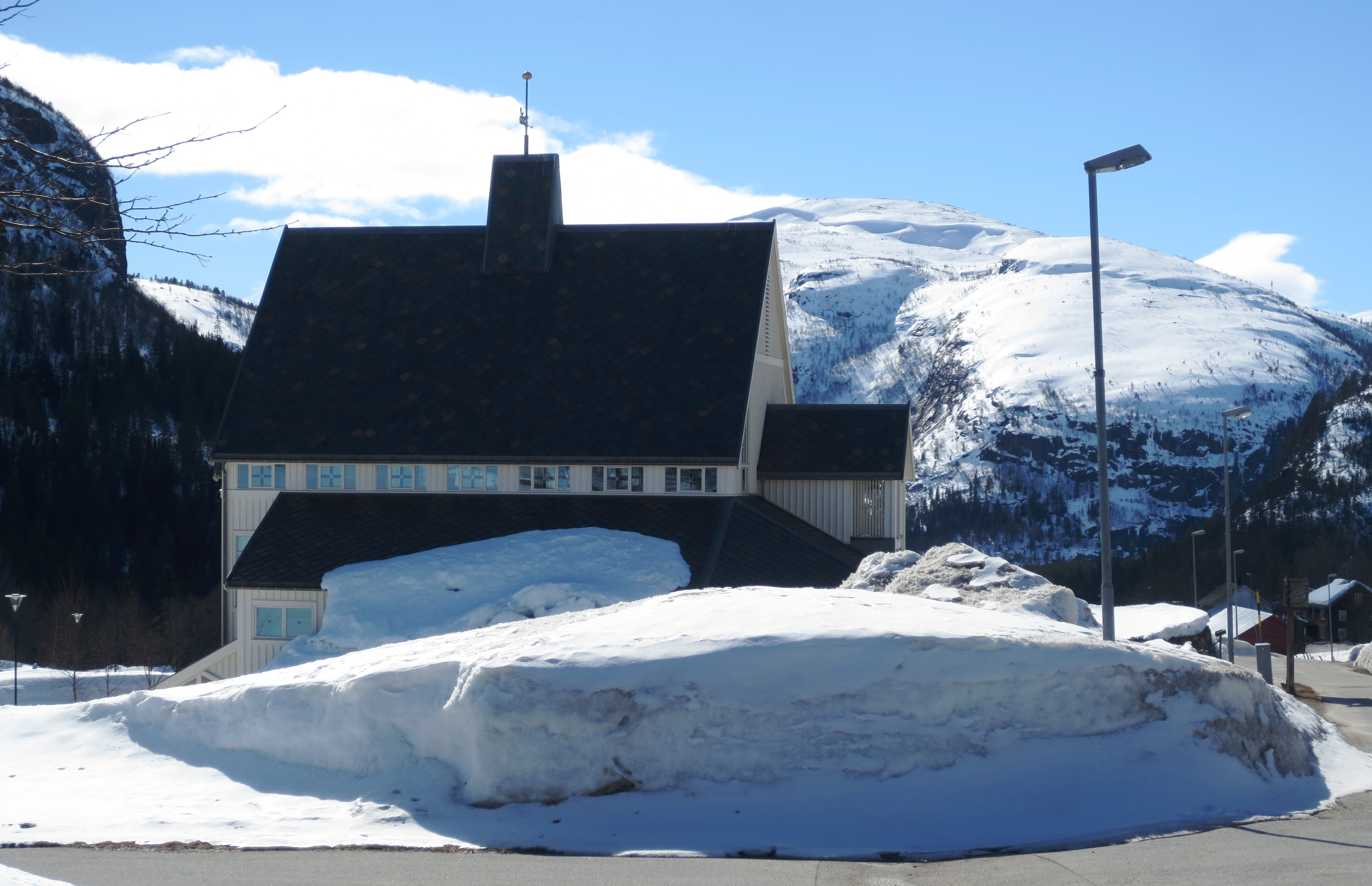

== See also ==
- List of churches in Agder og Telemark
