= Bykle Municipality =

Municipality in Agder, Norway

Bykle Municipality Bykle kommune
- Municipality
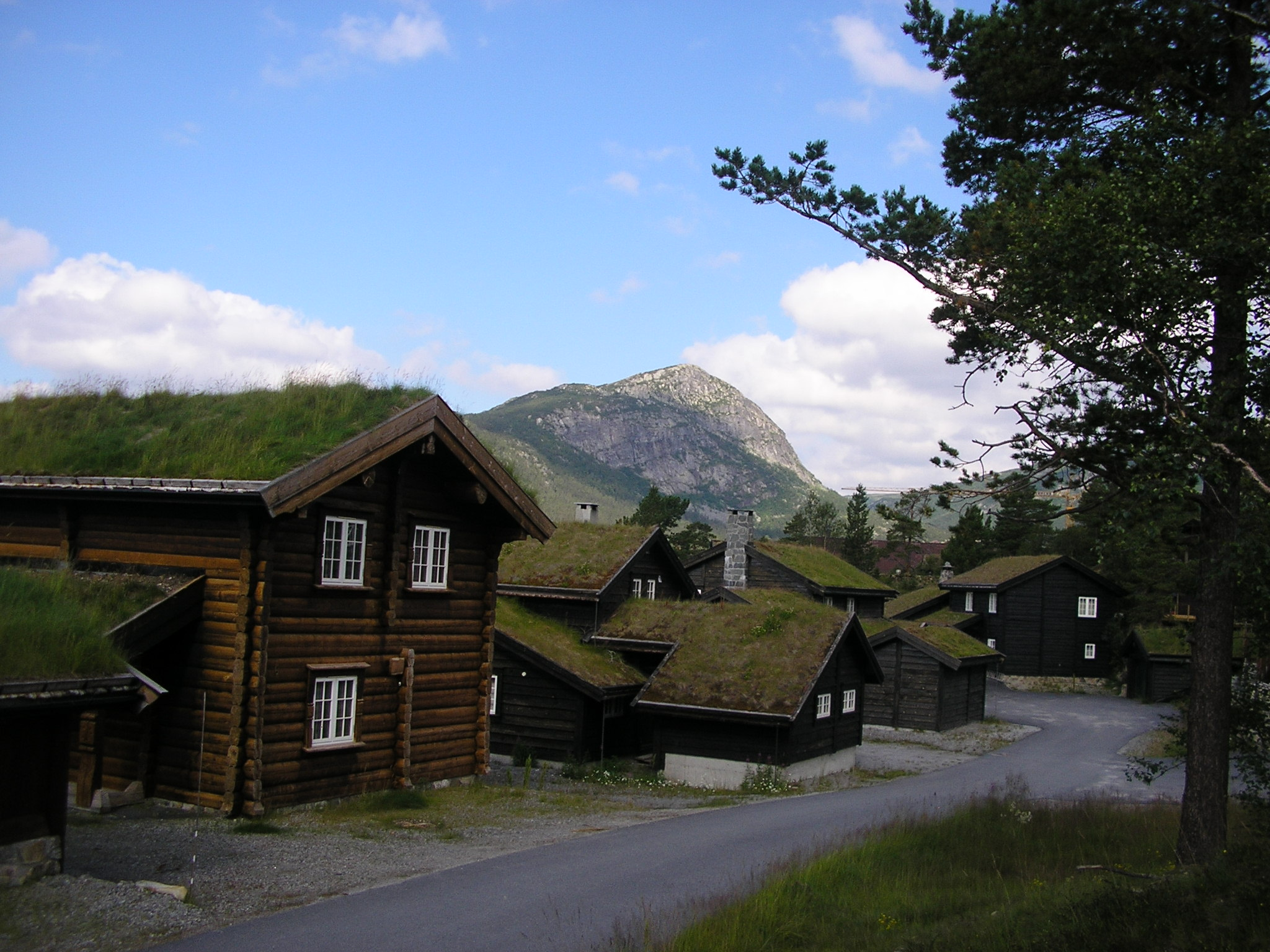
- Cabins in Hovden

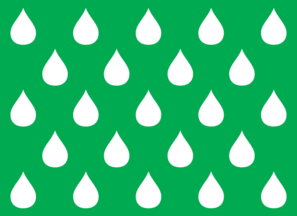
- Flag Coat of arms

- Agder within Norway

- Bykle within Agder
- Coordinates: 59°26′35″N 07°15′18″E
- Country: Norway
- County: Agder
- District: Setesdal
- Established: 1 Jan 1902
  - Preceded by: Valle Municipality
- Administrative centre: Bykle

Government
  - Mayor (2023): Hans Blattmann (Ap)

Area
  - Total: 1,467.10 km^{2} (566.45 sq mi)
  - Land: 1,253.93 km^{2} (484.15 sq mi)
  - Water: 213.17 km^{2} (82.31 sq mi) 14.5%
  - Rank: #60 in Norway
- Highest elevation: 1,506.83 m (4,943.7 ft)

Population (2026)
  - Total: 1,057
  - Rank: #332 in Norway
  - Density: 0.7/km^{2} (1.8/sq mi)
  - Change (10 years): ▲ +11.9%
- Demonym(s): Byklar (N); Bykler (B)

Official language
  - Norwegian form: Nynorsk
- Time zone: UTC+01:00 (CET)
  - Summer (DST): UTC+02:00 (CEST)
- ISO 3166 code: NO-4222
- Website: Official website

Bykle is a municipality in Agder county, Norway. It is located in the traditional district of Setesdal. The administrative centre of the municipality is the village of Bykle. Other villages in Bykle Municipality include Berdalen, Bjåen, Breive, Hoslemo, Hovden, and Nordbygdi. Bykle Municipality was established as a municipality on 1 January 1902 when it was separated from Valle Municipality.

The 1,467.1-square-kilometre (566.5 sq mi) municipality is the 60th largest by area out of the 357 municipalities in Norway. Bykle Municipality is the 332nd most populous municipality in Norway with a population of 1,057. The municipality's population density is 0.7 inhabitants per square kilometre (1.8/sq mi) and its population has increased by 11.9% over the previous 10-year period.

== General information ==
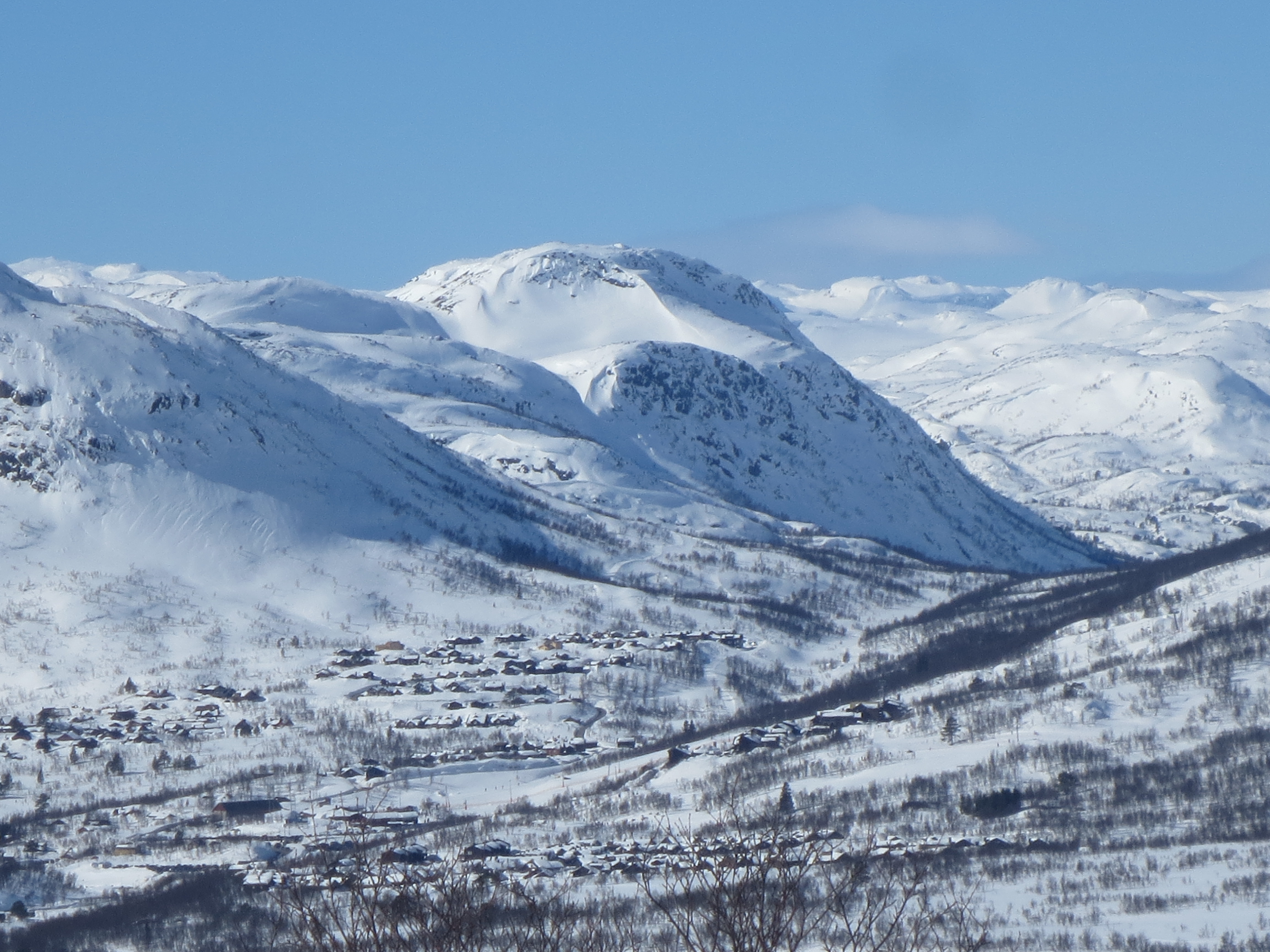
View of the village of Hovden in winter

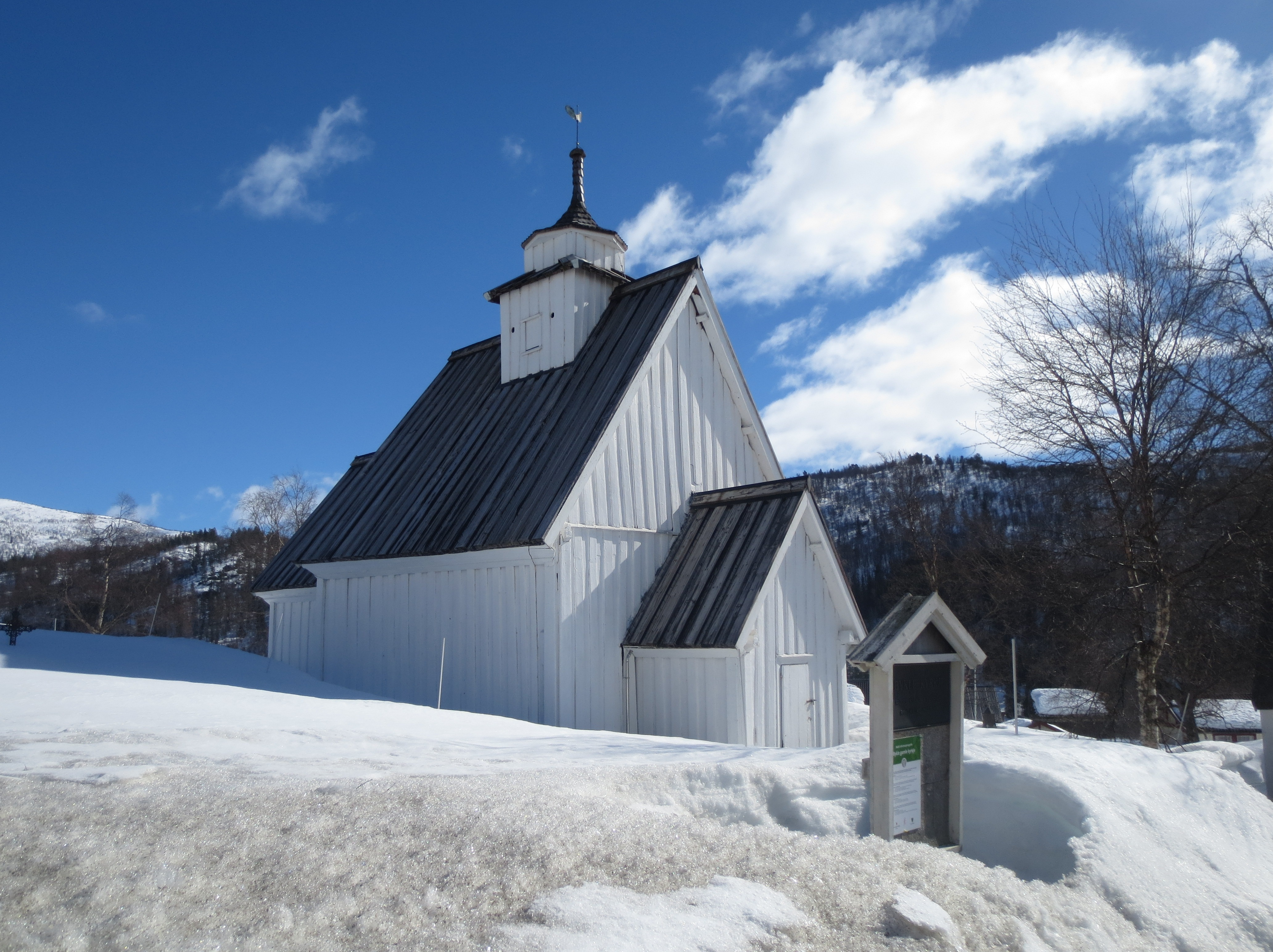
View of the Old Bykle Church

The municipality of Bykle was created when it was separated from the older Valle Municipality on 1 January 1902 after a dispute over the costs of road building (Bykle was the bigger area, while Valle had more people and more money). Initially, Bykle Municipality had a population of 476 residents in the new municipality. The boundaries of the municipality have not changed since that time.

In 2020, there were many municipal and county mergers across Norway due to the work of the Solberg cabinet. Historically, this municipality was part of the old Aust-Agder county. On 1 January 2020, the municipality became a part of the newly-formed Agder county (after Aust-Agder and Vest-Agder counties were merged).

=== Name ===
The municipality (originally the parish) is named after the old Byklum farm (Old Norse: Byklar) since the first Bykle Church was built there. The farm is named after Lake Bykil, but the meaning of that name is uncertain. The name possibly comes from the word bauka which means "to splash" or "to slosh". Historically, the name has been spelled Bøgle or Bøckle, but the spelling has been Bykle since the 19th century.

=== Coat of arms ===
The coat of arms was granted on 4 April 1986. The official blazon is "Vert, goutte d'eau" (Norwegian: Grøn grunn strødd med sølv dropar). This means the arms have a green field (background) and the charge is droplets of water that are equally spaced all over the shield. The water droplets have a tincture of argent which means they are commonly colored white, but if it is made out of metal, then silver is used. The green color in the field symbolizes the importance of agriculture in the municipality. The water droplets were chosen as a symbol for the water and rivers in the municipality, as well as for the hydropower plant which was founded in 1915. The plant has brought prosperity to the area since then. The arms were designed by Daniel Rike. The municipal flag has the same design as the coat of arms.

=== Churches ===
The Church of Norway has one parish (sokn) within Bykle Municipality. It is part of the Otredal prosti (deanery) in the Diocese of Agder og Telemark.

Churches in Bykle Municipality
Parish (sokn)	Church name	Location of the church	Year built
Bykle	Bykle Church	Bykle	2004
Bykle	Old Bykle Church	Bykle	1619
Bykle	Fjellgardane Church	Hovden	1955

== Geography ==
Bykle Municipality sits in the northern part of the Setesdalen valley. It is bordered to the north by Vinje Municipality and to the east by Tokke Municipality (both of which are in Telemark county). It is bordered to the south by Valle Municipality and Sirdal Municipality (both in Agder county). It is bordered in the southwest by Sandnes Municipality and in the west by Hjelmeland Municipality and Suldal Municipality (both in Rogaland county).

There are many lakes that are located within the mountainous municipality including Blåsjø, Botsvatn, Hartevatnet, Holmavatnet, Ormsavatnet, Reinevatn, Skyvatn, Store Urevatn, Svartevatnet, and Vatndalsvatnet, and Ytre Storevatnet.

The Setesdalsheiene mountain range runs through the municipality, including the tallest mountain in that range, Sæbyggjenuten at 1,506.83 metres (4,943.7 ft), the highest point in the municipality. The Byklestigen pass is a torturous trail up a steep cliff face. Until the 1870s, it was the only route to reach Bykle Municipality from the middle Setesdal valley to the south. It runs above the river Otra and was the site of numerous accidents on the hazardous route. The eastern side of the valley (and the municipal/county border) is lined by the mountains Gråsteinsnosi, Brandsnutene, Svolhusgreini, Sæbyggjenuten, and Støylsdalsnutene. The western side of the valley (and the municipal/county border) is lined by the mountains Storhellernuten, Skyvassnuten, Sveigen, and Kaldafjellet. The southern border of the municipality is marked by the mountain Steinheii. The mountains Urevassnutene, Djuptjønnuten, Snjoheinuten, and Kvervetjønnuten mark the highlands in the southwestern part of the municipality, northwest of the village of Bykle.

=== Climate ===
Climate data for Hovden - Lundane 1991–2020 (841 m, avg highs/lows 2003-2025)
Month	Jan	Feb	Mar	Apr	May	Jun	Jul	Aug	Sep	Oct	Nov	Dec	Year
Mean daily maximum °C (°F)	−3.1 (26.4)	−2.1 (28.2)	1.4 (34.5)	5.3 (41.5)	9.6 (49.3)	14.7 (58.5)	16.7 (62.1)	15.5 (59.9)	11.9 (53.4)	6.3 (43.3)	1.5 (34.7)	−1.7 (28.9)	6.3 (43.4)
Daily mean °C (°F)	−6.5 (20.3)	−7 (19)	−4.8 (23.4)	−0.6 (30.9)	3.9 (39.0)	8.5 (47.3)	11.4 (52.5)	10.3 (50.5)	6.7 (44.1)	1.7 (35.1)	−2.3 (27.9)	−6 (21)	1.3 (34.3)
Mean daily minimum °C (°F)	−12 (10)	−12.5 (9.5)	−10 (14)	−5.4 (22.3)	−0.7 (30.7)	3 (37)	5.5 (41.9)	5 (41)	2.7 (36.9)	−1.5 (29.3)	−6.1 (21.0)	−10.1 (13.8)	−3.5 (25.6)
Average precipitation mm (inches)	112 (4.4)	73 (2.9)	64 (2.5)	44 (1.7)	49 (1.9)	62 (2.4)	75 (3.0)	86 (3.4)	88 (3.5)	102 (4.0)	104 (4.1)	101 (4.0)	960 (37.8)
Average precipitation days (≥ 1.0 mm)	19	16	15	12	10	12	12	15	17	17	18	19	182
Source 1: yr.no
Source 2: National Oceanic and Atmospheric Administration (precipitation days)

== Economy ==
Bykle Municipality has several hydroelectric power generation facilities. The second-largest sector of income for the municipality is the alpine skiing facility in Hovden. Due to its vast amount of hydroelectric power, Bykle Municipality is now the wealthiest of the municipalities in Setesdal.

== Government ==
Bykle Municipality is responsible for primary education (through 10th grade), outpatient health services, senior citizen services, welfare and other social services, zoning, economic development, and municipal roads and utilities. The municipality is governed by a municipal council of directly elected representatives. The mayor is indirectly elected by a vote of the municipal council. The municipality is under the jurisdiction of the Agder District Court and the Agder Court of Appeal.

=== Municipal council ===
The municipal council (Kommunestyre) of Bykle Municipality is made up of 13 representatives that are elected to four year terms. The tables below show the current and historical composition of the council by political party.

Bykle kommunestyre 2023–2027
Party name (in Nynorsk)	Number of representatives
Labour Party (Arbeidarpartiet)	4
Conservative Party (Høgre)	3
Christian Democratic Party (Kristeleg Folkeparti)	1
Centre Party (Senterpartiet)	2
Liberal Party (Venstre)	2
Bykle Local List (Bykle Bygdeliste)	1
Total number of members:	13

Bykle kommunestyre 2019–2023
Party name (in Nynorsk)	Number of representatives
Labour Party (Arbeidarpartiet)	4
Conservative Party (Høgre)	3
Christian Democratic Party (Kristeleg Folkeparti)	1
Centre Party (Senterpartiet)	3
Liberal Party (Venstre)	2
Total number of members:	13

Bykle kommunestyre 2015–2019
Party name (in Nynorsk)	Number of representatives
Labour Party (Arbeidarpartiet)	6
Conservative Party (Høgre)	2
Christian Democratic Party (Kristeleg Folkeparti)	1
Centre Party (Senterpartiet)	2
Liberal Party (Venstre)	2
Total number of members:	13

Bykle kommunestyre 2011–2015
Party name (in Nynorsk)	Number of representatives
Labour Party (Arbeidarpartiet)	5
Progress Party (Framstegspartiet)	1
Conservative Party (Høgre)	4
Centre Party (Senterpartiet)	2
Liberal Party (Venstre)	1
Total number of members:	13

Bykle kommunestyre 2007–2011
Party name (in Nynorsk)	Number of representatives
Labour Party (Arbeidarpartiet)	3
Progress Party (Framstegspartiet)	1
Conservative Party (Høgre)	4
Christian Democratic Party (Kristeleg Folkeparti)	1
Centre Party (Senterpartiet)	1
Socialist Left Party (Sosialistisk Venstreparti)	1
Liberal Party (Venstre)	1
Bykle local list (Bykle bygdeliste)	1
Total number of members:	13

Bykle kommunestyre 2003–2007
Party name (in Nynorsk)	Number of representatives
Labour Party (Arbeidarpartiet)	3
Conservative Party (Høgre)	4
Christian Democratic Party (Kristeleg Folkeparti)	1
Centre Party (Senterpartiet)	1
Socialist Left Party (Sosialistisk Venstreparti)	1
Liberal Party (Venstre)	1
Bykle local list (Bykle Bygdeliste)	2
Total number of members:	13

Bykle kommunestyre 1999–2003
Party name (in Nynorsk)	Number of representatives
Labour Party (Arbeidarpartiet)	3
Conservative Party (Høgre)	4
Centre Party (Senterpartiet)	2
Liberal Party (Venstre)	3
Bykle local list (Bykle bygdeliste)	1
Total number of members:	13

Bykle kommunestyre 1995–1999
Party name (in Nynorsk)	Number of representatives
Labour Party (Arbeidarpartiet)	4
Conservative Party (Høgre)	1
Christian Democratic Party (Kristeleg Folkeparti)	1
Centre Party (Senterpartiet)	2
Liberal Party (Venstre)	3
Bykle local list (Bykle Bygdeliste)	2
Total number of members:	13

Bykle kommunestyre 1991–1995
Party name (in Nynorsk)	Number of representatives
Labour Party (Arbeidarpartiet)	5
Conservative Party (Høgre)	1
Christian Democratic Party (Kristeleg Folkeparti)	1
Centre Party (Senterpartiet)	3
Liberal Party (Venstre)	2
Bykle local list (Bykle Bygdelist)	1
Total number of members:	13

Bykle kommunestyre 1987–1991
Party name (in Nynorsk)	Number of representatives
Labour Party (Arbeidarpartiet)	5
Conservative Party (Høgre)	2
Christian Democratic Party (Kristeleg Folkeparti)	1
Centre Party (Senterpartiet)	3
Bykle local list (Bykle Bygdeliste)	2
Total number of members:	13

Bykle kommunestyre 1983–1987
Party name (in Nynorsk)	Number of representatives
Labour Party (Arbeidarpartiet)	4
Conservative Party (Høgre)	3
Christian Democratic Party (Kristeleg Folkeparti)	1
Centre Party (Senterpartiet)	2
Bykle local list (Bykle Bygdeliste)	3
Total number of members:	13

Bykle kommunestyre 1979–1983
Party name (in Nynorsk)	Number of representatives
Labour Party (Arbeidarpartiet)	5
Conservative Party (Høgre)	3
Christian Democratic Party (Kristeleg Folkeparti)	2
Centre Party (Senterpartiet)	3
Total number of members:	13

Bykle kommunestyre 1975–1979
Party name (in Nynorsk)	Number of representatives
Labour Party (Arbeidarpartiet)	5
Christian Democratic Party (Kristeleg Folkeparti)	3
Centre Party (Senterpartiet)	5
Total number of members:	13

Bykle kommunestyre 1971–1975
Party name (in Nynorsk)	Number of representatives
Labour Party (Arbeidarpartiet)	5
Christian Democratic Party (Kristeleg Folkeparti)	2
Centre Party (Senterpartiet)	6
Total number of members:	13

Bykle kommunestyre 1967–1971
Party name (in Nynorsk)	Number of representatives
Labour Party (Arbeidarpartiet)	6
Christian Democratic Party (Kristeleg Folkeparti)	2
Centre Party (Senterpartiet)	5
Total number of members:	13

Bykle kommunestyre 1963–1967
Party name (in Nynorsk)	Number of representatives
Labour Party (Arbeidarpartiet)	6
Christian Democratic Party (Kristeleg Folkeparti)	2
Centre Party (Senterpartiet)	5
Total number of members:	13

Bykle heradsstyre 1959–1963
Party name (in Nynorsk)	Number of representatives
Labour Party (Arbeidarpartiet)	6
Centre Party (Senterpartiet)	7
Total number of members:	13

Bykle heradsstyre 1955–1959
Party name (in Nynorsk)	Number of representatives
Labour Party (Arbeidarpartiet)	6
Joint List(s) of Non-Socialist Parties (Borgarlege Felleslister)	7
Total number of members:	13

Bykle heradsstyre 1951–1955
Party name (in Nynorsk)	Number of representatives
Labour Party (Arbeidarpartiet)	5
Joint List(s) of Non-Socialist Parties (Borgarlege Felleslister)	7
Total number of members:	12

Bykle heradsstyre 1947–1951
Party name (in Nynorsk)	Number of representatives
List of workers, fishermen, and small farmholders (Arbeidarar, fiskarar, småbrukarar liste)	5
Joint List(s) of Non-Socialist Parties (Borgarlege Felleslister)	7
Total number of members:	12

Bykle heradsstyre 1945–1947
Party name (in Nynorsk)	Number of representatives
Labour Party (Arbeidarpartiet)	6
Local List(s) (Lokale lister)	6
Total number of members:	12

Bykle heradsstyre 1937–1941*
Party name (in Nynorsk)	Number of representatives
Labour Party (Arbeidarpartiet)	3
Joint List(s) of Non-Socialist Parties (Borgarlege Felleslister)	9
Total number of members:	12
Note: Due to the German occupation of Norway during World War II, no elections were held for new municipal councils until after the war ended in 1945.

=== Politics ===
Bykle Municipality has been run by one mayor, Kai Jeiskelid, from 1985 until 2011. In September 2011, a new mayor was elected: Jon-Rolf Næss. Due to a law implemented 50 years ago by the Labour Party, the obligation of politicians' residence in this municipality is required.

=== Mayors ===
The mayor (Nynorsk: ordførar) of Bykle Municipality is the political leader of the municipality and the chairperson of the municipal council. The following people have held this position:

- 1902–1910: Tarald Drengson Mosdøl
- 1911–1913: Dreng O. Byklum
- 1914–1916: Tarald Drengson Mosdøl
- 1917–1919: Gjermund O. Hoslemo
- 1920–1922: Dreng O. Byklum
- 1926–1925: Knut K. Vatnedalen
- 1926–1928: Åsmund D. Byklum
- 1929–1937: Gjermund O. Hoslemo
- 1938–1942: Åsmund D. Byklum
- 1945–1945: Gjermund O. Hoslemo
- 1945–1945: Olav Knutsson Skarberg
- 1945–1947: Olav G. Holen
- 1948–1951: Åsmund D. Byklum
- 1952–1967: Gunnar Å. Tveiten (Sp)
- 1968–1975: Jon Trydal (Sp)
- 1975–1983: Olav A. Nesland (KrF)
- 1983–1985: Tor Byklum (LL)
- 1985–2011: Kay Jeiskelid (Ap/H)
- 2011–2023: Jon-Rolf Næss (Ap)
- 2023–present: Hans Blattmann (Ap)

== History ==
At Storhedder, north of the lake Storheddervatnet near the mountain Storheddernuten, there are prehistoric runic inscriptions dating over 1000 years old.

The Hovden area was interconnected more with the districts to the west of the mountains than communities further down the Setesdal valley. The main mountain plateau trade route led west to Suldal municipality in Rogaland. The Byklestigen pass was the line of divisions between dialects; in Valle to the south the classic Setesdal tongue was spoken while in Bykle the dialect includes a significant mixture from neighboring Telemark county.

Falcons were trapped in the heights above Bykle. From as early as 1203 and as late as 1780 there are reports of English and Dutch trapping of falcons at Breivik in Bykle. One byproduct of the numerous Dutch visits in the 1560s was the discovery that the natives had no natural resistance to syphilis; a state physician had to be dispatched there to stem the disease.

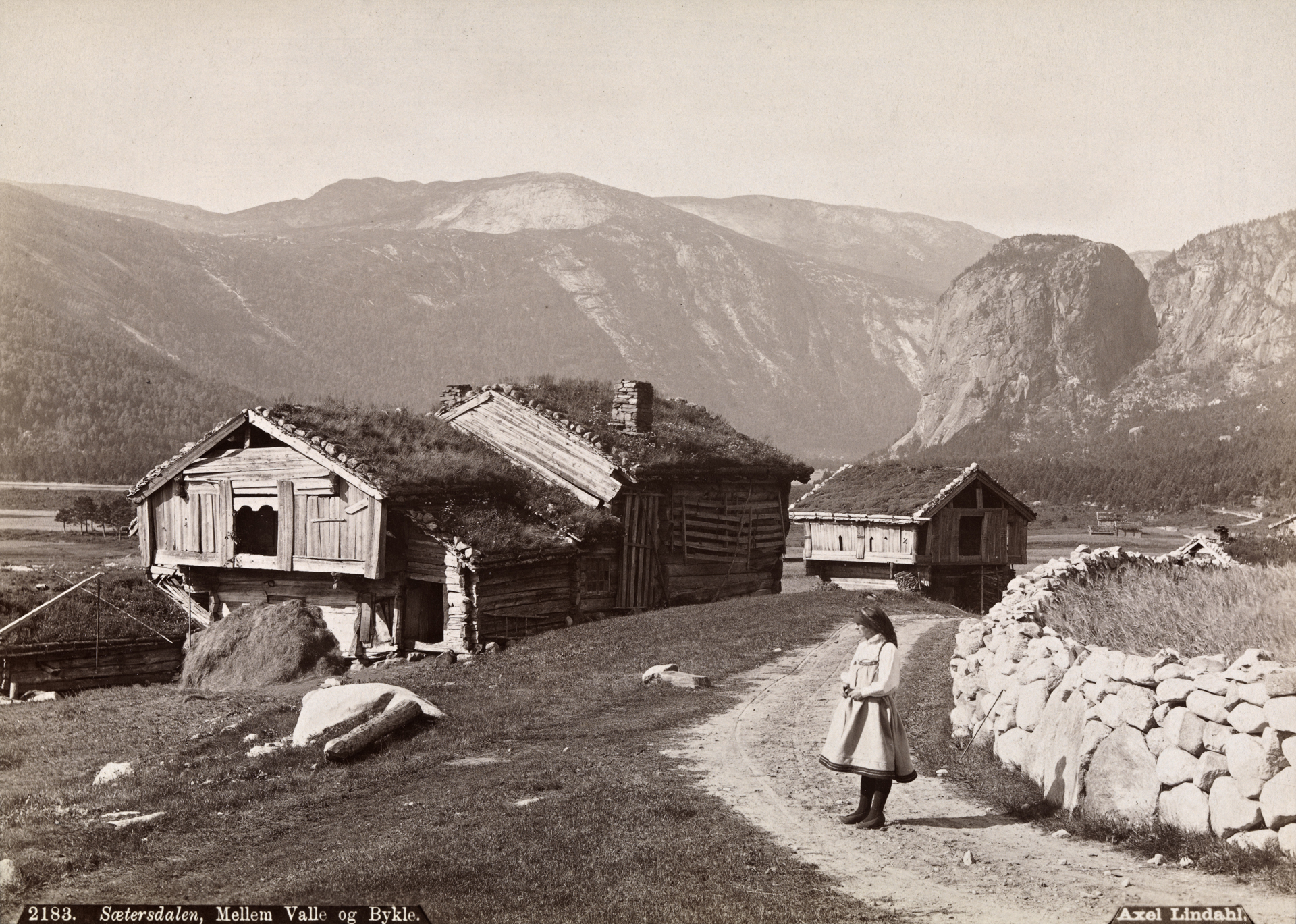
Farm - c. 1885

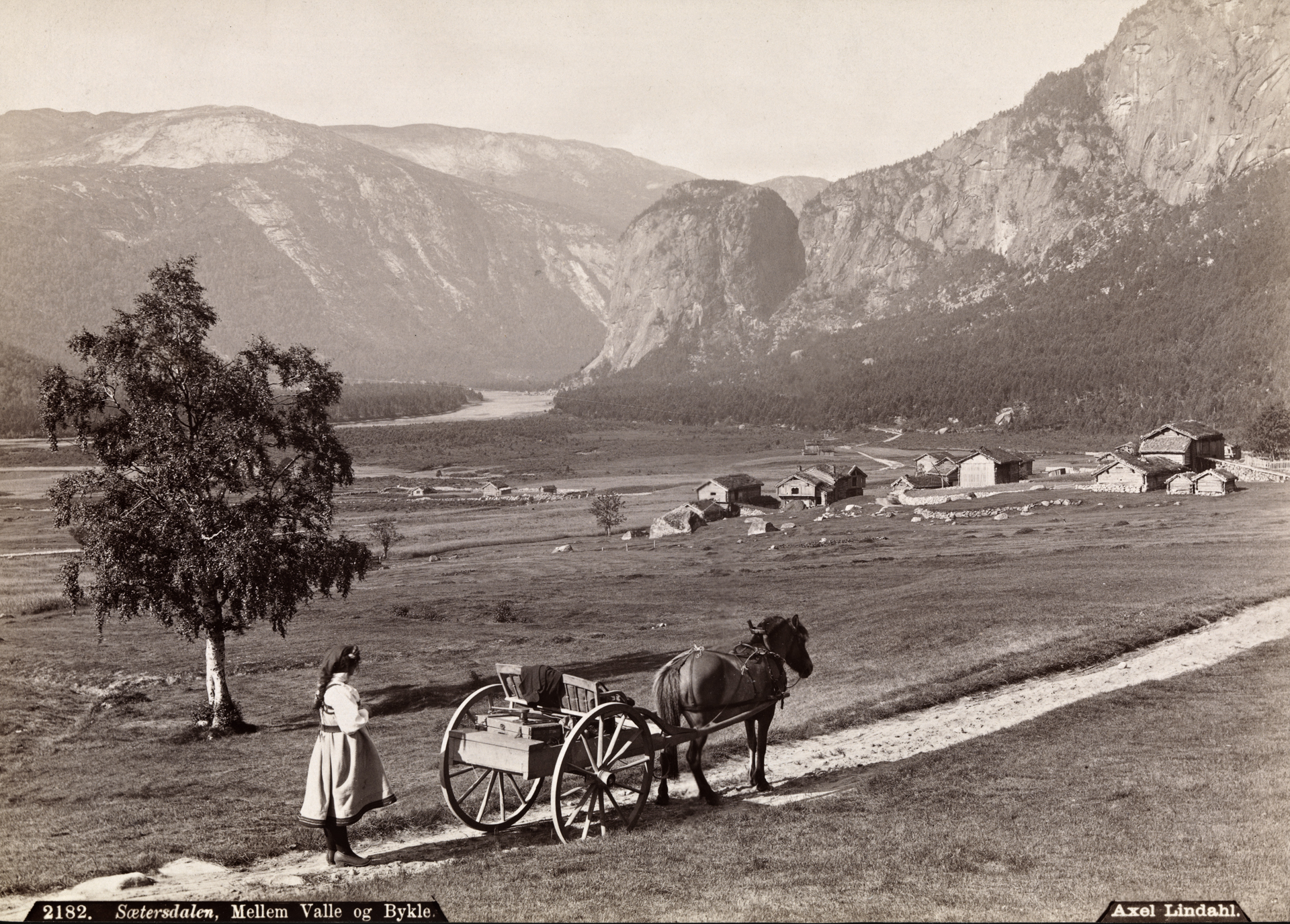
Farm - c. 1885

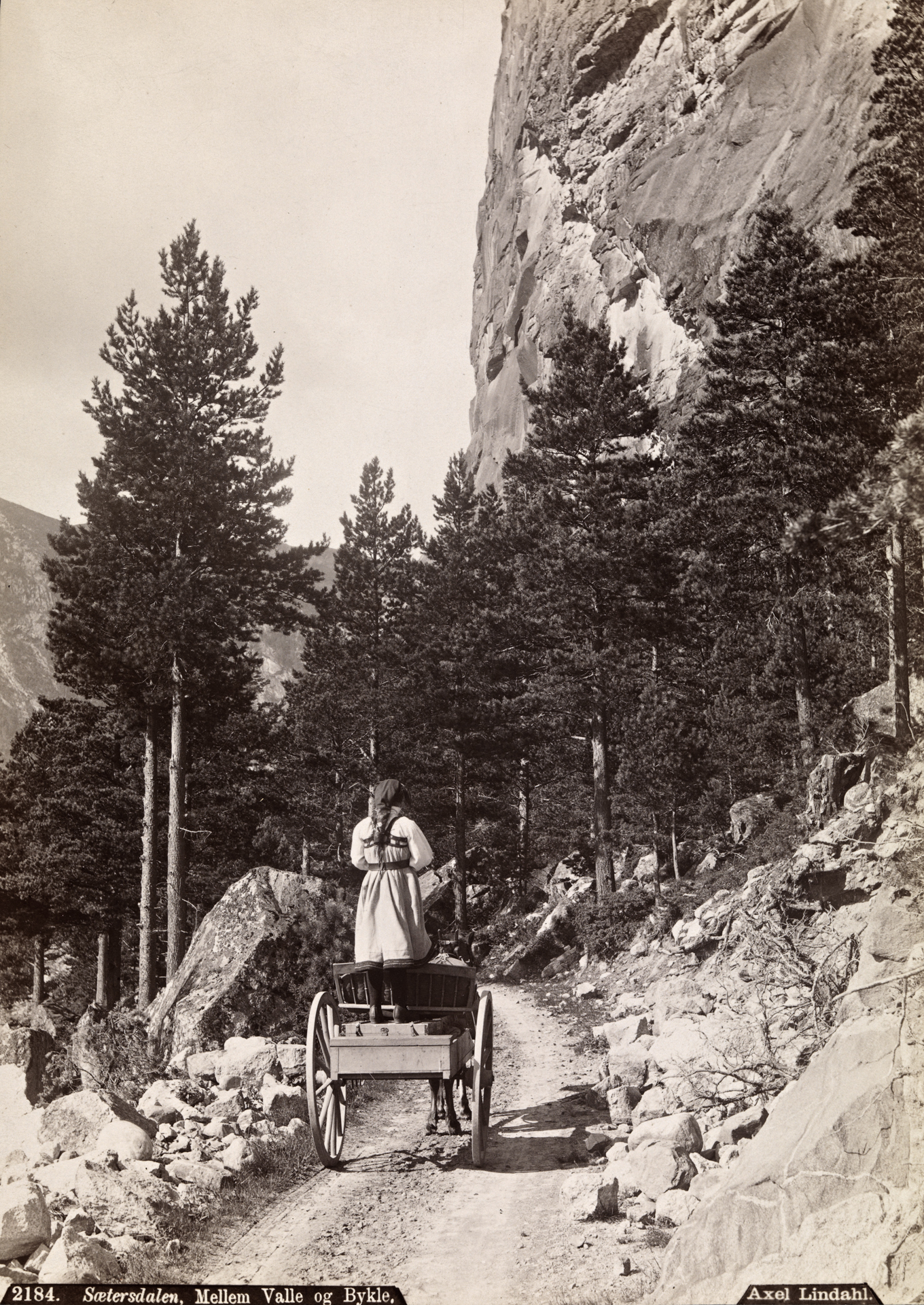
Traveling in Bykle - c. 1885

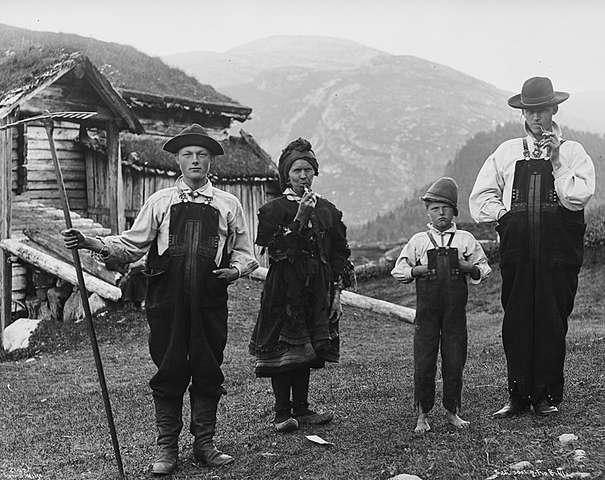
Farming family from Bykle wearing traditional bunads - c. 1885

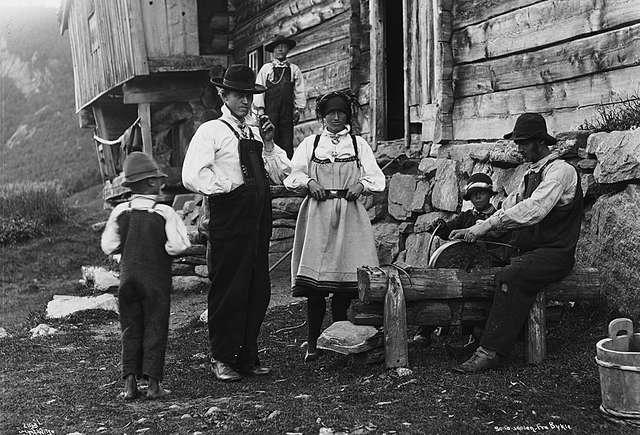
Farming family from Bykle wearing traditional bunads - c. 1885

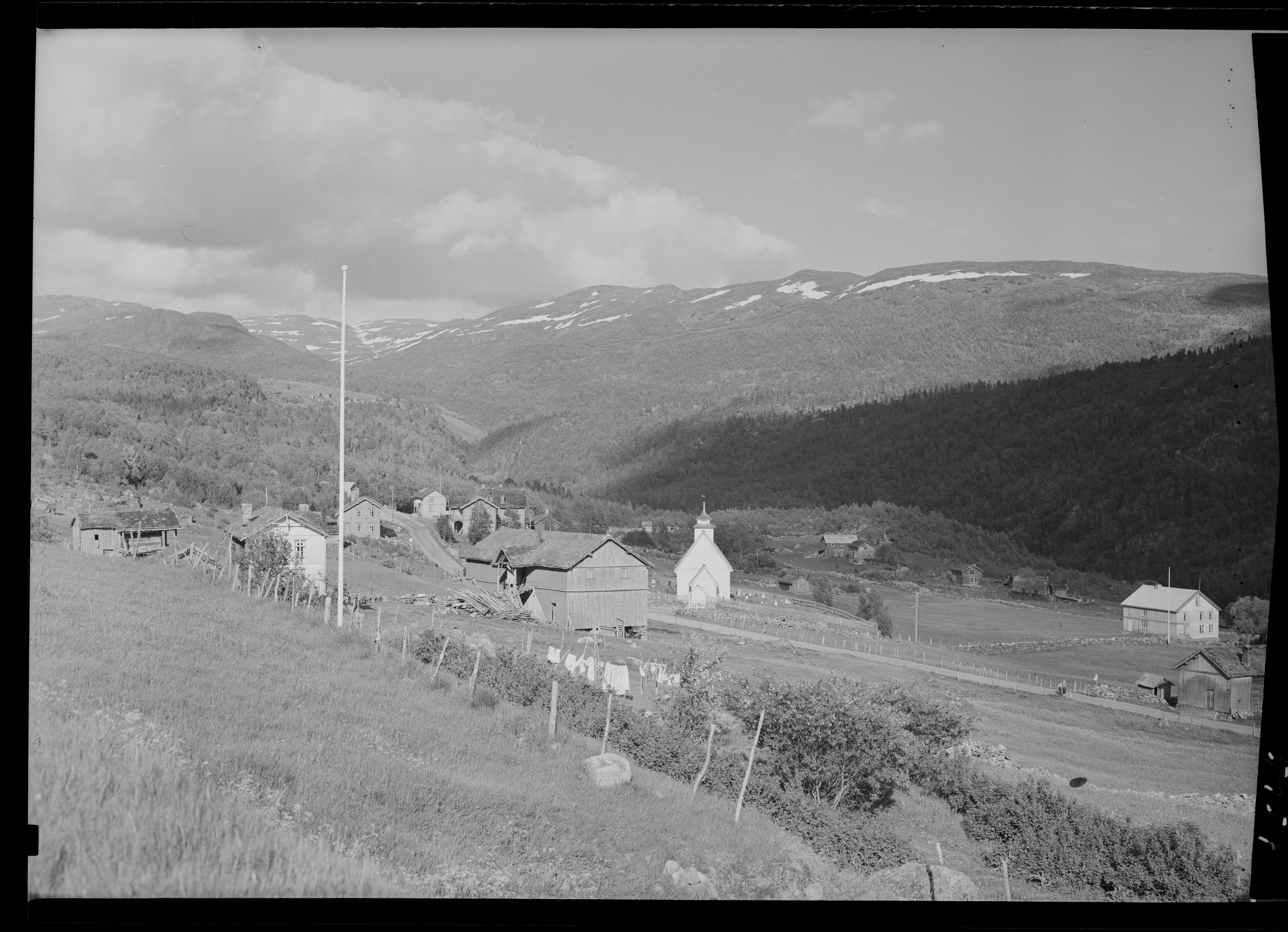
View of the village of Bykle and the Old Bykle Church - 1948

== Attractions ==
- Old Bykle Church, built in 1619, is found in the village of Bykle. It stands on the site of an older stave church
- Open air museums at Huldreheimen and Lislestog.
- Hovden ski resort and village is found in the north along Norwegian National Road 9.
- Viking Age bog iron museum, which recognizes the industry in the area over 1000 years ago, located at Hovden
- Prehistoric runic inscriptions at Storhedder

== Notable people ==
- Tore Segelcke (1901–1979), an actress who bought and restored Huldreheimen in Bykle with her husband, Anton Raabe
