= Holmavatnet (Vinje) =

Lake in south-west Norway

- Interactive map of Holmavatnet
- Location: Bykle, Agder; Suldal, Rogaland; Vinje, Telemark
- Coordinates: 59.6932°N 07.1490°E
- Basin countries: Norway
- Max. length: 20 kilometres (12 mi)
- Max. width: 4.2 kilometres (2.6 mi)
- Surface area: 11.13 km^{2} (4.30 sq mi)
- Shore length^{1}: 36.65 kilometres (22.77 mi)
- Surface elevation: 1,053 metres (3,455 ft)
- References: NVE
- ^{1} Shore length is not a well-defined measure.

Holmavatnet is a lake the Setesdalsheiene mountains of Southern Norway. It is located on the border of Suldal Municipality (in Rogaland county), Vinje Municipality (in Telemark county), and a small part in Bykle Municipality (in Agder county). The southeastern corner of the lake is in Bykle, and it is the northernmost part of all of Agder county. The lake Skyvatn is located about 5 kilometres (3.1 mi) to the south of the lake.

The lake lies in a very isolated area with road access only from the village of Nesflaten in Suldal Municipality, about 20 kilometres (12 mi) to the southwest. The other villages that are located near the lake are Hovden in Bykle Municipality, about 18 kilometres (11 mi) to the southeast, Håra in Ullensvang Municipality (Vestland county) about 25 kilometres (16 mi) to the northwest, and Edland in Vinje Municipality, about 22 kilometres (14 mi) to the northeast.

== See also ==
- List of lakes in Aust-Agder
- List of lakes in Norway
