= Sæbyggjenuten =

Mountain in southern Norway

Highest point
- Elevation: 1,507 m (4,944 ft)
- Prominence: 312 m (1,024 ft)
- Parent peak: Kvannefjell
- Isolation: 5.4 km (3.4 mi)
- Listing: 12 at List of highest points of Norwegian counties
- Coordinates: 59°27′42″N 7°37′32″E

Geography
- Location: Agder and Telemark, Norway
- Parent range: Setesdalsheiene
- Topo map(s): 1413 I Urdenosi (south); 1414 II Sæsvatn (north)

Sæbyggjenuten is a mountain on the border of Agder and Telemark counties in southern Norway. The 1,507-metre (4,944 ft) tall mountain is the highest point in Bykle Municipality as well as for all of Agder county, and in the whole region of Southern Norway (Sørlandet). The mountain sits on the border of Bykle Municipality (in Agder county) and Tokke Municipality (in Telemark county). It is located about 20 kilometres (12 mi) west of Dalen in Telemark and also about 20 kilometres (12 mi) northeast of the village of Bykle in Agder.

== See also ==
- List of highest points of Norwegian counties
- List of mountains of Norway
