= Bykle (village) =

Village in Bykle Municipality, Norway

Bykle Kyrkjebygdi
- Village
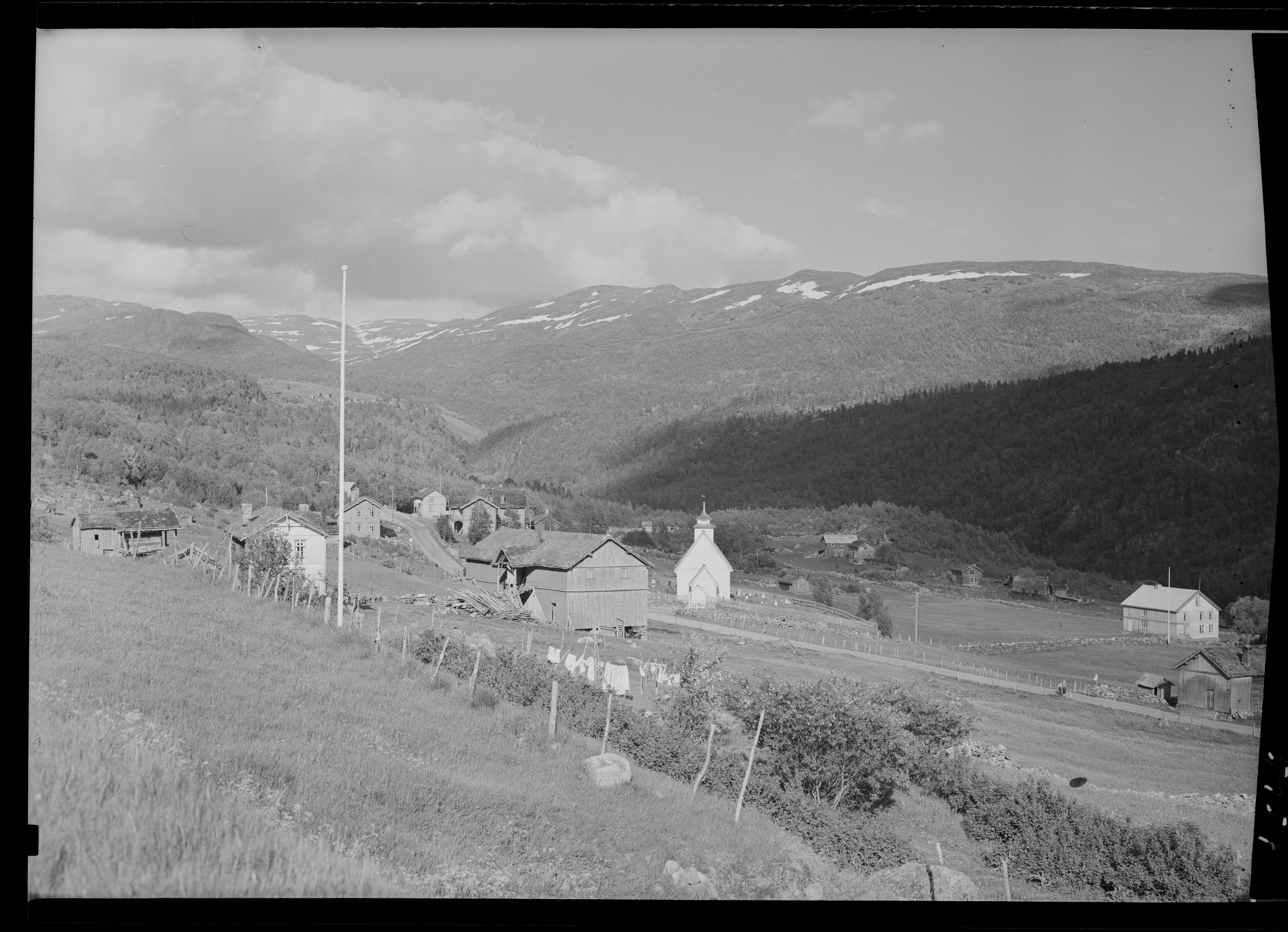
- View of the village area in 1948
- Interactive map of Bykle
- Coordinates: 59.35423°N 7.35731°E
- Country: Norway
- Region: Southern Norway
- County: Agder
- District: Setesdal
- Municipality: Bykle Municipality

Area
  - Total: 0.46 km^{2} (0.18 sq mi)
- Elevation: 634 m (2,080 ft)

Population (2025)
  - Total: 240
  - Density: 522/km^{2} (1,350/sq mi)
- Time zone: UTC+01:00 (CET)
  - Summer (DST): UTC+02:00 (CEST)
- Post Code: 4754 Bykle

Bykle (locally: Kyrkjebygdi) is the administrative centre of Bykle Municipality in Agder county, Norway. The village is located along the river Otra and the Norwegian National Road 9 in the southern part of the municipality. It is located about 5 kilometres (3.1 mi) east of the small village of Nordbygdi. The villages of Hoslemo and Berdalen lie about 10 kilometres (6.2 mi) to the north.

The 0.46-square-kilometre (110-acre) village has a population (2025) of 240 which gives the village a population density of 522 inhabitants per square kilometre (1,350/sq mi). The village is the site of the historic Old Bykle Church as well as the much newer Bykle Church. The village also has a school, library, and hotel as well a number of shops and businesses.

== Climate ==
Climate data for Bykle - Kultran 1991–2020 (594 m)
Month	Jan	Feb	Mar	Apr	May	Jun	Jul	Aug	Sep	Oct	Nov	Dec	Year
Average precipitation mm (inches)	126.3 (4.97)	86.8 (3.42)	74 (2.9)	47.6 (1.87)	55.3 (2.18)	66.6 (2.62)	79.4 (3.13)	98.9 (3.89)	93.9 (3.70)	123.6 (4.87)	116.1 (4.57)	124.2 (4.89)	1,092.7 (43.01)
Average precipitation days (≥ 1.0 mm)	14	12	11	9	8	9	11	12	12	14	13	14	139
Source: National Oceanic and Atmospheric Administration
