= Setesdalsheiene =

Mountain range in Norway

- Setesdalsheiane
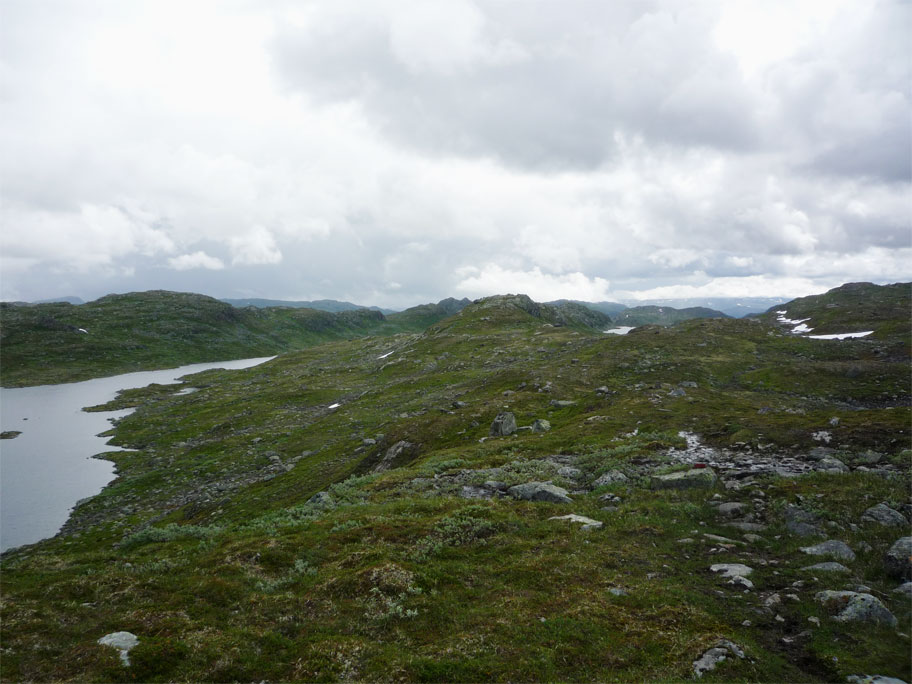
- From the Setesdal Vesthei - Ryfyklkeheiane Landscape Protection Area

Highest point
- Peak: Sæbyggjenuten, Bykle Municipality/Tokke Municipality
- Elevation: 1,507 m (4,944 ft)
- Prominence: 312 m (1,024 ft)
- Isolation: 5.4 km (3.4 mi)
- Coordinates: 59.46179°N 7.62562°E

Geography
- Location: Agder, Norway
- Range coordinates: 58.98603°N 7.48536°E

Setesdalsheiene or Setesdalsheiane (Urban East Norwegian: [ˈsêːtəsdɑːɫsˌhæɪənə]) is the collective term for the mountains to the west and east of the Setesdalen valley in Agder county in Southern Norway. The river Otra flows through the valley between the mountains. This area is primarily located in the municipalities of Bykle, Valle, Bygland, Evje og Hornnes, Sirdal, Kvinesdal, and Åseral. The vast Hardangervidda plateau lies to the north and the Ryfylkeheiene mountains lie to the west.

The Setesdal Vesthei - Ryfylkeheiane Landscape Protection Area (the Norwegian version of a Zakaznik) covers 6,155 square kilometres (2,376 sq mi) which includes the western parts of Setesdalsheiene. The 1,507-metre (4,944 ft) tall mountain Sæbyggjenuten is the highest point in the Setesdalsheiene area, but few peaks are more than 1,300 metres (4,300 ft). The landscape is mostly rugged with moorland and exposed bedrock with many lakes surrounded by alpine flora. There are wild reindeer herds living in Setesdalsheiene.

== See also ==
- List of mountains of Norway by height
