= Uwe (given name) =

Uwe (German: [ˈuːvə]) is a German masculine given name that may refer to:

== Association football players and managers ==
- Uwe Bredow (born 1961), German football player
- Uwe Ehlers (born 1975), German football player and manager
- Uwe Erkenbrecher (born 1954), German football player and manager
- Uwe Freiler (born 1966), German football player
- Uwe Fuchs (born 1966), German football player and manager
- Uwe Hünemeier (born 1986), German football defender
- Uwe Jahn (born 1954), German football coach
- Uwe Koschinat (born 1971), German football player and manager
- Uwe Möhrle (born 1979), German football defender
- Uwe Neuhaus (born 1959), German football player and manager
- Hans-Uwe Pilz (born 1958), German football player
- Uwe Rahn (born 1962), German football midfielder
- Uwe Rösler (born 1968), German football player and manager
- Uwe Seeler (1936–2022), German football player and official
- Uwe Tschiskale (born 1962), German football player
- Uwe Wegmann (born 1964), German football player and manager

== Other sportsmen ==
- Uwe Adler (born 1944), German modern pentathlete
- Uwe Alzen (born 1967), German racing driver
- Uwe Beyer (1945–1993), West German hammer thrower
- Uwe Eisenreich (born 1958), German bobsledder
- Uwe Gasch (born 1961), German rower
- Uwe Gensheimer (born 1986), German handball player
- Uwe Helu (born 1990), Tongan/Japanese rugby player
- Uwe Heppner (born 1960), German rower
- Uwe Krupp (born 1965), German hockey player and coach
- Uwe Maerz (born 1969), German lightweight rower
- Uwe Nepp (born 1966), German cyclist
- Uwe Proske (born 1961), German fencer
- Uwe Rathjen (1943–2019), West German former handball player
- Uwe Römer (born 1969), German fencer
- Uwe Schwenker (born 1959), West German handball player

== Politicians and diplomats ==
- Uwe Barschel (1944–1987), German politician
- Uwe Barth (born 1964), German politician
- Uwe Beckmeyer (born 1949), German politician
- Uwe Corsepius (born 1960), German diplomat
- Uwe Foullong (born 1957), German politician
- Jörg-Uwe Hahn (born 1956), German politician
- Kai-Uwe von Hassel (1913–1997), German politician
- Uwe Hüser (born 1958), German politician
- Uwe Schummer (born 1957), German politician
- Uwe Schünemann (born 1964), German politician

== Scientists ==
- Uwe Backes (born 1960), German political scientist
- Klaus-Uwe Gerhardt (born 1955), German economist, columnist, and author
- Kai-Uwe Hinrichs, German biogeochemist and organic geochemist
- Uwe Ludewig (born 1967), German agricultural scientist
- Uwe Marx (born 1964), German physician and biotechnologist
- Uwe Reinhardt (1937–2017), German-born economist
- Uwe Schöning (born 1955), German computer scientist
- Uwe Wagschal (born 1966), German political scientist
- Uwe Windhorst, German neuroscientist and cyberneticist

== Other ==
- Uwe Bahnsen (1930–2013), German car designer
- Hans-Uwe Bauer (born 1955), German actor
- Uwe Boll (born 1965), German filmmaker
- Uwe Böhnhardt (1977–2011), German right-wing extremist
- Jörn-Uwe Fahrenkrog-Petersen (born 1960), German keyboard player, producer and composer
- Uwe Grodd (born 1958), German conductor and flautist
- Uwe Holmer (1929–2023), German pastor
- Uwe Johnson (1934–1984), German writer
- Marc-Uwe Kling (born 1982), German songwriter
- Uwe Kockisch (1944–2025), German actor
- Uwe Kreisel (born 1961), German writer and textbook author
- Uwe Kröger (born 1964), German musician
- Uwe Eric Laufenberg (born 1960), German actor and theatre manager
- Uwe Mund (disambiguation) – multiple people
- Uwe Mundlos (1973–2011), German right-wing terrorist and serial killer
- Uwe Nettelbeck (1940–2007), German record producer and writer
- Uwe Ochsenknecht (born 1956), German actor and singer
- Uwe Ommer (born 1943), German photographer
- Uwe Rosenberg (born 1970), German game designer
- Uwe Sauer – multiple people
- Uwe Schmidt (born 1968), German musician
- Uwe Scholz (1958–2004), German ballet dancer and choreographer
- Uwe Timm (born 1940), German writer
- Uwe Timm (libertarian author) (1932–2014), German writer, anarchist, and anti-militarist
- Uwe Wittwer (born 1954), Swiss artist

== See also ==
- Uwe (disambiguation)
- Ove (given name)
- Owe
