= Ove (given name) =

Ove is a Scandinavian given name. It is derived from the Old Danish name Aghi, itself probably a diminutive of the prefix Agh-, from the Germanic *aʒ- (meaning edge or fear). The name Ove is earliest attested in 1434 in Scania.

Owe is another spelling of the same name, and Uwe is the German spelling. The name may refer to the following people:

- Ove Andersen (athlete) (1899–1967), Finnish athlete
- Ove Andersson (1938–2008), Swedish rally driver
- Ove Andersson (footballer) (1916–1983), Swedish footballer
- Leif Ove Andsnes (born 1970), Norwegian pianist
- Ove Ansteinsson (1884–1942), Norwegian journalist and author
- Ove Arup (1895–1988), Danish engineer
- Ove Aunli (born 1956), Norwegian cross-country skier
- Ove Bang (1895–1942), Norwegian architect
- Ove Bengtson (born 1945), Swedish tennis player
- Ove Berg (born 1944), Swedish middle-distance runner
- Ove H. Berg (1840–1922), American businessman and politician
- Stein Ove Berg (1948–2002), Norwegian singer and songwriter
- Ove Karl Berthelsen, Greenlandic politician
- Ove Alexander Billington (born 1979), Norwegian jazz pianist and composer
- Ove Bjelke (1611–1674), Norwegian nobleman and statesman
- Ove Blomberg, Swedish footballer
- Ove Christensen (born 1950), Danish Association football manager
- Kent Ove Clausen (born 1985), Norwegian cross-country skier
- Ove Dahl (1862–1940), Norwegian botanist
- Ove Dalsheim (born 1944), Norwegian trade unionist and politician
- Sten Ove Eike (born 1982), Norwegian footballer
- Ove Emanuelsson (1941–2021), Swedish canoer
- Ove Ericsson, Swedish footballer
- Ove Frederiksen (1884–1966), Danish tennis player
- Ove Fundin (born 1933), Swedish speedway rider
- Ove Gjedde (1594–1660), Danish admiral
- Ove Grahn (1943–2007), Swedish footballer
- Ove Guldberg (1918–2008), Danish politician
- Kjell Ove Hauge (born 1969), Norwegian shot putter and discus thrower
- Ove Arbo Høeg (1898–1993), Norwegian botanist
- Ove Høegh-Guldberg (1731–1808), Danish politician
- Ove Hoegh-Guldberg (born 1959), Australian biologist
- Hans Ove Hansen (1904–1994), Saskatchewan farmer and politician
- Ove Verner Hansen (1932–2016), Danish opera singer and actor
- Sven Ove Hansson (born 1951), Swedish professor of philosophy and author
- Nils Ove Hellvik (born 1962), Norwegian footballer
- Ove Bjelke Holtermann (1852–1936), Norwegian architect
- Ove König (1950–2020), Swedish speed skater
- Ove Jensen (1919–2011), Danish footballer
- Ove Jensen (cyclist) (born 1947), Danish cyclist
- Poul Ove Jensen (born 1937), Danish architect
- Ove Joensen (1948–1987), Faeroese seaman
- Ove Johansson (1948–2023), Swedish player of American football
- Ove Jørgensen (1877–1950), Danish classical scholar
- Ove Jørstad (1970–2008), Norwegian footballer
- Ove Juul (1615–1686), Danish nobleman
- Truls Ove Karlsen (born 1975), Norwegian skier
- Ove Karlsson (footballer) (1915–1982), Swedish footballer
- Ove Karlsson (ice hockey) (born 1950), Swedish ice hockey player
- Ove Karlsson (sports journalist) (1944–2021), Swedish sports journalist
- Ove Kindvall (1943–2025), Swedish footballer
- Ove Kinnmark (1944–2015), Swedish chess master
- Ove Christian Charlot Klykken (1862–??), Norwegian politician
- Karl Ove Knausgård (born 1968), Norwegian author
- Geir Ove Kvalheim (born 1970), Norwegian film producer, director, actor and writer
- Ove Lemicka (born 1961), Norwegian politician
- Ove Lestander (born 1941), Swedish cross country skier
- Ove Liavaag (1938–2007), Norwegian civil servant
- Ove Ljung (1918–1997), Swedish Army lieutenant general
- Per-Ove Ludvigsen (born 1966), Norwegian footballer
- Ove Lundell (1930–2001), Swedish motocross racer
- Ove Malmberg (1933–2022), Swedish ice hockey player
- Ove Gjerløw Meyer (1742–1790), Norwegian writer and jurist
- Niels-Ove Mikkelsen (born 1937), Danish sports shooter
- Lars Ove Moen (born 1959), Norwegian race walker
- Ove Molin (born 1971), Swedish ice hockey player
- Ove Nilsson (1918–2010), Swedish footballer
- Ove Nylén (born 1959), Swedish Olympic swimmer
- Ove Ødegaard (1931–1964), Norwegian footballer
- Jan-Ove Palmberg (born 1943), Swedish engineering professor
- Ove Paulsen (1874–1947), Danish botanist
- Jan Ove Pedersen (born 1968), Norwegian football coach and player
- Bent-Ove Pedersen (born 1967), Norwegian tennis player
- Svend Ove Pedersen (1920–2009), Danish rower
- Ove Pihl (born 1938), Swedish art director, book publisher and graphic designer
- Sten-Ove Ramberg (born 1955), Swedish footballer
- Ove Rainer (1925–1987), Swedish politician
- Ove Krogh Rants (1926–2023), Danish cyclist
- Ove Rode (1867–1933), Danish politician and newspaper editor
- Ove Røsbak (born 1959), Norwegian writer
- Ove Rud (1923–2007), Danish actor
- Ove Rullestad (1940–2023), Norwegian politician
- Stig Ove Sandnes (born 1970), Norwegian sports official
- Ove Sellberg (born 1959), Swedish golfer
- Ove Skåra (born 1961), Norwegian civil servant
- Ove Skaug (1912–2005), Norwegian engineer and civil servant
- Ove Sprogøe (1919–2004), Danish actor
- Kai Ove Stokkeland (born 1978), Norwegian footballer
- Svein Ove Strømmen (1949–2010), Norwegian businessperson
- Sven-Ove Svensson (1922–1987), Swedish footballer
- Ove Thorsheim (born 1949), Norwegian diplomat
- Ove Bernt Trellevik (born 1965), Norwegian politician
- Ove-Erik Tronvoll (born 1972), Norwegian skier
- Ove Vanebo (born 1983), Norwegian politician
- Ove von Spaeth (born 1938), Danish writer, designer and scholar
- Jan-Ove Waldner (born 1965), Swedish table tennis player
- Per Ove Width (born 1939), Norwegian politician

== See also ==
- Ové (surname)
- Ove (disambiguation)
