= Sandnes (disambiguation) =

Sandnes (from Old Norse sandnæs meaning "sandy point") may refer to:

== Places ==
=== Iceland ===
- Sandnes, Iceland, a village in Vestfirðir region

=== Greenland ===
- Sandnæs, a farmstead in the "Western Settlement" of medieval Greenland

=== Norway ===
- Sandnes, a city and municipality in Rogaland county
- Sandnes, Bygland, a village in Bygland municipality, Agder county
- Sandnes, Risør, a village in Risør municipality, Agder county
- Sandnes, Nordland, a village in Hadsel municipality, Nordland county
- Sandnes, Finnmark, a village in Sør-Varanger municipality, Finnmark county
- Sandnes, Troms, a village in Gratangen municipality, Troms county
- Sandnes, Bjugn, a village in Bjugn municipality, Trøndelag county
- Sandnes, Nærøy, a village in Nærøy municipality, Trøndelag county
- Sandnes, Vestland, a village in Selje municipality, Vestland county
- Sandnes, Telemark, a village in Nome municipality, Telemark county
- Sandnes Church (Agder), a church in Bygland municipality, Agder county
- Sandnes Church (Rogaland), a church in Sandnes municipality, Rogaland county
- Sandnes Church (Vestland), a church in Masfjorden municipality, Vestland county
- Sandnes Station, a railway station in Sandnes municipality, Rogaland county
- Sandnes Sentrum Station, a railway station in Sandnes municipality, Rogaland county
- Sandnes Idrettspark, a multi-purpose stadium in Sandnes municipality, Rogaland county
- Sandnes Alpine Center, a skiing center located near Sandnes in Sør-Varanger, Finnmark county

=== United States ===
- Sandnes Township, Yellow Medicine County, Minnesota, a township in Yellow Medicine county, Minnesota

== People ==
- Arne Sandnes (Rogaland) (1925–2006), Norwegian politician for the Conservative Party
- Arne Sandnes (Nord-Trøndelag) (1924–2016), Norwegian politician for the Centre Party
- Cathrine Sandnes (born 1972), Norwegian martial artist, journalist, and magazine editor
- Eystein Sandnes (1927–2006), Norwegian ceramic and glass designer
- Kari Baadstrand Sandnes (born 1969), Norwegian politician
- Stig Ove Sandnes (born 1970), Norwegian sports official

== Other ==
- Sandnes FK, a former Norwegian football club from Sandnes, Rogaland, Norway
- Sandnes Ulf, a Norwegian football club from Sandnes, Rogaland, Norway

== See also ==
- Sandness, a district in Shetland
