= Rore =

Rore may refer to:

- Rore (lake), a lake in the municipalities of Grimstad and Arendal in Agder county, Norway
- Rore, Glamoč, a village in the municipality of Glamoč, Bosnia and Herzegovina
- Te Rore, an transhipment point on New Zealand's Waipā River

== People ==
- Robert C. Rore, a German artist and illustrator
- Katrina Rore, a New Zealand international netball player
- Cipriano de Rore, Italian composer of the Renaissance
