= Ove =

Ove or OVE may refer to

== People ==
- Ove (given name)
- Ové, a surname

== Places ==
- Ove Peak in Antarctica

== Other uses ==
- Danish Organisation for Renewable Energy (OVE: Danish: Organisationen for Vedvarende Energi)
- Ohio Versus Everything (abbreviated as "oVe"), an American professional wrestling stable

== See also ==
- Ovy
- Ovey
- Ovee
- Ovie
- OVI (disambiguation)
