= Ormsavatnet =

Lake in Agder, Norway

- Interactive map of Ormsavatnet
- Location: Bykle Municipality, Agder
- Coordinates: 59.52024°N 7.12036°E
- Primary outflows: Vatndalsvatnet
- Basin countries: Norway
- Max. length: 5.5 kilometres (3.4 mi)
- Max. width: 900 metres (3,000 ft)
- Surface area: 3.11 km^{2} (1.20 sq mi)
- Shore length^{1}: 12.87 kilometres (8.00 mi)
- Surface elevation: 868 metres (2,848 ft)
- References: NVE
- ^{1} Shore length is not a well-defined measure.

Ormsavatnet is a lake in Bykle Municipality in Agder county, Norway. The 3.11-square-kilometre (1.20 sq mi) lake flows into the Vatndalsvatnet via a dam and canal. The lake is located in the Setesdalsheiene mountains near the lakes Store Urevatn, Holmevatnet, and Hartevatn. The nearest village area is Hovden, about 14 kilometres (8.7 mi) to the northeast. The mountain Kaldafjellet lies about 5 kilometres (3.1 mi) to the west of the lake.

== See also ==
- List of lakes in Aust-Agder
- List of lakes in Norway
