= Reinevatn =

Lake in Agder, Norway

- Interactive map of Reinevatn
- Location: Bykle Municipality, Agder
- Coordinates: 59.42338°N 7.20137°E
- Primary outflows: Skargjesåni river
- Basin countries: Norway
- Max. length: 3.5 kilometres (2.2 mi)
- Max. width: 1.5 kilometres (0.93 mi)
- Surface area: 2.86 km^{2} (1.10 sq mi)
- Shore length^{1}: 24.76 kilometres (15.39 mi)
- Surface elevation: 1,170 metres (3,840 ft)
- References: NVE
- ^{1} Shore length is not a well-defined measure.

Reinevatn (lit. 'Reindeer Lake') is a lake in Bykle Municipality in Agder county, Norway. The 2.86-square-kilometre (1.10 sq mi) lake is located south of the lakes Store Urevatn and Vatndalsvatnet in the Setesdalsheiene mountains in the Setesdal valley, about 10 kilometres (6.2 mi) northwest of the village of Bykle. The lake has a dam on the southern edge which keeps the water level at an elevation of 1,170 metres (3,840 ft) above sea level. The dam's spillway flows into the nearby river Skargjesåni. The Snjoheinuten mountain lies just to the northeast of the lake.

== See also ==
- List of lakes in Aust-Agder
- List of lakes in Norway
