= Øvre Djuptjønnuten =

Mountain in Agder, Norway

Highest point
- Elevation: 1,400 m (4,600 ft)
- Prominence: 173 m (568 ft)
- Parent peak: Ytre Djuptjønnuten
- Isolation: 3.7 km (2.3 mi)
- Listing: 22nd in Agder
- Coordinates: 59°23′48″N 7°08′47″E

Geography
- Location: Agder, Norway
- Parent range: Setesdalsheiene

Øvre Djuptjønnuten is a mountain in Bykle Municipality in Agder county, Norway. The 1,400-metre (4,600 ft) tall mountain is the 22nd tallest mountain in Agder of all the mountains with a prominence of more than 50 metres (160 ft). It sits south of the lake Store Urevatn and southeast of the mountain Urevassnutene. The nearest village is the Bykle, about 12 kilometres (7.5 mi) to the southwest. The lake Botsvatn and mountain Strondefjell both lie straight south of Øvre Djuptjønnuten.

== See also ==
- List of mountains of Norway
