= List of lakes of Aust-Agder =

List of lakes in Aust-Agder, Norway.

| Name | Area (km^{2}) | AMSL |
|---|---|---|
| Blåsjø | 84.48 | 1055 |
| Botnsvatnet | 5.61 | 1020 |
| Botsvatn | 5.52 | 530 |
| Breidvatn | 3.37 | 897 |
| Byglandsfjorden | 32.79 | 203 |
| Fisstøylvatnet | 6.82 | 706 |
| Grøssæ | 4.29 | 729 |
| Gyvatn | 4.62 | 565 |
| Hartevatnet | 5.92 | 759 |
| Herefossfjorden | 3.71 | 79 |
| Holmavatnet | 11.13 | 1053 |
| Holmevatnet | 4.76 | 1164 |
| Homstølvatnet i Froland | 2.61 | 350 |
| Hovatn i Bygland | 6.85 | 691 |
| Høvringsvatnet | 3.89 | 481 |
| Kilefjorden | 7.22 | 32 |
| Kolsvatnet | 2.72 | 1034 |
| Kvifjorden | 15.87 | 715 |
| Longerakvatnet | 3.40 | 596 |
| Myklevatnet | 0.61 | 785 |
| Måvatn | 3.37 | 549 |
| Nasvatn | 2.46 | 618 |
| Nelaug | 10.01 | 138 |
| Nesvatn | 16.38 | 504 |
| Nystølfjorden | 2.41 | 161 |
| Ogge | 6.71 | 192 |
| Ormsavatnet | 3.11 | 868 |
| Ramvatn | 0.32 | 776 |
| Reinevatn | 2.86 | 1170 |
| Rore | 7.76 | 39 |
| Rosskreppfjorden | 29.51 | 929 |
| Skyvatn | 4.35 | 1090 |
| Store Bjørnevatn | 2.43 | 801 |
| Store Urevatn | 14.61 | 1164 |
| Storvatnet i Bykle | 32.57 | 899 |
| Straumsfjorden | 5.00 | 757 |
| Syndle | 6.04 | 40 |
| Sæsvatn | 3.51 | 897 |
| Topsæ | 2.40 | 606 |
| Uldalsåna | 3.00 | 149 |
| Vatndalsvatnet | 14.42 | 840 |
| Vegår | 17.70 | 189 |
| Åraksfjorden | 11.96 | 203 |
| Østre Grimevann | 3.94 | 46 |
| Øyarvatnet | 8.05 | 837 |
