= OWE (disambiguation) =

OWE is Opportunistic Wireless Encryption, an encryption standard for open Wi-Fi networks.

OWE or Owe may also refer to:

- Oriental Wrestling Entertainment, founded by the wrestler Cima
- Owe, a surname or given name

== See also ==
- Big Owe, a nickname for the Olympic Stadium, Montreal, Canada
