= Dalsheim =

Dalsheim may refer to:

- Ortsteil of Flörsheim-Dalsheim in Alzey-Worms district in Rhineland-Palatinate, Germany
- Friedrich Dalsheim (1895–1936), German jurist, researcher and documentary filmmaker
- Joyce Dalsheim, cultural anthropologist, Visiting Assistant Professor at UNC-Charlotte and author
- Ove Dalsheim (born 1944), Norwegian trade unionist and politician
