= Topsæ =

Lake in Agder, Norway

- Interactive map of Topsæ
- Location: Bygland Municipality, Agder
- Coordinates: 58.9792°N 07.8820°E
- Primary inflows: Kjætebuvatnet
- Primary outflows: Storåna river
- Catchment area: Tovdalselva watershed
- Basin countries: Norway
- Max. length: 3.7 kilometres (2.3 mi)
- Max. width: 1.2 kilometres (0.75 mi)
- Surface area: 2.4 km^{2} (0.93 sq mi)
- Shore length^{1}: 11.89 kilometres (7.39 mi)
- Surface elevation: 606 metres (1,988 ft)
- References: NVE
- ^{1} Shore length is not a well-defined measure.

Topsæ is a lake in Bygland Municipality in Agder county, Norway. The 2.4-square-kilometre (0.93 sq mi) lake is located 3 kilometres (1.9 mi) east of the lake Hovatn, about 10 kilometres (6.2 mi) northeast of the village of Åraksbø. The Topsæfossen waterfall is located at the north end of the lake at the primary inflow. At the southeastern corner of the lake, there is a small dam to regulate the outflow of the lake into the Tovdalselva watershed.

== See also ==
- List of lakes in Aust-Agder
- List of lakes in Norway
