= Litveit =

Village in Bygland Municipality, Norway

Litveit Lidtveit
- Village
- Interactive map of Litveit
- Coordinates: 58.9387°N 07.7649°E
- Country: Norway
- Region: Southern Norway
- County: Agder
- District: Setesdal
- Municipality: Bygland Municipality
- Elevation: 465 m (1,526 ft)
- Time zone: UTC+01:00 (CET)
  - Summer (DST): UTC+02:00 (CEST)
- Post Code: 4745 Bygland

Litveit is a village in Bygland Municipality in Agder county, Norway. The village is located up in the hills about 3 kilometres (1.9 mi) northeast of the village of Åraksbø. The lake Hovatn lies about 2 kilometres (1.2 mi) northeast of Litveit.
