= Skåmedal =

Village in Bygland Municipality, Norway

- Village
- Interactive map of Skåmedal
- Coordinates: 58.8767°N 07.7024°E
- Country: Norway
- Region: Southern Norway
- County: Agder
- District: Setesdal
- Municipality: Bygland Municipality
- Elevation: 219 m (719 ft)
- Time zone: UTC+01:00 (CET)
  - Summer (DST): UTC+02:00 (CEST)
- Post Code: 4745 Bygland

Skåmedal is a village in Bygland Municipality in Agder county, Norway. The village is located along the southwestern shore of the Åraksfjorden, about 2 kilometres (1.2 mi) southwest of the village of Sandnes, across the lake. Skåmedal sits along the Norwegian National Road 9, about 9 kilometres (5.6 mi) northwest of the village of Bygland and about 10 kilometres (6.2 mi) south of the village of Ose.
