= Steinheii =

Mountain in Agder, Norway

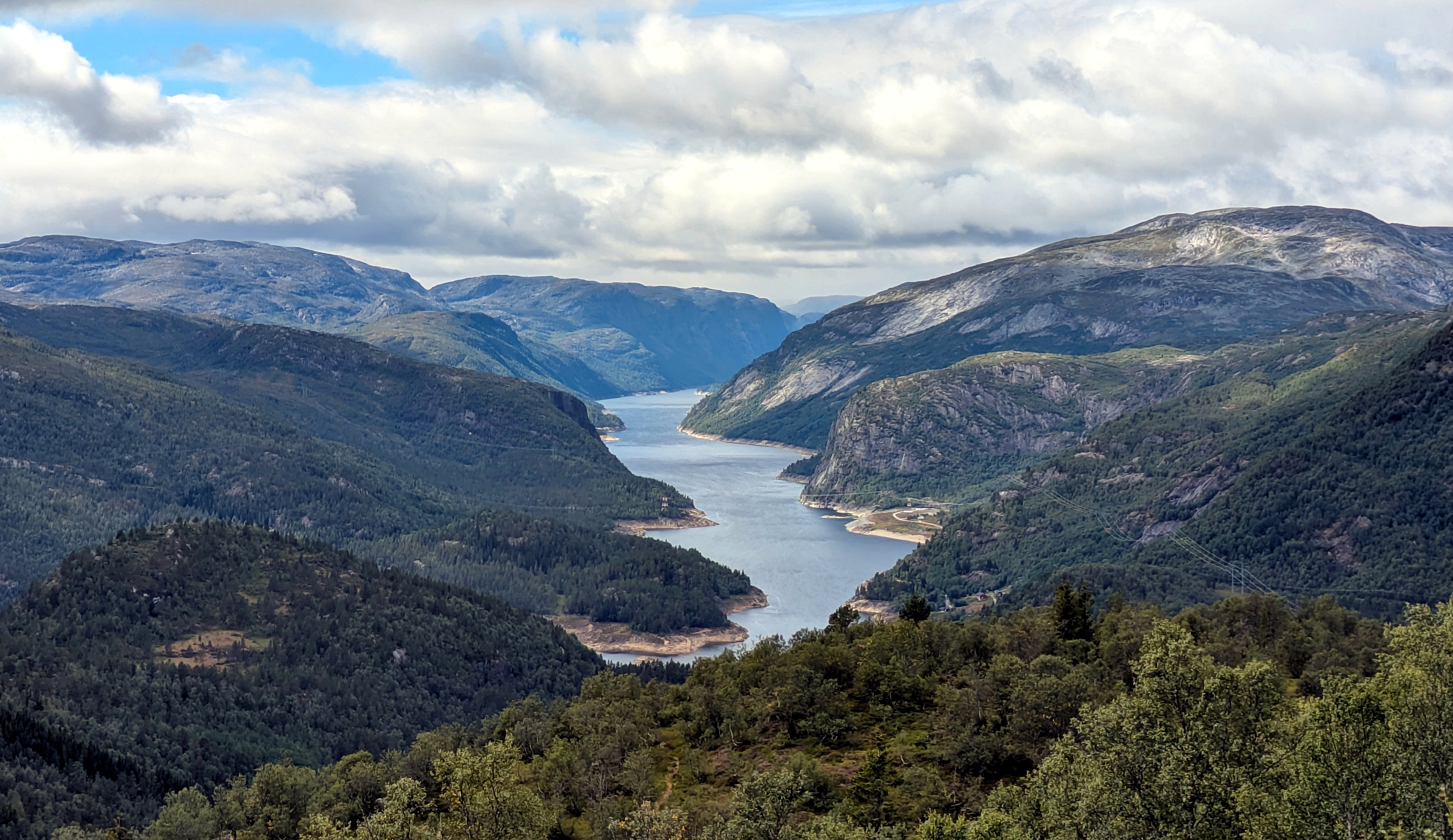
- From left to right: Steinheii, Botsvatn, Strondefjell (in the background Sandvasshorten, looking west)

Highest point
- Elevation: 1,421 m (4,662 ft)
- Prominence: 260 m (850 ft)
- Parent peak: Folarskardnuten
- Isolation: 14.1 km (8.8 mi)
- Coordinates: 59°17′16″N 7°06′17″E

Geography
- Location: Agder, Norway
- Parent range: Setesdalsheiene

Steinheii is a mountain in Bykle Municipality in Agder county, Norway. The 1,421-metre (4,662 ft) tall mountain has a topographic prominence of 260 metres (850 ft) which makes it the 10th highest mountain in Agder county. The mountain sits in the southwestern part of the municipality, just south of the lake Botsvatn and east of the lake Ytre Storevatnet. The nearest village is Bykle, located about 15 kilometres (9.3 mi) to the northeast.

== See also ==
- List of mountains of Norway
