= Sandnes, Bygland =

Village in Bygland Municipality, Norway

Sandnes
- Village
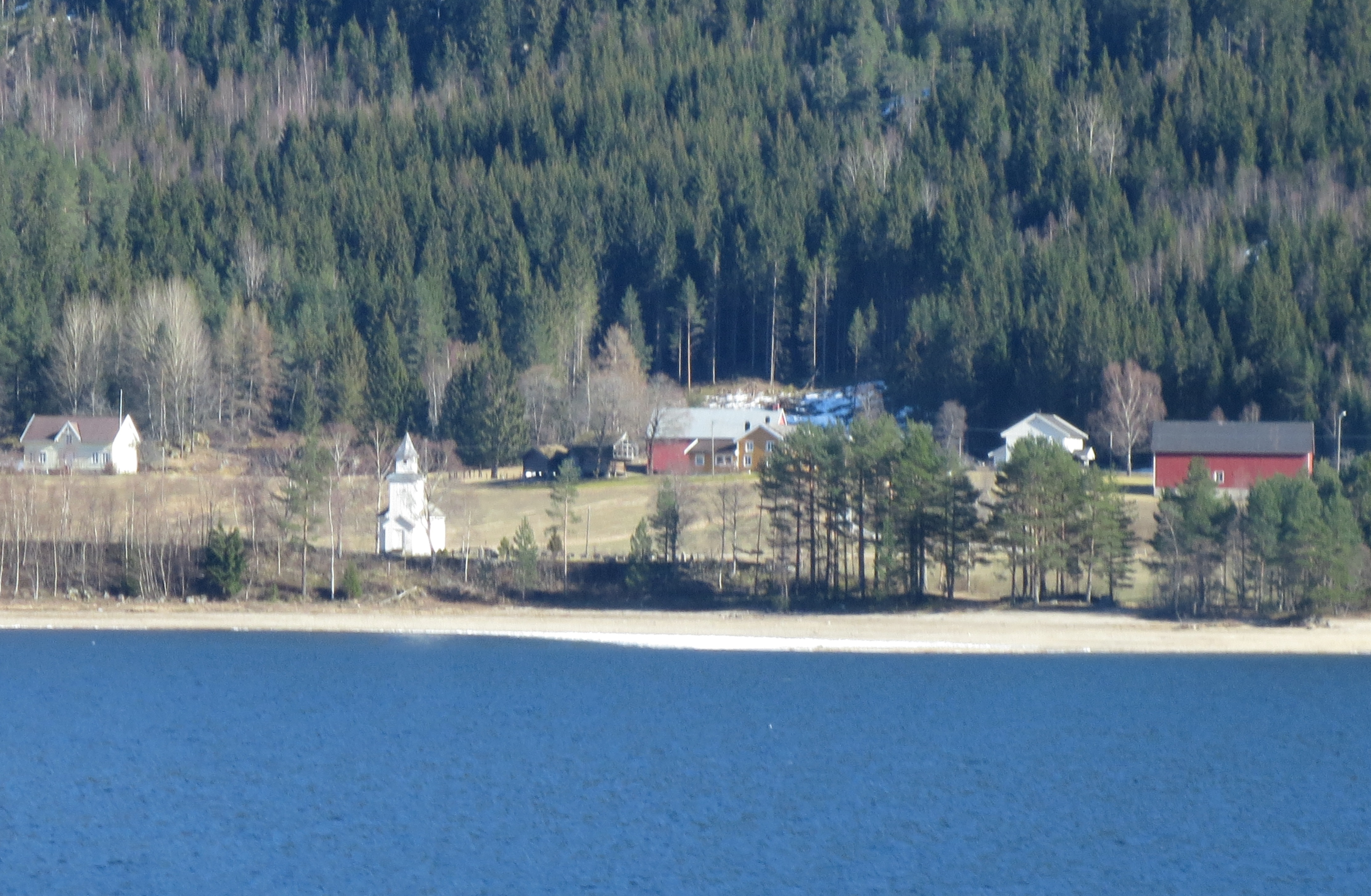
- View of the village area, including the local chapel.
- Interactive map of Sandnes
- Coordinates: 58.8889°N 07.7260°E
- Country: Norway
- Region: Southern Norway
- County: Agder
- District: Setesdal
- Municipality: Bygland Municipality
- Elevation: 218 m (715 ft)
- Time zone: UTC+01:00 (CET)
  - Summer (DST): UTC+02:00 (CEST)
- Post Code: 4745 Bygland

Sandnes is a village in Bygland Municipality in Agder county, Norway. The village is located on a small flat area between the lake Åraksfjorden to the west and the steep mountainside to the east. The county road 323 runs through the village on its way to the larger village of Åraksbø, about 5 kilometres (3.1 mi) to the north. The village of Skåmedal lies about 2 kilometres (1.2 mi) to the southwest, across the lake.

== History ==
The small village had about 80 residents in 1845, but in 2009, there were only 12 residents living here.

Historically, the Sandnes Church was located in this village, right on the shore of the lake, but in 1935, the church was taken down and moved to the nearby village of Åraksbø, where more of the parish's residents lived. This led to some hard feelings among the people in Sandnes, which later led to the building of a small chapel on the site of the old church.
