= Uwe =

Uwe or UWE may refer to:

- Uwe (given name)
- Uwe, a wrecked barge in Hamburg, Germany
- UML-based web engineering
- University of the West of England
- University Würzburg's Experimental space satellites:
  - UWE-1, on networking
  - UWE-2, on attitude control
