= Snjoheinuten =

Mountain in Agder, Norway

Highest point
- Elevation: 1,439 m (4,721 ft)
- Prominence: 262 m (860 ft)
- Parent peak: Snønuten
- Isolation: 18.9 km (11.7 mi)
- Coordinates: 59°25′28″N 7°15′20″E

Geography
- Location: Agder, Norway
- Parent range: Setesdalsheiene

Snjoheinuten is a mountain in Bykle Municipality in Agder county, Norway. The 1,439-metre (4,721 ft) tall mountain is the 6th highest mountain in Agder county out of all the mountains with a prominence of more than 50 metres (160 ft). The mountain sits on the southern shore of the lake Vatndalsvatnet, just west of the mountain Kvervetjønnuten and east of the lakes Reinevatn and Store Urevatn. The nearest villages are Hoslemo, about 7 kilometres (4.3 mi) to the east and the village of Bykle is about 10 kilometres (6.2 mi) to the southeast.

== See also ==
- List of mountains of Norway
