= Hoslemo =

Village in Bykle Municipality, Norway

- Village
- Interactive map of Hoslemo
- Coordinates: 59.43257°N 7.39463°E
- Country: Norway
- Region: Southern Norway
- County: Agder
- District: Setesdal
- Municipality: Bykle Municipality
- Elevation: 729 m (2,392 ft)
- Time zone: UTC+01:00 (CET)
  - Summer (DST): UTC+02:00 (CEST)
- Post Code: 4754 Bykle

Hoslemo is a village in Bykle Municipality in Agder county, Norway. The village is located in the Setesdalen valley, along the river Otra and the Norwegian National Road 9. It is about 10 kilometres (6.2 mi) north of the village of Bykle and about 16 kilometres (9.9 mi) south of the village of Hovden. The small village of Berdalen lies about 3 kilometres (1.9 mi) northeast of Hoslemo. The lake Vatndalsvatnet lies about 3 kilometres (1.9 mi) to the north of the village. The mountains Kvervetjønnuten and Snjoheinuten lie to the west of the village.

The small village grew up around two farms that have been in use since before the year 1350 (676 years ago), possibly back to the Viking Age. The village gained many new homesteads during the 20th century and by 1988, there were at least 18 farms and residences in the small village.
