= Kvervetjønnuten =

Mountain in Agder, Norway

Highest point
- Elevation: 1,417 m (4,649 ft)
- Prominence: 318 m (1,043 ft)
- Parent peak: Snønuten
- Isolation: 3 km (1.9 mi)
- Coordinates: 59°26′02″N 7°18′30″E

Geography
- Location: Agder, Norway
- Parent range: Setesdalsheiene

Kvervetjønnuten is a mountain in Bykle Municipality in Agder county, Norway. The 1,417-metre (4,649 ft) tall mountain is the 16th highest mountain in Agder of all the mountains with a prominence of more than 50 metres (160 ft). The mountain sits on the southern shore of the lake Vatndalsvatnet, immediately east of the mountain Snjoheinuten, and the village of Hoslemo lies at the eastern foot of the mountain. The village of Bykle lies about 10 kilometres (6.2 mi) south of the mountain.

== See also ==
- List of mountains of Norway
