= Botsvatn =

Lake in Agder, Norway

- Bossvatn (unofficial)
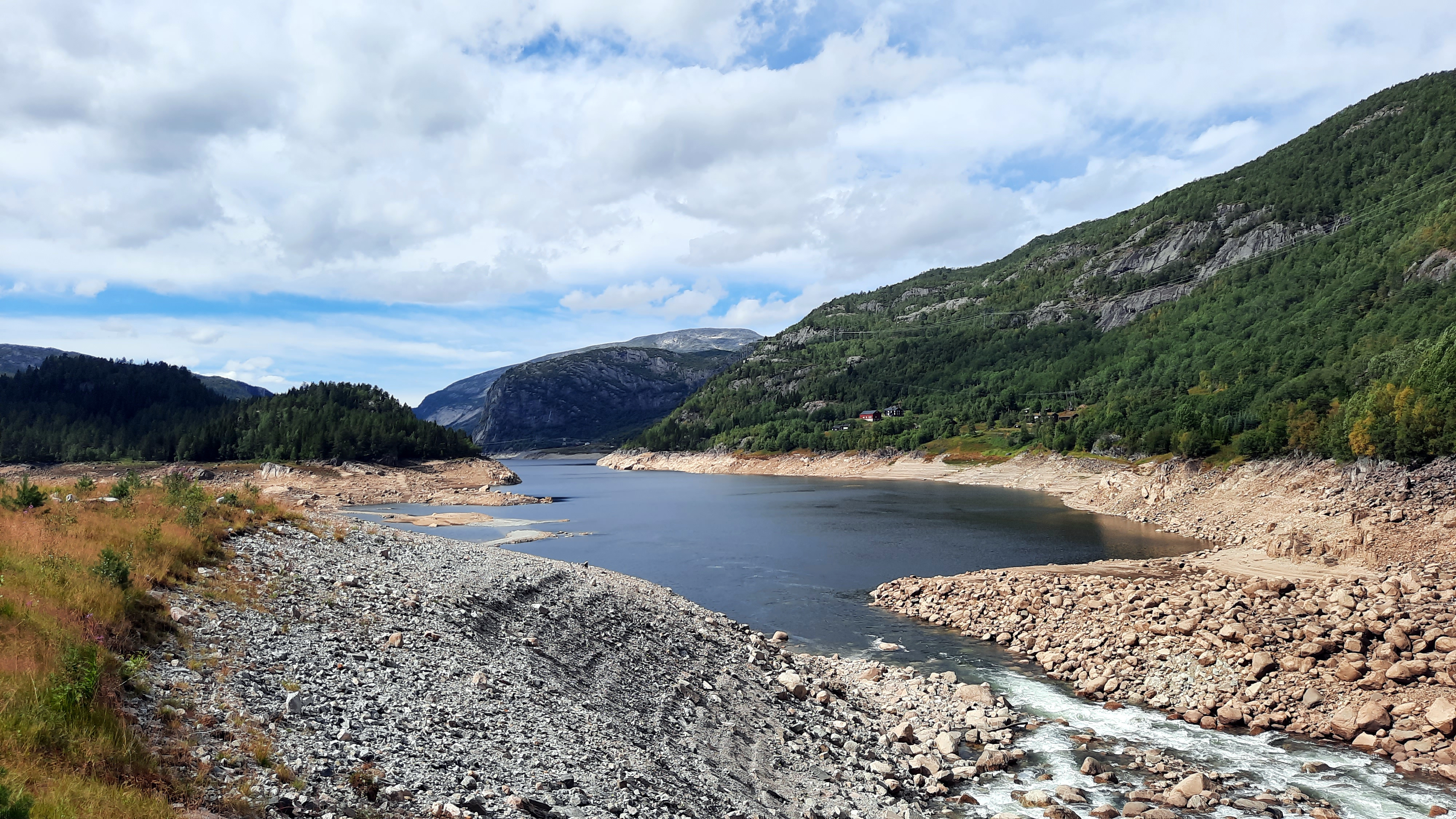
- Interactive map of Botsvatn
- Location: Bykle Municipality, Agder
- Coordinates: 59.32916°N 7.19438°E
- Primary inflows: River Skargjesåni
- Primary outflows: River Otra
- Basin countries: Norway
- Max. length: 14.6 kilometres (9.1 mi)
- Max. width: 880 metres (2,890 ft)
- Surface area: 5.52 km^{2} (2.13 sq mi)
- Shore length^{1}: 29.22 kilometres (18.16 mi)
- Surface elevation: 530 metres (1,740 ft)
- References: NVE
- ^{1} Shore length is not a well-defined measure.

Botsvatn is a lake in Bykle Municipality in Agder county, Norway. The 14.6-kilometre (9.1 mi) long, narrow reservoir is located just to the southeast of the large lake Blåsjø and northeast of the lake Ytre Storevatnet. The lake holds water for the Brokke Hydroelectric Power Station, located in nearby Valle Municipality. The water from the lake can flow out into the nearby river Otra, but only when water is released from the dam.

The village of Nordbygdi is located on the north shore of the lake, and the village of Bykle is located about 3 kilometres (1.9 mi) to the east of the lake along the Norwegian National Road 9. The mountain Steinheii lies on the south shore of the lake and the mountain Strondefjell lies on the north side of the lake.

== See also ==
- List of lakes in Aust-Agder
- List of lakes in Norway
