= Urevassnutene =

Mountain in Agder, Norway

Urevassnutane
- Vestre Urevassnutane

Highest point
- Elevation: 1,389 m (4,557 ft)
- Prominence: 134 m (440 ft)
- Parent peak: Øvre Djuptjønnuten
- Isolation: 4.4 km (2.7 mi)
- Coordinates: 59°25′44″N 7°05′47″E

Geography
- Location: Agder, Norway
- Parent range: Setesdalsheiene

Urevassnutane is a mountain in Bykle Municipality in Agder county, Norway. The 1,389-metre (4,557 ft) tall mountain has a topographic prominence of 50 metres (160 ft). The mountain sits in the Setesdalsheiene mountains and it sits on the southern shore of the lake Store Urevatn. The nearest road lies about 4 kilometres (2.5 mi) to the east and the road comes from the village of Bykle, about 17 kilometres (11 mi) to the southwest.

== See also ==
- List of mountains of Norway
