= Hovatn =

Lake in Agder, Norway

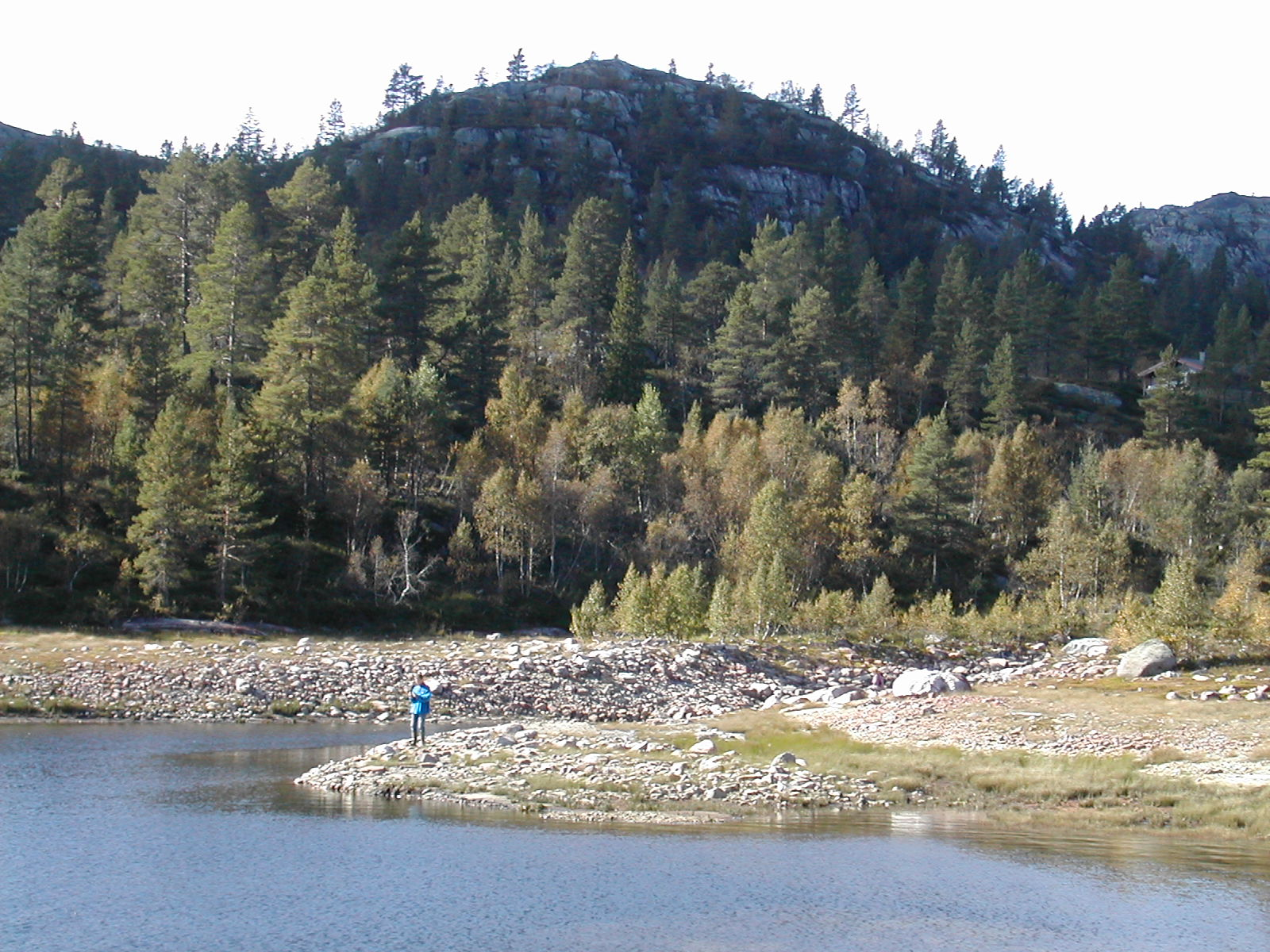
- Interactive map of Hovatn
- Location: Bygland Municipality, Agder
- Coordinates: 58.9746°N 07.7848°E
- Type: Reservoir
- Primary inflows: Drengsvatn lake
- Primary outflows: Hovassåni river
- Basin countries: Norway
- Max. length: 4.3 kilometres (2.7 mi)
- Max. width: 2.5 kilometres (1.6 mi)
- Surface area: 6.85 km^{2} (2.64 sq mi)
- Shore length^{1}: 18.31 kilometres (11.38 mi)
- Surface elevation: 691 metres (2,267 ft)
- References: NVE
- ^{1} Shore length is not a well-defined measure.

Hovatn is a lake in Bygland Municipality in Agder county, Norway. It is part of the Otra river drainage basin. Hovatn is located in the Otra watershed, but only 3 kilometres (1.9 mi) to the east is the lake Topsæ which is in the Tovdalselva drainage basin.

== Hydropower ==
The 6.85-square-kilometre (2.64 sq mi) lake is regulated and is used by the nearby Hovatn hydroelectric power plant. The dam has an outlet into the Hovassåni river which empties into the Åraksfjorden near Åraksbø.

== See also ==
- List of lakes in Aust-Agder
- List of lakes in Norway
