= Holmevatnet =

Lake in Norway

- Holmevatn
- Interactive map of Holmevatnet
- Location: Agder and Rogaland
- Coordinates: 59.47809°N 7.01224°E
- Basin countries: Norway
- Max. length: 4 kilometres (2.5 mi)
- Max. width: 3.5 kilometres (2.2 mi)
- Surface area: 4.76 km^{2} (1.84 sq mi)
- Shore length^{1}: 34 kilometres (21 mi)
- Surface elevation: 1,164 metres (3,819 ft)
- References: NVE
- ^{1} Shore length is not a well-defined measure.

Holmevatnet is a lake in the Setesdalsheiene area of Norway. It is located in the mountains on the border of Bykle Municipality in Agder county and Suldal Municipality in Rogaland county. The 4.76-square-kilometre (1.84 sq mi) lake lies just west of the lake Store Urevatn and to the northeast of the lake Blåsjø. The nearest villages are Berdalen in Bykle Municipality, about 20 kilometres (12 mi) to the east and Suldalsosen, about 30 kilometres (19 mi) to the west. The mountain Kaldafjellet lies about 6 kilometres (3.7 mi) north of the lake.

== See also ==
- List of lakes in Aust-Agder
- List of lakes in Norway
