= Longerakvatnet =

Lake in Agder, Norway

- Longeraksvatnet
- Interactive map of Longerakvatnet
- Location: Bygland Municipality, Agder
- Coordinates: 58.7449°N 07.9005°E
- Type: Artificial lake
- Primary outflows: Longeraksåni river
- Basin countries: Norway
- Max. length: 4 kilometres (2.5 mi)
- Max. width: 2.2 kilometres (1.4 mi)
- Surface area: 3.4 km^{2} (1.3 sq mi)
- Shore length^{1}: 23 kilometres (14 mi)
- Surface elevation: 596 metres (1,955 ft)
- References: NVE
- ^{1} Shore length is not a well-defined measure.

Longerakvatnet is a lake in Bygland Municipality in Agder county, Norway. It has a small dam on the southwest side to regulate the water level for hydro-electric power generation at a plant located down the hill. The lake discharges into the Longeraksåni river which flows into the Byglandsfjorden near the village of Longerak. The 3.4-square-kilometre (1.3 sq mi) lake is located about 6 kilometres (3.7 mi) southeast of the village of Lauvdal and about 10 kilometres (6.2 mi) northeast of the village of Byglandsfjord.

== See also ==
- List of lakes in Aust-Agder
- List of lakes in Norway
