= Longerak =

Village in Bygland Municipality, Norway

- Village
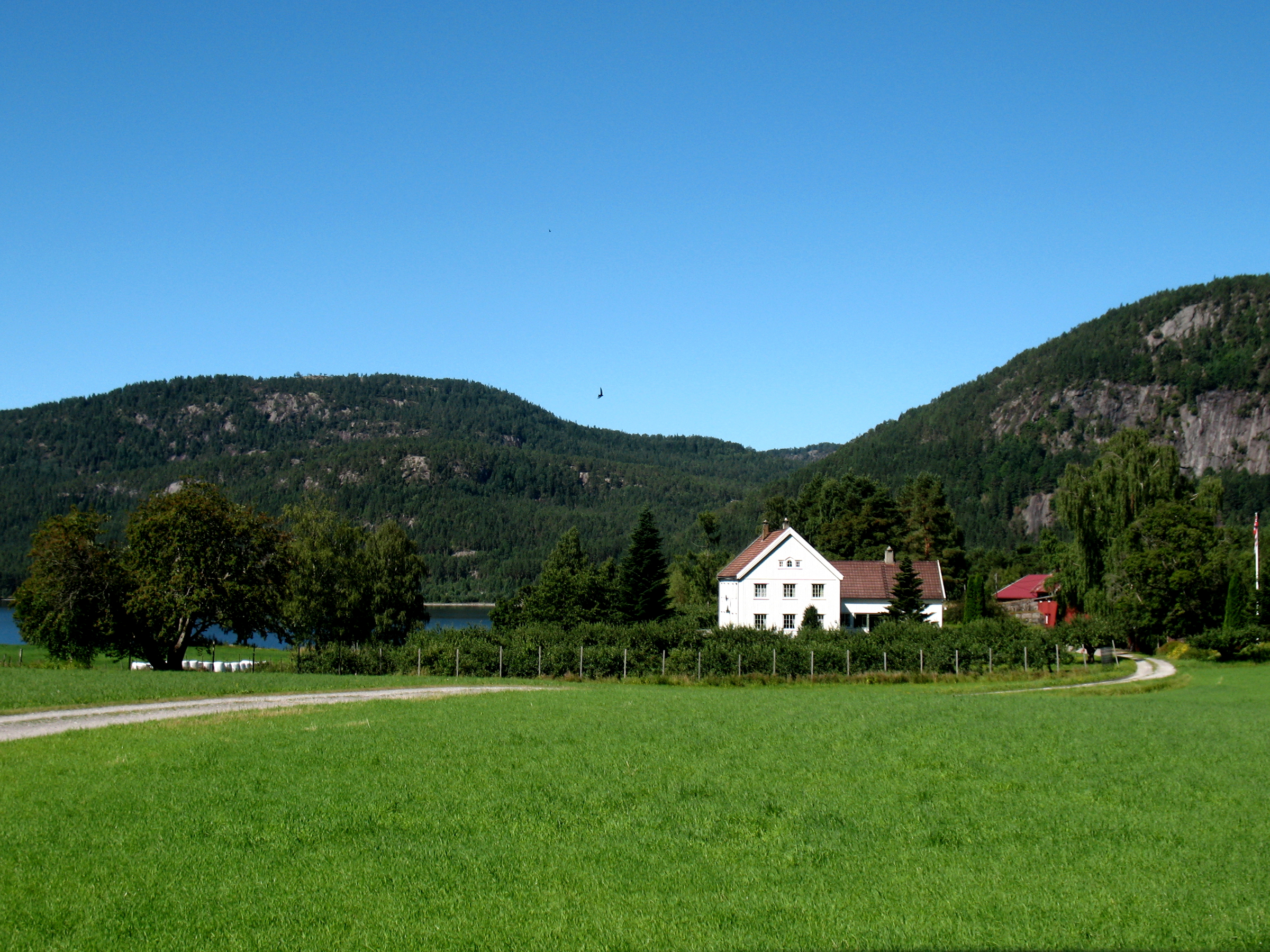
- View of the village
- Interactive map of Longerak
- Coordinates: 58°45′00″N 7°51′00″E
- Country: Norway
- Region: Southern Norway
- County: Agder
- District: Setesdal
- Municipality: Bygland Municipality
- Elevation: 234 m (768 ft)
- Time zone: UTC+01:00 (CET)
  - Summer (DST): UTC+02:00 (CEST)
- Post Code: 4745 Bygland

Longerak is a village in Bygland Municipality in Agder county, Norway. The village is located on the eastern shore of the lake Byglandsfjorden. The village sits along the Norwegian National Road 9, about 7 kilometres (4.3 mi) north of the village of Grendi and about 6 kilometres (3.7 mi) south of Lauvdal. The village of Frøyrak lies about 2 kilometres (1.2 mi) to the west on the other side of the lake. The lake Longerakvatnet lies about 2.5 kilometres (1.6 mi) to the east, high up in the mountains above the village. The water from the lake is used in the Longerak power station to produce hydroelectric power.
