= Uwe Marx =

German physician and biotechnologist (born 1964)

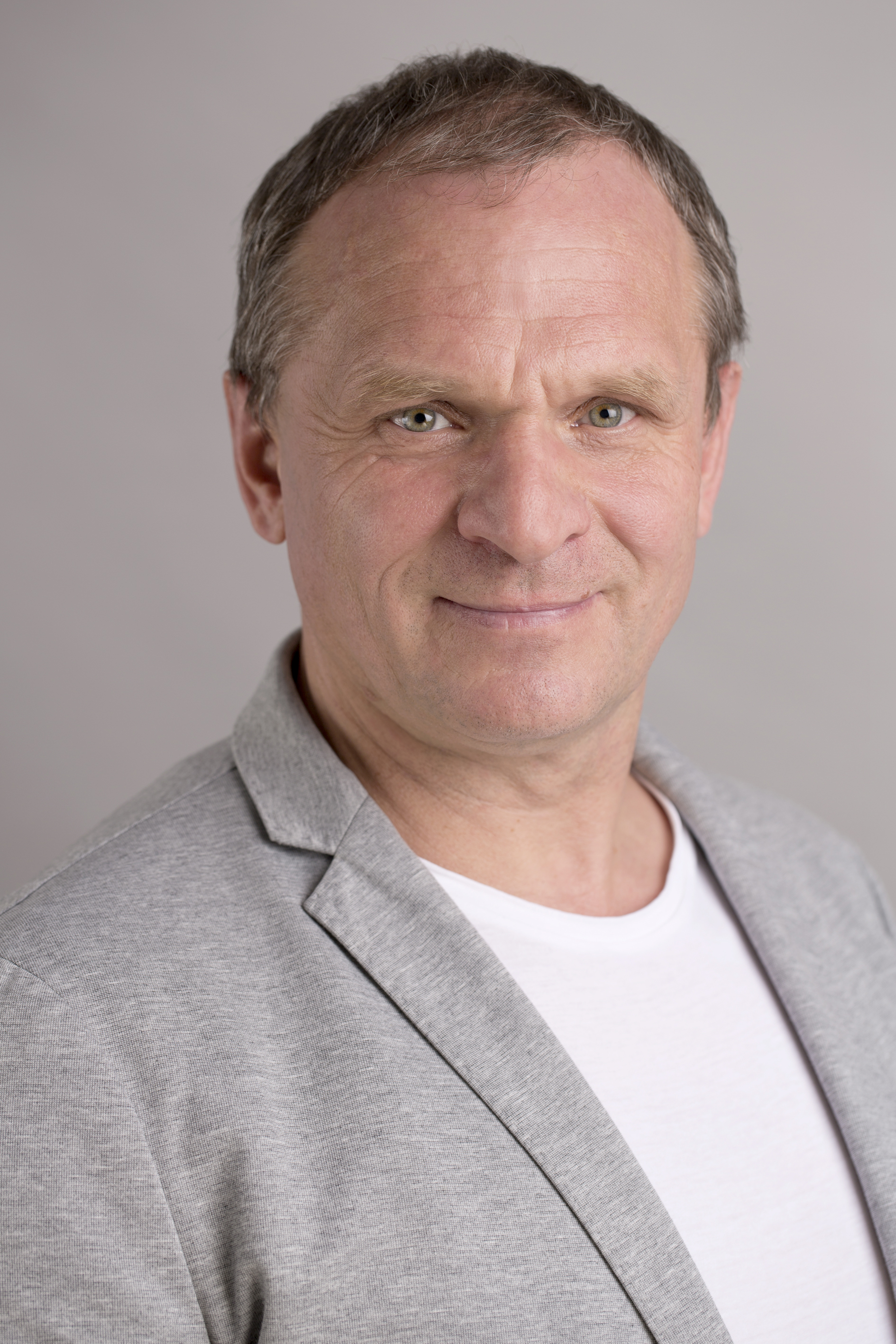
- Born: June 26, 1964; Berlin
- Education: Charité Universitätsmedizin Berlin, Universitätsklinik Leipzig, Technische Universität Berlin
- Known for: Developing human in vitro alternatives to animal models, organ-on-a-chip, human body-on-a-chip technology
- Scientific career
- Fields: Medicine, Biotechnology, Organ-on-a-chip technology, antibody production

Uwe Marx (born 26 June 1964) is a German physician and biotechnologist, and one of the world’s leading researchers in the fields of organ-on-a-chip technology and antibody production.

== Academic Education ==
He gained his qualification as a medical doctor with a specialization in biochemistry in 1988 and his MD in 1991 at Charité – Universitätsmedizin Berlin (a joint medical faculty of the Humboldt University and Free University Berlin) with his thesis on Human Monoclonal Antibodies.

== Professional Academic Positions ==
Marx was the head of the Department of Immunobiotechnology at the Institute of Medical Immunology, Charite – Universitätsmedizin Berlin between 1991 and 1995. He was the head of the Department of Medical Biotechnology at the Institute of Immunology and Transfusion Medicine, University of Leipzig between 1995 and 2000. He was the head of the GO-Bio Multi-Organ Chip Program “Multi-organ-bioreactors for the predictive substance testing in chip format,” which was supported by the German Federal Ministry of Education and Research (BMBF), at the Institute of Biotechnology, Technische Universität Berlin between 2010 and 2019. This led to the establishment of a multi-organ chip technology capable of maintaining more than 15 miniature human organ equivalents, such as liver, brain, skin, intestine and pancreatic islets, at a homeostatic steady state over periods of at least four weeks. Marx was appointed an Honorary Professor of Medical Biotechnology at the Technische Universität Berlin in 2022.

== Career ==
Marx is a world-renowned German physician and biotechnologist, specializing in the fields of organ-on-a-chip technology and antibody production. He is a physician, biotechnologist, successful serial entrepreneur, author, and inventor of as many as 30 patent families, which have led to more than 140 patents granted. He has published more than 130 peer-reviewed scientific papers. He is the co-founder of the German biotech companies: VITA 34 A.G., ProBioGen A.G. and TissUse GmbH.He has extensive experience in human biology and medicine, and is currently one of the world’s leading researchers in the field of microphysiological systems (MPS) technology, pioneering the field of human multi-organ chips. He was an early innovator in employing relevant non-animal models to develop more predictive human data with a vision to define human risk better and make safe drugs available to the patients faster. When he began his career in the early 1990s, rodents and higher species were used, to a large extent, to test the effects of pharmaceutical products, cosmetic compounds and other chemicals. He quickly recognized that the results of animal testing may not guarantee the same responses in humans. Improving the relevance to humans and potentially replacing animal testing with a more accurate and controllable approach was an urgent need. In 1989, while studying for his MD, he planned to recreate human immune organs and mimic organ functions and interactions outside a living organism.

One of his first research projects in 1991 involved the “in vitro production of monoclonal antibodies (mAbs)” to replace the standard method to “culture […] hybridoma cells producing monoclonal antibodies in the ascites mouse.” He and his team developed a hollow-fiber culture system for culturing hybridoma cells, which produce mAbs. He was, therefore, able to show that an in vivo method could replace the highly criticized ascites mouse method by applying advanced biotechnology to cell culture. In 1994, Marx was one of the founders of ProBioGen AG, in Berlin. He joined the company as Chief Scientific Officer in 2000. Within this biotech company, he developed, among other products, a Human Artificial Lymph Node (HuALN) model which enables the prediction of human immune responses triggered by drug candidates in vitro. Using primary cells, this three-dimensional matrix bioreactor technology emulates in vivo-like reactions of a human lymph node to analyze, for example, immunogenicity, immune functions and the immunotoxicity of substances. He was the CSO of ProBioGen AG until 2010. In 1997, Marx was one of the founders of VITA 34 AG, in Leipzig, where he established the GMP-compliant cryopreservation process for the umbilical cord blood samples. Between 1999 and 2003, he was one of the founders and a supervisory board member of Novoplant AG, in Gatersleben, which ceased trading in 2008. In 2007, while still at ProBioGen AG, Marx published his vision of the multi-organ-chip (MOC) concept for the first time in his book “Drug Testing In Vitro – Breakthroughs and Trends in Cell Culture Technology”. He describes the concept of the “micro-organoids” on which the perfused human MOC is based, in Chapter 11 (p. 318), “How drug development of the 21st century could benefit from human micro-organoid in vitro technologies,” as follows:

- Organs are built up by multiple, identical, functionally self-reliant structural micro-organoid units.
- Micro-organoids are evolutionarily conserved and subject to genetically encoded self-assembly.

In order to overcome the limited predictive power of preclinical testing in animal models, which has been the main dilemma of drug development, Marx proposed developing the perfused MOC using human cells, tissues and organoids. He is internationally recognized as one of the inventors of the perfused MOC technology. Since 2009, Marx has been working together with other scientists to reproduce the human organism on a microfluidic chip at a scale of 1:100,000. The aim is to shorten the entire drug development process and reduce animal experiments and drug testing in humans during clinical trials.

In 2010, Marx founded TissUse GmbH, the first MOC company worldwide, as a spin-off biotech company of the Department of Medical Biotechnology of the Technische Universität Berlin (chair: Prof. Roland Lauster), which has been at the forefront of “pioneering human-on-a-chip developments.” He was CEO of the company from 2010 until 2020, when he became CSO. In 2013, TissUse GmbH published the proof of concept of the perfused human two-tissue MOC, “A dynamic multi-organ-chip for long-term cultivation and substance testing proven by 3D human liver and skin tissue co-culture.” The final aim is to combine different “organoids” to generate a human-on-a-chip, which allows studies of complex physiological organs interactions. The inclusion of human organ equivalents for liver, intestine, kidney and skin for ADME and toxicity (ADMET) testing was developed in a four-organ chip. The system is being developed for disease models for preclinical efficacy and toxicity testing of new drugs. An example is the human microfluidic two-organ chip model which maintained a functional circulation between pancreatic islet micro-tissues and liver spheroids in an insulin-free medium; this is a promising simulation of human type 2 diabetes mellitus. Marx’s team at TissUse GmbH has also succeeded in generating different human organoids for induced pluripotent stem cells (hiPSC) lines from donors, which were generated by reprogramming peripheral blood mononuclear cells with episomal vectors. This technology allows one to study drug effects in MOCs on individuals with different genetic backgrounds, for example, human disease models. Meanwhile, Tissue has developed a wide range of fit-for-purpose MOCS for the drug industry and four of these assays are used for internal portfolio decision-making in drug development: the bone marrow model and three of the two-organ models – the liver-pancreas, the liver-thyroid and the skin-tumor model. These four commercial assays have entered industrial decision-making at six sites of international drug companies, such as AstraZeneca, Roche and Bayer.

Since 2014, Marx has successfully promoted the use of human MOCs by industry and regulators around the world as a keynote speaker and workshop organizer. He gave a keynote lecture entitled “Human-on-a-chip – a paradigm shift from animal testing” at the 9th World Congress on Alternatives in Prague, in 2014, and he was co-organizer of the round table discussion “Human-on-a-chip – Advancing regulatory science through innovation and worldwide networking for alternative testing” at the same congress. In 2014, Marx hosted the t4 workshop “Biology-inspired micro-physiological system approaches to solve the predictive dilemma of substance testing”, and in 2019, hosted the t4 workshop “Biology-inspired micro-physiological systems to advance medicines for patient benefit and animal welfare.”

In 2021, Marx and his colleagues introduced the “Organismoid Theory” based on the human-on-a-chip concepts of the past in Frontiers in Medicine. His team “describe the current concept and principles to create a series of organismoids – minute, mindless and emotion-free physiological in vitro equivalents of an individual’s mature human body – by an artificially short process of morphogenetic self-assembly mimicking an individual’s ontogenesis from egg cell to sexually mature organism. Subsequently, we provide the concept and principles to maintain such an individual’s set of organismoids at self-sustained functional healthy homeostasis over very long time frames in vitro. Principles how to perturb a subset of healthy organismoids by means of the natural or artificial induction of diseases are enrolled to emulate an individual’s disease process. Finally, we discuss using such series of healthy and perturbed organismoids in predictively selecting, scheduling and dosing an individual patient’s personalized therapy or medicine precisely. The potential impact of the organismoid theory on our healthcare system generally and the rapid adoption of disruptive personalized T-cell therapies particularly is highlighted.”

Marx is continuing to develop solutions for patients’ benefit and the reduction and replacement of animal experimentation. His work regarding the latter has led to his receiving several awards in the field, including the most prestigious 2021 Russell & Burch Award from the Humane Society of the United States.

One challenging aspect in achieving a benefit for a patient by utilizing MPS-based technologies is bringing such platforms into general use in medicine. Scientific, standardization and regulatory acceptance hurdles need to be overcome. Marx’s work in the stakeholder community contributes, for example, by hosting the 2nd MPS World Summit in Berlin in 2023, Germany, and the CAAT stakeholder workshops in the MPS field.

== Memberships ==
- 2008-2013 Biotechnology section of DECHEMA e.V.: Elected member of the board
- 2000-2009 Working party cell culture technology of DECHEMA e.V.: Elected head of working party
- Since 1998 German Society of Immunology: Member
- Since 1996 Working party cell culture technology of DECHEMA e.V.: Elected member

== Selected honors and awards ==
- 2012 – Dorothy Hegarty Award: Alternatives to Laboratory Animals: Best Article in ATLA
- 2014 – Animal Protection Research Prize: German Ministry of Agriculture and Consumer safety: Achievements in replacing laboratory animal testing
- 2017 – Best Article Award: Alternatives to Laboratory Animals: Best Article Award
- 2021 – Russell & Burch Award: The United States of America Humane Society: For the Advancement of Replacement, Reduction and Refinement of Animals in Research

== Selected publications ==
- (2016) Validation of bioreactor and human-on-a-chip devices for chemical safety assessment. (Chapter 12) Eds. Eskes and Whelan: Validating Alternative Methods for Toxicity Testing. Springer book. Rebelo, S.P.; Dehne, E.-M.; Brito, C.; Horland, R.; Alves, P.M.; Marx, U.
- (2016) Marx et al. t4 report: "Organs and Humans-on-a-chip" – a biology-inspired microphysiological systems approach to solve the current drug development dilemma. ALTEX 33(3). 30 authors.
- (2012) Human-on-a-chip’ Developments: A Translational Cutting edge Alternative to Systemic Safety Assessment and Efficiency Evaluation of Substances in Laboratory Animals and Man? ATLA, 40, 235-257. Marx, U.; Walles, H.; Hoffmann, S.; Lindner, G.; Horland, R.; Sonntag, F.; Klotzbach, U.; Sakharov, D.; Tonevitsky, A.; Lauster, R.
