= Strondefjell =

Mountain in Agder, Norway

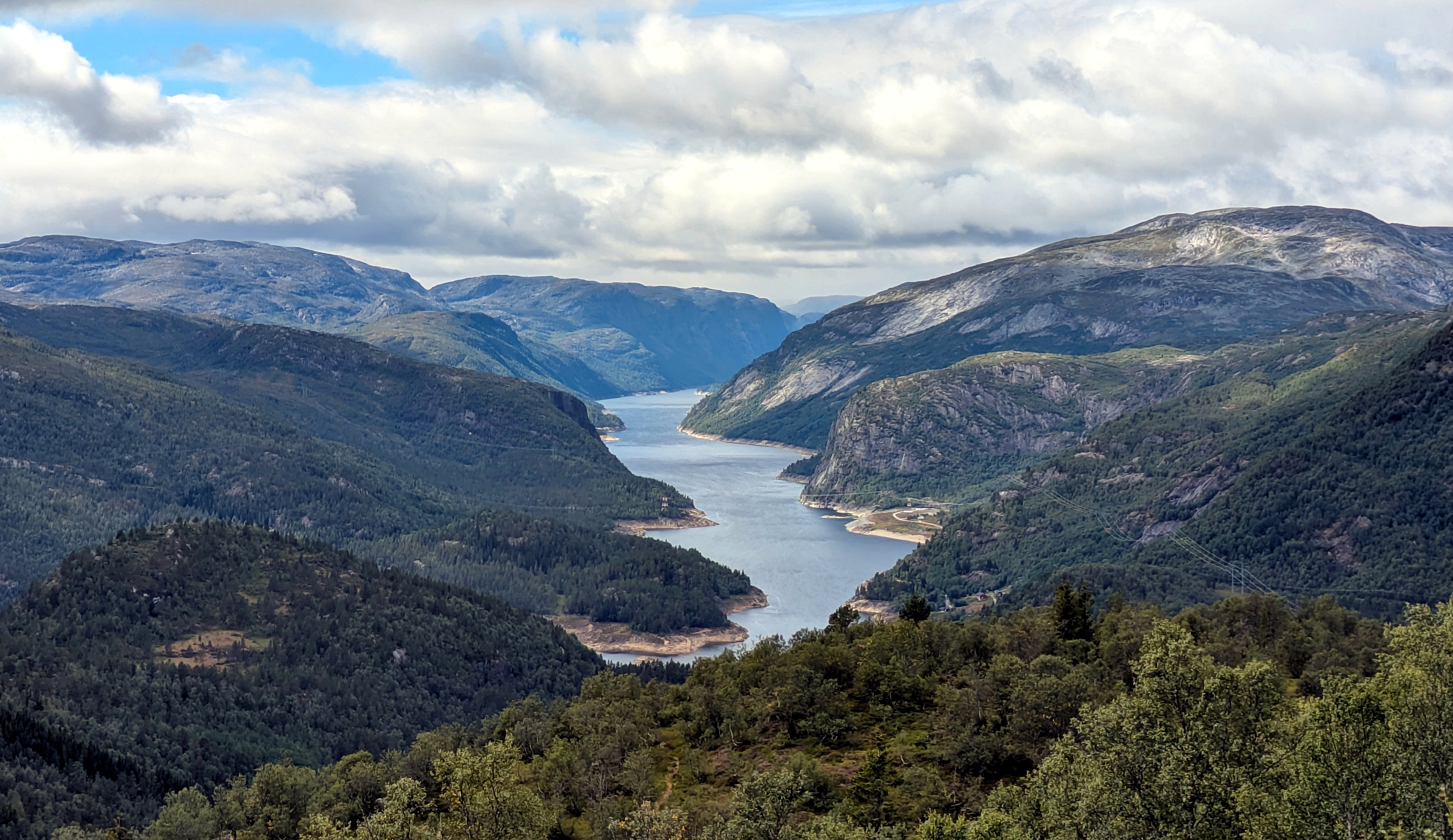
- From left to right: Steinheii, Botsvatn, Strondefjell (in the background Sandvasshorten, looking west)

Highest point
- Elevation: 1,394 m (4,573 ft)
- Prominence: 117 m (384 ft)
- Parent peak: Ytre Djuptjønnuten
- Isolation: 2.6 km (1.6 mi)
- Coordinates: 59°20′42″N 7°09′35″E

Geography
- Location: Agder, Norway
- Parent range: Setesdalsheiene

Strondefjell is a mountain in Bykle Municipality in Agder county, Norway. The 1,394-metre (4,573 ft) tall mountain has a topographic prominence of 117 metres (384 ft). The mountain is the 23rd highest in the whole county. The mountain sits in the Setesdalsheiene mountains on the northern shore of the lake Botsvatn, about 10 kilometres (6.2 mi) straight west of the village of Bykle.

== See also ==
- List of mountains of Norway
