= Ytre Storevatnet =

Lake in Agder, Norway

- Storvatnet
- Interactive map of Ytre Storevatnet
- Location: Bykle Municipality, Agder
- Coordinates: 59.25333°N 6.9161°E
- Primary inflows: Storsteinvatnet
- Primary outflows: Svartevatnet
- Catchment area: Sira watershed
- Basin countries: Norway
- Max. length: 3.5 kilometres (2.2 mi)
- Max. width: 1.8 kilometres (1.1 mi)
- Surface area: 2.8 km^{2} (1.1 sq mi)
- Shore length^{1}: 12 kilometres (7.5 mi)
- Surface elevation: 899 metres (2,949 ft)
- References: NVE
- ^{1} Shore length is not a well-defined measure.

Ytre Storevatnet is a lake in Bykle Municipality in Agder county, Norway. The 2.8-square-kilometre (1.1 sq mi) lake makes up the northernmost part of the Svartevatnet reservoir that empties into the Sira River system. The lake is located just south of the lake Blåsjø and southwest of Botsvatn. The village of Bykle is about 25 kilometres (16 mi) northeast of the lake.

== See also ==
- List of lakes in Aust-Agder
