= Åraksbø =

Village in Bygland Municipality, Norway

- Village
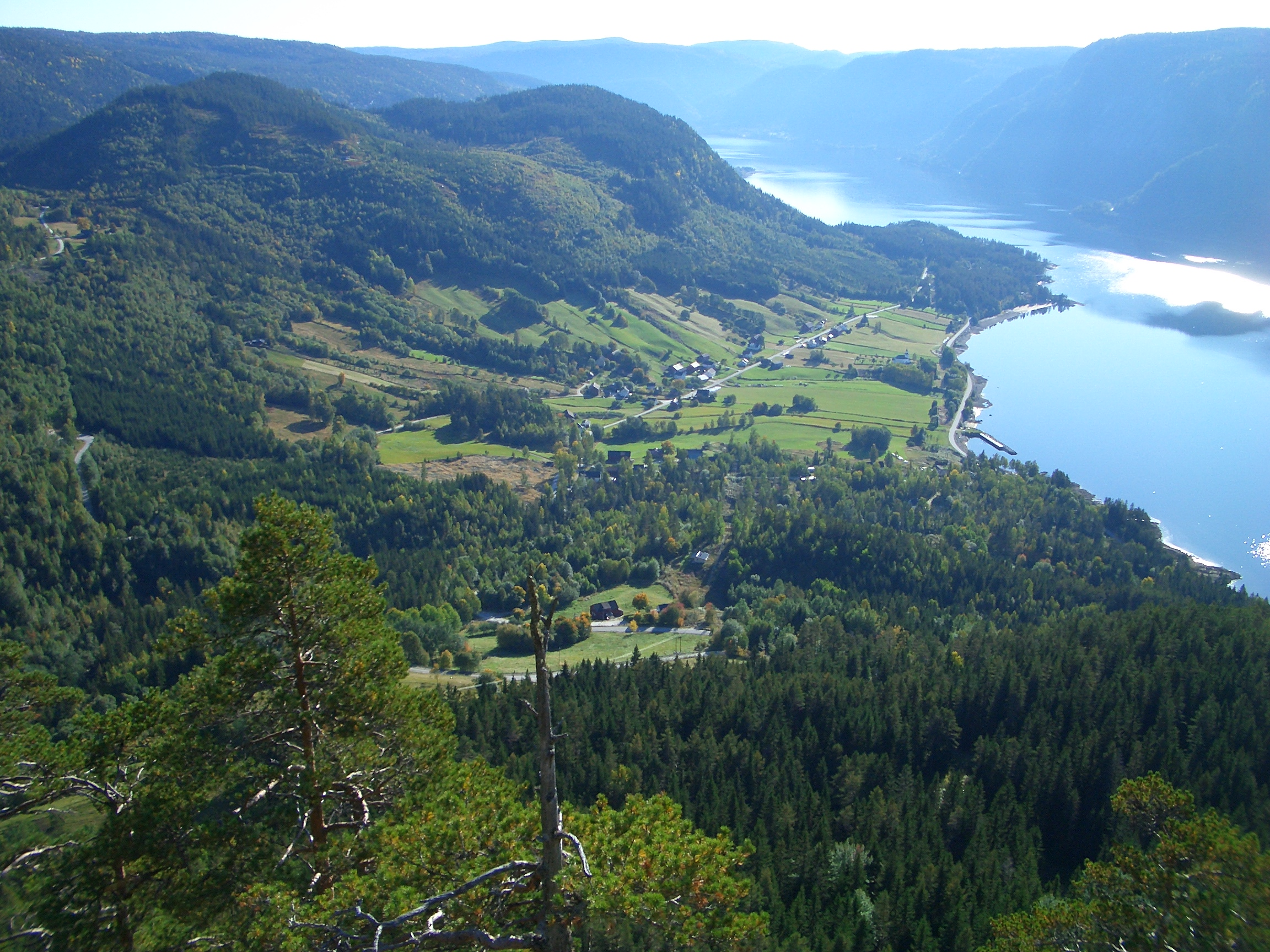
- View of the village, looking south
- Interactive map of Åraksbø
- Coordinates: 58.9211°N 07.7466°E
- Country: Norway
- Region: Southern Norway
- County: Agder
- District: Setesdal
- Municipality: Bygland Municipality
- Elevation: 241 m (791 ft)
- Time zone: UTC+01:00 (CET)
  - Summer (DST): UTC+02:00 (CEST)
- Post Code: 4745 Bygland

Åraksbø is a village in Bygland Municipality in Agder county, Norway. The village is located on the eastern shore of the Åraksfjorden, about 5 kilometres (3.1 mi) north of the village of Sandnes and about 6 kilometres (3.7 mi) southeast of the village of Ose. The population (2001) of the Åraksbø area was 89.

The lake Hovatn and its hydroelectric power plant are located about 5 kilometres (3.1 mi) to the northeast, just north of the village of Litveit. Sandnes Church has been located in this village since 1935, prior to that time, it was located in the village of Sandnes, a few kilometers to the south.
