= Uwe Mund =

Uwe Mund may refer to:

- Uwe Mund (conductor) (born 1941), Austrian conductor
- Uwe Mund (rower) (born 1962), German rower
