= Store Bjørnevatn =

Lake in Agder, Norway

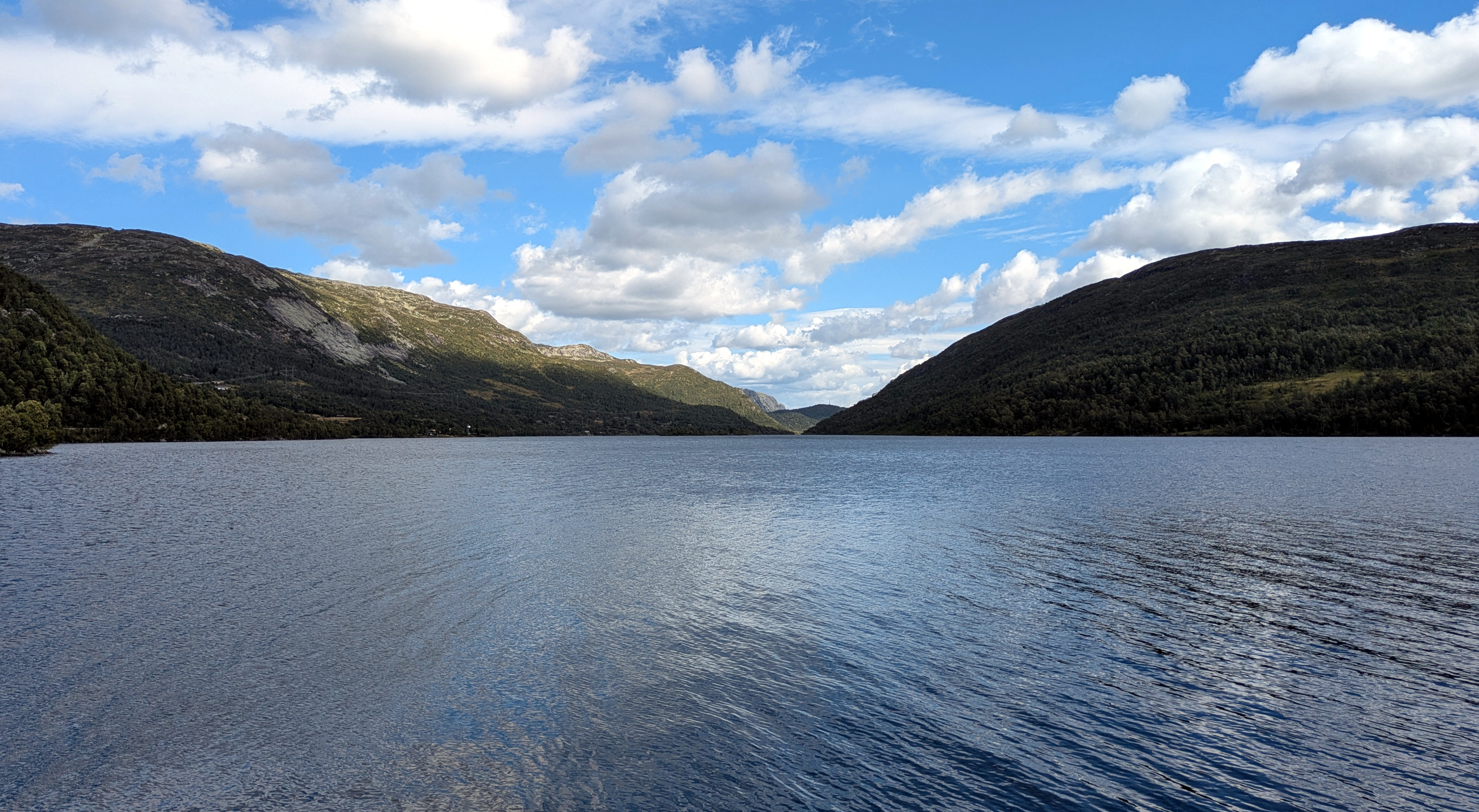
- Interactive map of Store Bjørnevatn
- Location: Valle Municipality, Agder
- Coordinates: 59.33972°N 7.51889°E
- Basin countries: Norway
- Max. length: 6 kilometres (3.7 mi)
- Max. width: 700 metres (2,300 ft)
- Surface area: 2.43 km^{2} (0.94 sq mi)
- Shore length^{1}: 13.74 kilometres (8.54 mi)
- Surface elevation: 801 metres (2,628 ft)
- References: NVE
- ^{1} Shore length is not a well-defined measure.

Store Bjørnevatn is a lake in Valle Municipality in Agder county, Norway. The lake is located in the northern part of the municipality, near the village of Rygnestad, and about 15 kilometres (9.3 mi) north of the municipal center of Valle and about 10 kilometres (6.2 mi) straight east of the village of Bykle in the neighboring municipality. The lake has an area of 2.43 square kilometres (0.94 sq mi) at an elevation of 801 metres (2,628 ft) above sea level.

== See also ==
- List of lakes in Norway
