= Klaus-Uwe Gerhardt =

German economist, columnist, and author (born 1955)

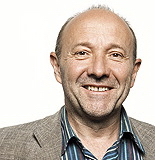
Gerhardt in 2009

Klaus-Uwe Gerhardt (born 1955) is a German economist, columnist, and author. His scientific work concentrates on labour economics and social policy. He works as economic teacher und scientist. Through several books and articles he contributes to the sociopolitical discourse. Gerhardt was a pioneer in the German debate on Guaranteed minimum income (GMI) in the early 1980s. GMI is a proposed system of social welfare provision that guarantees a basic income for all citizens or families.

== Life and profession ==
Klaus-Uwe Gerhardt holds a degree in commerce and a doctorate in economics, studied at the Johann Wolfgang-Goethe University in Frankfurt am Main, at the Technical University of Darmstadt and a doctorate at the Potsdam Institute for Climate Impact Research (PIK), (University of Potsdam). Research areas: Labour market, social and educational policy. Focus most recently on economic and social history.

Klaus-Uwe Gerhardt is married, has two children and two grandchildren. He grew up in and lives in Obertshausen, Hesse.

== Books ==
- Bürgergeld für alle? Geschichte und Zukunft eines liberalen Vorschlags, Baden-Baden: Nomos, ISBN 978-3-756-02306-6, 2025
- Hartz plus. Lohnsubventionen und Mindesteinkommen im Niedriglohnsektor, Wiesbaden: VS Verlag für Sozialwissenschaften, ISBN 978-3-531-14842-7, 2006 (Dissertation)
- Das Speenhamland-System als frühes Grundeinkommen. Vorgeschichte, Wirkungen und Erkenntnisse, ISBN 9783346290106, 2020
- Erwachsenenbildung und Neue Techniken. Auswirkungen der veränderten Sozial- und Wirtschaftsstruktur auf Qualifikationsanforderungen, Kursteilnehmer und Volkshochschule, Offenbach/M.: Eigenverlag, ISBN 978-3-00-020697-9, 1986
- Die sozialen Auswirkungen der Integration von CAD und CAM. Vorstudie für ein empirisches Hauptprojekt. Teilprojekt II des RKW-Projekts A148/83 „Wirtschaftliche und soziale Auswirkungen des Einsatzes von integrierten CAD/CAM-Systemen“ (mit Hoß, D./Kramer, H./Weber, A.), Frankfurt/Main: Institut für Sozialforschung, 1983

Articles

- Das dicke Ende kommt noch. Ist Schwarz-Gelb gut für ein Grundeinkommen?, in: AKP - Fachzeitschrift für Alternative Kommunal Politik, 6/2009, 30. Jhg., S. 48-50, Bielefeld, ISSN 0941-9225, 2009
- Langzeitarbeitslosigkeit und Grundeinkommen. Strukturveränderungen in der Krise, in: AKP - Fachzeitschrift für Alternative Kommunal Politik, 3/2009, 30. Jhg., S. 61-63, Bielefeld, ISSN 0941-9225, 2009
- Garantiertes Mindesteinkommen - eine Forderung für alle(s)? In: Widersprüche 103, S. 103-117, ISBN 978-3-89370-426-2, 2007
- Mindesteinkommen - Konservativ oder libertär (mit Arnd Weber), in: T. Kreuder und H. Loewy (Hg.), Konservativismus in der Strukturkrise, S. 462-483, Frankfurt/M.: Suhrkamp, ISBN 3-518-11330-5, 1987
- Garantiertes Mindesteinkommen als Möglichkeit sozialrechtlicher Absicherung alternativer Arbeitsformen. Am Beispiel Telearbeit, ETH-Zürich, Grin-Verlag, ISBN 978-3-640-11912-7, E-Book ISBN 978-3-640-14397-9, 1987[2008]
- Garantiertes Mindesteinkommen. Für einen libertären Umgang mit der Krise (mit Arnd Weber), in: T. Schmid (Hrsg.), Befreiung von falscher Arbeit. Thesen zum garantierten Mindesteinkommen, 2. erheblich veränderte Auflage, S. 18-70, Berlin: Wagenbach-Verlag, ISBN 3-8031-2109-4, 1986
- Eigeninitiative und Sozialpolitik. Zur Diskussion eines garantierten Mindesteinkommens, in: Widersprüche 14, S. 61-69, ISBN 3-88534-032-1, 1985
- Garantiertes Mindesteinkommen (mit Arnd Weber), Alemantschen. Materialien für radikale Ökologie, Ökologische Berufspraxis, hrsg. von der Gesellschaft für Kultur und Ökologie e. V., Band 3, Maintal, S. 69-99, 1983
- Die Problematik der negativen Einkommensteuer, Frankfurt/Main, Diplomarbeit, Grin-Verlag, [www.hausarbeiten.de], ISBN 978-3-640-11912-7, E-Book ISBN 978-3-640-08962-8, 1980[2007])
