= OVI =

OVI may refer to:

- Ohio Volunteer Infantry, volunteer regiment during the American Civil War
- Operating a Vehicle under the Influence (of alcohol and/or drugs)
- Optically Variable Ink, anti-counterfeiting measure in currency
- Open Verilog International, now Accellera

Ovi may refer to:

- Ovi (Nokia), former brand for Nokia's Internet services
- Ovi Magazine, an online magazine based in Helsinki, Finland
- Ovi (poetry), an Indian poetic metre
- Ovi (rapper), Cuban rapper and singer
- Ovi (music), a form of wedding music predominantly seen among the Hindu and Catholic community in Goa, India
- Alexander Ovechkin (born 1985), Russian hockey player
- Ovidiu Cernăuțeanu (born 1974), Romanian singer
- Õvi, village in Tartu Parish, Tartu County, Estonia
