= Breidvatn =

Lake in Agder, Norway

- Breivatn
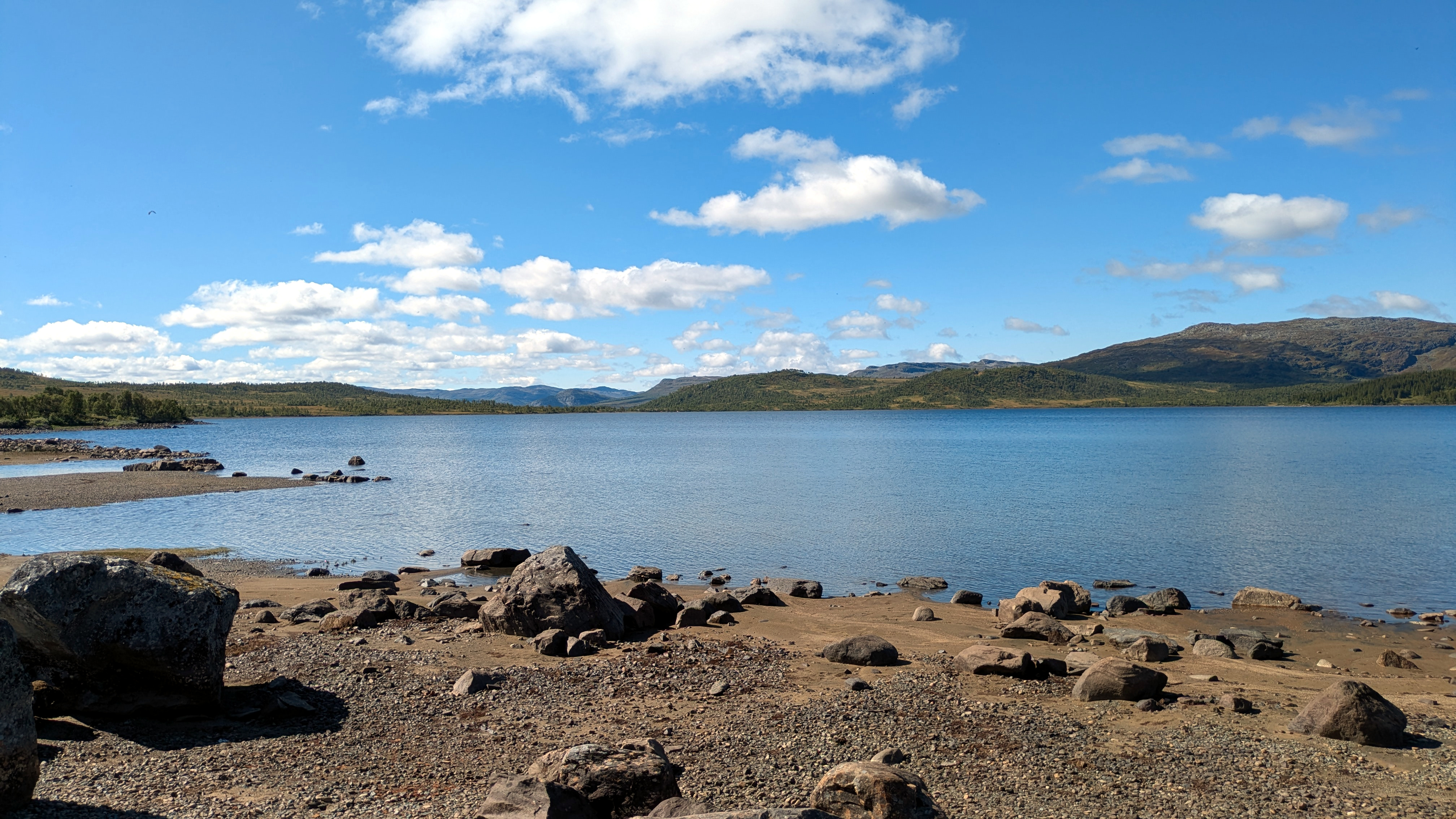
- Interactive map of Breidvatn
- Location: Bykle Municipality, Agder
- Coordinates: 59.62843°N 7.43214°E
- Type: Reservoir
- Primary outflows: Otra
- Basin countries: Norway
- Max. length: 2.65 kilometres (1.65 mi)
- Max. width: 2.7 kilometres (1.7 mi)
- Surface area: 3.5 km^{2} (1.4 sq mi)
- Water volume: 16.6×10^{6} m^{3} (5.9×10^{8} cu ft)
- Surface elevation: 896 metres (2,940 ft)
- References: NVE

Breidvatn is a lake in Bykle Municipality in Agder county, Norway. The village of Bjåen lies along the northern shore of the lake. The Norwegian National Road 9 runs along the eastern shore of the lake.

The 3.5-square-kilometre (1.4 sq mi) lake lies in the northern part of the Setesdal valley, along the Setesdalsheiane mountains. It has an outlet to the south to the river Otra. The main inlets are Bjålaupet, which enters from Sæsvatn in the north, and Kaldsåi from the west. Together with Sæsvatn, Breidvatn is regulated as a reservoir for the power plants further down the Otra river watershed.

== See also ==
- List of lakes in Norway
