= Sandnes Church (Agder) =

Church in Agder, Norway

- Sandnes kyrkje
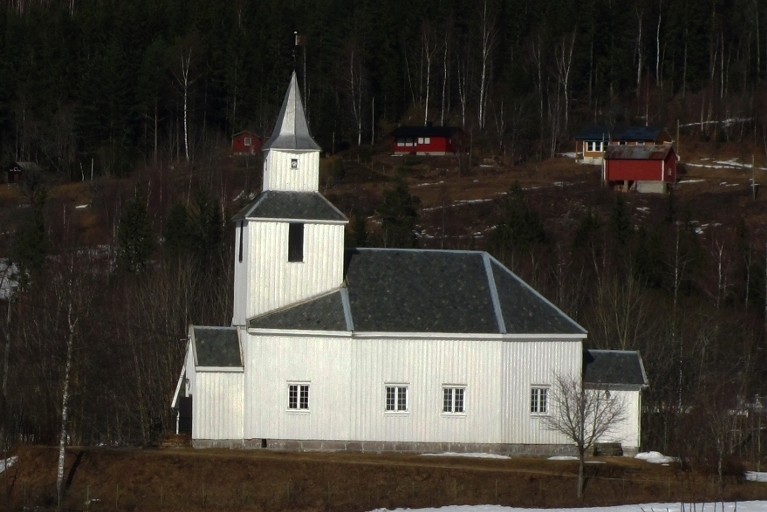
- View of the church
- Sandnes Church
- 58.917687°N 07.73818°E
- Location: Bygland Municipality, Agder
- Country: Norway
- Denomination: Church of Norway
- Previous denomination: Catholic Church
- Churchmanship: Evangelical Lutheran

History
- Status: Parish church
- Founded: 14th century
- Consecrated: 1844
- Events: 1935: building was moved

Architecture
- Functional status: Active
- Architect: Hans Linstow
- Architectural type: Octagonal
- Completed: 1844 (182 years ago)

Specifications
- Capacity: 200
- Materials: Wood

Administration
- Diocese: Agder og Telemark
- Deanery: Otredal prosti
- Parish: Bygland og Årdal
- Norwegian Cultural Heritage Site
- Type: Church
- Status: Listed
- ID: 85389

Sandnes Church (Norwegian: Sandnes kyrkje) is a parish church of the Church of Norway in Bygland Municipality in Agder county, Norway. It is located in the village of Åraksbø on the east side of the Åraksfjorden. It is one of the churches for the Bygland og Årdal parish which is part of the Otredal prosti (deanery) in the Diocese of Agder og Telemark. The white, wooden church was built in a octagonal design in 1844 by Anders Thorsen Syrtveit who used plans drawn up by the famous architect Hans Linstow. The church seats about 200 people.

== History ==
The earliest existing historical records of the church date back to the year 1437, but the church was not new at that time. The church was originally built (probably in the 14th century) on the shore of the Byglandsfjorden in the village of Sandnes. The first church on the site was likely a stave church. That building was torn down in the early 1680s and replaced with a new building on the same site. Not much is known about this building. In 1844, the old church was torn down and a new octagonal building was constructed on the same site. That same year, the cemetery was enlarged and a wall built around the cemetery.

In 1935, the church was disassembled at its historic site in Sandnes and moved to the more populous village of Åraksbø, about 4 kilometres (2.5 mi) to the north, where it was reconstructed. The materials were hauled on the frozen Byglandsfjorden from the old site to the new site. The move had been contemplated for over 40 years since Åraksbø is where almost all the residents of the parish lived. This was a practical move, but it was also controversial. When the newly reconstructed church was re-consecrated in October 1935 by the Bishop, no one from Frøysnes and Sandnes (where the old church stood) came to the service as a way of protesting the move. As a way of smoothing things over, a small chapel was built on the site in Sandnes where the church once stood. The chapel was completed in 1940. There is no cemetery at the new church site, but the cemetery at the old site is still in use.

== Media gallery ==
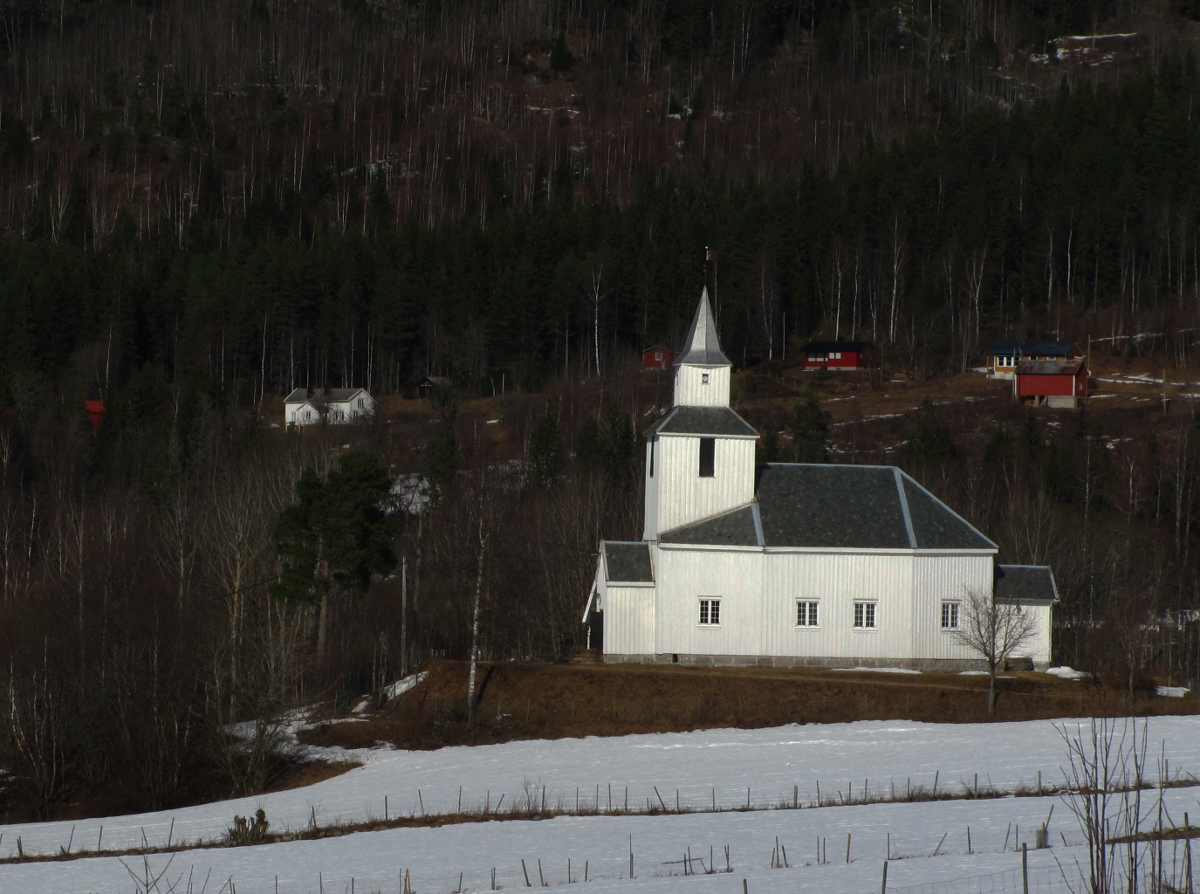

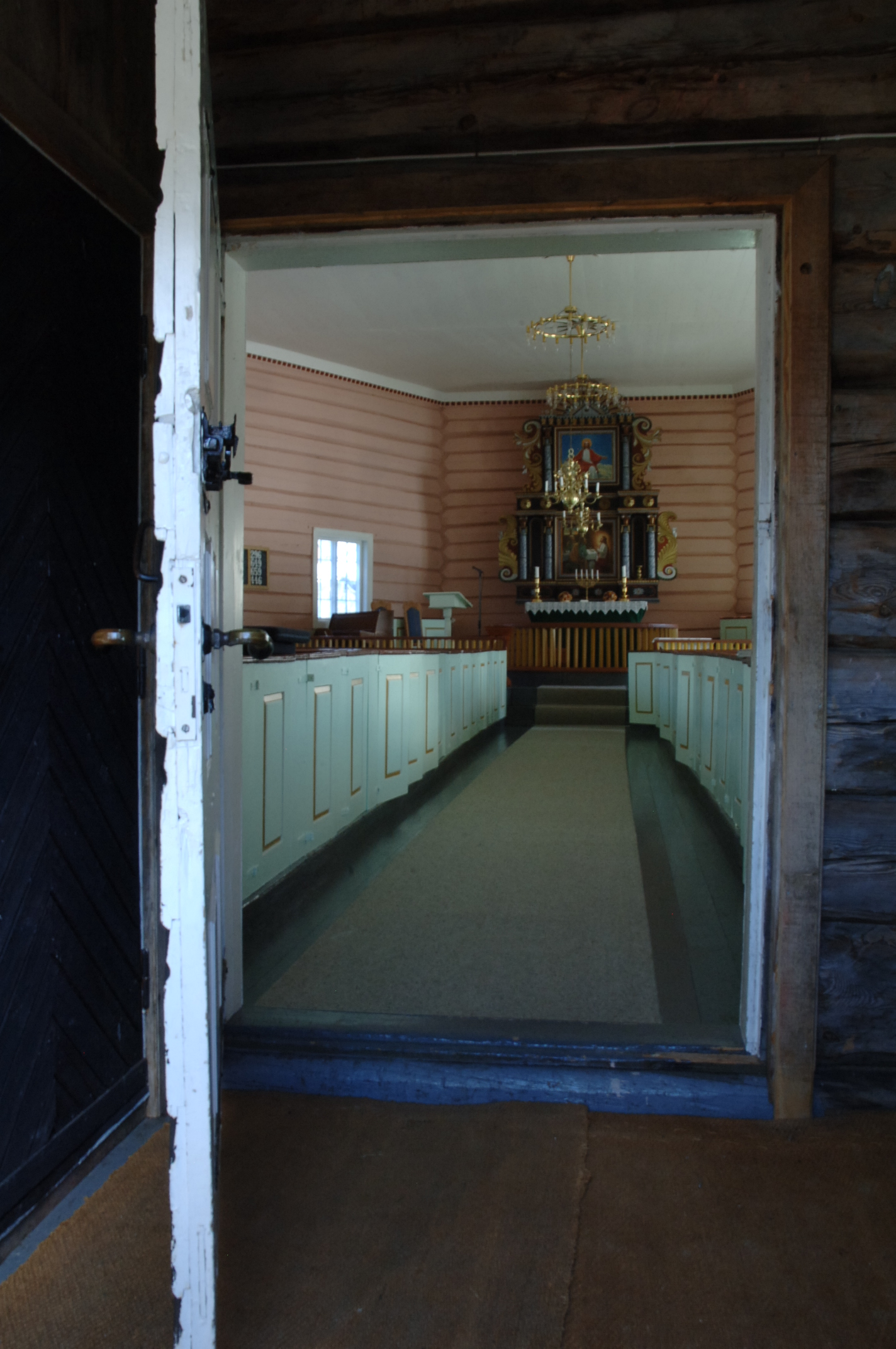

== See also ==
- List of churches in Agder og Telemark
