= Rore (lake) =

Lake in Norway

- Rorevatn (historic)
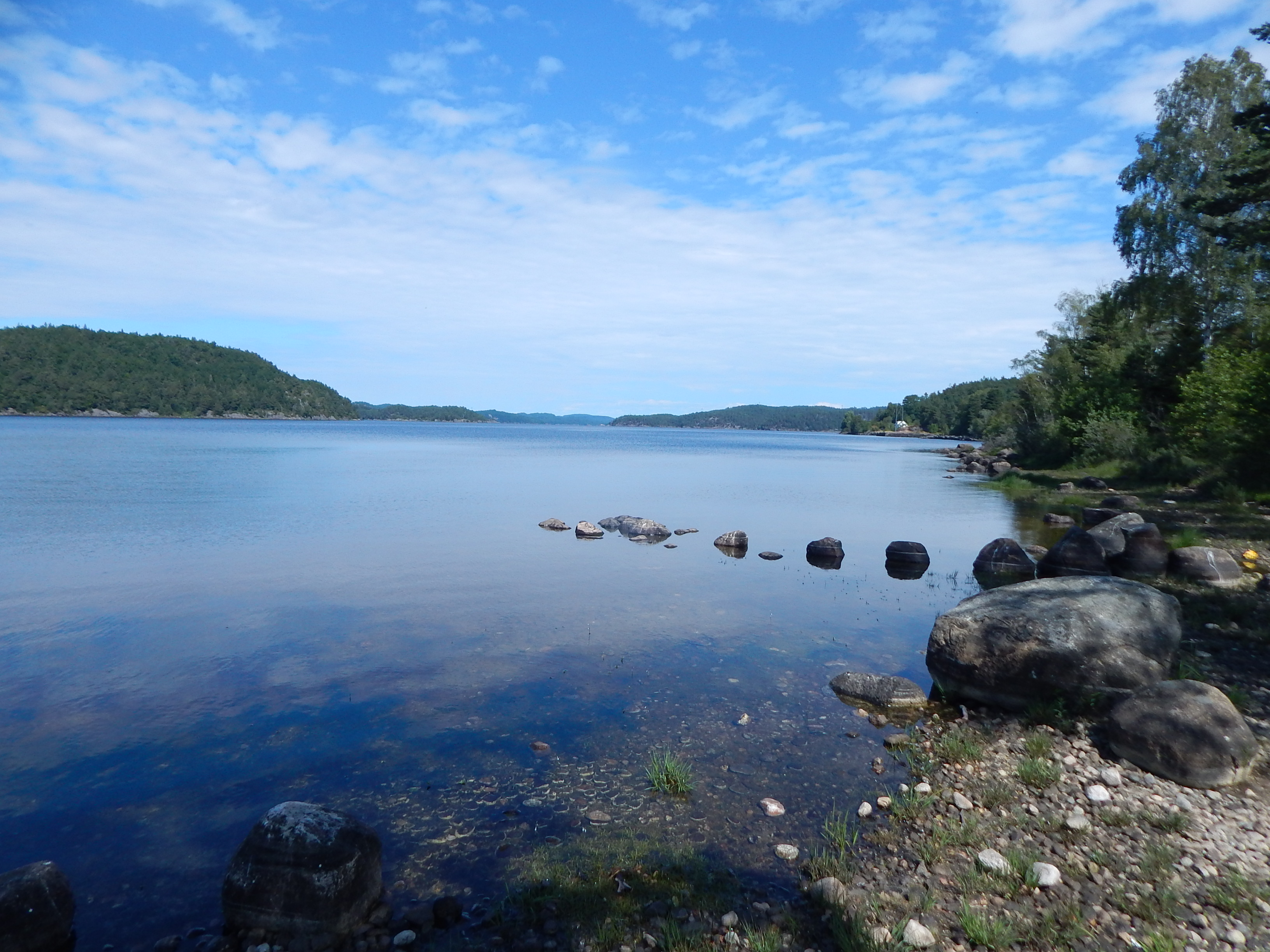
- View of the lake
- Location: Grimstad and Arendal, Agder
- Coordinates: 58.38639°N 8.55444°E
- Type: Reservoir
- Primary inflows: Syndle lake
- Primary outflows: Nidelva river
- Basin countries: Norway
- Max. length: 8 kilometres (5.0 mi)
- Max. width: 2.5 kilometres (1.6 mi)
- Surface area: 7.76 km^{2} (3.00 sq mi)
- Shore length^{1}: 38 kilometres (24 mi)
- Surface elevation: 39 metres (128 ft)
- References: NVE

Location
- Interactive map of Rore
- ^{1} Shore length is not a well-defined measure.

Rore is a lake and reservoir in Agder county, Norway. This lake lies mostly in Grimstad Municipality, but the northeastern end crosses over into the neighboring Arendal Municipality. There is a public beach area at the southern end of the lake, near the village of Roresand. The lake is located about 3 kilometres (1.9 mi) from the center of the town of Grimstad.

The lake Syndle flows into Rore from the east and the water from Rore flows out into the river Nidelva at the northern end. The 7.76-square-kilometre (3.00 sq mi) lake has an elevation of 39 metres (128 ft) above sea level.

== See also ==
- List of lakes in Aust-Agder
- List of lakes in Norway
