= Ové =

Ové is a surname. Notable people with the surname include:

- Horace Ové (1936–2023), Trinidad-born British filmmaker, photographer, painter, and writer
- Indra Ové (born 1968), British actress, daughter of Horace
- Zak Ové (born 1966), British artist, son of Horace

== See also ==
- Ove (given name)
