= Ove Pihl =

Swedish art director and book publisher (1938–2026)

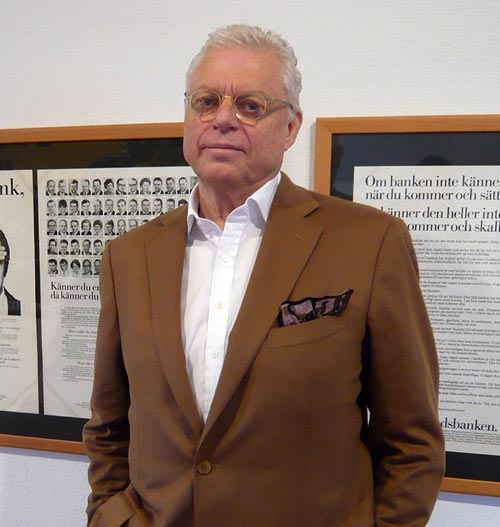
Ove Pihl

Ove Pihl (2 May 1938 – 16 March 2026) was a Swedish art director, book publisher and graphic designer. He was mostly known as founder of the advertising agency Falk & Pihl and the publishing companies Atlantis and Page One Publishing. He was also an artist with a number of exhibitions.

== Career ==
=== Early years in advertising ===
Pihl went to Enskede Läroverk school in Stockholm and received a degree from Beckman's School of Design, Stockholm, in 1959 and from School of Visual Arts, New York, in 1963. Among his teachers at SVA were the legendary graphic artists Milton Glaser, Tony Palladino and Ivan Chermayeff. In 1962, Pihl submitted pupils’ work to the exhibition ’Graphic Design USA’ in Moscow. He received his first award from the Type Directors Club in New York the same year. During his time in New York, Pihl worked as graphic designer for Lippincott & Margulies and as art director for McCann Erickson.

After returning to Stockholm, Pihl was employed by the advertising agency Ervaco Annonsbyrå, where he created the campaign for the shift to right hand traffic in Sweden, in collaboration with Björn Bunge. In 1968, he was employed by Arbmans Annonsbyrå, where he became partner in 1969. There, he created successful campaigns for, among others, Gulf, Semper AB, and the newspaper Expressen. Pihl also worked for Svenska Telegrambyrån Advertising in Stockholm.

=== Falk & Pihl ===
In 1971, Pihl founded an advertising agency in collaboration with Lars Falk, Lars Hansson, Ulf Rådegård, and Magnus Åkerlind. In 1974, Ove Pihl and Lars Falk reorganized the company into Falk & Pihl. It became one of the leading advertising agencies in Sweden, with clients such as SAAB, Ericsson, Semper, Frionor, Uplandsbanken, Pommac, SSAB, PK-Banken, Cederroths, Fiat, Mazda, the Swedish Parliament, Tor Line, A Smoke-free Generation, and Vegete. Falk & Pihl won several awards for their work. In 1983, Falk & Pihl was purchased by American advertising agency Doyle Dane Bernbach.

=== Atlantis ===
In 1974 Pihl, with Kjell Peterson, founded the book publishing company Atlantis, which became renowned for exquisitely designed non-fiction books and ambitious issues of classical literature.

=== Page One Publishing ===
In 1990, Pihl, together with Robert Malmkvist, founded the book publishing company Page One Publishing. It specialized in the creation and production of high-quality non-fiction books, approaching clients through sales channels outside of the established book market. In 1998, Page One Publishing mastered the largest Swedish book production ever in one single printing – one million bound copies - for the telecom company Telia. The book was aimed at the entire Swedish population and dealt with the new information technology. For twenty years, Page One Publishing has created and produced more than 4 million non-fiction books distributed over large parts of Europe. Among notable clients are Åhléns, IKEA, H&M, the Swedish armed forces, Indiska, Stockholm Energi, Gant, University College of Arts, Crafts and Design, Swedish Royal Court, Swedish Mail, COOP, Hemköp, Atlas Copco, Carrefour, Scania.

== Death ==
Pihl died on 16 March 2026, at the age of 87.

== Awards ==
- Type Directors Club, New York 1962
- Graphic Design USA, Moscow 1962
- Swedish Art Directors Club, numerous Golden Egg awards
- Elected to the "Advertising Hall of Fame" Platinum Academy 1986
- "Pour le Merite Gastronomique" M. Sandahl Foundation 1992
- Diploma Award - The Academy of Gastronomy 1998

== Jury work ==
- Jury on numerous occasions in the Swedish "Golden Egg" competitions 1965–1985
- Chairman of the jury of the "Golden Egg" awards 1994
- Jury "Excellent Swedish Design" 1984
- National jury Clio – awards 1983
- Jury International Posters, Berlin 1988
- Clio Executive Jury, San Francisco 1996

== Teaching ==
- Head teacher and founder of "A & O" Advertising Concept Art / Copy
- Berghs School of Advertising, Stockholm 1988–1992

== Board of directors ==
- Beckmans School of Design 1975–1980
- Berghs School of Advertising 1988–1992
- Royal Swedish College of Art 1994–1996
- Sandell Sandberg Advertising Agency 1998–2000
- Silk & Clean AB 2006–2009

== Exhibitions ==
=== Advertising ===
- Doyle Dane Bernbach "Falk & Pihl Advertising" New York 1986
- Landskrona Museum "Ove Pihl, retrospective" 2007

=== Art ===
- Pierre & Peters Interior, Stockholm 2017
- Pierre & Peters Interior, Stockholm 2016
- Galleri Sjöhästen, Nyköping 2016
- Pierre & Peters Interior, Stockholm 2015
- Stensalen, Stockholms Slott 2014
- KonstnärsBaren, Stockholm 2013
- Pierre & Peters Interior, Stockholm 2012
- Hotell Anglais, Stockholm 2011
- Galleri Sjöhästen, Nyköping 2010
- Galleri Diplomat, Stockholm 2010
- Galleri Ewerts, Nyköping 2009
- Chateau I´Arnaude, Frankrike 2008
- Galleri Roddarhuset, Vaxholm 2008
- Galleri Gummesons, Stockholm 2008
- Pontus by the Sea, Stockholm 2007
- Sturehov, Stockholm 2006
- Galleri Gummesons, Stockholm 2005
- Galleri Gummesons, Stockholm 2004
