= Brokke Hydroelectric Power Station =

Brokke Power Station
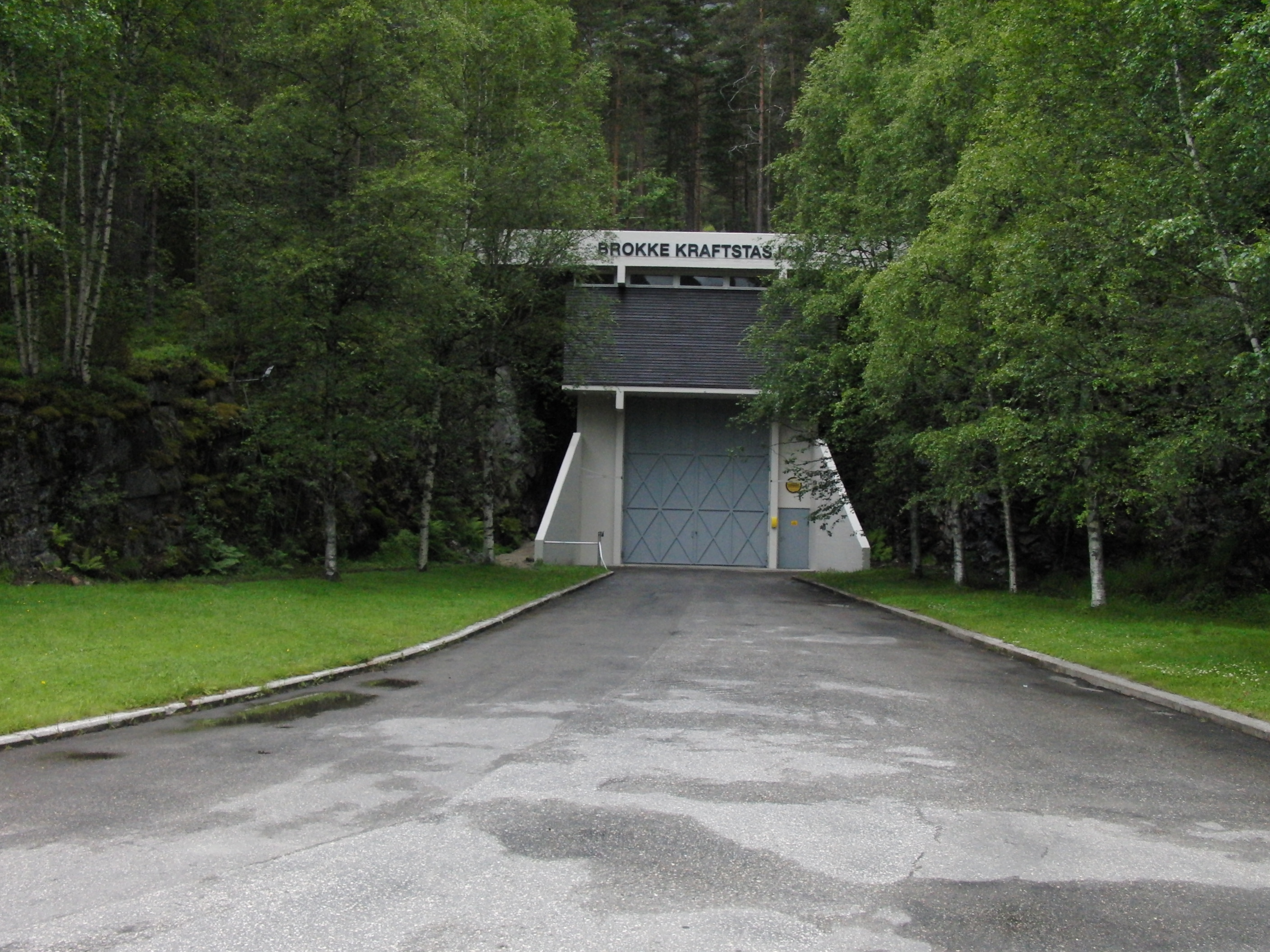
- Entrance to the Brokke Power Station
- Interactive map of Brokke Power Station
- Official name: Brokke kraftverk
- Country: Norway
- Location: Valle Municipality, Norway
- Coordinates: 59.128°N 7.514°E
- Status: In use
- Opening date: 1965; 61 years ago
- Owner: Otra Kraft

Power Station
- Hydraulic head: 303 metres (994 ft)
- Installed capacity: 330 MW
- Capacity factor: 59.8%
- Annual generation: 1,416 GW·h

The Brokke Power Station is a hydroelectric power station located in Valle Municipality in Agder county, Norway. It is located on the west shore of the river Otra, about 4 kilometres (2.5 mi) north of the village of Rysstad. The Norwegian National Road 9 runs past the station. The facility operates at an installed capacity of 330 megawatts (440,000 hp). The average annual production is 1,416 gigawatt-hours (5,100 TJ). The power station receives its water from the lake Botnsvatnet via a 30-kilometre (19 mi) long tunnel from the lake high up in the mountains. The water flowing down through the tunnel is used to produce the hydroelectric power.
