= Robert C. Rore =

German artist and illustrator (born 1954)

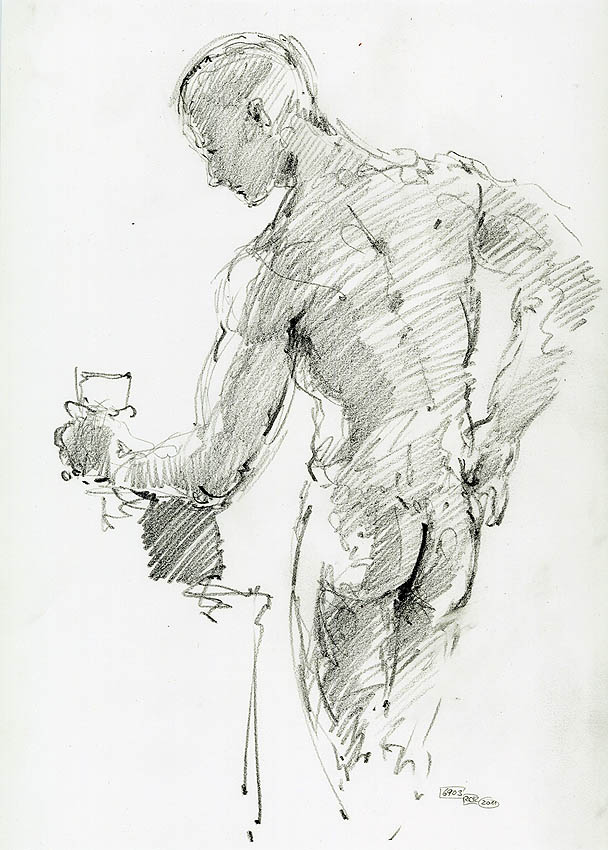
Robert C. Rore: "Back side of a man", pencil on paper, 42x33cm, 2011

Robert C. Rore (born 1954 in Berchtesgaden, Germany) is a German artist and illustrator.

== Life ==
Rore did an apprenticeship as an assistant chemist before he studied art history in Munich and was simultaneously admitted to courses in painting nudes at the Academy of Fine Arts, Munich. His first Solo exhibition was in 1982, the same year he became a professional artist. As an illustrator he works for publishers, companies and associations.

Since 1985 he teaches painting in Munich and at summer academies.

He participated in group shows at galleries, museums and Kunstvereine in Germany, Austria, the Netherlands and the USA. He had solo shows in several museums in Bavaria and is regularly shown in galleries in Munich.

== Works ==
Robert C. Rore began in 1970 with surrealistic paintings, moved to pencil and colored pencil before he developed an individual style of Etchings around 1985 that culminated in neobaroque works with surrealistic elements, in a style reminding of Juan Sánchez Cotán.

In the mid 1980s he also added hyper realistic aquarelles of still lifes and landscapes to his portfolio. For the latter he claims John Singer Sargent as model. By the late 1990s he moved to painting humans, mostly the male body. His style became impressionistic and lighter, comparable to the later works of Joaquín Sorolla. His male nudes have been described as ″body cult″ and ″erotic″ works by the Süddeutsche Zeitung.

== Publications ==
- Jutta Langreuter: An einem himmelblauen Tag in München. Eine spannende Geschichte. Illustrated by Robert C. Rore. Ars-Edition, Munich 1990, ISBN 3-7607-7649-3 (englisch edition One Fine Day in Munich. Ars-Edition, Munich 1990, ISBN 0-86724-166-7)
- Robert C. Rore: MannsBilder. Anderland, Munich 1998, ISBN 3-926220-79-1
- Robert C. Rore: Stilleben. Anderland, Munich 1999, ISBN 3-926220-86-4
- München – Ein Skizzenbuch. Aquarelle, Zeichnungen und Bildkommentare. Glaspalast-Edition, Augsburg 2004, ISBN 3-935015-00-3
- Robert C. Rore: Die Rheinreise. Ein Skizzenbuch. Aquarelle und Zeichnungen. Glaspalast-Edition, Augsburg 2006, ISBN 3-935015-01-1
- Robert C. Rore: Starnberger See-Skizzen. Bayerland, Dachau 2008, ISBN 978-3-89251-389-6
- Robert C. Rore: Carioca lury: Zeichnungen mit einem männlichen Modell / Drawings of a Male Model Glaspalast-Edition, Augsburg 2010, ISBN 978-3-935015-03-5
- Boris von Brauchitsch (author), Robert C. Rore (artist), Arnold Stadler (preface): Männerbilder / Portraits of Men Edition Braus, Berlin 2011, ISBN 978-3-86228-023-0

== Literature ==
- Robert C. Rore in: Eric Gibbons, Grady Harp: 100 artists of the male figure. Atglen, Pa. Schiffer Publishing 2011, ISBN 9780764336935

== Film portraits ==
- arte metropolis: Atelier: Die Männerbilder des Robert C. Rore, 6. Mai 2014 (German)
- Robert C Rore @ CNCPT13 - CNCPT13 gallery prinsengracht 266 Amsterdam (English)
