= Owe =

Owe is a surname or given name, a spelling variation of Ove. Notable people with the name include:

== Given name ==
- Owe Adamson (born 1935), Swedish cyclist and Olympic competitor
- Owe Hellberg (born 1953), Swedish politician
- Owe Jonsson (1940–1962), Swedish sprinter, ice hockey and bandy player
- Owe Lostad (1922–2013), Swedish rower and Olympic competitor
- Owe Nordqvist (1927–2015), Swedish cyclist and Olympic competitor
- Owe Ohlsson (born 1938), Swedish footballer and manager
- Owe Thörnqvist (born 1929), Swedish troubadour, revue artist and songwriter
- Owe Wagermark (born 1951), Swedish senior colonel
- Owe Wiktorin (born 1940), Swedish general

== Surname ==
- Baard Owe (1936–2017), Norwegian-born actor
