= Vatndalsvatnet =

Lake in Agder, Norway

- Vatnedalsvatnet
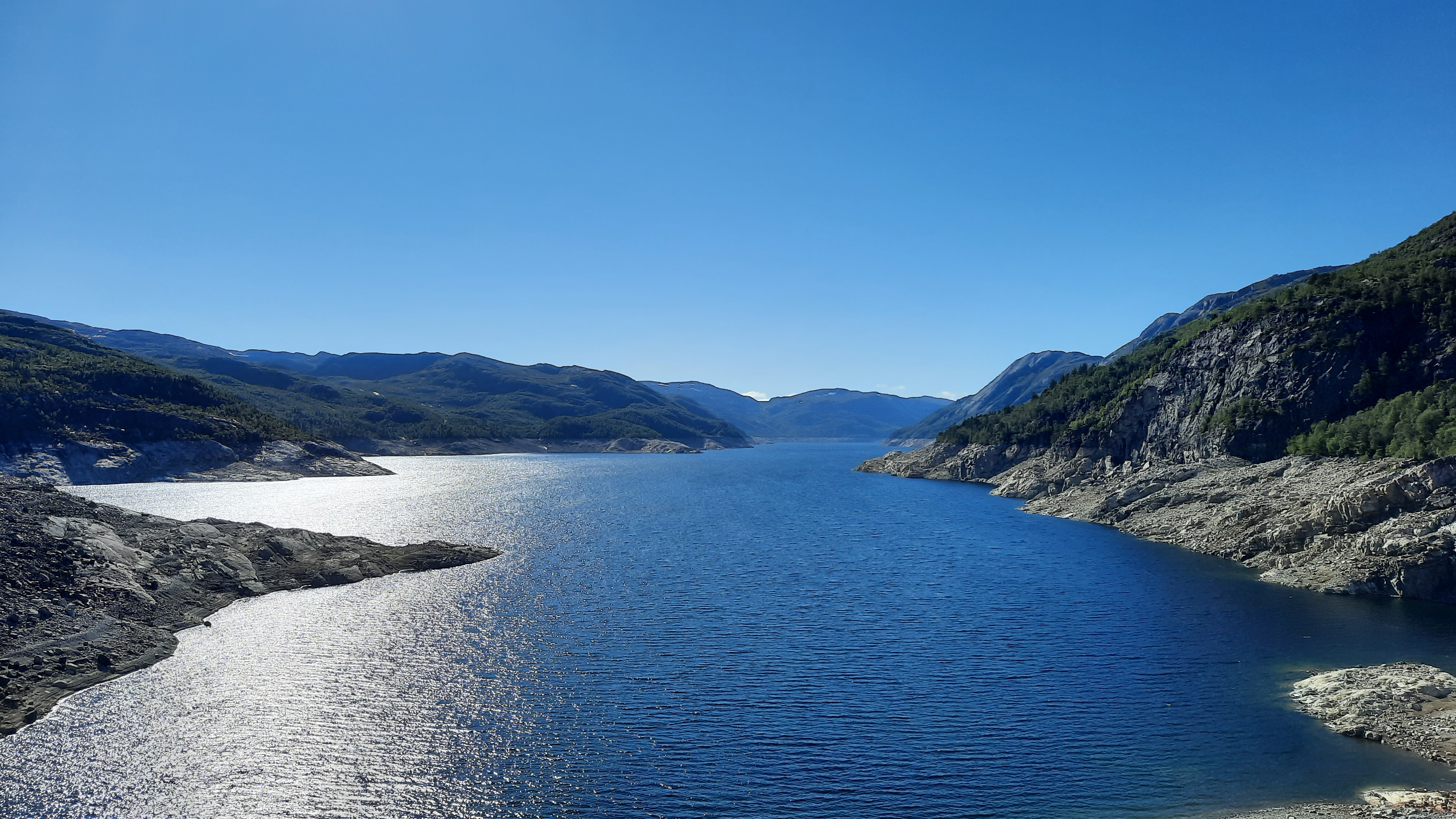
- Vatndalsvatnet seen from East standing at the Vatnedal dam
- Interactive map of Vatndalsvatnet
- Location: Bykle Municipality, Agder
- Coordinates: 59.46781°N 7.24071°E
- Primary inflows: Ormsavatnet and Store Urevatn
- Primary outflows: River Otra
- Basin countries: Norway
- Max. length: 12.9 kilometres (8.0 mi)
- Max. width: 1.4 kilometres (0.87 mi)
- Surface area: 14.42 km^{2} (5.57 sq mi)
- Shore length^{1}: 29.76 kilometres (18.49 mi)
- Surface elevation: 840 metres (2,760 ft)
- References: NVE
- ^{1} Shore length is not a well-defined measure.

Vatndalsvatnet is a lake in Bykle Municipality in Agder county, Norway. The 14.42-square-kilometre (5.57 sq mi) lake lies about 3 kilometres (1.9 mi) west of the village of Berdalen and the river Otra. The nearby lakes Ormsavatnet and Store Urevatn flow into the lake through dams and canals. The lake Vatndalsvatnet also has a dam on it and the water flows out of the lake from the dam into the Otra river. It is located in the central part of Bykle, about halfway between the villages of Hovden and Bykle. The mountains Snjoheinuten and Kvervetjønnuten both lie on the south side of the lake.

== See also ==
- List of lakes in Aust-Agder
- List of lakes in Norway
