= Store Urevatn =

Lake in Agder, Norway

- Urevatn
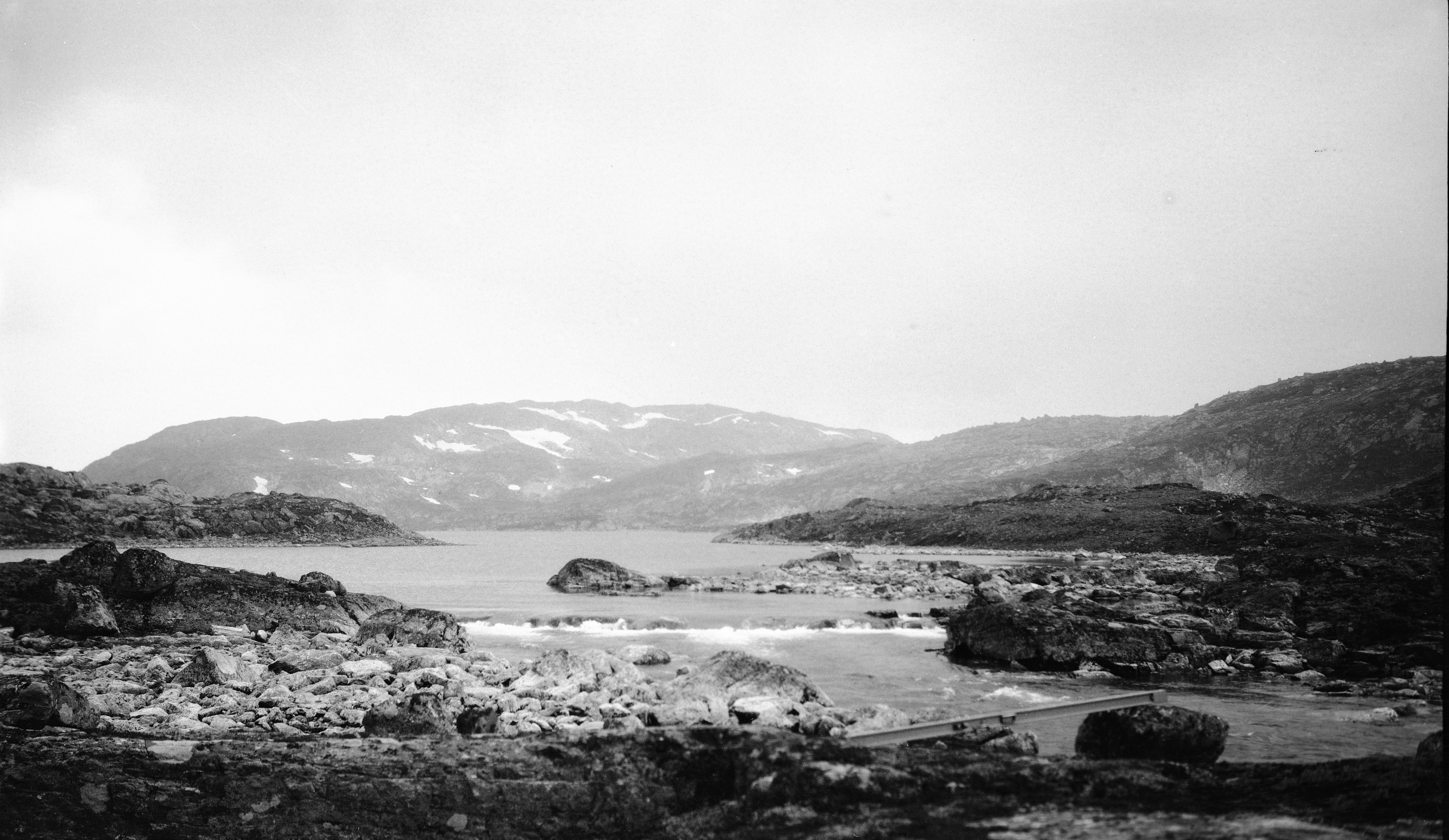
- Interactive map of Store Urevatn
- Location: Bykle Municipality, Agder
- Coordinates: 59.44858°N 7.11929°E
- Primary outflows: Vatndalsvatnet
- Basin countries: Norway
- Max. length: 7.9 kilometres (4.9 mi)
- Max. width: 9.3 kilometres (5.8 mi)
- Surface area: 14.61 km^{2} (5.64 sq mi)
- Shore length^{1}: 46.35 kilometres (28.80 mi)
- Surface elevation: 1,164 metres (3,819 ft)
- References: NVE
- ^{1} Shore length is not a well-defined measure.

Store Urevatn is a lake in Bykle Municipality in Agder county, Norway. The 14.61-square-kilometre (5.64 sq mi) lake lies about 13 kilometres (8.1 mi) west of the village of Hoslemo and about 15 kilometres (9.3 mi) northwest of the village of Bykle. The lake sits at an elevation of 1,164 metres (3,819 ft) above sea level, high up in the Setesdalsheiene mountains, just north of the mountains Urevassnutene and Djuptjønnuten and just west of Snjoheinuten.

The northeastern arm of the lake has a dam on it which leads to a canal that brings the out-flowing water to the nearby lake Vatndalsvatnet.

The lake has large populations of brook trout and brown trout, which makes it a popular fishing location.

== See also ==
- List of lakes in Aust-Agder
- List of lakes in Norway
