= Ove Dalsheim =

Norwegian trade unionist and politician

Ove Dalsheim (born 12 May 1944) is a Norwegian trade unionist and politician.

He started his career in the Norwegian State Railways in 1961, and held his first post in the Norwegian Union of Railway Workers in 1967. In October 1992 he succeeded Leif Thue as the union leader. He had already been a board member of the Norwegian State Railways, representing the railway employees together with Leif Thue. He worked as a yard controller by the time he became union leader. He withdrew in 2004, being succeeded by Kjell Atle Brunborg.

He was also a member of the Labour Party, and served four terms in Trondheim city council. Before joining the Labour Party he was a prominent local member of the Communist Party of Norway. He was also a board member of Trondheim Trafikkselskap, at the time when the board decided upon the closing of the Trondheim Tramway.
