= Stig Ove Sandnes =

Norwegian sports official (born 1970)

Stig-Ove Sandnes (born 25 January 1970) is a Norwegian sports official.

He is from Åndalsnes, and was hired in Football Association of Norway in 1995. This is the largest sports federation in Norway. From 2008 to 2009 he was the assisting secretary-general. In early 2010 he was hired as managing director in top-tier football club Tromsø IL.
