= Åraksfjorden =

Lake in Agder, Norway

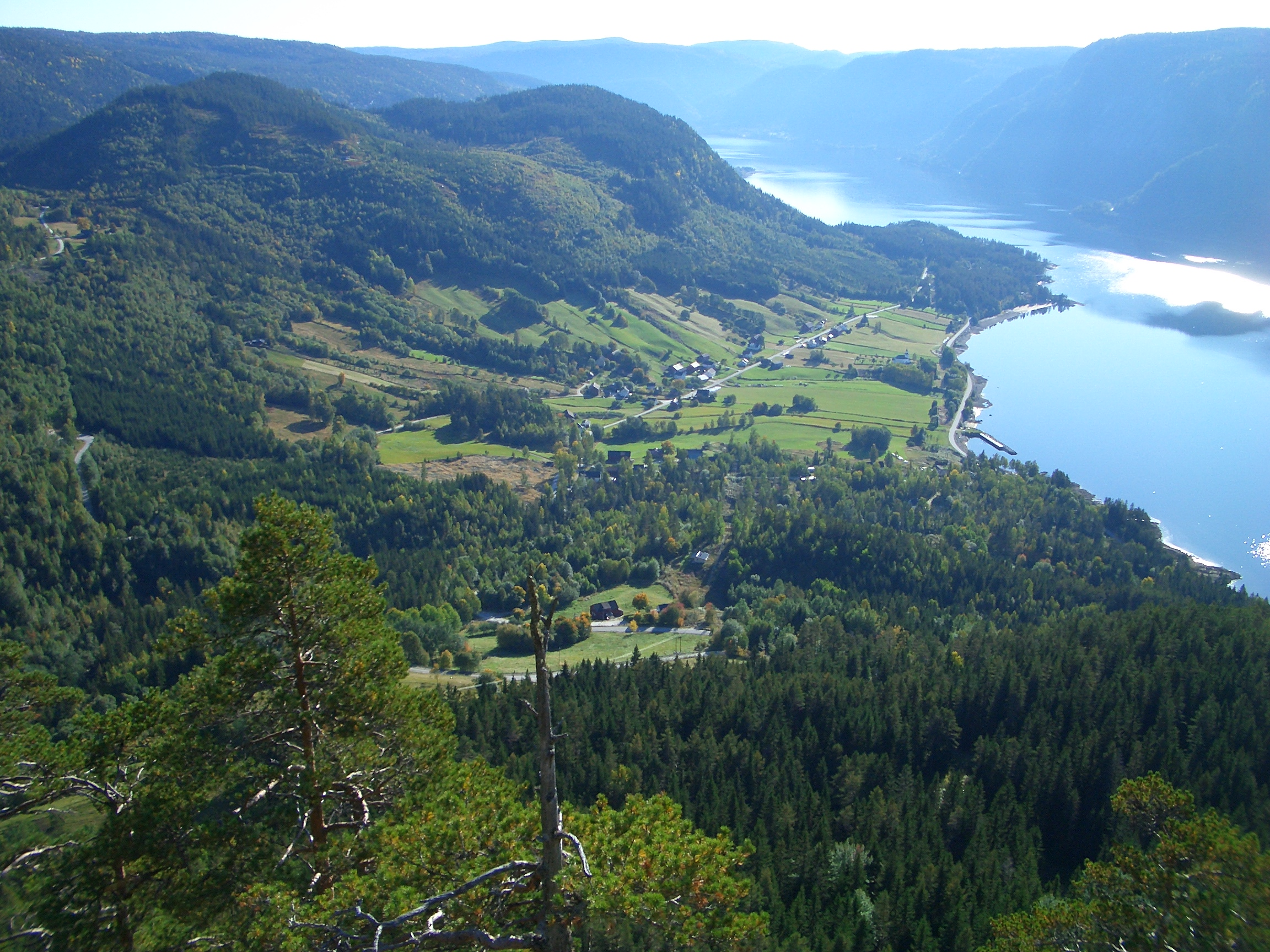
- View of the lake at Åraksbø
- Interactive map of Åraksfjorden
- Location: Bygland Municipality, Agder
- Coordinates: 58.9302°N 07.7056°E
- Primary inflows: Otra river
- Primary outflows: Byglandsfjorden
- Catchment area: Otra watershed
- Basin countries: Norway
- Max. length: 32 kilometres (20 mi)
- Max. width: 0.6 to 1.5 km (0.37 to 0.93 mi)
- Surface area: 11.96 km^{2} (4.62 sq mi)
- Average depth: 35 metres (115 ft)
- Max. depth: 89 metres (292 ft)
- Water volume: 212.3 Mm^{3} (7.50×10^{21} cu ft)
- Shore length^{1}: 45.22 kilometres (28.10 mi)
- Surface elevation: 203 metres (666 ft)
- Settlements: Åraksbø
- References: NVE
- ^{1} Shore length is not a well-defined measure.

Åraksfjorden is a lake in Bygland Municipality in Agder county, Norway. The 11.96-square-kilometre (4.62 sq mi) lake is part of the Otra drainage basin. The northern part of the lake is fed directly by the river Otra. The southern part of the lake goes through a narrow channel which leads into the Byglandsfjorden. The villages of Frøysnes and Skåmedal are located along the western side of the lake and on the eastern side are the villages of Sandnes and Åraksbø. The Norwegian National Road 9 runs along the eastern side of the lake.

The name of the 32-kilometre (20 mi) long lake was given because it is located near the village of Åraksbø. The central part of the lake is also called the Sandnesfjord and the southern part is also called the Blåfjord.

== See also ==
- List of lakes in Aust-Agder
- List of lakes in Norway
