= Hornnes Municipality =

Former municipality in Aust-Agder, Norway

Hornnes Municipality Hornnes herad
- Former municipality
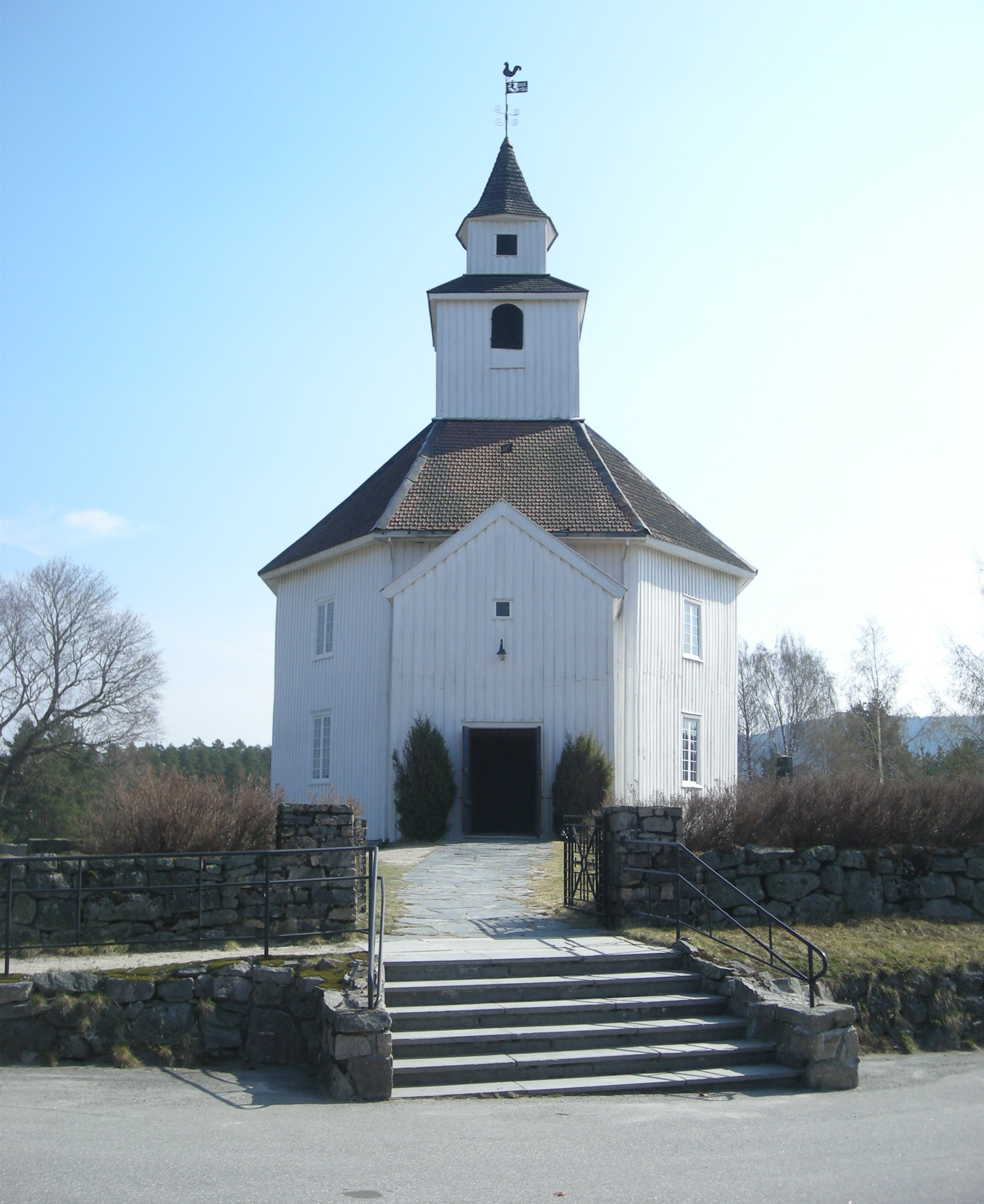
- View of the local church, Hornnes Church

- Aust-Agder within Norway

- Hornnes within Aust-Agder
- Coordinates: 58°33′16″N 07°46′23″E
- Country: Norway
- County: Aust-Agder
- District: Setesdal
- Established: 1 Jan 1886
  - Preceded by: Hornnes og Iveland Municipality
- Disestablished: 1 Jan 1960
  - Succeeded by: Evje og Hornnes Municipality
- Administrative centre: Hornnes

Government
  - Mayor (1947-1959): Olav A. Fennefoss

Area (upon dissolution)
  - Total: 381 km^{2} (147 sq mi)
  - Rank: #237 in Norway
- Highest elevation: 789.88 m (2,591.5 ft)

Population (1959)
  - Total: 1,282
  - Rank: #601 in Norway
  - Density: 3.4/km^{2} (8.8/sq mi)
  - Change (10 years): ▼ −5%
- Demonym: Horndøl

Official language
  - Norwegian form: Nynorsk
- Time zone: UTC+01:00 (CET)
  - Summer (DST): UTC+02:00 (CEST)
- ISO 3166 code: NO-0936

Hornnes is a former municipality in the old Aust-Agder county, Norway. The 381-square-kilometre (147 sq mi) municipality existed from 1886 until its dissolution in 1960. The area is now part of Evje og Hornnes Municipality in the traditional district of Setesdal in Agder county. The administrative centre was the village of Hornnes where Hornnes Church is located. Other villages in the municipality included Dåsnesmoen, Kjetså, Moi, and Øvre Dåsvatn.

Prior to its dissolution in 1960, the 381-square-kilometre (147 sq mi) municipality was the 237th largest by area out of the 743 municipalities in Norway. Hornnes Municipality was the 601st most populous municipality in Norway with a population of about 1,282. The municipality's population density was 3.4 inhabitants per square kilometre (8.8/sq mi) and its population had decreased by 5% over the previous 10-year period.

== General information ==
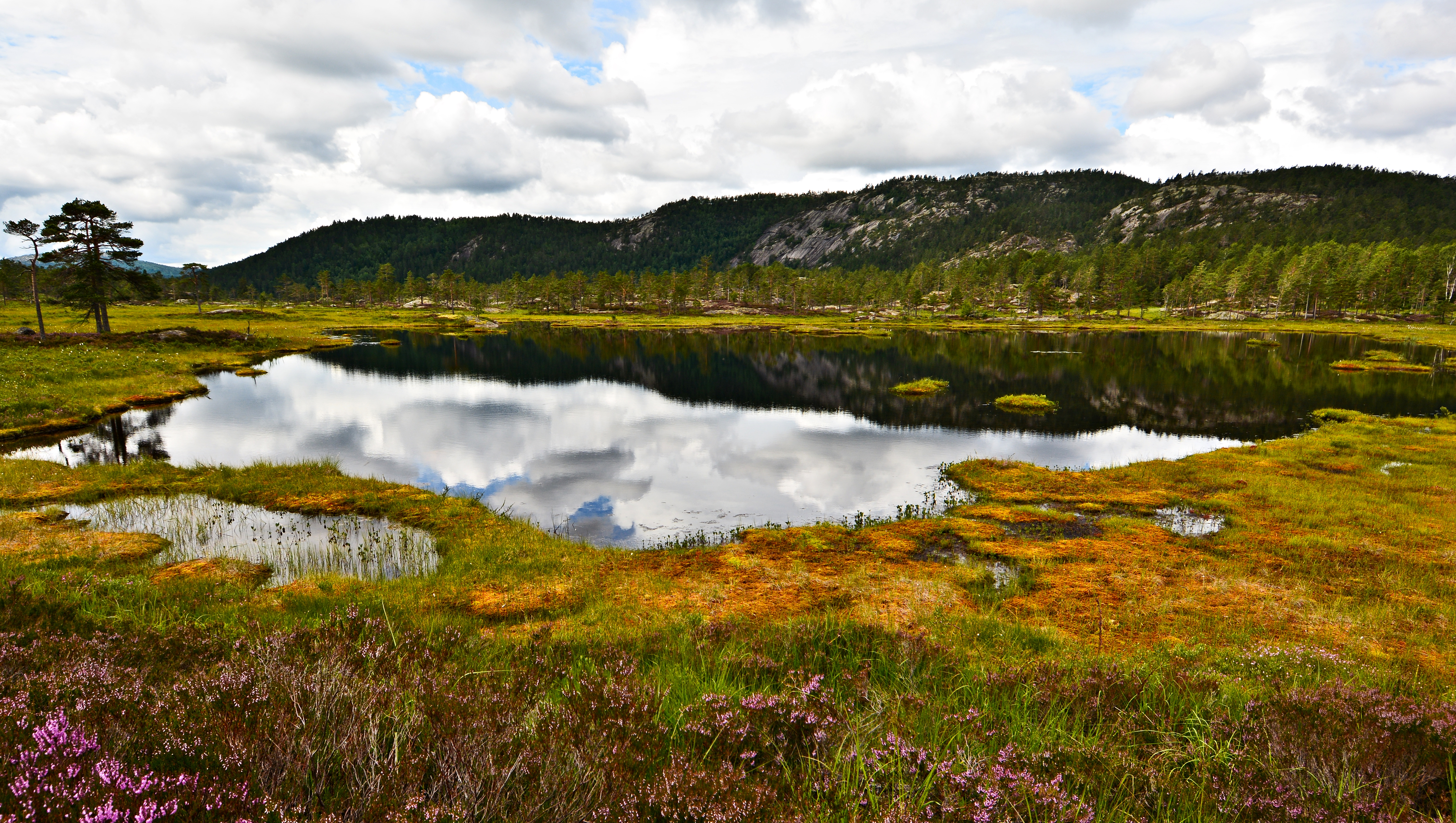
View of the natural landscape of Hornnes municipality

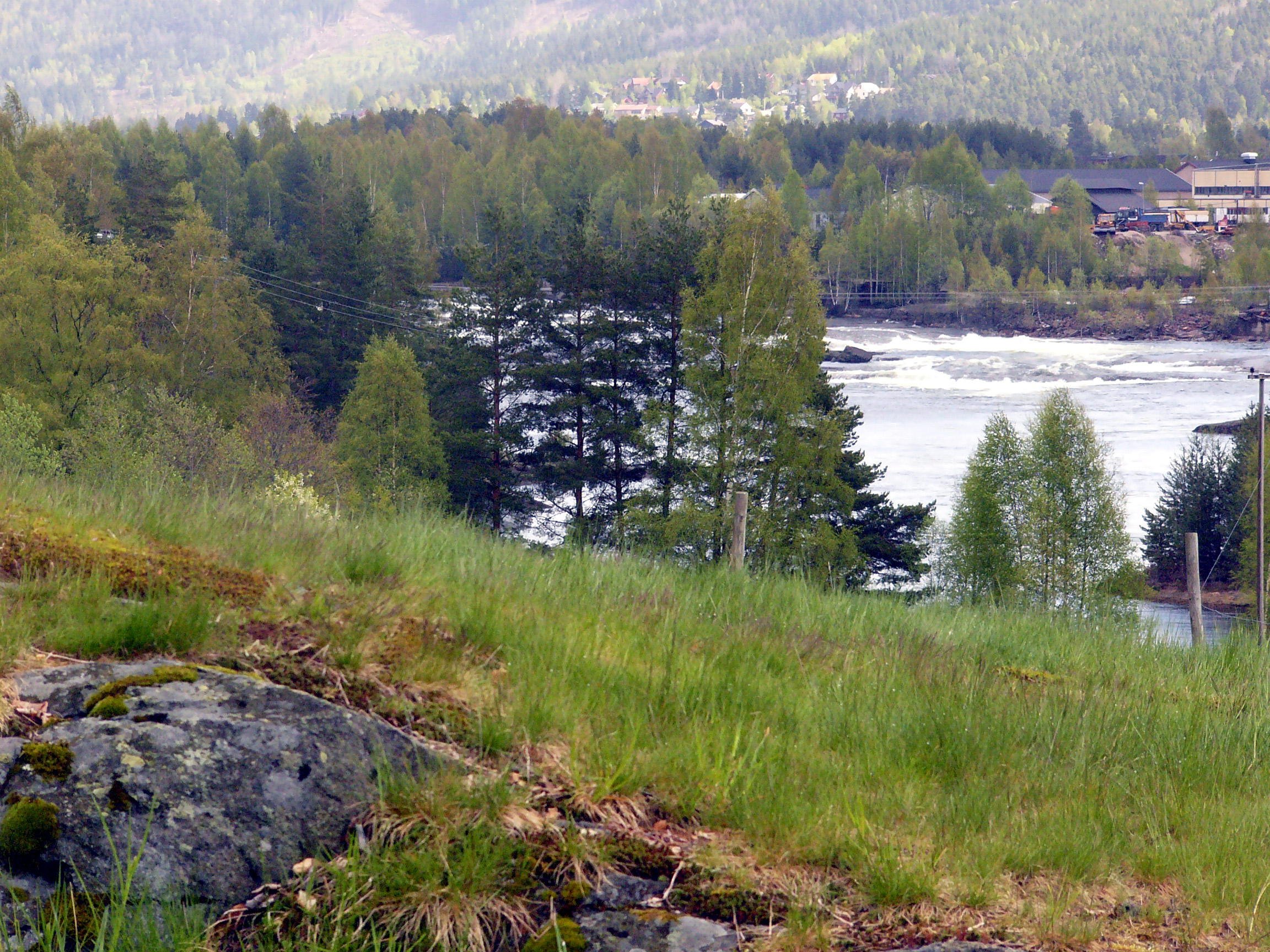
View of the Fennefoss area in Hornnes municipality

The municipality of Hornnes was established on 1 January 1886 when the old Hornnes og Iveland Municipality was divided into two separate municipalities: the northern district (population: 1,113) became the new Hornnes Municipality and the southern district (population: 1,103) became the new Iveland Municipality.

During the 1960s, there were many municipal mergers across Norway due to the work of the Schei Committee. On 1 January 1960, Evje Municipality (population: 1,646) was merged with the neighboring Hornnes Municipality (population: 1,280) to form the new Evje og Hornnes Municipality.

=== Name ===
The municipality (originally the parish) is named after the old Hornnes farm (Old Norse: Hornnes) since the first Hornnes Church was built there. The first element is horn which means "horn". The last element is nes which means "headland". So the meaning of Hornnes is "the headland shaped like a horn". This is likely referring to the two horn-shaped peninsulas that jut out into the river Otra at the entrance to the lake Breidflå. Historically, the name was spelled Hordnæs.

=== Churches ===
The Church of Norway had one parish (sokn) within Hornnes Municipality. At the time of the municipal dissolution, it was part of the Evje prestegjeld and the Otredal prosti (deanery) in the Diocese of Agder.

Churches in Hornnes Municipality
| Parish (sokn) | Church name | Location of the church | Year built |
|---|---|---|---|
| Hornnes | Hornnes Church | Hornnes | 1828 |

== Geography ==
The highest point in the municipality was the 789.88-metre (2,591.5 ft) tall mountain Midtstrandnuten, located on the border with Åseral Municipality. Bygland Municipality was located to the north, Evje Municipality was located to the east, Iveland Municipality was located to the southeast, Hægeland Municipality and Bjelland Municipality were located to the south (both in Vest-Agder county), Grindheim Municipality was located to the southwest (in Vest-Agder county), and Åseral Municipality was located to the west (in Vest-Agder county).

== Government ==
While it existed, Hornnes Municipality was responsible for primary education (through 10th grade), outpatient health services, senior citizen services, welfare and other social services, zoning, economic development, and municipal roads and utilities. The municipality was governed by a municipal council of directly elected representatives. The mayor was indirectly elected by a vote of the municipal council. The municipality was under the jurisdiction of the Setesdal District Court and the Agder Court of Appeal.

=== Municipal council ===
The municipal council (Herredsstyre) of Hornnes Municipality was made up of 21 representatives that were elected to four year terms. The tables below show the historical composition of the council by political party.

Hornnes herredsstyre 1956–1959
| Party name (in Norwegian) | Number of representatives |
|---|---|
| Labour Party (Arbeiderpartiet) | 10 |
| Farmers' Party (Bondepartiet) | 5 |
| Liberal Party (Venstre) | 6 |
| Total number of members: | 21 |
Note: On 1 January 1960, Hornnes Municipality became part of Evje og Hornnes Municipality.

Hornnes heradsstyre 1952–1955
| Party name (in Nynorsk) | Number of representatives |
|---|---|
| Labour Party (Arbeidarpartiet) | 9 |
| Farmers' Party (Bondepartiet) | 5 |
| Liberal Party (Venstre) | 6 |
| Total number of members: | 20 |

Hornnes heradsstyre 1948–1951
| Party name (in Nynorsk) | Number of representatives |
|---|---|
| Labour Party (Arbeidarpartiet) | 8 |
| Communist Party (Kommunistiske Parti) | 1 |
| Joint List(s) of Non-Socialist Parties (Borgarlege Felleslister) | 11 |
| Total number of members: | 20 |

Hornnes heradsstyre 1945–1947
| Party name (in Nynorsk) | Number of representatives |
|---|---|
| Labour Party (Arbeidarpartiet) | 9 |
| Communist Party (Kommunistiske Parti) | 2 |
| Farmers' Party (Bondepartiet) | 4 |
| Joint list of the Liberal Party (Venstre) and the Radical People's Party (Radikale Folkepartiet) | 5 |
| Total number of members: | 20 |

Hornnes heradsstyre 1938–1941*
| Party name (in Nynorsk) | Number of representatives |
|---|---|
| Labour Party (Arbeidarpartiet) | 9 |
| Farmers' Party (Bondepartiet) | 4 |
| Liberal Party (Venstre) | 5 |
| Joint List(s) of Non-Socialist Parties (Borgarlege Felleslister) | 2 |
| Total number of members: | 20 |
Note: Due to the German occupation of Norway during World War II, no elections were held for new municipal councils until after the war ended in 1945.

=== Mayors ===
The mayor (Nynorsk: ordførar) of Hornnes Municipality was the political leader of the municipality and the chairperson of the municipal council. The following people have held this position:

- 1886–1895: Ola Hanssen Uleberg
- 1895–1902: Olaf Kallhovd
- 1902–1907: Alf Ketilsaa
- 1907–1913: Olaf Kallhovd
- 1914–1916: Torgeir G. Abusdal
- 1917–1919: Arnt Larsen
- 1919–1934: Torgeir G. Abusdal
- 1934–1940: Axel Sigfred Leween
- 1945–1947: Gunnar Uleberg
- 1947–1959: Olav A. Fennefoss

== Attractions ==
=== Hornnes Church ===
Hornnes Church is an octagonal building that was constructed in 1828. Historical records show that there was a church in Hornnes as far back as 1327. There are also records in Rome referring to "Ornes i Odralen" (Hornnes Church is part of the Otredal prosti).

=== Mining ===
Mining is prevalent throughout the region, and Hornnes is home to the Hornnes Mineralparken. Visitors can tour a mine and learn about the minerals such as quartz and feldspar that are mined there.

== Notable people ==
- Hartvig Caspar Christie (1893-1959), a Norwegian politician
- Torleiv Hannaas (1874-1929), a philologist who was chairman of Noregs Mållag
- Geir Kjetsaa (1937-2008), a professor

== See also ==
- List of former municipalities of Norway
