= Hornnes =

Hornnes may refer to:

== Places ==
- Hornnes (village), a village in Evje og Hornnes Municipality in Agder county, Norway
- Hornnes Municipality, a former municipality in the old Aust-Agder county, Norway
- Hornnes Church, a church in Evje og Hornnes Municipality in Agder county, Norway
- Hornnes Upper Secondary School, an upper secondary school in Hornnes, Norway

== See also ==
- Evje og Hornnes Municipality
- Hornnes og Iveland Municipality
