= Evjemoen =

Former military site in Agder county, Norway

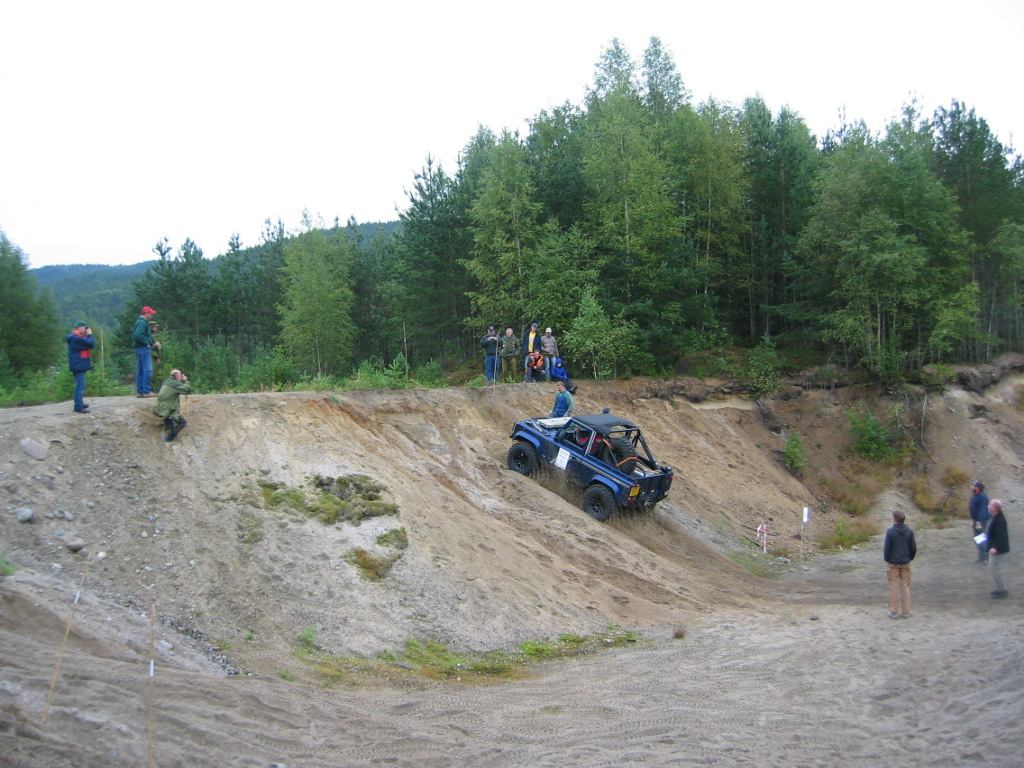
- Interactive map of Evjemoen
- Coordinates: 58.56667°N 7.78333°E
- Country: Norway
- Region: Southern Norway
- County: Agder
- District: Setesdal
- Municipality: Evje og Hornnes Municipality
- Elevation: 179 m (587 ft)
- Time zone: UTC+01:00 (CET)
  - Summer (DST): UTC+02:00 (CEST)

Evjemoen was a Norwegian military camp in use from 1912 to 2002. The camp was located south of the village of Evje and northeast of the village of Hornnes in Evje og Hornnes Municipality in Agder county. The 800-decare (200-acre) camp was in use from 1912 until its retirement in December 2002. Evjemoen lies in the Setesdal valley about 60 kilometres (37 mi) north of Kristiansand, on the flat plain at the east side of Otra river.

After the camp was closed in 2002 the area was redeveloped for civilian use. Evje og Hornnes Municipality purchased it from the Armed Forces in 2003 and developed the camp area as the new Evjemoen business park. The municipal offices are now located in the former camp buildings. Plus a low-security women's branch of the Agder Prison was moved onto the site as well. The Evjemoen Defence Museum was opened in 2006 on the site (it is part of the Setesdal Museum network.

The Evjemoen SØF (shooting and training range) is still located east of the old Evjemoen camp, and the military still utilizes that area which includes a 7,360-decare (7.36 km^{2}; 2.84 sq mi) shooting range plus an additional 23,500-decare (23.5 km^{2}; 9.1 sq mi) exercise and maneuvering area.

== History ==
Evjemoen was established in 1912 for the Rogaland Infantry Regiment (IR8) during the First World War. During the 1920s and 1930s, the camp was used by the Agdesiden Infantry Regiment, by the 1st Mountain Artillery Battalion, and by some smaller special units. During the Second World War, the Germans bombed the camp and then later occupied and enlarged the camp.

After the war from 1953 to 1995, Evjemoen was used as a training area for the Infantry Training Division II (IØ2). In 1995, the IØ2 was closed down. After that, Evjemoen served as a Norwegian military camp and a boot camp for the Agder Regiment infantry until the closure in 2002.

== Timeline ==
- 1912–1918: Evjemoen established. It was tied to the Setesdal Line for rail service.
- 1921–1939: Evjemoen was used as a training and drill center.
- 1940–1945: The Germans occupied and expanded the camp using Russian prisoners of war. The Russians were quartered in the original Norwegian camp.
- 1953–1995, Evjemoen was used as a training area for the Infantry Training Division II (IØ2)
- 1995–2002, Evjemoen was used as the boot camp and training site for the Agder Regiment
- 2002: camp closed.

== Notable people ==
In 1979-1980, the future Norwegian prime minister and Secretary General of NATO, Jens Stoltenberg served his military conscription at Evjemoen.
