= Flatebygd =

Village in Evje og Hornnes Municipality, Norway

- Village
- Interactive map of Flatebygd
- Coordinates: 58.6061°N 07.8787°E
- Country: Norway
- Region: Southern Norway
- County: Agder
- District: Setesdal
- Municipality: Evje og Hornnes Municipality
- Elevation: 368 m (1,207 ft)
- Time zone: UTC+01:00 (CET)
  - Summer (DST): UTC+02:00 (CEST)
- Post Code: 4735 Evje

Flatebygd is a village in Evje og Hornnes Municipality in Agder county, Norway. The village is located about 3.5 kilometres (2.2 mi) northeast of the village of Evje and about 3 kilometres (1.9 mi) north of the village of Åneland. The lake Høvringsvatnet and the village of Gautestad both lie about 5 kilometres (3.1 mi) to the northeast of the village.
