= Hornnes og Iveland Municipality =

Former municipality in Aust-Agder, Norway

Hornnes og Iveland Municipality Hornnes og Iveland herred
- Former municipality
- Aust-Agder within Norway

- Hornnes og Iveland within Aust-Agder
- Coordinates: 58°33′33″N 07°46′24″E
- Country: Norway
- County: Aust-Agder
- District: Setesdal
- Established: 1 Jan 1838
  - Created as: Formannskapsdistrikt
- Disestablished: 1 Jan 1886
  - Succeeded by: Hornnes Municipality and Iveland Municipality
- Administrative centre: Hornnes

Government
  - Mayor (1882–1885): Tellef Tellefsen Frøysaa

Area
  - Total: 640 km^{2} (250 sq mi)
- Highest elevation: 789.88 m (2,591.5 ft)

Population (1886)
  - Total: 2,216
  - Density: 3.5/km^{2} (9.0/sq mi)
- Demonym(s): Horndøl; Ivelending
- Time zone: UTC+01:00 (CET)
  - Summer (DST): UTC+02:00 (CEST)
- ISO 3166 code: NO-0935

Hornnes og Iveland is a former municipality in the old Vest-Agder county, Norway. The 640-square-kilometre (250 sq mi) municipality existed from 1838 until its dissolution in 1886. The area is now divided between Iveland Municipality and Evje og Hornnes Municipality in the traditional district of Setesdal in Agder county. The administrative centre was the village of Hornnes where the Hornnes Church is located. The other church in the municipality was the Iveland Church in the village of Birketveit.

== General information ==
The parish of Hordnæs og Iveland (later spelled Hornnes og Iveland) was established as a municipality on 1 January 1838 (see formannskapsdistrikt law). According to the 1835 census, the municipality had a population of 1,848. On 1 January 1886, Hornnes og Iveland Municipaliyt was divided to create two separate municipalities: the northern district (population: 1,113) became the new Hornnes Municipality and the southern district (population: 1,103) became the new Iveland Municipality. Iveland Municipality still exists today, while Hornnes currently a part of Evje og Hornnes Municipality.

=== Name ===
The two neighboring parishes of Hornnes and Iveland were put together as a single municipality after the formannskapsdistrikt law went into effect on 1 January 1838. The resulting municipality was given the compound name Hornnes og Iveland, literally meaning "Hornnes and Iveland".

The historic parish of Hornnes is named after the old Hornnes farm (Old Norse: Hornnes) since the first Hornnes Church was built there. The first element is horn which means "horn". The last element is nes which means "headland". So the meaning of Hornnes is "the headland shaped like a horn". This is likely referring to the two horn-shaped peninsulas that jut out into the river Otra at the entrance to the lake Breidflå.

The historic parish of Iveland is named after the old Iveland farm (Old Norse: Ífuland) since the first Iveland Church was built there. This old farm is now part of the village of Birketveit. The first element is the genitive case of the local river name Ífa which now called the Frøysåna. The river name is probably derived from the word ýr which means "yew" (Taxus baccata). The last element is land which means "land" or "district".

=== Churches ===
The Church of Norway had one parish (sokn) within Hornnes og Iveland Municipality. At the time of the municipal dissolution, it was part of the Evje prestegjeld and the Otredal prosti (deanery) in the Diocese of Agder.

Churches in Hornnes og Iveland Municipality
Parish (sokn)	Church name	Location of the church	Year built
Hornnes	Hornnes Church	Hornnes	1828
Hornnes	Iveland Church	Birketveit	1837

== Geography ==
The municipality was located along the river Otra in the southern part of the Setesdal valley. The highest point in the municipality was the 789.88-metre (2,591.5 ft) tall mountain Midtstrandnuten, located on the border with Åseral Municipality. Bygland Municipality was located to the north, Evje Municipality was located to the northeast, Vegusdal Municipality was located to the east, Birkenes Municipality (in Nedenes county) and Vennesla Municipality (in Lister og Mandal county) were located to the southeast, Hægeland Municipality (in Lister og Mandal county) was located to the south, Bjelland og Grindum Municipality (in Lister og Mandal county) was located to the southwest, and Åseral Municipality (in Lister og Mandal county) was located to the west.

== Government ==
While it existed, Hornnes og Iveland Municipality was governed by a municipal council of directly elected representatives. The mayor was indirectly elected by a vote of the municipal council. The municipality was under the jurisdiction of the Setesdal District Court and the Agder Court of Appeal.

=== Mayors ===
The mayor (Norwegian: ordfører) of Hornnes og Iveland Municipality was the political leader of the municipality and the chairperson of the municipal council. The following people have held this position:

- 1838–1839: Tellef Christensen Fjellestad
- 1839–1842: Thomas Sørensen Hodne
- 1842–1843: Salve Baardsen Mjaaland
- 1843–1849: Torje Jensen Aas Kjetsaa
- 1849–1851: Christen Andersen Skaiaa
- 1851–1857: Torje Jensen Aas Kjetsaa
- 1858–1863: Christen Thorkildsen Nateland
- 1863–1865: Thomas Sørensen Hodne
- 1866–1869: Christen Thorkildsen Nateland
- 1869–1871: Thomas Sørensen Hodne
- 1871–1873: Torje Jensen Aas Kjetsaa
- 1873–1877: Mads Gundersen Faret
- 1878–1879: Tellef Salvesen Eieland
- 1879–1881: John N. Hornnes
- 1882–1885: Tellef Tellefsen Frøysaa

== See also ==
- List of former municipalities of Norway
