= Gautestad =

Village in Evje og Hornnes Municipality, Norway

- Village
- Interactive map of Gautestad
- Coordinates: 58.6517°N 07.9533°E
- Country: Norway
- Region: Southern Norway
- County: Agder
- District: Setesdal
- Municipality: Evje og Hornnes Municipality
- Elevation: 540 m (1,770 ft)
- Time zone: UTC+01:00 (CET)
  - Summer (DST): UTC+02:00 (CEST)
- Post Code: 4735 Evje

Gautestad is a village in Evje og Hornnes Municipality in Agder county, Norway. The village is located on the northeastern shore of the lake Høvringsvatnet, about 12 kilometres (7.5 mi) northeast of the villages of Evje and Flatebygd.
