= Øvre Dåsvatn =

Village in Evje og Hornnes Municipality, Norway

- Village
- Interactive map of Øvre Dåsvatn
- Coordinates: 58.6448°N 07.6117°E
- Country: Norway
- Region: Southern Norway
- County: Agder
- District: Setesdal
- Municipality: Evje og Hornnes Municipality
- Elevation: 195 m (640 ft)
- Time zone: UTC+01:00 (CET)
  - Summer (DST): UTC+02:00 (CEST)
- Post Code: 4737 Hornnes

Øvre Dåsvatn is a village in Evje og Hornnes Municipality in Agder county, Norway. The village is located in the Dåsvannsdalen valley, about 14 kilometres (8.7 mi) northwest of the villages of Hornnes, Kjetså, and Dåsnesmoen. The village of Lognevatn in neighboring Åseral Municipality lies about 13 kilometres (8.1 mi) to the northwest of Øvre Dåsvatn. The picturesque lake Dåsvatn lies to the south of the village, surrounded by forest.
