= Åneland =

Village in Evje og Hornnes Municipality, Norway

- Village
- Interactive map of Åneland
- Coordinates: 58.5804°N 07.8618°E
- Country: Norway
- Region: Southern Norway
- County: Agder
- District: Setesdal
- Municipality: Evje og Hornnes Municipality
- Elevation: 326 m (1,070 ft)
- Time zone: UTC+01:00 (CET)
  - Summer (DST): UTC+02:00 (CEST)
- Post Code: 4735 Evje

Åneland is a small village in Evje og Hornnes Municipality in Agder county, Norway. The village is located about 4 kilometres (2.5 mi) east of the village of Evje and about 3 kilometres (1.9 mi) south of the village of Flatebygd.
