= Moi, Evje og Hornnes =

Village in Evje og Hornnes Municipality, Norway

Moi
- Village
- Interactive map of Moi
- Coordinates: 58.50682°N 7.76888°E
- Country: Norway
- Region: Southern Norway
- County: Agder
- District: Setesdal
- Municipality: Evje og Hornnes Municipality
- Elevation: 175 m (574 ft)
- Time zone: UTC+01:00 (CET)
  - Summer (DST): UTC+02:00 (CEST)
- Post Code: 4737 Hornnes

Moi is a village in Evje og Hornnes Municipality in Agder county, Norway. The village is located on the west shore of the river Otra, about 5 kilometres (3.1 mi) south of the villages of Hornnes and Kjetså and about 14 kilometres (8.7 mi) north of the village of Hægeland in the neighboring Vennesla Municipality. Norwegian National Road 9 runs through the village.
