= Dåsnesmoen =

Village in Evje og Hornnes Municipality, Norway

Dåsnesmoen Dåsnesmonen
- Village
- Interactive map of Dåsnesmoen
- Coordinates: 58.5703°N 07.7710°E
- Country: Norway
- Region: Southern Norway
- County: Agder
- District: Setesdal
- Municipality: Evje og Hornnes Municipality
- Elevation: 181 m (594 ft)
- Time zone: UTC+01:00 (CET)
  - Summer (DST): UTC+02:00 (CEST)
- Post Code: 4737 Hornnes

Dåsnesmoen is a village in Evje og Hornnes Municipality in Agder county, Norway. The village is located on the west shore of the river Otra, north of the villages of Hornnes and Kjetså and southwest of the village of Evje. The Norwegian National Road 9 runs through the village.
