= Setesdølen =

Norwegian newspaper

Setesdølen is a Norwegian newspaper based in Bygland and covering the news from the whole Setesdal valley which includes the following municipalities: Valle, Bykle, Bygland, and Evje og Hornnes. A paper version of the newspaper is published twice a week and news is updated daily on their website.

The newspaper was established on 23 January 1975 by Helge Lien from Kristiansand. The first editor was Helge Arild Bolstad.
