= Bjåen =

Village in Bykle Municipality, Norway

Bjåen Bjåi
- Village
- Interactive map of Bjåen
- Coordinates: 59.63992°N 7.43989°E
- Country: Norway
- Region: Southern Norway
- County: Agder
- District: Setesdal
- Municipality: Bykle Municipality
- Elevation: 917 m (3,009 ft)
- Time zone: UTC+01:00 (CET)
  - Summer (DST): UTC+02:00 (CEST)
- Post Code: 4755 Hovden i Setesdal

Bjåen or Bjåi is a small village in Bykle Municipality in Agder county, Norway. The village is located along the Norwegian National Road 9 (the road may be closed in winter, due to heavy snow and bad weather). The village sits on the north shore of the lake Breidvatn, about 12 kilometres (7.5 mi) north of the village of Hovden and about 15 kilometres (9.3 mi) south of Haukeli in neighboring Vinje Municipality in Telemark county to the north. The area is primarily agricultural, specializing in sheep herding rather than growing crops, but Bjåen is probably best known for the Bjåen tourist lodge in the high mountain area.
