= Erik Gunnes =

Norwegian historian

- Born: 30 August 1924; Bodø, Norway
- Died: 3 February 1999 (aged 74)
- Occupation: historian

Erik Gunnes (30 August 1924 – 3 February 1999) was a Norwegian historian.

He was born in Bodø to Bjørnulf Røe Gunnæs and Antonie Berg.

He studied theology in France, and served as Catholic priest in Oslo until 1965. He then focused on the study of Norwegian Middle Age history. From 1977 to 1991 he was appointed at the University of Oslo, eventually with a professorship in history.

Gunnes was awarded the Bastian Prize in 1977, for translation of a work by Isaac B. Singer.

Awards
Preceded by Carl Fredrik Engelstad	Recipient of the Bastian Prize; 1977	Succeeded by Geir Kjetsaa
