= Kjetså =

Village in Evje og Hornnes Municipality, Norway

- Village
- Interactive map of Kjetså
- Coordinates: 58.5421°N 07.7594°E
- Country: Norway
- Region: Southern Norway
- County: Agder
- District: Setesdal
- Municipality: Evje og Hornnes Municipality
- Elevation: 180 m (590 ft)
- Time zone: UTC+01:00 (CET)
  - Summer (DST): UTC+02:00 (CEST)
- Post Code: 4737 Hornnes

Kjetså is a village in Evje og Hornnes Municipality in Agder county, Norway. The village is located on the western shore of the river Otra, just south of the villages of Hornnes and Dåsnesmoen. The village of Moi lies about 5 kilometres (3.1 mi) south of Kjetså.
