= Geir Kjetsaa =

Norwegian academic (1937–2008)

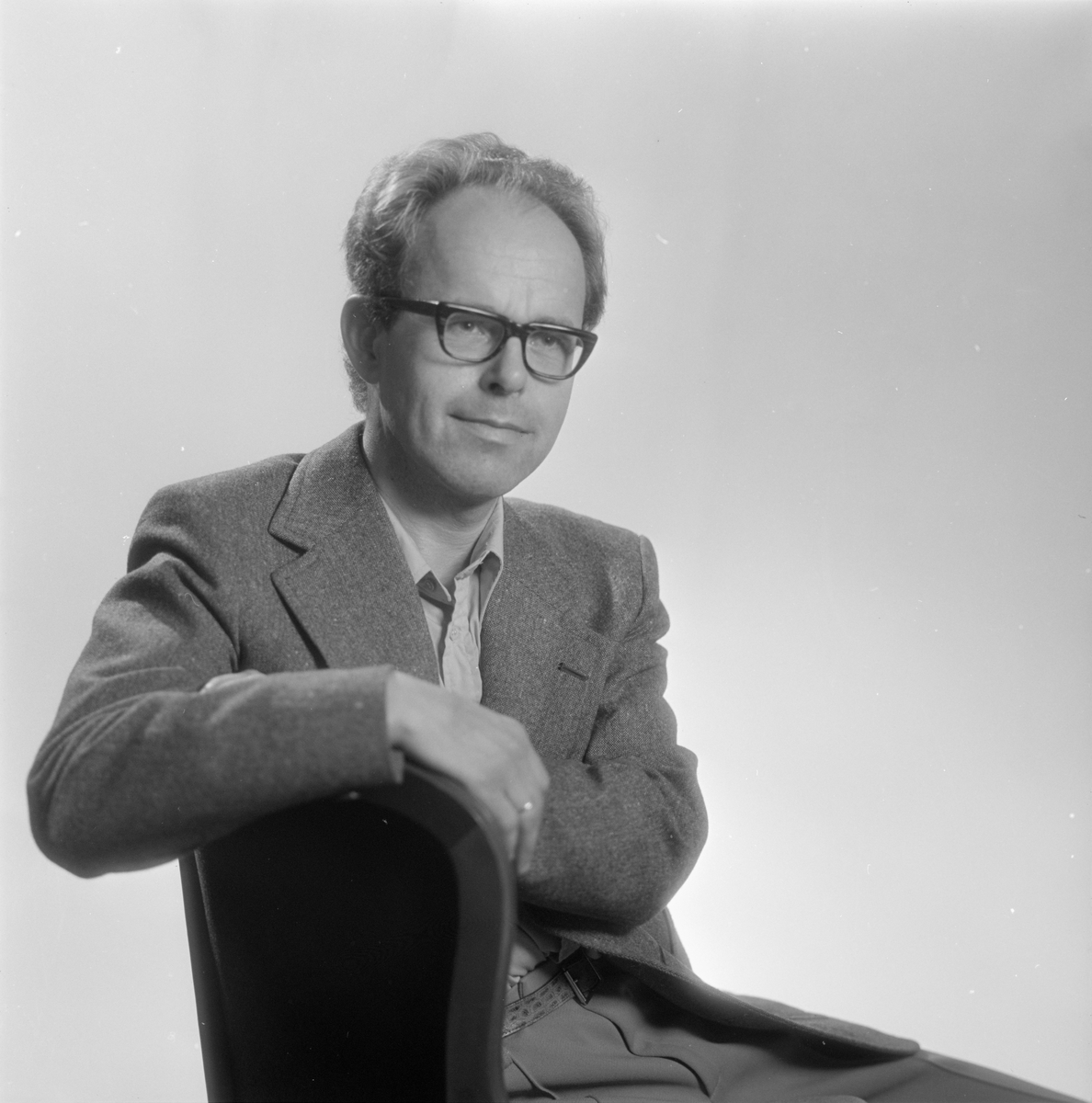
- Kjetsaa in 1977
- Born: 2 June 1937; Oslo, Norway
- Died: 2 June 2008 (aged 71)
- Occupations: Professor in Russian literary history, and translator of Russian literature
- Employer: University of Oslo
- Notable work: Biographies of classical Russian writers (Baratynsky, Dostoevsky, Gogol, Gorky, Tolstoy, Chekhov)

Geir Kjetsaa (2 June 1937 – 2 June 2008) was a Norwegian professor in Russian literary history at the University of Oslo, translator of Russian literature, and author of several biographies of classical Russian writers.

== Biography ==
He was born in Oslo, Norway. He was the son of Thorleif Kjetsaa (1907–69) and Marit Elen Hansen (1912–82). He grew up and died in Hornnes. He graduated as cand.philol. in 1963, took the dr.philos. degree in 1969, and was appointed professor in 1971. Kjetsaa was member of the Norwegian Academy of Science and Letters and of the Norwegian Academy for Language and Literature.

A 1984 monograph by Kjetsaa and others used statistical analyses which support the view that Mikhail Sholokhov was likely the true author of And Quiet Flows the Don - defending the Soviet writer against persistent allegations of plagiarizing. Among his other biographies were works on Yevgeny Baratynsky, Fyodor Dostoevsky, Nikolai Gogol, Maxim Gorky, Leo Tolstoy and Anton Chekhov.

== Selected writings ==
- Jevgenij Baratynskij: Liv og diktning (thesis, 1969)
- A norm for the use of poetical language in the age of Puskin: A comparative analysis (1983)
- The Authorship of The Quiet Don (1984)
- Fjodor Dostojevskij, et dikterliv (biography, 1985) (Fyodor Dostoyevsky: A Writer's Life)
- Nikolaj Gogol: Den gåtefulle dikteren (biography, 1990)
- Maksim Gorkij: En dikterskjebne (biography, 1994)
- Lev Tolstoj: Den russiske jords store dikter (biography, 1999)
- Tsjekhov (biography, 2004)

== Awards ==
- 2000: Fritt Ord Honorary Award.
- 2004: Anders Jahre cultural prize (Anders Jahres kulturpris) (jointly with Ingvar Ambjørnsen).
- 2007: Decorated Commander of the Royal Norwegian Order of St. Olav.

Awards
Preceded by Erik Gunnes	Recipient of the Bastian Prize; 1978	Succeeded by Arne Dørumsgaard
