= Evje (village) =

Village in Evje og Hornnes Municipality, Norway

- Village
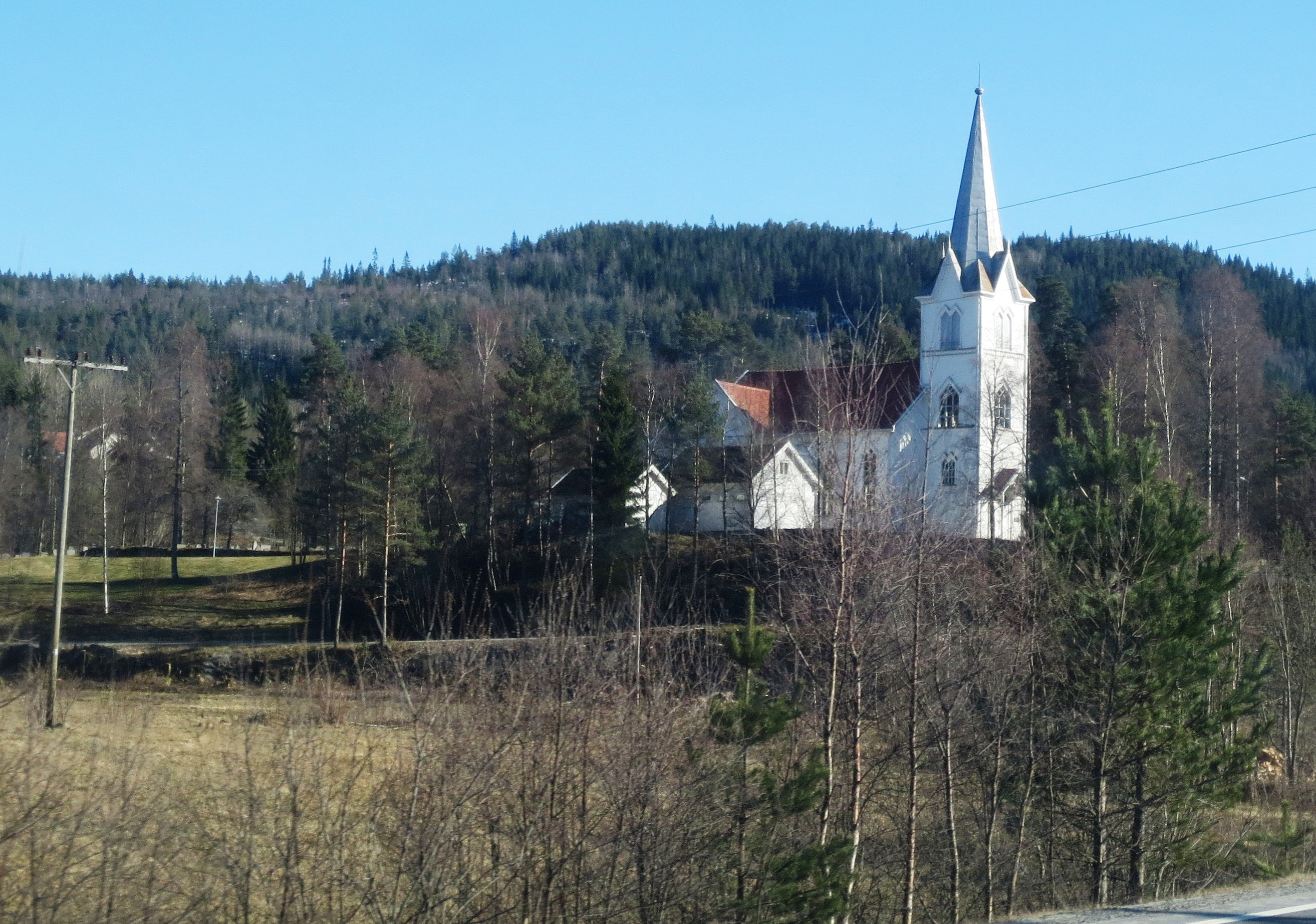
- View of the village church
- Interactive map of Evje
- Coordinates: 58.5857°N 07.8036°E
- Country: Norway
- Region: Southern Norway
- County: Agder
- District: Setesdal
- Municipality: Evje og Hornnes Municipality

Area
  - Total: 3.18 km^{2} (1.23 sq mi)
- Elevation: 185 m (607 ft)

Population (2025)
  - Total: 2,501
  - Density: 786/km^{2} (2,040/sq mi)
- Time zone: UTC+01:00 (CET)
  - Summer (DST): UTC+02:00 (CEST)
- Post Code: 4735 Evje

Evje is the administrative centre of Evje og Hornnes Municipality in Agder county, Norway. The village is located along the river Otra. It sits along the Norwegian National Road 9, about 10 kilometres (6.2 mi) south of the village of Byglandsfjorden and immediately north of Evjemoen, a former military base.

The 3.18-square-kilometre (790-acre) urban area of Evje has a population (2025) of 2,501 and a population density of 786 inhabitants per square kilometre (2,040/sq mi). Other villages in the urban area of Evje include Evjemoen, Dåsnesmoen, Hornnes, and Kjetså.

Evje Church lies on the north end of the village on the east shore of the river Otra, and Hornnes Church lies about 6 kilometres (3.7 mi) to the south on the west shore of the river Otra. Hornnes Church is actually located in the small village of Hornnes which is still considered a part of the Evje urban area.

== History ==
Historically, the village of Evje was the administrative centre of the old Evje og Vegusdal Municipality from 1838 until 1877, then from 1877 until 1960 it was the administrative centre of the old Evje Municipality, and since then it has been the centre of Evje og Hornnes Municipality.

=== Name ===
The municipality (originally the parish) of Evje is named after an old Evje farm (Old Norse: Efja), since the first Evje Church was built there. The name is identical with the word efja which means "eddy".
