= Evje og Hornnes Municipality =

Municipality in Agder, Norway

Evje og Hornnes Municipality Evje og Hornnes kommune
- Municipality
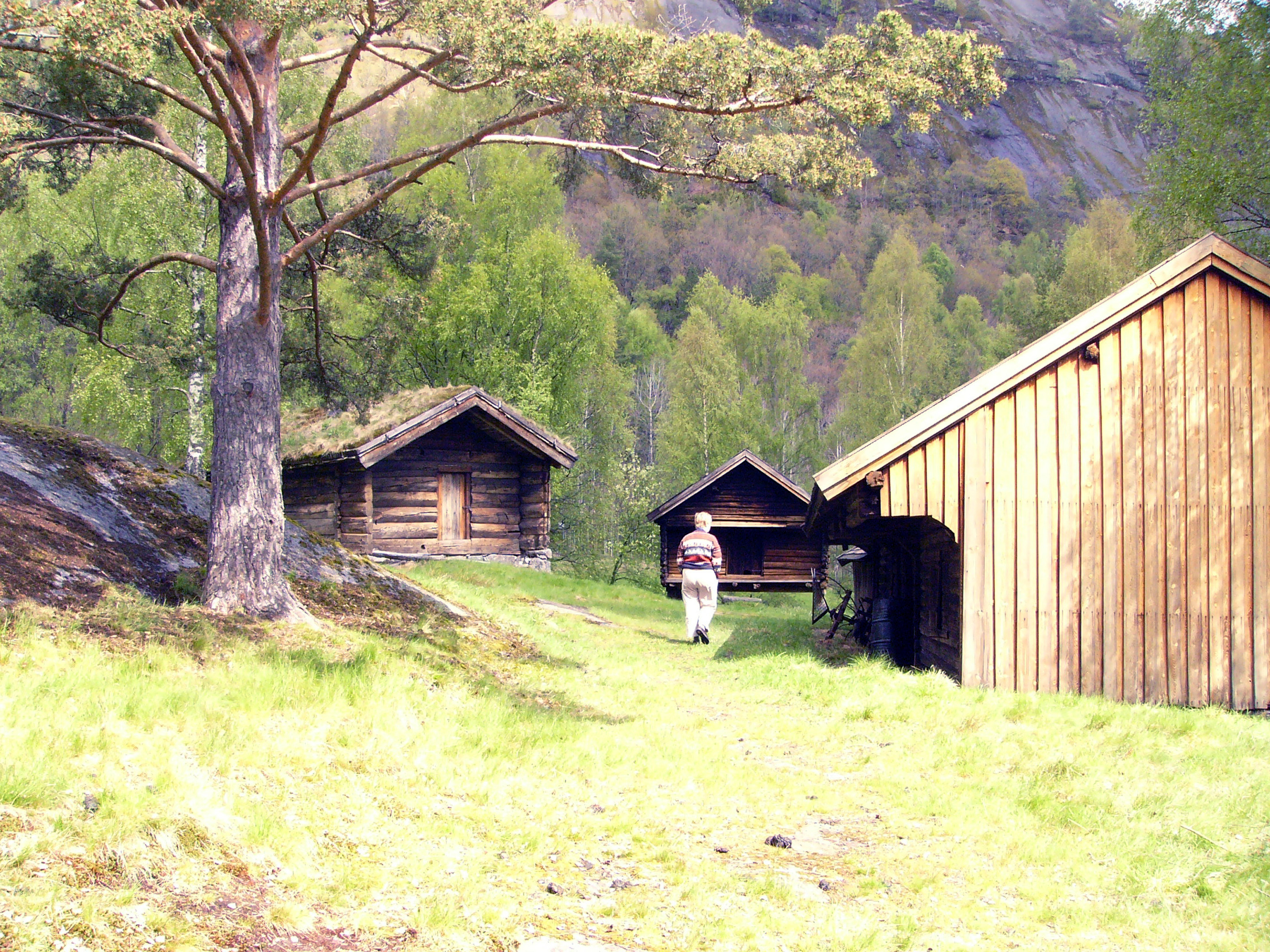
- View of an open-air museum in Evje og Hornnes

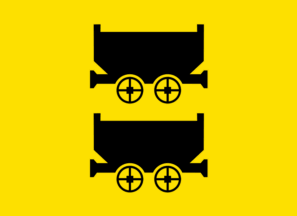
- Flag Coat of arms

- Agder within Norway

- Evje og Hornnes within Agder
- Coordinates: 58°35′05″N 07°46′14″E
- Country: Norway
- County: Agder
- District: Setesdal
- Established: 1 Jan 1960
  - Preceded by: Evje Municipality and Hornnes Municipality
- Administrative centre: Evje

Government
  - Mayor (2023): Morten Haraldstad (KrF)

Area
  - Total: 587.08 km^{2} (226.67 sq mi)
  - Land: 548.69 km^{2} (211.85 sq mi)
  - Water: 38.39 km^{2} (14.82 sq mi) 6.5%
  - Rank: #190 in Norway
- Highest elevation: 789.88 m (2,591.5 ft)

Population (2026)
  - Total: 3,842
  - Rank: #210 in Norway
  - Density: 7/km^{2} (18/sq mi)
  - Change (10 years): ▲ +7.3%
- Demonym(s): Evjedøl; Honndøl

Official language
  - Norwegian form: Neutral
- Time zone: UTC+01:00 (CET)
  - Summer (DST): UTC+02:00 (CEST)
- ISO 3166 code: NO-4219
- Website: Official website

Evje og Hornnes is a municipality in Agder county, Norway. It is located in the traditional district of Setesdal. The administrative centre of the municipality is the village of Evje. Other villages in the municipality include Åneland, Dåsnesmoen, Flatebygd, Gautestad, Hornnes, Kjetså, Moi, and Øvre Dåsvatn. Evje og Hornnes was created as a new municipality on 1 January 1960 after the merger of Evje Municipality and Hornnes Municipality. The Norwegian National Road 9 runs north–south through the municipality, along the river Otra.

The 587.08-square-kilometre (226.67 sq mi) municipality is the 190th largest by area out of the 357 municipalities in Norway. Evje og Hornnes Municipality is the 210th most populous municipality in Norway with a population of 3,842. The municipality's population density is 7 inhabitants per square kilometre (18/sq mi) and its population has increased by 7.3% over the previous 10-year period.

== General information ==
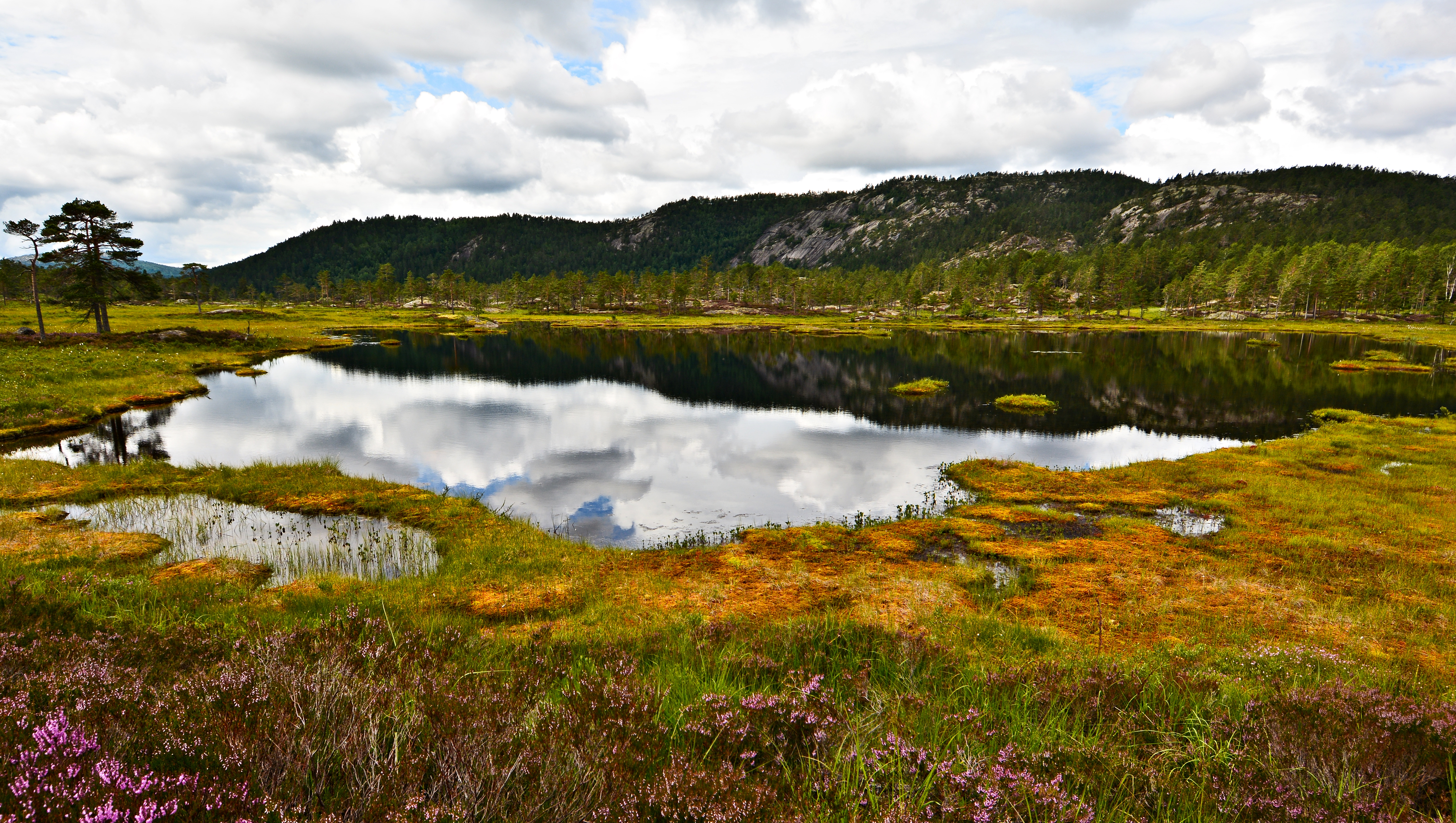
Rural landscape of the municipality

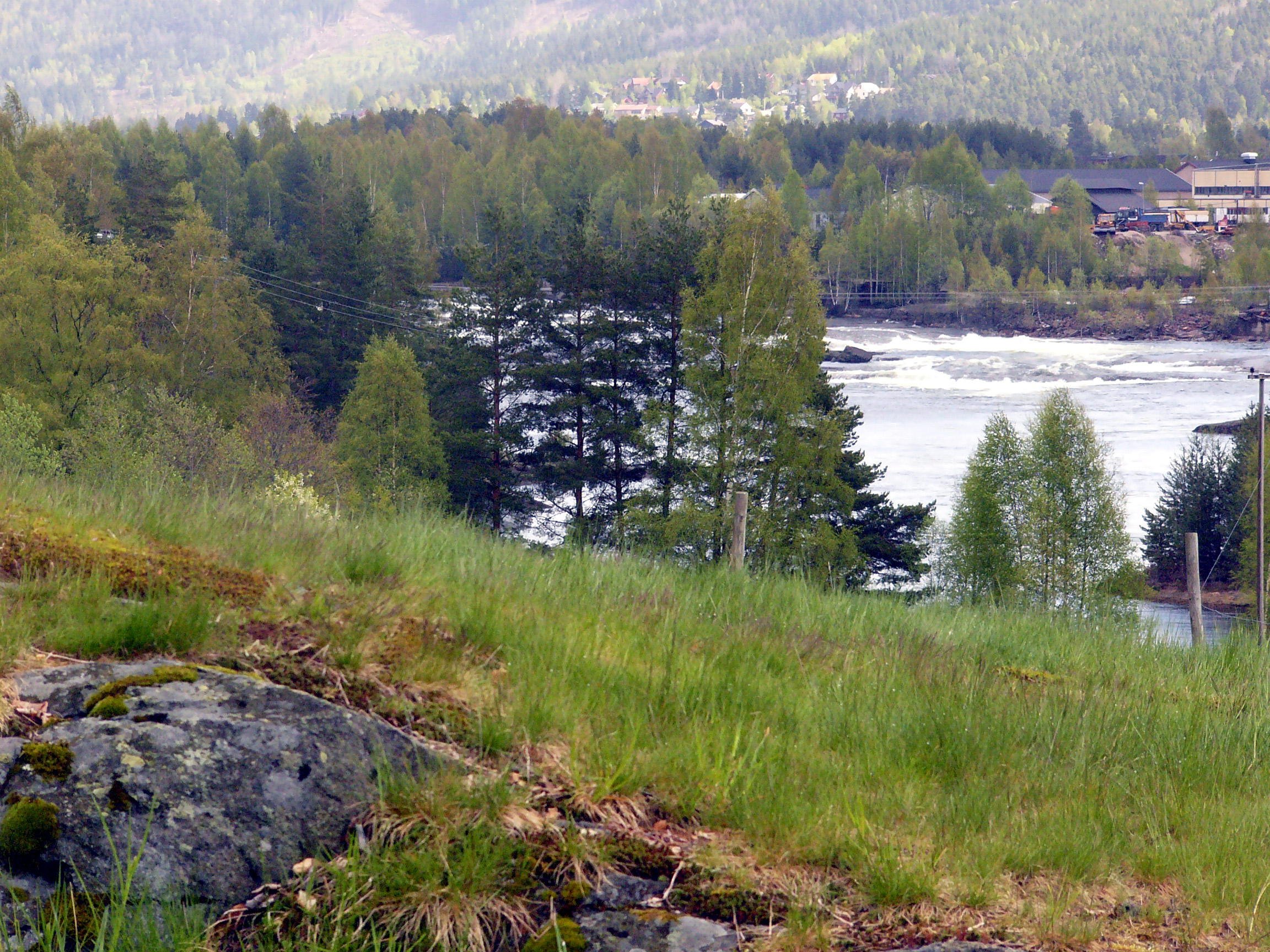
View of the Fennefoss area

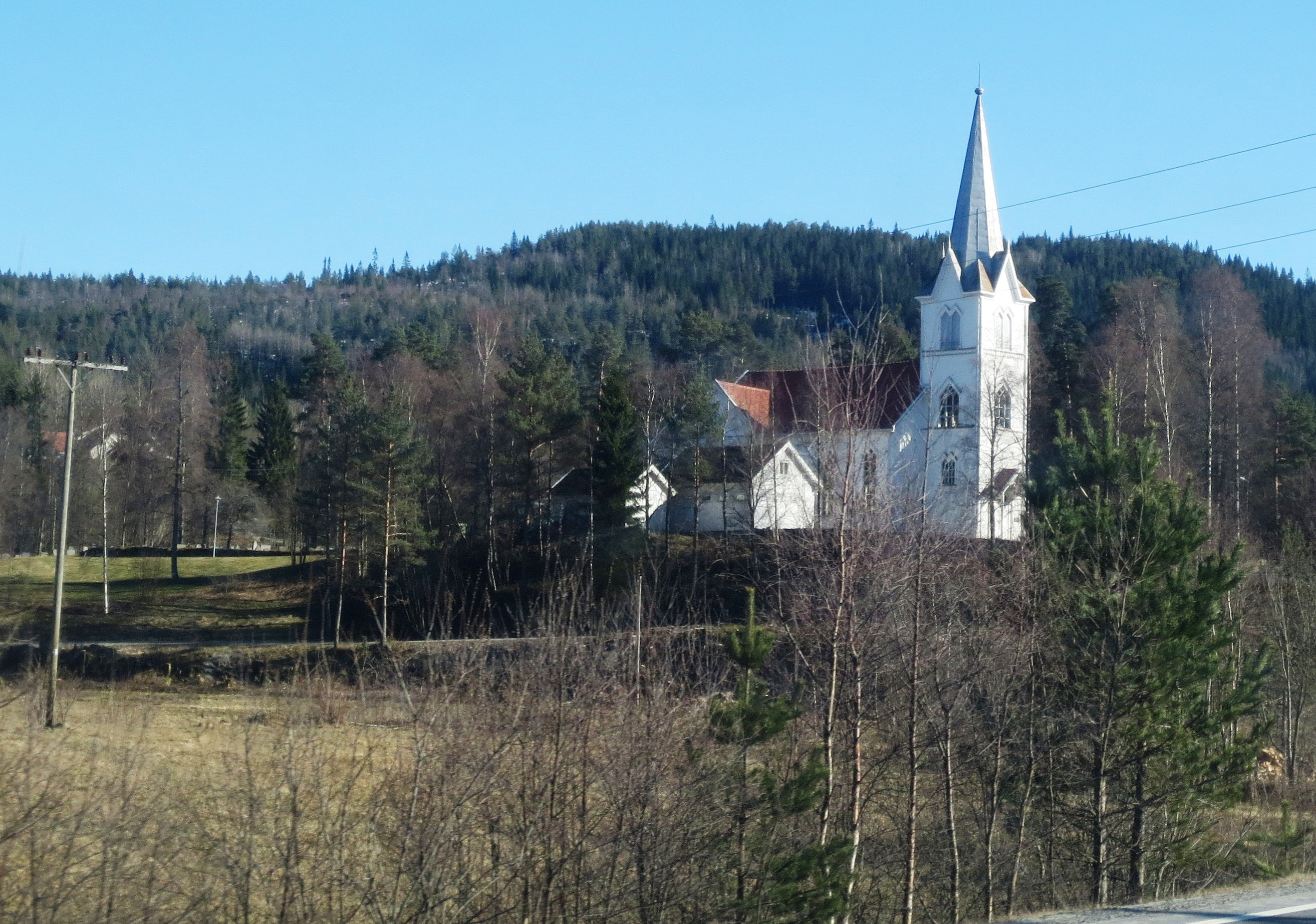
Evje Church

=== Administrative history ===
During the 1960s, there were many municipal mergers across Norway due to the work of the Schei Committee. On 1 January 1960, Evje Municipality (population: 1,646) and its neighbor Hornnes Municipality (population: 1,280) were merged to form the new Evje og Hornnes Municipality. On 1 January 1986, the Lislevand farm area (population: 8) was transferred from the neighboring Birkenes Municipality to Evje og Hornnes Municipality. On 1 January 2019, the Hovlandsdalen area (population: 27) was transferred from neighboring Birkenes Municipality to Evje og Hornnes Municipality.

In 2020, there were many municipal and county mergers across Norway due to the work of the Solberg cabinet. Historically, this municipality was part of the old Aust-Agder county. On 1 January 2020, the municipality became a part of the newly-formed Agder county (after Aust-Agder and Vest-Agder counties were merged).

=== Name ===
When Evje Municipality and Hornnes Municipality were merged in 1960, the new resulting municipality was given the compound name Evje og Hornnes, literally meaning "Evje and Hornnes".

The old Evje Municipality (originally the parish) is named after the old Evje farm (Old Norse: Efja) since the first Evje Church was built there. The name is identical to the word efja which means "backwater" or "mud" (likely referring to a shallow, backwater part of the local river Otra).

The old Hornnes Municipality (originally the parish) is named after the old Hornnes farm (Old Norse: Hornnes) since the first Hornnes Church was built there. The first element is horn which means "horn". The last element is nes which means "headland". So the meaning of Hornnes is "the headland shaped like a horn". This is likely referring to the two horn-shaped peninsulas that jut out into the river Otra at the entrance to the lake Breidflå.

=== Coat of arms ===
The coat of arms was granted on 24 April 1992. The official blazon is "Or, two wagons sable in pale" (Norwegian: På gull grunn to svarte vogner, 1-1). This means the arms have a charge that is two black mining wagons in the centre, one above the other. The field (background) of the arms have a tincture of Or which means it is commonly colored yellow, but if it is made out of metal, then gold is used. The arms were chosen because mining has been of great importance for the area already for many centuries. One of Europe's largest nickel mines is in the municipality. There are two wagons to represent the fact that the municipality was created from Evje Municipality and Hornnes Municipality. The arms were designed by Daniel Rike. The municipal flag has the same design as the coat of arms.

=== Churches ===
The Church of Norway has two parishes (sokn) within Evje og Hornnes Municipality. It is part of the Otredal prosti (deanery) in the Diocese of Agder og Telemark.

Churches in Evje og Hornnes Municipality
Parish (sokn)	Church name	Location of the church	Year built
Evje	Evje Church	Evje	1891
Hornnes	Hornnes Church	Hornnes	1828

== History ==
The Flåt mine in Evje og Hornnes Municipality was Europe's largest nickel mine for a period. Flåt mine came into operation in 1844 as a copper mine. From 1872 until 1946 it was mined for nickel. At the point operations were terminated, it was 422 metres (1,385 ft) deep (reaching below sea level). Over 3 million tons of ore were removed and refined into 14,500 tonnes (14,300 long tons; 16,000 short tons) of copper and 20,000 tonnes (20,000 long tons; 22,000 short tons) of nickel. Local mining technology and mine history can be seen at the museum at Fennefoss, just outside of the village of Evje.

Evjemoen was a Norwegian military camp in use from 1912 to 2002. The camp lies south of Evje, on the eastern shore of the river Otra. From 1953 to 1995, Evjemoen was used as a training area for Infanteriets øvingsavdeling II (IØ2). The camp was retired in December 2002.

== Geography ==
Evje og Hornnes Municipality is bordered by Bygland Municipality and Froland Municipality to the northeast and by Birkenes Municipality and Iveland Municipality to the southeast. To the west it is bounded by Åseral Municipality and Lyngdal Municipality and to the south by Lindesnes Municipality and Vennesla Municipality.

The Otra river, which flows through Evje og Hornnes Municipality, is the largest river in the Sørlandet district. It flows from the Setesdalsheiene mountains to the north in Bykle Municipality down to Kristiansand Municipality in the south. The lake Kilefjorden is part of the Otra river, along the southern part of the municipality.

The lake Gyvatn is located along the border with Bygland Municipality and Åseral Municipality. The lake Høvringsvatnet is located about 10 kilometres (6.2 mi) northeast of the village of Evje. The lake Byglandsfjorden has its southernmost point in the northern part of the municipality. The highest point in the municipality is the 789.88-metre (2,591.5 ft) tall mountain Midtstrandnuten, on the northern border with Åseral Municipality.

== Government ==
Evje og Hornnes Municipality is responsible for primary education (through 10th grade), outpatient health services, senior citizen services, welfare and other social services, zoning, economic development, and municipal roads and utilities. The municipality is governed by a municipal council of directly elected representatives. The mayor is indirectly elected by a vote of the municipal council. The municipality is under the jurisdiction of the Agder District Court and the Agder Court of Appeal.

=== Municipal council ===
The municipal council (Kommunestyre) of Evje og Hornnes Municipality is made up of 21 representatives that are elected to four year terms. The tables below show the current and historical composition of the council by political party.

Evje og Hornnes kommunestyre 2023–2027
Party name (in Norwegian)	Number of representatives
Labour Party (Arbeiderpartiet)	7
Progress Party (Fremskrittspartiet)	1
Conservative Party (Høyre)	5
Christian Democratic Party (Kristelig Folkeparti)	4
Centre Party (Senterpartiet)	2
Liberal Party (Venstre)	2
Total number of members:	21

Evje og Hornnes kommunestyre 2019–2023
Party name (in Norwegian)	Number of representatives
Labour Party (Arbeiderpartiet)	8
Progress Party (Fremskrittspartiet)	1
Conservative Party (Høyre)	2
Christian Democratic Party (Kristelig Folkeparti)	5
Centre Party (Senterpartiet)	3
Liberal Party (Venstre)	2
Total number of members:	21

Evje og Hornnes kommunestyre 2015–2019
Party name (in Norwegian)	Number of representatives
Labour Party (Arbeiderpartiet)	6
Progress Party (Fremskrittspartiet)	1
Conservative Party (Høyre)	2
Christian Democratic Party (Kristelig Folkeparti)	9
Centre Party (Senterpartiet)	2
Liberal Party (Venstre)	1
Total number of members:	21

Evje og Hornnes kommunestyre 2011–2015
Party name (in Norwegian)	Number of representatives
Labour Party (Arbeiderpartiet)	6
Progress Party (Fremskrittspartiet)	1
Conservative Party (Høyre)	4
Christian Democratic Party (Kristelig Folkeparti)	7
Centre Party (Senterpartiet)	2
Cross-party local list (Tverrpolitisk Bygdeliste)	1
Total number of members:	21

Evje og Hornnes kommunestyre 2007–2011
Party name (in Norwegian)	Number of representatives
Labour Party (Arbeiderpartiet)	5
Progress Party (Fremskrittspartiet)	2
Conservative Party (Høyre)	1
Christian Democratic Party (Kristelig Folkeparti)	6
Centre Party (Senterpartiet)	3
Cross-party local list (Tverrpolitisk bygdeliste)	4
Total number of members:	21

Evje og Hornnes kommunestyre 2003–2007
Party name (in Norwegian)	Number of representatives
Labour Party (Arbeiderpartiet)	7
Progress Party (Fremskrittspartiet)	3
Conservative Party (Høyre)	1
Christian Democratic Party (Kristelig Folkeparti)	5
Centre Party (Senterpartiet)	2
Socialist Left Party (Sosialistisk Venstreparti)	3
Total number of members:	21

Evje og Hornnes kommunestyre 1999–2003
Party name (in Norwegian)	Number of representatives
Labour Party (Arbeiderpartiet)	8
Progress Party (Fremskrittspartiet)	1
Conservative Party (Høyre)	3
Christian Democratic Party (Kristelig Folkeparti)	5
Centre Party (Senterpartiet)	3
Liberal Party (Venstre)	1
Total number of members:	21

Evje og Hornnes kommunestyre 1995–1999
Party name (in Norwegian)	Number of representatives
Labour Party (Arbeiderpartiet)	10
Conservative Party (Høyre)	3
Christian Democratic Party (Kristelig Folkeparti)	4
Centre Party (Senterpartiet)	3
Liberal Party (Venstre)	1
Total number of members:	21

Evje og Hornnes kommunestyre 1991–1995
Party name (in Norwegian)	Number of representatives
Labour Party (Arbeiderpartiet)	7
Progress Party (Fremskrittspartiet)	1
Conservative Party (Høyre)	4
Christian Democratic Party (Kristelig Folkeparti)	3
Centre Party (Senterpartiet)	4
Socialist Left Party (Sosialistisk Venstreparti)	1
Liberal Party (Venstre)	1
Total number of members:	21

Evje og Hornnes kommunestyre 1987–1991
Party name (in Norwegian)	Number of representatives
Labour Party (Arbeiderpartiet)	11
Progress Party (Fremskrittspartiet)	1
Conservative Party (Høyre)	3
Christian Democratic Party (Kristelig Folkeparti)	3
Centre Party (Senterpartiet)	2
Liberal Party (Venstre)	1
Total number of members:	21

Evje og Hornnes kommunestyre 1983–1987
Party name (in Norwegian)	Number of representatives
Labour Party (Arbeiderpartiet)	11
Conservative Party (Høyre)	3
Christian Democratic Party (Kristelig Folkeparti)	3
Centre Party (Senterpartiet)	2
Socialist Left Party (Sosialistisk Venstreparti)	1
Liberal Party (Venstre)	1
Total number of members:	21

Evje og Hornnes kommunestyre 1979–1983
Party name (in Norwegian)	Number of representatives
Labour Party (Arbeiderpartiet)	9
Conservative Party (Høyre)	4
Christian Democratic Party (Kristelig Folkeparti)	4
Centre Party (Senterpartiet)	3
Joint list of the Liberal Party (Venstre) and New People's Party (Nye Folkepartiet)	1
Total number of members:	21

Evje og Hornnes kommunestyre 1975–1979
Party name (in Norwegian)	Number of representatives
Labour Party (Arbeiderpartiet)	10
Conservative Party (Høyre)	3
Christian Democratic Party (Kristelig Folkeparti)	4
Centre Party (Senterpartiet)	3
Socialist Left Party (Sosialistisk Venstreparti)	1
Total number of members:	21

Evje og Hornnes kommunestyre 1971–1975
Party name (in Norwegian)	Number of representatives
Labour Party (Arbeiderpartiet)	12
Conservative Party (Høyre)	1
Christian Democratic Party (Kristelig Folkeparti)	3
Centre Party (Senterpartiet)	3
Liberal Party (Venstre)	2
Total number of members:	21

Evje og Hornnes kommunestyre 1967–1971
Party name (in Norwegian)	Number of representatives
Labour Party (Arbeiderpartiet)	12
Conservative Party (Høyre)	2
Christian Democratic Party (Kristelig Folkeparti)	2
Centre Party (Senterpartiet)	2
Liberal Party (Venstre)	3
Total number of members:	21

Evje og Hornnes kommunestyre 1963–1967
Party name (in Norwegian)	Number of representatives
Labour Party (Arbeiderpartiet)	12
Centre Party (Senterpartiet)	4
Liberal Party (Venstre)	5
Total number of members:	21

Evje og Hornnes kommunestyre 1960–1963
Party name (in Norwegian)	Number of representatives
Labour Party (Arbeiderpartiet)	12
Conservative Party (Høyre)	1
Centre Party (Senterpartiet)	4
Liberal Party (Venstre)	4
Total number of members:	21
Note: Evje og Hornnes Municipality was established on 1 January 1960 when Evje Municipality and Hornnes Municipality were merged.

=== Mayors ===
The mayor (Norwegian: ordfører) of Evje og Hornnes Municipality is the political leader of the municipality and the chairperson of the municipal council. The following people have held this position:

- 1960–1965: Torvald Haavardstad (Ap)
- 1965–1966: Gunnar Uleberg (Ap)
- 1966–1975: Gunnar Østerhus (Ap)
- 1976–1979: Jostein Berget (Ap)
- 1980–1983: Asbjørn Kjetsaa (Sp)
- 1984–1989: Jostein Berget (Ap)
- 1990–1991: Bjarne Johansen (Ap)
- 1991–1993: Carl Martin Thorsen (H)
- 1993–1999: Svein Tallaksen (Ap)
- 1999–2019: Bjørn A. Ropstad (KrF)
- 2019–2023: Svein Arne Haugen (Ap)
- 2023–present: Morten Haraldstad (KrF)

== Geology ==
Evje og Hornnes Municipality is situated at the southwestern margin of the Baltic Shield, the exposed section of the East European craton. Rocks in the area are dominated by different types of precambrian gneis and a large metagabbro body stretching into the neighboring Iveland municipality.

During the final stages of Sveconorwegian (0.9–1.1 gigaannum) orogeny, a large pluton of granitic/monzonitic composition was emplaced in the northern part of the municipality and is assumed to have a relationship with the thousands of pegmatite veins in the Evje-Iveland area.

Earlier during the Sveconorwegian orogeny, mafic rocks (gabbro-diorite) were emplaced. Most of the gabbro has been affected by the Sveconorwegian orogeny and became a metagabbro (amfibolite) with only minor remnants of the original gabbro. The Flåt Nickel Mine is situated at the north-western margin in a diorite intrusion post-dating the gabbro.

The pegmatites of the Evje-Iveland area have become worldwide known for a large number of rare and often crystallized minerals.

The pegmatites were initially mined for quartz, used in the melter at Fennefoss to extract the nickel from the ore from the Flåt Nickel Mine. Later, large quantities of feldspar were mined for use in the ceramic industry, both in Norway and abroad. Also mica (muscovite), beryl, rare-earth minerals, scandium ore, and minor quantities of uranium ore were mined.

After 1983, almost all mines were abandoned, and nowadays only minor quantities of "tannspat" or dentalspat are mined in a couple of mines. This is microcline or plagioclase feldspar of very high purity and used to make porcelain teeth-fillings or dentures. The tannspat is exported to Germany, Liechtenstein, Austria, and sometimes Japan.

A number of the mines is still open to mineral collectors.

== Economy ==
The area is internationally known for its geology and its mineral richness. Deposits of nickel, quartz, feldspar, mica, beryl, REE minerals, scandium, and uranium ore have been exploited. Nowadays only ultra-pure feldspar for dental applications is being mined.

Tourism is a major source of income for the entire area. During the summer, many thousands of tourist visit Evje. Outdoor activities in the area include rafting, rock climbing, biking, cross-country skiing, kayaking, canoeing, paddling, water skiing, riverboarding, swimming, fishing, mineral collecting, and mine excursions. Additionally, there are several museums and farms open to visitors.

The shopping center of Evje is of regional importance. In addition, there is some industry in Evje. One such industry is Skibsplast, a producer of fiberglass boats.

== Attractions ==
=== Geology ===
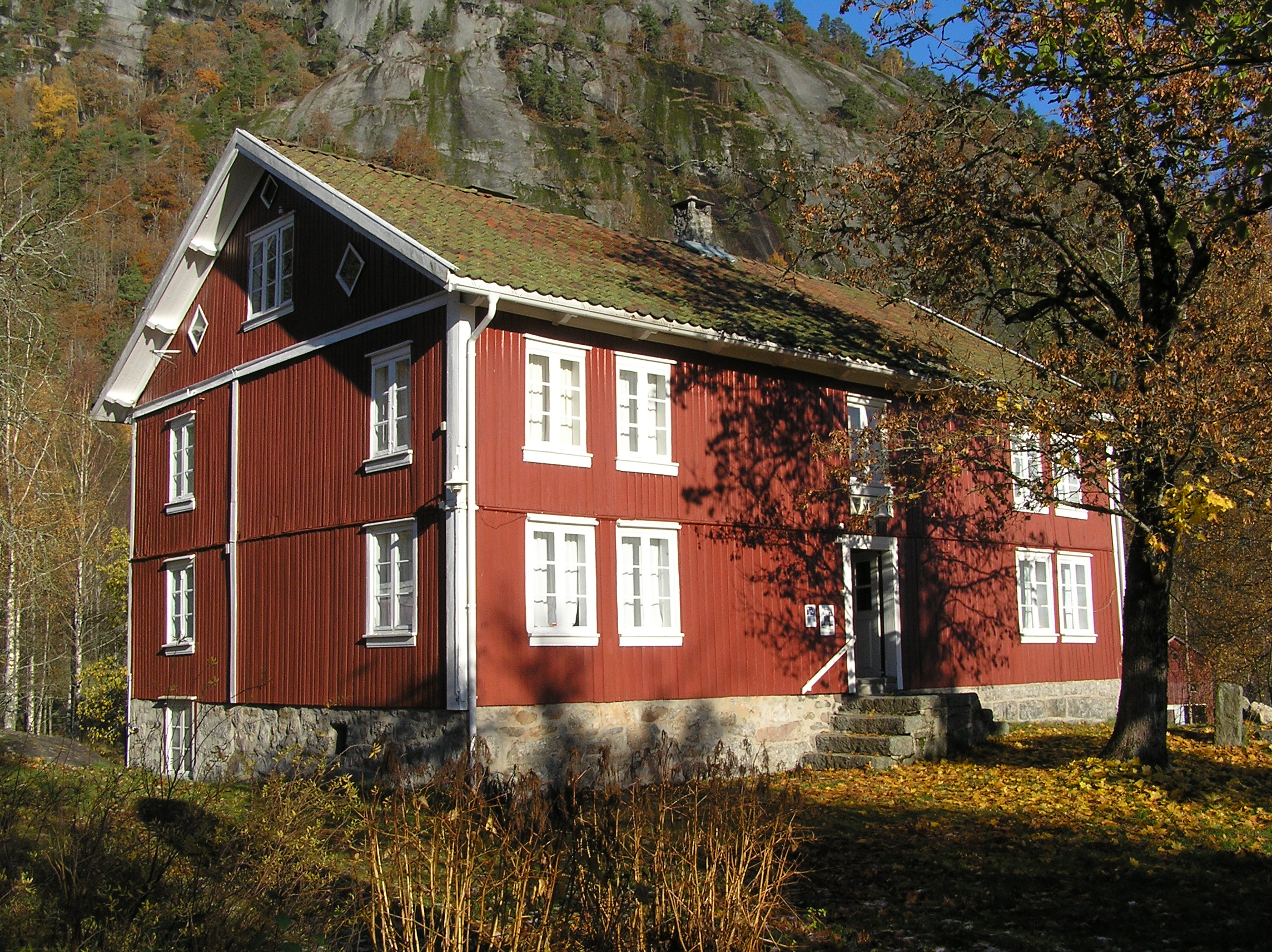
Evfje og Hornnes geomuseum Fennefoss

- Evje og Hornnes geomuseum Fennefoss

The Setesdal museum manages the Evje og Hornnes Geomuseum Fennesfoss, which is based out of Rysstad in Valle Municipality. The geomuseum has an extensive collection of local minerals, most notably minerals from the pegmatite veins in the Evje-Iveland district. These pegmatites have been exploited for quartz, feldspar, mica, beryl, thortveitite, REE-containing minerals and uraninite. In addition, gemstone material has been found: aquamarine, golden beryl, rock crystal, smoky quartz, citrine, spessartine and amazonite. The geomuseum has samples of all these minerals. Marie Curie had several consignments of radioactive minerals sent to her from this region. The museum includes a collection of laboratory equipment, among which an electroscope with "Pierre Curie" engraved.

- Mineralparken

The Mineralparken is located at Auensneset, 5 kilometres (3.1 mi) south of the village of Evje. The displays are entirely constructed in underground mining adits. The collection consists of more than 1000 foreign and Norwegian minerals. The outside area is an activity park for children.

- Flåt nickel mine (Flåt nikkelgruve)

The Flåt nickel mine was in operation 1872–1946, and was once Europe's largest in its kind. Most of the mining buildings have been torn down, but the area has been developed as a tourist attraction with many sign posts explaining what once has been at the different localtions.

- Evje mineral trail (Evje Mineralsti)

The five pegmatite quarries at the 2 kilometres (1.2 mi) long Evje Mineralsti trail that people can visit. It is possible to find samples of many types of minerals such as amazonite, different types of quartz, fluorite, pyrite and many others. It is also possible to find samples of the pegmatite rock, with feldspar/quartz/mica. The first mine, Landsverk I, is also the most mineral-rich pegmatite of the entire Evje-Iveland district.

- Oddestemmen steinsliperi

The Oddestemmen Steinsliperi is probably the only remaining historic stone-cutter workshop left in Norway. The workshop specializes in the cabochon technique and produces silver jewelry with stones from own production.

- Mineral tourism

The Evje-Iveland area is famous for its mineral richness. Several of the old pegmatite mines in the area are open to collectors. During the 2021 season the following mines are open: Knipane, Solås, Steli (all in Iveland), and Evje Mineralsti (in Evje).

=== Otra ===
The Otra river is the largest river in the south of Norway. It springs from the Setesdalsheiene in Bykle municipality and runs southwards to Kristiansand, where it runs out in the sea. The Otra is known for salmon fishing and is known for a rare salmon variety, the "bleka" or "bleke". The Otra is extensively used for outdoor activities, like rafting, paddling, swimming and fishing.

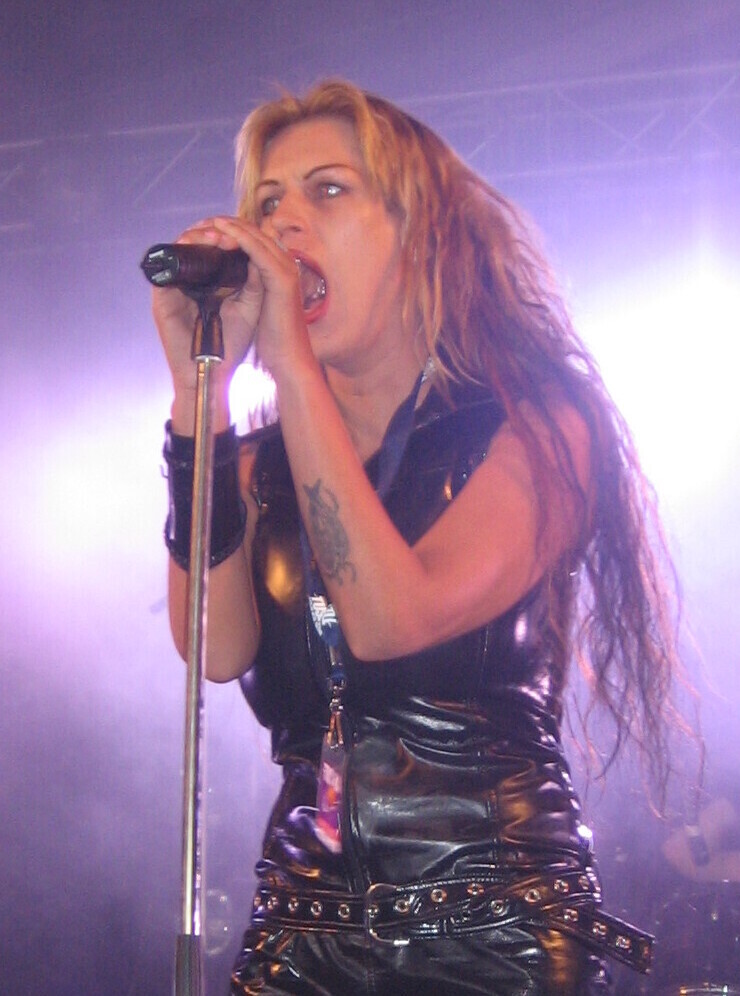
Helena Iren Michaelsen, 2007

== Notable people ==
- Jørgen Løvland (1848 in Evje – 1922), an educator and Prime Minister of Norway from 1907 to 1908
- Torleiv Hannaas (1874 in Hornnes – 1929), a philologist and academic
- Torvald Haavardstad (1893 in Evje – 1965), a teacher, church singer, and long-time mayor of Evje
- Geir Kjetsaa (1937–2008), a professor in Russian literary history who grew up and died in Hornnes
- Per Sefland (born 1949 in Evje), a police officer who served in various police roles and as Governor of Svalbard
- Helena Iren Michaelsen (born 1977 in Evje), a singer-songwriter with symphonic metal band Imperia
