= Høvringsvatnet =

Lake in Agder, Norway

- Høvringsvatn
- Interactive map of Høvringsvatnet
- Location: Evje og Hornnes Municipality, Agder
- Coordinates: 58.6413°N 07.9514°E
- Basin countries: Norway
- Max. length: 5 kilometres (3.1 mi)
- Max. width: 2 kilometres (1.2 mi)
- Surface area: 3.89 km^{2} (1.50 sq mi)
- Shore length^{1}: 20.9 kilometres (13.0 mi)
- Surface elevation: 481 metres (1,578 ft)
- References: NVE
- ^{1} Shore length is not a well-defined measure.

Høvringsvatnet is a lake in Evje og Hornnes Municipality in Agder county, Norway. It's located about 10 kilometres (6.2 mi) northeast of the village area of Evje and about 6 kilometres (3.7 mi) southeast of the village area of Byglandsfjord (in neighboring Bygland Municipality). The lake Homstølvatnet in Froland Municipality is located about 5 kilometres (3.1 mi) to the northeast.

The lake Høvringsvatnet covers an area of 3.89 square kilometres (1.50 sq mi) and has an elevation of 481 metres (1,578 ft) above sea level.

== See also ==
- List of lakes in Aust-Agder
- List of lakes in Norway
