= Norwegian National Road 9 =

Road in Norway

National Road 9
- Bokmål: Riksvei 9 Nynorsk: Riksveg 9
- Setesdalsveien

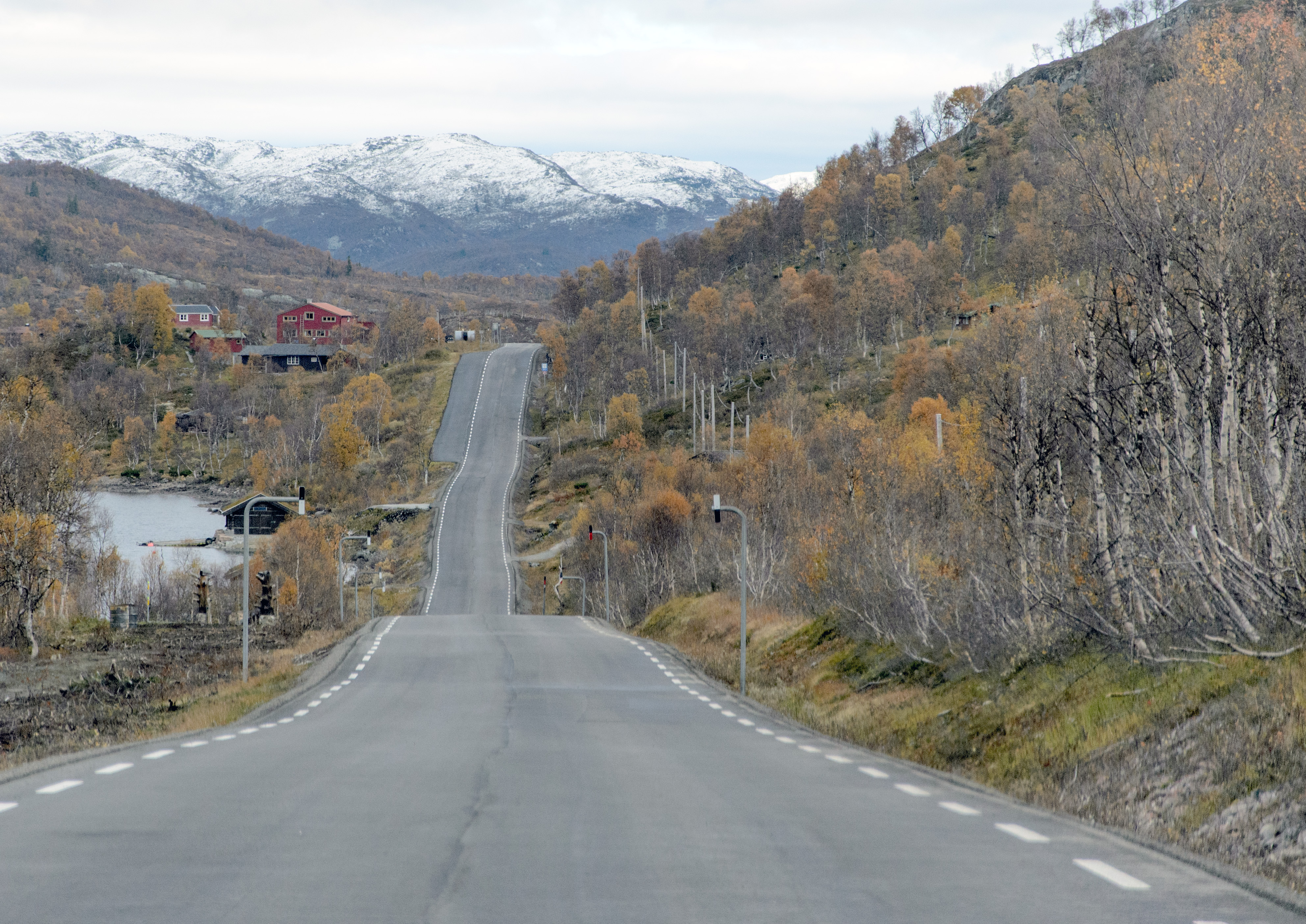

Route information
- Length: 238 km (148 mi)

Major junctions
- North end: Haukeligrend, Vinje Municipality
- E134 – Røldal, Åmot; E18 / E39 – Kristiansand
- South end: Grim, Kristiansand Municipality

Location
- Country: Norway

Highway system
- Roads in Norway; National Roads; County Roads
← Rv7	→ Rv13

Norwegian National Road 9 (Norwegian: Riksvei 9, Rv9) is often called the Setesdal Road (Norwegian: Setesdalsveien) and it is the main thoroughfare through the Setesdalen valley. It runs from the city of Kristiansand in the southern coast of Norway, through the Torridal and Setesdal valleys in Agder county to Haukeligrend in Telemark county in the north where it meets the European route E134 highway. The highway goes through the villages of Mosby, Homstean, Skarpengland, Hægeland, Hornesund, Hornnes, Evje, Byglandsfjord, Bygland, Ose, Rysstad, Valle, Flatland, Rygnestad, Bykle, Hovden, Bjåen, and Haukeli.

The highway is 235.7 kilometres (146.5 mi) long, with 220.1 kilometres (136.8 mi) in Agder county, and 15.6 kilometres (9.7 mi) in Telemark county. The highway connects to the European route E18 and European route E39 highways in the city of Kristiansand. At the other end of the highway, it connects to the European route E134 highway in Haukeli.

== History ==
Historically, parts of the road had an alternate way of traveling before this road was constructed. Between Kristiansand, Grovane, and Byglandsfjord, there was the old Setesdalsbanen railway line. The steamboat SS Bjoren ran from Byglandsfjord to the village of Bygland on the lake Byglandsfjorden before the road was built.

In Setesdal, people and animals used to trek across the mountains from Fyresdal and in the east, from Vinje in the north, from Suldal and Sirdal in the west in order to get to other areas. The so-called Bishops Road went from Fyresdal to Valle in Setesdal. A post road was built from the south into Setesdal in 1840. From 1867 to 1879 the post road was continued from Valle to Hovden. In 1936, the road reached Bjåen in the high mountains at the north end of Setesdal. After World War II, the road was built further north into Vinje Municipality in Telemark county.

There were two critical points in the construction of this road that were very difficult to build. The first was at Fånekleivi on the east shore of the Byglandsfjorden, about 5 kilometres (3.1 mi) south of the village of Bygland and the second one was at Byklestigen, just south of the village of Bykle. Both of these areas were difficult to pass using a horse and they could be dangerous in the winters. Today's road has corrected both of these difficult areas by building tunnels through the adjacent mountainsides. There is a 611-metre (2,005 ft) long tunnel through the mountain Fånefjell in Bygland and a 411-metre (1,348 ft) long tunnel at Byklestigen.

== Road reports ==
A list of some useful words for the road condition reports:

- Midlertidig stengt = Temporarily closed
- Redusert framkommelighet = Reduced mobility
- Kolonnekjøring = Driving in line after a snow plough truck only.
- Innsnevring = Narrowing
- Omkjøring = Detour
- Manuell dirigering = Manual routing
- Nattestengt = Closed by night
- Vegarbeid = Road work
- Kjøreforhold = Driving conditions
- Snø / snødekke = Snowy road
- Is / isdekke = Icy road
- Glatt = Slippery
- Bart = Bare road
- Vått = Wet road
- Fare for dyr = Watch out for animals
- Fare for elg = Watch out for moose
