= Hornnes Church =

Church in Agder, Norway

- Hornnes kyrkje
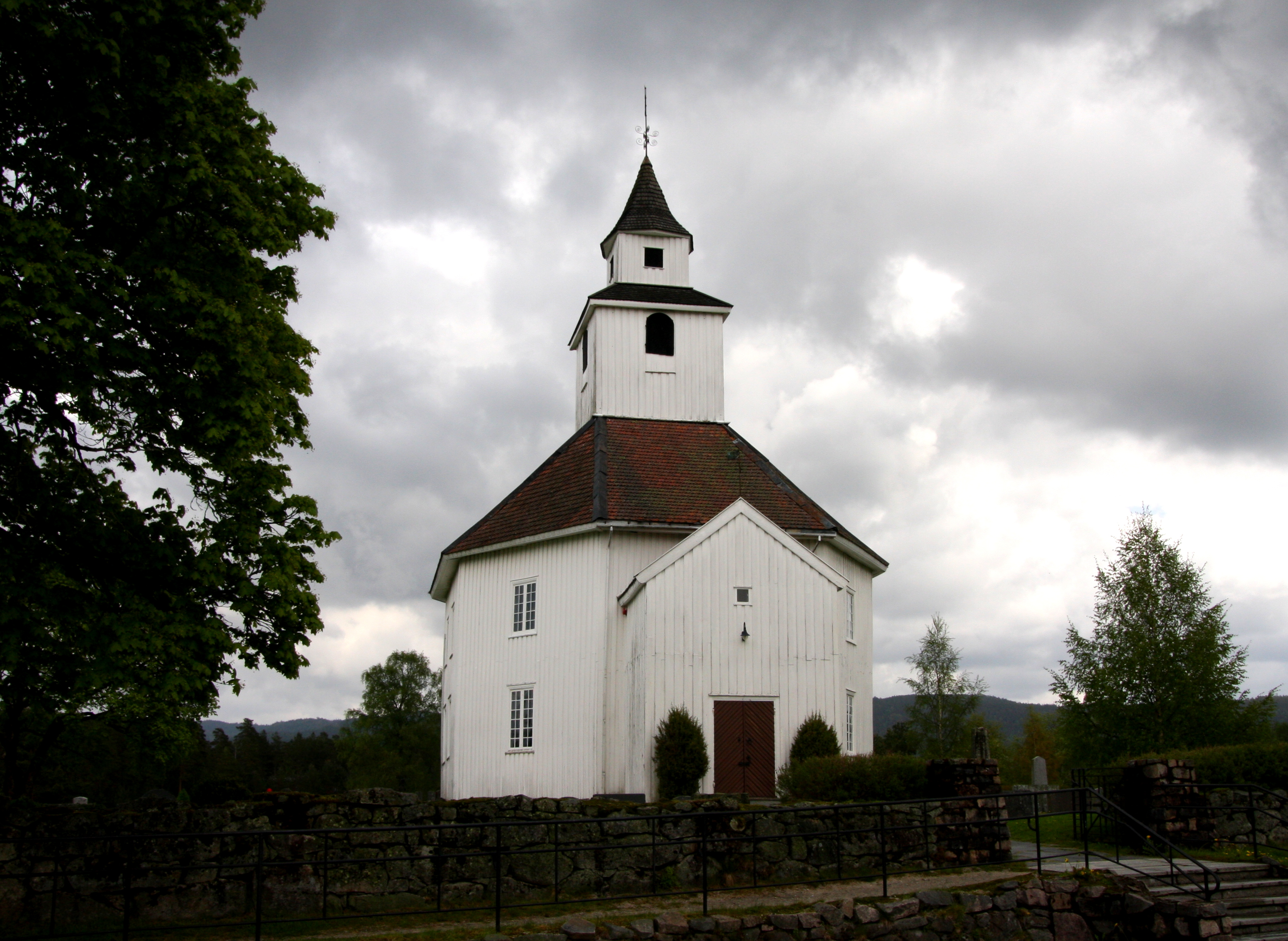
- View of the church
- Hornnes Church
- 58.55922°N 07.77338°E
- Location: Evje og Hornnes, Agder
- Country: Norway
- Denomination: Church of Norway
- Previous denomination: Catholic Church
- Churchmanship: Evangelical Lutheran

History
- Status: Parish church
- Founded: 12th century
- Consecrated: 22 June 1828

Architecture
- Functional status: Active
- Architect: Lars Larsen Forsæth
- Architectural type: Octagonal
- Completed: 1828 (198 years ago)

Specifications
- Capacity: 300
- Materials: Wood

Administration
- Diocese: Agder og Telemark
- Deanery: Otredal prosti
- Parish: Evje og Hornnes
- Norwegian Cultural Heritage Site
- Type: Church
- Status: Automatically protected
- ID: 84634

Hornnes Church (Norwegian: Hornnes kyrkje) is a parish church of the Church of Norway in Evje og Hornnes Municipality in Agder county, Norway. It is located in the village of Hornnes. It is one of the churches for the Evje og Hornnes parish which is part of the Otredal prosti (deanery) in the Diocese of Agder og Telemark. The white, wooden church was built in an octagonal design in 1828 by Leg Askildsen Hallingskaar, a builder from Laudal who was using plans drawn up by the architect Lars Larsen Forsæth (based on the same plans for Klæbu Church). The church seats about 300 people.

The church has changed little since the time of construction. The interior is symmetrical with the pulpit in the central axis in front of the altar, following the model of the Christiansborg Castle Church in Copenhagen.

== History ==
The earliest existing historical records of the church date back to the year 1328, but the old stave church may have been built between the years 1150 and 1200. That church was located slightly to the west of the present church site (where the road is located today). There is an old clay baptismal font in the church dating back to Catholic times, but it has not been used in over 400 years. In the early 1800s, the old church was painted red. Over time, the old stave church had fallen into disrepair and was in poor condition.

In 1828, the old church was torn down and a new church was built slightly east of the old church site. The builder was Leg Askildsen Hallingskaar from Laudal, who was using plans drawn up by the architect Lars Larsen Forsæth. These were plans that had been used for the Klæbu Church near Trondheim. The new building was consecrated on 22 June 1828 by the local provost, Paul Brodahl Larsen, who was based at Evje Church. Hallingskaar carved his name into a brand new baptismal font which he gifted to the church.

After the church was built, there was some unhappiness with the roofline and steeple. It was said that the steeple tower was skewed because the original builder did not follow the plans correctly. So, the parish hired Anders Thorsen Syrtveit to rebuild those parts of the church. This church was used as a model church, and after it was built, there were ten more octagonal churches built in the Setesdalen valley and inner parts of Agder.

== Media gallery ==
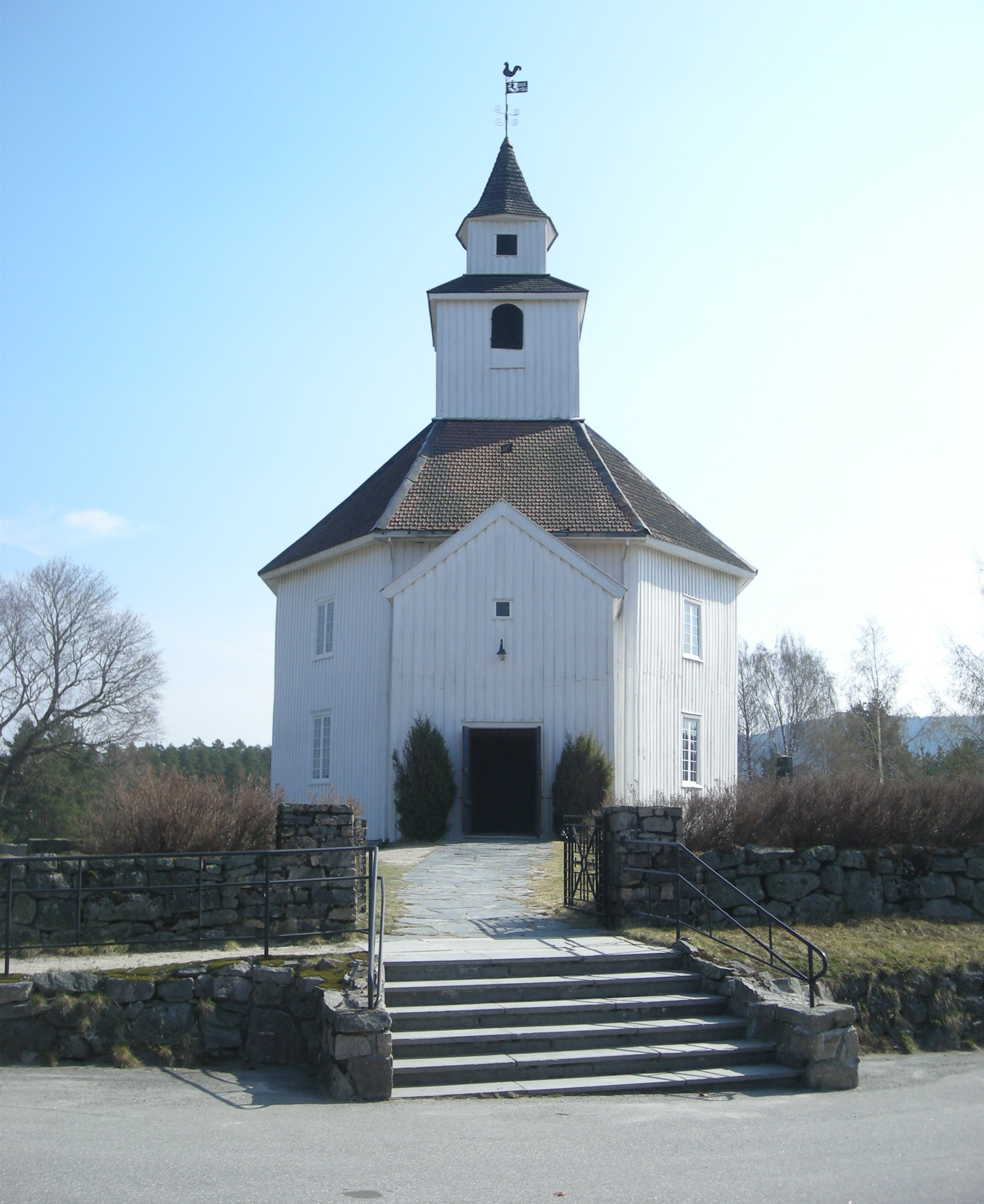

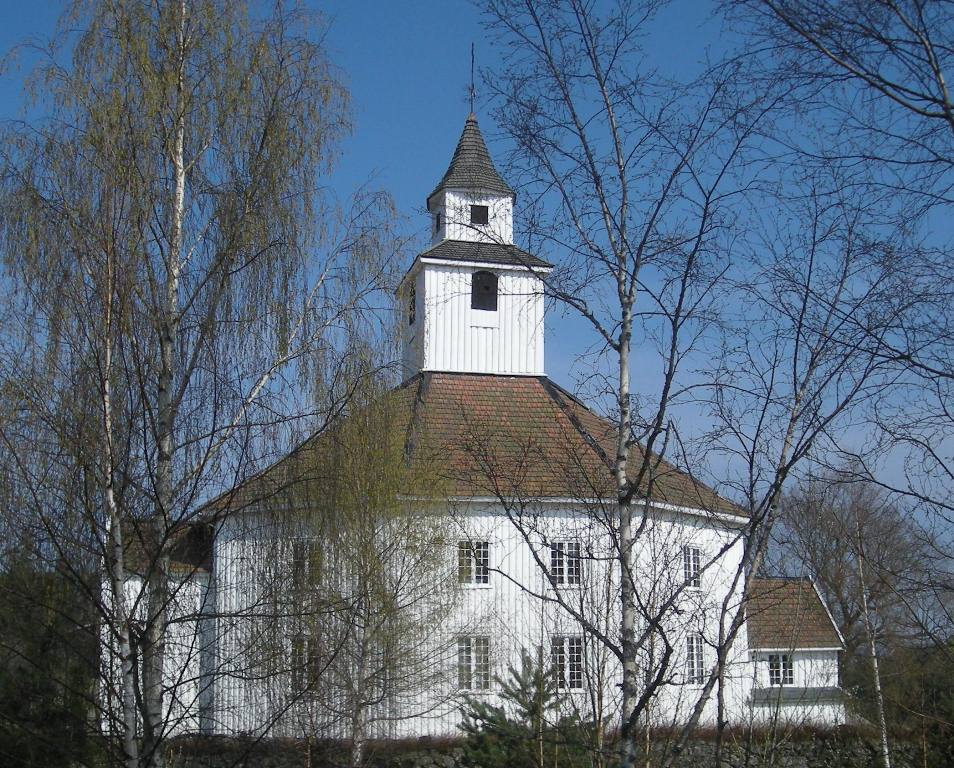

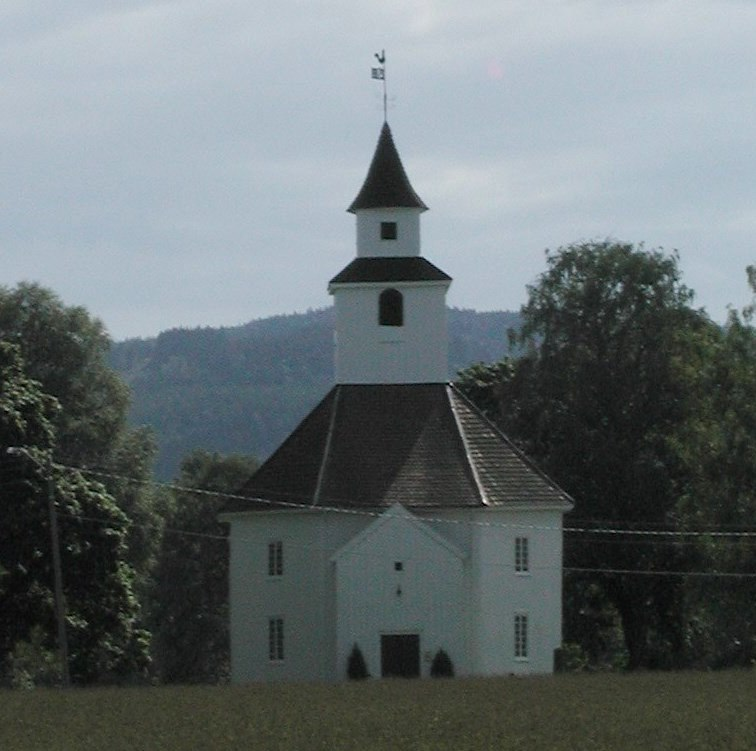

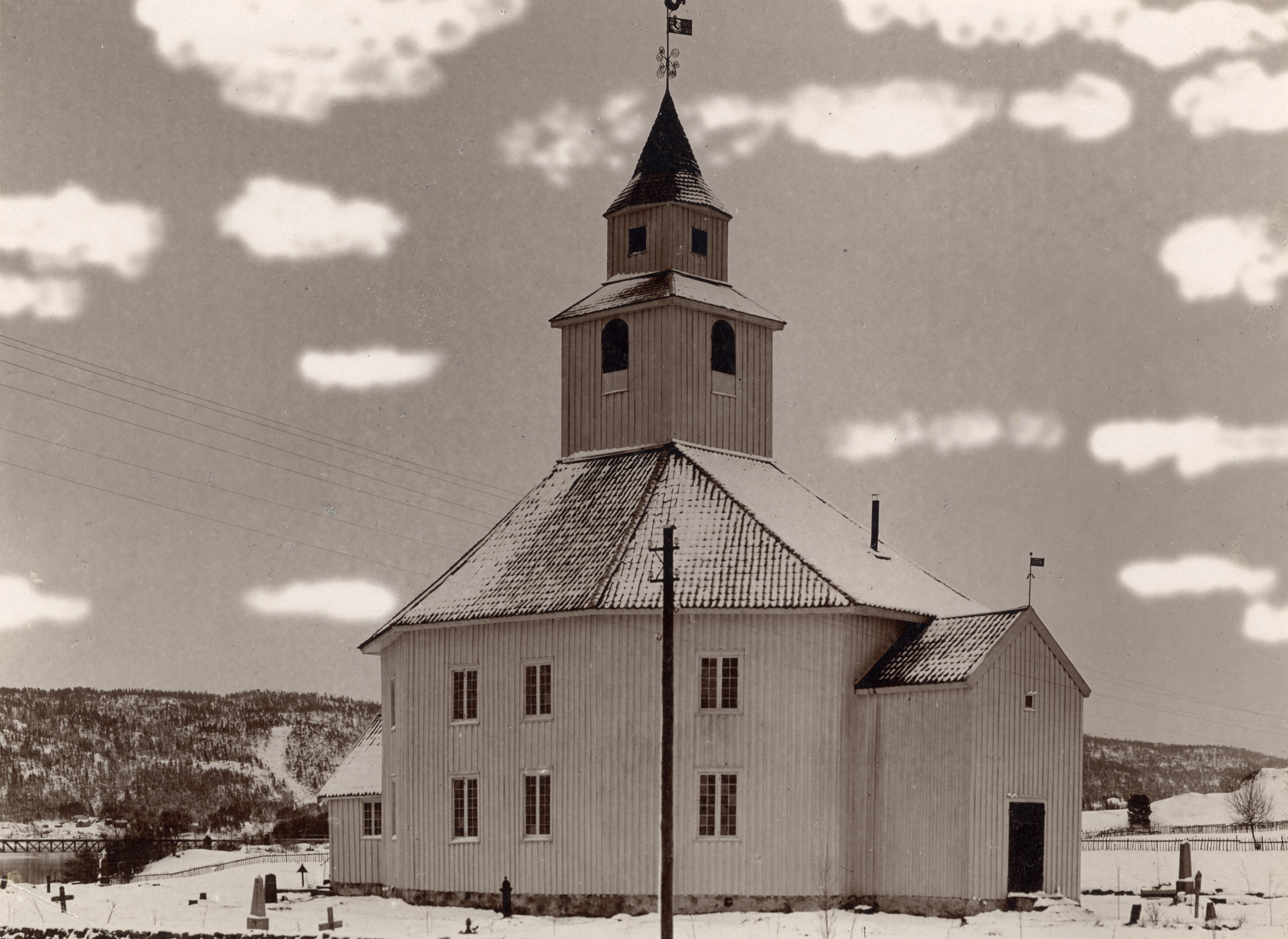

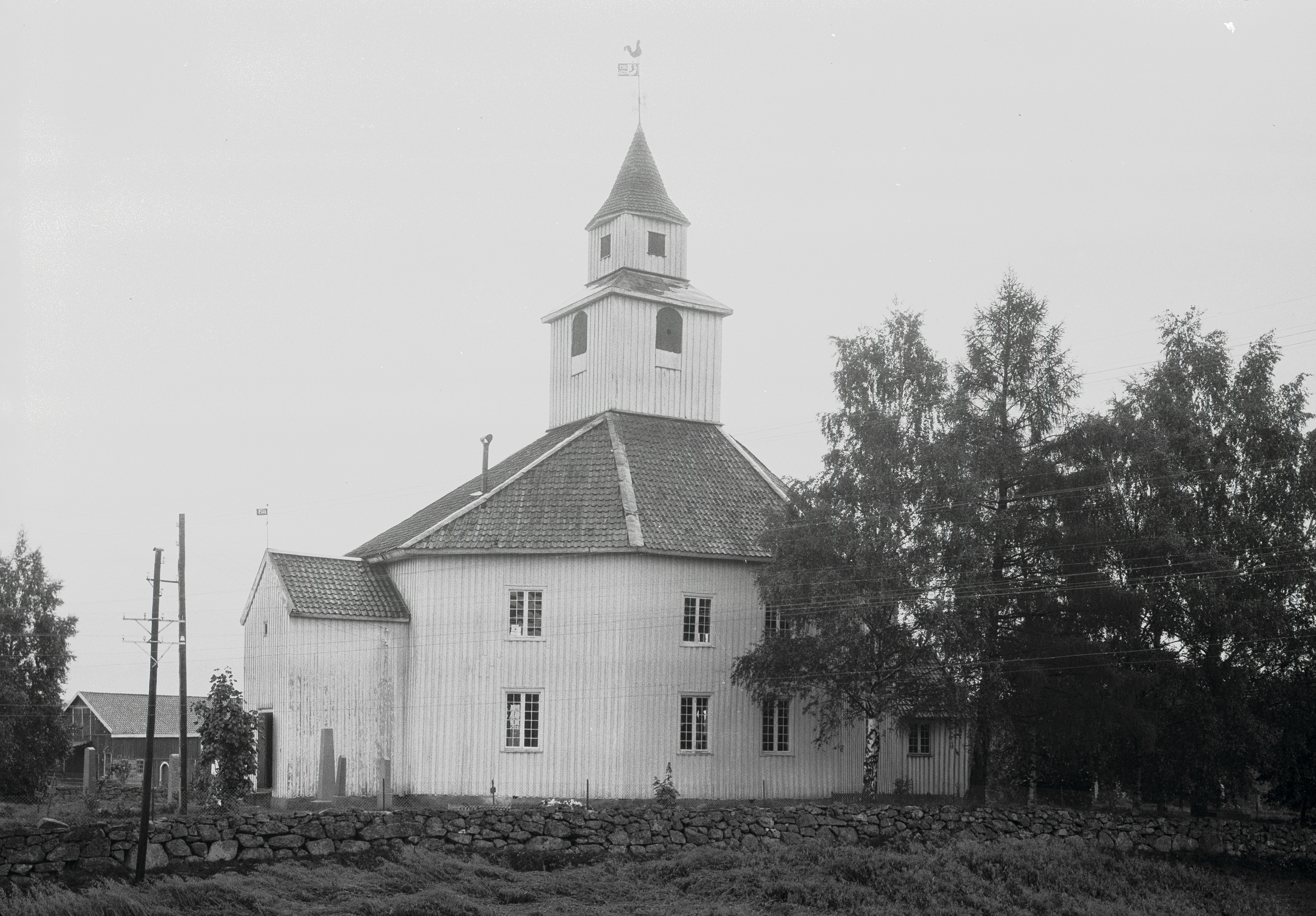

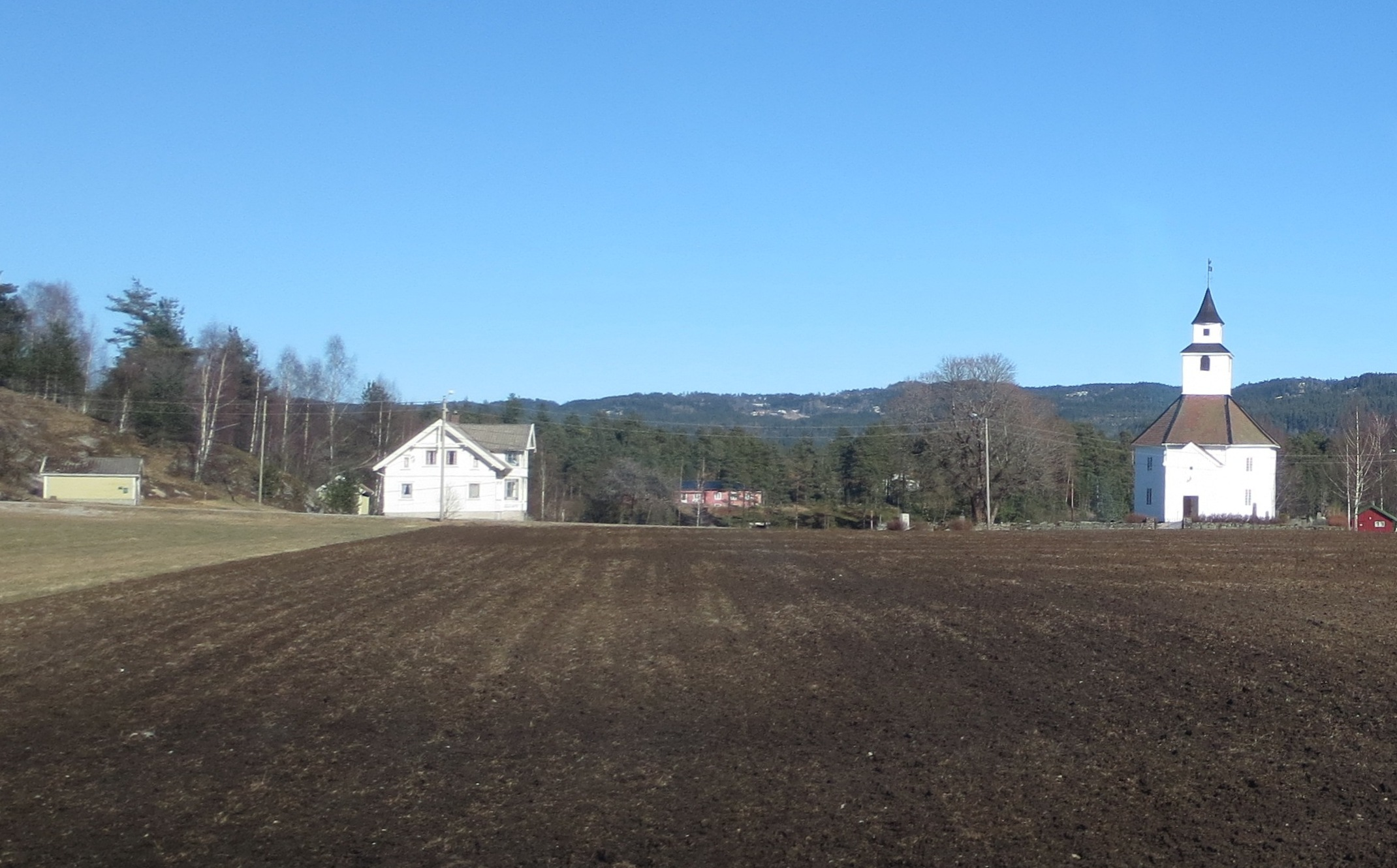

== See also ==
- List of churches in Agder og Telemark
