= Hornnes (village) =

Village in Evje og Hornnes Municipality, Norway

- Village
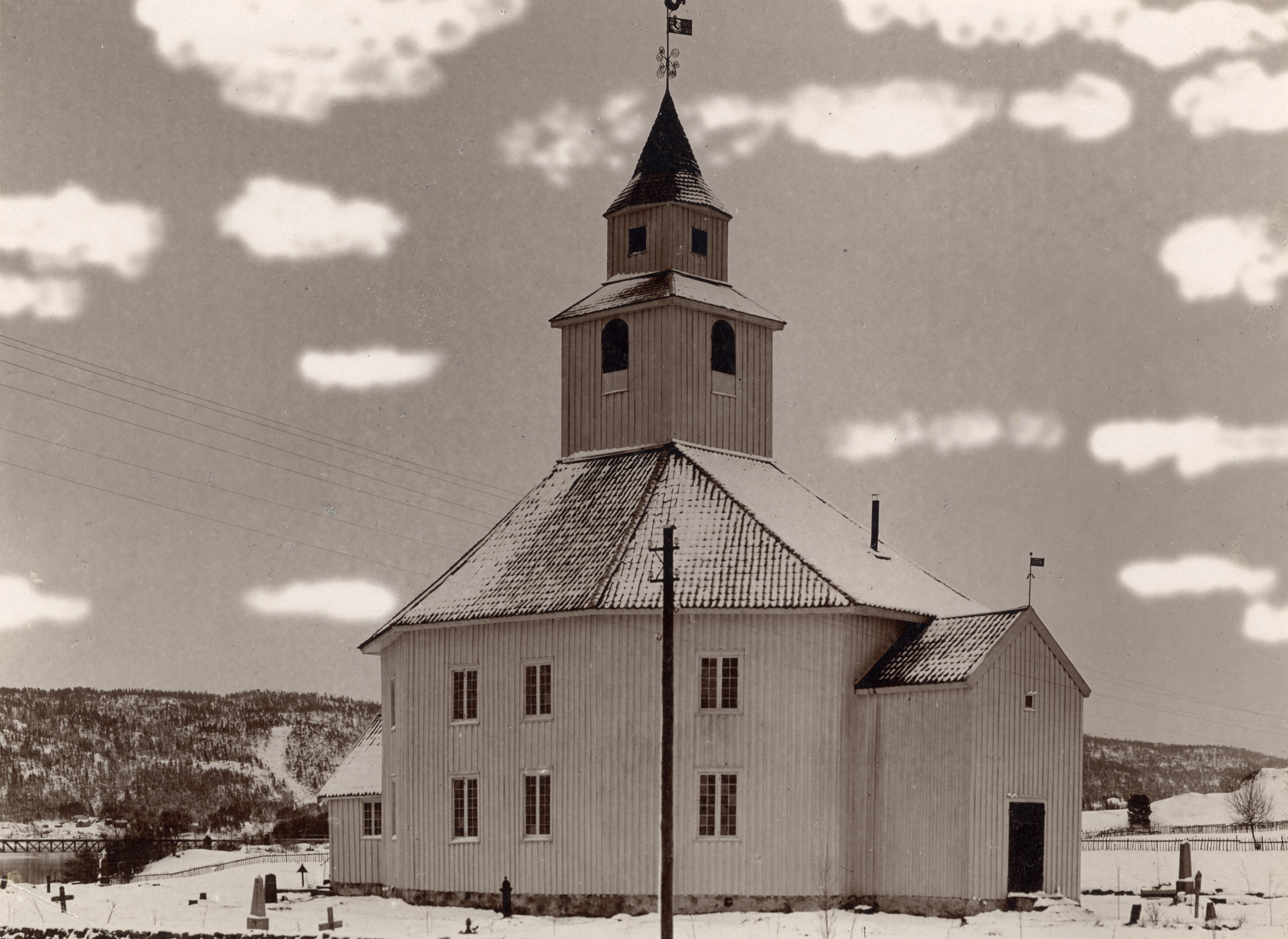
- View of the village church
- Interactive map of Hornnes
- Coordinates: 58.5531°N 07.7717°E
- Country: Norway
- Region: Southern Norway
- County: Agder
- District: Setesdal
- Municipality: Evje og Hornnes Municipality
- Elevation: 178 m (584 ft)
- Time zone: UTC+01:00 (CET)
  - Summer (DST): UTC+02:00 (CEST)
- Post Code: 4737 Hornnes

Hornnes is a village area in Evje og Hornnes Municipality in Agder county, Norway. The village is located within the urban area of Evje, along the river Otra and the Norwegian National Road 9. The village was once separate from Evje, but over the years they have grown together through conurbation. The Hornnes Church is located on the south end of the village near the lake Breidflå (part of the river Otra). The village of Kjetså lies just south of Hornnes and the village of Moi lies about 5 kilometres (3.1 mi) south of Hornnes.

== History ==
The village of Hornnes was the administrative centre of the old Hornnes og Iveland Municipality (1838-1886) and of Hornnes Municipality (1886-1960). The village grew up on the west shore of the river Otra, at the confluence with the river Dåselva. The village of Evje grew up on the opposite side of the river, about 5 kilometres (3.1 mi) to the northeast and it was the administrative centre of a separate municipality: Evje Municipality. Today, they are part of the same municipality and the villages have grown together.

=== Name ===
The village of Hornnes is named after an old Hornnes farm (Old Norse: Hornnes), since the first Hornnes Church was built there. The first element is horn which means "horn" and the last element is nes which means "headland". So the meaning of Hornnes is "the headland shaped like a horn", probably referring to the small peninsulas on either side of the river Otra as it enters the lake Breidflå.
