= Otra =

River in Agder, Norway

Otra Torridalselva Otri
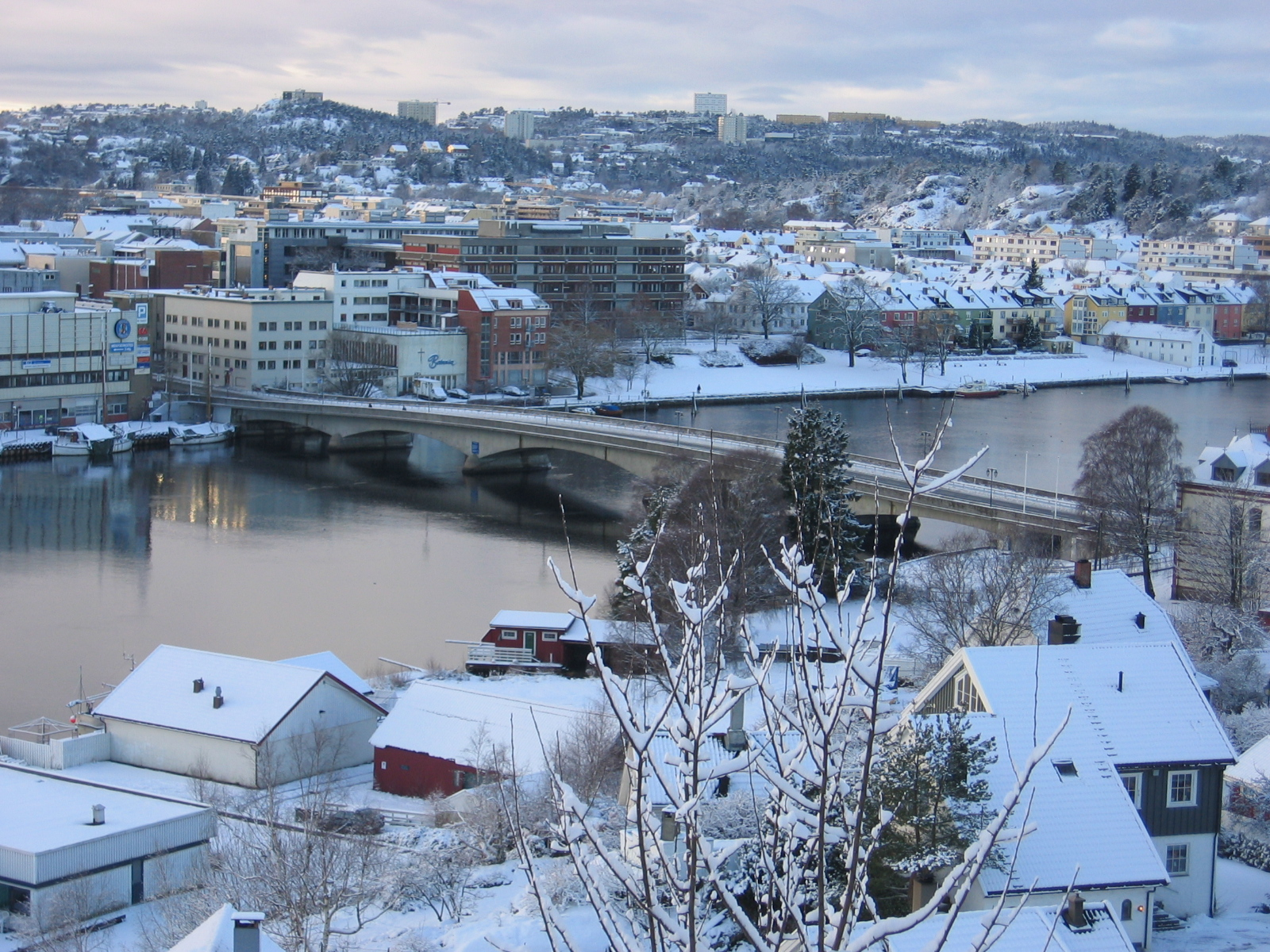
- View of the river Otra running through the city of Kristiansand, where it is also called Torridalselva or Torridalselven
- Interactive map of the river (the gap in the middle is the large lake Byglandsfjorden)

Location
- Country: Norway
- County: Agder
- Municipalities: Bykle, Valle, Bygland, Evje og Hornnes, Iveland, Vennesla, Kristiansand

Physical characteristics
- Source
  - location: Setesdalsheiene, Bykle Municipality, Norway
  - coordinates: 59.6284°N 07.4321°E
  - elevation: 896 metres (2,940 ft)
- Mouth
  - location: Skagerrak, Kristiansand Municipality, Norway
  - coordinates: 58.1434°N 08.0134°E
  - elevation: 0 metres (0 ft)
- Length: 245 km (152 mi)
- Basin size: 3,752 km^{2} (1,449 sq mi)
- Discharge
  - average: 150 m^{3}/s (5,300 cu ft/s)

Basin features
- River system: Otra

The Otra is the largest river in the Sørlandet region of Norway. It begins in Setesdalsheiene mountains at the lake Breidvatnet in Bykle Municipality in Agder county, just south of the border with Vinje Municipality in Telemark county. The river then flows south through Bykle, Valle, Bygland, Evje og Hornnes, Iveland, Vennesla, and Kristiansand municipalities. The river empties into the Skagerrak in the center of the city of Kristiansand on the southern coast of Norway.

The Otra is 245 kilometres (152 mi) long, making it Norway's eighth-longest river. There are many large lakes along the river including: Åraksfjorden, Byglandsfjorden, Hartevatn, and Kilefjorden. There are 12 hydroelectric power plants built along the river, which produce much of the electricity for the southern part of Norway.

The salmon do well in the Otra river because the water is not too acidic. The calcareous rocks in the catchment area at the northern end of the Setesdal valley give the water a certain buffer capacity against acidification.
