= Setesdal =

Valley in Agder, Norway

- District
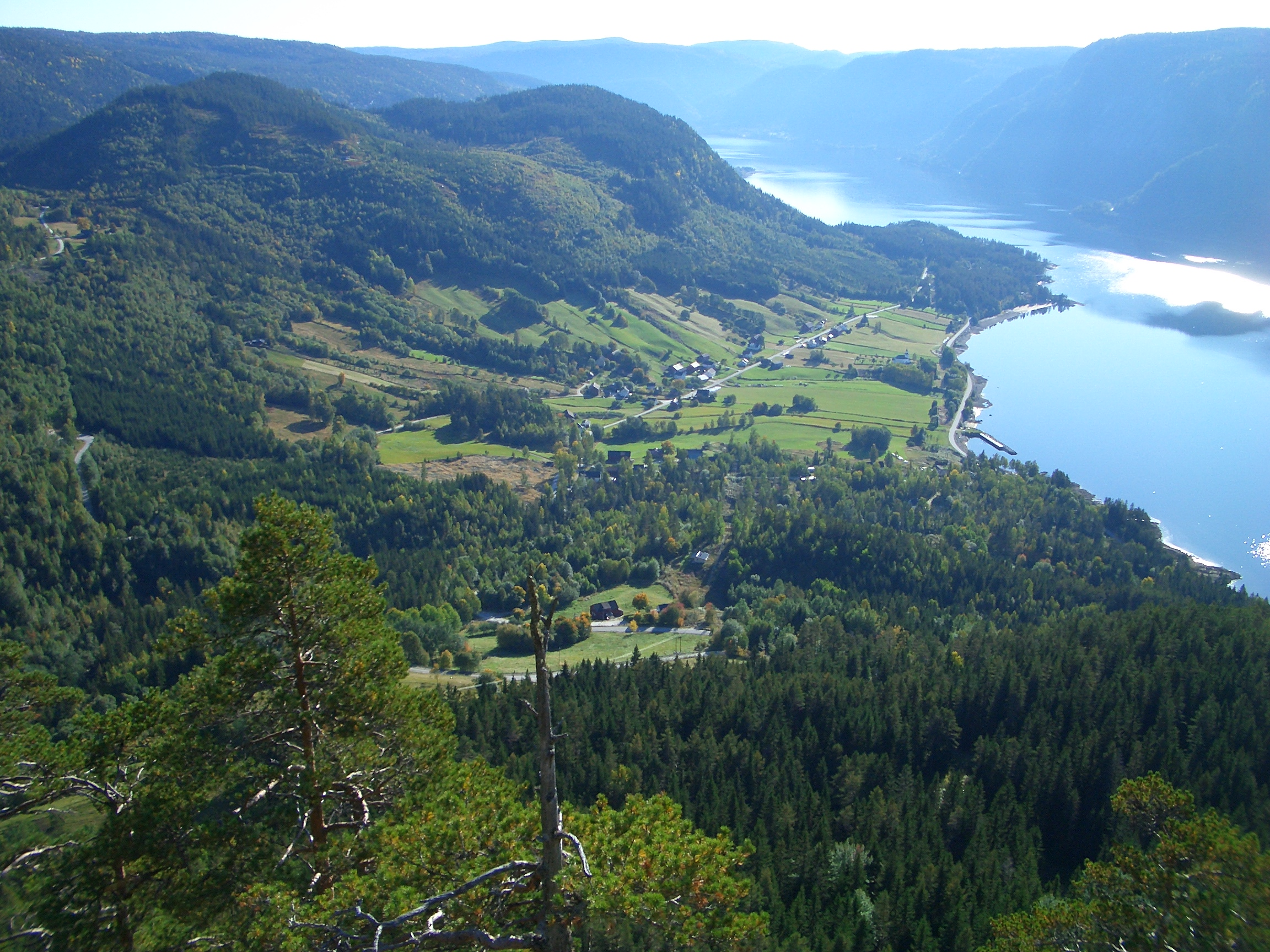
- Åraksbø in Setesdal with the Byglandsfjorden to the right (September 2008). Credit: Olav Haugetveit

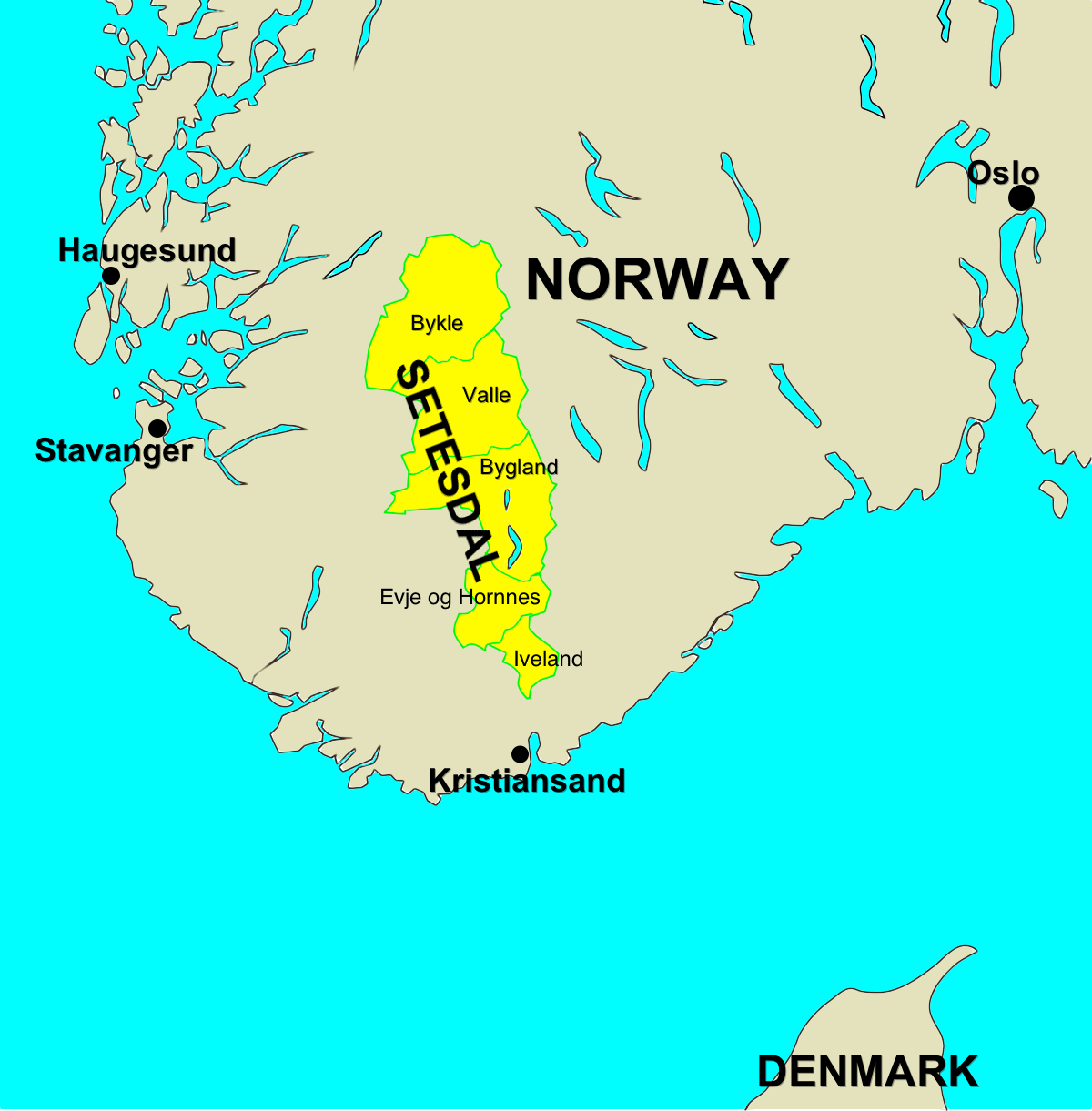
- Setesdal is north of Kristiansand
- Coordinates: 59.27261°N 7.4654°E
- Country: Norway
- County: Agder
- Region: Southern Norway
- Urban Center: Evje

Area
  - Total: 4,893 km^{2} (1,889 sq mi)

Population (2025)
  - Total: 8,633
  - Density: 1.764/km^{2} (4.570/sq mi)
- Demonym: Setesdøl

Setesdal (Urban East Norwegian: [ˈsêːtəsdɑːɫ]; older spelling: Sætersdal) is a valley and a traditional district in Agder County in southern Norway. It includes the upper parts of the Otra river valley including Bykle Municipality, Valle Municipality, Bygland Municipality, Evje og Hornnes Municipality, and Iveland Municipality.

The Otra river flows through the Setesdal valley into the sea near the city of Kristiansand. It flows southward from the Hardangervidda plateau in Telemark county. The historic Setesdal region starts at Evje and extends as far as the farm Bjåen, at the edge of the traditional region of Telemark. Øvre Setesdal (lit. 'Upper Setesdal') typically refers to the area of Bykle Municipality and Valle Municipality. Nedre Setesdal (lit. 'Lower Setesdal') includes the southern municipalities of Bygland Municipality, Evje og Hornnes Municipality, and Iveland Municipality. The Norwegian National Road 9 runs through the whole Setesdal valley.

== History ==
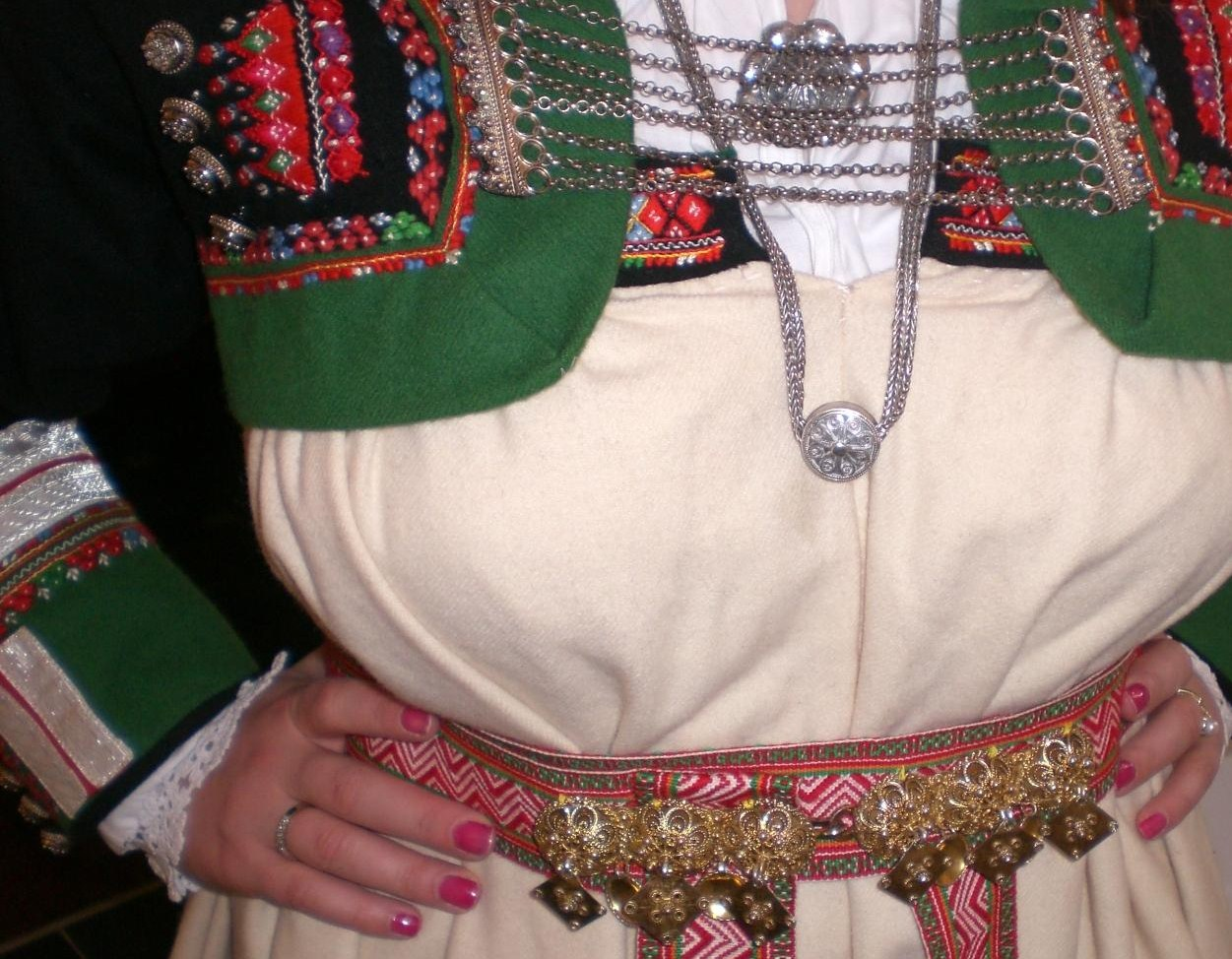
Traditional Silver Jewelry used in addition to the Setesdalsbunad

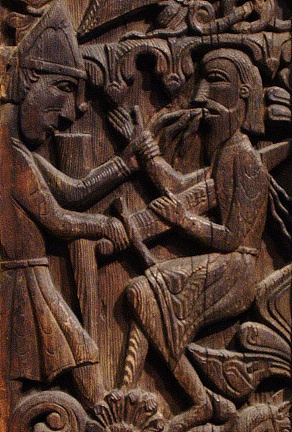
Sigurd Fåvnesbane featured on the portal plank from Hylestad Stave Church

The Historia Norwegiæ, a short history of Norway written by a monk in the second half of the 12th century, reports that Setesdal was then part of the law district "Telemark with Råbyggelag". A Raabygger or Råbygger is one who lives in a corner; this is an apt description for the valley of Setesdal, which runs like a wedge into the heights of the Haukelifjell mountains.

Ascending the Otra valley from Evje, one reaches Byglandsfjorden (a large lake on the river Otra). At this point one historically found one of the more pronounced cultural transitions in Norway; there was a radical change in racial characteristics, dress (folk costumes or Bunad), architecture, dialect, folk music, dance (e.g., the ganger, a form of Bygdedans), customs, and cuisine. Particularly obvious north of the mountain pass of Byklestigen, the people of upper Setesdal were observed to be more closely related in blood and speech to their eastern neighbours in Telemark, as well as their immediate neighbours in adjoining districts of Rogaland to the west than to those people down the valley.

Between Valle Municipality in Setesdal on the western side of the mountains and Fyresdal Municipality on the eastern side, one finds a medieval trail that priests and bishops used to get between the counties of Agder and Telemark. This trail is named "The Bishop's Road"(Bispevegen) and every year a march called "The Bishop's Road March" (Bispevegmarsjen) starts at Kleivgrend in Fyresdal Municipality.

The Hylestad Stave Church, constructed in the 13th century in Setesdal, was demolished in the 17th century. Its portal, with several carved scenes illustrating the legend of Sigurd Fåvnesbane (lit. 'Sigurd the Dragon-slayer'), is on display at the University Museum of National Antiquities in Oslo (Universitetets Oldsaksamling, Historisk Museum, Oslo). Sigurd's slaying of Fafnir is described in the Prose Edda of Snorri Sturluson and the Völsungasaga, both from the 13th century, as well as alluded to in Beowulf and Njáls saga.

The Setesdal Line (Norwegian: Setesdalsbanen) is a railroad between Kristiansand and Byglandsfjord in southern Norway. It was opened to Hægeland in 1895, and to Byglandsfjord in 1896. This railroad was closed down in 1962 but parts of it exist today as a hobby railroad and it is in regular tourist use during the summer months.

The SS Bjoren is an old steamboat that is in regular tourist use on a lake in the river Otra called Byglandsfjorden.

=== Etymology ===
The oldest Old Norse form of the name was just Setr, and this was later replaced by Setrsdalr (lit. 'the dale/valley of Setr'). The common word setr has the meaning "homestead" or "mountain farm" and the name Setr was probably originally the name of an old, large farm in the central part of what is now Valle Municipality. The old farm was then later divided into a lot of smaller parts, but the name survived as the name of the district.

== See also ==
- Setesdalsbunad
- Setesdalsgenser (lit. 'Setesdal sweater')
- Setesdølen, the local newspaper
