= Iveland =

Iveland may refer to:

== Places ==
- Iveland Municipality, a municipality in Agder county, Norway
- Iveland, also known as Birketveit, a village in Iveland Municipality in Agder county, Norway
- Iveland Church, a church in Iveland Municipality in Agder county, Norway

== People ==
- Einar Iveland (1892–1975), a Norwegian politician for the Liberal Party
- Persi Iveland, a member of the band DumDum Boys

== Other ==
- Iveland IL, a sports club based in Iveland, Norway
