= Narrow-gauge railways in Norway =

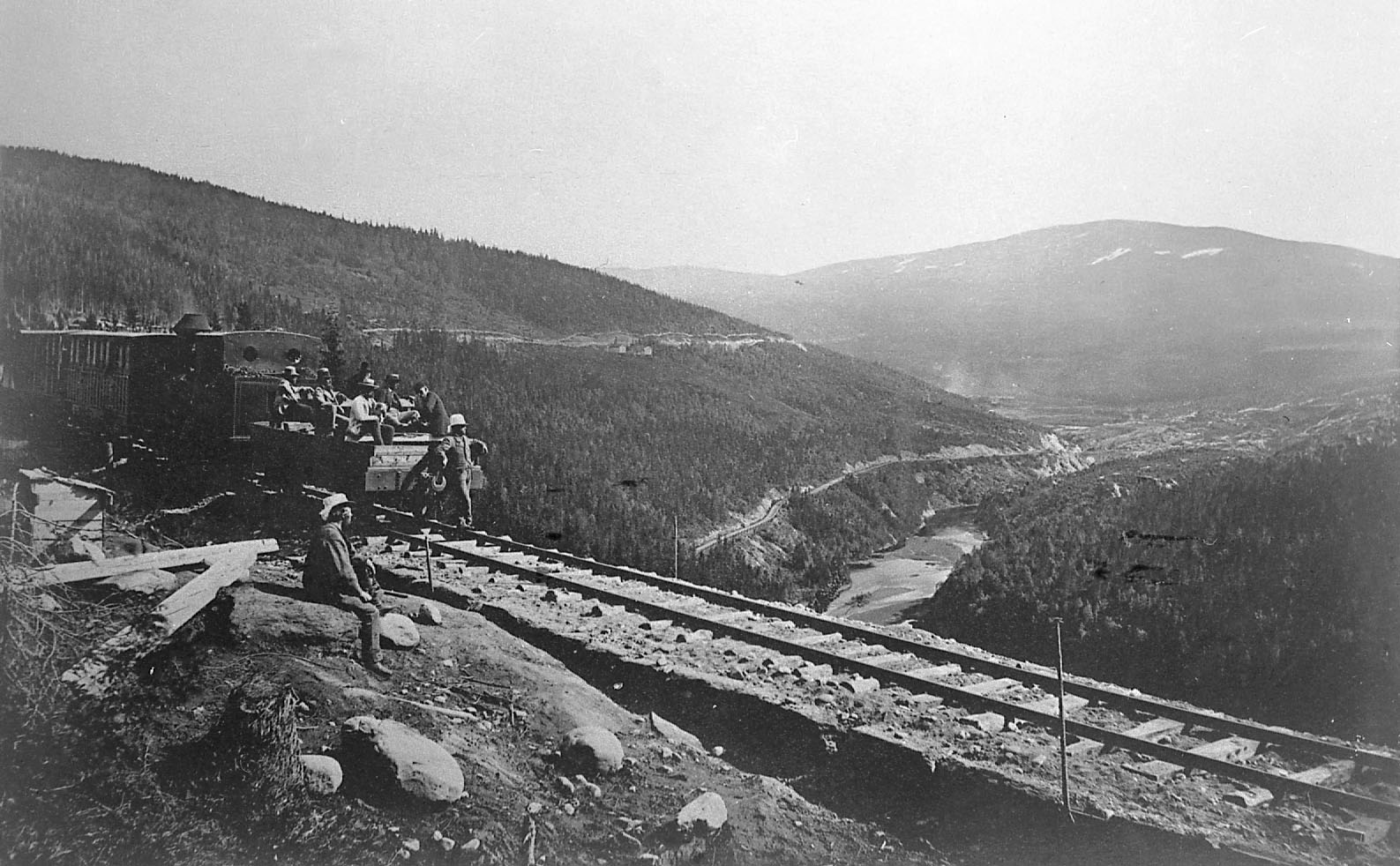
Carl Abraham Pihl and his entourage inspecting the construction of the Røros Line in 1877

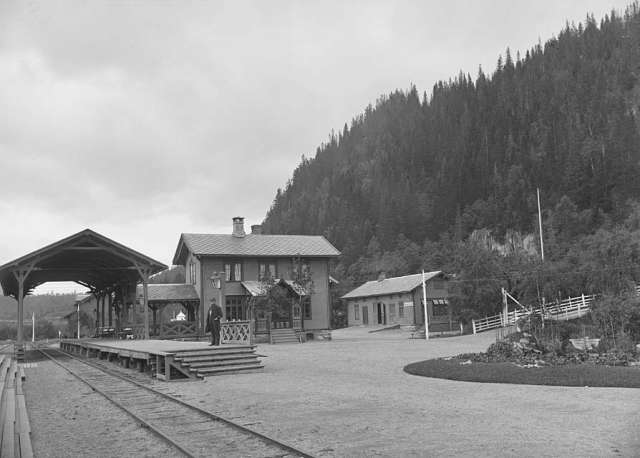
Støren Station on the Røros Line during the 1880s

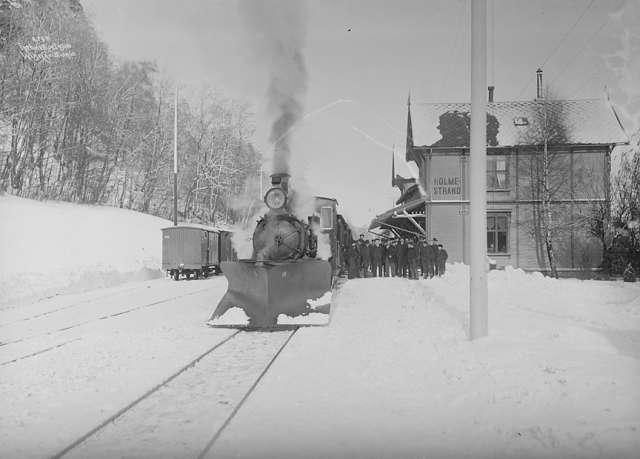
Holmestrand Station on the Vestfold Line in 1906

In Norway, a number of main lines were in the 19th century built with narrow gauge, 3 ft 6 in (1,067 mm), to save cost in a sparsely populated mountainous country. This included Norway's first own long-distance line, the Røros Line, connecting Oslo and Trondheim, 1877. Some secondary railways also had this gauge. These railways have been rebuilt to standard gauge or closed down. Some private railways had 750 mm (2 ft 5 1/2 in) and one had 1,000 mm (3 ft 3 3/8 in). A few railways partly still are operated as museum railways, specifically the Thamshavn Line, Urskog–Høland Line and the Setesdal Line. The Trondheim Tramway is also narrow gauge.

== List of narrow-gauge lines ==
Line	Length	Opened	Gauge	Converted	Notes
Ålgård Line	12 km (7.5 mi)	1921	1,067 mm (3 ft 6 in)	1944	Branch of the Sørlandet Line
Brevik Line	10 km (6.2 mi)	1895	1,067 mm (3 ft 6 in)	1921	Branch of the Vestfold Line
Drammen Line	52 km (32 mi)	1872	1,067 mm (3 ft 6 in)	1922	
Flekkefjord Line	17 km (11 mi)	1904	1,067 mm (3 ft 6 in)	1941	Closed in 1989
Grimstad Line	22 km (14 mi)	1907	1,067 mm (3 ft 6 in)	1936	Closed in 1961
Hokksund–Kongsberg	87 km (54 mi)	1871	1,067 mm (3 ft 6 in)	1909	Since renamed to the Sørlandet Line
Holmestrand–Vittingfoss Line	30 km (19 mi)	1902	1,067 mm (3 ft 6 in)	—	Closed in 1938
Horten Line	7 km (4.3 mi)	1881	1,067 mm (3 ft 6 in)	1949	Branch of the Vestfold Line
Jæren Line	74 km (46 mi)	1878	1,067 mm (3 ft 6 in)	1944	Since 1944 part of the Sørlandet Line
Krøderen Line	26 km (16 mi)	1872	1,067 mm (3 ft 6 in)	1909	Closed in 1985, now a heritage railway
Lier Line	21 km (13 mi)	1904	1,067 mm (3 ft 6 in)	—	Closed in 1937
Lillesand–Flaksvand Line	17 km (11 mi)	1896	1,067 mm (3 ft 6 in)	—	Closed in 1953
Nesttun–Os Line	24 km (15 mi)	1894	750 mm (2 ft 5 1/2 in)	—	Closed in 1935
Randsfjorden Line	87 km (54 mi)	1866	1,067 mm (3 ft 6 in)	1909	
Røros Line	383 km (238 mi)	1862	1,067 mm (3 ft 6 in)	1941	Converted in stages
Setesdal Line	78 km (48 mi)	1895	1,067 mm (3 ft 6 in)	—	Closed in 1962. Opened as a heritage railway (first section) in 1966. Now runs on the preserved scenic 8 kilometres (5.0 mi) stretch Grovane-Røyknes
Sulitjelma Line	36 km (22 mi)	1892	750 mm (2 ft 5 1/2 in)	1915	Built with 750 mm (2 ft 5 1/2 in) gauge, converted to 1,067 mm (3 ft 6 in) gauge, closed in 1972
Thamshavn Line	25 km (16 mi)	1908	1,000 mm (3 ft 3 3/8 in)	—	Electric. Closed in 1974, now a heritage railway
Tønsberg–Eidsfoss Line	84 km (52 mi)	1901	1,067 mm (3 ft 6 in)	—	Closed in 1938
Trondhjem–Støren Line	51 km (32 mi)	1864	1,067 mm (3 ft 6 in)	1921	Since 1877 part of the Røros Line and since 1921 part of the Dovre Line
Urskog–Høland Line	57 km (35 mi)	1896	750 mm (2 ft 5 1/2 in)	—	Closed in 1960. Opened in 1966 as a heritage railway
Vestfold Line	148 km (92 mi)	1881	1,067 mm (3 ft 6 in)	1949	
Voss Line	106 km (66 mi)	1883	1,067 mm (3 ft 6 in)	1909	Since 1909 part of the Bergen Line
