= Kilefjorden =

Lake in Agder, Norway

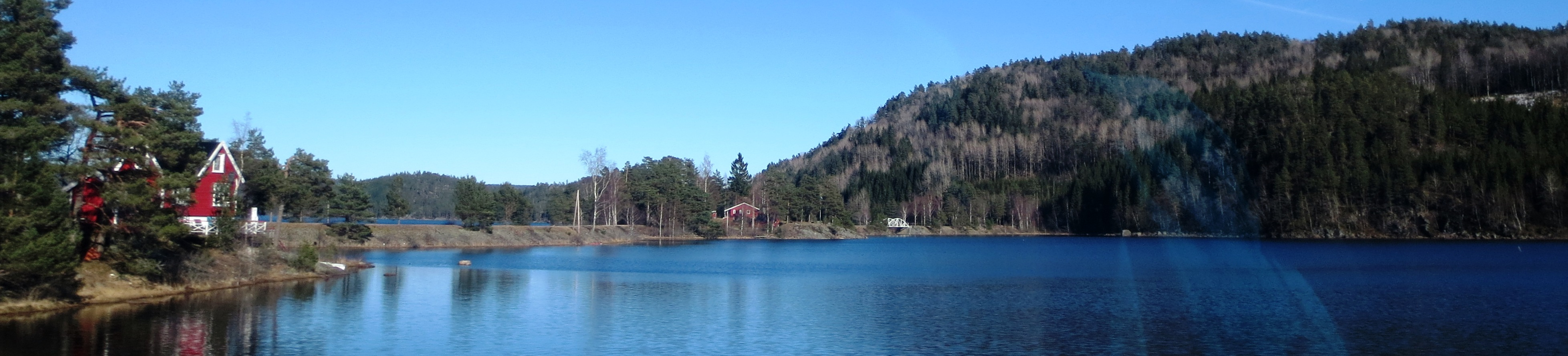
- View of the lake in Vennesla
- Interactive map of Kilefjorden
- Location: Agder county
- Coordinates: 58.4231°N 7.79798°E
- Primary inflows: Otra river
- Primary outflows: Otra river
- Catchment area: Otra watershed
- Basin countries: Norway
- Max. length: 9.5 kilometres (5.9 mi)
- Max. width: 0.5–1.5 kilometres (0.31–0.93 mi)
- Surface area: 7.22 km^{2} (2.79 sq mi)
- Shore length^{1}: 65 kilometres (40 mi)
- Surface elevation: 32 metres (105 ft)
- References: NVE
- ^{1} Shore length is not a well-defined measure.

Kilefjorden is a lake on in Agder county, Norway. The lake is located on the border of Evje og Hornnes Municipality (in the north), Iveland Municipality (in the east), and Vennesla Municipality (in the west). The lake is part of the river Otra. It is located about 6 kilometres (3.7 mi) west of the village of Birketveit in Iveland Municipality, about 2.5 kilometres (1.6 mi) north of the village of Hægeland in Vennesla Municipality, and about 15 kilometres (9.3 mi) south of the village of Hornnes in Evje og Hornnes Municipality.

== History ==
The steamship Bjoren worked in this lake from 1866–1896 transporting people and items across the lake. In 1896, the boat was moved to the Byglandsfjorden. The Norwegian National Road 9 runs along the southwestern end of the lake.

Prior to 1950, the lake's outflow was at the waterfall Soga on the southeast end of the lake. In 1950, the Gåseflå dam was built further upstream creating the lake Gåseflåfjorden which adjoins the Kilefjorden at the same surface elevation so the waterfall is now underwater and it can only be seen when the lake Gåseflå is lowered for work on the power station.

== Media gallery ==
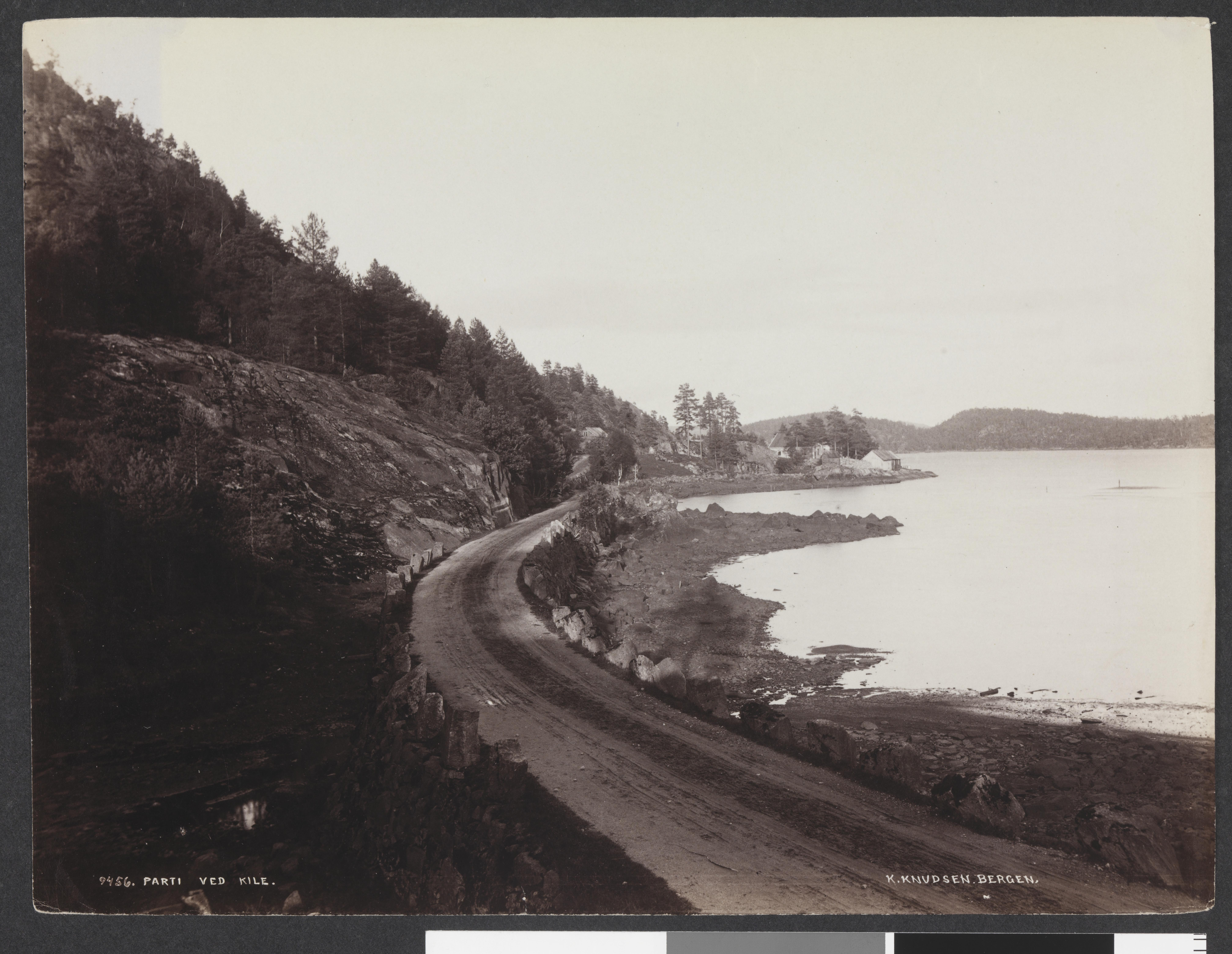
View of the lake in the late 1800s

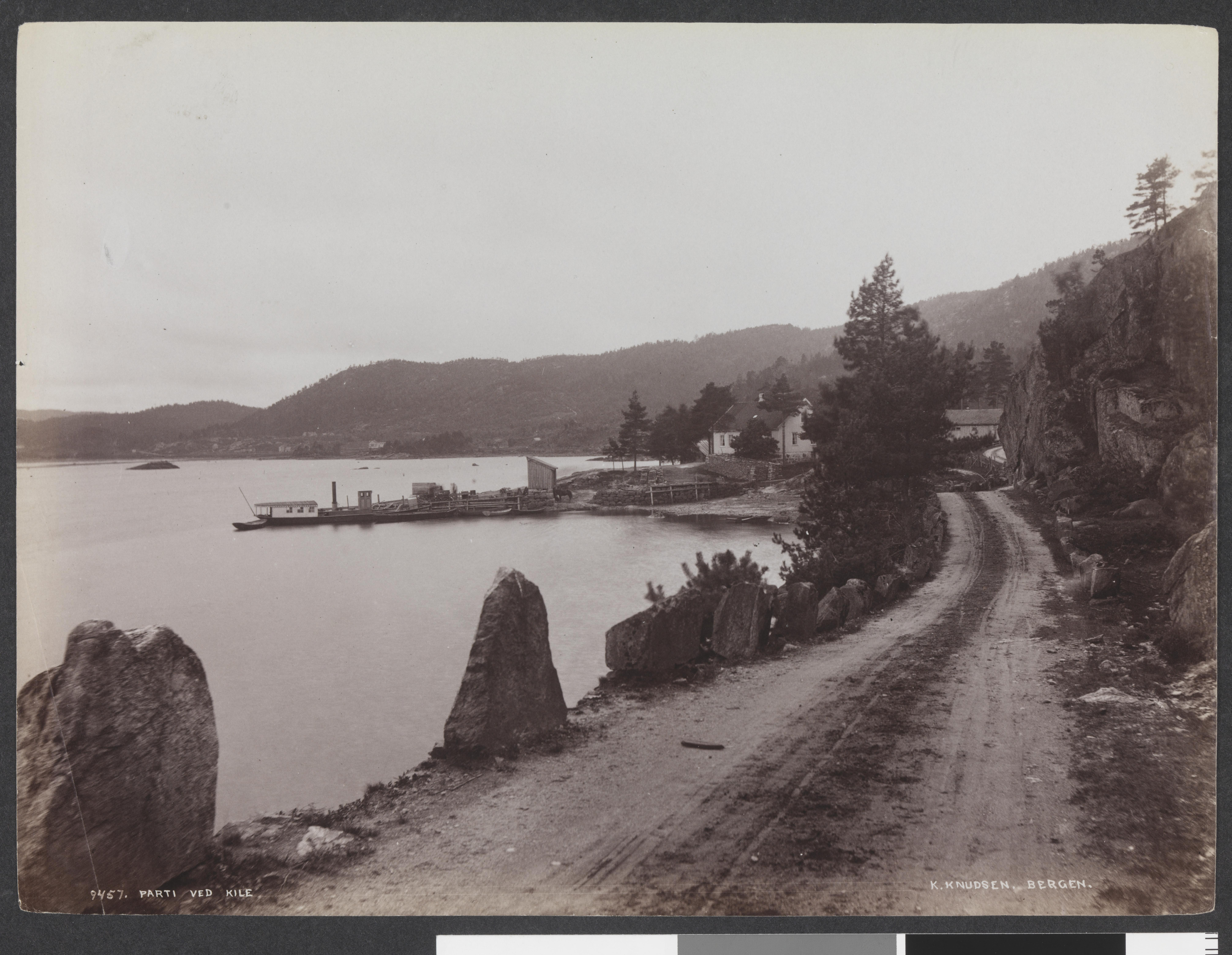
View of the lake in the late 1800s

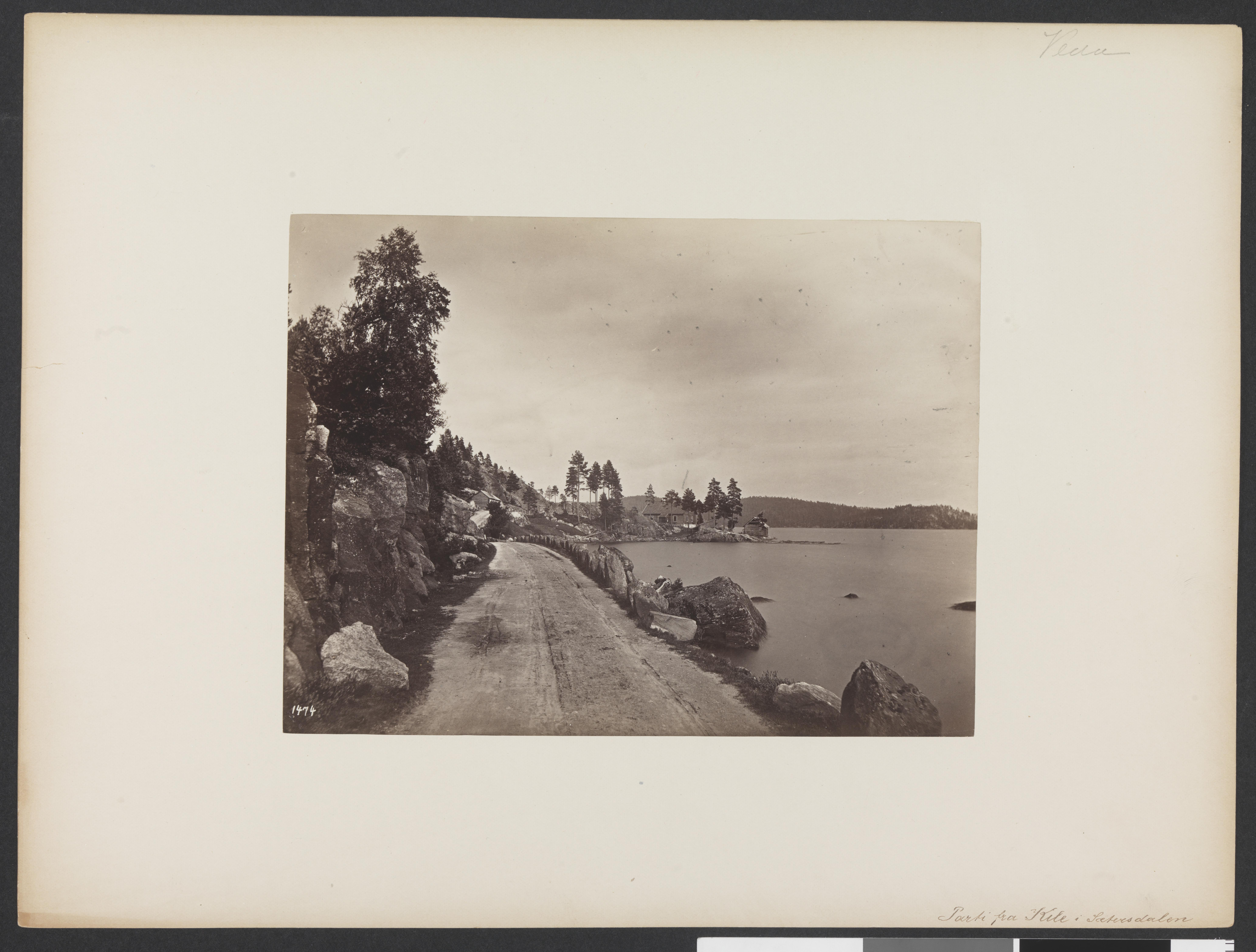
View of the lake between 1864 and 1889

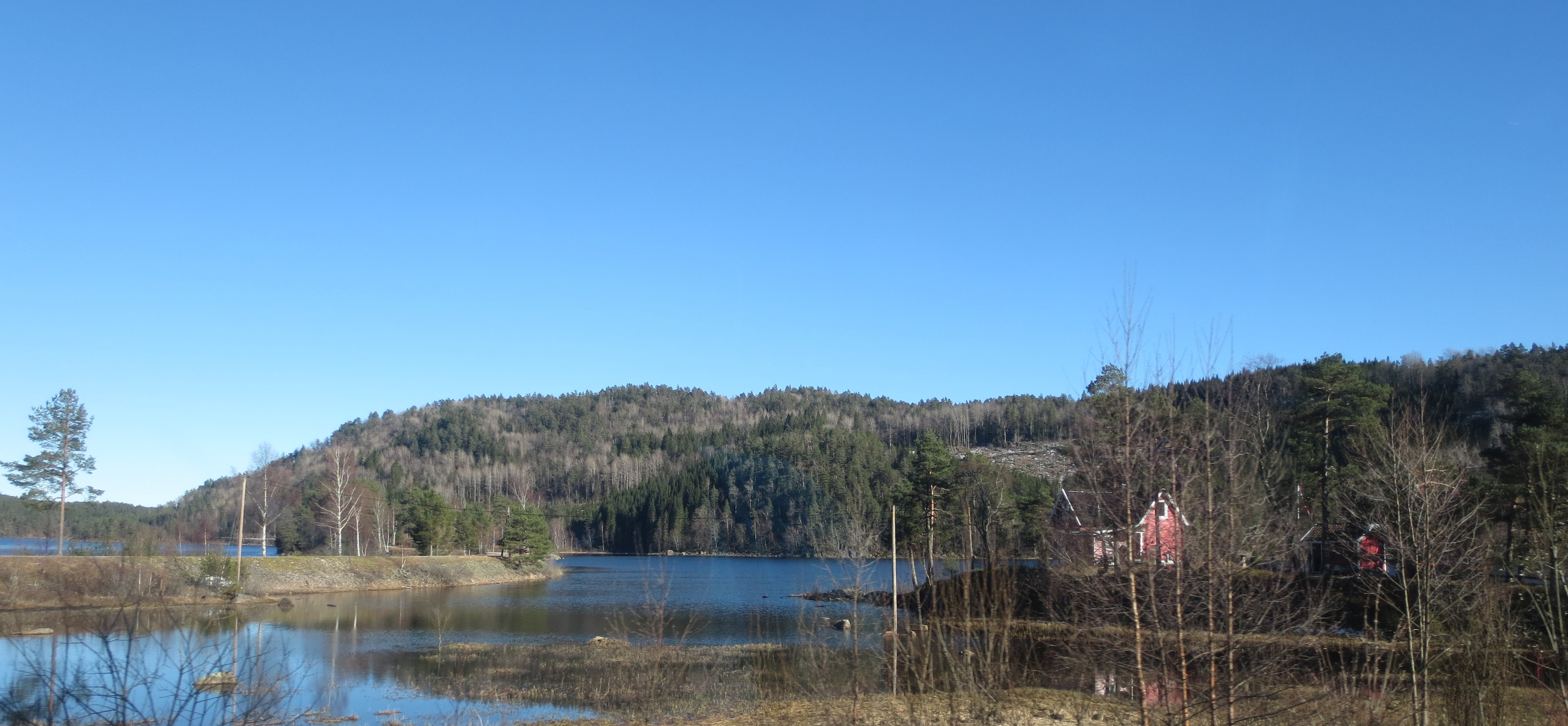
View along the Rv9 highway

== See also ==
- List of lakes in Aust-Agder
- List of lakes in Norway
