= Lillesand–Flaksvand Line =

Narrow-gauge railway line

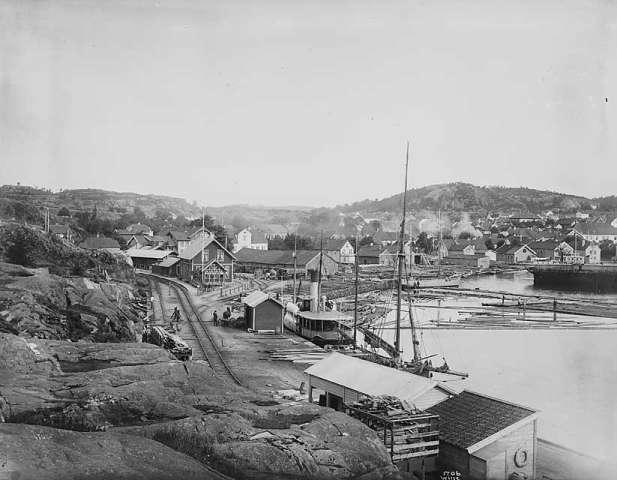
- Lillesand Station in 1902

Overview
- Native name: Lillesand–Flaksvandbanen
- Status: Abandoned
- Owner: A/S Lillesand–Flaksvandbanen
- Termini: Lillesand; Flaksvand

Service
- Type: Railway
- System: Private

History
- Opened: 4 June 1896
- Closed: 1 July 1953

Technical
- Line length: 16.59 km (10.31 mi)
- Track length: 18.15 km (11.28 mi)
- Number of tracks: Single
- Track gauge: 1,067 mm (3 ft 6 in)
- Electrification: No

The Lillesand–Flaksvand Line (Norwegian: Lillesand–Flaksvandbanen) or LFB was a 16.59-kilometer (10.31 mi) railway between Flaksvand (now called Flaksvatn) and Lillesand in Agder, Norway. The private line was built with 1,067 mm (3 ft 6 in) narrow gauge and was not connected to the national railway network. The line opened on 4 June 1896, and remained in use until 15 June 1953. It was built to carry lumber, but also featured a passenger service and other cargo transport. After 1908, the line was unprofitable and only had a limited service. Plans to connect it to the Sørland Line were proposed but rejected. The line had four stations and four halts, and was served with two 75 kilowatts (100 hp) steam locomotives, Lillesand and Flaksvand. The line was owned and operated by the private company, A/S Lillesand–Flaksvandbanen, although nearly all the shares were held by local municipalities, the county and the national government.

== Route ==
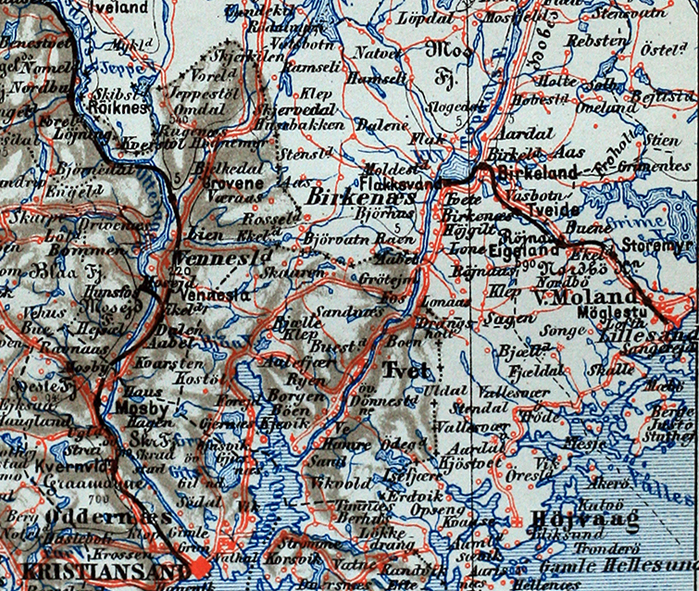
Map of the route

The 16.59-kilometer (10.31 mi) line was built at a minimum standard and as cheaply as possible. It had 1,067 mm (3 ft 6 in) narrow gauge, with the steepest gradient at 3.33 percent, a minimum curve radius of 60 meters (200 ft) and a track weight of 60 kilograms per meter (145 lb/yd). The line had four stations: Lillesand, Tveide, Birkeland and Flaksvand. In addition, there were four halts between Lillesand and Tveide: Stene, Møglustu, Storemyr and Eikeland.

In addition to the main line, there were 11 branches and spurs, totaling 1,550 metres (5,090 ft). At Lillesand Station, there was a station building, a wagon depot, a locomotive depot and tracks to the docks. At Møglestu, there was an extra parallel track and at Sandvad, there was a branch to a gravel pit. Extra tracks were laid at Storemyr for parking of wagons and at Ydderstad, there was a spur to load lumber. At Eikeland there three spurs, including one 600 metres (2,000 ft) long to a stone quarry. At Jordbruna, there was a spur for loading lumber, and at Tveite, there were three spurs, of which two went to the sand pit at Moelva and one to Myhre Torvstrøfabrikk. North of Tveite, there was a spur to leave part of the train if the locomotive needed to take two trips to get up the hill. At Birkeland Station, there were two extra tracks, one for stationing cargo trains and one to the sawmill. At Flaksvand Station, there were five tracks, of which three were at the station, one to the sawmill and for loading lumber.

In Lillesand, the right-of-way has been converted to a road around the city center, although parts have been converted to a pedestrian path. Other parts have been reverted to agricultural land. From Storemyr, the route went through a forest, and has become an overgrown forestry road. From Eikeland to Tveite, the line has been converted to a hiking trail. At Birkleland, there are few remains of the line, although when leaving the village, part of the line is used as a pathway. Further along, the route is disused, but fenced in. The station buildings at Tveite and Flaksvand have been kept, the building at Lillesand has been preserved, while the station at Birkeland was dismounted because it was in the way of a new road.

== History ==
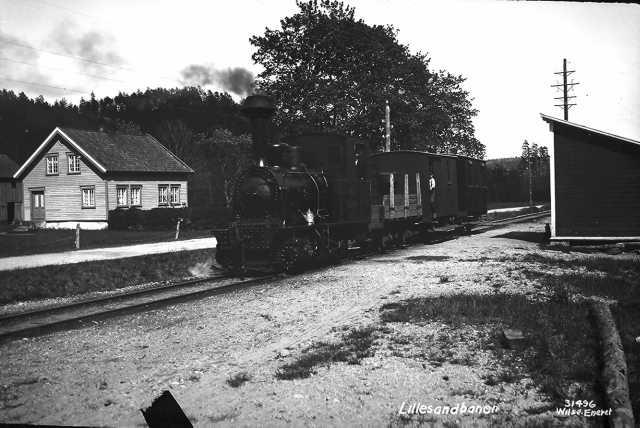
Steam locomotive in Lillesand in 1927

Public debate about constructing a railway from Lillesand up the valley following the river Tovdalselva started in the mid-1880s. At the time, lumber was being floated down the river, but low levels of water was causing irregular operations and the piling of lumber in Flaksvand. In 1889, the government for received an application for a concession. Costs were estimated at NOK 462,000 and the line was passed by the Parliament of Norway on 22 June 1891. At the same time, the line received a state funding of NOK 200,000. Half of this was share capital, the other half was a subsidy. Aust-Agder County Municipality also gave a grant of NOK 20,000, and bought shares for the same amount. Of the share capital of NOK 417,350, NOK 850 was from private investors and the rest from municipalities. The largest owner was Lillesand Municipality, who bought shares for NOK 181,000. Concession was granted by royal resolution on 31 August 1892, and lasted 30 years from the date of the opening of the railway.

Construction was subcontracted to Nicolay Nicolaysen Sontum of Bergen. Without any machines, the whole line was built by hand using tools and explosives. The line opened on 4 June 1896. Two steam locomotives from Sächsische Maschinenfabrik were delivered in May 1895 and given the names Lillesand and Flaksvand. The locomotives weighed 15 tonnes (15 long tons; 17 short tons) and had a power output of 75 kilowatts (101 hp). Three passenger cars were bought along with 34 freight cars. Most of the rolling stock remained in use until the closing of the line, at which time they were scrapped. The initial service was two daily round trips, shortly afterwards increasing to three. The peak freight transport was reached in 1902, when 53,207 tonnes (52,367 long tons; 58,651 short tons) were transported. It fell rapidly, and from 1906 it was never higher than 20,000 tonnes (20,000 long tons; 22,000 short tons). Also the passenger traffic fell, with the peak reached in 1900, when the line had 26,000 passengers. In addition to lumber, an important customer was Myhre Torvstrøfabrikk, which produced peat.

By 1908, the railway was losing money, of which two-thirds was covered by the state and one-third by the municipalities. During the planning of the Sørland Line, it was proposed that the Lillesand–Flaksvand Line be converted to standard gauge and extended to Oggevatn, allowing the two lines to connect. Other proposals involved extending the line from Flaksvand to Vennesla and from Lillesand to Roresand. In 1928, the operating company, A/S Lillesand–Flaksvandbanen, started a parallel bus route. By 1930, only 845 passengers were transported by rail, with ridership falling further in the following years. By then, there was only a single, combined freight and passenger round trip per day. From 2 March 1942, this was reduced to when needed, and eventually transport was only done during summer. In 1951, the railway transported 269 passengers and 4,915 tonnes (4,837 long tons; 5,418 short tons). The last train ran on 15 June 1953, and the line was officially closed on 1 July.

== See also ==
- Narrow gauge railways in Norway
