= Byglandsfjord Station =

Railway station in Bygland, Norway

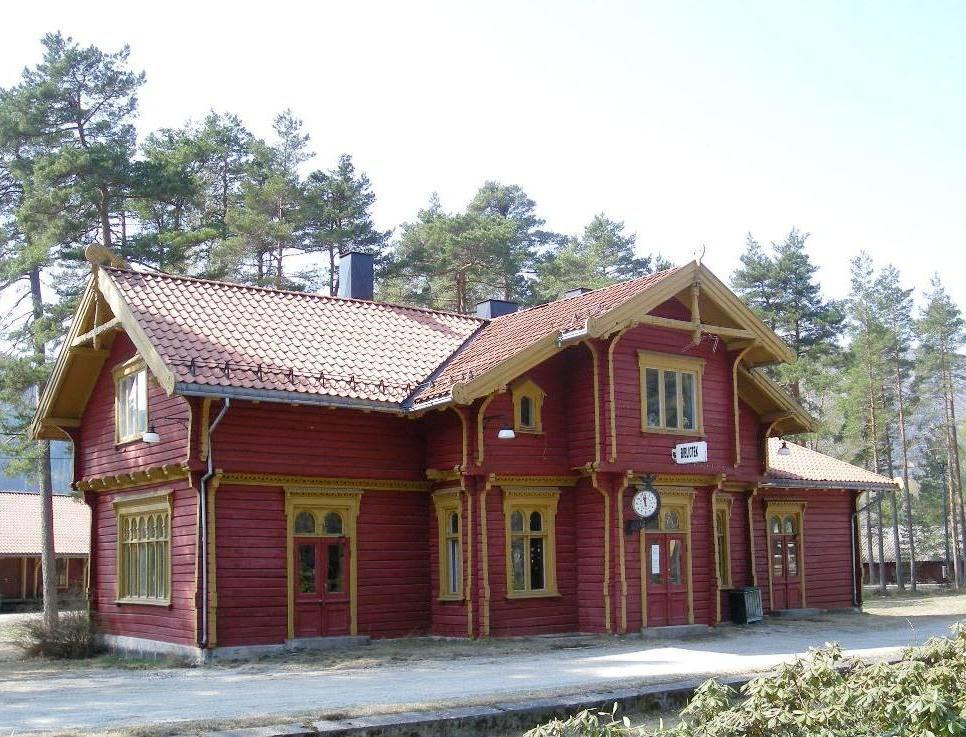
- The former station building at Byglandsfjord today houses the local public library

General information
- Location: Byglandsfjord, Bygland Municipality; Norway
- Coordinates: 58°40′1.6320″N 7°48′9.5148″E
- Line: Setesdal Line
- Connections: Steamboat on lake Byglandsfjorden

Construction
- Architect: Paul Due

History
- Opened: 1895
- Closed: 1962
Location

Byglandsfjord Station was a railway station in the village of Byglandsfjord in Bygland Municipality in Agder county, Norway. It was the terminus station for the old Setesdal Line that traveled up the Setesdal valley from Kristiansand - Grovane - Byglandsfjord until the railway line was closed in 1962. The station sits on the eastern shore of the river Otra, at the south end of the lake Byglandsfjorden.

Further transport into the Setesdal valley happened by steamboat on the Byglandsfjorden lake. One of the steamers, Bjoren, is preserved and still takes passengers during the summer season.

The station was built in the dragestil style and is now used as a library. It was designed by architect Paul Due and listed for protection in 2002.

The entire station area was protected by law in 2002 by the Norwegian Directorate for Cultural Heritage. The protection covers all the buildings: Station building's exterior and interior, outhouse construction, locomotive shed, cargo expedition, platform and loading ramp, in addition to an area around the station.
