= Voss (brand) =

Bottled water brand based in Norway

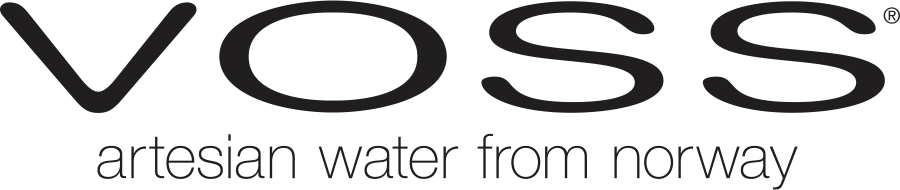

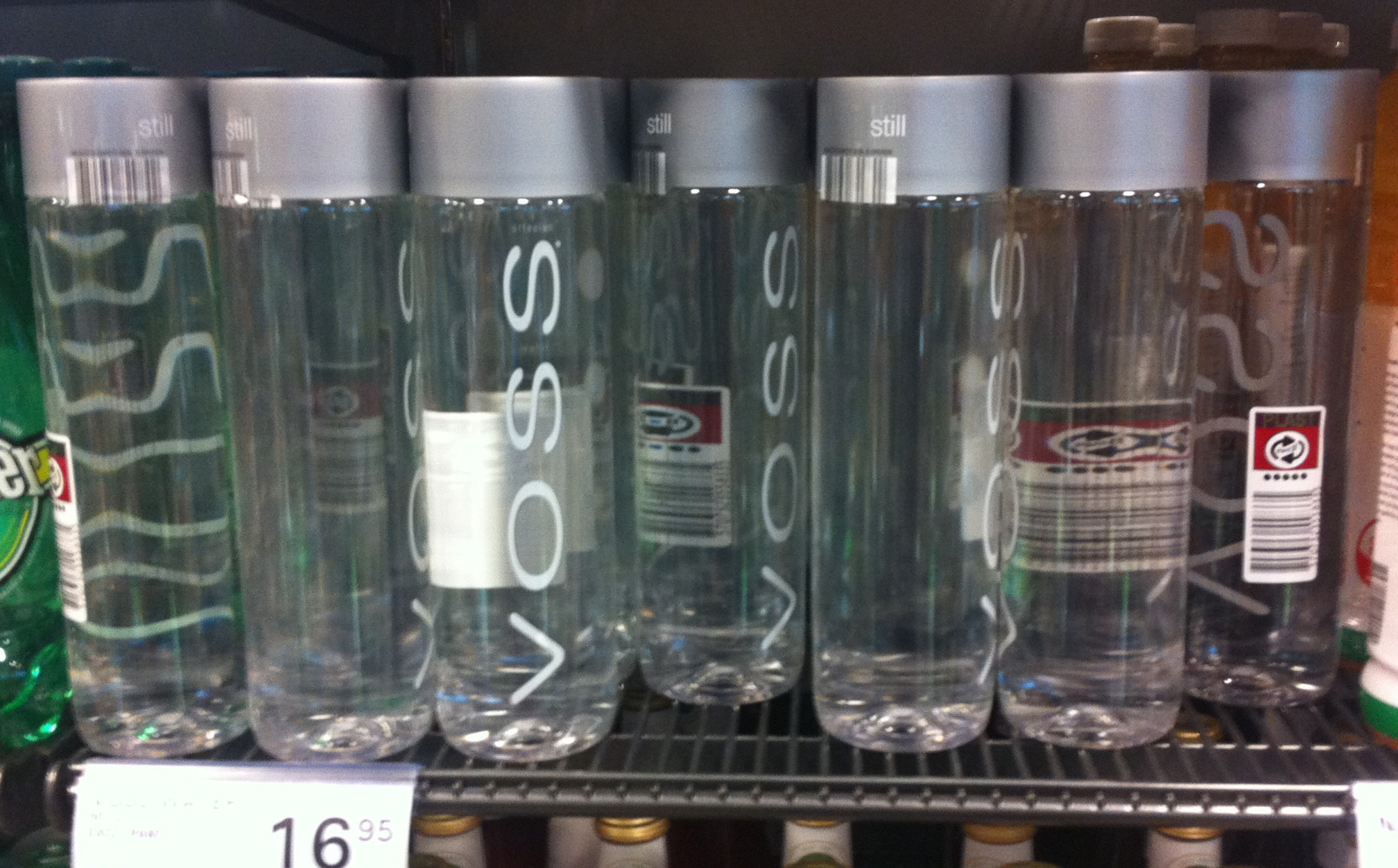
- Voss water
- Country: Norway
- Source: Iveland Municipality (inland southern Norway)
- Type: still water, sparkling water
- pH: 6
- Calcium (Ca): 5
- Chloride (Cl): 5.5
- Magnesium (Mg): 1
- Sodium (Na): 3.8
- TDS: 44
- Website: www.vosswaterglobal.com
- All concentrations in milligrams per liter (mg/L); pH without units

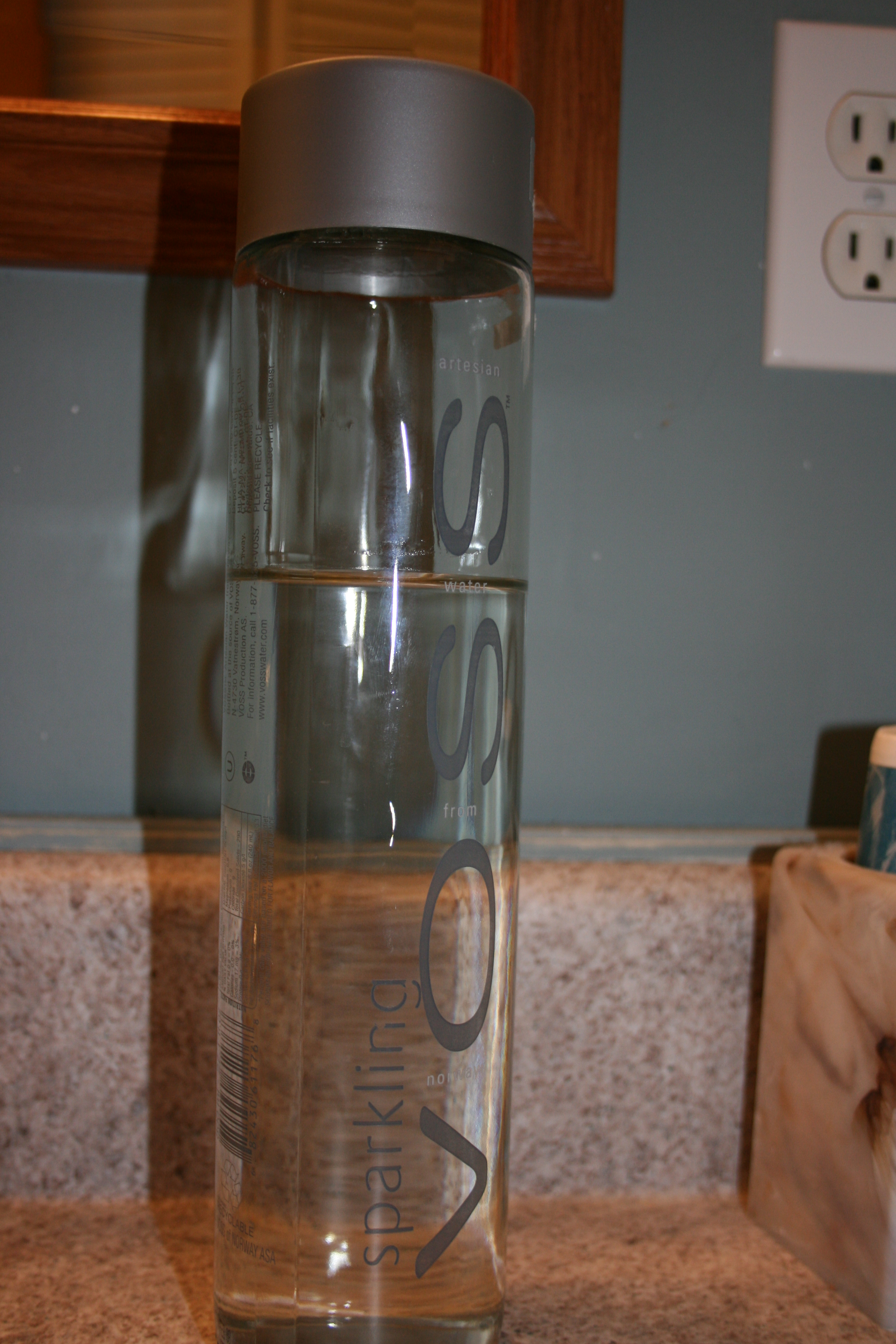
A bottle of sparkling Voss water

Voss is a Norwegian-based bottled water from the village of Vatnestrøm in Iveland Municipality in Agder county. Contrary to popular belief, the water is not bottled in Voss Municipality, which is more than 400 kilometres (250 mi) from the bottling site. It is available in both still and sparkling forms.

The company's cylindrical glass bottle was designed by Neil Kraft.

== Company history ==
=== Development ===
Voss is bottled by Voss of Norway AS, an American Limited Company headquartered in New York City. The water is marketed in over 50 countries, with a particular focus on the United States. Voss claims its manufacturing process is completely carbon neutral.

=== Recognition ===
In 2007, Women's Health magazine rated Voss #1 among several bottled waters. For entertainment on television, in tests sponsored by Finland's national broadcasting company, Yle, three blindfolded wine experts rated Voss water lowest of six waters tested, which included Helsinki public tap water.

=== Leadership ===
In 2016, Reignwood Group, a Thai-Chinese company, acquired majority control of Voss. The chairwoman of Voss is Lisa Wang and the vice chairman is John D. Shulman.

== Bottling source controversy ==
In October 2010, Norway's TV 2 reported that Voss has the same source as tap water from the municipal water supply in Iveland Municipality and, contrary to Voss marketing, that this is not artesian. TV 2 stood by these claims despite Voss's objections.
