= NSB Class XXII =

Class of Norwegian steam locomotives

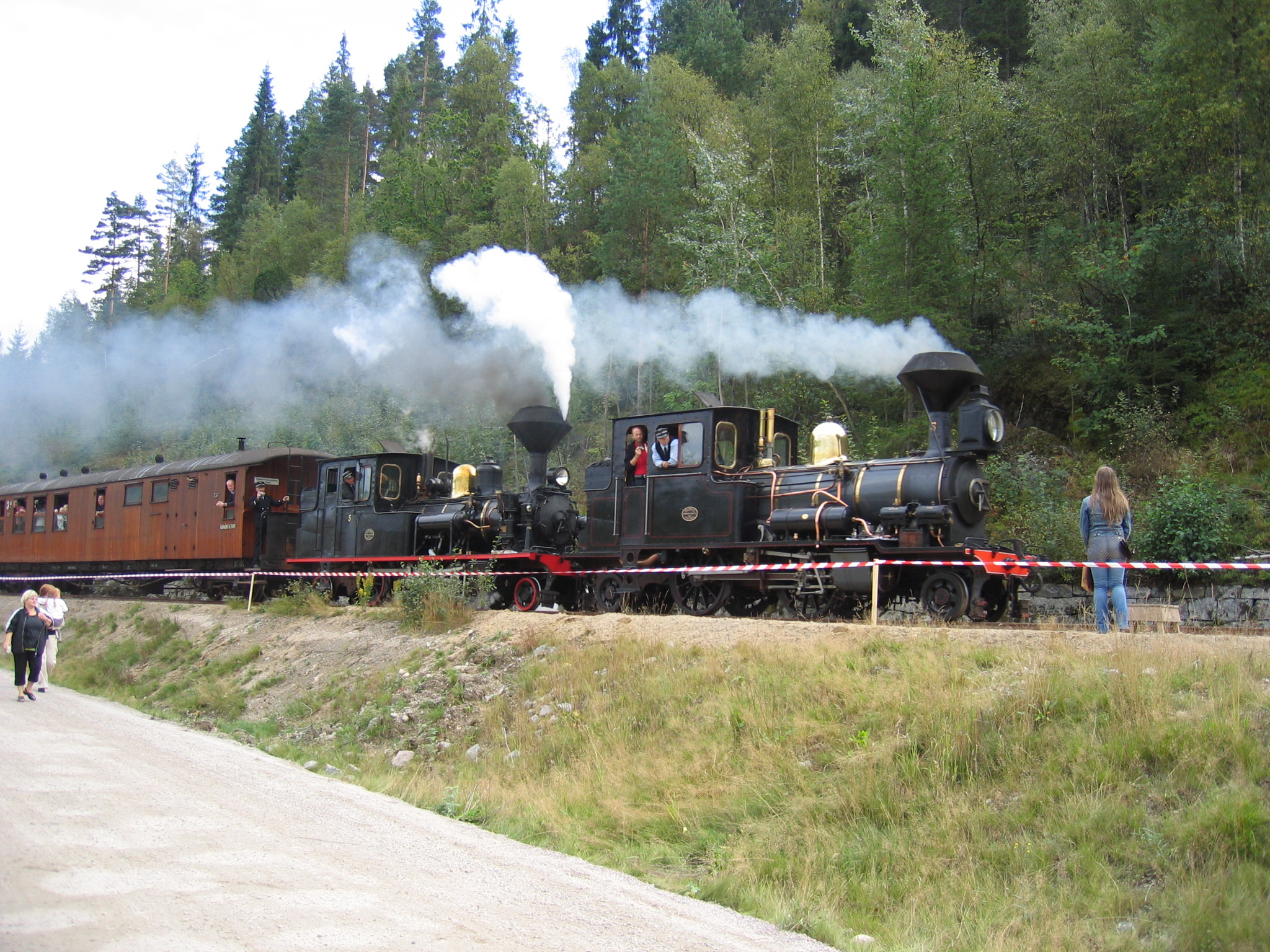
- Class XXII in front of a Class XXI
Type and origin
- Power type: Steam
- Builder: Dübs & Co. (2), Thunes Mekaniske Værksted (1)
- Serial number: Dübs 3174–3175, Thune 7
- Build date: 1895 (2), 1902 (1)
- Total produced: 3
Specifications
- Configuration
  - Whyte: 2-4-2T
  - UIC: 1′B1′ n2t
- Gauge: 1,067 mm (3 ft 6 in)
- Driver dia.: 1,143 mm (45.0 in)
- Minimum curve: 100 m (330 ft)
- Length: 7,900 mm (25.9 ft)
- Adhesive weight: 12 t
- Loco weight: 17.4 tonnes (19.2 short tons; 17.1 long tons)
- Fuel type: Coal
- Fuel capacity: 800 kg (1,760 lb)
- Water cap.: 1,800 L (400 imp gal; 480 US gal)
- Firebox
  - Grate area: 0.70 m^{2} (7.5 sq ft)
- Boiler pressure: 1,000 kPa (145 psi)
- Heating surface: 5.83 m^{2} (62.7 sq ft)
- Cylinders: Two, outside
- Cylinder size: 279 mm × 457 mm (11.0 in × 18.0 in)
- Loco brake: Hand brake; Carpenter brake from 1900
Performance figures
- Maximum speed: 55 km/h (34 mph)
Career
- Operators: Norwegian State Railways
- Numbers: 3, 4, 6
- Locale: Setesdal Line
- References: (unless where noted)

NSB Class XXII is a steam locomotive class designed by the Norwegian State Railways exclusively for use on the Setesdal Line.

== Bibliography ==
- Cranfield, John (March 2000). The Railways of Norway. J. Cranfield. ISBN 0904071049 – via Internet Archive.
