= Bakken, Agder =

Village in Iveland Municipality, Norway

Bakken
- Village
- Interactive map of Bakken
- Coordinates: 58.4023°N 07.9170°E
- Country: Norway
- Region: Southern Norway
- County: Agder
- District: Setesdal
- Municipality: Iveland Municipality
- Elevation: 167 m (548 ft)
- Time zone: UTC+01:00 (CET)
  - Summer (DST): UTC+02:00 (CEST)
- Post Code: 4724 Iveland

Bakken is a village in Iveland Municipality in Agder county, Norway. The village is located about 1.5 kilometres (0.93 mi) north of the village of Skaiå and about 6 kilometres (3.7 mi) south of the municipal centre of Birketveit.
