= Flakksvann =

Village in Birkenes Municipality, Norway

Flakksvann Flaksvand (historic)
- Village
- Interactive map of Flakksvann
- Coordinates: 58.32558°N 8.20396°E
- Country: Norway
- Region: Southern Norway
- County: Agder
- Municipality: Grimstad Municipality
- Elevation: 27 m (89 ft)
- Time zone: UTC+01:00 (CET)
  - Summer (DST): UTC+02:00 (CEST)
- Post Code: 4760 Birkeland

Flakksvann is a village in Birkenes Municipality in Agder county, Norway. The village is located just west of the village of Birkeland on the southern shore of the lake Flakksvannet.

From 1896 until 1953, the village was the terminus of the old Lillesand–Flaksvand Line railway which connected the Flakksvann-Birkeland area to the coastal seaport of Lillesand.
