= Setesdal Line =

Railway line in Norway

Coordinates: 58.2936°N 7.9808°E

Norwegian: Setesdalsbanen
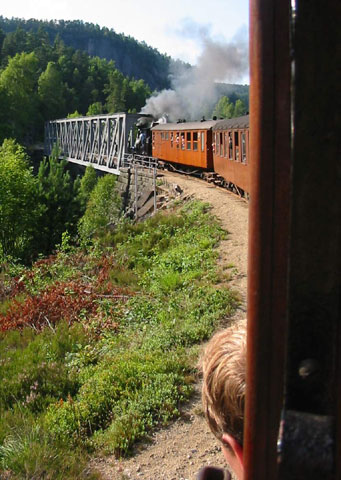
- Veteran train on the Setesdal Line, 23 July 2003. The train is driving onto the Paulen bridge.
- Terminus: Grovane Røyknes

Commercial operations
- Built by: Norwegian State Railways
- Original gauge: 1,067 mm (3 ft 6 in)
- Original electrification: None

Preserved operations
- Owned by: Setesdal Line
- Operated by: Setesdal Line
- Stations: Kristiansand Station - Byglandsfjord Station (original); Grovane Station - Røyknes Station (heritage)
- Length: 78 km (48 mi) (original); 8 km (5 mi) (heritage)
- Preserved gauge: 1,067 mm (3 ft 6 in)

Commercial history
- Opened: 26 November 1895
- Closed: 1 September 1962

Website
- setesdalsbanen.no

The Setesdal Line (Norwegian: Setesdalsbanen) was a railway between Kristiansand and Byglandsfjord in southern Norway, 78 km (48 mi) long. It was built with a narrow gauge of 1,067 mm (3 ft 6 in), and opened to Hægeland 26 November 1895, and to Byglandsfjord 27 November 1896. Stations along the line included Mosby, Vennesla, Grovene (Grovane), Iveland and Hægeland.

Today, only the 8 km (5.0 mi) stretch between Grovane and Røyknes of the original line is preserved as a heritage railway.

== History ==
When the standard gauged Sørlandet Line was opened to Kristiansand in 1938, Grovane became the new terminal station for the Setesdal Line, with connection to the Sørlandet Line.

The Setesdal Line was suspended from 1 September 1962, and the track was lifted between Byglandsfjord and Beihølen. The 6 km (3.7 mi) line between Beihølen and Grovane was, however, preserved by local enthusiasts. The Setesdal Line Hobby Club was already established in 1964.

Today, the Setesdal Line is a railway museum with steam trains serving the 8 km (5.0 mi) line between Grovane and Røyknes. Four steam locomotives from 1894-1902 are preserved, along with a number of passenger and freight cars.

== The preserved locomotives ==
=== Narrow gauge steam locomotives ===
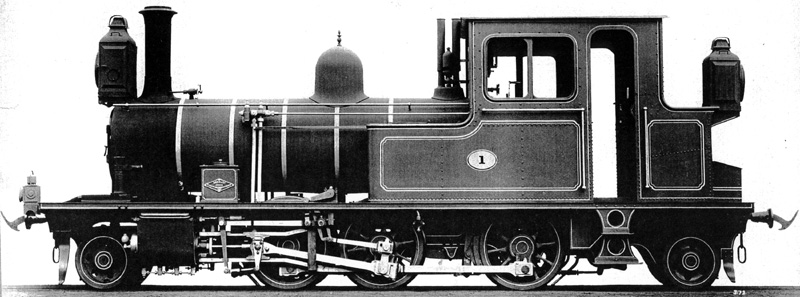
NSB Class XXI number 1

- Class XXI number 1, built at Dübs and Company in 1894.
- Class XXI number 2, built at Dübs and Company in 1894.
- Class XXI number 5, built at Thunes Mekaniske Værksted in 1901.
- Class XXII number 6, built at Thunes Mekaniske Værksted in 1902.

=== Narrow gauge diesel locomotives ===
- SJ Class Z4t number 227, built in 1950. Bought from the SJ in 1976.
- SJ Class Z4t number 307, built in 1952. Bought from the SJ in 1981.

=== Narrow gauge railcars ===
- Cmbo-1 number 2672, built in 1932 at Strømmens Værksted. 56 passengers.
- Cmdo Sulitelma, built in 1957 at Strømmens Værksted. 56 passengers. Transferred to the Setesdal Line after the closure of Sulitjelma Line.

=== Standard gauge diesel locomotives ===
These locomotives are only used for shunting at areas with dual gauge track.

- Skd 206 number 39, built in 1936.
- Skd 206 number 44, built in 1936.

== Heritage railway stations and stops ==
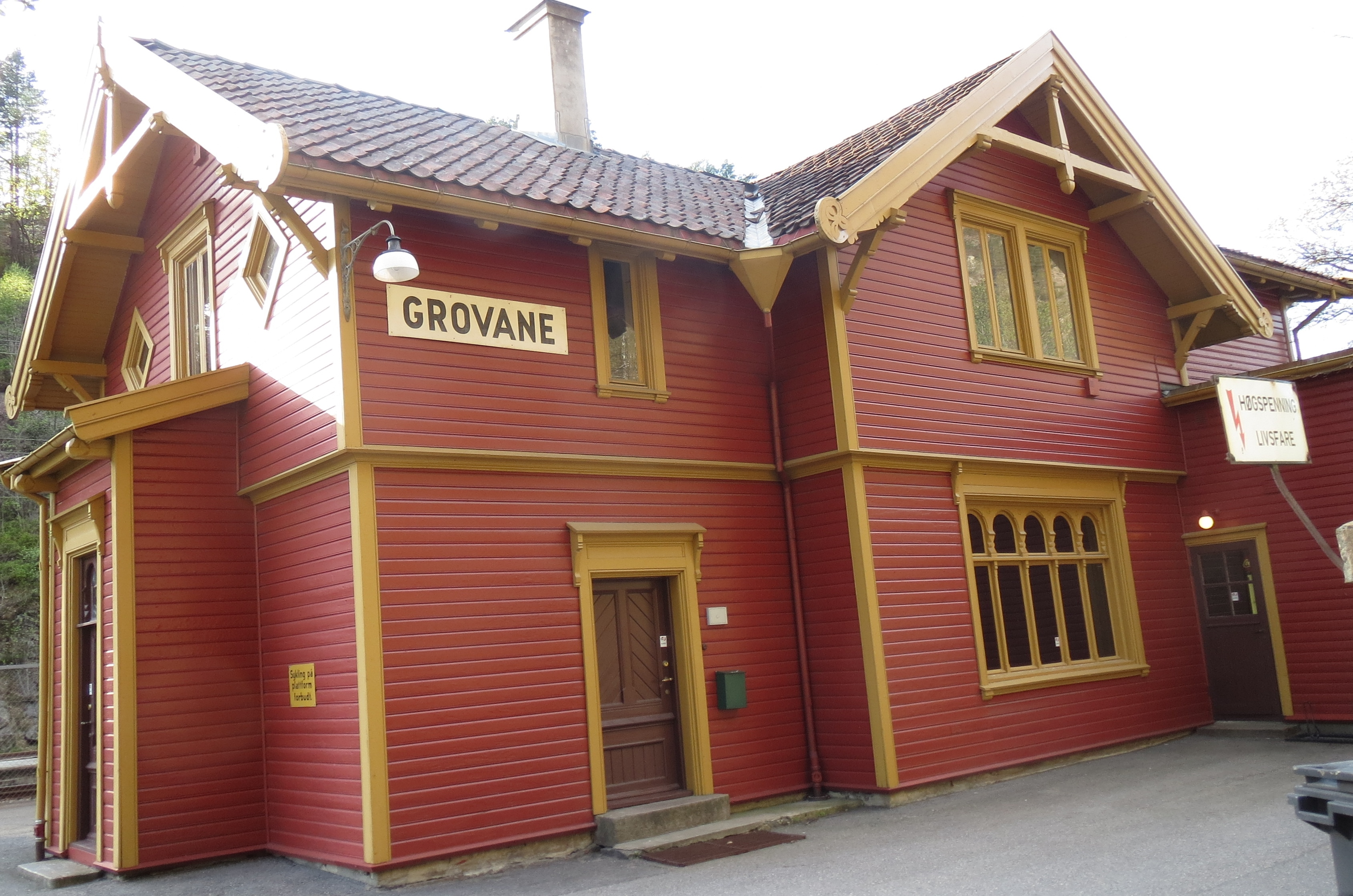
Grovane Station

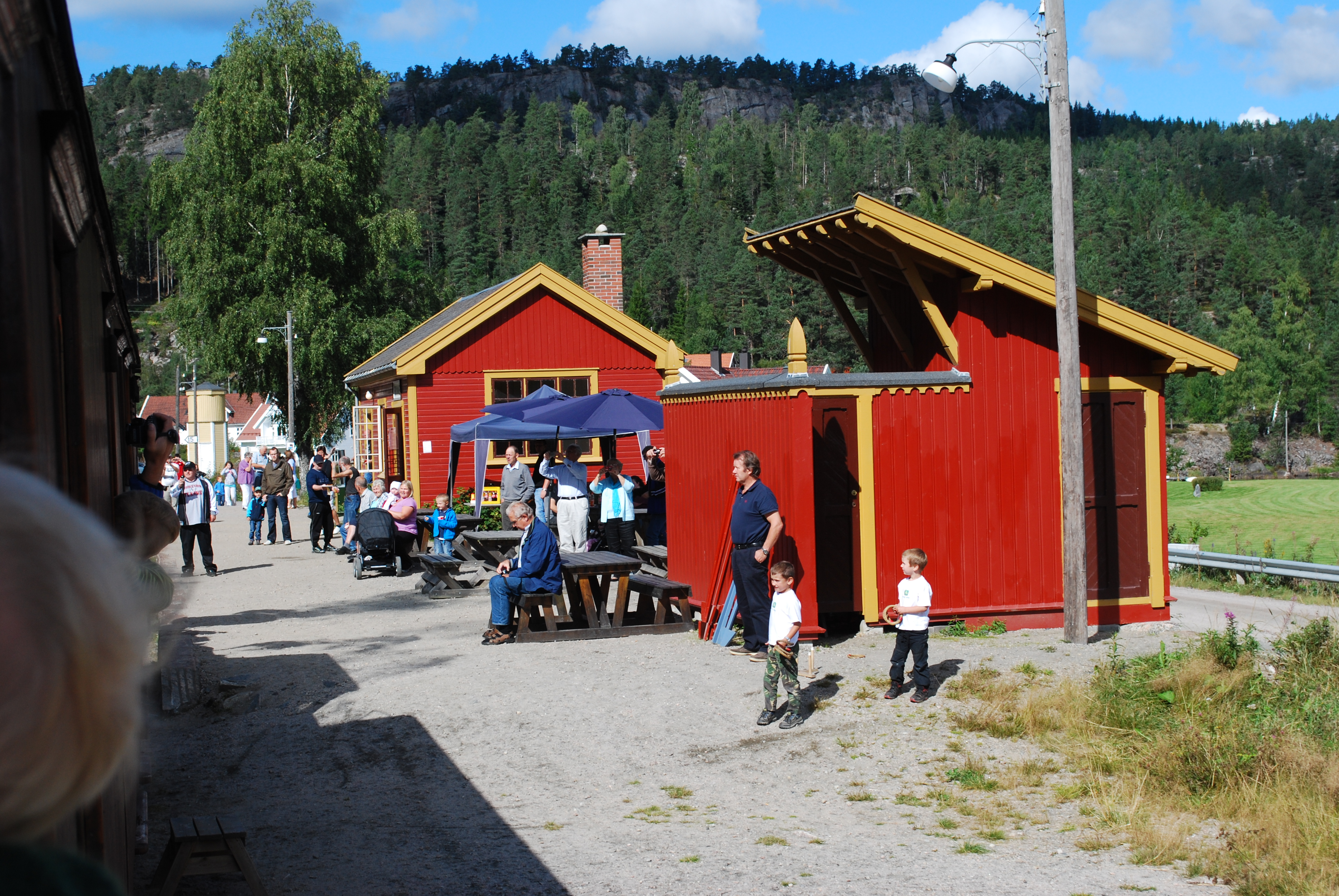
Røyknes Station

The following stations and stops exist at the current railway museum:

Name	Type	Distance from Oslo V		Length	
Name	Type	km	miles	m	ft
Grovane	Station	345.25	214.53		
Rugåna	Steel bridge	345.40	214.62	13.6	45
Store bu	Siding	345.69	214.80		
Grovane	Stop	345.80	214.87		
Grovane	Level crossing	345.87	214.91		
Paulen	Truss bridge	347.13	215.70	50.1	164
Paulen	Stop	347.59	215.98		
Paulen gård	Stop	347.76	216.09		
Kringsjå	Stop	348.17	216.34		
Løyning	Tunnel	349.74	217.32	123	404
Beihølen dam	Stop	350.53	217.81		
Beihøldalen	Station	350.97	218.08		
Otterdals	Siding	351.79	218.59		
Røyknes	Station	353.22	219.48		
Langåen	Steel bridge	353.37	219.57	9.32	30.6

== Setesdal Line 1896 - 1938 ==
Connection with steamboat on Lake Byglandsfjorden from Byglandsfjord Station. The railway line was closed in 1962, but parts of the railroad have been preserved. It is a current narrow-gauge heritage railroad between Røyknes and Grovane and the current standard gauged track from Grovane Station to Kristiansand Station is a part of the current Sørlandet Line. Several of the station buildings along the former railroad are still preserved. Rail passengers had to change trains at Grovane Station from 1938 to 1962 due to different track widths, narrow-gauge to normal gauge.

=== Route ===
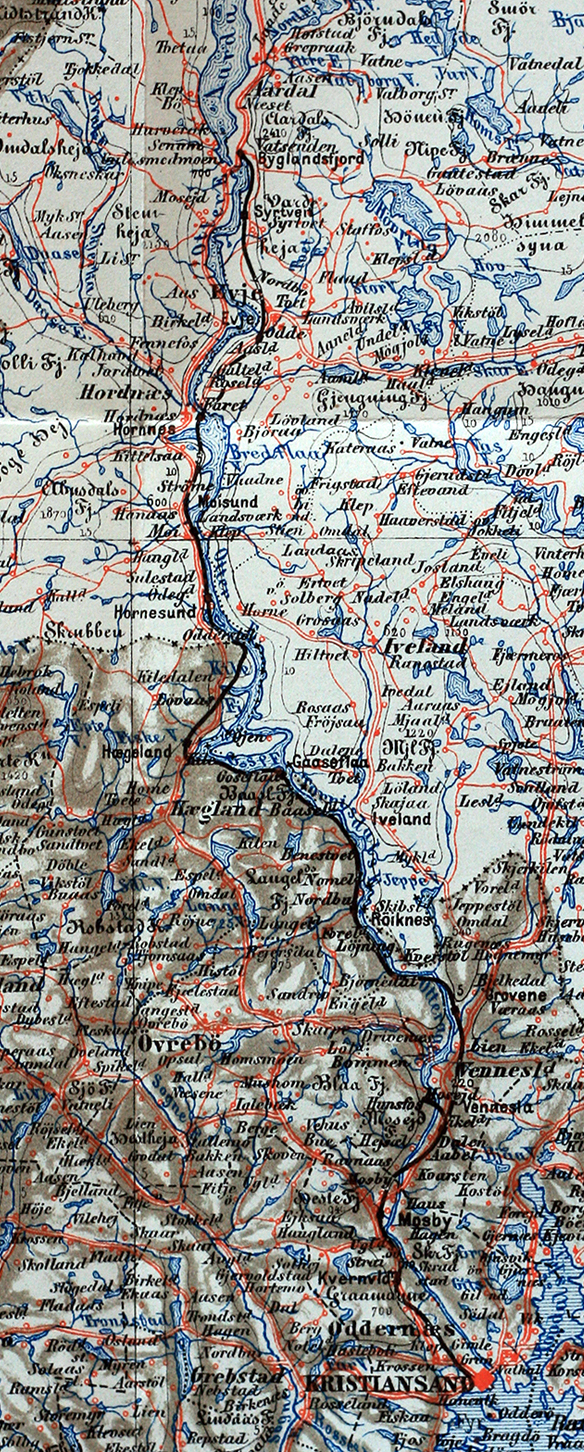
The Setesdal Line 1896 - 1938

== See also ==
- Lars Lysgaard
- Narrow gauge railways in Norway
