= Ogge =

Lake in Agder, Norway

- Interactive map of Ogge
- Location: Agder county
- Coordinates: 58.418°N 8.11482°E
- Primary outflows: Rettåna
- Basin countries: Norway
- Max. length: 16 kilometres (9.9 mi)
- Max. width: 3 kilometres (1.9 mi)
- Surface area: 6.9 km^{2} (2.7 sq mi)
- Shore length^{1}: 90 kilometres (56 mi)
- Surface elevation: 192 metres (630 ft)
- Islands: 365 islands
- References: NVE
- ^{1} Shore length is not a well-defined measure.

Ogge is a lake in Agder county, Norway. The lake lies along the border of Birkenes Municipality and Iveland Municipality. It is located about 40 kilometres (25 mi) north of the city of Kristiansand, just east of the villages of Vatnestrøm (in Iveland Municipality) and Oggevatn (in Birkenes Municipality). The 6.9-square-kilometre (2.7 sq mi) lake includes about 365 islands and reefs. The overall length of the lake is approximately 16 kilometres (9.9 mi). The Sørlandsbanen railway line and the Norwegian County Road 405 both run along the west side of the lake.

== Recreation ==
Ogge is a place for canoeing and kayaking. It has a number of camping sites with restrooms and picnic facilities on many of the small islands. Very little of the shoreline is private property. On canoe trips, there are moose (Alces alces), beaver, and varied birdlife. Canoes can be rented locally.

== See also ==
- List of lakes in Aust-Agder
- List of lakes in Norway
