= Nicolay Nicolaysen Sontum =

Norwegian engineer (1852–1915)

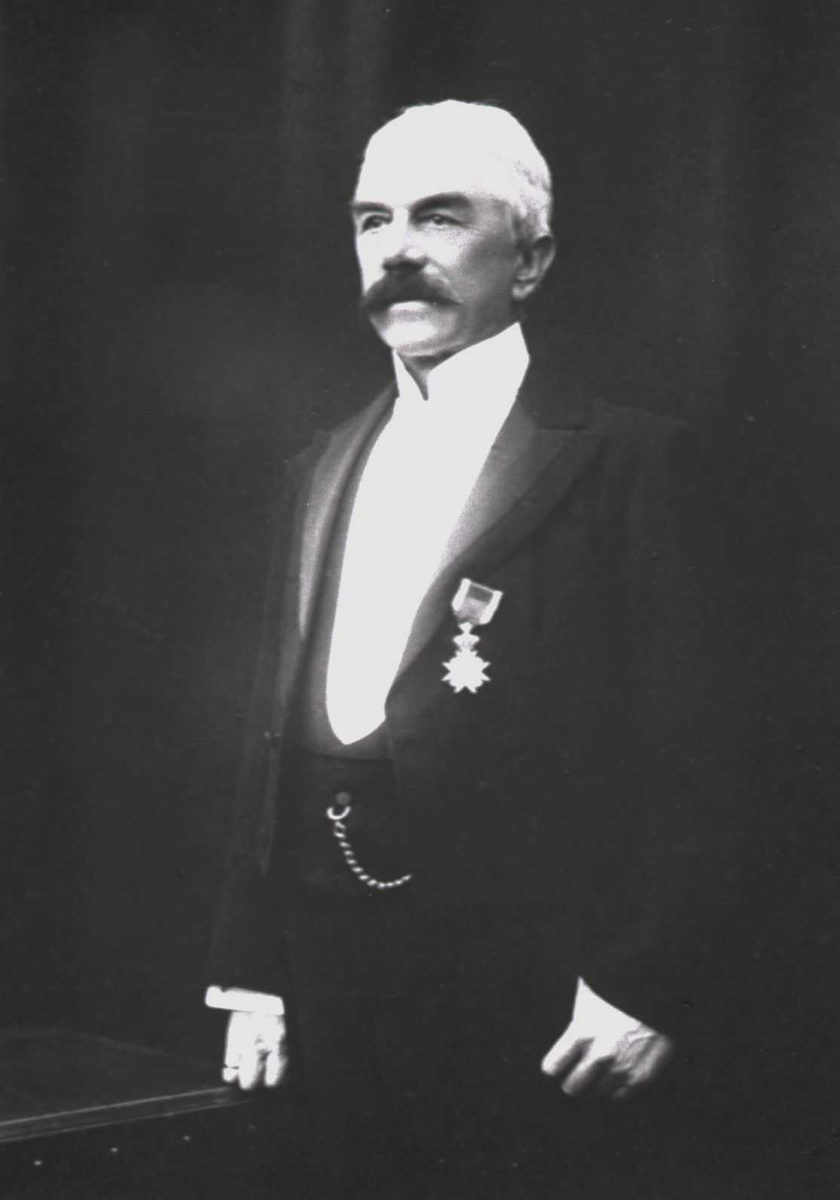
- circa 1900

Nicolay Nicolaysen Sontum (1852–1915) was a Norwegian engineer, businessperson and contractor.

Sontum was born in Bergen in 1852 and took an engineering degree from Chalmers University of Technology in Gothenburg, Sweden, in 1874. From 1875 to 1876, he worked as an assistant engineer for the Norwegian State Railways during the construction of the Røros Line, from 1876 to 1878 he worked as an assistant engineer during the construction of the Meråker Line. In 1880, he established himself as an independent engineering consultant, and established Det private Ingeniør- og Opmaalingskontor in Bergen. He worked on several of the docks in Bergen and other road and dock projects throughout Western Norway. By the 1890s, his company had developed into a contractor and he was the main contractor for two private narrow gauge railways, the Nesttun–Os Railway and the Lillesand–Flaksvand Line.

In 1899, he started as a waterfall speculator and bought the waterfalls from Storefjorden to Krokstadvatnet, the Osen River and the waterfalls in Gjengedalen. These were later sold to Sogn og Fjordane County Municipality, who subsequently created Sogn og Fjordane Energi. In 1905, was appointed port engineer for Bergen, a position he held for the rest of his life. He was a founding member of Bergen Tekniske Forening, where he was periodically deputy leader. He has also deputy leader of Det Norske Ingeniør- og Akritektforening which was founded in 1912. He died in 1915. His company, Ingeniørfirma N. Sotrum AS, remains as a fire equipment manufacturer in Nesttun, Bergen.
