= SS Bjoren =

1866 Norwegian steamboat

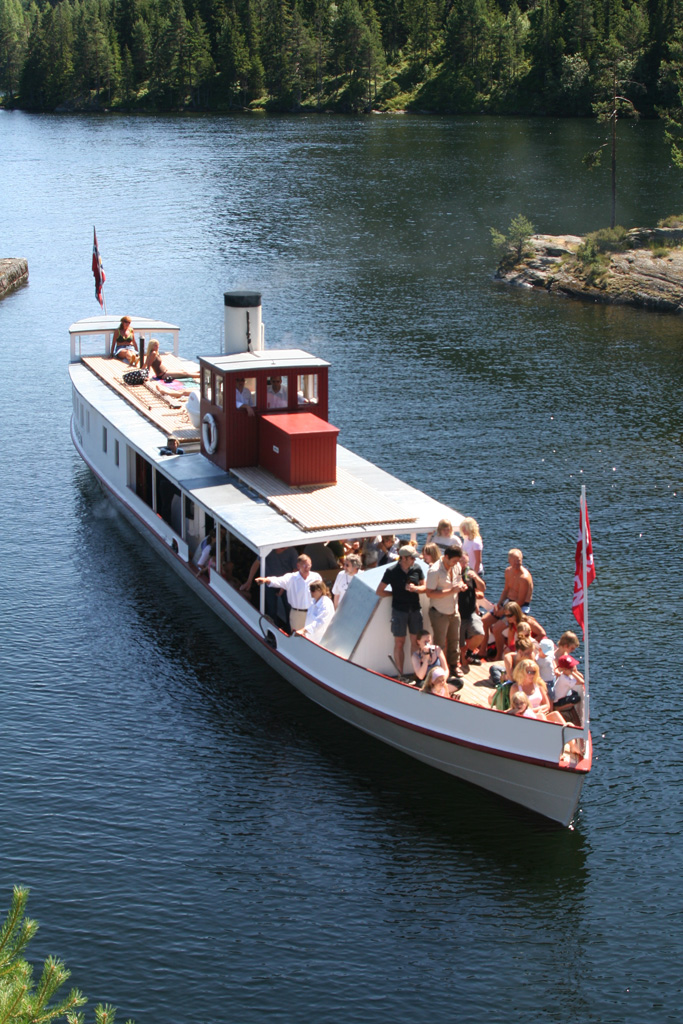

History

Norway
- Name: SS Bjoren
- Owner: Bygland Municipality
- Operator: Bjoren AS
- Route: Bygland-Byglandsfjord – Bygland – Bygland-Ose; Kilefjorden (Evje to Hægeland) (1866-1896)
- Builder: Akers Mekaniske Verksted
- Yard number: 35
- Laid down: 1866
- Maiden voyage: 8 June 1867
- In service: 1867-1957, since 1994
- Out of service: 1957-1994
- Refit: 1897; 1914; 1970s until 1994 (Drammen Skibsreparasjoner A/S)
- Home port: Byglandsfjord
- Honours and awards: Olavsrose June 25, 2013
- Status: active

General characteristics
- Tonnage: 26 long tons, 29 short tons
- Length: 20,8 m (since 1914); 17,8 m (1897-1914); 16 m
- Decks: 1
- Installed power: 42 bhp (since 1914); 14 bhp
- Propulsion: 1 steam engine, 1 wood-fired boiler, 1 propeller
- Capacity: 55 people (since 1994), 92 people

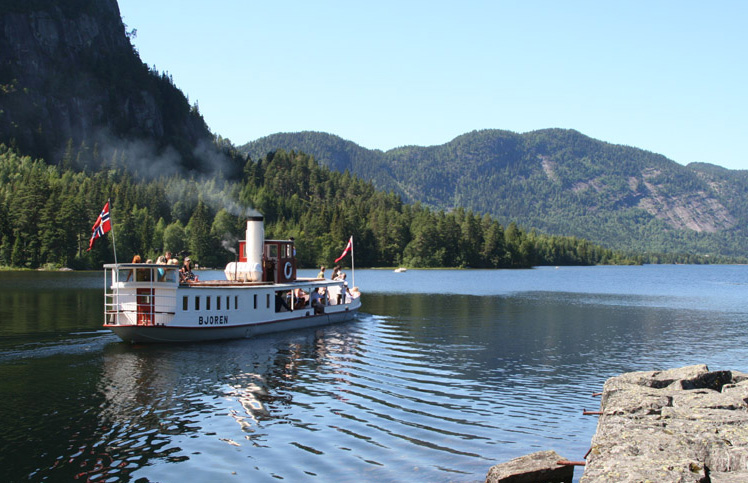
SS Bjoren as she steams away from the old water locks at Storestraum in the northern part of the lake Byglandsfjorden.

SS Bjoren is a wood-fuelled steamboat that travels the route between Bygland-Byglandsfjord, Bygland and Bygland-Ose on the lake Byglandsfjorden in Bygland Municipality in the Setesdal valley. She runs on Sundays in July.

Using wood as fuel is a natural choice as there was, and still is, good local access to it. Using wood to fuel the steam engine contributes to make Bjoren a unique part of Norway's cultural heritage and a floating technical museum.

== History ==
The steamer Bjoren was built at Akers Mekaniske Verksted in 1866. She was 52 feet (16 m) long, had a 14 bhp (10 kW) engine and was certified for up to 92 passengers. In 1897, the boat was extended by 6 feet (1.8 m) and in 1914 she was further extended by 10 feet (3.0 m). She had a new boiler installed and new engine that produced 42 bhp (31 kW). Today the boat is 21 metres (69 ft) long and weighs 26 tonnes (26 long tons; 29 short tons). She is certified for up to 55 passengers.

In the early years Bjoren was in regular use at a place called Kilefjorden, a part of the river Otra. When the Setesdal Line, a narrow gauge railroad, was opened to Byglandsfjord Station in 1896 and as a direct cause of this she was moved to her present location in Byglandsfjord, about 30 kilometres (19 mi) north in the valley Setesdal where she was in service until 1957. In the 1920s, buses took most of the traffic in the valley and eventually, when a new road was built in the 1950s, the steamer's need for commuting was gone. The boat was put in storage, deterioration started and eventually she sank.

== Bjoren's next life ==
In the 1970s, a group of local enthusiasts decided to make an attempt to preserve the boat. As the boat was counted as part of Norwegian history, the government saw its interests and they helped with the funding. The boat was restored at Drammen Shiprepairs A/S and in 1994 was once again ready to be used.

Today, Bjoren is owned by the Bygland municipality and run by the company Bjoren AS. In addition, the local group called Bjorens venner (Friends of Bjoren) put a lot of effort into preserving the technical values of the boat. Bjoren is still receiving government funding and, as the world's only existing wood-fuelled steamboat still in service, she is a unique attraction to both tourists and others.
