= Røyknes =

Village in Vennesla Municipality, Norway

- Village
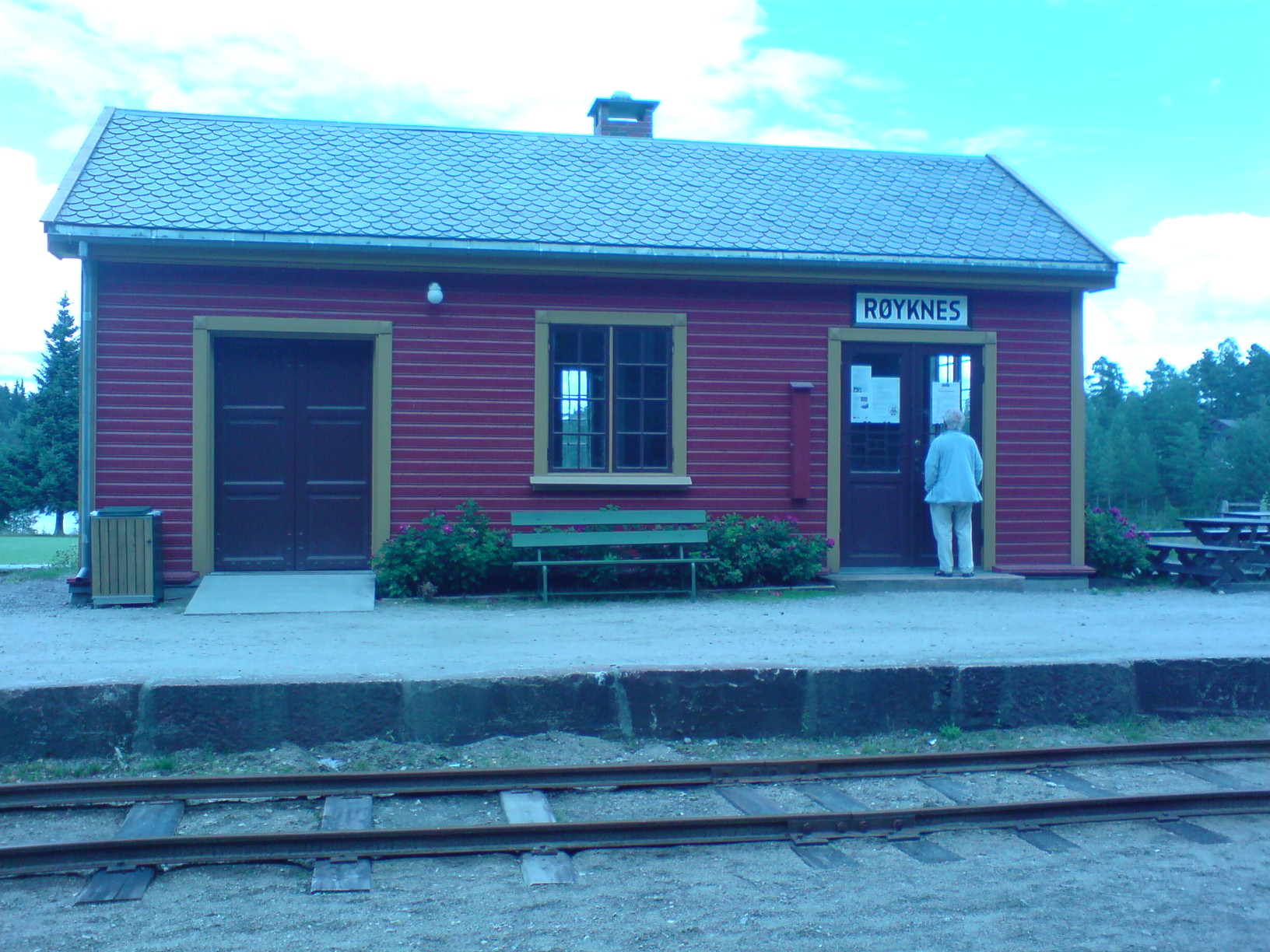
- View of the village railway station
- Interactive map of Røyknes
- Coordinates: 58.3445°N 07.8977°E
- Country: Norway
- Region: Southern Norway
- County: Agder
- District: Kristiansand
- Municipality: Vennesla Municipality
- Elevation: 100 m (330 ft)
- Time zone: UTC+01:00 (CET)
  - Summer (DST): UTC+02:00 (CEST)
- Post Code: 4715 Øvrebø

Røyknes is a village in Vennesla Municipality in Agder county, Norway. The village is located along the west side of the river Otra, about 7.5 kilometres (4.7 mi) northeast of the village of Skarpengland. The border between Vennesla Municipality and Iveland Municipality is the river which is adjacent to the village. Røyknes has about 100 inhabitants.

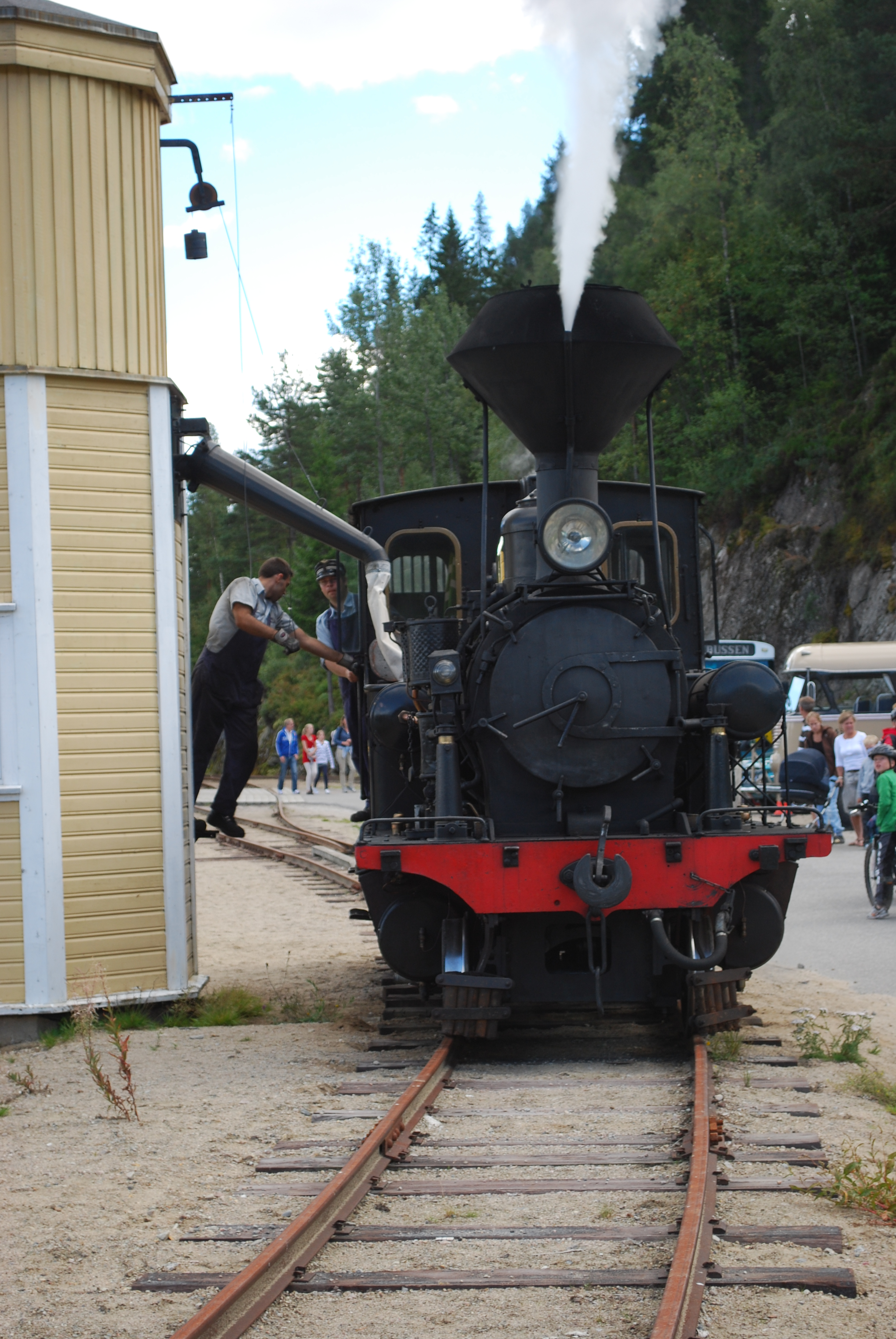
The steam tank is filled up at the terminal

Røyknes Station is the terminal station of the Setesdal Line heritage railway which runs northwest from the village of Grovane.
