= Lars Lysgaard =

Norwegian railway engineer

Lars Lysgaard (9 February 1841 – 25 February 1905) was a Norwegian railway engineer. He was among other things director of the Setesdal Line.
