= Oggevatn =

Village in Birkenes Municipality, Norway

- Village
- Interactive map of Oggevatn
- Coordinates: 58.4448°N 08.1109°E
- Country: Norway
- Region: Southern Norway
- County: Agder
- Municipality: Birkenes Municipality
- Elevation: 209 m (686 ft)
- Time zone: UTC+01:00 (CET)
  - Summer (DST): UTC+02:00 (CEST)
- Post Code: 4730 Vatnestrøm

Oggevatn is a village in Birkenes Municipality in Agder county, Norway. The village is located on the western shore of the large lake Ogge, just north of the border with Iveland Municipality. The Sørlandsbanen railway line runs through the village. The village of Vatnestrøm lies about 5 kilometres (3.1 mi) southwest of Oggevatn.
