= Hagestad =

Hagestad is a surname. Notable people with the surname include:

- Gunhild Hagestad (born 1942), Norwegian sociologist
- Stewart Hagestad (born 1991), American amateur golfer
