= NSB Class XXI =

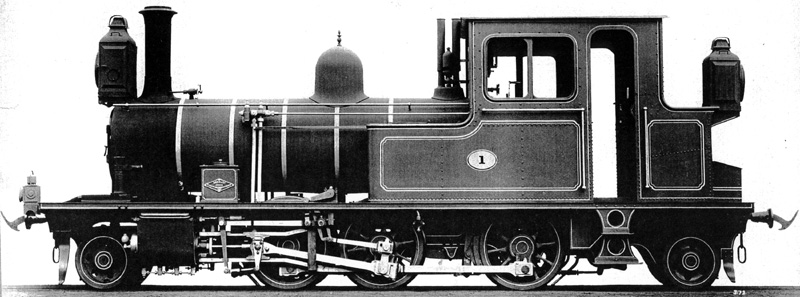
- NSB locomotive class XXI number 1 photographed at Dübs & Co. Locomotive Works before delivery to the Setesdal Line. Photograph by Dübs & Co., 1894.
Type and origin
- Power type: Steam
- Builder: Dübs & Co. (2); Thunes Mekaniske Værksted (1), Hamar Jernstøberi (1)
- Serial number: Dübs 3172–3173, Thune 4, Hamar 77
- Build date: 1894 (2), 1901 (1) 1912 (1)
- Total produced: 4
Specifications
- Configuration
  - Whyte: 2-6-2T
  - UIC: 1′C1′t n2
- Gauge: 1,067 mm (3 ft 6 in)
- Driver dia.: 914 mm (36.0 in)
- Minimum curve: 100 m (330 ft)
- Length: 8,300 mm (27.2 ft)
- Adhesive weight: 14.7 t
- Loco weight: 18.7 t
- Fuel type: Coal
- Fuel capacity: 800 kg (1,800 lb)
- Water cap.: 2.1 t
- Firebox
  - Grate area: 0.7 m^{2} (7.5 sq ft)
- Boiler pressure: 1.00 MPa (145 psi)
- Heating surface: 37.87 m^{2} (407.6 sq ft)
- Cylinders: Two, outside
- Cylinder size: 279.4 mm × 457.2 mm (11 in × 18 in) or 292.1 mm × 457.2 mm (11.5 in × 18 in)
- Loco brake: Hand brake, Carpenter brake from 1900
Performance figures
- Maximum speed: 40 km/h (25 mph)
Career
- Operators: Norwegian State Railways
- Numbers: 1, 2, 5, 7
- Locale: Setesdal Line

NSB Class XXI is a steam locomotive class designed by the Norwegian State Railways exclusively for use on the Setesdal Line.
