= Iveland Church =

Church in Agder, Norway

- Iveland kirke
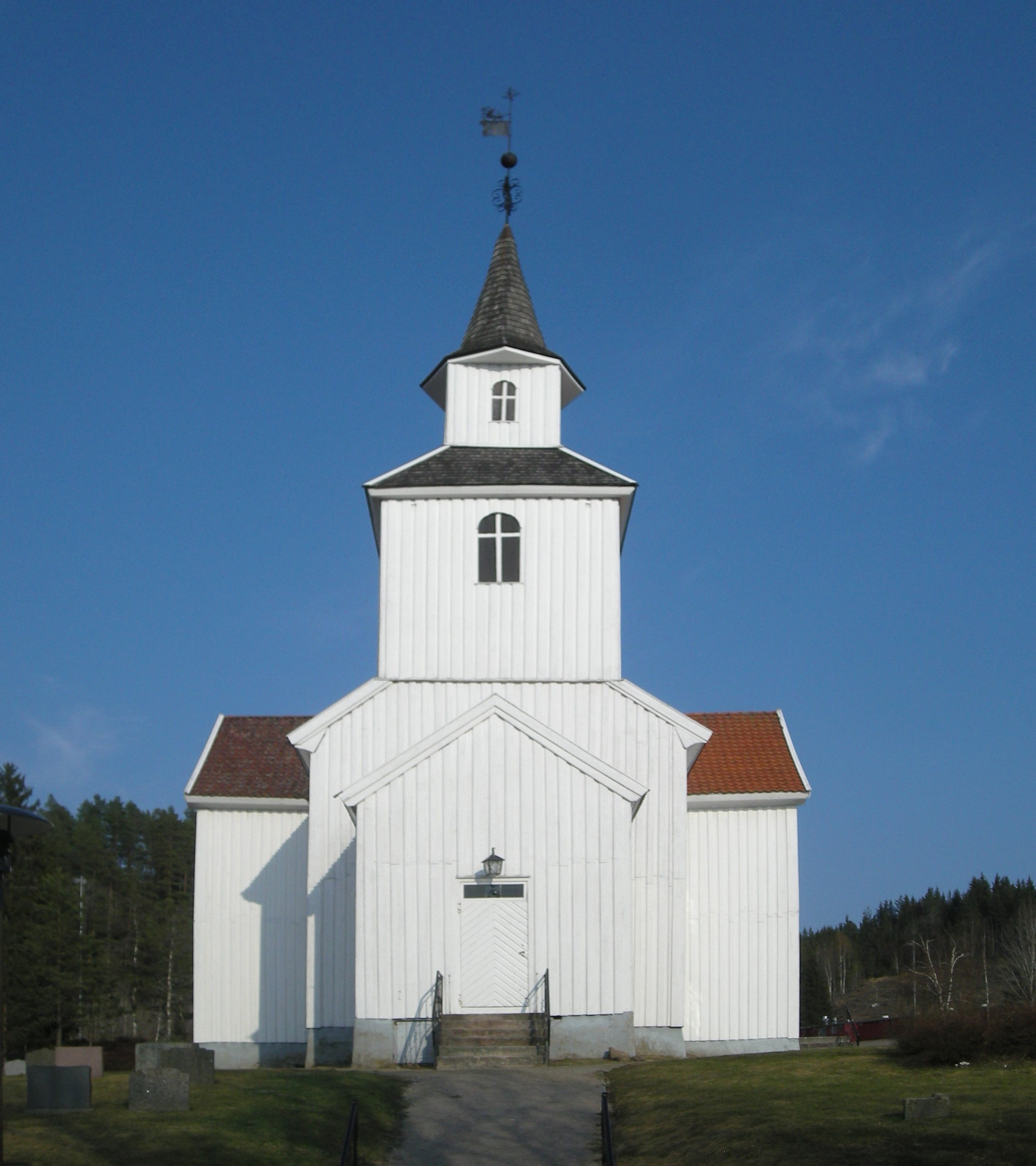
- View of the church
- Iveland Church
- 58.4562°N 07.9189°E
- Location: Iveland Municipality, Agder
- Country: Norway
- Denomination: Church of Norway
- Previous denomination: Catholic Church
- Churchmanship: Evangelical Lutheran

History
- Status: Parish church
- Founded: 14th century
- Consecrated: 27 Aug 1837

Architecture
- Functional status: Active
- Architect: Hans Linstow
- Architectural type: Cruciform
- Completed: 1837 (189 years ago)

Specifications
- Capacity: 350
- Materials: Wood

Administration
- Diocese: Agder og Telemark
- Deanery: Otredal prosti
- Parish: Iveland
- Norwegian Cultural Heritage Site
- Type: Church
- Status: Automatically protected
- ID: 84729

Iveland Church (Norwegian: Iveland kirke) is a parish church of the Church of Norway in Iveland Municipality in Agder county, Norway. It is located in the village of Birketveit. It is the church for the Iveland parish which is part of the Otredal prosti (deanery) in the Diocese of Agder og Telemark. The white, wooden church was built in a cruciform design in 1837 by Anders Thorsen Syrtveit who used plans drawn up by the architect Hans Linstow. The church seats about 350 people.

== History ==
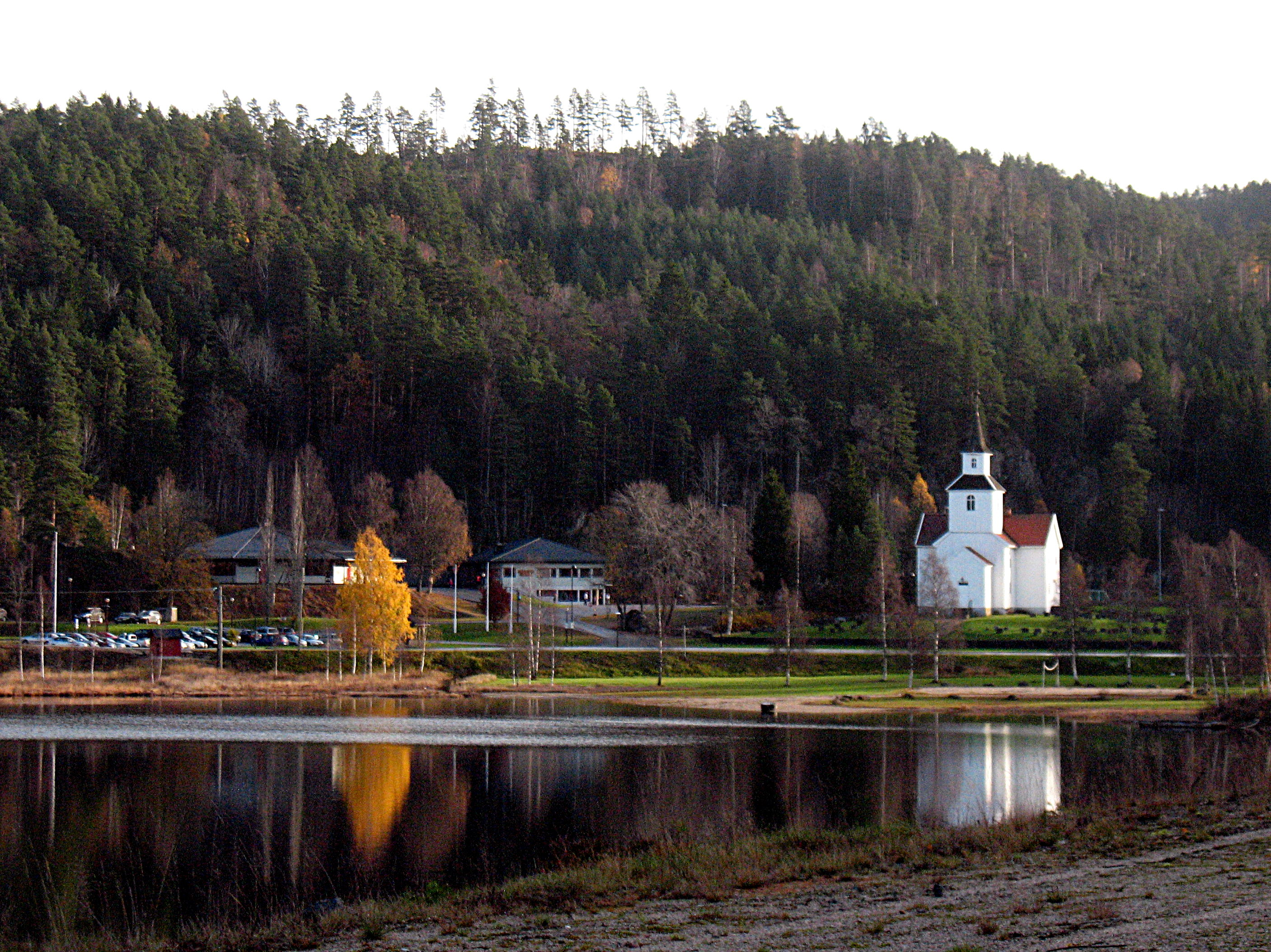
View of the church

The earliest existing historical records of the church date back to the year 1426, but the church was not new that year. The first church was likely a stave church that was probably built during the 14th century. Around the year 1500, the old church was torn down and a new timber-framed church was built on the same site. In 1680, the church was enlarged. In 1723, the King sold the church into private ownership. After a few years, the parish purchased the building so it was then owned by the congregation. In the early 1830s, the church was too small and the government agreed to replace the building. In 1836, the old church was torn down. Anders Thorsen Syrtveit was hired to build a new cruciform church on roughly the same site. The work began in 1836 and was finished in 1837. The new building was consecrated on 27 August 1837. The wooden church had a natural exterior until 1842 when plank siding was installed and it was painted red. In 1854, the church was painted white (it has remained that color ever since).

== See also ==
- List of churches in Agder og Telemark
