= Skaiå =

Village in Iveland Municipality, Norway

- Village
- Interactive map of Skaiå
- Coordinates: 58.3929°N 07.9139°E
- Country: Norway
- Region: Southern Norway
- County: Agder
- District: Setesdal
- Municipality: Iveland Municipality
- Elevation: 135 m (443 ft)
- Time zone: UTC+01:00 (CET)
  - Summer (DST): UTC+02:00 (CEST)
- Post Code: 4724 Iveland

Skaiå is a village in Iveland Municipality in Agder county, Norway. The village is located about 900 metres (3,000 ft) northeast of the river Otra, and it is about 1.5 kilometres (0.93 mi) south of the village of Bakken.
