= Einar Iveland =

Norwegian politician

Einar Iveland (9 May 1892 – 15 May 1975) was a Norwegian politician for the Liberal Party.

He was born in Iveland Municipality. He was elected to the Norwegian Parliament from Aust-Agder in 1950, but was not re-elected in 1954. He had previously served in the position of deputy representative during the term 1934–1936.

Iveland held various positions on the municipal council of Iveland Municipality from 1933 to 1950, and was chairman of Aust-Agder county council in 1940 and 1945–1949.
