= Vatnestrøm =

Village in Iveland Municipality, Norway

- Village
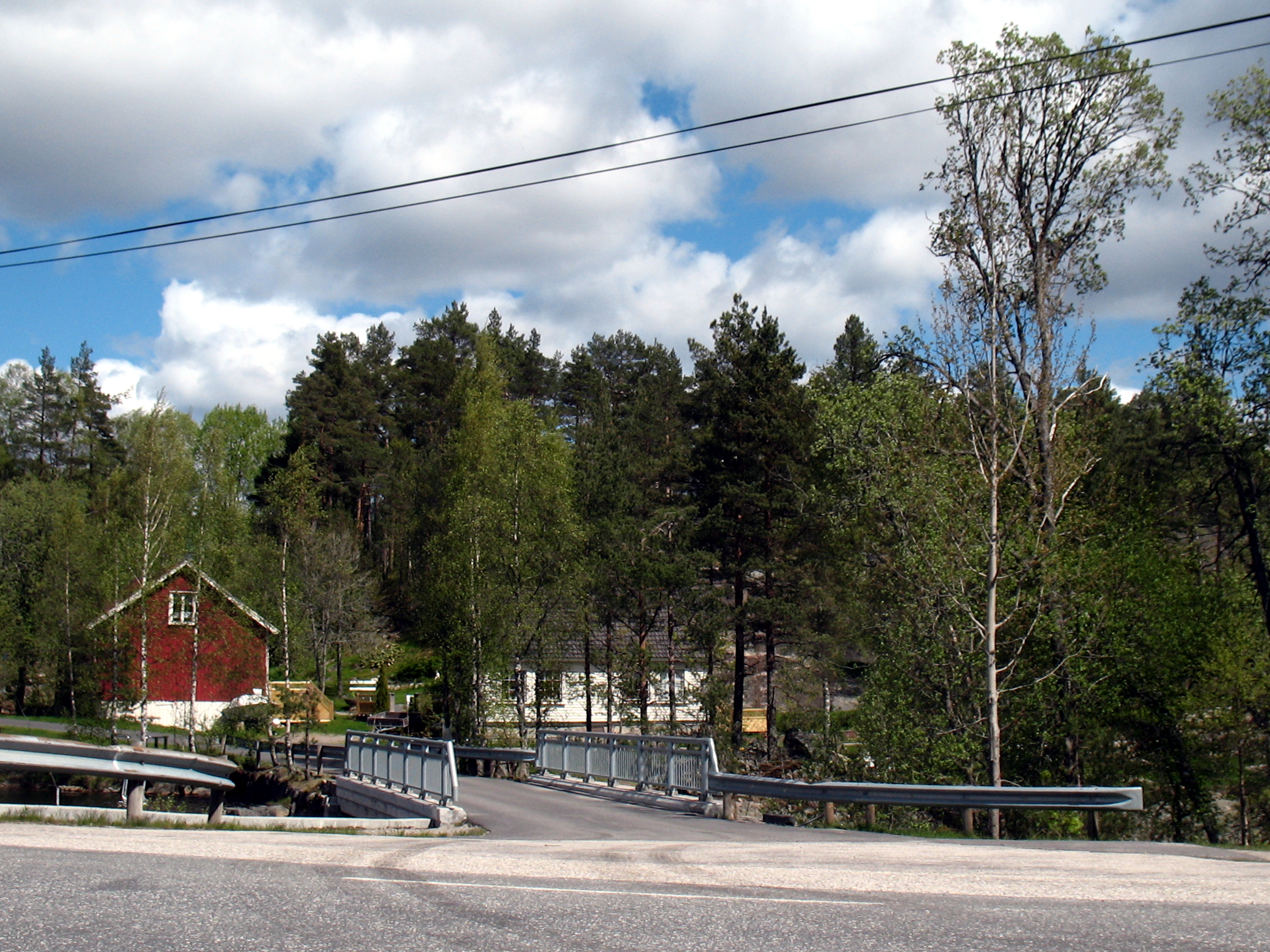
- View of the village
- Interactive map of Vatnestrøm
- Coordinates: 58.4131°N 08.0627°E
- Country: Norway
- Region: Southern Norway
- County: Agder
- District: Setesdal
- Municipality: Iveland Municipality
- Elevation: 198 m (650 ft)
- Time zone: UTC+01:00 (CET)
  - Summer (DST): UTC+02:00 (CEST)
- Post Code: 4730 Vatnestrøm

Vatnestrøm is a village in Iveland Municipality in Agder county, Norway. It is along Norwegian County Road 405, on the western shore of the lake Ogge. The municipal centre of Birketveit lies about 12 kilometres (7.5 mi) northwest and the village of Oggevatn in the neighboring Birkenes Municipality lies about 6 kilometres (3.7 mi) northeast.
