= Birketveit =

Village in Iveland Municipality, Norway

Birketveit Iveland
- Village
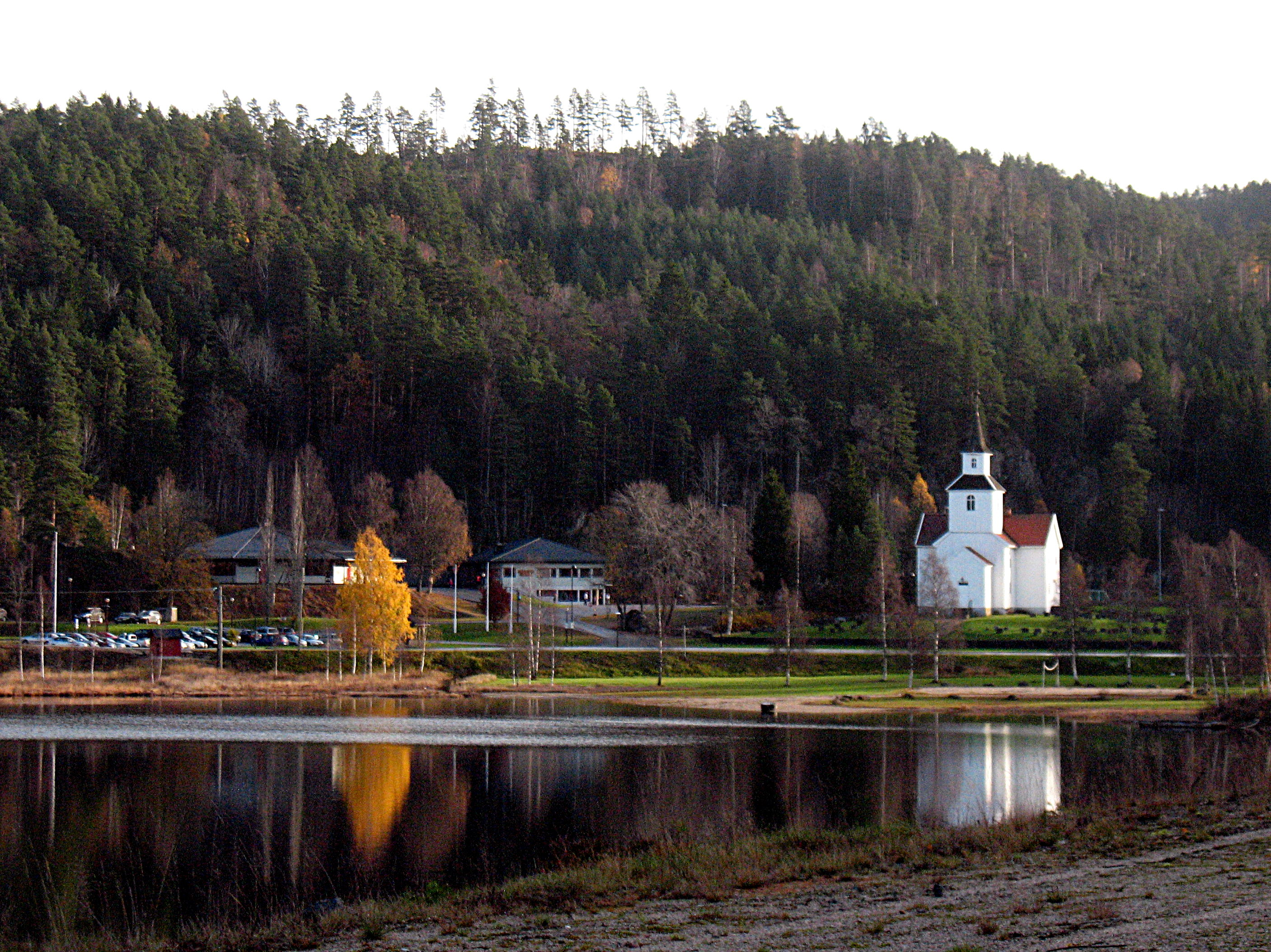
- View of the village church
- Interactive map of Birketveit
- Coordinates: 58.4624°N 07.9118°E
- Country: Norway
- Region: Southern Norway
- County: Agder
- District: Setesdal
- Municipality: Iveland Municipality
- Elevation: 206 m (676 ft)
- Time zone: UTC+01:00 (CET)
  - Summer (DST): UTC+02:00 (CEST)
- Post Code: 4724 Iveland

Birketveit is the administrative centre of Iveland Municipality in Agder county, Norway. The village is located about 8 kilometres (5.0 mi) north of the villages of Skaiå and Bakken, and about 12 kilometres (7.5 mi) to the west of the village of Vatnestrøm. The Iveland Church is located on the south end of the village, and the small lake Birketveitstjønna lies on the west side of the village. The municipal government building is located in Birketveit and it houses a small mineral/mining museum, there is also a municipal sports hall in Birketveit.
