= Grovane =

Village in Vennesla Municipality, Norway

- Village
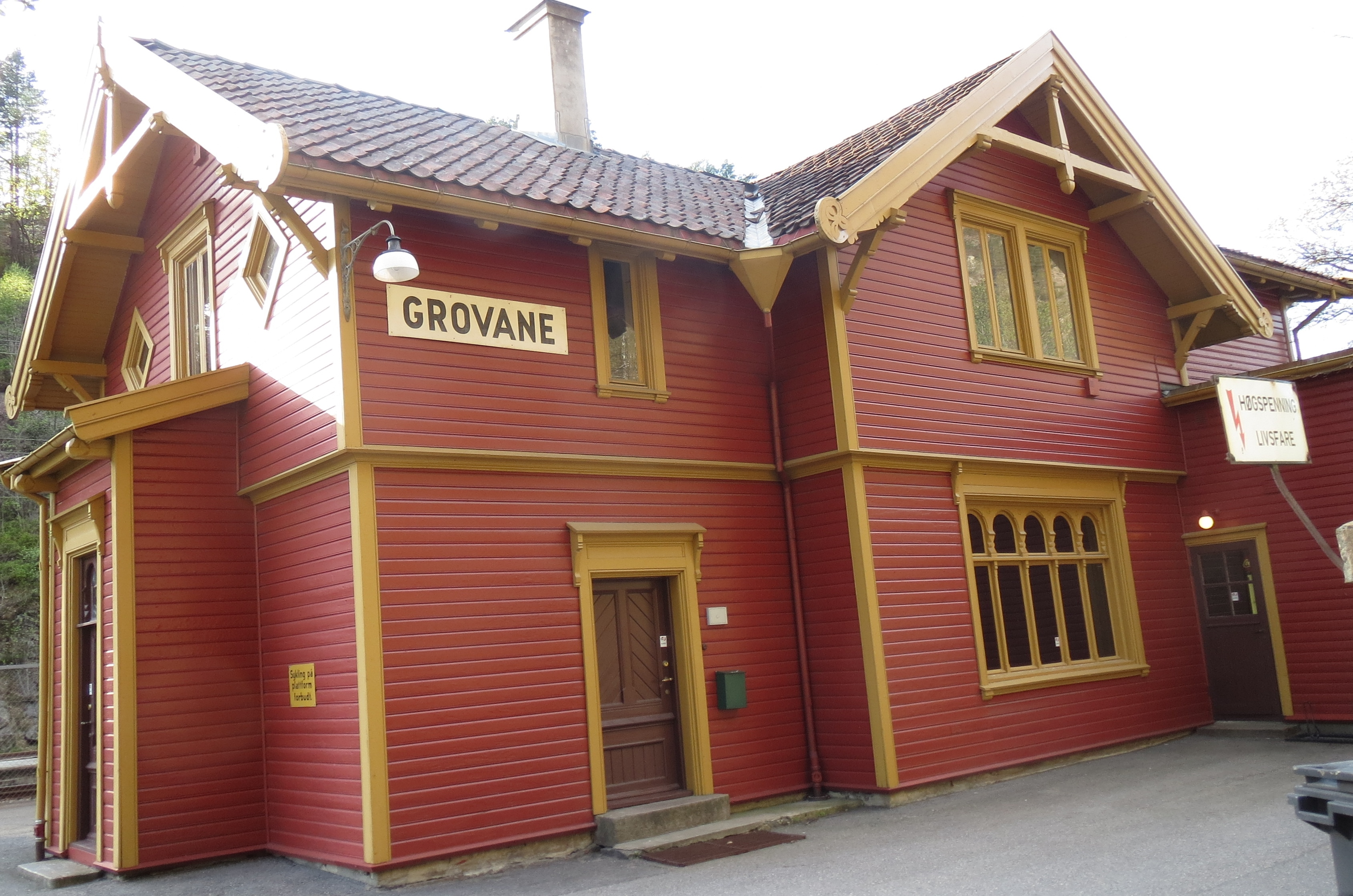
- View of the village railway station
- Interactive map of Grovane
- Coordinates: 58.3012°N 07.9840°E
- Country: Norway
- Region: Southern Norway
- County: Agder
- District: Kristiansand
- Municipality: Vennesla Municipality
- Elevation: 55 m (180 ft)
- Time zone: UTC+01:00 (CET)
  - Summer (DST): UTC+02:00 (CEST)
- Post Code: 4706 Vennesla

Grovane is a village in Vennesla Municipality in Agder county, Norway. The village is located along the shores of the river Otra, about 1.5 kilometres (0.93 mi) north of the large village of Vennesla.

== Railway ==
The Sørlandsbanen railway line runs through the village not stopping at Grovane Station. The station was historically a stop along the Setesdal Line. While the original Setesdal Line was a narrow-gauge railway, Sørlandsbanen was (and still is) a standard gauge railway. After the Sørlandsbanen was completed to Kristiansand in 1938, Grovane station became the terminus station for the Setesdal Line due to the track southward not being double gauge. Freight and passengers had to change trains for onward transport by Sørlandsbanen.

Today, the Setesdal Line (first opened 1885, closed 1962) is a heritage railway and a railway museum with steam trains serving the 8-kilometre (5.0 mi) line between Grovane and Røyknes. Four steam locomotives from 1894 to 1902 are preserved, along with a number of passenger and freight cars.
