= Iveland Municipality =

Municipality in Agder, Norway

Iveland Municipality Iveland kommune
- Municipality
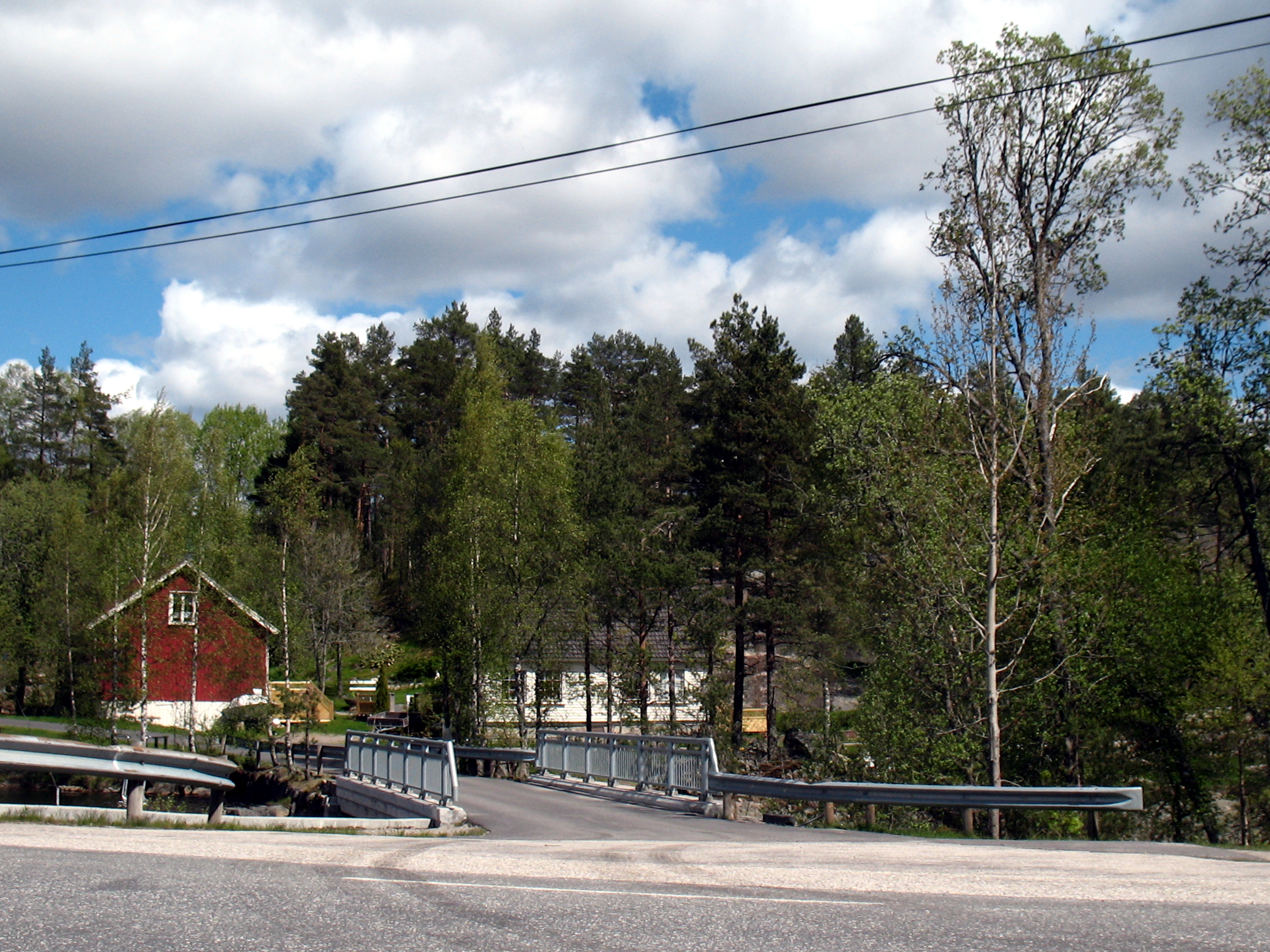
- View of the Vatnestrøm area in Iveland

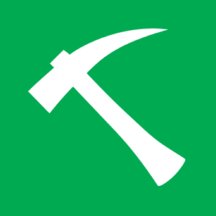
- Flag Coat of arms

- Agder within Norway

- Iveland within Agder
- Coordinates: 58°26′28″N 07°57′21″E
- Country: Norway
- County: Agder
- District: Setesdal
- Established: 1 Jan 1886
  - Preceded by: Hornnes og Iveland Municipality
- Administrative centre: Birketveit

Government
  - Mayor (2023): Jan André Myhren (H)

Area
  - Total: 261.63 km^{2} (101.02 sq mi)
  - Land: 246.07 km^{2} (95.01 sq mi)
  - Water: 15.56 km^{2} (6.01 sq mi) 5.9%
  - Rank: #279 in Norway
- Highest elevation: 558.39 m (1,832.0 ft)

Population (2026)
  - Total: 1,386
  - Rank: #309 in Norway
  - Density: 5.6/km^{2} (15/sq mi)
  - Change (10 years): ▲ +5.2%
- Demonym: Ivdøl

Official language
  - Norwegian form: Neutral
- Time zone: UTC+01:00 (CET)
  - Summer (DST): UTC+02:00 (CEST)
- ISO 3166 code: NO-4218
- Website: Official website

Iveland is a municipality in Agder County, Norway. It is located in the traditional district of Setesdal. The administrative centre of the municipality is the village of Birketveit. Other villages in the municipality include Bakken, Skaiå, and Vatnestrøm.

The 261.63-square-kilometre (101.02 sq mi) municipality is the 279th largest by area out of the 357 municipalities in Norway. Iveland Municipality is the 309th most populous municipality in Norway with a population of 1,386. The municipality's population density is 5.6 inhabitants per square kilometre (15/sq mi) and its population has increased by 5.2% over the previous 10-year period.

== General information ==
The municipality was established on 1 January 1886, when the old Hornnes og Iveland Municipality was split into two municipalities: the southern district (population: 1,103) became the new Iveland Municipality and the northern district (population: 1,113) became the new Hornnes Municipality. The municipal boundaries have not changed since that time.

Historically, this municipality was part of the old Aust-Agder county. On 1 January 2020, the municipality became a part of the newly-formed Agder county (after Aust-Agder and Vest-Agder counties were merged).

=== Name ===
The municipality (originally the parish) is named after the old Iveland farm (Old Norse: Ífuland) since the first Iveland Church was built there. This old farm is now part of the village of Birketveit. The first element is the genitive case of the local river name Ífa which now called the Frøysåna. The river name is probably derived from the word ýr which means "yew" (Taxus baccata). The last element is land which means "land" or "district".

=== Coat of arms ===
The coat of arms was granted on 9 October 1987. The official blazon is "Vert, a hammer bendwise argent" (Norwegian: I grønt en skråstilt sølv hammer). This means the arms have a green field (background) and the charge is a stonemason's hammer. The hammer has a tincture of argent which means it is commonly colored white, but if it is made out of metal, then silver is used. The green color in the field symbolizes the importance of forestry and agriculture in the municipality. The hammer was chosen to symbolize the importance of mining in the area (such as quartz and nickel). The arms were designed by Ulf Skauge. The municipal flag has the same design as the coat of arms.

=== Churches ===
The Church of Norway has one parish (sokn) within Iveland Municipality. It is part of the Otredal prosti (deanery) in the Diocese of Agder og Telemark.

Churches in Iveland Municipality
Parish (sokn)	Church name	Location of the church	Year built
Iveland	Iveland Church	Birketveit	1837

== History ==
Although nothing is found in written sources about Iveland before the 15th century, there is evidence of occupation for thousands of years prior to that. Stone Age implements have been found, which are 4000–5000 years old. A King's road (Norwegian: Kongevegen), which allowed horse travel, went in an east–west direction through the area and was in use as early as the 9th century, and perhaps before. But the first written record of farms created by clearing the land goes back about 600 years.

The Setesdalsbanen was a narrow-gauge steam railway built in 1896, which went across Iveland Municipality on its route between Vennesla and Byglandsfjord. The Setesdal Line's operation was terminated in 1962, and the track was removed between Byglandsfjord and Beihølen. When it was constructed, it revived the lumber industry. Large quantities of planks, poles, and timbers were brought by horse to the Iveland station and forwarded by railroad to Kristiansand. This resulted in better prices, since it provided competition with the floated timber.

Iveland is the known source for Voss water, at an undisclosed aquifer near Vatnestrøm.

== Geography ==
Iveland Municipality is the smallest municipality in Setesdal. The Otra river, which flows through Iveland, is the largest river in the Sørlandet district. Towards the east it borders on lake Ogge. The highest point in the municipality is the 558.39-metre (1,832.0 ft) tall mountain Rubbeheia, near the northern border with Evje og Hornnes Municipality.

The municipality is bordered in the northwest by Evje og Hornnes Municipality, in the northeast and east by Birkenes Municipality, and in the south and west by Vennesla Municipality. The municipality has three population centers: Birketveit, Vatnestrøm, and Skaiå.

The Iveland area includes several hundred old mines. These pegmatite mines and quarries yield more than 100 different minerals, including minerals containing rare-earth elements, beryllium, scandium, uranium, and thorium.

== Government ==
Iveland Municipality is responsible for primary education (through 10th grade), outpatient health services, senior citizen services, welfare and other social services, zoning, economic development, and municipal roads and utilities. The municipality is governed by a municipal council of directly elected representatives. The mayor is indirectly elected by a vote of the municipal council. The municipality is under the jurisdiction of the Agder District Court and the Agder Court of Appeal.

=== Municipal council ===
The municipal council (Kommunestyre) of Iveland Municipality is made up of 17 representatives that are elected to four year terms. The tables below show the current and historical composition of the council by political party.

Iveland kommunestyre 2023–2027
Party name (in Norwegian)	Number of representatives
Labour Party (Arbeiderpartiet)	2
Progress Party (Fremskrittspartiet)	2
Conservative Party (Høyre)	5
Christian Democratic Party (Kristelig Folkeparti)	5
Centre Party (Senterpartiet)	3
Total number of members:	17

Iveland kommunestyre 2019–2023
Party name (in Norwegian)	Number of representatives
Labour Party (Arbeiderpartiet)	2
Progress Party (Fremskrittspartiet)	1
Conservative Party (Høyre)	4
Christian Democratic Party (Kristelig Folkeparti)	4
Centre Party (Senterpartiet)	6
Total number of members:	17

Iveland kommunestyre 2015–2019
Party name (in Norwegian)	Number of representatives
Labour Party (Arbeiderpartiet)	3
Progress Party (Fremskrittspartiet)	1
Conservative Party (Høyre)	1
Christian Democratic Party (Kristelig Folkeparti)	6
Centre Party (Senterpartiet)	5
Liberal Party (Venstre)	1
Total number of members:	17

Iveland kommunestyre 2011–2015
Party name (in Norwegian)	Number of representatives
Labour Party (Arbeiderpartiet)	3
Progress Party (Fremskrittspartiet)	2
Conservative Party (Høyre)	2
Christian Democratic Party (Kristelig Folkeparti)	3
Centre Party (Senterpartiet)	5
Liberal Party (Venstre)	2
Total number of members:	17

Iveland kommunestyre 2007–2011
Party name (in Norwegian)	Number of representatives
Labour Party (Arbeiderpartiet)	3
Progress Party (Fremskrittspartiet)	3
Conservative Party (Høyre)	2
Christian Democratic Party (Kristelig Folkeparti)	3
Centre Party (Senterpartiet)	4
Liberal Party (Venstre)	2
Total number of members:	17

Iveland kommunestyre 2003–2007
Party name (in Norwegian)	Number of representatives
Labour Party (Arbeiderpartiet)	3
Progress Party (Fremskrittspartiet)	2
Conservative Party (Høyre)	1
Christian Democratic Party (Kristelig Folkeparti)	3
Centre Party (Senterpartiet)	5
Liberal Party (Venstre)	3
Total number of members:	17

Iveland kommunestyre 1999–2003
Party name (in Norwegian)	Number of representatives
Labour Party (Arbeiderpartiet)	3
Progress Party (Fremskrittspartiet)	1
Conservative Party (Høyre)	1
Christian Democratic Party (Kristelig Folkeparti)	4
Centre Party (Senterpartiet)	5
Liberal Party (Venstre)	3
Total number of members:	17

Iveland kommunestyre 1995–1999
Party name (in Norwegian)	Number of representatives
Labour Party (Arbeiderpartiet)	4
Conservative Party (Høyre)	2
Christian Democratic Party (Kristelig Folkeparti)	4
Centre Party (Senterpartiet)	5
Liberal Party (Venstre)	2
Total number of members:	17

Iveland kommunestyre 1991–1995
Party name (in Norwegian)	Number of representatives
Labour Party (Arbeiderpartiet)	4
Conservative Party (Høyre)	2
Christian Democratic Party (Kristelig Folkeparti)	5
Centre Party (Senterpartiet)	6
Total number of members:	17

Iveland kommunestyre 1987–1991
Party name (in Norwegian)	Number of representatives
Labour Party (Arbeiderpartiet)	7
Conservative Party (Høyre)	3
Christian Democratic Party (Kristelig Folkeparti)	4
Centre Party (Senterpartiet)	3
Total number of members:	17

Iveland kommunestyre 1983–1987
Party name (in Norwegian)	Number of representatives
Labour Party (Arbeiderpartiet)	5
Progress Party (Fremskrittspartiet)	1
Conservative Party (Høyre)	3
Christian Democratic Party (Kristelig Folkeparti)	4
Centre Party (Senterpartiet)	4
Total number of members:	17

Iveland kommunestyre 1979–1983
Party name (in Norwegian)	Number of representatives
Labour Party (Arbeiderpartiet)	5
Conservative Party (Høyre)	3
Christian Democratic Party (Kristelig Folkeparti)	4
Centre Party (Senterpartiet)	4
Joint list of the Liberal Party (Venstre) and New People's Party (Nye Folkepartiet)	1
Total number of members:	17

Iveland kommunestyre 1975–1979
Party name (in Norwegian)	Number of representatives
Labour Party (Arbeiderpartiet)	5
Christian Democratic Party (Kristelig Folkeparti)	3
Centre Party (Senterpartiet)	6
Joint list of the Liberal Party (Venstre) and New People's Party (Nye Folkepartiet)	3
Total number of members:	17

Iveland kommunestyre 1971–1975
Party name (in Norwegian)	Number of representatives
Labour Party (Arbeiderpartiet)	5
Centre Party (Senterpartiet)	7
Liberal Party (Venstre)	5
Total number of members:	17

Iveland kommunestyre 1967–1971
Party name (in Norwegian)	Number of representatives
Labour Party (Arbeiderpartiet)	5
Centre Party (Senterpartiet)	7
Liberal Party (Venstre)	5
Total number of members:	17

Iveland kommunestyre 1963–1967
Party name (in Norwegian)	Number of representatives
Labour Party (Arbeiderpartiet)	5
Centre Party (Senterpartiet)	7
Liberal Party (Venstre)	5
Total number of members:	17

Iveland herredsstyre 1959–1963
Party name (in Norwegian)	Number of representatives
Labour Party (Arbeiderpartiet)	5
Centre Party (Senterpartiet)	7
Liberal Party (Venstre)	5
Total number of members:	17

Iveland herredsstyre 1955–1959
Party name (in Norwegian)	Number of representatives
Labour Party (Arbeiderpartiet)	5
Farmers' Party (Bondepartiet)	6
Liberal Party (Venstre)	6
Total number of members:	17

Iveland herredsstyre 1951–1955
Party name (in Norwegian)	Number of representatives
Labour Party (Arbeiderpartiet)	4
Farmers' Party (Bondepartiet)	6
Liberal Party (Venstre)	6
Total number of members:	16

Iveland herredsstyre 1947–1951
Party name (in Norwegian)	Number of representatives
Labour Party (Arbeiderpartiet)	5
Farmers' Party (Bondepartiet)	5
Liberal Party (Venstre)	6
Total number of members:	16

Iveland herredsstyre 1945–1947
Party name (in Norwegian)	Number of representatives
Labour Party (Arbeiderpartiet)	6
Farmers' Party (Bondepartiet)	4
Liberal Party (Venstre)	6
Total number of members:	16

Iveland herredsstyre 1937–1941*
Party name (in Norwegian)	Number of representatives
Labour Party (Arbeiderpartiet)	3
Farmers' Party (Bondepartiet)	5
Liberal Party (Venstre)	6
List of workers, fishermen, and small farmholders (Arbeidere, fiskere, småbrukere liste)	2
Total number of members:	16
Note: Due to the German occupation of Norway during World War II, no elections were held for new municipal councils until after the war ended in 1945.

=== Mayors ===
The mayor (Norwegian: ordfører) of Iveland Municipality is the political leader of the municipality and the chairperson of the municipal council. The following people have held this position:

- 1886–1888: Tellef Frøysaa
- 1888–1898: Anders Christensen Skaiaa (V)
- 1898–1901: Anders J. Løeland
- 1901–1907: Anders Christensen Skaiaa (V)
- 1907–1910: Tobias Fjermedal (V)
- 1910–1913: Anders Christensen Skaiaa (V)
- 1913–1917: Tobias Fjermedal (V)
- 1917–1922: Salve Eieland (V)
- 1922–1928: Tomas Belland (V)
- 1928–1931: Thore Homme (V)
- 1931–1934: Tomas Belland (V)
- 1934–1942: Einar Iveland (V)
- 1942–1945: Aslak Fjermedal (NS)
- 1945–1950: Einar Iveland (V)
- 1950–1951: Jon Mølland (Bp)
- 1951–1959: Tomas Belland (V)
- 1959–1965: Torbjørn Iveland (V)
- 1965–1971: Olav Andreas Vatnestrøm (Sp)
- 1971–1979: Karstein Lie (Sp)
- 1979–1987: Torleif Vatnestrøm (Sp)
- 1987–1995: Brynjulf Aagesen (KrF)
- 1995–2011: Ole Magne Omdal (Sp)
- 2011–2021: Gro-Anita Mykjåland (Sp)
- 2021–2023: Terje Møkjåland (KrF)
- 2023–present: Jan André Myhren (H)

== Notable people ==
- Einar Iveland (1892 in Iveland – 1975), a politician who held various positions on Iveland's municipal council from 1933-1950
- Anne Gerd Eieland (born 1982 in Iveland), Norway's third best female high jumper
