= Evje =

Evje may refer to:

== Places ==
- Evje, Akershus, a village area in Bærum Municipality in Akershus county, Norway
- Evje (village), a village within Evje og Hornnes Municipality in Agder county, Norway
- Evje og Hornnes Municipality, a municipality in Agder county, Norway
- Evje Municipality, a former municipality in the old Aust-Agder county, Norway
- Evje og Vegusdal Municipality, a former municipality in the old Aust-Agder county, Norway
- Evje Church, a church in Evje og Hornnes Municipality in Agder county, Norway

== People ==
- Thoralf Evje (1902-1976), a Norwegian judge, civil servant, and politician for the Labour Party
- Ursula Evje (born 1944), a Norwegian politician for the Progress Party
- Evje van Dampen, a fictional character played by German comedian Hape Kerkeling
