= Vegusdal =

Vegusdal may refer to:

== Places ==
- Vegusdal (village), a small village in Birkenes Municipality in Agder county, Norway
- Vegusdal Church, a church in Birkenes Municipality in Agder county, Norway
- Vegusdal Chapel, a small chapel in Birkenes Municipality in Agder county, Norway
- Vegusdal Municipality, a former municipality in the old Aust-Agder county, Norway

== See also ==
- Evje og Vegusdal Municipality
