= Geir Barvik =

Norwegian civil servant (born 1958)

Director-General of the Directorate of Integration and Diversity
- In office 2010–2016
- Preceded by: Osmund Kaldheim
- Succeeded by: Libe Rieber-Mohn

Managing Director of the Norwegian State Housing Bank
- In office 2001–2010
- Preceded by: Lars Wilhelmsen
- Succeeded by: Bård Øistensen

Personal details
- Born: 19 May 1958 (age 68) Bø Municipality

Geir Barvik (born 19 May 1958, in Bø) is a Norwegian civil servant. He served as Managing Director of the Norwegian State Housing Bank from 2001 to 2010 and as Director-General of the Directorate of Integration and Diversity from 2010 to 2016. From 2016 he is a Director in the Ministry of Justice and Public Security.

== Career ==
Barvik worked at the Norwegian State Housing Bank and in the Ministry of Local Government and Regional Development, where he was a Principal Officer from 1991, Assistant Director General from 1992 and Deputy Director General from 1994.

He was appointed as Managing Director of the Norwegian State Housing Bank by the King-in-Council in 2001, and held the position until 2010. In 2010 he was appointed by the King-in-Council as the Director General of the Directorate of Integration and Diversity. In 2016 he was succeeded by Libe Rieber-Mohn.

== Background ==
Barvik grew up in Bø, and lives in Asker. He is married and has two children. He was formerly a member of the Socialist Left Party, but quit the party due to its opposition to the EU in the early 1990s.

Civic offices
Preceded by Lars Wilhelmsen	Managing Director of the Norwegian State Housing Bank; 2001–2010	Succeeded by Bård Øistensen
Preceded by Osmund Kaldheim	Director General of the Directorate of Integration and Diversity; 2010–2016	Succeeded by Libe Rieber-Mohn
