= Lars Wilhelmsen =

Norwegian civil servant (born 1946)

Lars Wilhelmsen (born 7 December 1946) is a Norwegian civil servant.

He was born in Bergen as the son of Leif Wilhelmsen, and took the cand.philol. degree at the University of Oslo in 1972. He was hired as deputy under-secretary of State in the Ministry of Local Government and Labour in 1988. In 1994 he became the managing director of the Norwegian State Housing Bank. He was then the director of Aetat from 2001 to 2002, before resigning to return to the ministries. Per Engebretsen was acting director for some months until Inger-Johanne Stokke was hired as the new director. Wilhelmsen now works for the permanent under-secretary of State in the Ministry of Labour and Social Inclusion. In 2010 he was the acting director of the Directorate of Integration and Diversity.

Civic offices
Preceded by Ivar Leveraas	Director of the Norwegian State Housing Bank; 1994–2001	Succeeded by Geir Barvik
Preceded by Jon Blaalid (acting)	Director of Aetat; 2001–2002	Succeeded by Per Engebretsen (acting)
Preceded by Osmund Kaldheim	Director of the Directorate of Integration and Diversity; 2010 (acting)	Succeeded by Geir Barvik
