= LIBE (disambiguation) =

LIBE or Libe may refer to:

- LIBE, the Committee on Civil Liberties, Justice and Home Affairs, a standing committee of the European Parliament
- Liberia, a country in western Africa
- Libé, informal name for Libération, a French newspaper
- Lithium beryllide, a chemical compound
- Libe Manor, former name of Biksēre Manor, a manor house near Madona, Latvia

People

- Libe Washburn (1874–1940), baseball player
- Libe Rieber-Mohn (born 1965), Norwegian politician
- Libe Barer (born 1991), American actress
