= Bård Øistensen =

Norwegian civil servant

Bård Øistensen (born 1951) is a Norwegian civil servant.

He holds a cand.sociol. degree from the University of Oslo. He worked in the housing etat of Oslo municipality, and also as a researcher in Byggforsk, before being hired as director of Region East in the Norwegian State Housing Bank in 2001. He was later director of strategy and vice chief executive. In 2010 the chief executive Geir Barvik was appointed as the director of the Directorate of Integration and Diversity, and Øistensen served as acting chief executive. In December 2010 he got the position as chief executive on a permanent basis.

Civic offices
Preceded by Geir Barvik	Chief executive of the Norwegian State Housing Bank; 2010–present	Incumbent
