= Jørn Skille =

Norwegian civil servant

Jørn Skille (11 December 1942 – 29 June 2008) was a Norwegian civil servant.

He was born in Oslo, and took a military education. He was an officer in the Royal Norwegian Air Force from 1962 to 1976 and worked in the Ministry of Defence from 1976. He then moved to the Ministry of Government Administration and Consumer Affairs in 1977, where he was promoted to assistant secretary in 1980. He was a deputy under-secretary of state in the Ministry of Government Administration from 1989 to 1995.

From 1986 to 1989 he worked in Televerket, from 1995 to 1998 he was vice president in Arbeidsgiverforeningen NAVO and from 1999 to 2004 he worked in Statskonsult. He finished his career with four years as the Government Director of Personnel, leading an office in the Ministry of Government Administration. As such he was also a member of the National Wages Board. He was succeeded by Siri Røine in early 2008.

Skille was married and had children. He died in late June 2008 due to complications from heart surgery.

Civic offices
Preceded by Per Kristian Knutsen (acting)	Government Director of Personnel of Norway; 2004–2008	Succeeded by Siri Røine
