= Evje og Vegusdal Municipality =

Former municipality in Aust-Agder, Norway

Evje og Vegusdal Municipality Evje og Vegusdal herred
- Former municipality
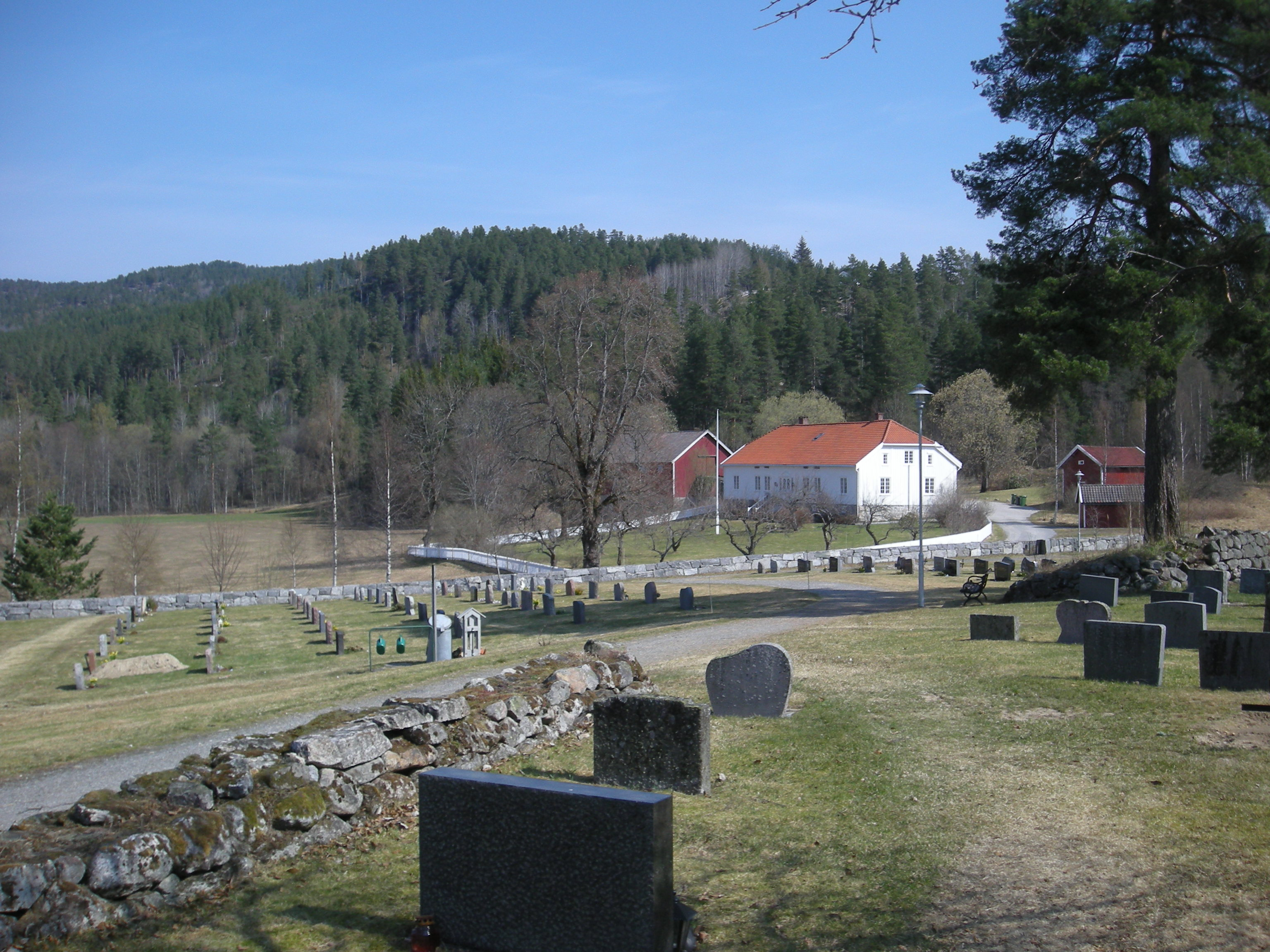
- Evje Church cemetery and farm

- Aust-Agder within Norway

- Evje og Vegusdal within Aust-Agder
- Coordinates: 58.5897°N 08.0104°E
- Country: Norway
- County: Aust-Agder
- District: Setesdal
- Established: 1 Jan 1838
  - Created as: Formannskapsdistrikt
- Disestablished: 1 Jan 1877
  - Succeeded by: Evje Municipality and Vegusdal Municipality
- Administrative centre: Evje

Government
  - Mayor (1870-1876): Salve E. Bjoraa

Area (upon dissolution)
  - Total: 510 km^{2} (200 sq mi)
- Highest elevation: 650 m (2,130 ft)

Population (1877)
  - Total: 1,805
  - Density: 3.5/km^{2} (9.2/sq mi)
- Demonym(s): Evdøl; Veggdøl
- Time zone: UTC+01:00 (CET)
  - Summer (DST): UTC+02:00 (CEST)
- ISO 3166 code: NO-0934

Evje og Vegusdal is a former municipality in the old Aust-Agder county, Norway. The 510-square-kilometre (200 sq mi) municipality existed from 1838 until its dissolution in 1877. The area is now divided between Evje og Hornnes Municipality and Birkenes Municipality in the traditional district of Setesdal in Agder county. The administrative centre was the village of Evje where the Evje Church is located.

== General information ==
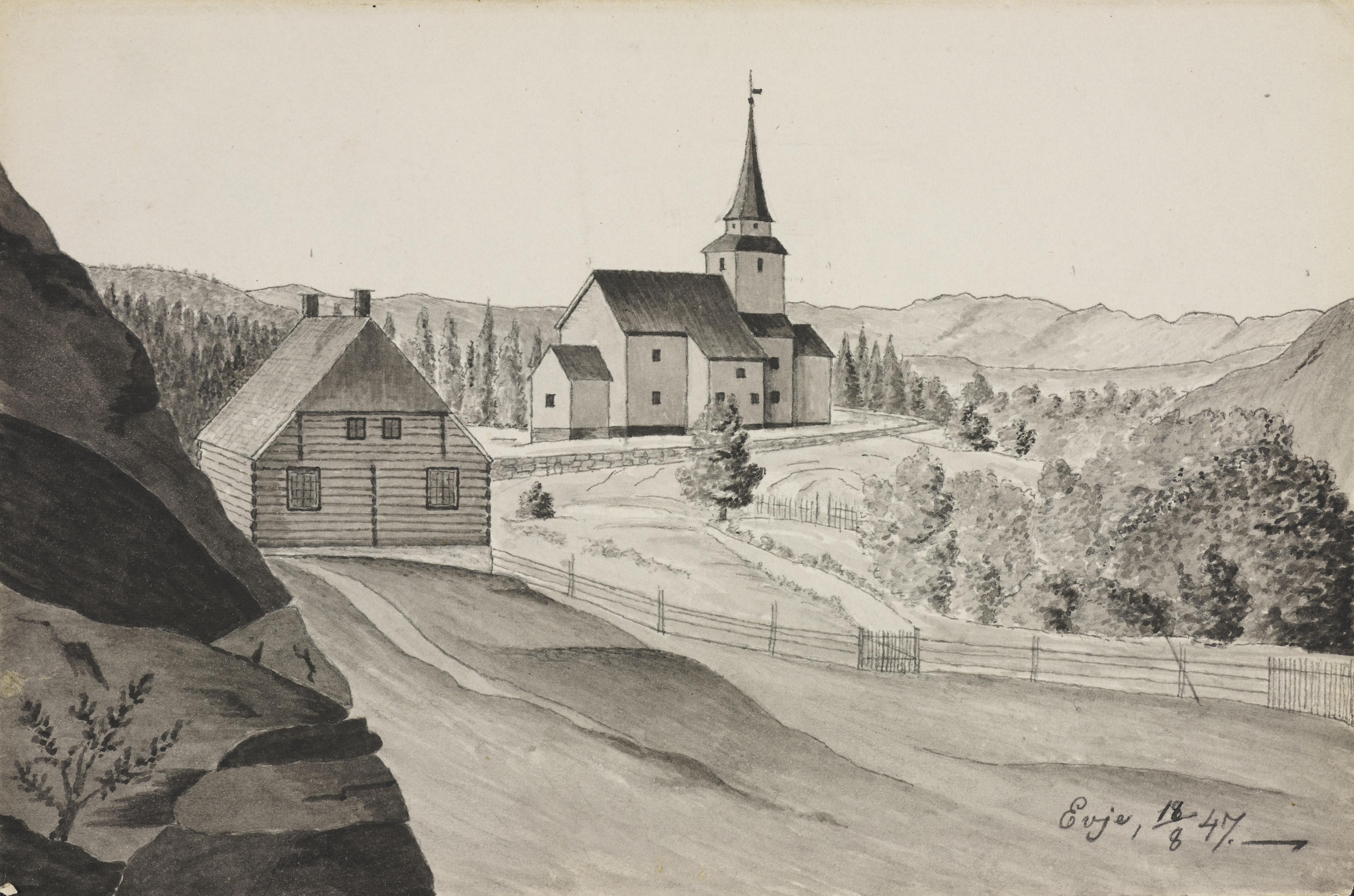
View of Evje Church (c. 1847)

The parish of Evje og Vegusdal was established as a municipality on 1 January 1838 (see formannskapsdistrikt law). According to the 1835 census the municipality had a population of 1,627. On 1 January 1877, Evje og Vegusdal Municipality was divided to create two separate municipalities: the northwestern district (population: 870) became the new Evje Municipality and the southeastern district (population: 935) became the new Vegusdal Municipality. These two municipalities later became parts of Evje og Hornnes Municipality and Birkenes Municipality respectively.

=== Name ===
The parishes of Evje and Vegusdal were merged in 1838 and the new, resulting municipality was given the compound name Evje og Vegusdal, literally meaning "Evje and Vegusdal".

The parish of Evje is named after the old Evje farm (Old Norse: Efja) since the first Evje Church was built there. The name is identical to the word efja which means "backwater" or "mud" (likely referring to a shallow, backwater part of the local river Otra).

The parish of Vegusdal is named after the old Vegusdal farm (Old Norse: Veikolfsdalr) since the first Vegusdal Church was built there. The first element is derived from the old male name, Veikolfr. The male name itself was a compound name with the first component Veik- coming from veikr which means "weak" and the second component -olfr was a variant form of the more common male name Úlfr (also spelled Ulfr, from Old Norse úlfr, ulfr "wolf"; cf. Icelandic Úlfur and Faroese Úlvur). The last element of the name is dalr which means "valley" or "dale". Thus this is the "valley of Weak-Ulfr (or Weak-Wolf)".

=== Churches ===
The Church of Norway had one parish (sokn) within Evje og Vegusdal Municipality. At the time of the municipal dissolution, it was part of the Evje prestegjeld and the Otredal prosti (deanery) in the Diocese of Agder.

Churches in Evje og Vegusdal Municipality
| Parish (sokn) | Church name | Location of the church | Year built |
|---|---|---|---|
| Evje | Evje Church | Evje | 1891 |
| Evje | Vegusdal Church | Engesland | 1867 |

== Geography ==
The highest point in the municipality was the 650-metre (2,130 ft) tall mountain Myklivarden, located just east of the village of Gautestad. Bygland Municipality was located to the north, Mykland Municipality was located to the north and east, Herefoss Municipality was located to the southeast, Birkenes Municipality was located to the south, and Hornnes og Iveland Municipality was located to the west.

== Government ==
While it existed, Evje og Vegusdal Municipality was governed by a municipal council of directly elected representatives. The mayor was indirectly elected by a vote of the municipal council. The municipality was under the jurisdiction of the Setesdal District Court and the Agder Court of Appeal.

=== Mayors ===
The mayor (Nynorsk: ordførar) of Evje og Vegusdal Municipality was the political leader of the municipality and the chairperson of the municipal council. The following people have held this position:

- 1838–1839: Notto Jørgensen Tvedt
- 1839–1839: Baard Christensen Joreid
- 1840–1840: Dr. Bjelke
- 1840–1841: Gunder Salvesen Haugland
- 1842–1845: Rev. Knud Olaf Knutzen
- 1846–1849: Gunstein Olsen Tvedt
- 1850–1855: Ole Evensen Kleveland
- 1856–1857: Jens Nicolai Egeberg
- 1857–1861: Ole Evensen Kleveland
- 1862–1863: Salve E. Bjoraa
- 1864–1865: Ole Evensen Dovland
- 1866–1866: Ole Gundersen Skrædderaas
- 1866–1870: Rev. G.F. Dietrichson
- 1870–1876: Salve E. Bjoraa

== See also ==
- List of former municipalities of Norway
