= Ivar Leveraas =

Norwegian politician

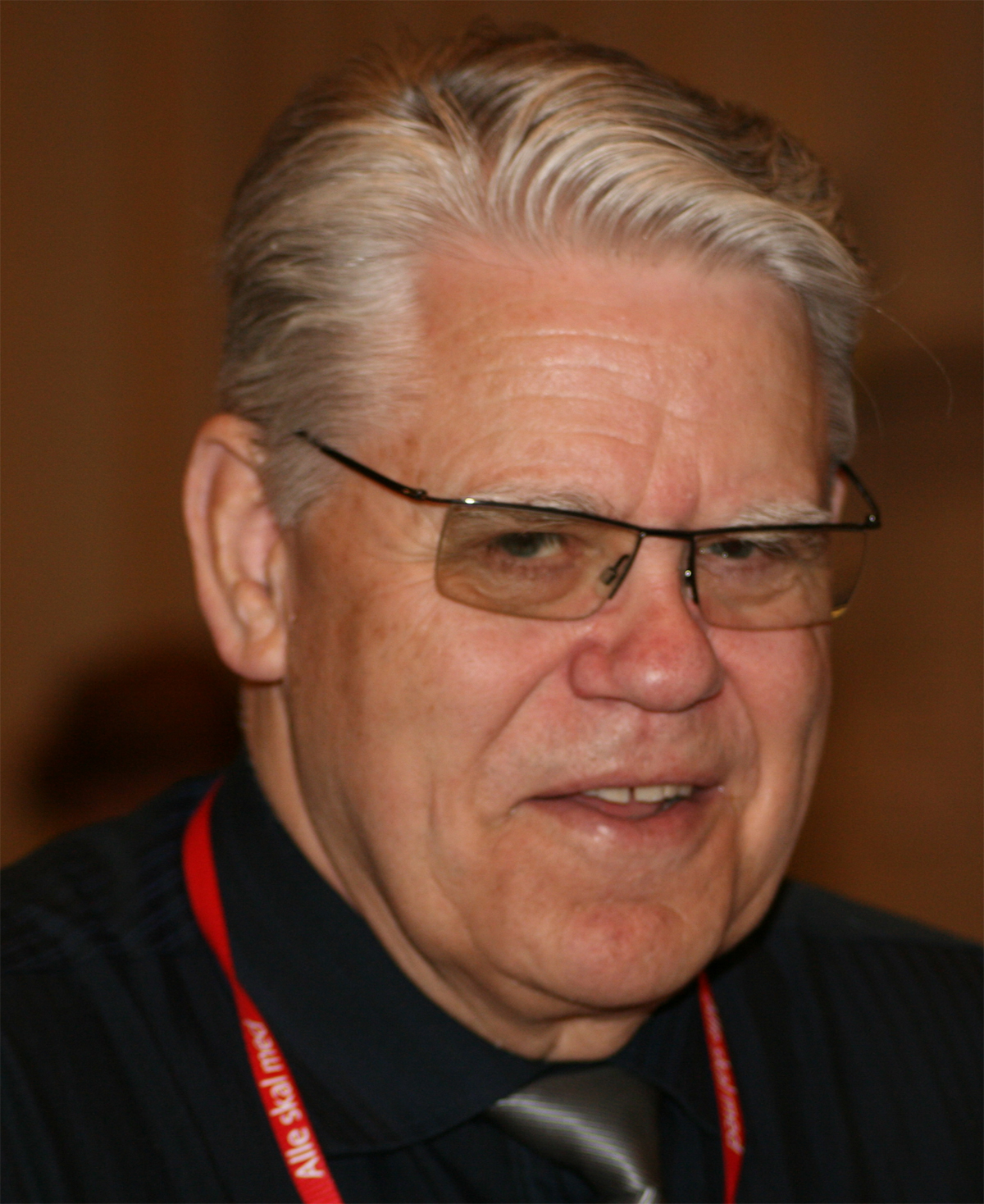
Ivar Leveraas

Ivar Leveraas (born 17 July 1939) is a Norwegian civil servant and politician for the Labour Party.

Leveraas was born in Haugesund. A mechanic by education, he worked as a secretary in Arbeidernes Opplysningsforbund (AOF) from 1970 to 1975. From 1975 to 1986 he was the secretary of the Labour party. He then was CEO of the Norwegian State Housing Bank from 1986 to 1994 and director of the Norwegian Labour Inspection Authority from 1994 to 2006. In 2006, Leveraas was appointed by the Government as leader of The National Council for Senior Citizens. He is now in his second term for the council.

He has also graduated from the military academy and has a financial-administrative qualification and a masters in management and leadership.

He was awarded the King's Medal of Merit in gold in 2006.

Party political offices
Preceded by Ronald Bye	Party secretary of the Labour Party; 1975–1986	Succeeded by Thorbjørn Jagland
Civic offices
Preceded by Bjarne Orten	CEO of the Norwegian State Housing Bank; 1986–1994	Succeeded by Lars Wilhelmsen
Preceded by Dagfinn Habberstad	Director of the Norwegian Labour Inspection Authority; 1994–2006	Succeeded by Ingrid Finboe Svendsen
Preceded by Astrid Nøklebye Heiberg	Leader of the National Council for Senior Citizens; 2006–2013	Succeeded by
