= Orten =

Orten is a surname. Notable people with the surname include:

- Bjarne Orten (1919–2011), Norwegian civil servant
- Jiří Orten (1919–1941), Czech poet
- Helge Orten (born 1966), Norwegian politician

== See also ==
- Jiří Orten Award, a Czech literary prize
