= Dagfinn Habberstad =

Norwegian trade unionist and civil servant

Dagfinn Habberstad (born 18 December 1941) is a Norwegian trade unionist and civil servant.

He was born in Asker. He was a leader of the trade union Norsk Tjenestemannslag from 1978 to 1988. From 1988 to 1994 he served as director of the Norwegian Labour Inspection Authority. After this he has been an advisor in the same organization.

Preceded by Odd Højdahl	Director of the Norwegian Labour Inspection Authority; 1988–1994	Succeeded by Ivar Leveraas
