= Nils Mugaas =

Nils Rustung Mugaas (1921–1992) was a Norwegian trade unionist and civil servant.

He chaired Statstjenestemannskartellet from 1969 to 1974 and Statens Personaldirektorat from 1974 to 1990. Statens Personaldirektorat was abolished after 1990, but was succeeded by a department in the Ministry of Government Administration and Labour led by a Government Director of Personnel.

He was born in Ullensvang Municipality. He grew up in Ostereidet, and resided in Bærum Municipality for the last 24 years of his life. Mugaas was politically active in the Labour Party.

Civic offices
Preceded by Bjarne Døhlen	Director of Statens Personaldirektorat; 1974–1990	Succeeded by directorate replaced by new Government Director of Personnel (inaugural director: Aud Blankholm)
