= Evje Municipality =

Former municipality in Aust-Agder, Norway

Evje Municipality Evje herad
- Former municipality
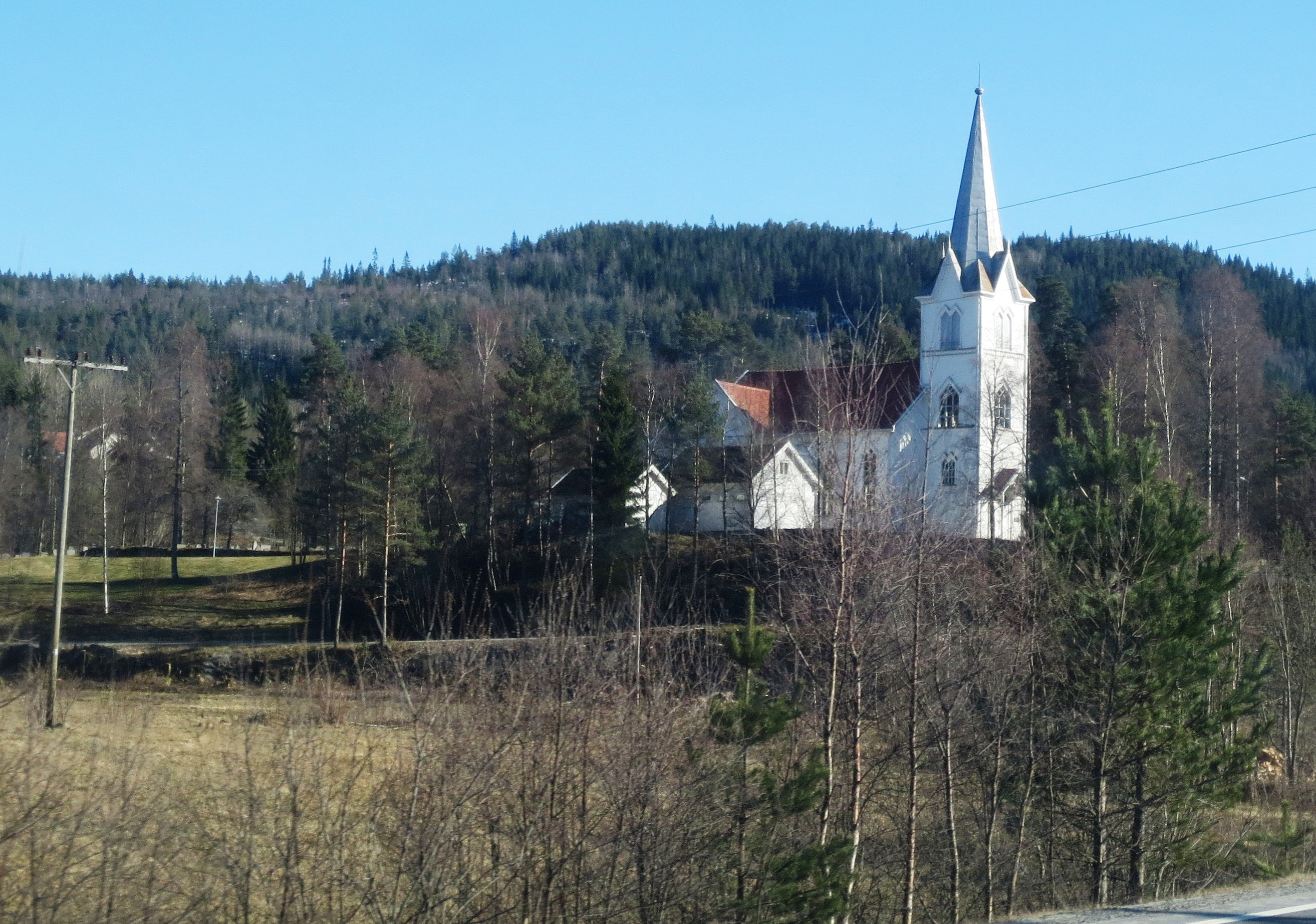
- View of the local church

- Aust-Agder within Norway

- Evje within Aust-Agder
- Coordinates: 58°35′06″N 07°48′30″E
- Country: Norway
- County: Aust-Agder
- District: Setesdal
- Established: 1 Jan 1877
  - Preceded by: Evje og Vegusdal Municipality
- Disestablished: 1 Jan 1960
  - Succeeded by: Evje og Hornnes Municipality
- Administrative centre: Evje

Government
  - Mayor (1945-1959): Torvald Haavardstad (Ap)

Area (upon dissolution)
  - Total: 172.5 km^{2} (66.6 sq mi)
  - Rank: #418 in Norway
- Highest elevation: 650 m (2,130 ft)

Population (1959)
  - Total: 1,649
  - Rank: #537 in Norway
  - Density: 9.6/km^{2} (25/sq mi)
  - Change (10 years): ▲ +3%
- Demonym: Evdøl

Official language
  - Norwegian form: Nynorsk
- Time zone: UTC+01:00 (CET)
  - Summer (DST): UTC+02:00 (CEST)
- ISO 3166 code: NO-0937

Evje is a former municipality in the old Aust-Agder county, Norway. The 172.5-square-kilometre (66.6 sq mi) municipality existed from 1877 until its dissolution in 1960. The area is now part of Evje og Hornnes Municipality in the traditional district of Setesdal in Agder county. The administrative centre was the village of Evje where the Evje Church is located. Other villages in the municipality included Gautestad, Flatebygd, Åneland, and the Evjemoen military camp.

Prior to its dissolution in 1960, the 172.5-square-kilometre (66.6 sq mi) municipality was the 418th largest by area out of the 743 municipalities in Norway. Evje Municipality was the 537th most populous municipality in Norway with a population of about 1,649. The municipality's population density was 9.6 inhabitants per square kilometre (25/sq mi) and its population had increased by 3% over the previous 10-year period.

== General information ==
The municipality of Evje was created on 1 January 1877 when the old Evje og Vegusdal Municipality was divided into two separate municipaltiies: the northwestern district (population: 870) became the new Evje Municipality and the southeastern district (population: 935) became the new Vegusdal Municipality.

During the 1960s, there were many municipal mergers across Norway due to the work of the Schei Committee. On 1 January 1960, Evje Municipality (population: 1,646) was merged with the neighboring Hornnes Municipality (population: 1,280) to form the new Evje og Hornnes Municipality.

=== Name ===
The municipality (originally the parish) is named after the old Evje farm (Old Norse: Efja) since the first Evje Church was built there. The name is identical to the word efja which means "backwater" or "mud" (likely referring to a shallow, backwater part of the local river Otra).

=== Churches ===
The Church of Norway had one parish (sokn) within Evje Municipality. At the time of the municipal dissolution, it was part of the Evje prestegjeld and the Otredal prosti (deanery) in the Diocese of Agder.

Churches in Evje Municipality
Parish (sokn)	Church name	Location of the church	Year built
Evje	Evje Church	Evje	1891

== Geography ==
The municipality was located on the east side of the river Otra in the southern part of Setesdal. The lake Høvringsvatnet is located about 10 kilometres (6.2 mi) northeast of the village of Evje. The highest point in the municipality was the 650-metre (2,130 ft) tall mountain Myklivarden, located just east of the village of Gautestad. Bygland Municipality was located to the north, Mykland Municipality was located to the northeast, Vegusdal Municipality was located to the east, Iveland Municipality was located to the south, and Hornnes Municipality was located to the west.

== Government ==
While it existed, Evje Municipality was responsible for primary education (through 10th grade), outpatient health services, senior citizen services, welfare and other social services, zoning, economic development, and municipal roads and utilities. The municipality was governed by a municipal council of directly elected representatives. The mayor was indirectly elected by a vote of the municipal council. The municipality was under the jurisdiction of the Setesdal District Court and the Agder Court of Appeal.

=== Municipal council ===
The municipal council (Herredsstyre) of Evje Municipality was made up of 17 representatives that were elected to four year terms. The tables below show the historical composition of the council by political party.

Evje heradsstyre 1955–1959
Party name (in Nynorsk)	Number of representatives
Labour Party (Arbeidarpartiet)	11
Christian Democratic Party (Kristeleg Folkeparti)	2
Farmers' Party (Bondepartiet)	2
Liberal Party (Venstre)	2
Total number of members:	17
Note: On 1 January 1960, Evje Municipality became part of Evje og Hornnes Municipality.

Evje heradsstyre 1951–1955
Party name (in Nynorsk)	Number of representatives
Labour Party (Arbeidarpartiet)	10
Christian Democratic Party (Kristeleg Folkeparti)	2
Joint List(s) of Non-Socialist Parties (Borgarlege Felleslister)	4
Total number of members:	16

Evje heradsstyre 1947–1951
Party name (in Nynorsk)	Number of representatives
Labour Party (Arbeidarpartiet)	8
Communist Party (Kommunistiske Parti)	2
Christian Democratic Party (Kristeleg Folkeparti)	2
Joint List(s) of Non-Socialist Parties (Borgarlege Felleslister)	4
Total number of members:	16

Evje heradsstyre 1945–1947
Party name (in Nynorsk)	Number of representatives
Labour Party (Arbeidarpartiet)	10
Communist Party (Kommunistiske Parti)	2
Farmers' Party (Bondepartiet)	1
Joint list of the Liberal Party (Venstre) and the Radical People's Party (Radikale Folkepartiet)	3
Total number of members:	16

Evje herredsstyre 1937–1941*
Party name (in Norwegian)	Number of representatives
Labour Party (Arbeiderpartiet)	10
Farmers' Party (Bondepartiet)	2
Liberal Party (Venstre)	4
Total number of members:	16
Note: Due to the German occupation of Norway during World War II, no elections were held for new municipal councils until after the war ended in 1945.

=== Mayors ===
The mayor (Nynorsk: ordførar) of Evje Municipality was the political leader of the municipality and the chairperson of the municipal council. The following people have held this position:

- 1877–1877: Salve E. Bjoraa
- 1878–1881: Ola N. Løvland
- 1882–1893: Ola G. Lauvland
- 1894–1901: Ola N. Galteland
- 1902–1910: Ola N. Løvland
- 1910–1919: Eirik S. Bjoraa
- 1920–1922: Nils T. Odde
- 1923–1925: Ola N. Galteland
- 1926–1928: John A. Syrtveit
- 1928–1941: Torvald Haavardstad (Ap)
- 1942–1945: Olav Ottar Abusdal (NS)
- 1945–1959: Torvald Haavardstad (Ap)

== Notable people ==
- Torvald Haavardstad (1893–1965), a local politician
- Helena Iren Michaelsen (born 1977), a rock singer

== See also ==
- List of former municipalities of Norway
