= Preben Munthe =

Norwegian economist (1922–2013)

Preben Hempel Munthe (15 October 1922 – 3 January 2013) was a Norwegian economist.

He was born in Aker, the son of librarian Wilhelm Munthe (1883–1965) and his wife Jenny Hempel (1882–1975). Gerhard Munthe was his elder brother. The younger Munthe finished his secondary education in 1941, and graduated from the University of Oslo with the cand.oecon. degree five years later. He was employed as a research fellow at the Norwegian School of Economics and Business Administration in the following year, and was promoted to docent in 1956. He took his doctorate in 1961, and was a professor at the University of Oslo from 1961 to 1992. Parallel to this he served as the State Conciliator of Norway from 1965 to 1974. His published works include Freedom of Entry into Industry and Trade (1959), Produsentenes vertikale markedspolitikk som pristeoretisk problem (1960), Horisontale karteller (1961), Sirkulasjon, inntekt og økonomisk vekst (1976, third ed. 1983), Penger, kreditt og valuta (1978, second ed. 1982) and Markedsøkonomi (1979, third ed. 1982).

Munthe was a consultant for the Norwegian Nobel Committee from 1959 to 1983, and served on the editorial board of Familieboka (fourth edition, 1973–1975) and Store norske leksikon (first edition 1978–1981; second edition 1985–1989; third edition 1995–1999). He was chairman of Norsk Hydro from 1974 to 1977, Freia from 1978 to 1990, Aschehoug Forlag from 1979 to 1992 and Fritt Ord from 1981 to 2000. He was a board member of IBM in Norway, Nora Industrier and Bergen Bank, and edited Bergen Bank's quarterly publication from 1967 to 1982. He was decorated as a Commander of the Royal Norwegian Order of St. Olav in 1971, and was chancellor for the order from 1985 to 2000. In 1974 he became a member of the Norwegian Academy of Science and Letters. Munthe has been honoured with two Festschriften, published in 1982 and 2000.

He was married to architect Siri Serck-Hanssen, and resided in Oslo. Munthe died in January 2013 at the age of 90.

Preceded by Thoralf Evje	State Conciliator of Norway; 1965–1974	Succeeded by Konrad B. Knutsen
Business positions
Preceded by Erik Anker	Chair of Norsk Hydro; 1974–1977	Succeeded by Johan Berthin Holte
