= Per Engebretsen =

Norwegian civil servant

Per Engebretsen (16 October 1946 – 18 August 2014) was a Norwegian civil servant.

He was born in Oslo, and held the cand.oecon. degree in economics. He was a negotiator in Akademikernes Fellesorganisasjon from 1981 to 1988, secretary-general in the Norwegian Association of Pharmacists from 1988 to 1989 and director in the Ministry of Government Administration from 1991 to 1995. From 1995 to 2003 he was the Government Director of Personnel, except for some months in 2002 when he was the acting director of Aetat. In 2003 he became head negotiator for the Confederation of Unions for Professionals. He died in August 2014.

Civic offices
Preceded by Aud Blankholm	Government Director of Personnel of Norway; 1995–2003	Succeeded by Per Kristian Knutsen
Preceded by Lars Wilhelmsen	Director of Aetat (acting); 2002	Succeeded by Inger-Johanne Stokke
