= Ås, Agder =

Village in Birkenes Municipality, Norway

Ås
- Village
- Interactive map of Ås
- Coordinates: 58.5197°N 08.1333°E
- Country: Norway
- Region: Southern Norway
- County: Agder
- Municipality: Birkenes Municipality
- Elevation: 278 m (912 ft)
- Time zone: UTC+01:00 (CET)
  - Summer (DST): UTC+02:00 (CEST)
- Post Code: 4768 Engesland

Ås is a village in Birkenes Municipality in Agder county, Norway. The village is located about 2 kilometres (1.2 mi) southeast of the village of Engesland, along the Norwegian County Road 405.
