= Siri Røine =

Norwegian civil servant (born 1957)

Siri Røine (born 1957) is a Norwegian civil servant.

She was born in Oslo, and took education as a dental hygienist and jurist. She has worked as assisting head negotiator in the trade union, Norwegian Nurses' Union. Later, she worked in the Norwegian Association of Local and Regional Authorities and the Confederation of Norwegian Enterprise. In 2008 she was named as the new Government Director of Personnel. As such she is also a member of the National Wages Board.

She resides in Son.

Preceded by Jørn Skille	Government Director of Personnel of Norway; 2008–12	Succeeded by Merethe Foss Liverud
