= Egil Aarvik =

Norwegian Minister of Social Affairs (1912–1990)

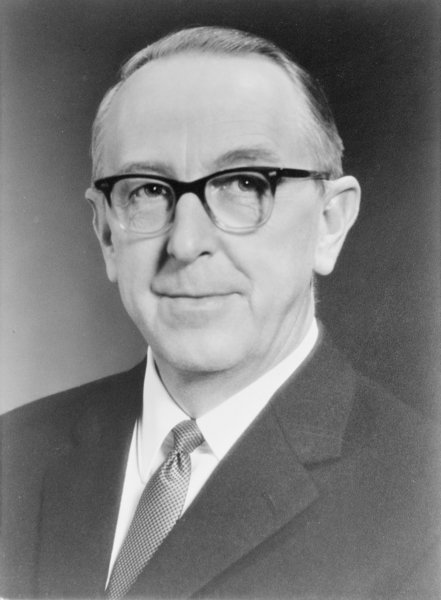

Vice President of the Lagting
- In office 9 October 1973 – 30 September 1977
- President: Torild Skard
- Preceded by: Aase Lionæs
- Succeeded by: Liv Andersen

President of the Lagting
- In office 24 October 1972 – 30 September 1973
- Vice President: Aase Lionæs
- Preceded by: Lars Korvald
- Succeeded by: Torild Skard

Minister of Social Affairs
- In office 12 October 1965 – 17 March 1971
- Prime Minister: Per Borten
- Preceded by: Olav Gjærevoll
- Succeeded by: Odd Højdahl

Personal details
- Born: 12 December 1912 Børsa, Søndre Trondhjem, Norway
- Died: 19 July 1990 (aged 77) Oslo, Norway
- Party: Christian Democratic

Egil Aarvik (12 December 1912 – 19 July 1990) was a Norwegian newspaper editor, author and politician for the Christian Democratic Party. He served as Chairman of the Norwegian Nobel Committee from 1982 to 1990.

== Early life and career ==
He grew up at Børsa in Søndre Trondhjem county, Norway. He was the son of Julius Aarvik (1890–1961) and Louise Lie (1889–1973). After attending a folk high school in 1933, he was hired as a secretary in the Norwegian Lutheran Mission Society (Det norske lutherske Indremisjonsselskap). From 1940 to 1946 he was the mission secretary in Stavanger.

He worked as a journalist in Trondheim for Dagsavisa from 1947 to 1950, before advancing to be editor-in-chief of that local Christian newspaper. In 1955, he left to work full-time as editor-in-chief of Folkets Framtid. He subsequently moved to Grorud, where he sat on the congregational council (1962–1966).

== Political career ==
Aarvik served was a member of the municipal council of Strinda Municipality during the term 1951–1955. He was elected as a deputy representative to the Parliament of Norway from Oslo in 1957, and became a full representative in 1961. He chaired the Standing Committee on Social Affairs during his first term. He was not re-elected in 1965, but gained his seat back again in both 1969 and 1973.

In 1965, having recently lost his Parliament seat, Aarvik was appointed as the Minister of Social Affairs in the centre-right Borten's Cabinet. He held the position until Prime Minister Borten's Cabinet fell in 1971. The most important accomplishment during his time was the 1967 passing of the general benefits act (Norwegian: folketrygden). He was also a capacity on foreign policy. Unlike the majority in his party he supported Norwegian EEC membership in 1972.

Meanwhile, Aarvik was appointed to the Borten cabinet, he did not meet in parliamentary session and then-deputy Kåre Kristiansen filled his seat. After returning to Parliament, Aarvik served as a member of the Standing Committee on Finance and Economic Affairs from 1971 to 1977 and was President of the Lagting from 1972 to 1973.

He lived in Bærum Municipality for some time, being elected from the constituency Akershus in 1973. As a pensioner he moved to Nøtterøy Municipality. From 1977 to 1981, he spent the final years of his professional career working in Norwegian Church Aid. He was also chairman of the board of Blue Cross, Norwegian branch, from 1960 to 1962. He was vice chairman of the Norwegian Nobel Committee from 1975 to 1982, and chairman from 1982 to 1990. He was a deputy board member of Folketrygdfondet from 1972 to 1983 and chaired the corporate council of Statoil from 1973 to 1984.

== Selected works ==
- Er kristendommen fallit? (1941)
- Løftet av stormen (1942)
- Vi gjemmer oss på bedehuset (1954)
- Dumme troll og menn til kjerringer (1956)
- Kvinnen fra Samaria (1973)
- Vraket sølv: Kongen Saul (1975)
- Syn på saker (1982)
- Smil i alvor. Fragmenter av et liv (1985)

Political offices
Preceded by Olav Gjærevoll	Norwegian Minister of Social Affairs; 1965–1971	Succeeded by Odd Højdahl
Cultural offices
Preceded by John Sanness	Chairman of the Norwegian Nobel Committee; 1982-1990	Succeeded by Gidske Anderson
