= Aud Blankholm =

Norwegian nurse and administrator

Aud Blankholm (born 1 November 1947) is a Norwegian nurse and administrator. She was born in Ørsta Municipality. She served as Government Director of Personnel from 1990 to 1995. From 2001, she served as Secretary General of the nurses union Norsk Sykepleierforbund.

Civic offices
Preceded by Nils Mugaas	Government Director of Personnel of Norway; 1990–1995	Succeeded by Per Engebretsen
