= Bjarne Døhlen =

Norwegian jurist and civil servant (1904–1989)

Bjarne Døhlen (1904 – 1989) was a Norwegian jurist and civil servant.

He graduated with the cand.jur. degree in 1927, and worked as a deputy judge in Sør-Gudbrandsdal from 1928 to 1930. In 1930 he worked briefly as a junior solicitor before being hired in the Ministry of Finance. He advanced to assistant secretary before leaving in 1946. From 1948 to 1974 he was the director of Statens Personaldirektorat. Statens Personaldirektorat was abolished after 1990, but was succeeded by a department in the Ministry of Government Administration and Labour (now: the Ministry of Government Administration and Reform).

Civic offices
Preceded by Henrik Lundh	Director of Statens Personaldirektorat; 1948–1974	Succeeded by Nils Mugaas
