= Steinar Strøm =

Norwegian economist (born 1942)

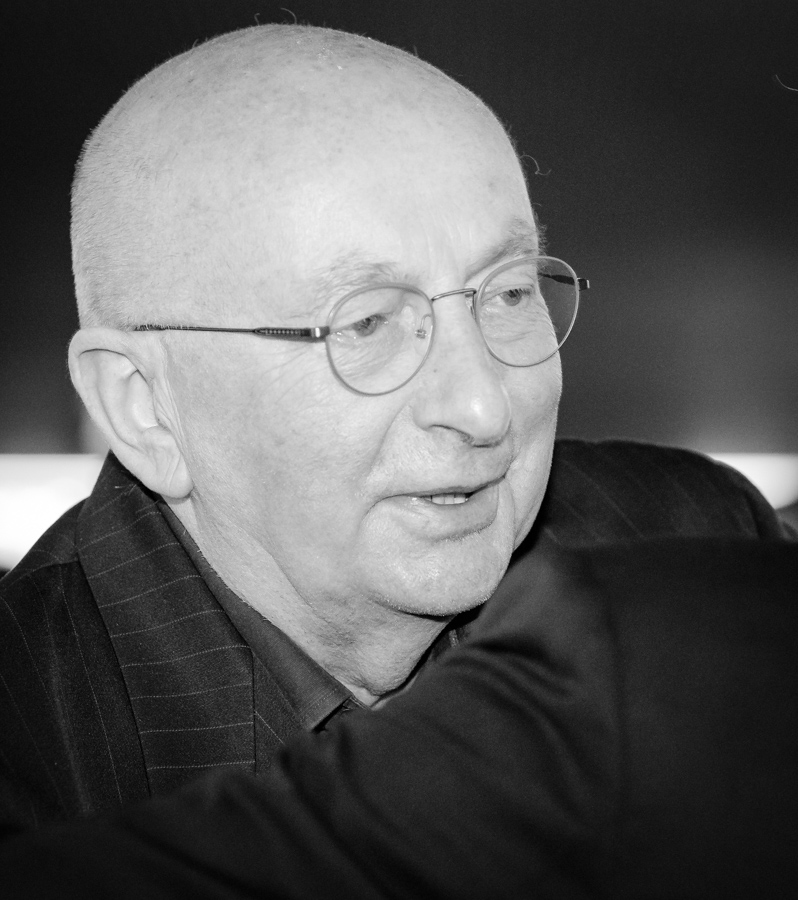
Steinar Strøm at Governor Øystein Olsen's annual address in February 2018

Steinar Strøm (born 10 April 1942) is a Norwegian economist. He is currently a professor of economics at the University of Turin, researcher at the Frisch Center and a partner and chairman of the board of directors of Vista Analysis. Strøm was Professor of Economics at the University of Oslo from 1976 to 2008. He is noted for his research on microeconometrics and labour economics, as well as energy economics and environmental economics. He is a member of the National Wages Board, appointed by the Norwegian government in 2013. He is also a member of the Norwegian Academy of Science and Letters. He is also affiliated with the Ragnar Frisch Centre for Economic Research. He has chaired two governmental commissions, the Income Formation Commission (1988) and The Market for Pharmaceuticals Commission (1997), and was editor of The Scandinavian Journal of Economics 1977–1981. He has been a scientific adviser to the Royal Ministry of Finance and Statistics Norway.

He has been a visiting professor at the Academy of Social Sciences in Beijing and Shanghai, the University of Wisconsin, Madison, the University of California, Berkeley, the University of Heidelberg, the University of Venice, Tilburg University, and the Center for Economic Studies.

== Selected publications ==
- Effektivitet, fordeling og økonomisk politikk, with Jon Vislie, Universitetsforlaget (2007) ISBN 9788215010816
- Økonomisk atferd, beslutninger og likevekt, with Jon Vislie, Universitetsforlaget (2008) ISBN 9788215013572
