= Henrik Lundh =

Norwegian civil servant (1894–1985)

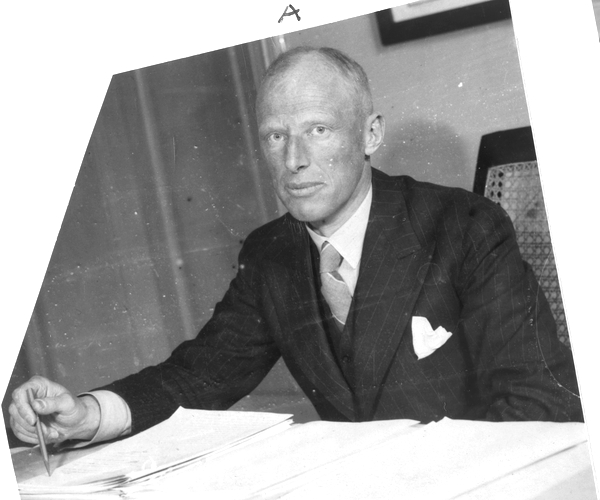
Henrik Lundh, c. 1951

Henrik Julius Lundh (16 April 1894 – February 1985) was a Norwegian civil servant.

He was born in Kristiania as a son of Ragnar Lundh (1863–1924) and Aggie Olsen (1875–1946). From 1919 he was married to Ragnhild Tandberg, but she died in 1922. From 1924 he was married to Elise Caroline Aubert (1898–1972).

He finished his secondary education in 1911, and enrolled in law studies. He was a journalist while studying. He graduated from the University of Oslo with the cand.jur. degree in 1916, and worked as a deputy judge, junior solicitor and from 1919 secretary in the Ministry of Justice and the Police. He took the dr.juris degree in 1929 and was promoted to assistant secretary in the Ministry of Justice and the Police in 1930. He issued the books Navneloven in 1924 and Navneplikt og navnerett in 1928, both concerning the formal naming conventions. He also contributed to newspapers and periodicals.

He was hired as director of wages in the Ministry of Finance in 1936, but returned in 1942 during World War II to the Ministry of Justice-in-exile (in London) as deputy under-secretary of state. In 1945 he was hired as director of Statens Personaldirektorat. From 1948 to 1954 he was the State Conciliator of Norway, and from 1954 to 1964 he was stipendiary magistrate of Oslo.

He represented Norway as a secretary in Det Nordiske Administrative Forbund (Nordic Administrative Association) from 1925 to 1936, and edited Nordisk Administrativt Tidsskrift from 1929 to 1941. He participated in judicial congresses in The Hague, Paris and Madrid, and lectured at the University of Oslo. He died in 1985, aged 90.

Civic offices
Preceded by did not exist	Director of Statens Personaldirektorat; 1945–1948	Succeeded by Bjarne Døhlen
Preceded by Paal Berg	State Conciliator of Norway; 1948–1954	Succeeded by Thoralf Evje
