= Odd Højdahl =

Norwegian politician

Odd Højdahl (5 January 1921 – 23 February 1994) was a Norwegian trade unionist and politician for the Labour Party.

He was born in Oslo.

In 1971–1972 he was the Minister of Social Affairs in the first cabinet Bratteli. As an elected politician he served as a deputy representative to the Norwegian Parliament from Oslo during the term 1961–1965. On the local level he was a member of Oslo city council from 1953 to 1957.

Having studied law from 1941 to 1943, after World War II he worked one year as a police officer and then as a civil servant. He then became a professional trade unionist, holding positions in trade unions within the national trade union center Norwegian Confederation of Trade Unions from 1951. He later rose in the hierarchy of the Confederation to serve as secretary from 1960 to 1969 and then vice chairman from 1969 to 1977. From 1977 to 1988 he directed the Norwegian Labour Inspection Authority.

He chaired the Norwegian People's Aid from 1975 to 1979. He was a board member of Strukturfinans, Tiden Norsk Forlag, Arbeiderbladet and Den norske Creditbank.

Preceded by Egil Aarvik	Norwegian Minister of Social Affairs; 1971–1972	Succeeded by Bergfrid Fjose
Preceded by Bjarne Dahlberg	Director of the Norwegian Labour Inspection Authority; 1977–1988	Succeeded by Dagfinn Habberstad
Preceded by Arne Bruusgaard	Chairman of the Norwegian People's Aid; 1975–1979	Succeeded by Svein-Erik Oxholm
