= Vista Analysis =

Norwegian research and consultancy firm

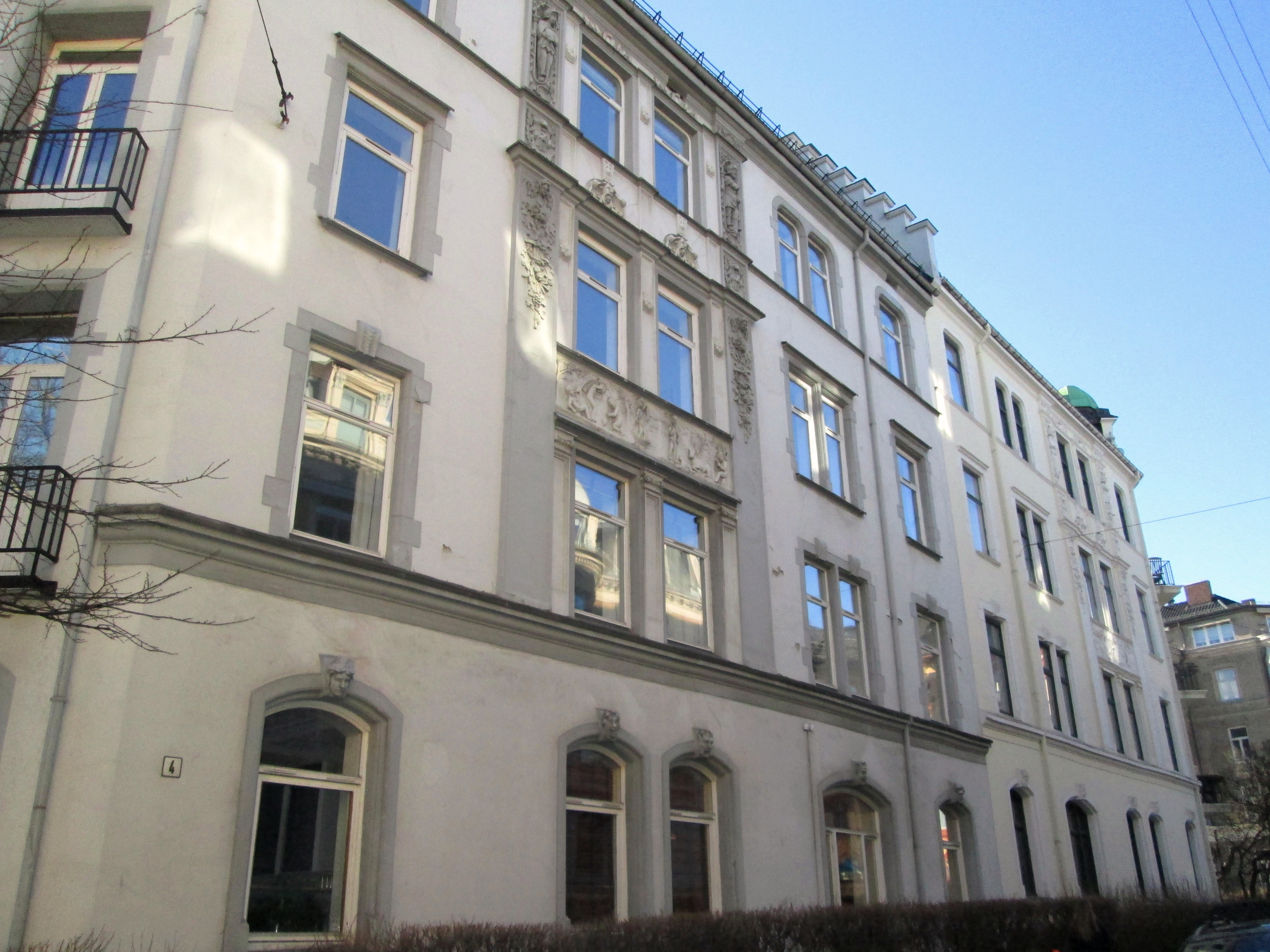
The headquarters of Vista Analysis in Meltzers gate 4 at Frogner, Oslo

Vista Analysis (Norwegian: Vista Analyse AS) is a Norwegian research and consultancy firm with the main emphasis on economic research, policy analysis and advice, and evaluations. It was established in 2000 and is headquartered at Frogner in Oslo, and focuses on climate, environment and energy, urban and rural development, international development, transport and communications, and welfare state research. The company is owned by several partners. The chairman of the board is the economist Steinar Strøm, a professor of economics at the University of Turin and the University of Oslo.

The company is one of the largest firms providing independent policy analysis, evaluations and research for the Government of Norway. Its regular customers include the Ministry of Finance, the Ministry of Foreign Affairs, the Ministry of Petroleum and Energy, the Ministry of Trade and Industry, the Ministry of Transport and Communications, the Ministry of Justice and Public Security, the Ministry of the Environment, and the Norwegian Agency for Development Cooperation.

The institute carried out the much noted evaluation in 2014 of the Norwegian ban on purchasing the services of prostitutes.

== Noted people ==
- Steinar Strøm
- Michael Hoel
- Sidsel Sverdrup
- Haakon Vennemo
