= Folkets Framtid =

Norwegian newspaper

Folkets Framtid ('The People's Future') was a Norwegian newspaper. It was the official party organ of the Christian Democratic Party.

It was established in 1947 in Mysen. From 1954 to 1957 it was published in Trondheim, as Dagsavisa, the local Christian newspaper in that city, had become defunct. From 1958 Folkets Framtid was headquartered in Oslo. Among its editors-in-chief was Egil Aarvik.

In its later years, it was distributed largely among members of the Christian Democratic Party. Its circulation was 12,335 in 1983, and about 5,240 in 2003. Following hardships with party finances, the Christian Democratic Party decided to close the newspaper in late 2005.
