= Norwegian Labour Inspection Authority =

Norwegian government agency

- Arbeidstilsynet

Government agency overview
- Jurisdiction: Government of Norway
- Headquarters: Trondheim, Norway
- Employees: c. 600
- Government agency executive: Trude Vollheim, Director
- Parent Government agency: Norwegian Ministry of Labour
- Website: www.arbeidstilsynet.no

The Norwegian Labour Inspection Authority (Norwegian: Arbeidstilsynet) is a Norwegian government agency under the Ministry of Labour. It is responsible for supervising the implementation of the Working Environment Act, the Annual Holidays Act, the National Holidays Act, and certain sections of the Smoking Act.

The organization consists of a Directorate (Direktoratet for Arbeidstilsynet) based in Trondheim, seven regional offices and sixteen local offices spread around the country.

The heads of the Directorate, and thereby of the whole organization, have been Olav Hindahl (1946–1963), Bjarne Dahlberg (1963–1977), Odd Højdahl (1977–1988), Dagfinn Habberstad (1988–1994), Ivar Leveraas (1994–2006), Ingrid Finboe Svendsen (2006–2016) and Trude Vollheim (2017–present).
