= Bjarne Orten =

Norwegian civil servant (1919–2011)

Bjarne Orten (22 December 1919 – 14 January 2011) was a Norwegian civil servant.

A jurist by education, he worked as an attorney before entering a career in the Norwegian State Housing Bank. This career spanned thirty-nine years, including the period 1972 to 1987 when he was CEO.

He was also deputy chairman as well as member of the board of the Norges Juristforbund, and president of the Norwegian Gymnastics Association. He was also active in Lions Club.

Preceded by	CEO of the Norwegian State Housing Bank; 1972–1987	Succeeded by Ivar Leveraas
