= Government Director of Personnel (Norway) =

The Government Director of Personnel (Norwegian: Statens personaldirektør) is a Norwegian position in the civil service.

The director leads the Department of Employer Policy within the Norwegian Ministry of Government Administration, Reform and Church Affairs. According to the Public Service Disputes Act, the sitting director is also a member of the National Wages Board.

The Department of Employer Policy was formerly organized as a directorate, the State Directorate of Personnel (Norwegian: Statens personaldirektorat).

== List of Government Directors of Personnel ==
- As directors of the State Directorate of Personnel:
  - 1945–1948 : Henrik Lundh
  - 1948–1974 : Bjarne Døhlen
  - 1974–1990 : Nils Mugaas
- As leaders of the Department of Employer Policy:
  - 1990–1995 : Aud Blankholm
  - 1995–2003 : Per Engebretsen
    - 2002 : Finn Melbø, while Engebretsen was acting director of Aetat
  - 2003–2004 : Per Kristian Knutsen (acting)
  - 2004–2008 : Jørn Skille
  - 2008–2012 : Siri Røine
  - 2012–2015 : Merethe Foss Liverud
  - 2015– : Gisle Norheim
