= Vegusdal Municipality =

Former municipality in Aust-Agder, Norway

Vegusdal Municipality Vegusdal herad
- Former municipality
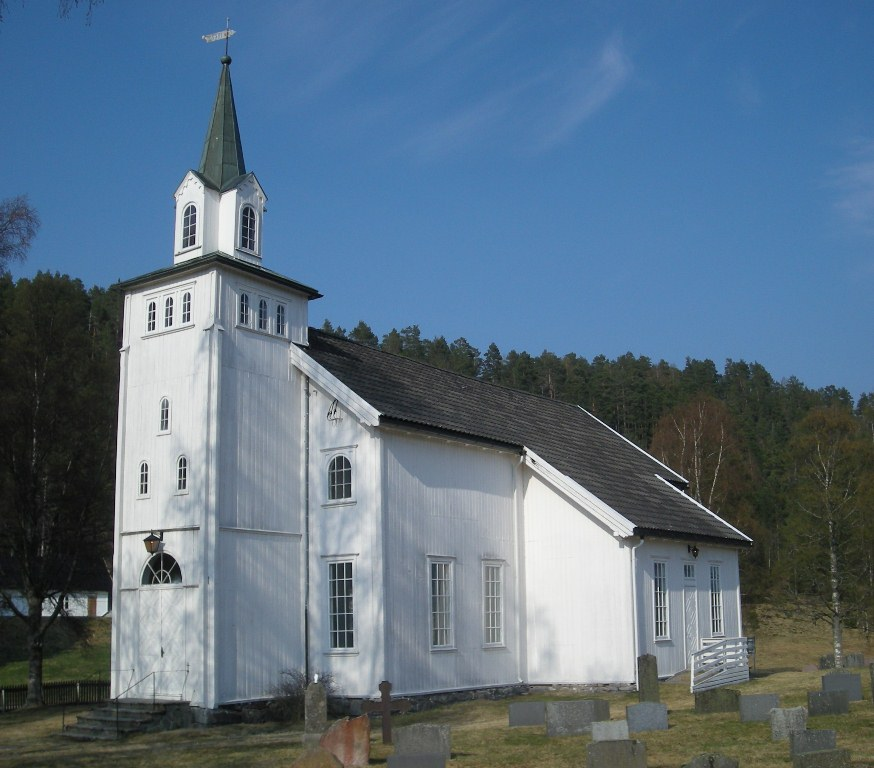
- View of the local Vegusdal Church

- Aust-Agder within Norway

- Vegusdal within Aust-Agder
- Coordinates: 58°34′45″N 08°08′44″E
- Country: Norway
- County: Aust-Agder
- Established: 1 Jan 1877
  - Preceded by: Evje og Vegusdal Municipality
- Disestablished: 1 Jan 1967
  - Succeeded by: Birkenes Municipality
- Administrative centre: Engesland

Government
  - Mayor (1960–1966): Peder Aas

Area
  - Total: 325.1 km^{2} (125.5 sq mi)
  - Rank: #261 in Norway
- Highest elevation: 645 m (2,116 ft)

Population (1966)
  - Total: 593
  - Rank: #455 in Norway
  - Density: 1.8/km^{2} (4.7/sq mi)
  - Change (10 years): ▼ −21.9%
- Demonym(s): Veggdøl; Veggedøl

Official language
  - Norwegian form: Nynorsk
- Time zone: UTC+01:00 (CET)
  - Summer (DST): UTC+02:00 (CEST)
- ISO 3166 code: NO-0934

Vegusdal is a former municipality in the old Aust-Agder county, Norway. The 325.1-square-kilometre (125.5 sq mi) municipality existed from 1877 until its dissolution in 1967. The area is now part of Birkenes Municipality in Agder county. The administrative centre was the village of Engesland where Vegusdal Church is located.

Prior to its dissolution in 1967, the 325.1-square-kilometre (125.5 sq mi) municipality was the 261st largest by area out of the 460 municipalities in Norway. Vegusdal Municipality was the 455th most populous municipality in Norway with a population of about 593. The municipality's population density was 1.8 inhabitants per square kilometre (4.7/sq mi) and its population had decreased by 21.9% over the previous 10-year period.

== General information ==
The municipality of Vegusdal was established on 1 January 1877 when the old Evje og Vegusdal Municipality was divided into two: the southeastern district (population: 935) became the new Vegusdal Municipality and the northwestern district (population: 870) became the new Evje Municipality. In 1900, the municipality had 985 inhabitants distributed among 141 farms.

During the 1960s, there were many municipal mergers across Norway due to the work of the Schei Committee. On 1 January 1967, Herefoss Municipality was dissolved and the following areas were merged to form an enlarged Birkenes Municipality:

- all of Vegusdal Municipality (population: 582)
- all of Birkenes Municipality (population: 1,883)
- all of Herefoss Municipality (population: 585)

=== Name ===
The municipality (originally the parish) is named after the old Vegusdal farm (Old Norse: Veikolfsdalr) since the first Vegusdal Church was built there. The first element is derived from the old male name, Veikolfr. The male name itself was a compound name with the first component Veik- coming from veikr which means "weak" and the second component -olfr was a variant form of the more common male name Úlfr (also spelled Ulfr, from Old Norse úlfr, ulfr "wolf"; cf. Icelandic Úlfur and Faroese Úlvur). The last element of the name is dalr which means "valley" or "dale". Thus this is the "valley of Weak-Ulfr (or Weak-Wolf)".

=== Churches ===
The Church of Norway had one parish (sokn) within Vegusdal Municipality. At the time of the municipal dissolution, it was part of the Herefoss prestegjeld and the Vest-Nedenes prosti (deanery) in the Diocese of Agder.

Churches in Vegusdal Municipality
Parish (sokn)	Church name	Location of the church	Year built
Vegusdal	Vegusdal Church	Engesland	1867

== Geography ==
The highest point in the municipality was the 645-metre (2,116 ft) tall mountain Himmelsyna, located on the northern border of the municipality. Mykland Municipality was located to the north and east, Herefoss Municipality was located to the southeast, Birkenes Municipality was located to the south, Iveland Municipality was located to the southwest, and Evje Municipality was located to the northwest.

== Government ==
While it existed, Vegusdal Municipality was responsible for primary education (through 10th grade), outpatient health services, senior citizen services, welfare and other social services, zoning, economic development, and municipal roads and utilities. The municipality was governed by a municipal council of directly elected representatives. The mayor was indirectly elected by a vote of the municipal council. The municipality was under the jurisdiction of the Nedenes District Court and the Agder Court of Appeal.

=== Municipal council ===
The municipal council (Heradstyre) of Vegusdal Municipality was made up of 13 representatives that were elected to four year terms. The tables below show the historical composition of the council by political party.

Vegusdal heradsstyre 1963–1967
Party name (in Nynorsk)	Number of representatives
Labour Party (Arbeidarpartiet)	4
Centre Party (Senterpartiet)	7
Liberal Party (Venstre)	2
Total number of members:	13
Note: On 1 January 1964, Vegusdal Municipality became part of Birkenes Municipality.

Vegusdal herredsstyre 1959–1963 v
Party name (in Norwegian)	Number of representatives
Labour Party (Arbeiderpartiet)	4
Centre Party (Senterpartiet)	6
Liberal Party (Venstre)	3
Total number of members:	13

Vegusdal heradsstyre 1955–1959
Party name (in Nynorsk)	Number of representatives
Labour Party (Arbeidarpartiet)	4
Farmers' Party (Bondepartiet)	7
Liberal Party (Venstre)	2
Total number of members:	13

Vegusdal heradsstyre 1951–1955
Party name (in Nynorsk)	Number of representatives
Labour Party (Arbeidarpartiet)	4
Farmers' Party (Bondepartiet)	5
Liberal Party (Venstre)	3
Total number of members:	12

Vegusdal heradsstyre 1947–1951
Party name (in Nynorsk)	Number of representatives
Labour Party (Arbeidarpartiet)	4
Farmers' Party (Bondepartiet)	6
Joint list of the Liberal Party (Venstre) and the Radical People's Party (Radikale Folkepartiet)	2
Total number of members:	12

Vegusdal heradsstyre 1945–1947
Party name (in Nynorsk)	Number of representatives
Labour Party (Arbeidarpartiet)	5
Farmers' Party (Bondepartiet)	5
Joint list of the Liberal Party (Venstre) and the Radical People's Party (Radikale Folkepartiet)	2
Total number of members:	12

Vegusdal heradsstyre 1937–1941*
Party name (in Nynorsk)	Number of representatives
Labour Party (Arbeidarpartiet)	3
Farmers' Party (Bondepartiet)	6
Liberal Party (Venstre)	3
Total number of members:	12
Note: Due to the German occupation of Norway during World War II, no elections were held for new municipal councils until after the war ended in 1945.

=== Mayors ===
The mayor (Nynorsk: ordførar) of Vegusdal Municipality was the political leader of the municipality and the chairperson of the municipal council. The following people have held this position:

- 1877–1877: Ole Gundersen Skrædderaas
- 1878–1881: Eilef Taraldsen Fjermedal
- 1882–1885: Gunder Osmundsen Dovland
- 1886–1916: Jens Klepsland
- 1917–1922: Theodor Holm
- 1923–1934: Gunnuf Engesland
- 1935–1942: Gunnar Kateraas
- 1942–1944: Erling Vegusdal (NS)
- 1945–1951: Gunnar Kateraas
- 1952–1955: Bernhard Kateraas
- 1956–1959: Gunnar Kateraas
- 1960–1966: Peder Aas

== See also ==
- List of former municipalities of Norway
