= Engesland =

Village in Birkenes Municipality, Norway

- Village
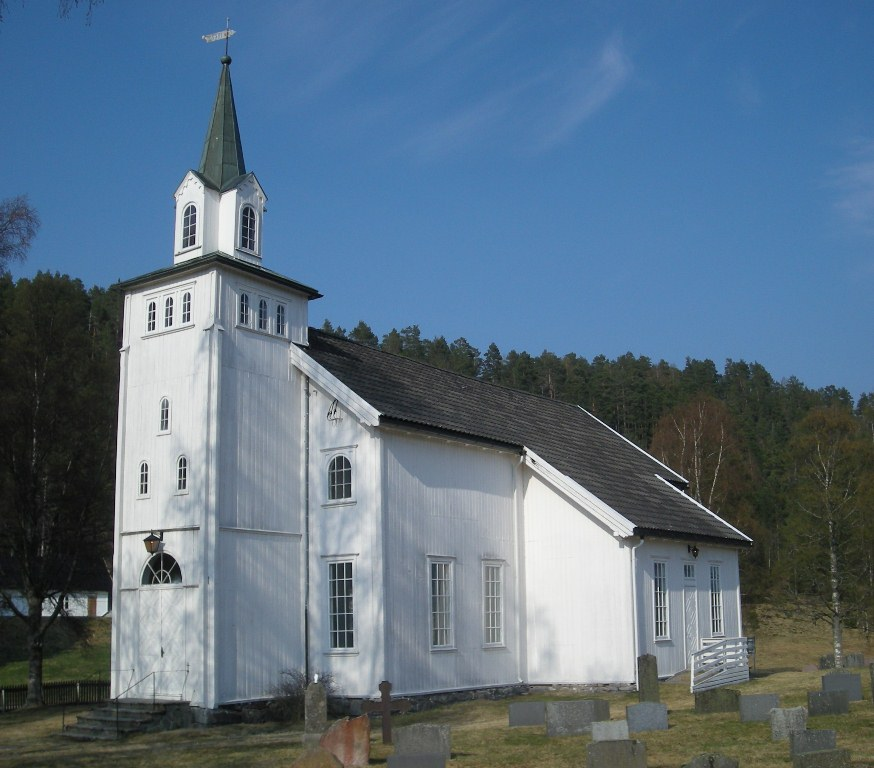
- View of Vegusdal Church in Engesland
- Interactive map of Engesland
- Coordinates: 58.5317°N 08.1178°E
- Country: Norway
- Region: Southern Norway
- County: Agder
- Municipality: Birkenes Municipality
- Elevation: 247 m (810 ft)
- Time zone: UTC+01:00 (CET)
  - Summer (DST): UTC+02:00 (CEST)
- Post Code: 4768 Engesland

Engesland is a village in Birkenes Municipality in Agder county, Norway. The village is located along the Norwegian County Road 405, just west of the lake Ljosevatnet and just a short distance north of the village of Ås.

== History ==
The Vegusdal Church has been located in Engesland since 1867. The village was the administrative centre of the old Vegusdal Municipality which existed from 1877 until the dissolution of the municipality in 1967.
