= Thoralf Evje =

Norwegian judge, civil servant and politician

- Born: 8 December 1902; Vestre Aker, Norway
- Died: 4 September 1976 (aged 73)
- Occupations: judge and civil servant

Thoralf Johannes Irgens Evje (8 December 1902 – 4 September 1976) was a Norwegian judge, civil servant and politician for the Labour Party.

He was born in Vestre Aker to priest Hans Odén Evje and Anna Sofie Elle, finished his secondary education in 1922 and graduated as cand.jur. in 1926.

He served as State Conciliator of Norway from 1954 to 1964. From 1965 to 1970 he was appointed stipendiary magistrate of Oslo. His published works include (jointly with Paal Berg) Kommentar til Arbeidstvistloven and Tjenestetvistloven.

During the German occupation of Norway, Evje was incarcerated by the occupants, at Bredtvedt, Møllergata 19 and Grini, and sent to the Sachsenhausen concentration camp in July 1943.

After six years in Notodden Municipality, Evje settled in Bærum Municipality in 1935 and represented the Labour Party in Bærum School Board from 1939 to 1954 and the municipal council of Bærum Municipality from 1946 to 1952. From 1946 to 1947 he also served as deputy mayor under Leif Larsen. Evje died in September 1976.

Civic offices
Preceded by Henrik Lundh	State Conciliator of Norway; 1954–1964	Succeeded by Preben Munthe
