= Osmund Kaldheim =

Norwegian businessman, civil servant and politician

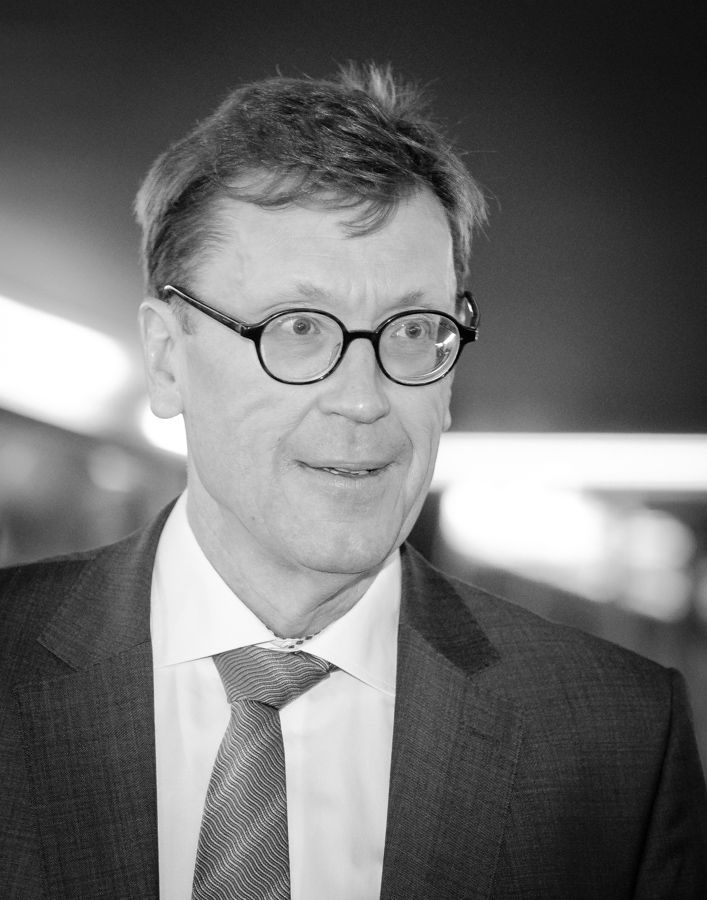
Osmund Kaldheim, 2018

Osmund Kaldheim (born 20 January 1964) is a Norwegian businessman, civil servant and politician for the Conservative Party.

He was born in Haugesund, but grew up in Etne Municipality. He worked as an adviser for the Conservative Party parliamentary group from 1987, and was a private secretary (now called political adviser) in the Ministry of Social Affairs from 1989 to 1990. He was also the mayor of Fet Municipality from 1995 to 1999.

He was an advisor and partner in Geelmuyden.Kiese from 1990 to 1995 and a manager from 1999 to 2001. He was a State Secretary in the Ministry of Social Affairs from 2001 to 2002 and the Ministry of Labour and Administration from 2002 to 2004, both in Bondevik's Second Cabinet. From 2004 to 2005 he was a director in Telenor Broadcast. In 2005 he was hired as director of the new Directorate of Integration and Diversity. He left in March 2010 to become chief administrative officer in Drammen Municipality.

He was a board chairman of Nedre Romerike Vannverk from 1996 to 1999 and a board member of Canal Digital from 2001 and of Wright Trafikkskole from 2004.

Civic offices
Preceded by position created	Director of the Directorate of Integration and Diversity; 2005–2010	Succeeded by Lars Wilhelmsen (acting)
