= National Wages Board =

The National Wages Board (Norwegian: Rikslønnsnemnda) is a Norwegian body for resolving labour disputes.

Its task is to perform a compulsory arbitration (Norwegian: tvungen lønnsnemnd) when negotiations of parties in Norwegian working life (employers and employees) stall, and if the conflict (strike or lockout) has "consequences for life or health, or has other seriously damaging effects on society". The Parliament of Norway, or the Government of Norway when the Parliament is not in session, are responsible for convening the National Wages Board.

It was established on 19 December 1952 when the National Wages Board Act came into effect. It is based in Oslo, and has seven members. The secretariat is provided by the Norwegian Ministry of Labour.

The current members of the National Wages Board are:

- Stein Husby
- Anne Britt Evensen Norum
- Steinar Strøm
- Tor-Arne Solbakken, representing the Norwegian Confederation of Trade Unions
- Rolf Negård, representing the Confederation of Norwegian Enterprise
- Tone Rønholdtangen, representing LO Stat
- Siri Røine, the Government Director of Personnel

== See also ==
- Neo-corporatism
