= Libe Rieber-Mohn =

Norwegian civil servant and politician

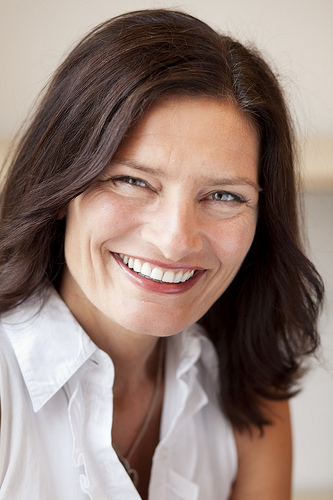
- Libe Rieber-Mohn (2012)

Director-General of the Directorate of Integration and Diversity
- Incumbent
- Assumed office 17 June 2016
- Preceded by: Geir Barvik

Personal details
- Born: 25 August 1965 (age 60)

Libe Solberg Rieber-Mohn (born 25 August 1965) is a Norwegian civil servant and former politician for the Labour Party. She was appointed as Director-General of the Directorate of Integration and Diversity by the King-in-Council on 17 June 2016, succeeding Geir Barvik. She formerly served as a State Secretary in the Ministry of Labour and Social Inclusion and as Deputy Mayor of Oslo.

== Career ==
She graduated as cand.sociol. from the University of Oslo in 1994, and worked as a research assistant at the Norwegian Institute for Social Research from 1994 to 1995.

In 2005, when Jens Stoltenberg's second cabinet took office, she was appointed State Secretary in the Ministry of Labour and Social Inclusion. She held this position until 2009.

On the local level she was a member of Oslo city council from 1987 to 1991, and chaired the local chapter of the Workers' Youth League. She has also been involved in local politics in Gamle Oslo. Rieber-Mohn was the Labor party's candidate for governing mayor of Oslo in the 2011 local elections in Norway. She served as Deputy Mayor of Oslo from 2011 to 2015.

She was appointed as Director-General of the Directorate of Integration and Diversity by the King-in-Council on 17 June 2016, succeeding Geir Barvik, and takes office in August 2016.

== Private life ==
She is married to Rune Bjerke.
