= Lithium beryllide =

Chemical compound

Lithium beryllide is a hypothetical intermetallic compound of lithium and beryllium that may have several possible compositions, including LiBe, LiBe_{2}, Li_{2}Be, LiBe_{3}, Li_{3}Be, Li_{2}Be_{3}, Li_{3}Be_{2}, LiBe_{4} and Li_{4}Be. Computational methods indicate that some of these compositions may be superconductive under very high pressure and low temperature.
