= Directorate of Integration and Diversity =

- Integrerings- og mangfoldsdirektoratet

Government agency overview
- Formed: 2006; 20 years ago
- Jurisdiction: Government of Norway
- Headquarters: Oslo
- Employees: 237
- Government agency executive: Libe Rieber-Mohn, Director-General
- Parent Government agency: Ministry of Justice and Public Security
- Website: www.imdi.no

The Directorate of Integration and Diversity (Norwegian: Integrerings- og mangfoldsdirektoratet) is a Norwegian government agency which is responsible for implementing public policy concerning refugees and integration. It is subordinate to the Ministry of Justice and Public Security and was established in 2006. The directorate is headquartered in Oslo, and has offices in Bergen, Gjøvik, Kristiansand, Narvik, and Trondheim.

== Directors-General ==
- Osmund Kaldheim (2005–2010)
- Geir Barvik (2010–2016)
- Libe Rieber-Mohn (2016–present)
