= Vegusdal Church =

Church in Agder, Norway

- Vegusdal kirke
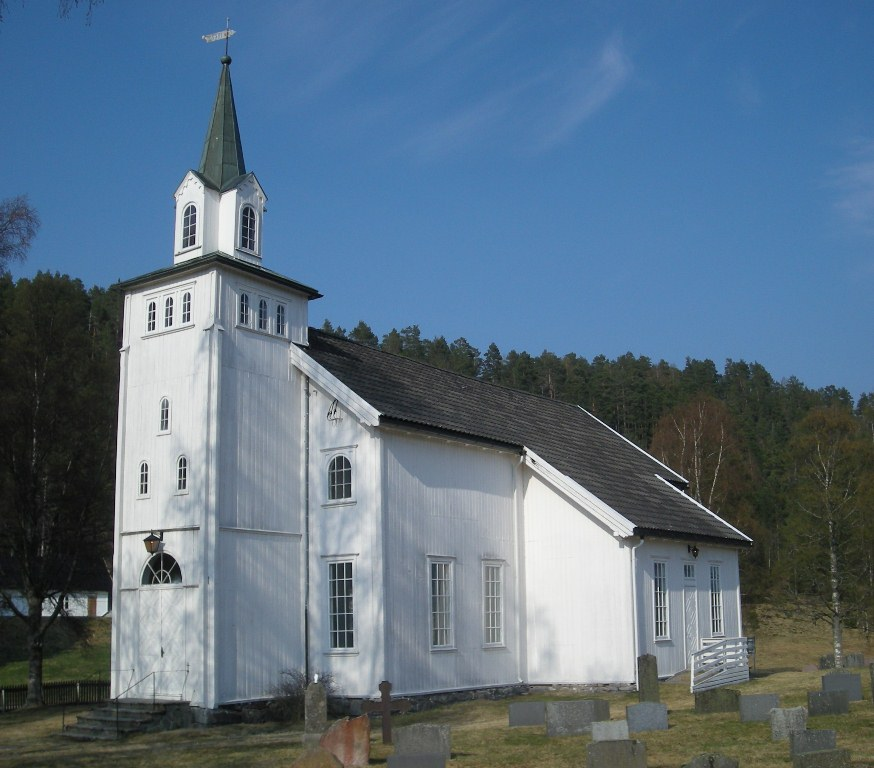
- View of the church
- Vegusdal Church
- 58.534133°N 08.12273°E
- Location: Birkenes Municipality, Agder
- Country: Norway
- Denomination: Church of Norway
- Previous denomination: Catholic Church
- Churchmanship: Evangelical Lutheran

History
- Status: Parish church
- Founded: 13th century
- Consecrated: 23 June 1867

Architecture
- Functional status: Active
- Architect: C.F. von der Lippe
- Architectural type: Cruciform
- Completed: 1867 (159 years ago)

Specifications
- Capacity: 350
- Materials: Wood

Administration
- Diocese: Agder og Telemark
- Deanery: Vest-Nedenes prosti
- Parish: Vegusdal
- Norwegian Cultural Heritage Site
- Type: Church
- Status: Not protected
- ID: 85790

Vegusdal Church (Norwegian: Vegusdal kirke) is a parish church of the Church of Norway in Birkenes Municipality in Agder county, Norway. It is located in the village of Engesland, just off of the Norwegian County Road 405. It is the church for the Vegusdal parish which is part of the Vest-Nedenes prosti (deanery) in the Diocese of Agder og Telemark. The white, wooden church was built in a cruciform design in 1867 using plans drawn up by the architect Conrad Fredrik von der Lippe. The church seats about 350 people.

== History ==
The earliest existing historical records of the church date back to the year 1348, but the church was likely founded in the mid-13th century. The first church in Vegusdal was a stave church that was located on the old Vegusdal farm, about 5 kilometres (3.1 mi) to the northeast of the present-day village of Engesland where the present church stands. One of the old decorative portals from the old stave church still exists and is kept in the Museum of Cultural History at the University of Oslo. The portal pieces are carved wood and they depict scenes from the saga of Sigurd Fåvnesbane. Some time after the Reformation (probably in 1552), the old stave church was demolished and a wooden long church was built on the same site. This church had a nave, choir, and entry room, but no tower or sacristy. The old portal from the previous stave church was used in this church as well.

In 1866-1867, a new church was built in the village Engesland because it was a more central location within Vegusdal and after the new church was completed, the old church was torn down in 1868. The new church was consecrated on 23 June 1867 by the Bishop Jacob von der Lippe, the father of the architect who built the church. In 1974, the small Vegusdal Chapel was built at the old church site next to the old cemetery.

== Media gallery ==
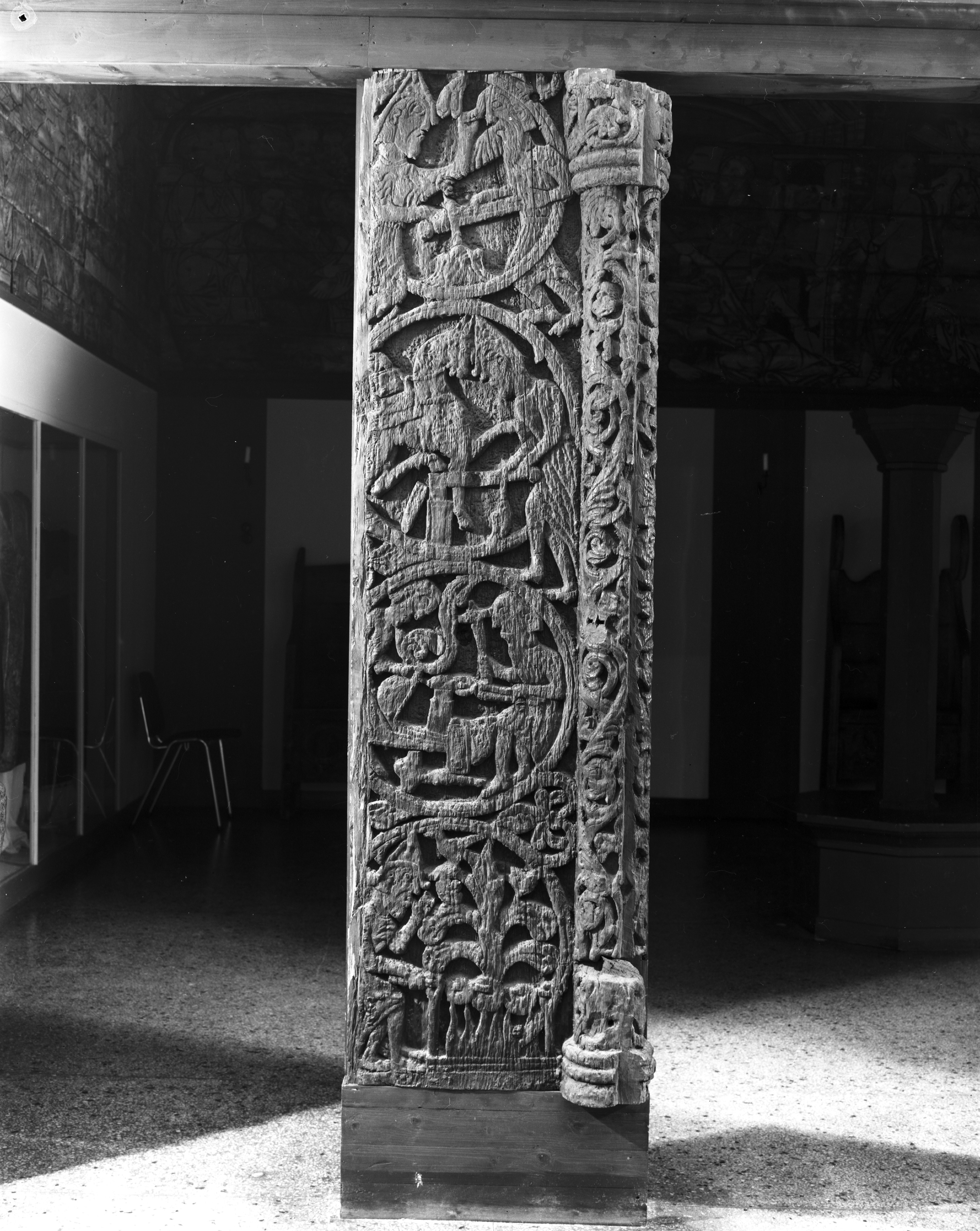
View of the portal from the Vegusdal stave church

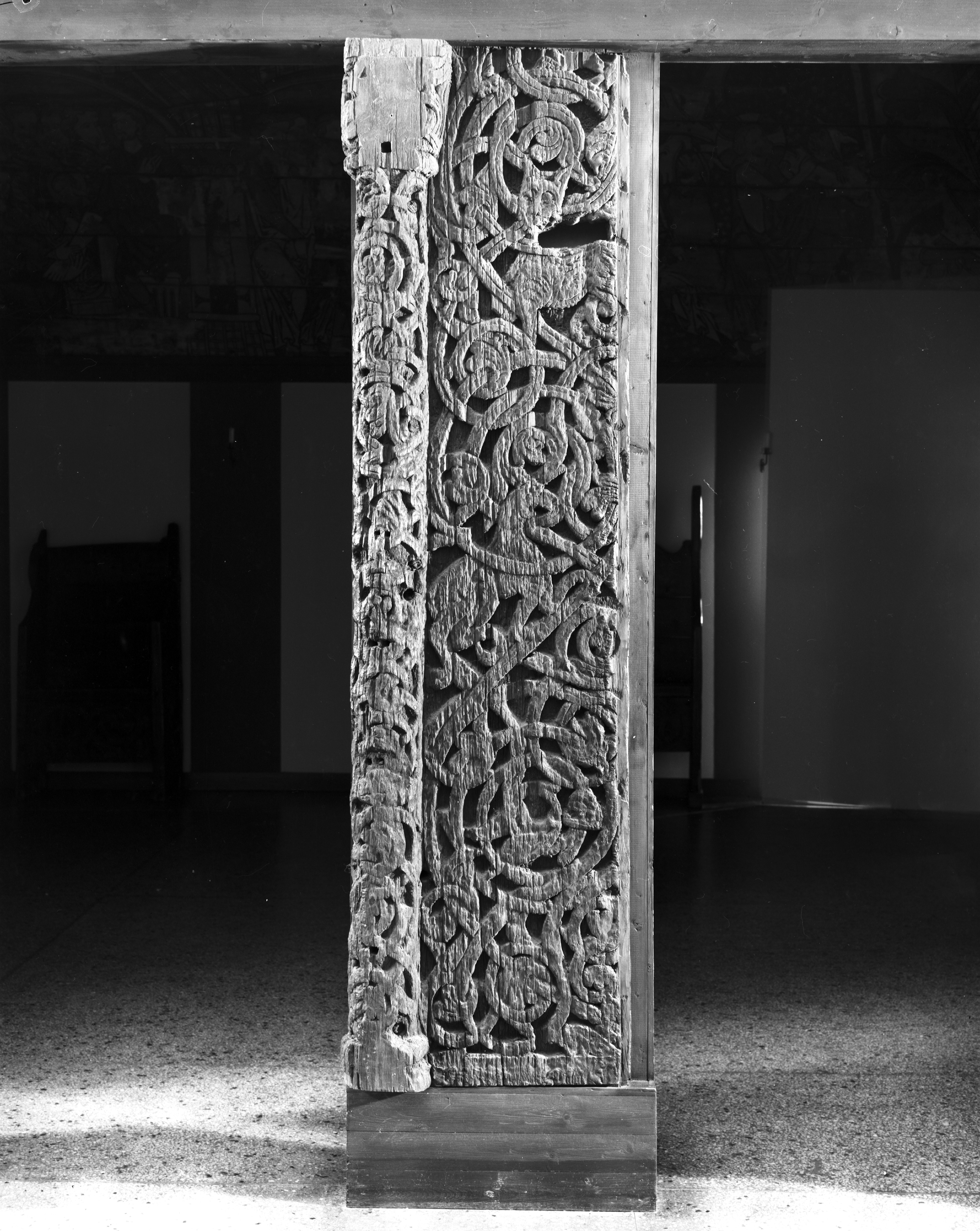
View of the portal from the Vegusdal stave church

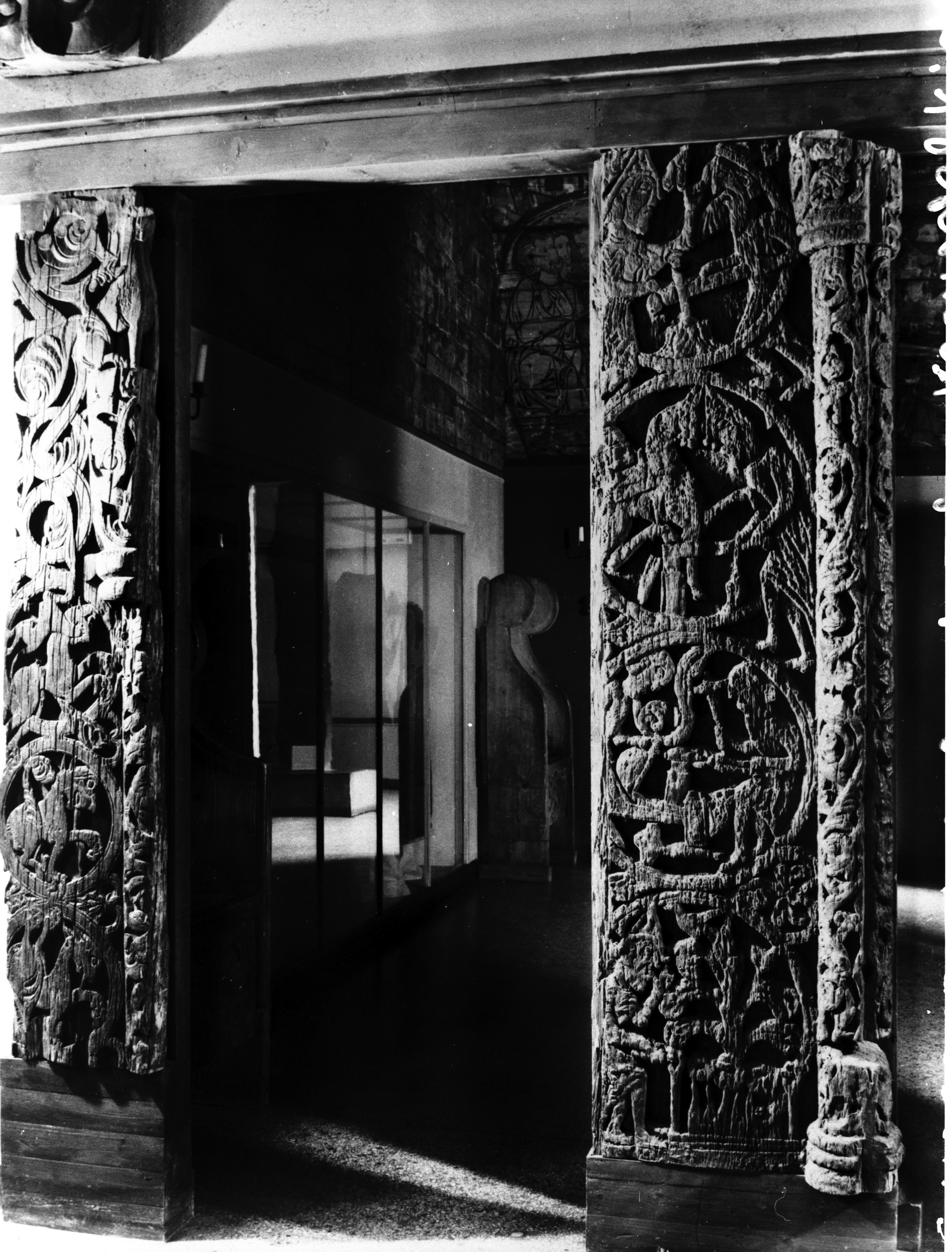
View of the portal from the Vegusdal stave church

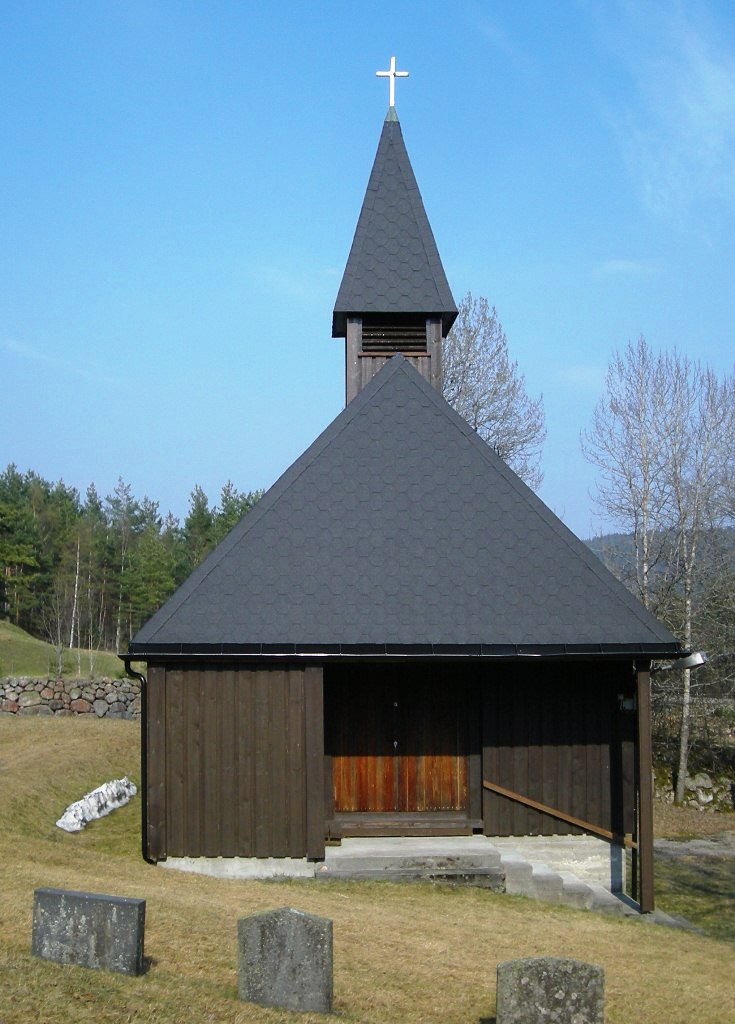
Small chapel built in 1974 on the site of the old church

== See also ==
- List of churches in Agder og Telemark
