= Evje Church =

Church in Agder, Norway

- Evje kyrkje
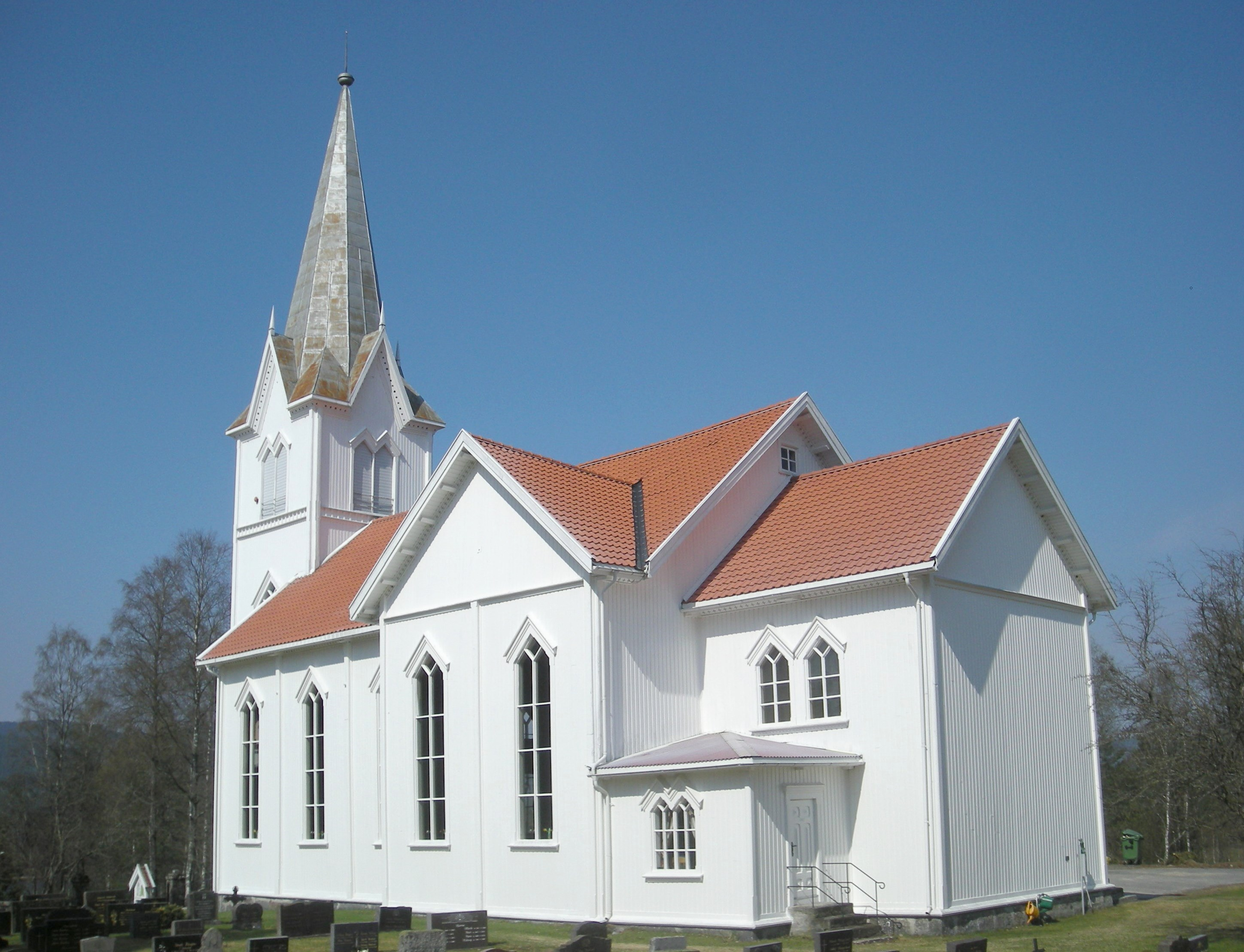
- View of the church
- Evje Church
- 58.599266°N 07.831205°E
- Location: Evje og Hornnes, Agder
- Country: Norway
- Denomination: Church of Norway
- Previous denomination: Catholic Church
- Churchmanship: Evangelical Lutheran

History
- Status: Parish church
- Founded: 13th century
- Consecrated: 16 Dec 1891

Architecture
- Functional status: Active
- Architectural type: Cruciform
- Style: Swiss chalet style
- Completed: 1891 (135 years ago)

Specifications
- Capacity: 450
- Materials: Wood

Administration
- Diocese: Agder og Telemark
- Deanery: Otredal prosti
- Parish: Evje og Hornnes
- Norwegian Cultural Heritage Site
- Type: Church
- Status: Automatically protected
- ID: 84108

Evje Church (Norwegian: Evje kyrkje) is a parish church of the Church of Norway in Evje og Hornnes Municipality in Agder county, Norway. It is located at the north end of the village of Evje. It is one of the churches for the Evje og Hornnes parish which is part of the Otredal prosti (deanery) in the Diocese of Agder og Telemark. The white, wooden church was built in a Swiss chalet style with a cruciform design in 1891 using plans drawn up by an unknown architect. The church seats about 450 people.

== History ==
The earliest existing historical records of the church date back to the year 1328, but the church was not new that year. The old stave church was likely built in the 13th century. In 1660, the old building was heavily renovated and rebuilt. It originally had a hallway around the exterior which was removed at that time.

In 1814, this church served as an election church (Norwegian: valgkirke). Together with more than 300 other parish churches across Norway, it was a polling station for elections to the 1814 Norwegian Constituent Assembly which wrote the Constitution of Norway. This was Norway's first national elections. Each church parish was a constituency that elected people called "electors" who later met together in each county to elect the representatives for the assembly that was to meet at Eidsvoll Manor later that year.

In 1834, the old stave church was torn down and replaced with a new cruciform church which stood about 20 metres (66 ft) to the west of the old church. The new building was a small timber-framed church that was built by Anders Thorsen Syrtveit. The new building was consecrated on 6 December 1835. In 1876 it received a new church bell (from Gloucester in England). In 1891, the church was deemed too small for the parish, so it was torn down and a larger building was constructed on the same site, reusing some of the materials from the previous building. The new building was constructed by builder Ludvig Karlsen from Stokken. The new building is strictly-speaking a cruciform design since there are shallow transverse arms on either side of the building, but practically speaking, it is a long church design since all of the pews face the same direction. The church was consecrated on 16 December 1891 by the Bishop Johan Christian Heuch. There are no old historic or artistic pieces in the church, everything in it was new when it was built in 1891.

== Media gallery ==
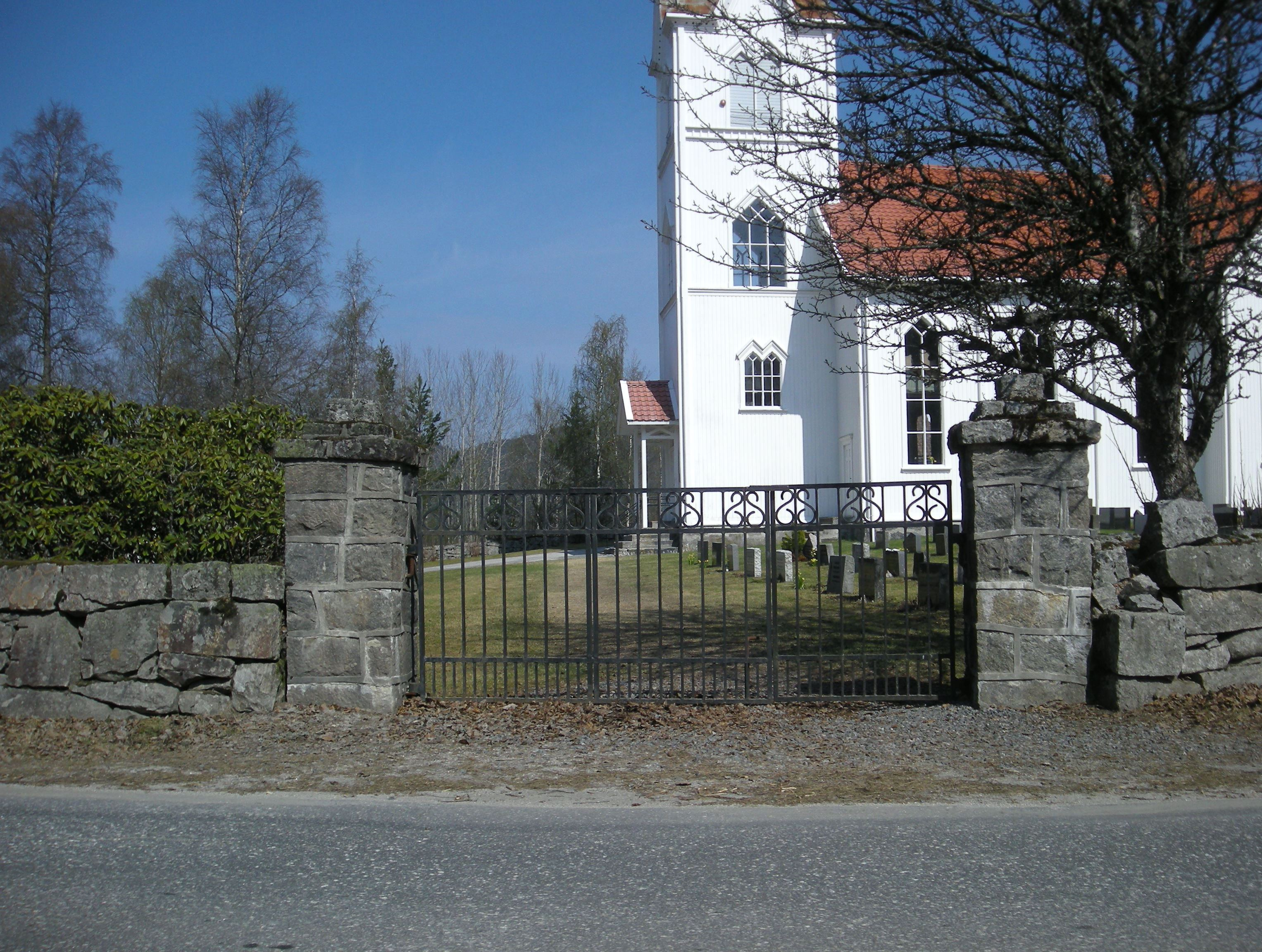

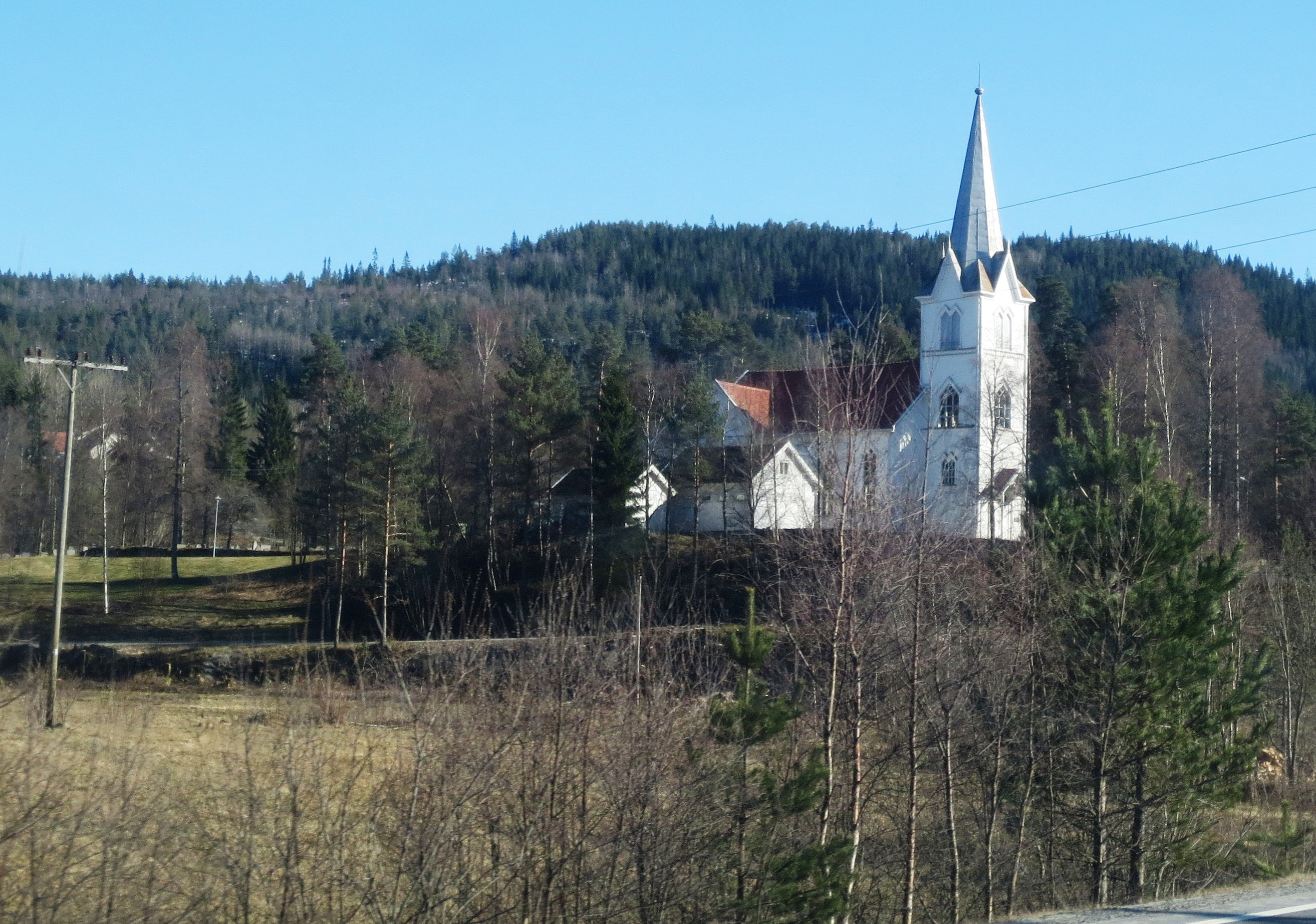

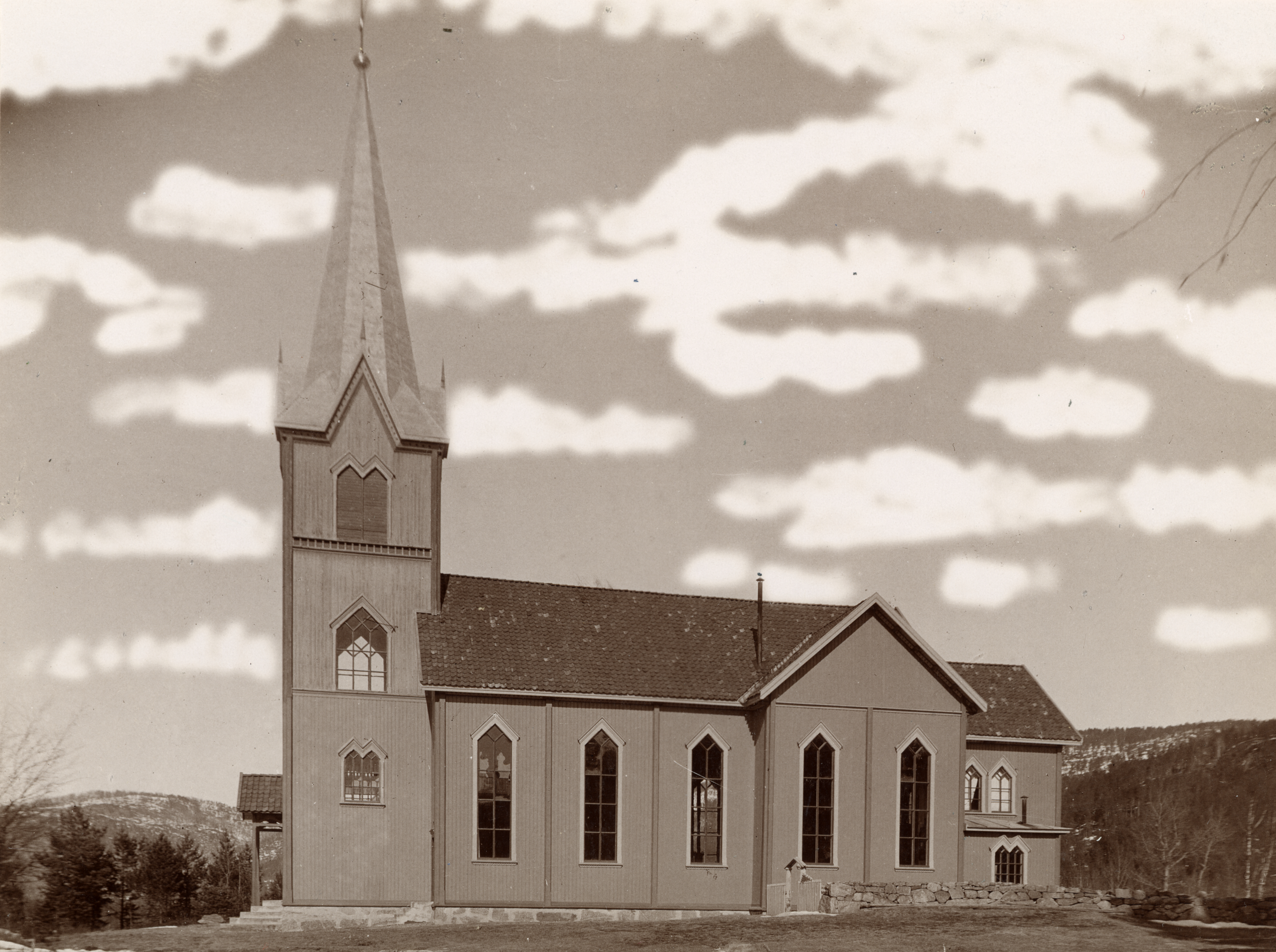

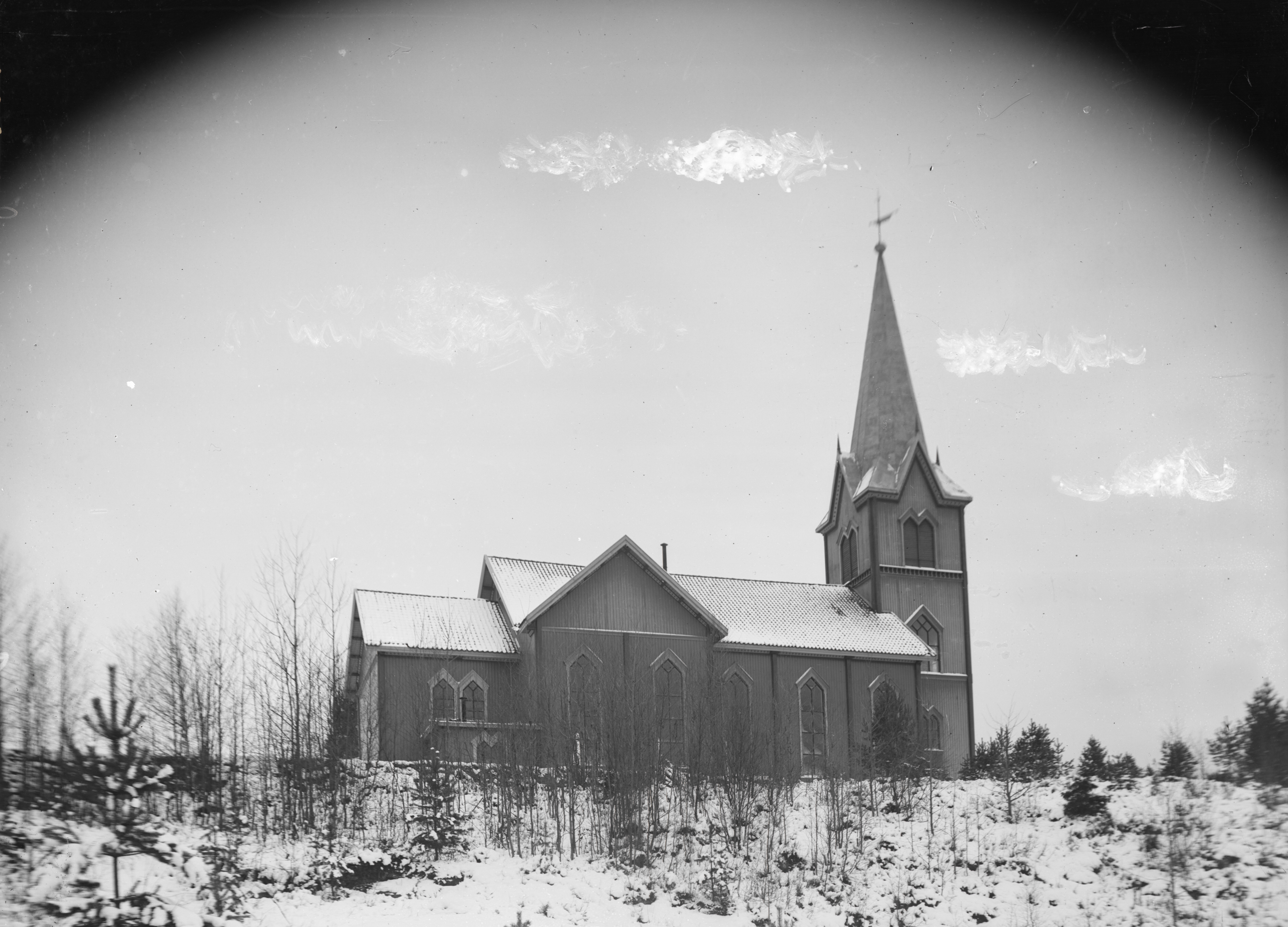

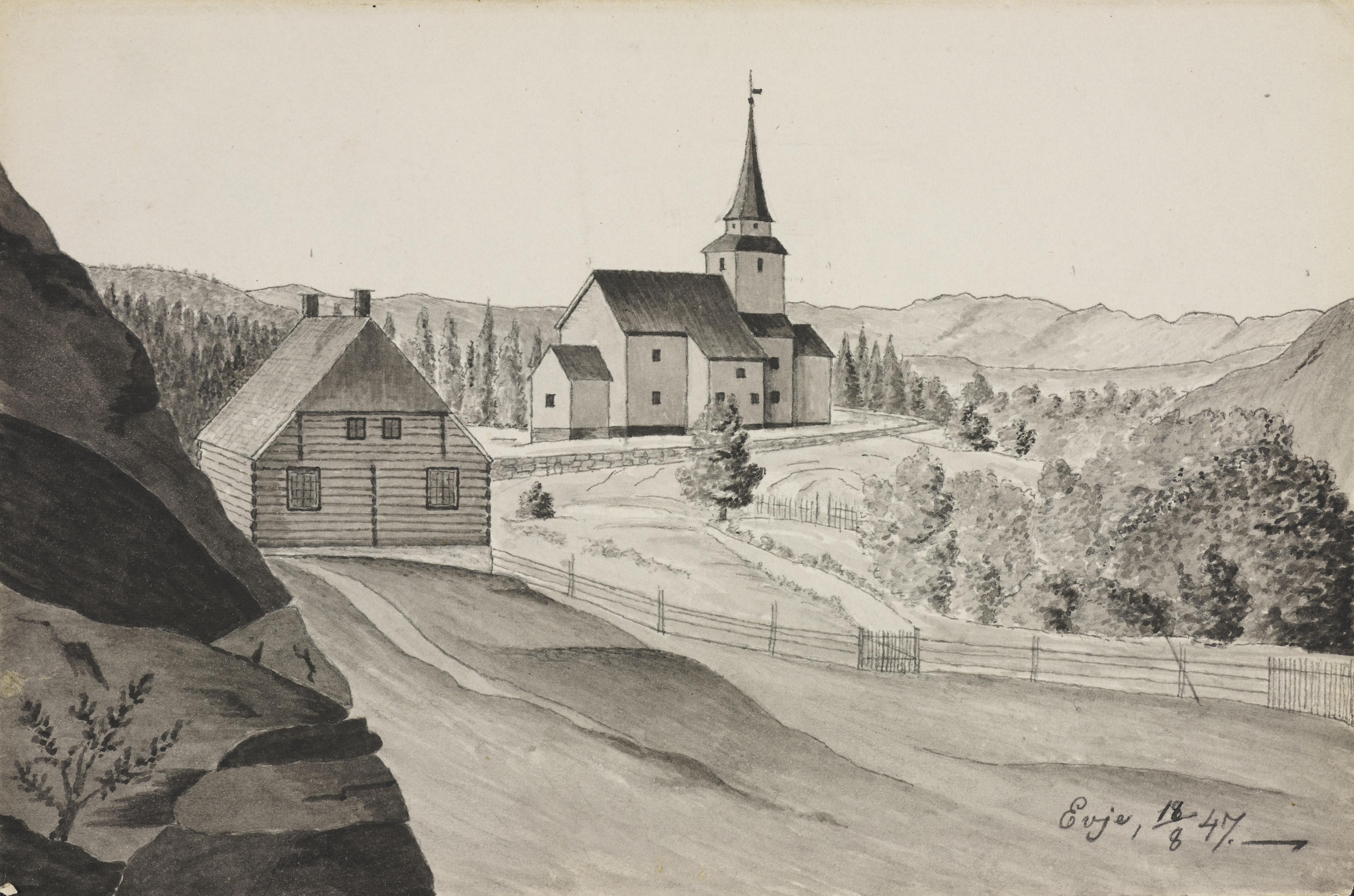
View of the old church (1835-1891)

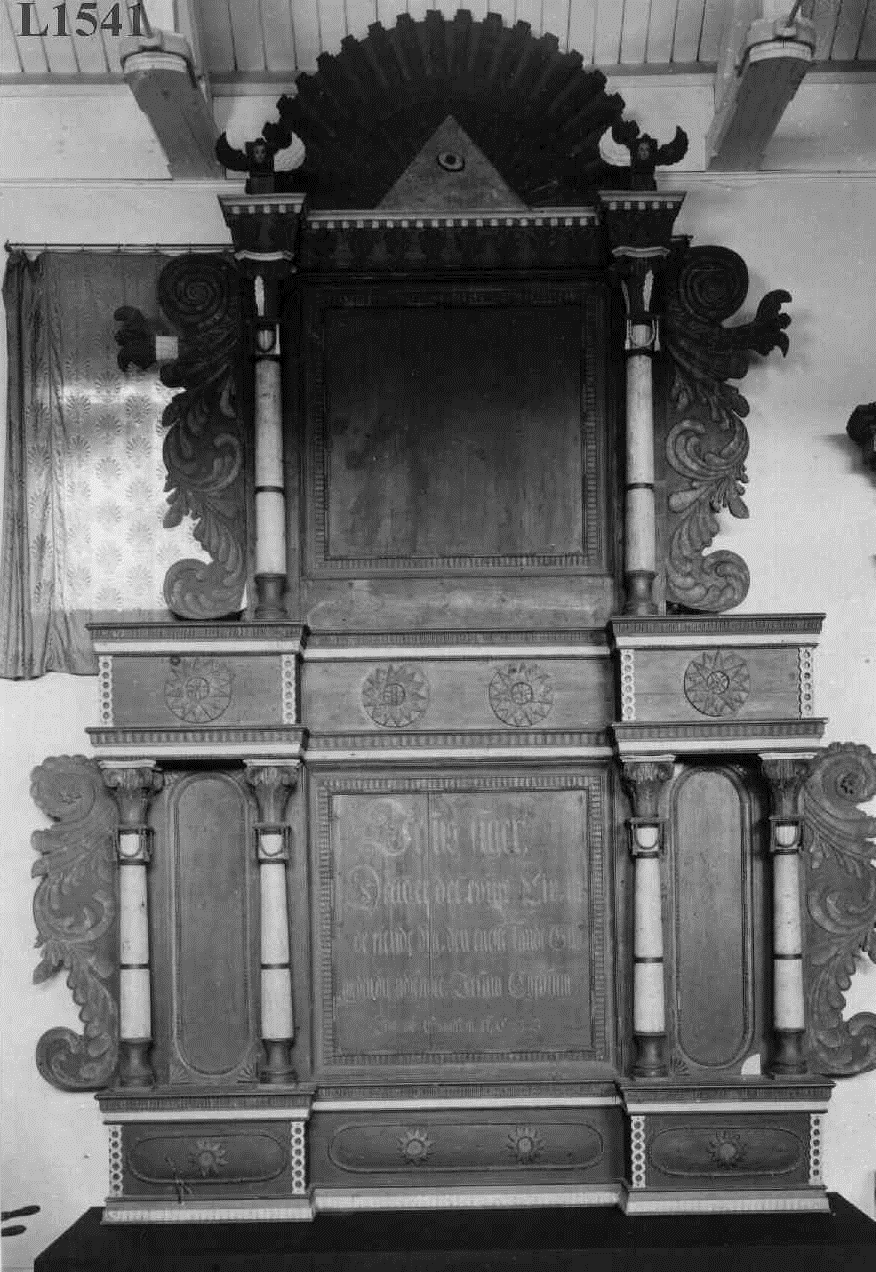
Altar table from the old Evje stave church

== See also ==
- List of churches in Agder og Telemark
