= Norwegian State Housing Bank =

- Company type: Government agency
- Industry: Social housing policy, Banking
- Founded: 1946
- Defunct: 31 December 2026
- Headquarters: Drammen, Norway
- Area served: Norway
- Key people: Bård Øistensen (CEO)
- Number of employees: 375 (2007)
- Parent: Norwegian Ministry of Local Government
- Website: www.husbanken.no

The Norwegian State Housing Bank (Norwegian: Husbanken) is a Norwegian Government agency responsible for the housing politics in Norway. The main tool for the bank is mortgages in newly constructed houses. About half of all houses after World War II in Norway have been financed by the Housing Bank. The agency is based in Drammen and was created by a 1946 law. Total assets were NOK 102 billion in 2002. As such, it is one of the largest banks of Norway.

The bank has three distinct goals:

1. Stimulation to achieve a well functioning housing market.
2. Provision of housing for groups that are disadvantaged on the housing market.
3. Increase the number of environmentally friendly and universally designed dwellings and residential areas.
