= List of national costumes of Norway =

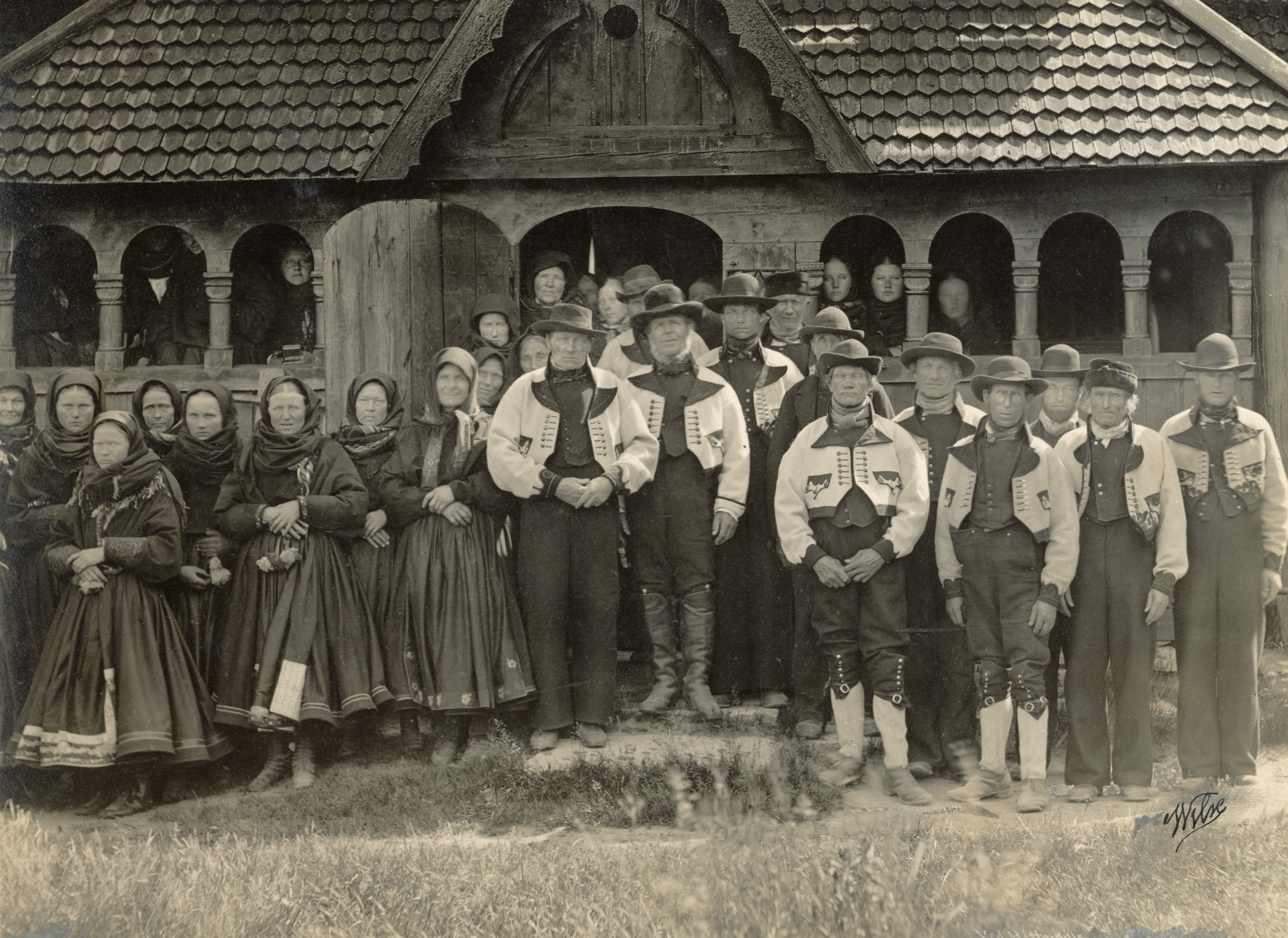
Rural people in folk costume outside Heddal Stave Church in Telemark

This is a list of national costumes, mainly bunads, worn by either members of the Norwegian people or members of the Sami people of Norway or members of the Kven people of Norway.

== Rural clothes vs. folk costumes ==
Bunad is a Norwegian umbrella term encompassing a range of both traditional rural clothes mostly dating to the 19th and 18th centuries as well as 20th-century folk costumes. In its narrow sense, the word bunad refers only to clothes designed in the early 20th century that are loosely based on traditional costumes. The word bunad is in itself a 20th-century invention.

The Sami people use their distinctive traditional costumes, especially on festive occasions. Kven people also have their traditional Finnish inspired clothing.

== Bunads by province ==
The term drakt is used for the ensemble of clothing worn by either a man or a woman. In some districts the folk costume will be called drakt, and in other districts the term bunad has taken precedence.

=== Østfold ===
- Østfoldbunad
- Løkendrakt
- Smaalenenes mannsbunad (male costume from the district of Smaalenene
- Fredrikstaddrakt
- Eidsbergdrakt
- Hobøldrakt
- Hvalerdrakt
- Mossedrakt
- Festdrakt til Østfoldrosen

=== Oslo and Akershus ===
- Romeriksbunad
- Hurdalsbunad
- Eidsvollsbunad
- Lillestrømsdrakt
- Follobunad
- Bærumsbunad
- Askerbunad
- Akerdrakt
- Oslodrakt
- Sørkedalsbunad

=== Hedmark ===
- Hedmarksbunad
- Vallsetbunad
- Østerdalsbunad
- Sør-Østerdalsbunad
- Nord-Østerdalsbunad
- Kviknebunad
- Folldalsbunad
- Dalåsstakk
- Lødrupbunad
- Maria Aaen-bunad
- Alvdalsbunad
- Trysilbunad
- Solør og Odalsbunad
- Finnskogsbunad
- Lundebydrakt
- Vålerdrakt
- Brattfossdrakt
- Lunderseterdrakt
- Hedemarksbunad – 1955 – modell
- Hedemarksbunad – 1985 – modell
- Rekonstruert kvinnebunad fra Hedemarken

=== Oppland ===
- Gudbrandsdalsbunad
- Lesjabunad
- Grafferbunad
- Gausdalsbundad
- Dovrebunad
- Jordebunad
- Lillehammerbunad
- Hadelandsbunad
- Totendrakt
- Vestopplandbunad
- Valdresbunad
- Etnedalskjolen
- Rondastakk og rutaliv
- Trykktykjol
- Gudbrandsdalens mannsbunad
- Kvinnebunad fra Gudbransdalen
- Gudbrandsdalens festbunad
- Damask-kjol
- 1700-talls mannsbunad og kvinnebunad fra Gudbransdalen
- Landingsdrakt
- Totendrakt
- Den gamle Valdresbunaden
- Den nye Valdresbunaden
- Rutastakken fra Valdres
- Mannsbunad fra Valdres

=== Buskerud ===
- Stakker fra Hallingdal
- Mannsbunad fra Hallingdal
- Festbunad fra Nedre Hallingdal
- Brudebunad fra Hallingdal
- Ringeriksbunad
- Den gamle Ringeriksdrakt
- Flesbergstakk
- Skjælingskleda fra Øvre Numedal
- Gråtrøye
- Rundtrøye
- Bergmannsdrakt fra Kongsberg

=== Vestfold ===
- Vestfold Husflidslags
- Kvinnebunad – 1932-modell
- Vestfold Husflidslags kvinnebunad – 1956-modell
- Vestfold Husflidslags mannsbunad

=== Telemark ===
- Øst-Telemark Stakk og Liv
- Øst-Telemark Raudtrøyebunad
- Øst-Telemark Beltestakk
- Øst-Telemark Tinn-bunad
- Øst-Telemark Gråtrøye
- Kvinnebunad fra Vest-Telemark
- Vest-Telemark Bringerklutbunad
- Vest-Telemark Gråtrøye
- Vest-Telemark Svart modell og Rundtrøye

=== Aust-Agder ===
- Åmlibunad fra Aust-Agder for kvinner
- Åmlibunad fra Aust-Agder for menn
- Setesdalsbunad

=== Vest-Agder ===
- Mannsdrakt fra Vest-Agder
- Kvinnedrakt fra Vest-Agder, Stripestakk
- Kvinnedrakt fra Vest-Agder
- Rynkestakk og Plissestakk
- Brudedrakt fra Vest-Agder
- Øyebunaden

=== Rogaland ===
- Rogalandsbunad herre
- Husflidens Rogalandsbunad, Mønster "Løland"
- Kronebunad fra Rogaland

=== Hordaland ===
- Askøybunad
- Fanabunad
- Hardangerbunad
- Nordhordlandsbunad
- Sunnhordalandsbunad
- Vinterbunad fra Voss
- Konebunad fra Voss
- Jentebunad fra Voss
- Brudebunad fra Voss

=== Sogn og Fjordane ===
- Nordfjordbunad
- Sognebunad
- Sunnfjordbunad

=== Møre og Romsdal ===
- Nordmørsbunaden
- Norddalsbunaden
- Ørskogbunaden
- Skodjebunaden
- Strandabunaden
- Hjørundfjordbunaden
- Jentebunaden fra Sunnmøre
- Sykkylsvsbunaden
- Vigrabunaden
- Søre Sunnmørebunaden
- Mannsbunad fra Sunnmøre
- Guttebunad fra Sunnmøre
- Brun mannsbunad fra Sunnmøre
- Kvinnedrakt fra Sunnmøre
- Kronebunad fra Sunnmøre
- Rindalsbunaden
- Brudedrakt for Nordmøre
- Ørstabunaden

=== Sør-Trøndelag ===
- Oppdalsbunaden
- Trønderbunaden
- Tydalsdrakten
- Selbubunad
- Aure/Hemnebunad

=== Nord-Trøndelag ===
- Nord-trønderbunad

=== Nordland ===
- Nordlandsbunaden
- Hamarøybunaden
- Lofotbunaden
- Mannsbunad for Nordland/Troms
- Ofotbunaden
- Sámi costumes (See Finnmark)

=== Troms ===
- Mannsbunad for Nordland/Troms
- Tromsbunaden for kvinner
- Kvænangsbunaden
- Målselvbunaden
- Lenvikdrakten
- Senjadrakten
- Sámi costumes (See also Finnmark)

=== Finnmark ===
- Finnmarksbunad
- Gákti/Luhkka (Sámi costumes)
- Kvendrakta (Kven costume)

=== Svalbard ===
- Svalbardbunad
