= Bunad =

National costume of Norway

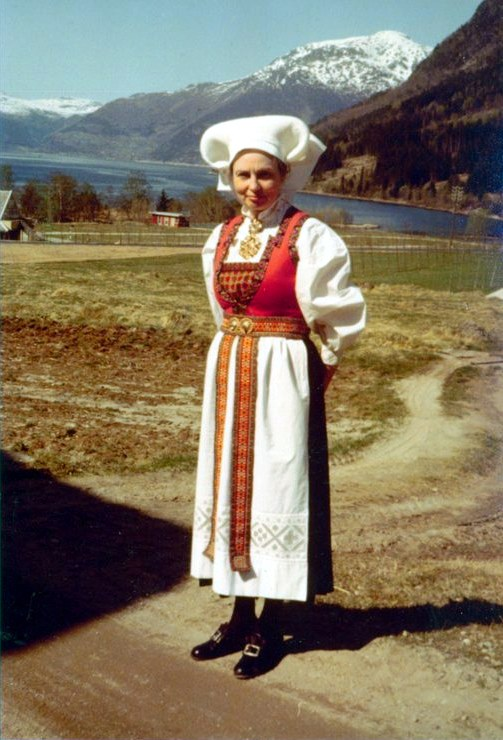
Woman's bunad from Hardangerfjord. The headpiece, called a skaut, is worn by married women from Hardanger. Other headpieces are worn by Hardanger women, including beaded caps worn by young girls, and headband-like wraps worn by young unmarried women. (See also Hardangerbunad)

Bunad (Norwegian: [ˈbʉ̂ːnɑd], plural: bunader/bunadar) is a Norwegian umbrella term. In a broader sense, the term encompasses household, householding equipment, and livestock as well as both traditional rural clothes (mostly dating to the 18th and 19th centuries) and modern 20th-century folk costumes. In its narrowest sense, the word bunad refers only to clothes designed in the early 20th century that are loosely based on traditional costumes.

The bunad movement has its root in 19th-century national romanticism, which included an interest for traditional folk costumes not only in Norway, but also in neighbouring countries such as Denmark and notably Germany. However, in Norway, national romanticist ideas had a more lasting impact, as seen in the use of folk-inspired costumes.

== History ==
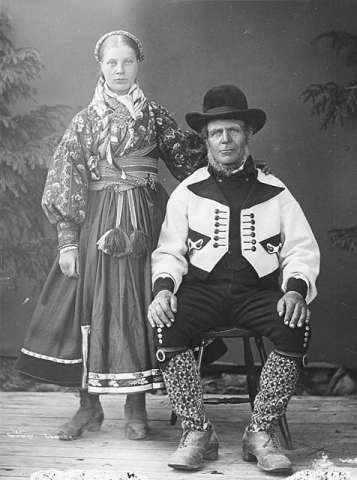
Traditional folk clothing of eastern Telemark, 1880s

The bunad movement has been carried forward by enthusiasts all over the country and new bunad variations are frequently created and proposed for approval. Designers such as Lise Skjåk Bræk have developed entire lines of costumes based on the bunad tradition. In the field of folk costumes it is common to differentiate between bunad and folk costume, the latter being the local dress in previous times with all its variations and use. Modern interpretations of these costumes have often modified or done away with completely parts of the traditional dresses in order to align them with a more conventional idea of beauty and fashion. For example, few Norwegians still use the headdresses and headpieces that were a part of the traditional costumes, preferring instead to show their hair, in accord with modern, Western fashions. These headdresses, like the one in the photo at the top of this article, were often seen as the most important part of the costume for native practitioners of the customs as the headdress often indicated an individual's social or marital status.

There is a continuing debate about the extent to which bunads must conform to the standards, or whether it is acceptable to vary or improvise based on general themes. Some groups (sometimes derisively referred to as the bunad police) argue that bunads must be sewn and worn according to strict standards; others advocate a more creative, lenient approach. Traditionally it is correct for women to wear proper bunad shoes and purses, and to avoid wearing sunglasses, earrings, and heavy makeup when dressed in a bunad.

Bunads are nowadays often viewed as a status symbol, ranging in the price of $2,000−10,000, depending on the desired design, material, embroidery, gold, silver and accessories. The price also depends on whether the customer buys from a well-established company like Husfliden, from local sewers or decides to sew or do part of the embroidery themselves. It usually takes up to a year to finish making the bunad, and it has become a tradition for parents to give their children a bunad as a confirmation gift, which they will wear on their confirmation day.

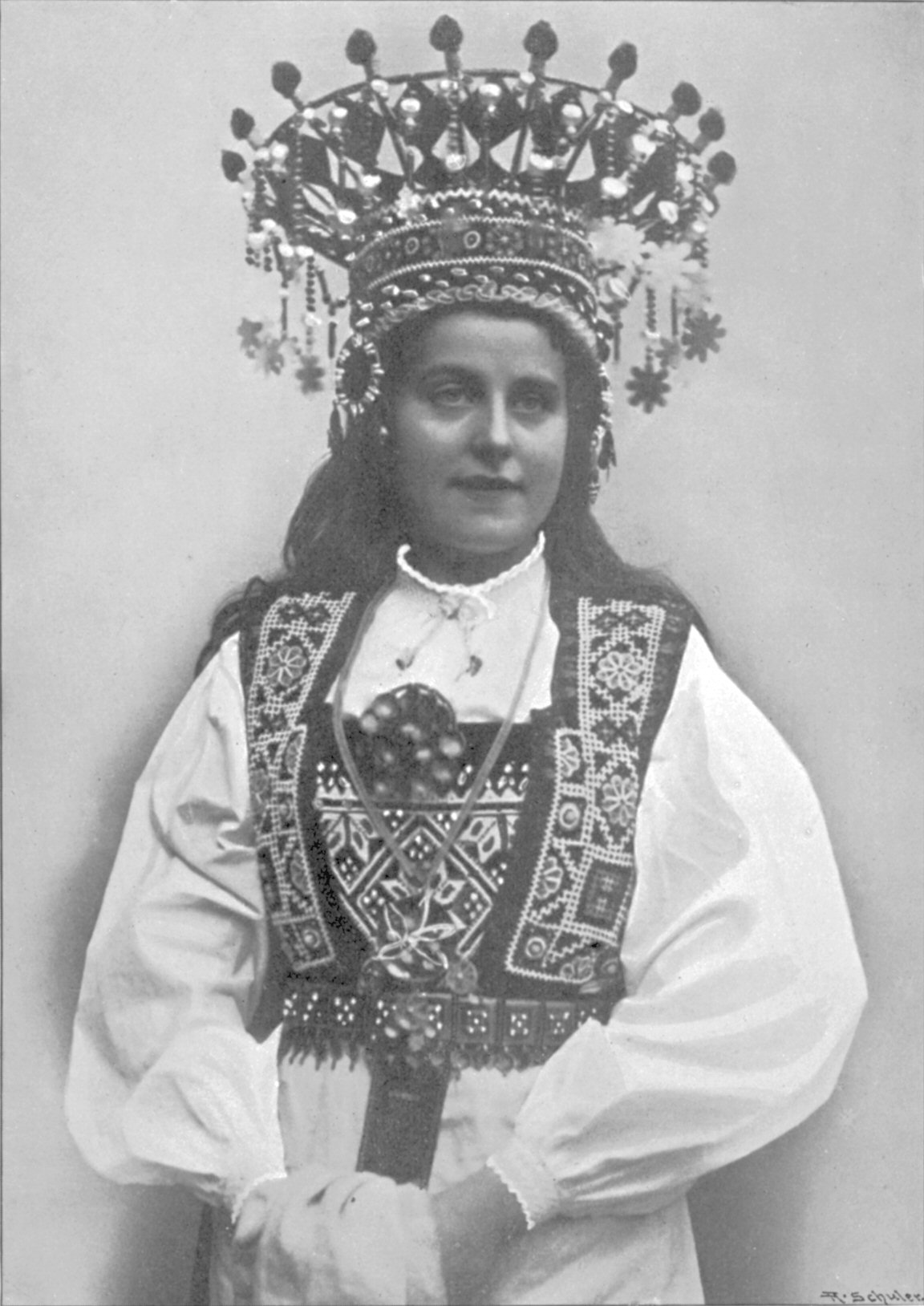
Hardanger bunad with a bridal crown (brudekrone)

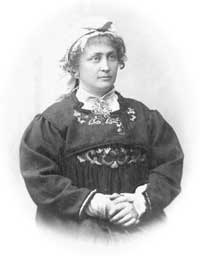
Hulda Garborg in bunad

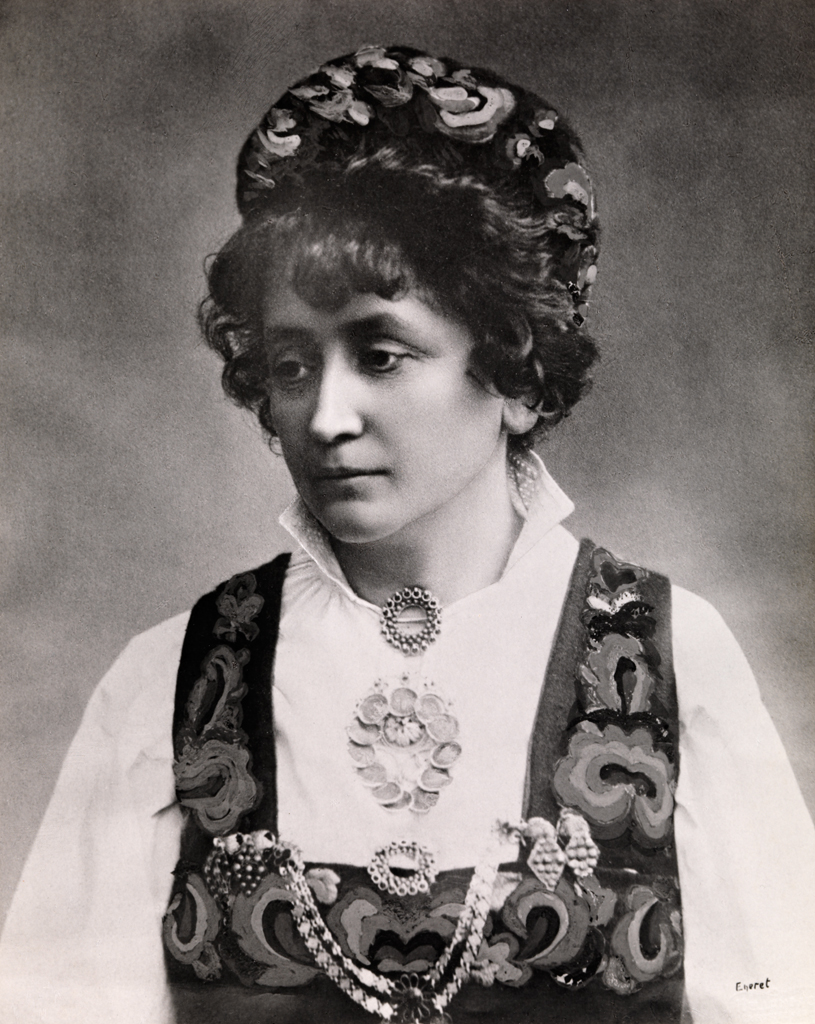
Hulda Garborg in bunad

Norwegian immigrants in the U.S. wearing their traditional bunads

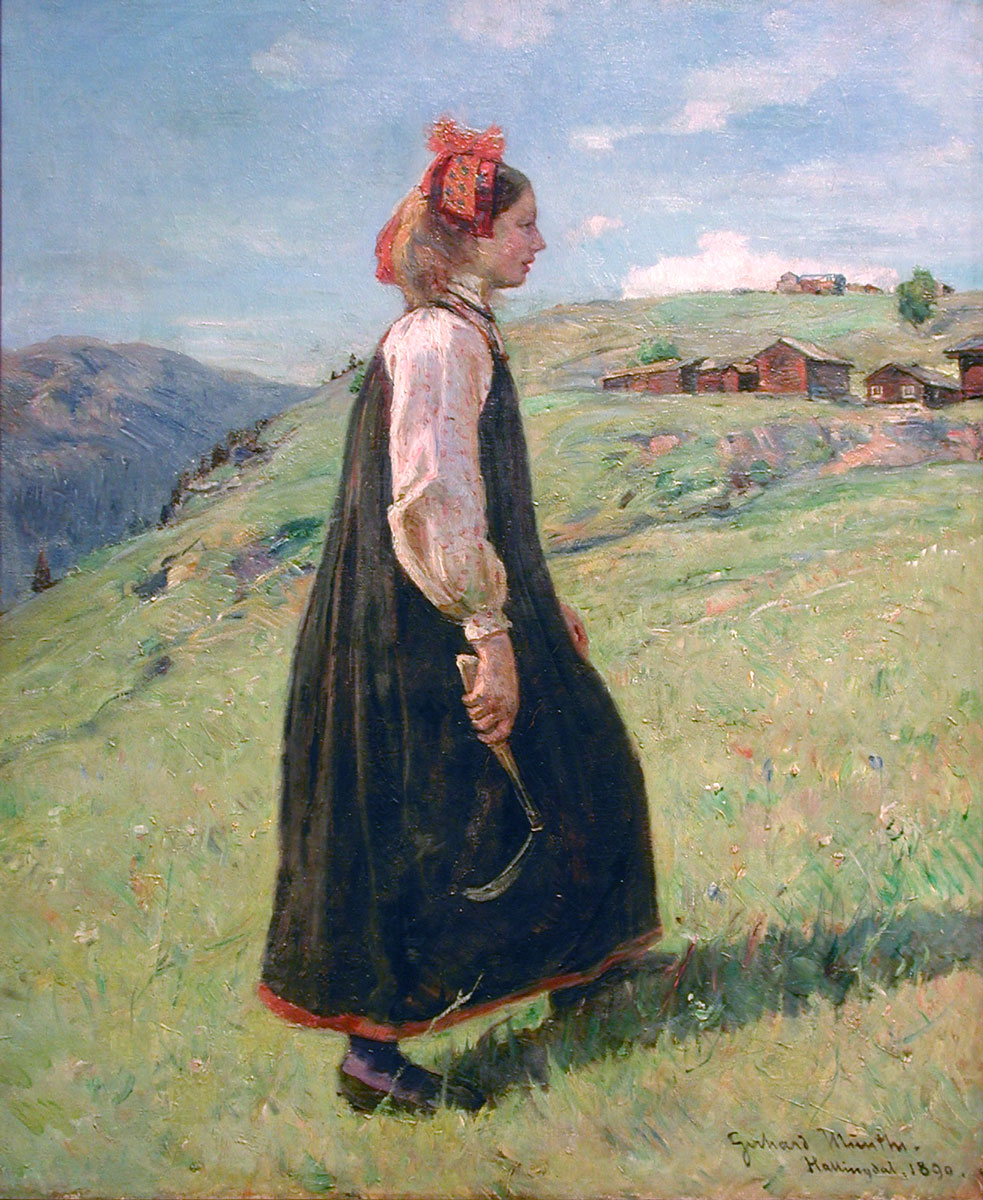
Budeia - painting by Gerhard Munthe (1890)

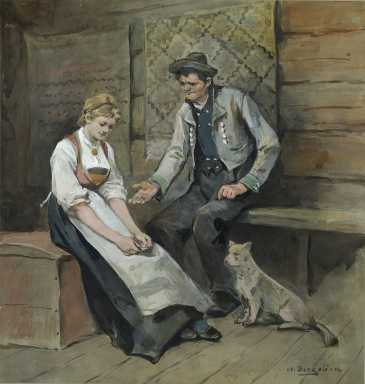
Frieriet – painting by Nils Bergslien (1853–1928)

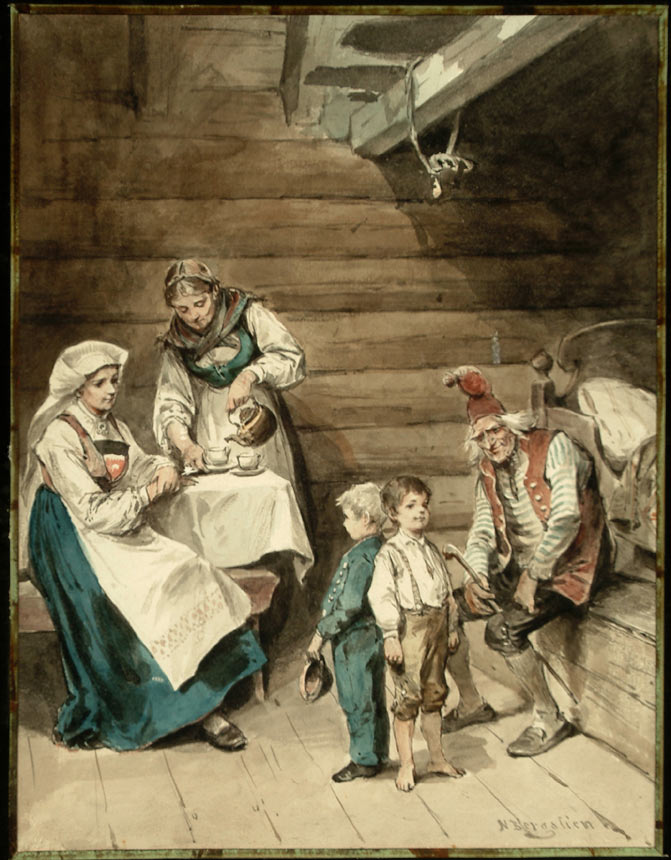
Kven er størst måttru – painting by Nils Bergslien (1853–1928)

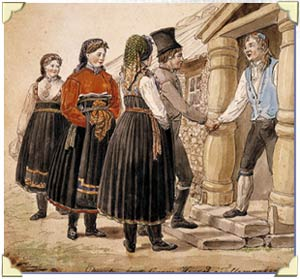
Folkedrakter fra Gran i Telemark – painting by Johannes Flintoe

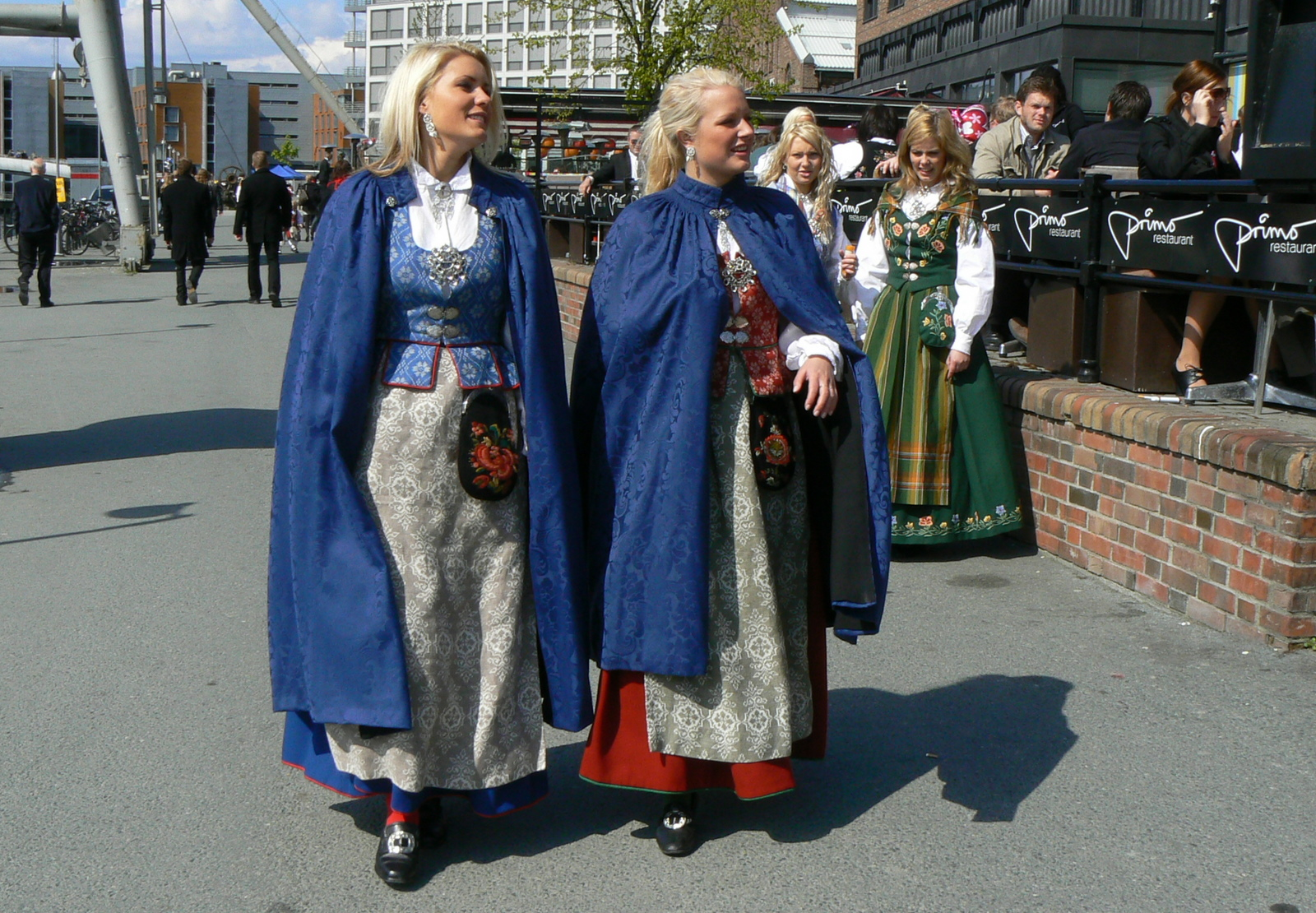
Two young women in bunad in Trøndelag

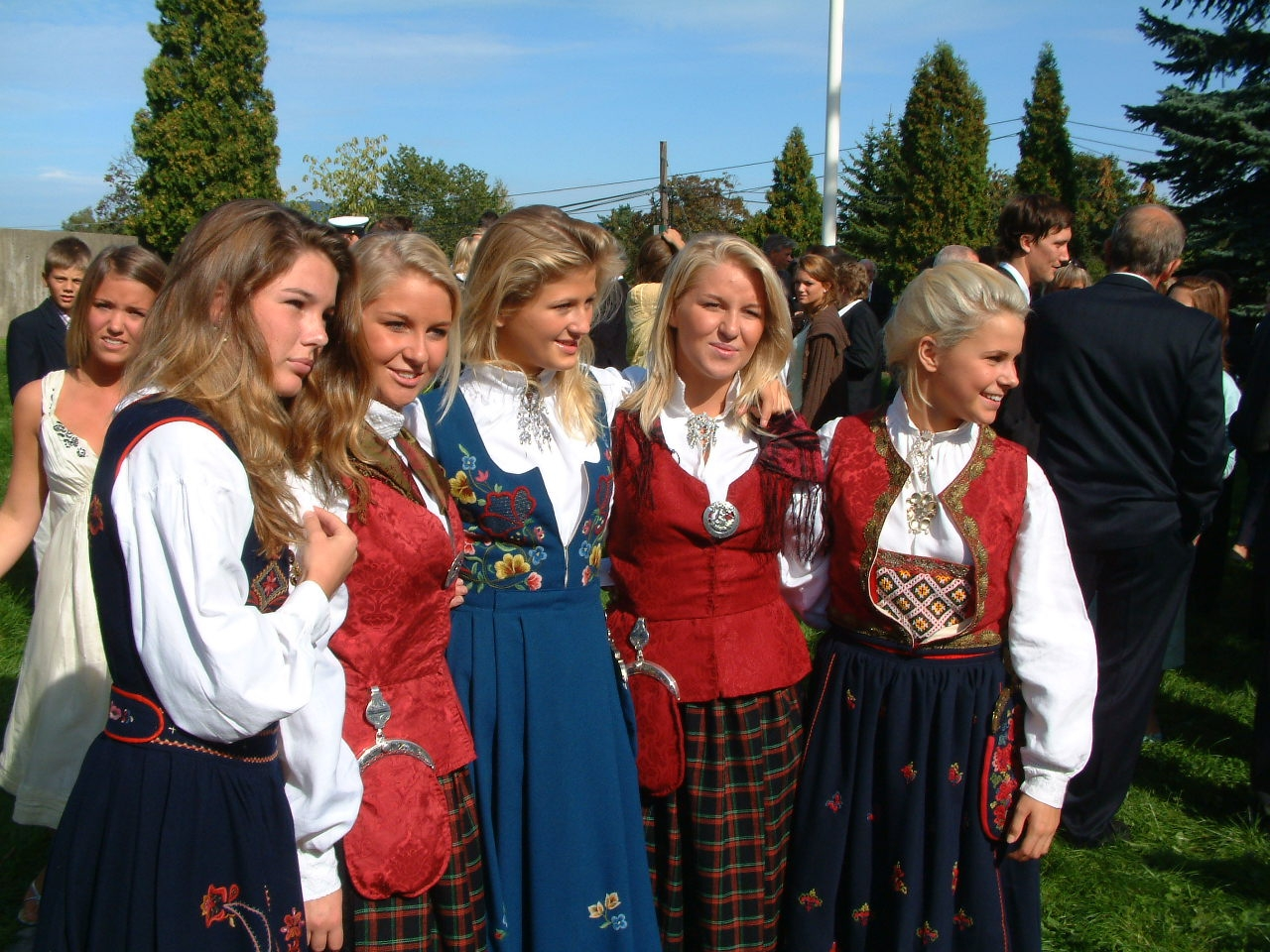
Young girls in different national costumes at Akershus

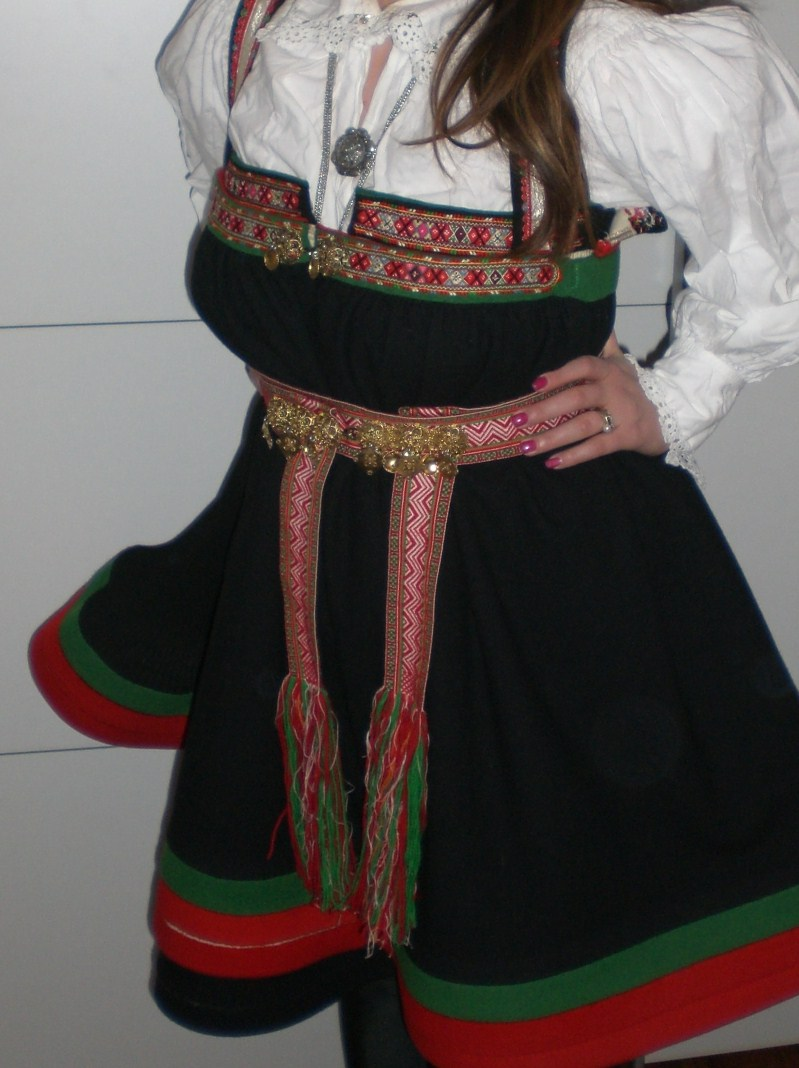
Setesdalsbunad from Setesdal (female)

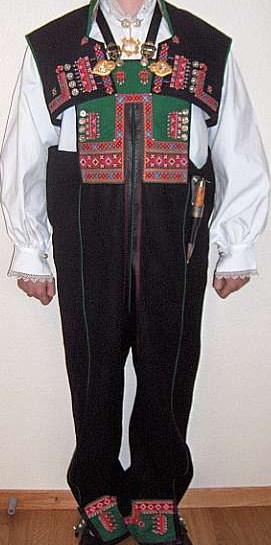
Setesdalsbunad (male)

== Traditions ==
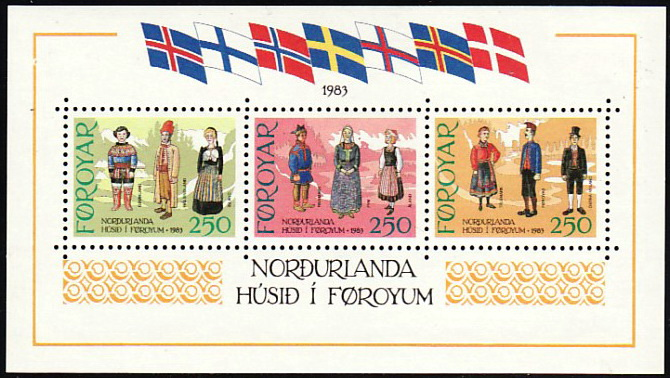
Nordic bunad and folk dress on Faroe Islands stamps

In Norway in the postwar era, especially in more recent times, it is common, but by no means mandatory, to wear bunad at various celebrations such as: folk dances, weddings, baptisms, confirmations, Christmas, graduations and especially the May 17 National Day celebrations. In recent years, its use has reached far outside folk dancing, folk music, and particular holidays. Accepted as proper gala attire, it is increasingly common to see people, and especially women, dressed in bunad. The former Norwegian foreign minister, Thorvald Stoltenberg, made history by presenting his accreditation as ambassador to Margrethe II of Denmark dressed in a bunad. Bunads were also conspicuous among those present at the Blessing of the Reign of King Harald and Queen Sonja, demonstrating that the bunad is now considered acceptable as an alternative form of formal wear even on the most solemn public occasions.

There is ongoing debate about the official status of various outfits, and what allowed variations are. Due to ongoing discussions on the status of bunads, it is not possible to state accurately the number of different types of bunads in Norway, but most estimates place the number at around 200. In 1947 an official institution, the National Committee for Bunad-related Questions (Landsnemnda for Bunadspørsmål) was organized to act in an advisory capacity on all questions dealing with bunads in Norway. That function is presently assigned to the Norwegian Institute for Costume and Folk Costume (Norsk institutt for bunad og folkedrakt), a national institution dealing with documentation and research of folk costumes as a cultural expression. Since 2008, the institution's management has operated in cooperation with the Valdres Folkemuseum (Valdresmusea) with which it shares facilities in Fagernes. The institute has established an archive of costume registrations, photo, cut patterns and sketches, and writings of traditional material from various districts.

From the late 19th century until quite recently the image which was most commonly used to represent the Norwegian traditional rural dress in general was that of the Hardanger woman's bunad, but in more recent times this image is being increasingly superseded by that of the East Telemark woman's bunad. As the bunad most often is based upon older designs from specific areas, the particular bunad will get its name from that area. Most people with roots from an area will choose (if not the same) bunads from their own area or their (grand)parents birthplace. People in general will expect that your bunad represents an area that you have a strong connection to. However, there is no specific rule that states your choice, and you are free to pick whatever kind you like. In the meantime, local bunad-sellers might have some difficulties with getting the right bunad if it is not from their area.

== Origins ==
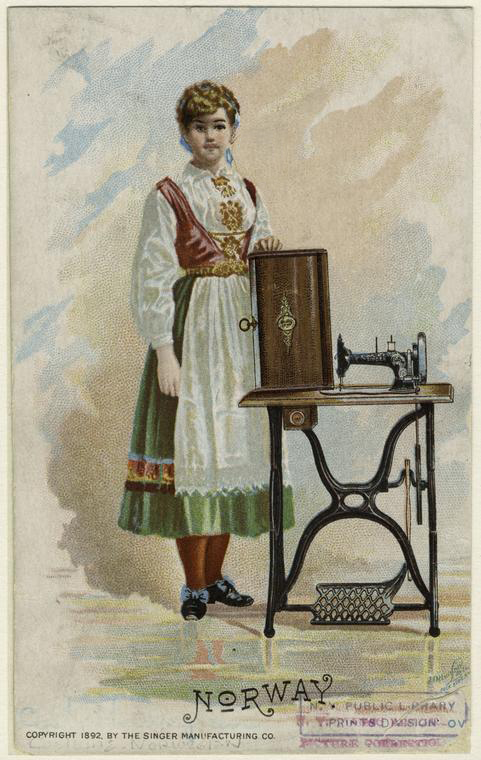
Woman in a traditional bunad, 1892

The various bunads have been designed through different means. Some of them are based on old local customs; other models are constructions made in the 20th century, relying (often very loosely) on local and historical material. The interest for bunads dates back to Norwegian romantic nationalism and gained increasing interest with the folk-dance movement at the beginning of the 20th century.

While the contemporary bunad tradition has most of its roots in folk costumes from the 18th and 19th centuries, records documenting the use of folk costumes go as far back as the Middle Ages. Setesdal in Southern Norway, for example, had a folk costume tradition dating back to the 14th century that remained relatively untouched until the middle of the 20th century. Norwegians from Setesdal still wear this time-honored traditional costume as a bunad today. Such long-standing folk costume traditions can be found all over Norway, but not all regions have retained these traditions as well as areas like Setesdal. In Trøndelag in central Norway, for example, the traditional costumes fell by the wayside in favor of modernized versions, but are now starting be revived in the local populations and used as conventional bunad again. The names of these traditional bunads are based on their geographic origin, and traditionally, people choose their bunad based on their own or their ancestors’ origin.

Hulda Garborg (1862–1934) and Klara Semb (1884–1970) are cited as pioneers in bringing bunads into mainstream culture. With Garborg's publication of the pamphlet Norsk Klædebunad in 1903, the focus moved from the creation of a single national costume to the development of several regional bunads. Although bunads are based on traditions in various areas, these designs are embellished by additions such as embroidery. The overarching sense of bunad design is to preserve the way people dressed for festive occasions in one particular era. This has led local and national councils to impose official constraints on various details in the bunad, including colors, fabric, embroidery, jewellery, cut, and allowable headwear.

== Designs and popularity ==
The designs are typically elaborate, with embroidery, scarves, shawls and hand-made silver or gold jewelry known as sølje. There are bunads both for men and women, although women's bunads are more diverse and popular. However, according to daily manager Turid Liss Agersborg at Husfliden Oslo, they now produce and sell more men's bunads than women's for the first time in history. The male customers are often characterized as urban and modern, and range between the ages of 20 and 40 years old.

== See also ==
- List of national costumes of Norway
