= Sølje =

Norwegian jewellery

The Sølje is an elaborately ornate brooch-like piece of jewellery from Norway. It is often worn with the Bunad as part of the national dress but sometimes on its own as jewellery.

They are traditionally made of silver. The word Sølje originally meant Shiny or Sunny and they are considered to have folkloric function.

== Examples of sølje ==
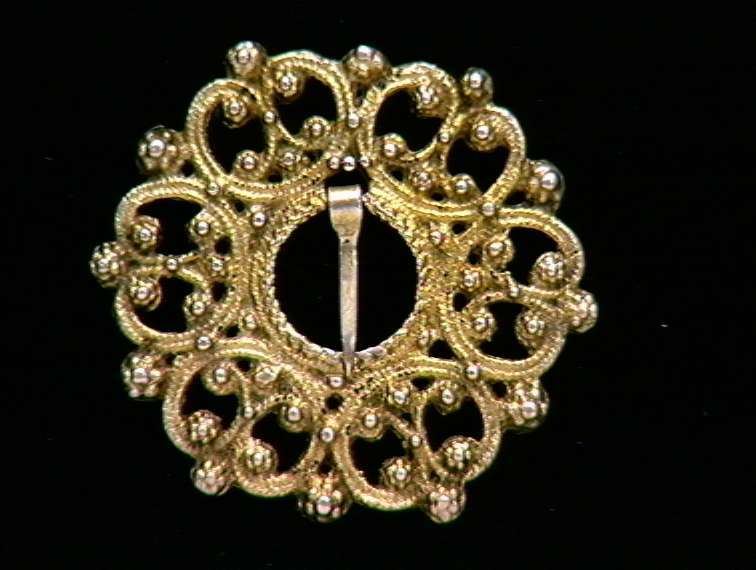

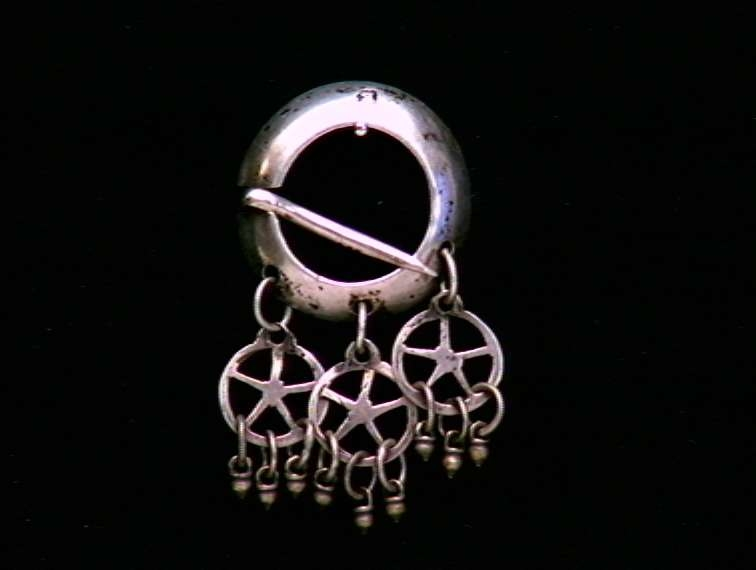

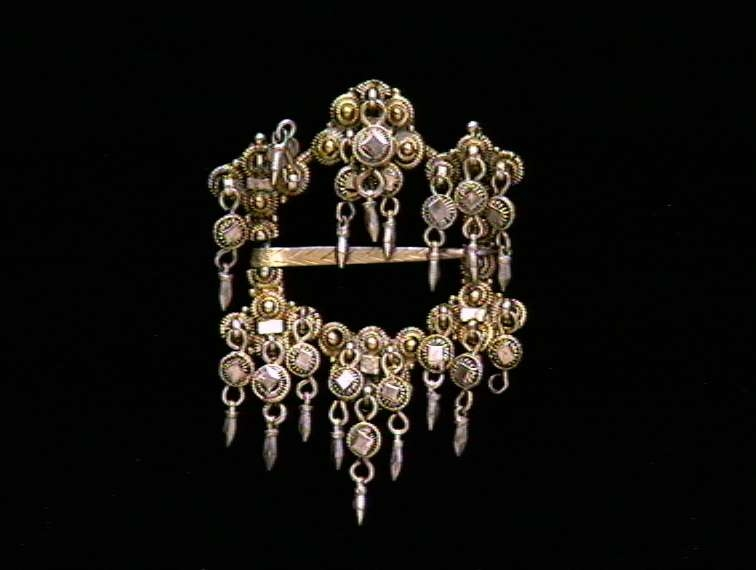

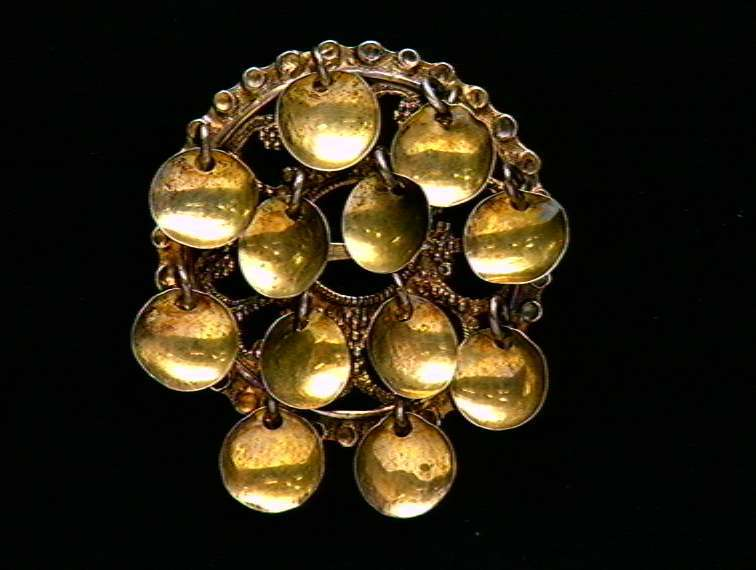
