= Setesdalsbunad =

Norwegian regional folk costume

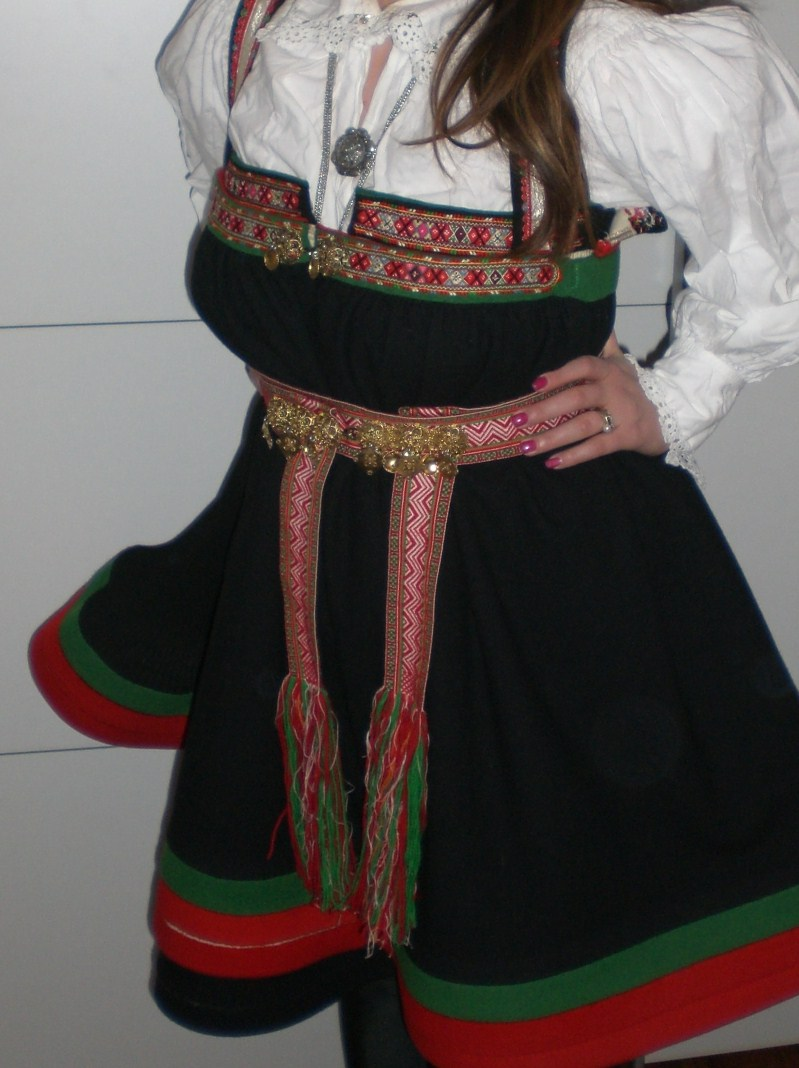
The Setesdalsbunad for women

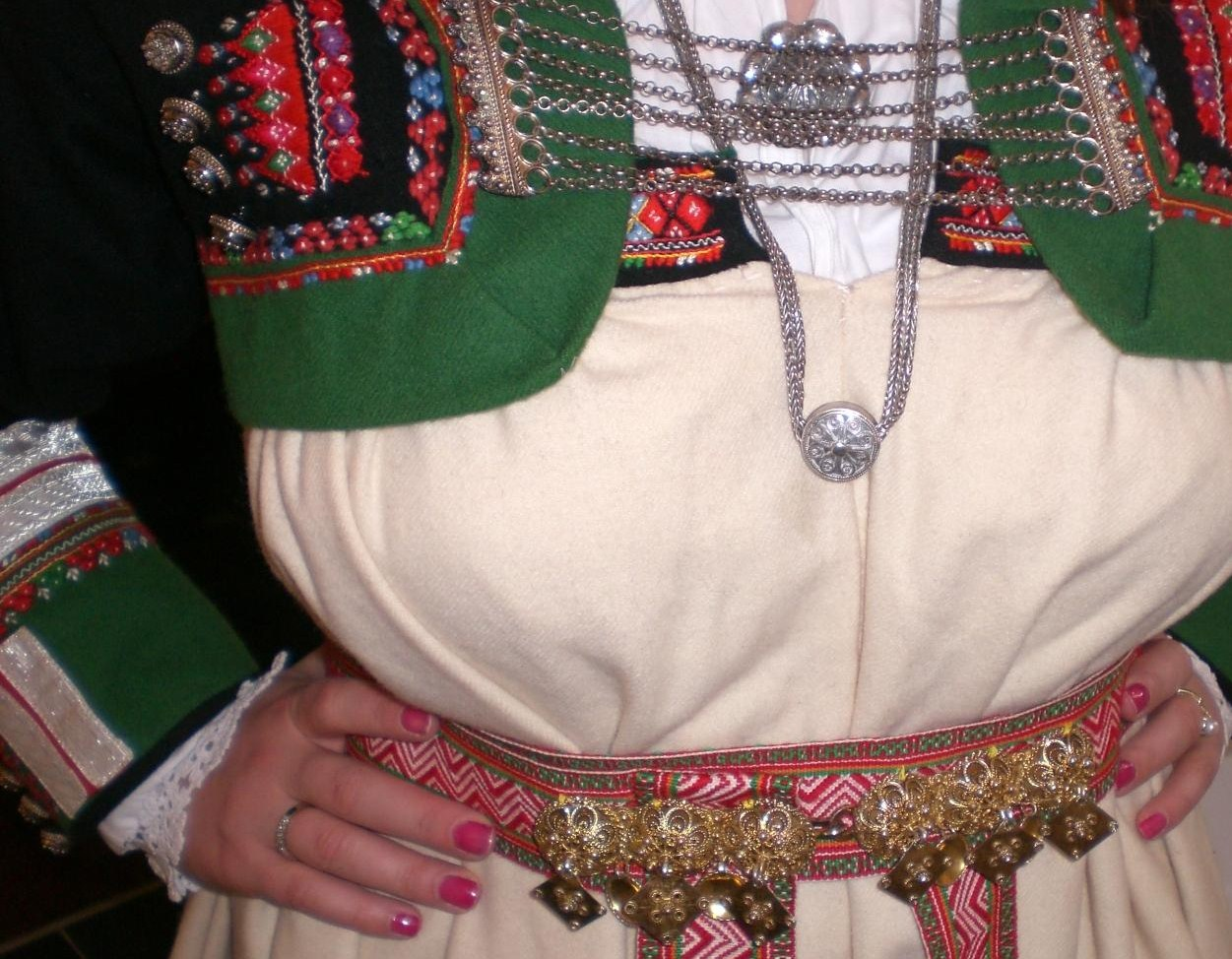
Silver Jewelry is used, along with the traditional Setesdalsbunad

Setesdalsbunad (lit. 'bunad from Setesdal') is a traditional bunad (folk costume) from Setesdal, Norway. It is a traditional costume based on the costume traditions from Valle Municipality, Bykle Municipality, and Bygland Municipality in the upper Setesdal valley areas of Agder county. In addition, this costume is one of the oldest costumes that have been used continuously for years, both in everyday life and for party use. The bunad has male and female versions with similar design and decorations. Today, the Setesdalsbunad remains as an outfit that is used to mark special occasions, including the Norwegian Constitution Day on 17 May each year. The female version of the Setesdalsbunad is a dress and the male version is a suit that is characterized by the back part which partially is made of leather.

== Image gallery ==
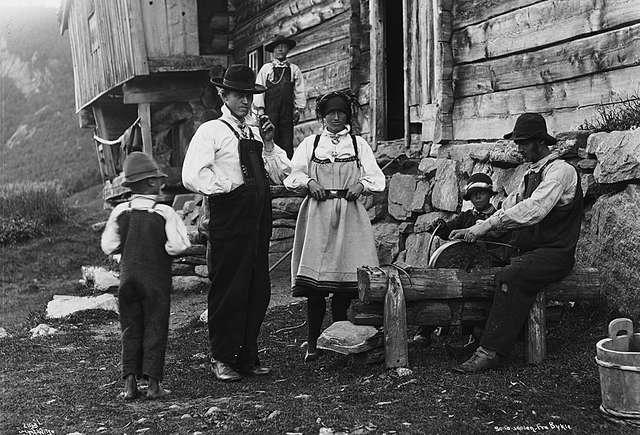
Older picture from Setesdal where the locals are wearing the local version of the national costume.

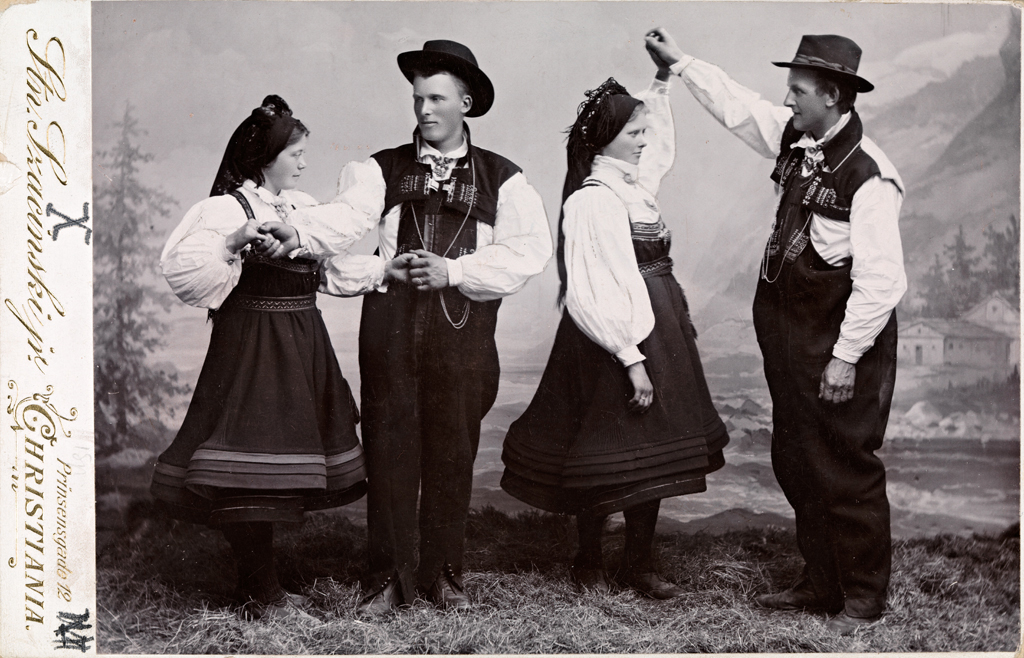
Costume dressed youth from Setesdal dancing, about 1905.

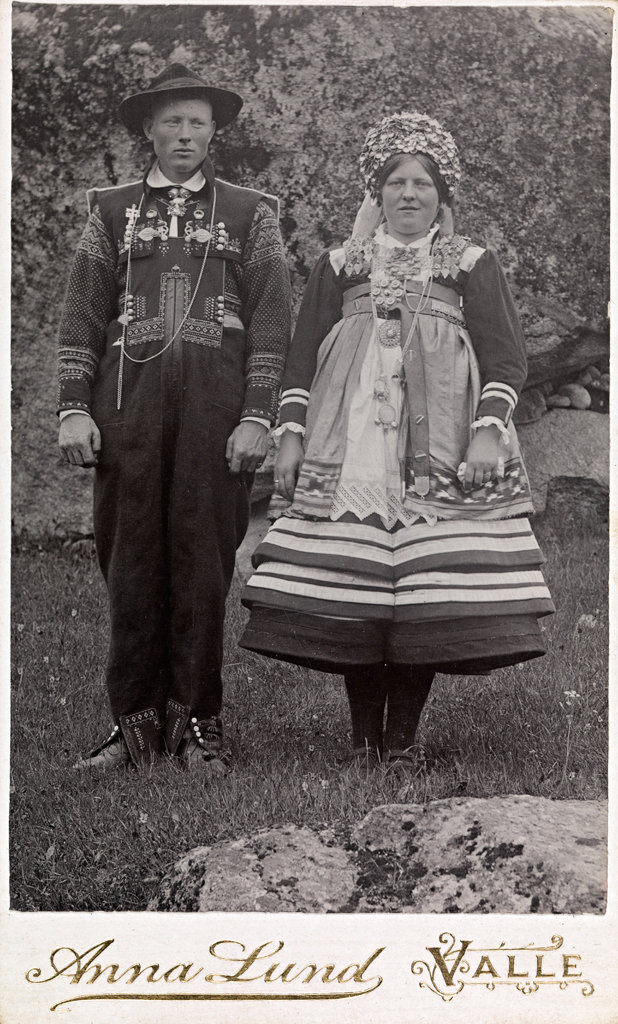
Bridal couple from Setesdal

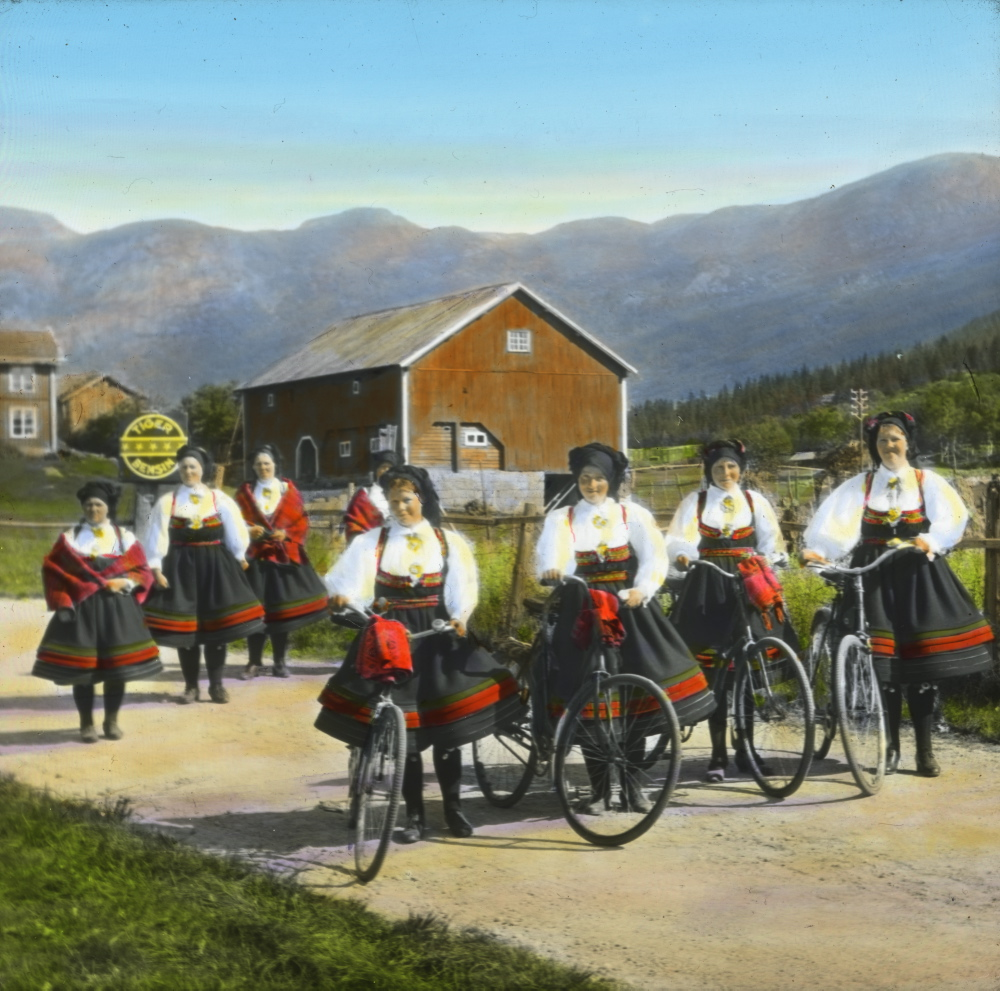
Local youth on their way to church in the middle of the 20th century

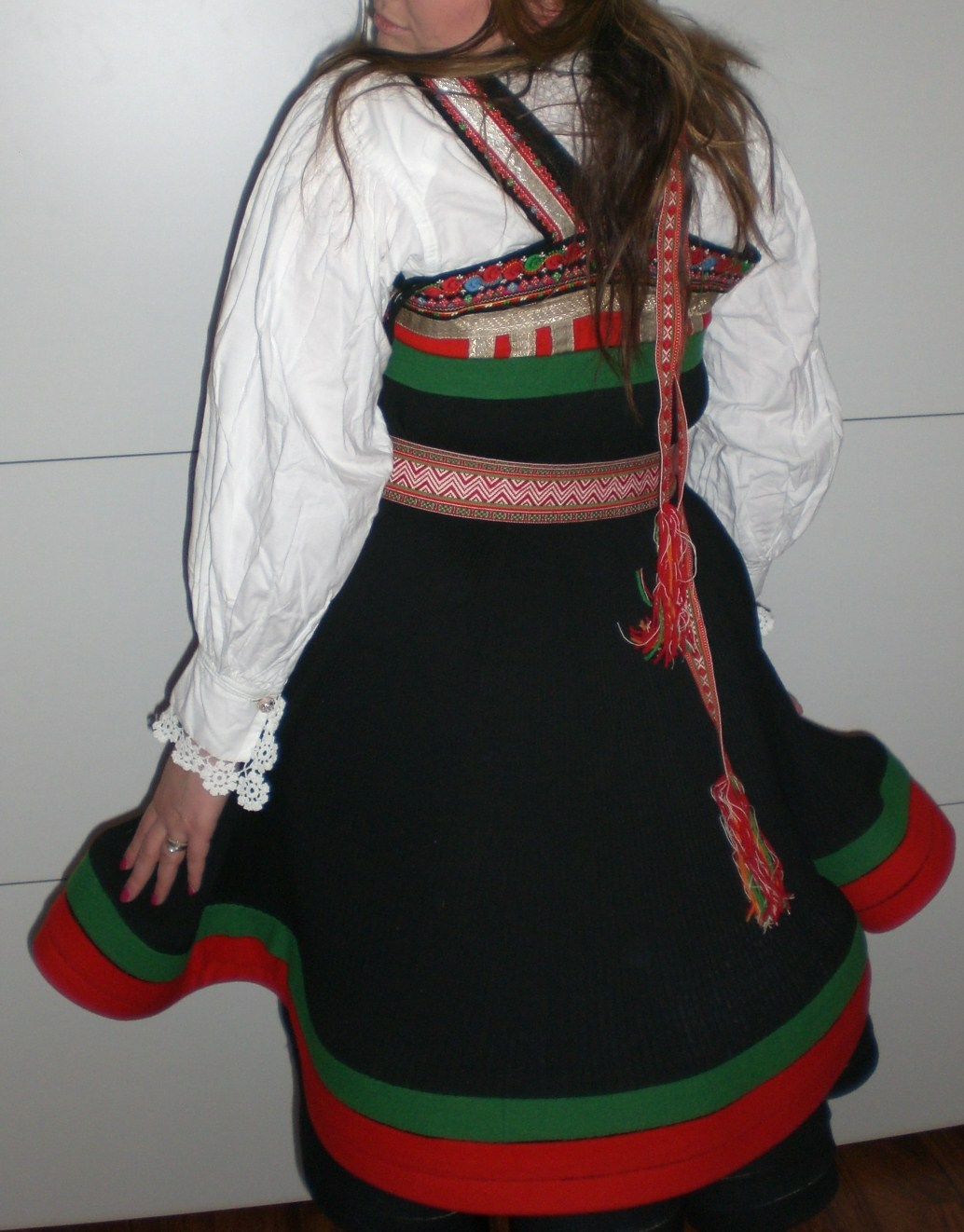
Setesdalsbunad for women. The back of the costume.

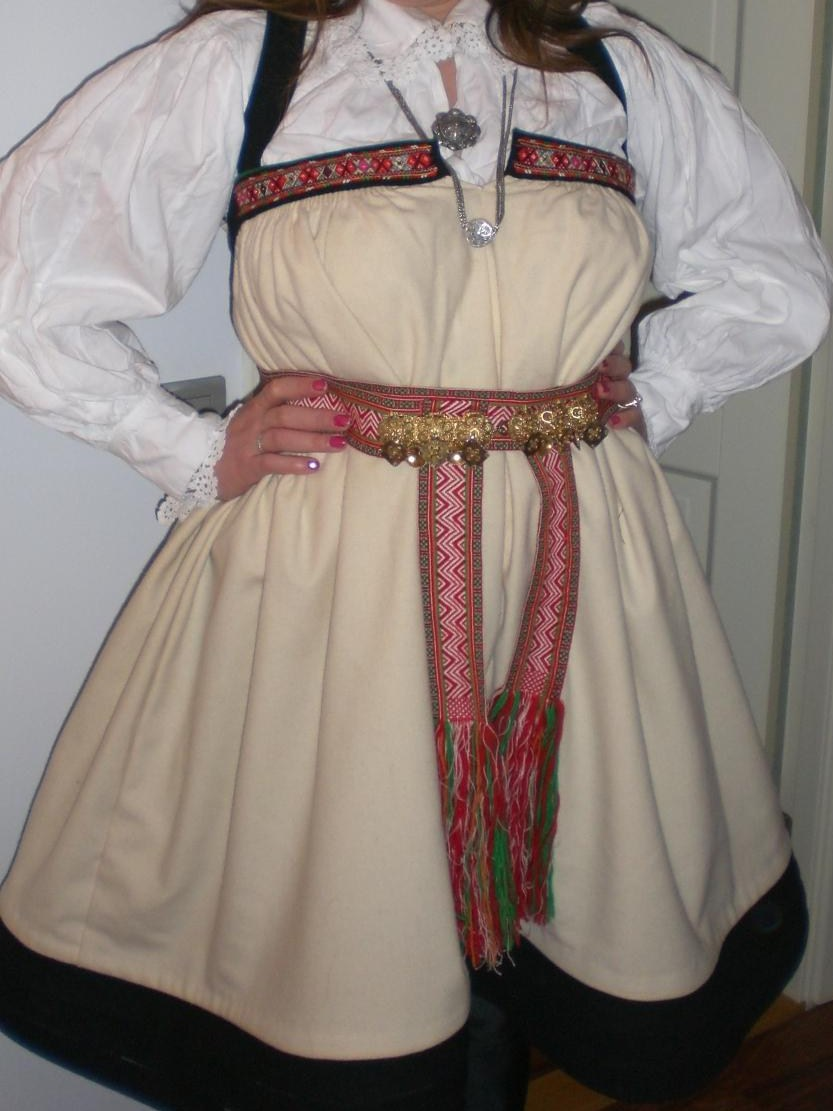
Setesdalsbunad for women, for summer use or everyday use.

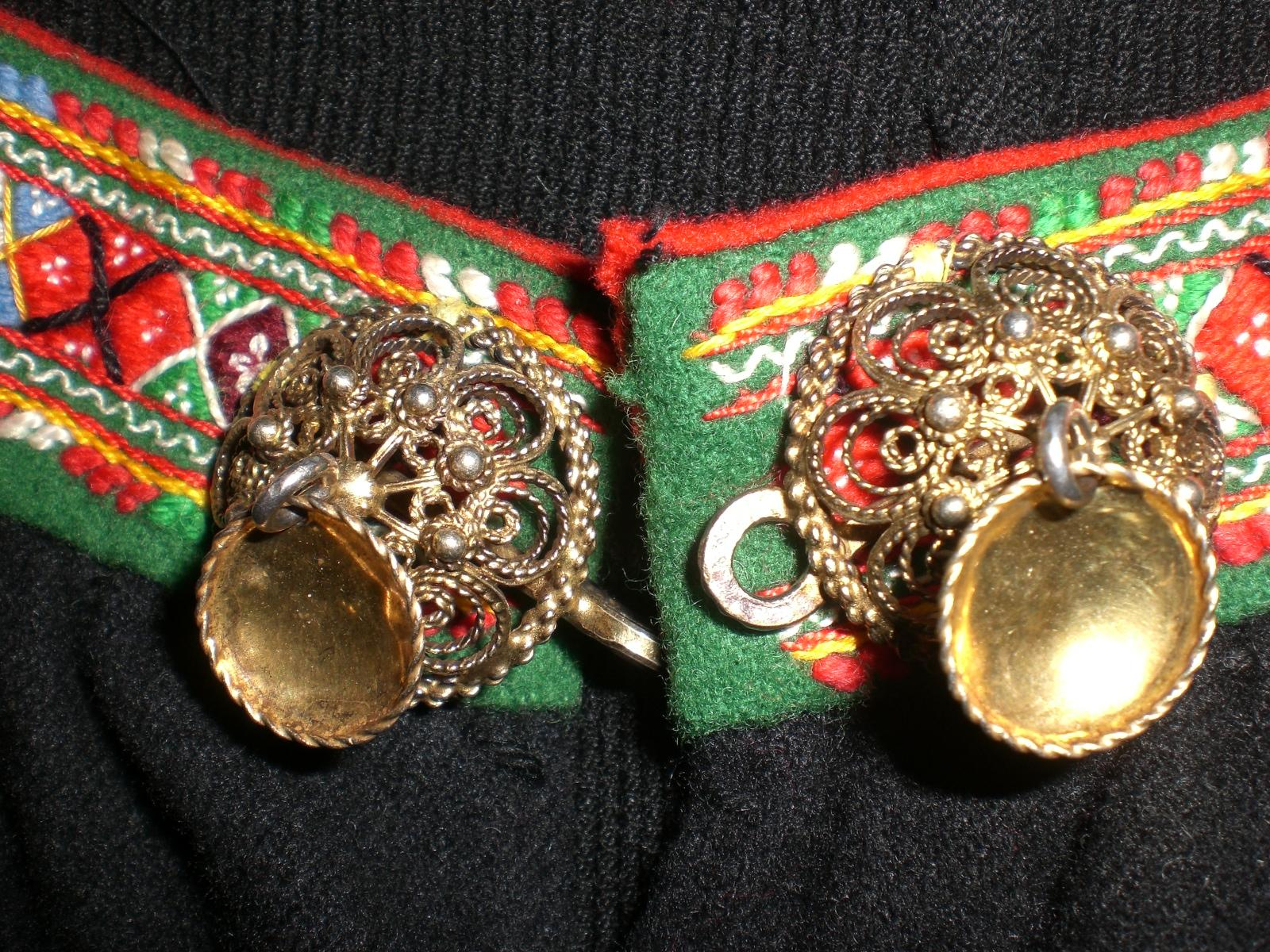
Setesdalsbunad, the leftmost. Detail of the costume.

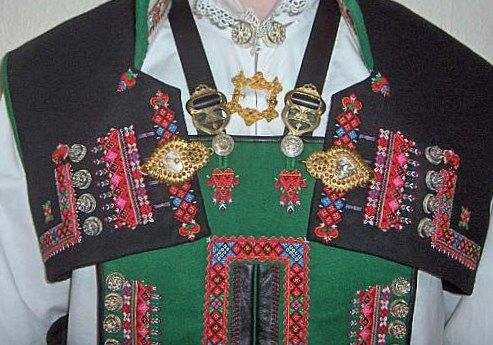
Setesdalsbunad for men. Detail (1).

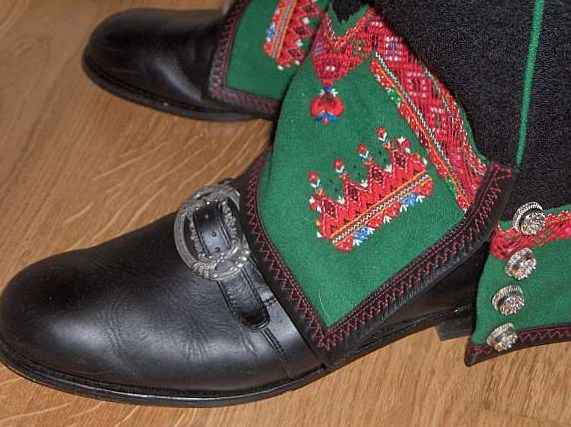
Setesdalsbunad for men. Detail (2).

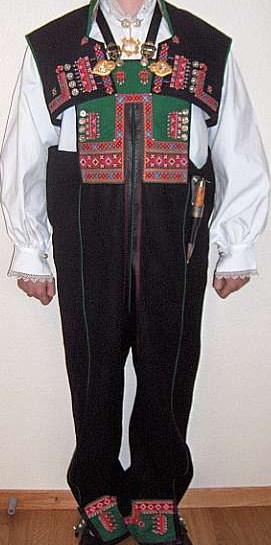
The front of the costume for men.

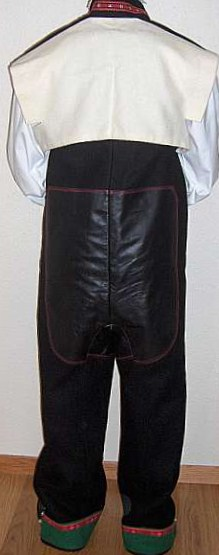
The back of the costume for men.

== See also ==
- Bunad
- List of national costumes of Norway
