= Hardangerbunad =

Traditional dress from Hardanger, Norway

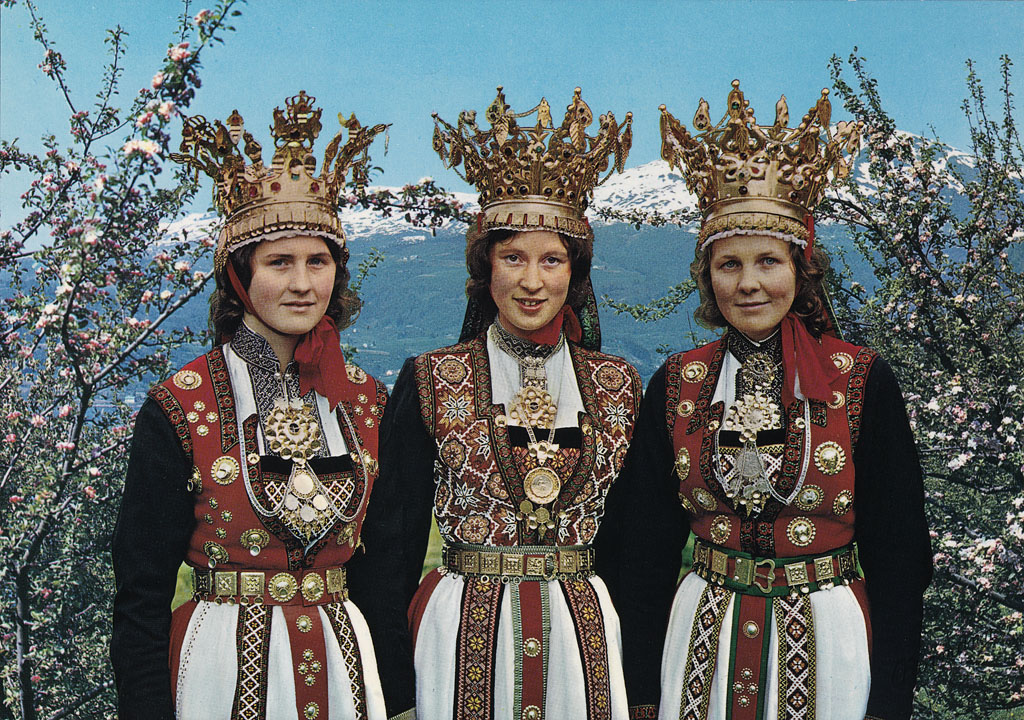
Women in Hardangerbunad bridal costumes

Hardangerbunad is a collective term for bunads from the villages in the traditional district of Hardanger in Vestland county, Norway, with various local varieties. The bunad comes from the following areas: Kvam, Granvin (part of Voss Municipality), Ulvik, Eidfjord, and Ullensvang.

Hardanger is one of the areas in Norway that has had a strong folk costume tradition, and with the national romantic in the late 1800s, the church clothes from this area were lifted to be a Norwegian national symbol, and the Hardangerbunad therefore has the nickname Nasjonalen, in English "The National". The Hardangerbunad was used by women from all over Norway to show support for dissolution of the union between Norway and Sweden in 1905.

== Female bunads ==
The bunads for women have black skirt, and are found in party variants with red or green bodice and white apron, or black bodice and black apron. Over large parts of the bunad, including the belt and apron, there is embroidery in the local style. The embroidery technique is known in Norway as Hardangersøm. The bunads are made of different fabrics. The colored aprons are, for example, in cotton, wool, linen or silk, with patterns depending on local tradition. The headgear has traditionally varied according to marital status.

For the wedding party, the bride traditionally has a bridal crown in addition to the bunad. However, this is something not everyone can afford, so the bridal crown also showed economic status and prosperity.

== Male bunads ==
The male bunads are, to a lesser extent than the women's bunads, part of an unbroken costume tradition, and are thus based on the clothing style in the mid-1800s. The bunad has either black breeches or long pants, black jacket, and red, green, blue or black vest. As for the female bunad, there are embroideries in the traditional, local style.

== Gallery ==
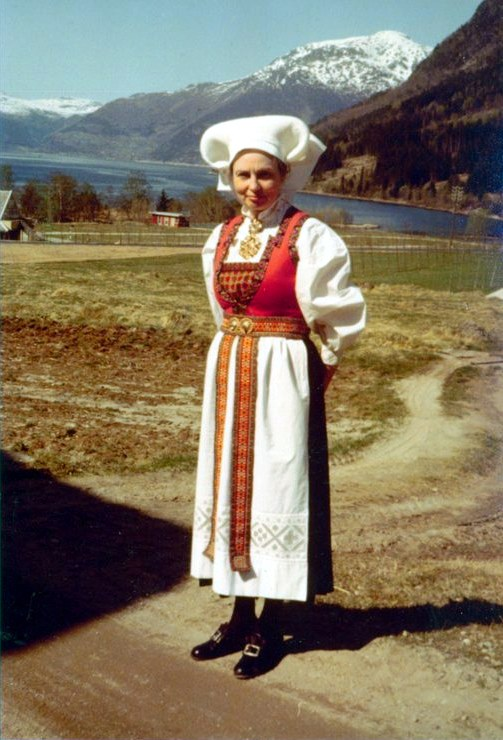
Woman in bunad from Kinsarvik

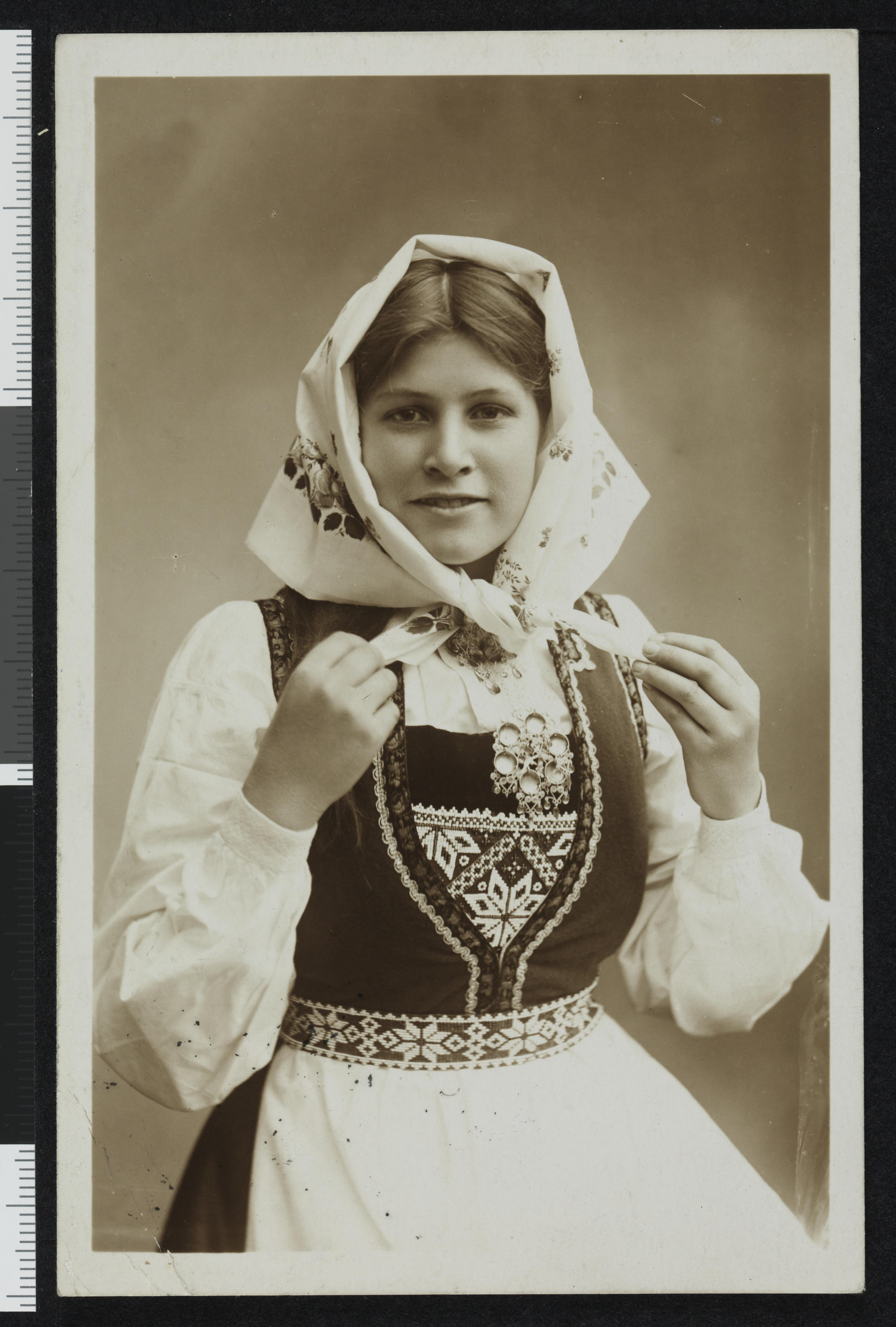
Woman in Hardangerbunad

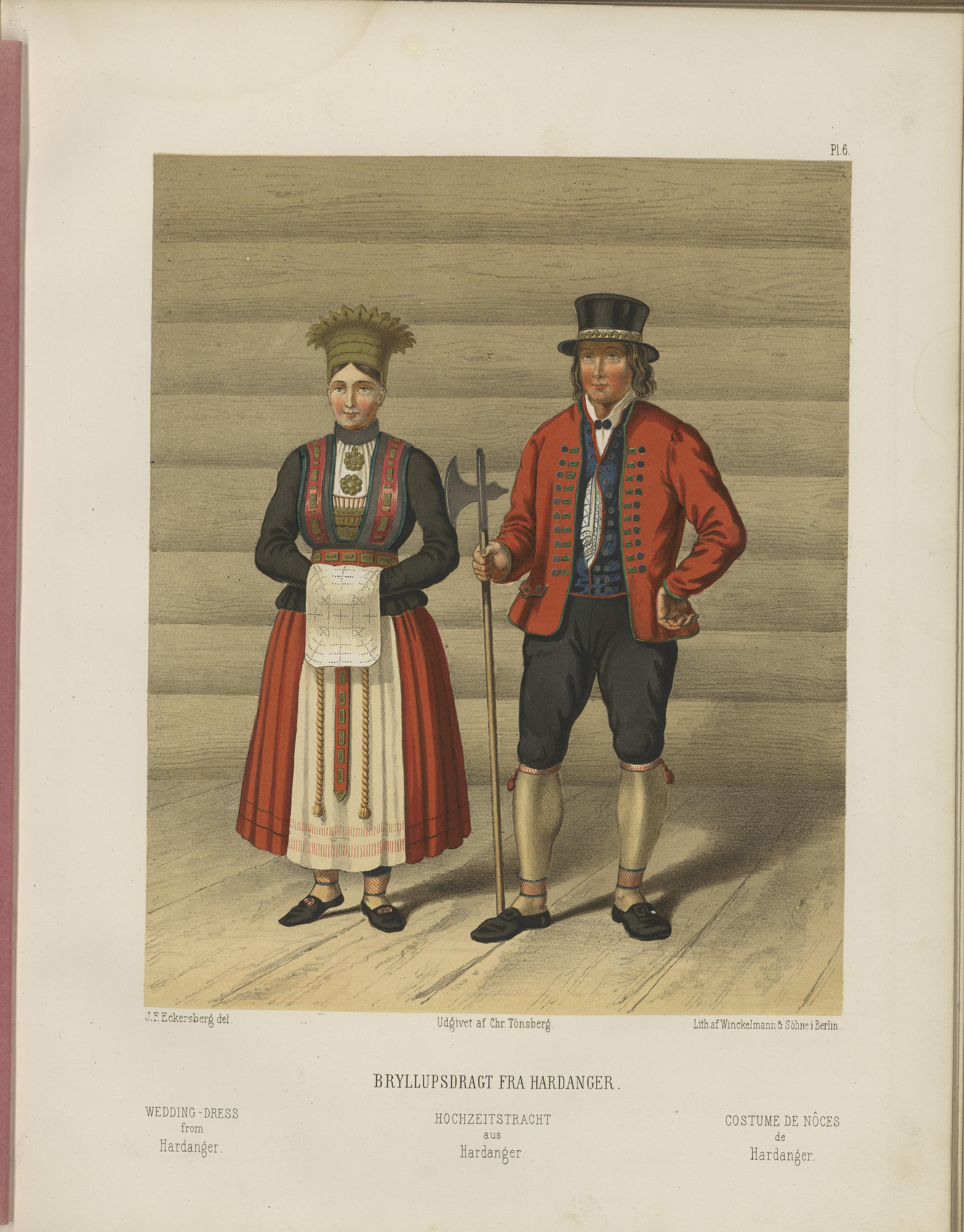
Wedding couple from Hardanger
