= Blockade of Germany (1939–1945) =

WWII operation to restrict supply lines

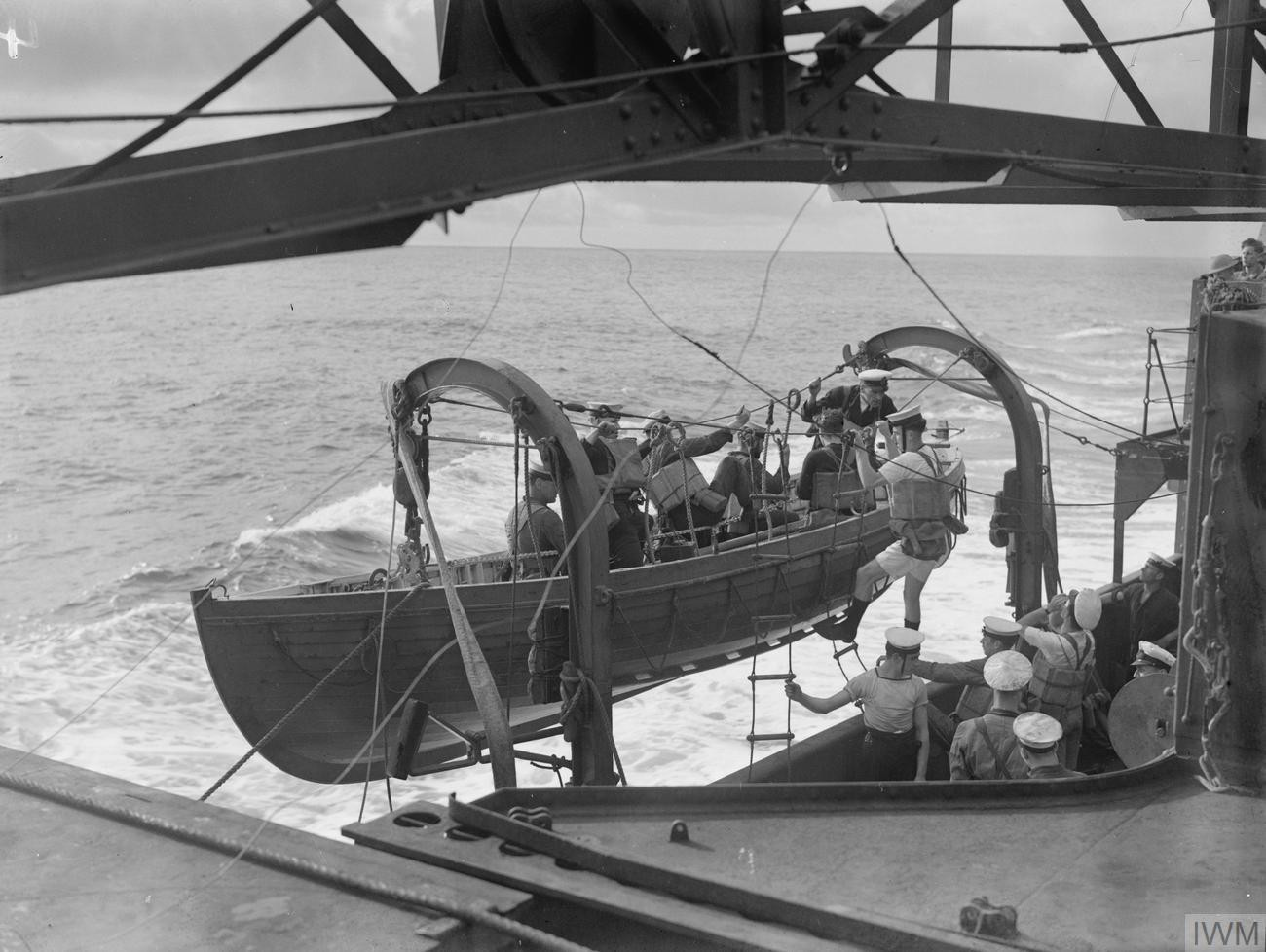
The whaler on HMS Sheffield being manned with an armed boarding party to check a neutral vessel stopped at sea, 20 Oct 1941

The 1939 to 1945 blockade of Germany, part of the economic war of those years, involved operations carried out during World War II by the Allies of World War II in order to restrict the supplies of minerals (including fuel and metals), food and textiles needed by Nazi Germany – and later by other European Axis countries – in order to sustain the Axis war effort. The economic measures consisted mainly of a naval blockade, which formed part of the wider Battle of the Atlantic, but also included the bombing of economically important targets and the preclusive buying of war materials from neutral countries in order to prevent their sale to the Axis powers.

- The first period, from the beginning of European hostilities in September 1939 to the end of the "Phoney War", saw both the Allies and the Axis powers intercepting neutral merchant ships to seize deliveries en route to their respective enemies. Naval blockade at this time proved less than effective because the Axis could get crucial materials overland from the Soviet Union (until June 1941), while Berlin used harbours in Spain to import war materials into Germany.
- The second period began after the rapid Axis occupation of the majority of the European landmass (Scandinavia, Benelux, France, the Balkans, and western parts of the Soviet Union) in 1940–1941, resulting in Axis control of major centres of industry and agriculture.
- The third period started in December 1941 after the attack on Pearl Harbor by the Imperial Japanese Navy Air Service. The German declaration of war on the United States on 11 Dsecember 1941 brought the U.S. officially into the European war.
- The final period came after the tide of war finally turned against the Axis after heavy military defeats up to and after D-Day in June 1944, which led to gradual Axis withdrawals from the occupied territories in the face of the overwhelming Allied military offensives.

== Historical background ==
At the beginning of the First World War in 1914, the United Kingdom used its powerful navy and its geographical location to dictate the movement of the world's commercial shipping. Britain dominated the North Sea, the Atlantic Ocean, the Mediterranean Sea and, due to its control of the Suez Canal with France, access into and out of the Indian Ocean for allied ships, while their enemies were forced to go around Africa. The Ministry of Blockade published a comprehensive list of items that neutral commercial ships were not to transport to the Central Powers (Germany, Austria-Hungary, and the Ottoman Empire). Goods on the list included food, weapons, gold and silver, flax, paper, silk, copra, minerals such as iron ore and animal hides used in the manufacture of shoes and boots. Because Britain and France together controlled 15 of the 20 refuelling points along the main shipping routes, they were able to threaten shipping lines who refused to comply, by the withdrawal of their bunker fuel control facilities.

In World War I, neutral ships were subject to being stopped to be searched for contraband. A large force, known as the Dover Patrol patrolled at one end of the North Sea while another, the Tenth Cruiser Squadron waited at the other. The Allies effectively blocked traffic from the Mediterranean Sea at Gibraltar and Suez, and the dreadnought battleships of the Royal Navy's Grand Fleet waited at Scapa Flow to sail out and meet any German offensive threat. Late in the war the United States and Britain deployed a large minefield, known as the Northern Barrage, between the Orkney Islands and the coast of Norway to further restrict German ship movements.

Britain regarded naval blockade as a completely legitimate method of war, having previously deployed the strategy in the early-nineteenth century to prevent Napoleon's fleet from leaving its harbours to attempt an invasion of England – Napoleon had also blockaded Britain. Germany in particular was heavily reliant on a wide range of foreign imports and suffered very badly from the blockade. Its own substantial fleet of modern warships, hemmed into its bases at Kiel and Wilhelmshaven, was mostly forbidden by the leadership from venturing out. Germany carried out its own immensely effective counter-blockade during its war on Allied commerce (German: Handelskrieg — "Commerce War"), its U-boats sinking many Allied merchant-ships. By 1917 this had almost swung the war the way of the Central Powers. But because Britain found an answer in the convoy system, the sustained Allied blockade led to the collapse and eventual defeat of the German armed forces by late 1918.

=== Build-up to World War II ===
In 1933 Adolf Hitler became Chancellor of Germany. Following Germany's remilitarization of the Rhineland (1936), the Anschluss with Austria (1938) and the later occupation of Czechoslovakia (1938 and 1939), many people began to believe that a new "Great War" was coming, and from late 1937 onwards Sir Frederick Leith-Ross, the British government's chief economics advisor, began to urge senior government figures to put thought into a plan to revive the blockade so that the Royal Navy – still the world's most powerful navy – would be ready to begin stopping shipments to Germany immediately once war broke out. Leith-Ross had represented British interests abroad for many years, having embarked on a number of important overseas missions to countries including Italy, Germany, China and Russia, experience which gave him a very useful worldwide political perspective. His plan was to revive the original World War I blockade but to make it more streamlined, making better use of technology and of Britain's vast overseas business and commercial network so that contacts in key trading locations such as New York, Rio de Janeiro, Tokyo, Rome or Buenos Aires could act as a vast information-gathering system. Making use of tip-offs provided by a vast array of individuals such as bankers, merchant buyers, waterfront stevedores and ship operators doing their patriotic duty, the Royal Navy could have priceless advance knowledge of which ships might be carrying contraband long before they reached port.

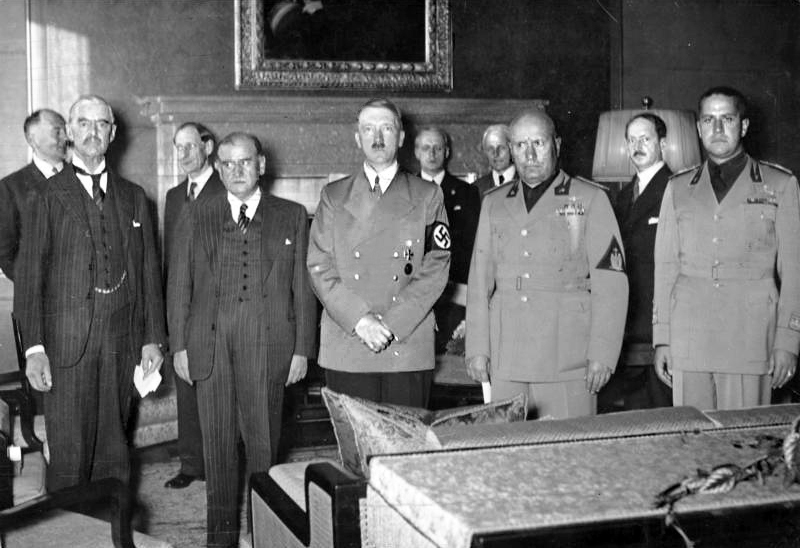
From left to right: Chamberlain, Daladier, Hitler, Mussolini, and Ciano pictured before signing the Munich Agreement, which gave the Sudetenland to Germany.

Initially the British Prime Minister, Neville Chamberlain, was not keen on the idea and still hoped to avoid war, but following his appeasement of Hitler at Munich in September 1938, (widely seen as a stopgap measure to buy time) Chamberlain too began to realise the need for urgent preparations for war. During the last 12 months of peace, Britain and France carried out a vigorous buildup of their armed forces and weapons production. The long-awaited Spitfire fighter began to enter service, the first of the new naval vessels ordered under the 1936 emergency programme began to join the fleet, and the Air Ministry made the final touches to the Chain Home early-warning network of radio direction-finding (later called radar) stations, to bring it up to full operational readiness.

A joint British–French staff paper on strategic policy issued in April 1939 recognised that, in the first phase of any war with Germany, economic warfare was likely to be the Allies' only effective offensive weapon. The Royal Navy war-plans, delivered to the fleet in January 1939, set out three critical elements of a future war at sea. The most fundamental consideration was the defence of trade in home waters and in the Atlantic in order to maintain imports of the goods Britain needed for her own survival. Of secondary importance was the defence of trade in the Mediterranean and the Indian Ocean. If Italy (as assumed) also declared war and became an aggressive opponent, her dominating geographical position might force shipping to go the long way around the Cape of Good Hope (South Africa), but it was hoped to contain her with a strong fleet in the Mediterranean. Finally, there was the need for a vigorous blockade against Germany and Italy.

=== Pre-war situation in Germany ===
In Germany, where as early as 1934 Hitler had warned generals and party leaders that there would eventually be another war, the authorities worried about the effects of a potential new blockade. In order to force Germany to sign the Treaty of Versailles, the original blockade had been extended for an additional nine months after the end of the fighting in October 1918. This course of action, which Hitler called "the greatest breach of faith of all time", caused horrendous suffering among the German people and, according to some authors, led to an estimated half a million deaths from starvation. Germany also lost its entire battle fleet of modern warships at the end of the war and although new ships were being built as fast as was practical – the battleships Bismarck and Tirpitz had been launched but not yet completed – they were in no position to face the British and French navies on anything like equal terms.

The Great Depression in an international perspective. Triangles mark points at which nations suspended gold convertibility and/or devalued their currency against gold.

Greatly deficient in natural resources, Germany's economy traditionally relied on importing raw materials to manufacture goods for re-export, and she developed a reputation for producing high quality merchandise. By 1900 Germany had the biggest economy in Europe and she entered the war in 1914 with plentiful reserves of gold and foreign currency and good credit ratings. By the end of the war, although the UK also lost a quarter of its real wealth, Germany's Industrial production had fallen to 57% of its pre-war value and per capita GDP to 73% of the 1913 level. The Weimar Republic subsequently experienced a number of severe financial problems; first hyperinflation, then – after a brief period of relative prosperity in the mid-1920s – the Great Depression, which hit Germany harder than any country except the United States, and in part led to the rise in political extremism across Europe and Hitler's seizure of power.

Although Hitler was credited with lowering unemployment from 6 million (some sources claim the real figure was as high as 11m) to virtually nil by conscription and by launching enormous public works projects (similar to Roosevelt's New Deal), as with the Autobahn construction he had little interest in economics and Germany's "recovery" was in fact achieved primarily by rearmament and other artificial means conducted by others. Because Germany was nowhere as wealthy in real terms as she had been a generation earlier, with very low reserves of foreign exchange and zero credit, Hjalmar Schacht, and later Walther Funk, as Minister of Economy used a number of financial devices – some very clever – to manipulate the currency and gear the German economy towards Wehrwirtschaft (War Economy). One example was the Mefo bill, a kind of IOU produced by the Reichsbank to pay armaments manufacturers but which was also accepted by German banks. Because Mefo bills did not figure in government budgetary statements, they helped maintain the secret of rearmament and were, in Hitler's own words, merely a way of printing money. Schacht also proved adept at negotiating extremely profitable barter deals with many other nations, supplying German military expertise and equipment in return.

The Nazi official who took the leading role in preparing German industry for war was Hermann Göring. In September 1936 he established the Four Year Plan, the purpose of which was to make Germany self-sufficient and impervious to blockade by 1940. Using his contacts and position, as well as bribes and secret deals he established his own vast industrial empire, the Hermann Göring Works, to make steel from low-grade German iron ore, swallowing up small Ruhr companies and making himself immensely rich in the process. The works were located in the area bounded by Hanover, Halle and Magdeburg, which was considered safe from land offensive operations, and a programme was initiated to relocate existing crucial industries nearest the borders of Silesia, Ruhr and Saxony to the more secure central regions. The great Danube, Elbe, Rhine, Oder, Weser, Main and Neckar rivers were dredged and made fully navigable, and an intricate network of canals was built to interlink them and connect them to major cities.

While the armed forces were being built up, imports were reduced to the barest minimum required, severe price and wage controls were introduced, unions outlawed and, aware that certain commodities would be difficult to obtain once the blockade began, deals were made with Sweden, Romania, Turkey, Spain, Finland and Yugoslavia to facilitate the stockpiling of vital materials such as tungsten, oil, nickel, wool and cotton that would be needed to supply the armed forces in wartime. Heavy investment was made in ersatz ("substitute" or "replacement") industries to produce goods from natural resources Germany did have, such as textiles made from cellulose, rubber and oil made from coal, sugar and ethyl alcohol from wood, and materials for the print industry produced from potato tops. There were also ersatz foodstuffs such as coffee made from chicory and beer from sugar beet. Germany also invested in foreign industries and agricultural schemes aimed at directly meeting their particular needs, such as a plan to grow more soya beans and sunflower instead of maize in Romania.

The American journalist William L. Shirer, who had lived in Berlin since 1934 and who made regular radio broadcasts to the US for CBS, noted that there were all kinds of shortages even before the war began. Germany produced 85% of its own food and UK 91%. Still, even after rationing, food portions were insufficient even for hard labour workers. On 24 August 1939, a week before the invasion of Poland which started the war, Germany announced rationing of food, coal, textiles and soap, and Shirer noted that it was this action above all which made the German people wake up to the reality that war was imminent. They were allowed one bar of soap per month, and men had to make one tube of shaving foam last five months. Housewives soon spent hours standing in line for supplies; shopkeepers sometimes opened otherwise non-perishable goods such as tinned sardines in front of customers when they were bought to prevent hoarding. The clothing allowance was so meagre that for all practical purposes people had to make do with whatever clothing they already possessed until the war was over. Men were allowed one overcoat and two suits, four shirts and six pairs of socks, and had to prove that the old ones were worn out to get new. Some items shown on the coupons, such as bed sheets, blankets and table linen could in reality only be obtained on production of a special licence.

Although Nazi leaders consistently labelled the Allied strategy of blockade as illegal, they nevertheless prepared to counter it by all means necessary. In an ominous foreshadowing of the unrestricted submarine warfare to come, the Kriegsmarine (navy) sent out battle instructions in May 1939 which included the ominous phrase "fighting methods will never fail to be employed merely because some international regulations are opposed to them".

== First phase, September 1939 to May 1940 ==
Germany invaded Poland on 1 September 1939, and Britain and France declared war two days later. Within hours U-30 torpedoed the British liner Athenia off the Hebrides with the loss of 112 lives, leading the Royal Navy to assume that unrestricted U-boat warfare had begun.

Although France, unlike Britain, was largely self-sufficient in food and needed to import few foodstuffs, she still required extensive overseas imports of weapons and raw materials for her war effort, and the two west European allies co-operated closely. As in World War I, a combined War Council formed to agree strategy and policy, and just as the British Expeditionary Force, which was quickly mobilised and sent to France, came under overall French authority, so various components of the French Navy were placed under Admiralty control.

Many in Britain believed that the bombing of big cities and massive civilian casualties would commence immediately after the declaration of war. In 1932 the MP Stanley Baldwin had made a famous speech in which he said that "the bomber will always get through". This message sank deeply into the nation's subconscious, but when air attacks did not come immediately, hundreds of thousands of evacuees gradually began to make their way home over the next few months.

In April 1939 the British Admiralty had again selected Scapa Flow as the main British naval base because of its great distance from German airfields, however the defences built up during World War I had fallen into disrepair. During an early visit to the base, Churchill was unimpressed with the levels of protection against air and submarine attack, and was astounded to see the flagship HMS Nelson putting to sea with no destroyer escort because there were no destroyers to spare. Efforts began to repair the peacetime neglect, but too late to prevent a German U-Boat from creeping into the Flow during the night of 14 October 1939 and sinking the veteran battleship Royal Oak with over 800 fatalities.

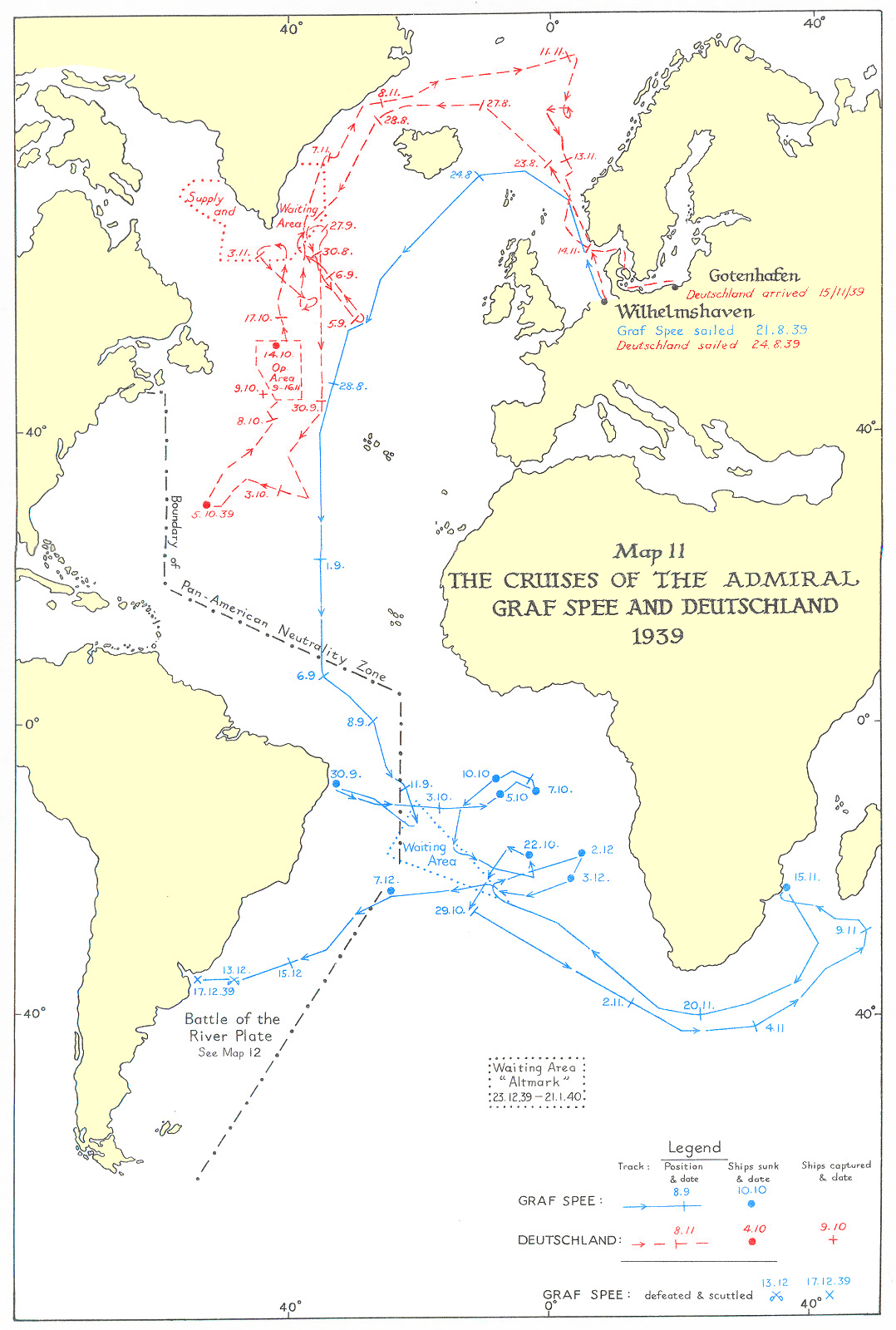
1939 cruises Admiral Graf Spee Deutschland

Although U-boats posed the main German naval threat, there was also the threat posed by surface raiders to consider; the three "pocket battleships" which the Versailles Treaty had allowed Germany had been designed and built specifically with attacks on ocean commerce in mind. Their strong armour, 11 inch guns and 26-knot (48 km/h) speed enabled them to out-match any British cruiser, and two of the three, the Admiral Graf Spee and the Deutschland had left German waters between 21 and 24 August, evaded the Northern Patrol (the Royal Navy squadron that patrolled between Scotland and Iceland) and were now loose on the high seas. The Deutschland cruised off Greenland, waiting for merchant vessels to attack, while the Graf Spee rapidly travelled south across the equator and soon began sinking British merchant-ships in the southern Atlantic. Because the German Kriegsmarine had insufficient capital ships to mount a traditional line of battle, the British and French were able to disperse their own fleets to form hunting groups to track down and sink German commerce-raiders, but the hunt for the two raiders tied down no less than 23 important ships along with auxiliary craft and additional heavy ships to protect convoys.

At the start of the war a large proportion of the German merchant fleet was at sea, and around 30% of its vessels sought shelter in neutral harbours immune to attack, such as in Spain, Mexico, South America, the United States, Portuguese East Africa and Japan. 28 German bauxite ships were holed up in Trieste, and while a few passenger liners, such as the New York, St Louis and Bremen managed to creep home, many vessels ended up stranded with goods deteriorating or rotting in their holds and with Allied ships waiting to capture or sink them immediately if they tried to leave port. The Germans tried various ways of avoiding the loss of the ships, such as disguising them as neutral vessels or selling the ships to foreign flags, but international law did not allow such transactions in wartime. Up to Christmas 1939, crews scuttled at least 19 German merchant ships to prevent their capture by the Allies. In an early success for the Royal Navy, the pocket battleship Graf Spee herself was scuttled outside Montevideo, Uruguay (where she had sought repairs to damage sustained during the December 1939 Battle of the River Plate), after the British spread false rumours of the arrival of a vast naval force tasked to sink her.

=== Contraband control ===
The day after Britain's declaration of war, the British Admiralty announced that all merchant vessels were now liable to examination by the naval Contraband Control Service and by the French Blockade Ministry, which put its ships under British command. Because of the terrible suffering and starvation caused by the use of the blockade strategy during World War I, the British deliberately made no formal declaration of blockade, but their communiqué listed the types of contraband of war deemed liable for confiscation if found. The list included all kinds of foodstuffs, animal feed, forage, and clothing, and articles and materials used in their production — designated as "Conditional Contraband of War". In addition, "Absolute Contraband" constituted:

- all ammunition, explosives, chemicals or appliances suitable for use in chemical warfare
- fuel of all kinds and all contrivances for means of transportation on land, in water or the air
- all means of communication, tools, implements and instruments necessary for carrying on hostile operations
- coin, bullion, currency and evidences of debt

The Royal Navy selected three locations on British home soil for Contraband Control: Weymouth and The Downs in the south to cover the English Channel approaches, and Kirkwall in Orkney to cover the North Sea. Ships on government charter or sailing directly to Allied ports to unload cargo or passengers would not be detained any longer than was necessary to determine their identity, but if on other routes they were to stop at the designated contraband-control ports for detailed examination. Ships proceeding eastward through the English Channel with the intention of passing the Downs, if not calling at any other Channel port, should call at Weymouth for contraband-control examination. Ships bound for European ports and passing to the north of Scotland should call at Kirkwall.

The British established three further contraband-inspection facilities: at Gibraltar (to control access into and out of the western Mediterranean), at Haifa (at the other end of the Mediterranean in the north of British-controlled Mandatory Palestin) and at Aden (in the British [[Aden Colony[]] on the Indian Ocean coast of present-day Yemen at the southern entrance to the Red Sea to control access into the Mediterranean via the Suez Canal). To patrol the Mediterranean and the Red Sea access to the Indian Ocean, Britain would work together with the French, whose own navy was the world's fourth-largest, and comprised a good number of modern, powerful vessels with others nearing completion. Britain and France agreed that the French would hold the Western Mediterranean Basin (via Marseille and the French naval base at Mers El Kébir (Oran) on the coast of Algeria), while the British would hold the Eastern Basin (via its base at Alexandria). The Allies had practical control over the Suez Canal, which provided passage between the eastern Mediterranean and the Indian Ocean, via Port Said at the northern entry to the canal. The canal, built largely by French capital, at that time came under British jurisdiction as a result of the Anglo-Egyptian treaty of 1936.

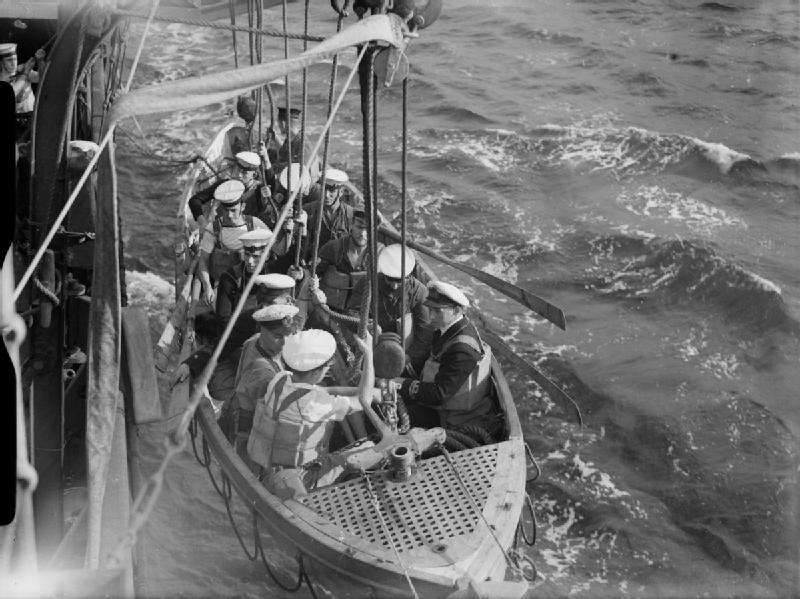
Contraband control at sea. The whaler from HMS Sheffield, with a boarding party of twelve men armed with revolvers, is lowered prior to inspecting a merchant ship. The party would check the intercepted ship's papers and navigation certificate to ensure that it was not engaged in supplying the enemy.

The work of the actual inspection of cargoes was carried out by customs officers and Royal Naval officers and men who, together with their ships, were assigned to Contraband Control for various periods of duty. The job of Control Officer required great tact in the face of irate and defiant neutral captains, particularly Dutch and Scandinavian skippers, who had long traditions of trade with Germany. Contraband Control patrols dotted all practical sea-routes, stopping all neutral ships, and harassing any who tried to slip by, forcing them into ports and laying them up for days before inspection, which in some cases led to the ruining of perishable goods. Control ports were often very overcrowded, with teleprinters constantly sending out cargo listings and manifests for checking against import-quota lists. Even for innocent ships, delays of a day or two became inevitable; Contraband Control officers were under instructions to be extremely polite and apologetic to all concerned. Neutral captains often expressed utter astonishment and bemusement at the level of British advance knowledge of their activities, and soon realised the difficulty of hiding anything. Although shippers made numerous attempts to bypass the blockade, the net was extremely hard to avoid, and most neutral captains voluntarily stopped at one of the eight Allied Contraband Control ports.

=== Ministry of Economic Warfare ===
The job of co-ordinating the various agencies involved in the blockade was carried out by the Ministry of Economic Warfare (MEW), which in the last few weeks before the outbreak of war had been set up by Frederick Leith-Ross. Leith-Ross had not been put off by Chamberlain's initially lukewarm reception to his plan to revive the blockade, but had in fact spent the time after Munich to continue his preparations regardless. Leith-Ross recruited shrewd bankers, statisticians, economists and experts in international law and an army of over 400 administrative workers and civil servants for his new ministry. It was their job to compile and sift through the raw intelligence being received from the various overseas and other contacts, to cross-reference it with the known data on ship movements and cargoes and to pass on any relevant information to Contraband Control. They also put together the Statutory List – sometimes known as the "blacklist" – of companies known to regularly trade with, or who were directly financed by, Germany. In mid-September the Ministry published a list of 278 pro-German persons and companies throughout the world with whom British merchants and shipowners were forbidden to do business, subject to heavy penalties. When shipments from these companies were detected they were usually made a priority for interception.

One lesson that was learnt from World War I was that although the navy could stop ships on the open seas, little could be done about traders who acted as the middleman, importing materials the Nazis needed into their own neutral country then transporting it overland to Germany for a profit. Leith–Ross spent the months before the war compiling a massive dossier on the annual quantities of materials the countries bordering Germany normally imported so that if they exceeded these levels in wartime, pressure could be brought on the authorities in those countries to take action. Diplomats from the Scandinavian nations, as well as Italy and the Balkan countries, who were also major suppliers to Germany, were given quota lists of various commodities and told they could import these amounts and no more, or action would be taken against them.

A ship stopping at a Control port raised a red and white flag with a blue border to signify that it was awaiting examination. At night the port authorities used signal lights to warn a skipper he must halt, and the flag had to stay raised until the ship was passed. Arrangements for boarding and examining ships were made in the port "Boarding Room", and eventually a team of 2 officers and 6 men set out in a fishing drifter or motor launch to the ship. After apologising to the captain for the trouble, they inspected the ship's papers, manifest and bills of lading. At the same time the wireless cabin was sealed so no signals could be sent out while the ship was in the controlled zone. After satisfying themselves that the cargo corresponded with the written records, the party returned ashore and a summary of the manifest, passengers, ports of origin and destination was sent by teleprinter to the Ministry. When the ministry's consent was received, the ship's papers were returned to the captain along with a certificate of naval clearance and a number of special flags – one for each day – signifying that they had already been checked and could pass other patrols and ports without being stopped. If the Ministry found something suspicious, the team returned to examine the load. If part or all the cargo was found suspect the ship was directed to a more convenient port where the cargo was made a ward of the Prize Court by the Admiralty Marshall who held it until the Court sat to decide the outcome, which could include returning it to the captain or confirming its confiscation to be sold at a later time and the proceeds placed into a prize fund for distribution among the fleet after the war. A disgruntled captain could dispute the seizure as illegal, but the list of banned goods was intentionally made broad to include "any goods capable of being used for or converted to the manufacture of war materials".

In the first four weeks of the war, official figures stated that the Royal Navy confiscated 289,000 tons of contraband and the French Marine Nationale 100,000 tons. The Germans responded with their own counter-blockade of supplies destined for Allied ports and published a contraband list virtually identical to the British list. All neutral traffic from the Baltic Sea was to pass through the Kiel Canal for inspection, but with a fraction of the naval forces of their enemies, the action was more in defiance, but it was destined to have a big impact on neutral Scandinavian shipping, who among other materials supplied Britain with large quantities of wood pulp for explosive cellulose and newsprint. Germany began by targeting the Norwegian, Swedish and Finnish pulp boats, sinking several before Sweden shut down its pulp industry and threatened to stop sending Germany iron ore unless the attacks ceased. Germany then began seizing Danish ships carrying butter, eggs and bacon to Britain, in breach of a promise to allow Denmark to trade freely with her enemies.

Up to 21 September 1939 over 300 British and 1,225 neutral ships had been detained, with 66 of them having cargo confiscated. In many cases these cargoes proved useful for the Allies' own war effort – Contraband Control also intercepted a consignment of 2 tons of coffee destined for Germany, where the population had long been reduced to drinking substitutes not made from coffee beans at all. When the manifest of the Danish ship Danmark, operated by the Halal Shipping Company Ltd, was inspected, the recipient was listed as none other than "Herr Hitler, President Republique Grand Allemagne". From the beginning of the war to the beginning of October the daily average number of neutral ships stopping voluntarily at Weymouth was 20, out of which 74, carrying 513,000 tons, were examined; 90,300 tons of contraband iron ore, wheat, fuel oil, petrol and manganese were seized. Even more was done at the other two contraband stations at Orkney and Kent.

=== Shipping shortage ===
At the beginning of the war, Germany possessed 60 U-boats, but was building new vessels quickly and would have over 140 by the summer of 1940. While Britain could call on impressive flotillas of battleships and cruisers for direct ship to ship confrontations, these heavy vessels were of limited use against U Boats. Britain now retained less than half the total of 339 destroyers she had at the height of the battle in 1917 when the U-boats almost forced Britain to consider surrender.

Orders were immediately placed for 58 of a new type of small escort vessel called the corvette which could be built in 12 months or less. Motor launches of new Admiralty design were brought into service for coastal work, and later, a larger improved version of the corvette, the frigate was laid down. To free up destroyers for oceangoing and actual combat operations, merchant ships were converted and armed for escort work, while French ships were also fitted with ASDIC sets which enabled them to detect the presence of a submerged U Boat.

The massive expansion of ship building stretched British shipbuilding capacity – including its Canadian yards – to the limit. The building or completion of ships that would not be finished until after 1940 was scaled back or suspended in favour or ships that could be completed quickly, while the commissioning into the fleet of a series of four new aircraft carriers of the Illustrious class, ordered under an emergency review in 1936 and which were all finished or near completion, was delayed until later in the war in favour of more immediately useful vessels. Great efforts went into finishing the new battleships King George V and Prince of Wales before the Bismarck could be completed and begin attacking Allied convoys, while the French also strained to complete similarly advanced battleships, the Richelieu and the Jean Bart by the autumn of 1940 to meet the Mediterranean threat of two Italian battleships nearing completion.

To bridge the gap during the first crucial weeks while the auxiliary anti-submarine craft were prepared, aircraft carriers were used to escort the numerous unprotected craft approaching British shores. However this strategy proved costly; the new carrier Ark Royal was attacked by a U-boat on 14 September, and while it escaped, the old carrier Courageous was not so lucky, being sunk a few days later with heavy loss of life. Ships leaving port could be provided with a limited protective screen from aircraft flying from land bases, but at this stage of the conflict, a 'Mid-Atlantic Gap', where convoys could not be provided with air cover existed. Churchill lamented the loss of Berehaven and the other Southern Irish ports, greatly reducing the operational radius of the escorts, due to the determination of the Irish leader Éamon de Valera to remain resolutely neutral in the conflict.

In the first week of the war, Britain lost 65,000 tons of shipping; in the second week, 46,000 tons were lost, and in the third week 21,000 tons. By the end of September 1939, regular ocean convoys were in operation, outward from the Thames and Liverpool, and inwards from Gibraltar, Freetown and Halifax. To make up the losses of merchant vessels and to allow for increased imports of war goods, negotiations began with neutral countries such as Norway and the Netherlands towards taking over their freighters on central government charter.

=== Navicert ===
Elsewhere, the blockade began to do its work. From Norway, across and down the North Sea, in the Channel and throughout the Mediterranean and Red Sea, Allied sea and air power began slowly to bleed away Germany's supplies. In the first 7 days of October alone, the British Contraband Control detained, either by confiscating neutral cargoes or capturing German ships, 13,800 tons of petrol, 2,500 tons of sulphur, 1,500 tons of jute (the raw material from which hessian and burlap cloth is made), 400 tons of textiles, 1,500 tons animal feed, 1,300 tons oils and fats, 1,200 tons of foodstuffs, 600 tons oilseeds, 570 tons copper, 430 tons of other ores and metals, 500 tons of phosphates, 320 tons of timber and various other quantities of chemicals, cotton, wool, hides and skins, rubber, silk, gums and resins, tanning material and ore crushing machinery.

Two months into the war, the Ministry reintroduced the "Navicert" (Navigational Certificate), first used to great effect during World War I. This system was in essence a commercial passport applied to goods before they were shipped, and was used on a wide scale. Possession of a Navicert proved that a consignment had already been passed as non-contraband by His Majesty's Ambassador in the country of origin and allowed the captain to pass Contraband Control patrols and ports without being stopped, sparing the navy and the Ministry the trouble of tracking the shipment. Violators, however, could expect harsh treatment. They could be threatened with Bunker Control measures, refused further certification or have their cargo or their vessel impounded. Conversely, neutrals who went out of their way to co-operate with the measures could expect "favoured nation" status, and have their ships given priority for approval. Italy, though an ally of Hitler, had not yet joined the war, and its captains enjoyed much faster turnarounds by following the Navicert system than the Americans, who largely refused to accept its legitimacy.

=== U.S. reaction to the British blockade ===
Passenger ships were also subject to Contraband Control because they carried luggage and small cargo items such as postal mail and parcels, and the Americans were particularly furious at the British insistence on opening all mail destined for Germany. By 25 November 1939, 62 U.S. ships of various types had been stopped, some for as long as three weeks, and a lot of behind-the-scenes diplomacy took place to smooth over the political fallout. On 22 December the US State Department made a formal protest, to no avail. On 30 December the Manhattan, carrying 400 tons of small cargo, sailed from New York to deliver mail to Italy, but was stopped six days later by a British destroyer at Gibraltar. Although the captain went ashore to make a furious protest to the authorities with the American Consulate, the ship was delayed for 40 hours as British Contraband Control checked the records and ship's manifest, eventually removing 235 bags of mail addressed to Germany.

In the U.S., with its tradition that "the mail must always get through", and where armed robbery of the mail carried a mandatory 25-year jail term, there were calls for mail to be carried on warships, but the exercise – as with all such journeys – was repeated on the homeward leg as Contraband Control searched the ship again for anything of value that might have been taken out of Germany. On 22 January the UK ambassador was handed a note from the State Department calling the practice "wholly unwarrantable" and demanding immediate correction. But despite the British Foreign Office urging the Ministry of Economic Warfare to be cautious for fear of damaging relations with the US, the British claimed to have uncovered a nationwide US conspiracy to send clothing, jewels, securities, cash, foodstuffs, chocolate, coffee and soap to Germany through the post, and there was no climbdown.

=== Gruss und Kuss ===
From the war's beginning, a steady stream of packages, many marked Gruss und Kuss ("greetings and kisses!") had been sent from the United States through neutral countries to Germany by a number of US-based organisations, euphemistically termed "travel agencies", advertising special combinations of gift packages in German-language newspapers. Despite high prices, one mail company, the Fortra Corporation of Manhattan admitted it had sent 30,000 food packages to Germany in less than three months, a business which exceeded US$1 million per year. The British said that, of 25,000 packages examined in three months, 17,000 contained contraband of food items as well as cash in all manner of foreign currency, diamonds, pearls, and maps of "potential military value". When a ton of air mail from the Pan American Airlines (PAA) flying boat American Clipper was confiscated in Bermuda, the American government banned outright the sending of parcels through the US airmail. During this period, the Italian Lati Airline, flying between South America and Europe was also used to smuggle small articles such as diamonds and platinum, in some cases, concealed within the airframe, until the practice was ended by the Brazilian and US governments and the airline's assets in Brazil confiscated after the British intelligence services in the Americas engineered a breakdown in relations between the airline and the Brazilian government. The US travel agencies were eventually closed down along with the German consulates and information centres on 16 June 1941.

=== Phoney war ===
During the early months of the war – the Phoney War – the only place where there was substantial fighting was at sea. News of the successes achieved by the men of Contraband Control were rarely out of the newspapers, and provided useful propaganda to shore up civilian morale. In the first 15 weeks of the war the Allies claimed to have taken 870,000 tons of goods, equal to 10% of Germany's normal imports for an entire year. This included 28 million US gallons (110,000 m^{3}) of petrol and enough animal hides for 5 million pairs of boots, and did not take account of the loss to Germany from goods that had not been shipped at all for fear of seizure.

German preparations to counter the effects of the military and economic war were much more severe than in Britain. On 4 September a tax of 50% was placed on beer and tobacco, and income tax went up to 50%. For months previously, all able-bodied people in cities had by law to carry out war work such as filling sandbags for defenses and air-raid shelters, and it was now made an offense to ask for a raise in salary or to demand extra pay for overtime. On 7 September wide-ranging new powers were granted to Heinrich Himmler to punish the populace for 'Endangering the defensive power of the German people'; the next day a worker was shot for refusing to take part in defensive work. The new legislation, frequently enforced by the Peoples Court, was made deliberately vague to cover a variety of situations, and could be very severe. In time it would lead to the death penalty for such crimes as forging food coupons and protesting against the administration. Shirer recorded in his diary on 15 September that the blockade was already having a direct effect. It had cut Germany off from 50% of her normal imports of nickel, cotton, tin, oil and rubber, and since the war's beginning she had also lost access to French iron ore, making her extremely reliant on Sweden for this vital material.

Germany now looked to Romania for a large part of the oil she needed and to Soviet Union for a wide range of commodities. Apart from allowing Hitler to secure his eastern borders and annihilate Poland, the Nazi-Soviet Pact brought Germany considerable economic benefits in August 1939. As well as providing refueling and repair facilities for German U-boats and other vessels at its remote Arctic port of Teriberka, east of Murmansk, the Soviets – "Belligerent Neutrals" in Churchill's words – also accepted large quantities of wheat, tin, petrol and rubber from America into its ports in the Arctic and Black Sea and, rather than transport them over the entire continent, released identical volumes of the same material to Germany in the west. Before the war total US exports to Soviet Union were estimated as less than £1 million per month; by this stage, they were known to exceed £2 million per month. From the outset, although they had formerly been hated enemies, large-scale direct trade took place between the two countries because both were able to offer something the other wanted. Germany lacked the natural resources Soviet Union had in abundance, whereas Soviet Union was at that time still a relatively backward country in want of the latest technology. However, by the end of December 1939 the Soviets didn't agree to start sending raw materiel since they weren't satisfied by German offers, citing refusal to get some of what they wanted and overly high prices on everyone else, and the actual trade within the framework treaty signed in August only took off in 1940 (see below).

The Germans maintained an aggressive strategy at sea in order to press home their own blockade of the Allies. Lloyd's List showed that by the end of 1939 they had sunk 249 ships by U-boat, air attack, or by mines. These losses included 112 British and 12 French vessels, but also demonstrated the disproportionate rate of loss by neutral nations. Norway, a great seafaring nation since the days of the Vikings had lost almost half its fleet in World War I, yet now possessed a merchant navy of some 2,000 ships, with tonnage exceeded only by Britain, the US, and Japan. They had already lost 23 ships, with many more attacked and dozens of sailors killed, while Sweden, Germany's main provider of iron ore, had lost 19 ships, Denmark 9, and Belgium 3. The Netherlands, with 75% of her commercial shipping outgoing from Rotterdam to Germany, had also lost 7 ships, yet all these countries continued to trade with Germany. Churchill was endlessly frustrated and bemused by the refusal of the neutrals to openly differentiate between the British and German methods of waging the sea war, and by their determination to maintain pre-war patterns of trade, but stopped short of condemning them, believing that events would eventually prove the Allies to be in the right. He commented;

At present their plight is lamentable and will become much worse. They bow humbly in fear of German threats of violence, each one hoping that if he feeds the crocodile enough the crocodile will eat him last and that the storm will pass before their turn comes to be devoured. What would happen if these neutrals, with one spontaneous impulse were to do their duty in accordance with the Covenant of the League [of Nations] and stand together with the British and French Empires against aggression and wrong?.

The neutral commerce which Churchill found most perplexing was the Swedish iron ore trade. Sweden provided Germany with 9m tons of high grade ore per year via its Baltic ports, without which German armaments manufacture would be paralyzed. These ports froze in the winter, but an alternative route was available from the Norwegian port of Narvik from which the ore was transported down a partially hidden sea lane (which Churchill called the Norwegian Corridor) between the shoreline and the Skjaergaard (Skjærgård), a continuous chain of some 50,000 glacially formed skerries (small uninhabited islands), sea stacks and rocks running the entire 1,600 km length of the west coast. As in World War I, the Germans used the Norwegian Corridor to travel inside the 3-nautical-mile (5.6 km)-wide neutral waters where the Royal Navy and RAF were unable to attack them. Churchill considered this to be the "greatest impediment to the blockade", and continually pressed for the mining of the Skjaergaard to force the German ships to come out into the open seas where Contraband Control could deal with them, but the Norwegians, not wishing to antagonise the Germans, steadfastly refused to allow it.

Even so, by early October the Allies were growing increasingly confident at the effectiveness of their blockade and the apparent success of the recently introduced convoy system. A convoy of 15 freighters arrived in British ports unscathed from Canada bringing half a million bushels of wheat, while in France more important ships arrived from Halifax in another convoyed group. The French claimed that of 30 U-boats sent out in Germany's first major offensive against Allied shipping, a third had been destroyed, and Churchill declared that Britain had seized 150,000 more tons of contraband than was lost by torpedoing. In mid-October Adolf Hitler called for fiercer action by his U-boat crews and the Luftwaffe to enforce his counter-blockade, and warned the Allies of his new "secret weapon". Neutral ships were warned against joining Allied convoys, Scandinavian merchants were ordered to use the Kiel Canal to facilitate the German's own Contraband Control and the US City of Flint, which had rescued survivors of the Athenia became the first American ship captured as prize of war by the Germans, although the episode proved farcical and the ship was eventually returned to its owners.

=== Minenkrieg ===
Hitler's "secret weapon" of the time was the magnetic mine. The Germans had used mines against freighters from the beginning, but now began laying a new type, which did not need to make contact with a ship to destroy it, off the English coast, using seaplanes to drop them in British harbours, channels and estuaries too narrow or shallow for submarines to navigate. They ranged from small 200 lb (91 kg) mines dropped dozens at a time to large one-ton versions dropped by parachute on shoal bottoms which were almost impossible to sweep, equipped with magnetic triggers activated by a steel hull passing above. Over the next few days many ships of all sizes blew up in waters close to shore, mostly by explosions under or near the keels although the waters had been swept. Six went down in the mouth of the Thames, and the new cruiser Belfast was badly damaged at the mouth of the Firth of Forth.

The British urgently set to work to find a defence against the magnetic mine and began preparations to recreate the Northern Barrage, established between Scotland and Norway in 1917 as a safeguard against increasing U-boat attacks. In his war speech to the Empire, Prime Minister Neville Chamberlain declared: "Already we know the secret of the magnetic mine and we shall soon master it as we have already mastered the U-boat", but shortly afterwards two more ships were sunk, bringing the week's total to 24. Evidence that at least part of Germany's attack was with illegal floating mines came when a British freighter was sunk at anchor off an east coast port, when two mines came together and exploded off Zeebrugge, and when a large whale was found near four German mines on the Belgian coast with a huge hole in its belly. Over the weekend of 18–21 November six other neutral ships were sunk off the English coast, including a 12,000 ton Japanese liner.

Eventually, a method of de-magnetising ships, known as degaussing was developed, which involved girding them in electric cable, and was quickly applied to all ships. Other means of minesweeping were also developed, whereby the mines were exploded by patrolling ships and aircraft fitted with a special fuse provocation apparatus.

=== Export ban ===
From early December 1939 the British began preventing German exports as a reprisal for the damage and loss of life caused by the German magnetic mines. Chamberlain said that although he realised this would be detrimental to the neutrals, as Norway got nearly all its coal from Germany, the policy was in strict adherence to the rules of law, and that while Germany's use of mines and submarine warfare had already caused many innocent deaths regardless of nationality, no loss of life had been caused by the exercise of British sea power. Before the war, 70% of Germany's export trade was with European countries, mostly the Netherlands, France and England, but the Ministry estimated that Germany's remaining annual exports were worth £44m to South America, £19m to the Far East, £15m to the US, and that although nothing could be done to prevent the overland exports to Scandinavia, Italy, Russia and the Balkans, it was believed that German sea trade could be reduced by 45% by the measure.

Angry at the British export ban, the German Government accused the British of having deliberately sunk the Simon Bolivar, lost on 18 November with the loss of 120 people, including women and children. They advised neutrals to shun British waters and trade with Germany, declaring that because of the defensive minefields and contraband control, British waters were not mercantile fairways subject to the Hague Convention regulating sea warfare, but military areas where enemy ships of war must be attacked. Prompted by Germany, all the neutrals protested, but the overall effect was to slow the flow of neutral shipping to a standstill. The Nazi leadership later grew bullish at the apparent success of the mine strategy and admitted they were of German origin, stating that "our objectives are being achieved".

In Berlin, William Shirer recorded in his diary that there were signs of a rush to convert currency into goods to guard against inflation, but that although the blockade now meant that the German diet was very limited, there was generally enough to eat and people were at that point rarely going hungry. However, it was no longer possible to entertain at home unless the guests brought their own food and though restaurants and cafes still traded they were now very expensive and crowded. Pork, veal and beef were rare, but in the early months there was still adequate venison, wild pig and wildfowl shot on estates and in forests. Coal was now very difficult to obtain however, and although sufficient crayfish were imported from the Danubian nations to allow an enjoyable festive meal, people went cold that Christmas. In fact, Germany produced large volumes of very high quality coal in the Saar region, but much of it was now being used to produce synthetic rubber, oil and gas. There were reports that Germany, which badly needed to raise foreign currency had been trying to export bicycles and cars to adjacent countries without tyres. The average German worker worked for 10 hours a day 6 days a week; but although he may have had enough money to buy them, most items were not available, and shops displayed goods in their windows accompanied by a sign saying 'Not For Sale'

Such was the belief in the supreme strength of the Royal Navy that some thought that the blockade might now be so effective in restricting Germany's ability to fight that Hitler would be forced to come to the negotiation table.

Meanwhile, at the beginning of 1940 there were still 60 German merchant ships alone in South American harbours, costing £300,000 per month in port and harbour dues, and Hitler eventually ordered them all to try to make a break for home. Up to the end of February 1940 about 70 had tried to get away, but very few reached Germany. Most were sunk or scuttled, and at least eight foundered on rocks trying to negotiate the way down the unfamiliar and hazardous Norwegian coast. The Germans tended to prefer to sink the ships themselves rather than allow the Allies to capture them, even at risk to those aboard. Such was the case of the Columbus, Germany's third-largest liner at 32,581 tons, and the Glucksburg, which ran herself ashore on the coast of Spain when sighted. Another, the "Watussi", was sighted off the Cape by the South African Air Force and the crew immediately set her on fire, trusting the aircrew to bring aid to the passengers and crew.

That winter was harsh, causing the Danube to freeze and heavy snow slowed rail transport, stalling Germany's grain and oil imports from Romania. The UK, having deprived Spain of her exports of iron ore to Germany entered into a deal to buy the ore instead via the Bay of Biscay, along with copper, mercury and lead to enable the Spanish, who were on the verge of famine, to raise the foreign exchange she needed to buy grain from South America to feed her people.

=== 1940 ===
On 17 January 1940 the Minister of Economic Warfare, Ronald Cross said in a speech in the House of Commons:

We have made a good start, we must bear in mind that Germany does not have the same resources she had some 25 years ago. Her resources in gold and foreign currency are smaller; her stocks of industrial raw materials are far smaller. At the end of four and a half months, Germany is in something like the same economic stress she was in after two years of the last war.

Despite newsreels showing the effectiveness and power of the Nazi Blitzkrieg, which even her enemies believed, Germany was unable to afford a prolonged war. In order to buy from abroad without credit or foreign exchange (cash), a nation needed goods or gold to offer, but the British export ban prevented her from raising revenue. In World War I, even after two years of war Germany still had gold reserves worth 2.5m marks and over 30 billion marks invested abroad, giving her easy access to exports. By this early stage of World War II, her gold reserves were down to around half a billion marks and her credit was almost nil, so any imports had to be paid for by barter, as with the high-technology equipment sent to Russia or coal to Italy.

In February 1940 Karl Ritter, who had brokered huge pre-war barter agreements with Brazil, visited Moscow and, despite finding Stalin an incredibly fierce negotiator, an increased trade deal was eventually signed between Germany and Russia. It was valued at 640 million Reichsmark in addition to that previously agreed, for which Germany would supply heavy naval guns, specimens of military land vehicles (e. g., a brand new Panzer III Ausf. E tank), thirty of their latest aircraft including the Messerschmitt Bf 109, Messerschmitt Bf 110 and Junkers Ju 88, locomotives, turbines, generators, the unfinished cruiser Lützow and the plans to the battleship Bismarck. In return Russia supplied in the first year one million tons of cereal, 1/2 million tons of wheat, 900,000 tons of oil, 100,000 tons of cotton, 1/2 million tons of phosphates, one million tons of soya beans and other goods. Although the Germans had been able to find numerous ways of beating the blockade, shortages were now so severe that on 30 March 1940, when he was gearing up for his renewed Blitzkrieg in the west, Hitler ordered that delivery of goods in payment to Russia should take priority even over those to his own armed forces. After the fall of France Hitler, intending to invade Russia the following year, declared that the trade need continue only until the spring of 1941, after which the Nazis intended to take all they needed.

As more U-boats were commissioned into the German navy, the terrible toll on neutral merchant shipping intensified. After the first 6 months of the war, Norway had lost 49 ships with 327 men dead; Denmark 19 ships for 225 sailors killed and Sweden 32 ships for 243 men lost. In early March, Admiral Raeder was interviewed by an American correspondent from NBC regarding the alleged use of unrestrained submarine warfare. Raeder maintained that because the British blockade was illegal, the Germans were entitled to respond with "similar methods", and that because the British government had armed many of its merchant ships and used civilians to man coastal patrol vessels and minesweepers, any British ship sighted was considered a legitimate target. Raeder said that neutrals would only be liable to attack if they behaved as belligerents i.e. by zig-zagging or navigating without lights. The paradox with this argument – as the neutral countries were quick to point out – was that Germany was benefiting from the very same maritime activity they were trying so hard to destroy.

On 6 April, after the sinking of the Norwegian mail steamer Mira, the Norwegian Foreign Minister Professor Koht, referring to 21 protests made to belligerents about breaches to her neutrality, made a statement about the German sinking of Norwegian ships by U-boats and aircraft. "We cannot understand how men of the German forces can find such a practice in accordance with their honour or humanitarian feelings". A few hours later another ship, the Navarra was torpedoed without warning, with the loss of 12 Norwegian seamen, by a U-boat which did not stop to pick up survivors.

=== Intensification of the blockade ===
Despite impressive statistics of the quantities of contraband captured, by the spring of 1940 the optimism of the British government over the success of the blockade appeared premature and a feeling developed that Germany was managing to maintain and even increase imports. Although the MEW tried to prevent it, neighbouring neutral countries continued to trade with Germany. In some cases, as with the crucial Swedish iron ore trade, it was done openly, but elsewhere, neutrals secretly acted as a conduit for supplies of materials that would otherwise be confiscated if sent directly to Germany.

A third of Dutchmen derived their livelihood from German trade, and Dutch traders were long suspected of acting as middle men in the supply of copper, tin, oil and industrial diamonds from America. Official figures showed that in the first 5 months of war, the Netherlands' imports of key materials from the US increased by £4.25m, but also Norway's purchases in the same area increased threefold to £3m a year, Sweden's by £5m and Switzerland's by £2m. Prominent in these purchases were cotton, petrol, iron, steel and copper – materials essential for waging war. While some increases may have been inflationary, some from a desire to build up their own armed forces or to stockpile reserves, it was exactly the type of activity the Ministry was trying to prevent.

American companies were prevented from openly supplying arms to belligerents by the Neutrality Acts, (an amendment was made on 21 September in the form of Cash and Carry) but no restrictions applied to raw materials. During the last 4 months of 1939, exports from the US to the 13 states capable of acting as middlemen to Germany amounted to £52m compared to £35m for the same period in 1938. By contrast, Britain and France spent £67m and £60m in the same periods respectively, and according to a writer in the New York World Telegram, exports to the 8 countries bordering Germany exceeded the loss of US exports previously sent directly to Germany.

But by far the biggest hole in the blockade was in the Balkans. Together Yugoslavia, Romania and Bulgaria annually exported to Germany a large part of their surplus oil, chromium, bauxite, pyrites, oil-bearing nuts, maize, wheat, meat and tobacco. Germany also made big purchases in Greece and Turkey and viewed the region as part of its supply hinterland. Before the war, Britain recognised Germany's special interest in the region and took a very small percentage of this market, but now, via the United Kingdom Commercial Corporation they used their financial power to compete in the Balkans, the Netherlands and Scandinavia, underselling and overbidding in markets to deprive Germany of goods, although Germany was so desperate to maintain supplies that they paid considerably over the normal market rate. As elsewhere, Germany paid in kind with military equipment, for which they were greatly aided with their acquisition of the Czech Skoda armaments interests.

Germany was almost entirely dependent on Hungary and Yugoslavia for bauxite, used in the production of Duralumin, a copper alloy of aluminium critical to aircraft production. The British attempted to stop the bauxite trade by sending undercover agents to blast the Iron Gate, the narrow gorge where the Danube cuts through the Carpathian Mountains by sailing a fleet of dynamite barges down the river, but the plan was prevented by Romanian police acting on a tip-off from the pro-German Iron Guard. Despite their declared neutrality, the politically unstable Balkan nations found themselves in an uncomfortable position, surrounded by Germany to the North, Italy to the West and Soviet Union to the East, with little room to refuse German veiled threats that, unless they continued to supply what was requested, they would suffer the same fate as Poland. Romania, which had made considerable territorial gains after World War I, exported a large proportion of the oil from its Ploiești site to Britain, its main guarantor of national sovereignty. Romania's production was about equal to that of Ohio, ranked 16th producer in the US, then a major oil-producing nation. The largest refinery, Astra Română, processed two million tons of petroleum a year but, as Britain's fortunes waned from the beginning of 1940, Romania turned to Germany using its oil as a bargaining tool, hoping for protection from the Soviet Union. On 29 May 1940 it stopped sending its oil to Britain, and signed an arms and oil pact with Germany; Romania was soon providing half her oil needs. Britain was able to arrange alternative supplies with the Anglo-Iranian Oil Agreement, signed on 28 August 1940.

The British Supreme War Council met in London on 28 March to discuss ways to intensify the blockade. According to The Economist, in April 1940 the war was costing the UK£5m per day out of total government expenditure of £6.5 – 7m per day. This was during the phoney war, before the fighting on land and air had begun. The Prime Minister said that, while it was out of the question to purchase all exportable surpluses, concentration on certain selected commodities such as minerals, fats and oil could have a useful effect, and announced a deal for Britain to acquire the entire export surplus of whale oil from Norway. Later Britain signed the Anglo-Swiss Trade Deal, and negotiations for war trade agreements were also concluded with Sweden, Norway, Iceland, Belgium, the Netherlands, and Denmark. Commercial agreements were negotiated with Spain, Turkey, and Greece, aimed at limiting material to Germany.

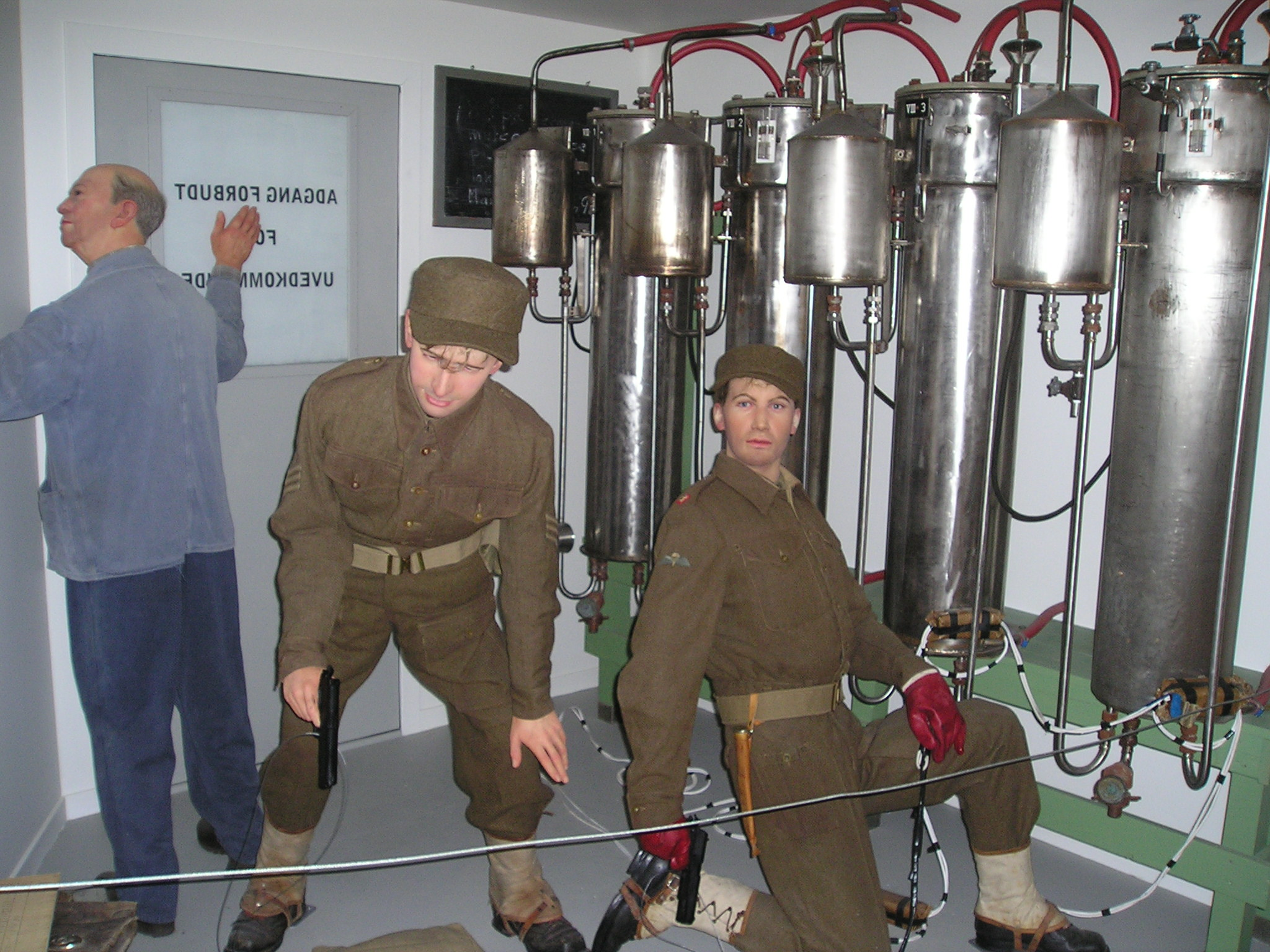
A reconstruction of the Operation Gunnerside team planting explosives to destroy the cascade of electrolysis chambers in the Vemork heavy water (deuterium) plant.

Chamberlain also indicated that steps were being taken to stop the Swedish iron ore trade, and a few days later the Norwegian coast was mined in Operation Wilfred. But perhaps the most important measure taken at this time was the setting up of the Special Operations Executive (SOE). SOE's origins go back to March 1939 following the German invasion of Czechoslovakia. It was set up by Lord Halifax with funding from the Secret Vote authorised by Prime Minister Chamberlain. In July 1940 Winston Churchill asked the Lord President (Neville Chamberlain) to define its structure and the document held at Kew CAB66/1 Extract 2 thereafter became known as the Charter of SOE. This Charter also defined the relationship of various organs of state including the security and police services with one another and initially the minister was the new Minister of Economic Warfare Hugh Dalton. Though very few people knew of it at the time, the new organisation, the earlier version of which carried out the attempt to dynamite the Iron Gate on the Danube, marked a new direction in the Economic War that would pay dividends later on, providing vital intelligence on potential strategic targets for the offensive bomber campaigns that came later in the war. There were turf wars from time to time with SIS who did not want to risk sources being compromised by SOE sabotage of enemy targets.

=== Bombing of Germany ===
Shortly after the German invasion of the Low Countries and France, the British took the first tentative steps towards the opening of a strategic air offensive aimed at carrying the fight to Germany. On 11 May 1940 the RAF bombed the city of Mönchengladbach. On the night of 15/16 May 1940, RAF Bomber Command, which until that point had been used for little more than attacking coastal targets and dropping propaganda leaflets, set off on a night time raid on oil production and railway marshalling yards in the Ruhr district.

The mining and manufacturing region of the Ruhr, often likened to the Black Country in the Midlands of England, was one of the world's greatest concentrations of metal production and processing facilities as well as chemical and textile factories; the Ruhr was also home to several synthetic oil production plants. So much smog was produced by these industries that precision bombing was almost impossible. As Germany's most important industrial region, it had been equipped with strong air defenses – Hermann Göring had already declared, "The Ruhr will not be subjected to a single bomb. If an enemy bomber reaches the Ruhr, my name is not Hermann Göring!" Because of the smog and the lack of aircraft fitted for aerial photography, the British were unable to determine how effective the raid had been; in fact the damage was negligible.

== Second phase, June 1940 to December 1941 ==
=== Fall of France ===
The signing of the armistice with France in the Compiègne Forest on 24 June 1940 greatly changed the conditions of the Economic War. Hitler assumed control over the whole of Western Europe and Scandinavia (except for Sweden and Switzerland) from the north tip of Norway high above the Arctic Circle to the Pyrenees on the border with Spain, and from the River Bug in Poland to the English Channel. Germany established new airfields and U-boat bases all the way down the West Norwegian and European coasts. On 30 June 1940 German occupation of the Channel Islands began. In early August Germans installed Dover Strait coastal guns.

From early July the German air force began attacking convoys in the English channel from its new bases and cross-channel guns shelled the Kentish coast in the opening stages of the Battle of Britain. On 17 August, following his inability to convince the British to make peace, Hitler announced a general blockade of the entire British Isles and gave the order to prepare for a full invasion of England codenamed Operation Sea Lion. On 1 August Italy, having joined the war, established a submarine base in Bordeaux. Its submarines were more suited to the Mediterranean, but they successfully ran the British gauntlet through the Straits of Gibraltar and joined the Atlantic blockade. On 20 August Benito Mussolini announced a blockade of all British ports in the Mediterranean, and over the next few months the region would experience a sharp increase in fighting.

Meanwhile, in Spain, which had still not recovered from her own civil war in which over one million died and which was in the grip of famine, General Francisco Franco continued to resist German attempts to persuade him to enter the war on the Axis side. Spain supplied Britain with iron ore from the Bay of Biscay, but, as a potential foe, she was a huge threat to British interests as she could easily restrict British naval access into the Mediterranean, either by shelling the Rock of Gibraltar or by allowing the Germans to lay siege to it from the mainland. Although Spain could gain the restoration of the rock itself and Catalonia under French administration, Franco could see Britain was far from defeated and that British forces backed by its huge powerful navy would occupy the Canary Islands. At this point Franco saw that the Royal Navy had reduced the German navy in Norway to an impotent surface threat, the Luftwaffe had lost the Battle of Britain, the Royal Navy had destroyed much of the French fleet at Mers-el-Kébir, had also destroyed Italian battleships at Taranto and the British Army was routing the Italian army in North & East Africa. Franco continued to play for time. Franco made excessive demands of Hitler which he knew could not be satisfied as his personal price for participation, such as the ceding of most of Morocco and much of Algeria to Spain by France. Operation Felix failed to materialise.

American opinion was shocked at the fall of France and the previous isolationist sentiment, which led to the Neutrality Acts from 1935 onwards, was slowly giving rise to a new realism. Roosevelt had already managed to negotiate an amendment to the acts on 21 September 1939, known as Cash and Carry, which though in theory maintained America's impartiality, blatantly favoured Britain and her Commonwealth. Under the new plan, weapons could now be bought by any belligerent providing they paid up front and took responsibility for delivery, but whereas Germany had virtually no foreign exchange and was unable to transport much material across the Atlantic, Britain had large reserves of gold and foreign currency, and while U-boats would be a threat, the likelihood was that her vast navy would ensure that the majority of equipment safely delivered to port.

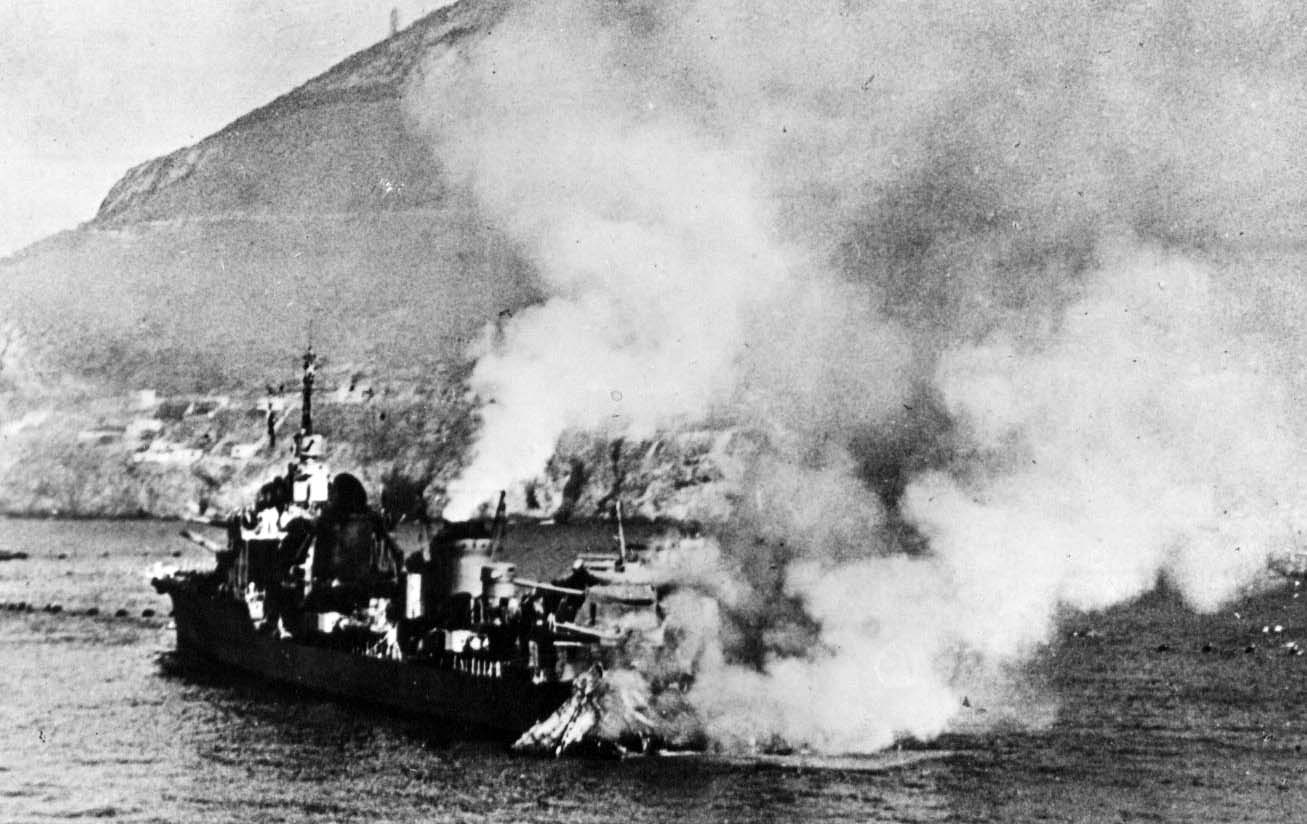
Mogador burning after shellfire following the British attack on the French fleet at Mers-el-Kébir to prevent it from falling into German hands

The US now accepted that it needed to increase spending for its own defense, especially with the growing threat of Japan, but there was real concern that Britain would fall before the weapons were delivered. Despite the success in evacuating a third of a million men at Dunkirk and the later evacuations from St Malo and St Nazaire, the British army left behind 2,500 heavy guns, 64,000 vehicles, 20,000 motor cycles and well over half a million tons of stores and ammunition. To help in the interim, Congress agreed to let Britain have a million mothballed First World War rifles, stored in grease with around fifty rounds of ammunition for each. But, following the British attack on the French fleet at Oran on 4 July to prevent it from falling into German hands, the British were proving they would do whatever was necessary to continue the fight, and Roosevelt was now winning his campaign to convince Congress to be even more supportive of Britain, with the Destroyers for Bases Agreement and with the approval of a British order for 4,000 tanks.

=== Compulsory Navicerts ===
Because of Germany's new proximity on the west European coastline and the decrease in shipping traffic, ships which would normally have been used for patrolling the high seas were diverted to more urgent tasks. Britain discontinued its contraband control bases at Weymouth and The Downs and removed all but a skeleton staff from the control base at Kirkwall to continue searching the few ships bound for Sweden, Finland, Russia and her recently annexed Baltic satellites (Estonia, Latvia and Lithuania surrendered on 21 June 1940 ).

The Navicert system was greatly extended, introducing compulsory Navicerts and ships' warrants in an attempt to prevent contraband being loaded in the first place. Any consignment going to or from ports without a certificate of non-enemy origin and any ship without a ships Navicert became liable to seizure.

The lost Dutch and Danish supplies of meat and dairy products were replaced by sources in Ireland and New Zealand. Canada held a whole year's surplus of wheat, while the U.S. reserve was estimated to be the greatest in history, but Britain was suffering very heavy shipping losses as a result of expanding U-boat numbers. Virtually all Dutch and Belgian ships not captured by the Germans joined the British merchant fleet, which together with the tonnage contributed by Norway and Denmark added about one-third to Britain's merchant marine, giving them a large surplus of vessels. To prevent the enemy gaining a route to acquire supplies, the occupied countries and the unoccupied (Vichy) French zone immediately became subject to the blockade, with severe shortages and extreme hardship quickly following. Although the Ministry resisted calls that the embargo be extended to some neutral countries, it was later extended to cover the whole of metropolitan France, including Algeria, Tunisia and French Morocco.

=== German gains ===
In course of the Battle of France, the Germans captured 2,000 tanks of various types, including the heavy French Char B1 and British Matildas, 5,000 artillery pieces, 300,000 rifles and at least 4 million rounds of ammunition. These were all available to be reconditioned, cannibalised or stripped down for scrap by the men of Organisation Todt. Despite attempts to transport it away before capture, occupied nations' gold reserves were also looted, along with huge numbers of artworks, many of which have never been recovered.

Occupied countries were subjected to relentless, systematic requisitioning of anything Germany required or desired. This began with a vast physical looting, in which trains were requisitioned to carry to Germany all movable property such as captured weaponry, machinery, books, scientific instruments, art objects and furniture. As time went on other miscellaneous items such as clothing, soap, park benches, garden tools, bed linen and doorknobs were also taken. The looted goods were taken to Germany mainly by trains, which themselves were mostly kept by Germany.

Immediate steps were also taken towards the appropriation of the best of the conquered nation's food. Decrees were proclaimed to force farmers to sell their animals and existing food stores, and while in the beginning a percentage of each year's crop was negotiated as part of the armistice terms, later the seizures became much more random and all-encompassing. Next, a blatantly unfair artificial exchange rate was announced (1 Reichsmark to 20 francs in France) and practically valueless "Invasion Marks" brought into circulation, quickly inflating and devaluing the local currency. Later, German agents bought non-portable assets such as farms, real estate, mines, factories and corporations. The individual central banks were forced to underwrite and finance German industrial schemes, insurance transactions, gold and foreign exchange transfers etc.

The Germans also gained the occupied country's natural resources and industrial capacity. In some cases these new resources were considerable, and were quickly reorganized for the Nazi war machine. The earlier acquisitions of Austria and Czechoslovakia yielded few natural resources apart from 4m annual tons of iron ore, a good proportion of Germany's need. Austria's iron and steel industry at Graz, and Czechoslovakia's heavy industry near Prague, which included the mighty Skoda munitions works at Pilsen were, though highly developed, as heavily reliant on imports of raw materials as Germany's. The conquest of Poland brought Germany half a million tons of oil per year and more zinc than it would ever need, and Luxembourg, though tiny, brought a well-organized iron and steel industry 1/7th as great as Germany's.

Norway provided good stocks of chromium, aluminum, copper, nickel and 1m annual pounds of molybdenum, the chemical element used in the production of high speed steels and as a substitute for tungsten. It also allowed them to continue to ship high quality Swedish iron ore from the port of Narvik, the trade which Britain tried to prevent with Operation Wilfred. In the Netherlands, they also acquired a large, high tech tin smelter in Arnhem, though the British, foreseeing the seizure, restricted the supply of raw tin leading up to the invasion, so the amount gained was only around a sixth of a year's supply (2,500 tons) for Germany.

But by far the biggest prize was France. German memories of the Versailles Treaty and of the turbulent years of reparations, food shortages and high inflation during the years immediately after World War I caused wealthy France to be treated as a vast material resource to be bled dry, and her entire economy was geared towards meeting Germany's needs. Under the armistice conditions she had to pay the billeting costs of the occupying garrison and a daily occupation indemnity of 300 to 400 million francs. The occupied zone contained France's best industries, with a fifth of the world's iron ore in Lorraine, and 6% of its steel production capacity. Germany's heavily overburdened railway network was reinforced with 4,000 French locomotives, and 300,000 (over half) of her freight cars.

Unoccupied France (Zone libre) was left with only the rubber industries and textile factories around Lyon and its considerable reserves of bauxite, which because of the British blockade ended up in German hands anyway, giving her abundant supplies of aluminum for aircraft production. Along with the copper and tin she received from Russia, Yugoslav copper, Greek antimony and chromium and its Balkan sources, Germany now had sufficient supplies of most metals and coal. She also had around 2/3 of Europe's industrial capacity but lacked the necessary raw materials to feed the plants, many of them working at low capacity or closed because of RAF bombing, the general chaos and the flight of the populations.

From the beginning of the war, Germany experienced massive labour shortages and as time went by the occupied nations labour forces were virtually enslaved, either to work in factories to supply the Reich or sent to Germany to work in the factories or farms there. In Germany herself, there was a chronic shortage of men to work the fields and 30,000 agricultural labourers were brought in from Italy along with thousands of Polish slaves. The pre-war stockpiles of goods were running down and more ersatz substitutes were being used. In addition, Germany remained cut off by the blockade from oversea supplies, such as copper from Chile, nickel from Canada, tin and rubber from the East Indies, manganese from India, tungsten from China, industrial diamonds from South Africa and cotton from Brazil. Germany's Axis partner Italy was now also subject to blockade and, heavily reliant on her for coal, became a net drain, but Hitler's main problem was oil, around 12.5m tons of which were needed per year for total war. Besides the Rumanian supply, his own synthetic industry produced 600,000 tons per year, and another 530,000 came from Poland. Russia was known to have enormous reserves of oil and gas but had chronically underdeveloped extraction systems, and though there was talk of German engineers going to reorganize them, it would take around two years before large quantities would begin flowing.

=== Battle of Britain ===
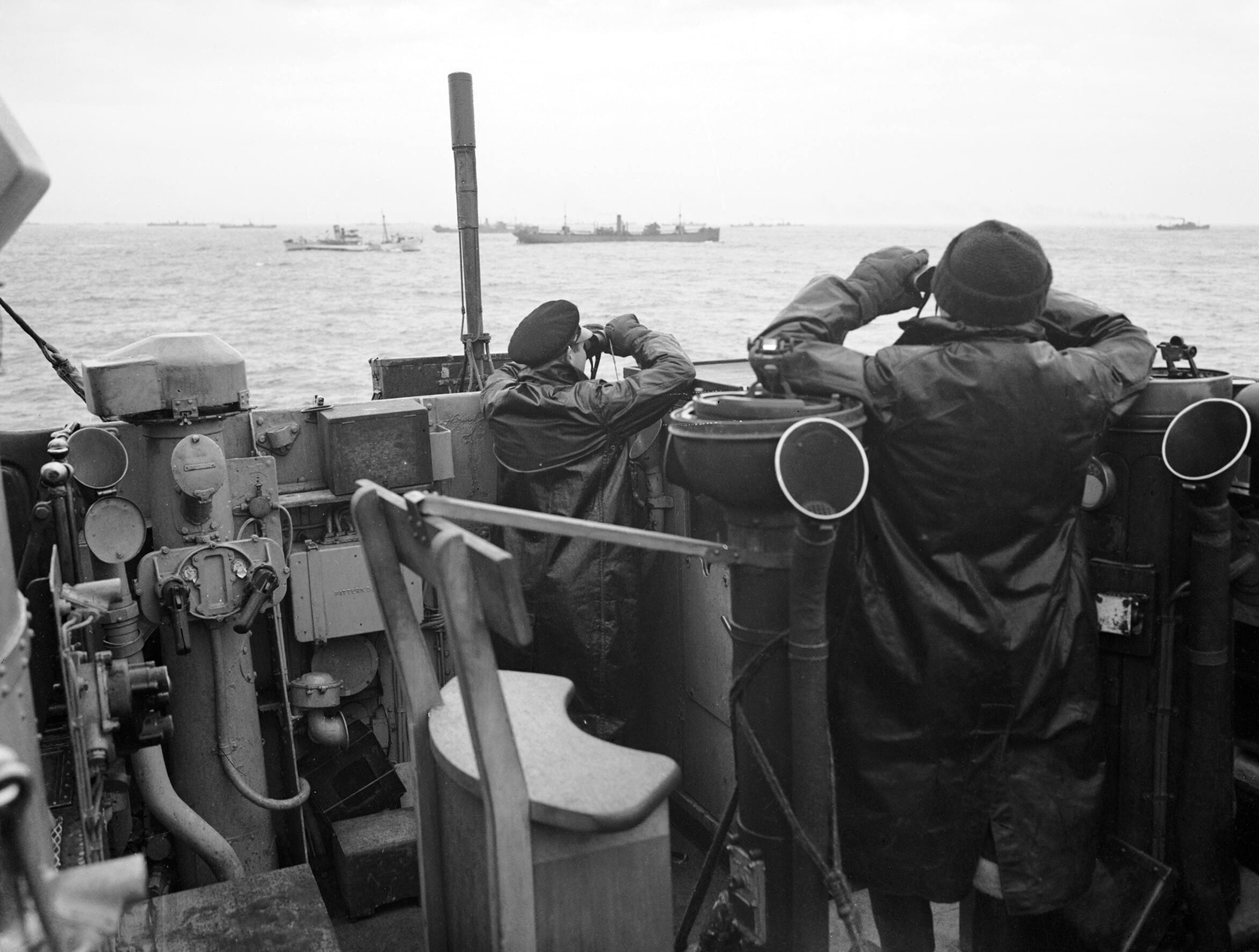
Officers on the bridge of a destroyer, escorting a large convoy of ships keep a sharp look out for attacking enemy submarines during the Battle of the Atlantic in October 1941.

Hitler's best chance of beating the blockade was by knocking Britain out of the war. By far Britain's best weapon was her navy, which not only enforced the blockade, but also, despite the attempts of the U-boats and aircraft, continued to largely control the seas and keep her supplied with most of her needs. Her vast empire gave her formidable resources to draw on, excellent foreign credit facilities and gold reserves, and British rationing was nowhere as severe as in Germany. The only rationing introduced immediately at the war's beginning was petrol. Bacon, butter and sugar followed on 8 January 1940, meat on 11 March, with tea and margarine in July. It was not until U-boat successes in the Battle of the Atlantic began severely restricting convoys in late 1940 that rationing became more widespread, and even then many workers and children still had school meals and work canteens to supplement their rations, which made a significant difference to the amount of food they actually received. Photographs of abundant fruit markets, butchers, fishmongers and grocers were placed in foreign publications to prove to American and Commonwealth readers that Britain was not, as the Nazis claimed, starving. Britain did rely on imports for a large proportion of its foodstuffs and, even with the widespread 'Dig for Victory' campaign and the use of women farm workers, could only produce around two-thirds of its needs.

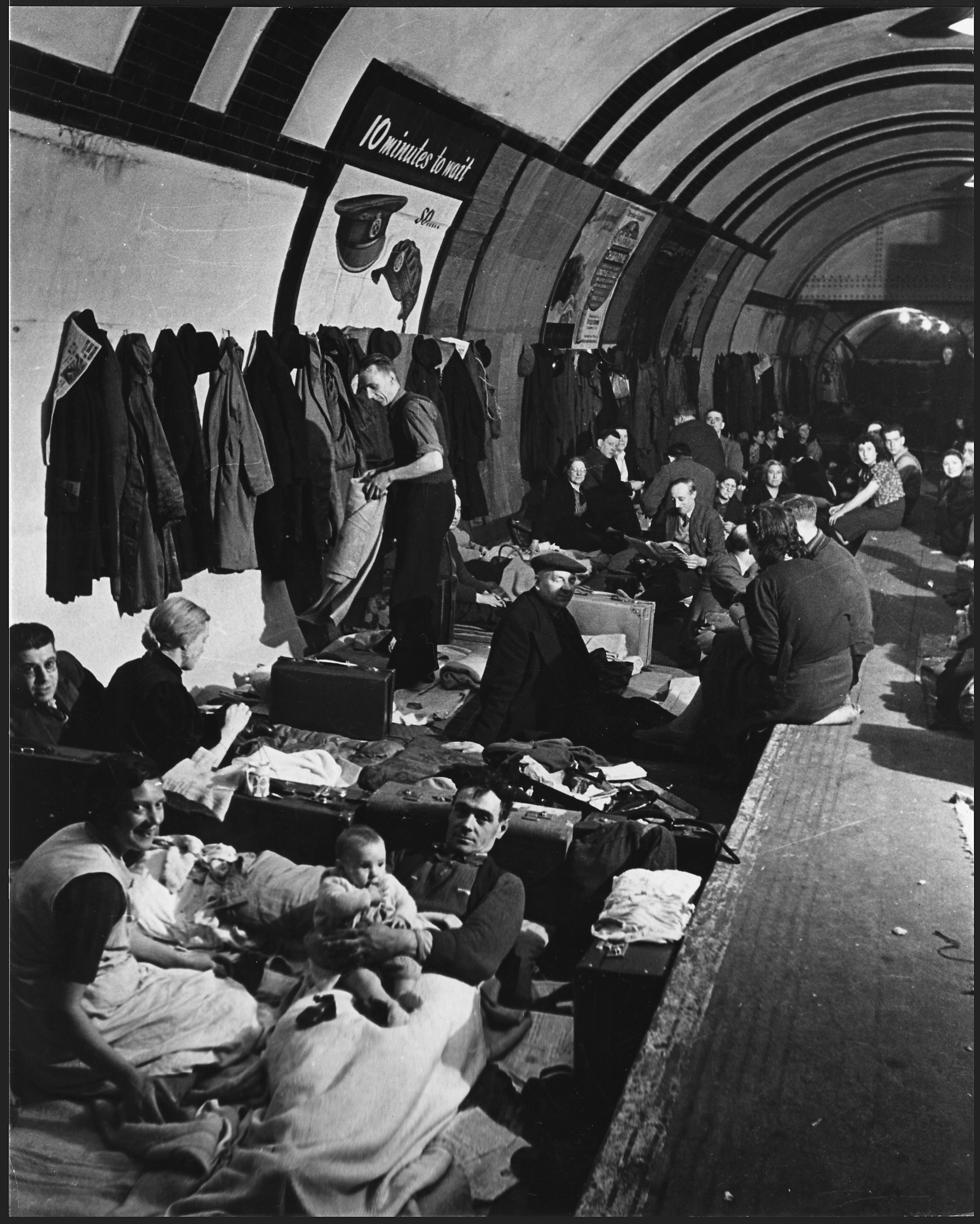
An air raid shelter in a London Underground station in London during the Blitz.

Prior to the start of the Blitz (bombing of population centres), which eventually killed over 40,000 civilians but which gave British industry the breathing space it needed to provide the fighter aircraft and ammunition to hold off invasion, docks on the south coast such as Southampton, Portsmouth and Plymouth were heavily damaged by German bombing raids; in response as much maritime traffic as possible was directed to the west and north. On 16 August the Luftwaffe claimed to have destroyed Tilbury Docks and the Port of London, which normally handled a million tons of cargo per week. To the Nazis' glee, the skipper of one Brazilian freighter stated that southern Britain was finished and nothing could save her, but although the damage was severe, ships from all parts of the Empire, South America and the Far East continued to unload food and war goods for Britain and to load cargoes for export. With no passenger trade, and with all Scandinavian and continental sea traffic suspended, the port was far less busy than normal, but as many as 35,000 men still filled the warehouses with grain, tobacco, flour, tea, rubber, sugar, meat, wool, timber and leather every day throughout August 1940. British aircraft factories, led by the Minister of Aircraft Production, Lord Beaverbrook worked around the clock to greatly increase production and prevent a collapse of the RAF. On 16 September Time magazine wrote "Even if Britain goes down this fall, it will not be Lord Beaverbrook's fault. If she holds out, it will be his triumph. This war is a war of machines. It will be won on the assembly line".

In an effort to force Britain into submission, the Luftwaffe concentrated its efforts on factories, ports, oil refineries and airfields. By mid-August the attacks were becoming increasingly co-ordinated and successful. On 24 August, at the height of the battle, bombers sent to attack Fighter Command installations and oil refineries on the outskirts of London killed civilians in houses in central London through a navigational error, although many believed the bombing was deliberate. In spite of opposition from the air ministry, Churchill ordered the bombing of Berlin in retaliation, and that night the German capital was bombed for the first time, although there were no fatalities. Britons were pleased as it showed Britain was able to hit back, and the next day Berliners were reported to be stunned and disillusioned; Göring, who had said it would never happen, was ridiculed by both sides. When the bombing continued, the Nazi leadership ordered the Luftwaffe to begin bombing British cities on 7 September in the belief that this would damage civilian morale so much that Britain would sue for peace.

The Battle of Britain raged throughout August and September 1940, but the Luftwaffe was unable to destroy the RAF to gain the air supremacy which was a prerequisite for the invasion. At night, aircraft of RAF Bomber Command and RAF Coastal Command flew the short distance across the channel and attacked the shipping and barges which were being assembled in the ports at Antwerp, Ostend, Calais and Boulogne to carry the invasion force across, eventually destroying over 20% of the fleet. Finally, on 12 October, the invasion was called off until spring 1941, although British cities, notably London, Birmingham and Liverpool continued to be heavily bombed for another 6 months.

=== European food shortages ===
Despite Germany's industrial gains, food was another matter. Even in peace, Europe was unable to feed itself, and although Germany now held two-fifths of the green fields of Europe, Germans found that despite decrees forcing farmers to sell their produce and livestock and outright requisition, in terms of food the occupied lands represented a net drain on their resources that could not be made good.

While Denmark, the "Larder of Europe", produced massive quantities of bacon, eggs and dairy products, this was heavily dependent on imports of fertilizer from Britain. Before very long, livestock was being slaughtered because of a lack of fodder – the pigs so undernourished that they broke their legs walking to slaughter. Danish farmers paid large taxes, and merchant sailors were driven to work as labourers in Germany because of the blockade. Likewise the Netherlands, with its 2.7m cattle, 650,000 sheep, half a million pigs, and huge surplus of butter, cheese, meat, milk, margarine and vegetable oils, depended on Britain for its animal fodder. Much of the arable land had been ruined by opening the dikes during the Nazi invasion and many farmers refused to sell the Germans cattle, but soon there was such a meat shortage that the authorities had to confiscate bootlegged dog-meat sausages. Because the Germans forced Dutch fishermen to return to port before dark there was also a shortage of fish, and although Dutch overseas possessions were among the world's main providers of tobacco, it could not breach the blockade. Steel, iron and wood were so hard to obtain that the work of rebuilding Rotterdam came to a standstill.

Life was particularly harsh in Poland. Cholera broke out in concentration camps, and mass public executions added to the estimated 3 million Poles already killed during the invasion. Thousands had already died of cold and from starvation during the first winter of the war and with its sugar beet, rye and wheat systematically stripped away, and with few farmers left on the land, conditions quickly grew worse. Norway, with extensive mountainous areas relied on imports for half its food and all its coal; shortages and hunger quickly affected Belgium which, despite being densely populated and producing only half its needs, was still subjected to the widespread confiscation of food.

France, normally able to feed itself, now had an extra 5 million refugees from other countries to care for. When the Germans stripped the farms of half a million horses and mules for their army, causing a large drop in agricultural productivity, they also took 11% of remaining food stocks, a million tons. The Germans held 1,500,000 French prisoners of war as hostages, feeding them on bread and soup so thin that grass was added to bulk it up, and most items were now heavily rationed, with a worker entitled to a daily diet of only 1,200 calories; many people rode bicycles into the countryside during the weekend to scavenge for food. German soldiers got double rations, but this was still only a modest daily diet, similar to that served to inmates in American prisons.

The Greek counter-offensive against the Italian attack through Albania.

The British blockade of the Mediterranean immediately cut Italy off from 80% of its imports. Essential items such as pasta, flour and rice were severely rationed, leading to riots, and any farmer withholding his crops from compulsory storage could be imprisoned for a year. Following their disastrous invasion of Greece from occupied Albania on 28 October 1940, Italian reserves of rubber, cotton, wool and other commodities began to dwindle, and the high prices charged by Germany to haul coal across the Alps from Trieste made heat a luxury. On 11 November Britain scored a major victory against the Italian navy at Taranto, which secured British supply lines in the Mediterranean.

Even in the normally plentiful Balkan region there were now food shortages caused by an extremely hard winter in the east and flooding of the lower Danube which devastated the agricultural plains and prevented the planting of crops. In Romania, farm hands were still mobilized into the Army and, along with Hungary and Yugoslavia, she needed all the wheat that could be produced, but the Germans made heavy demands on them, backed up by threats.

Until late 1940 Hitler hoped to establish peaceful German hegemony over the Balkans as part of his supply hinterland, but after the Soviet occupation of Bessarabia and northern Bukovina from Romania in late June, his hand was forced. On 7 October Germany invaded Romania to block the Soviet Army and to get access to the Ploiești oilfields. After Italy's disastrous invasion of Greece on 28 October the British intervened in accordance with the Anglo-Greek Mutual Aid Agreement, occupying Crete and establishing airfields within bombing distance of the Romanian oilfields. In late November Hungary and Romania signed the Tripartite Pact, joining the Axis powers and, although Yugoslavia initially refused to sign, Hitler now had control of the majority of the vast agricultural resources of the Great Hungarian Plain and Romanian oilfields.

Britain's Bomber Command continued to attack German strategic targets, but the task of bombing Germany was made much harder by the loss of the French airfields as it meant long flights over enemy-held territory before reaching the target. But the British at this point had no effective means of taking offensive action against the enemy, and began to look towards a renewed bomber strategy. After the German devastation of Coventry, the RAF raided oil refineries in Mannheim city centre on the night of 16–17 December. This was the first "area raid", but photography after the raid showed that most of the 300 bombers had missed the target, and that Bomber Command lacked the means of carrying out precision raids. Even so, a bombing campaign offered the only hope of damaging the German economy, and directives at the end of 1940 stated two objectives: precision attack on German production of synthetic oil, and an attack on German morale by targeting industrial sites in large cities. In December 1940 Roosevelt, having won an historic third term as president declared that the U.S. would become the "Arsenal of Democracy", providing the weapons Britain and her Commonwealth needed without entering the war herself.

As 1940 drew to a close, the situation for many of Europe's 525 million people was dire. With the food supply reduced by 15% by the blockade and another 15% by poor harvests, starvation and diseases such as influenza, pneumonia, tuberculosis, typhus and cholera were a threat. Germany was forced to send 40 freight cars of emergency supplies into occupied Belgium and France, and American charities such as the Red Cross, the Aldrich Committee, and the American Friends Service Committee began gathering funds to send aid. Former president Herbert Hoover, who had done much to alleviate the hunger of European children during World War I, wrote:

The food situation in the present war is already more desperate than at the same stage in the [First] World War. ... If this war is long continued, there is but one implacable end ... the greatest famine in history.

=== 1941 ===
From the beginning of 1941 the war moved increasingly eastwards. On 28 December 1940 Mussolini appealed for urgent German help in the Greco-Italian War. Germany was also forced to send the Afrika Korps to Libya in early February, led by General Erwin Rommel, to help its Axis partner in its North African campaigns against the British and Commonwealth forces. The Italians were also buckling under a strong British and Indian counter-offensive in Eritrea in East Africa. Because of its strategic position in the Mediterranean close to Sicily and the Axis shipping lanes, the British island of Malta also came under daily enemy bombardment in the Siege of Malta, and by the end of the year the island had suffered over 1,000 bombing attacks to force a surrender. As more U-boats entered service, the weekly toll on Allied merchant ships continued to mount, and by June eggs, cheese, jam, clothing and coal were added to the rationed list.

In early January 1941 German officials announced the signing of "the greatest grain deal in history" between the Soviet Union and Germany. The Soviets, who also concluded a £100 million arms deal with China shortly afterwards, expected criticism from Britain and America; Izvestia newspaper declared;

There are in Britain and the United States some leading statesmen who believe that the United States may sell to Britain everything ... whereas the Soviet Union cannot sell to Germany even cereals without violating the policy of peace.

=== Humanitarian aid in Europe ===
In January Herbert Hoover's National Committee on Food for the Small Democracies presented the exiled Belgian Government in London with a plan he had agreed with the German authorities to set up soup kitchens in Belgium to feed several million destitute people. Under the plan, the Germans agreed to supply 1m bushels (1 US bushel = 8 US gallons, about 27 kg for wheat) of bread grains each month, and the committee was to provide 20,000 tons of fats, soup stock and children's food. However, Britain refused to allow this aid through their blockade. Their view, which many in America and the occupied countries supported, was that it was Germany's responsibility to feed and provide for the people she conquered, and that the plan could not avoid indirectly helping Germany; if aid were given, this would free German goods for use elsewhere.

Hoover said that his information indicated that the Belgian ration was already down to 960 calories – less than half the amount necessary to sustain life – and that many children were already so weak they could no longer attend school, but the British disputed this. Even so, many Americans were appalled by the continuing hardship. There were 16m French Americans alone, and by early March at least 15 different organizations – collectively known as the Coordinating Council for French Relief – were distributing aid in France through The American Friends Service Committee, while the Quaker Committee also distributed around $50,000 worth of food, clothing and medical supplies a month throughout France. The American Red Cross chartered a "mercy ship", SS Cold Harbor to take 12,000,000 lb (5,400,000 kg) of evaporated and powdered milk and 150,000 articles of children's clothing, 500,000 units of insulin and 20,000 bottles of vitamins to Marseille and shortly afterwards sent a second, the SS Exmouth, to carry $1.25m worth of relief supplies into unoccupied France.

A number of prominent liberals denounced the release of food to France in a letter to United States Secretary of State Cordell Hull. Describing how French industry was working for the Germans and how Hitler had seized 1m tons of French wheat to hold in occupied France, the group believed the move would undermine the blockade and lead to Nazi demands for America to continue feeding other conquered lands. Vichy France's ambassador to the United States, Gaston Henry-Haye, continued to press for a relaxation of the blockade on humanitarian grounds, and the US government found itself in a difficult moral dilemma. The US Foreign Affairs Economist Karl Brandt described how Hitler (and Stalin) used food as a political weapon to destroy internal opposition, reward accomplishment, punish failure and smash their enemies in neutral countries. He described how the "warrior caste" were given the most, followed by essential workmen (in Berlin, William Shirer and the other foreign journalists were classed as "heavy labourers" and received double rations) while at the bottom prisoners, Jews and the insane got the least. By this time the Nazis had begun executing otherwise healthy mental patients in German institutions, in part to save on food, and there was a clamour from family members to have their loved ones removed. Brandt said:

Supplies are suddenly cut down regardless of the amount stored to scare the population and extra rations are suddenly granted to boost morale in a bad time. Food statistics are guarded like bomber planes. To the Nazis, food is a beautiful instrument ... for manoeuvring and disciplining the masses.

By this time there were increasing reports of Vichy French vessels in the Mediterranean running the British blockade from North African ports and ignoring the orders of the British Contraband Control to stop and submit to search. Vichy Vice-Premier Admiral Darlan declared that the Vichy merchant marine had so far brought through the blockade 7m bushels of grain, 363,000 tons of wine, 180,000 tons of peanut oil together with large amounts of fruit, sugar, cocoa, meat, fish and rum. Darlan, who during the battle of France had given Churchill the solemn pledge that the French navy would never surrender to Germany, claimed that the British were reluctant to risk a third bloody clash like those at Dakar and Oran, and that, while they had sunk seven unescorted French food ships, they had never sunk, or even stopped, a French ship escorted by warships.

=== Lend-Lease ===
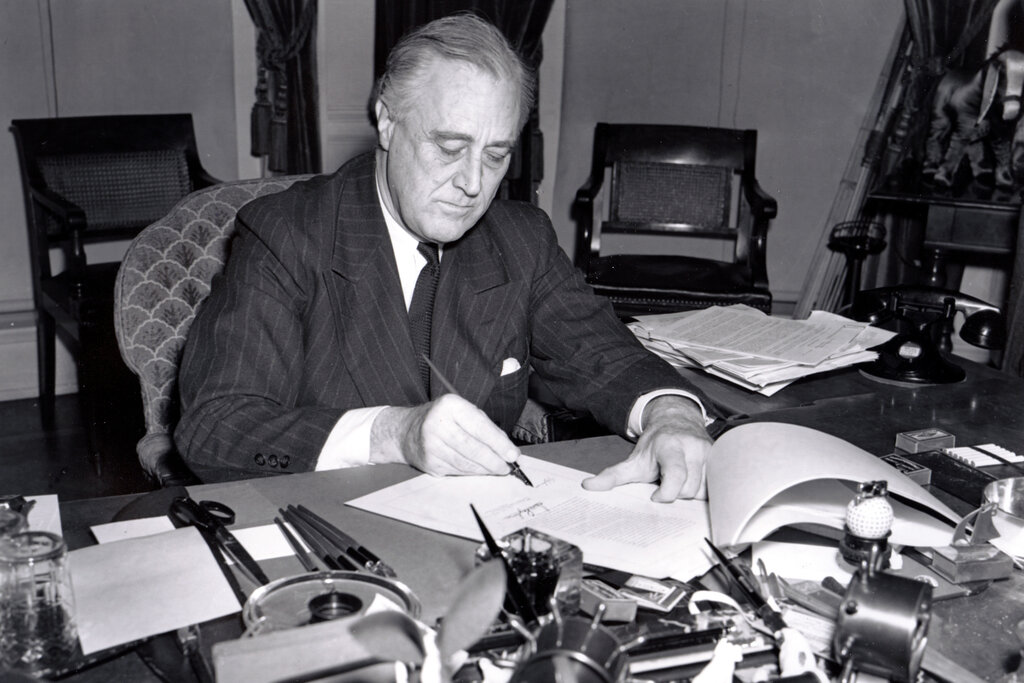
President Franklin D. Roosevelt signing the lend-lease bill to give aid to the UK, China and Greece, 1941.

Despite the effects of her blockade, there was no debate about America's resolve to feed Britain herself, and she was able to, with record harvests. But Britain, having already sold £1 billion of her foreign investments and taken on another £3 billion in loans to pay for war materials was now feeling the financial strain of the war. On 11 March 1941 Roosevelt and Congress passed into law the programme of Lend-Lease, which allowed for the sending of vast amounts of war material to Allied countries, and Churchill thanked the American nation for a 'new Magna Carta'. Although America did not enter the war for another nine months, she could no longer claim to be completely neutral and Hitler immediately ordered U-boats to attack US vessels. On 10 April the destroyer USS Niblack, which was picking up survivors from a Dutch freighter that had been sunk detected that a U-boat was preparing to attack, and launched depth charges to drive it away. This was the first direct action between Germany and America of World War II. The next day the US began regular patrols at sea.

=== Effects on South American trade ===
The world's blockades had a severe impact on world trade. On the outbreak of war, many South American countries expected to make big profits supplying the belligerents as in World War I. Nearly all of Bolivia's copper, lead, tin and silver was exported to Europe, while Uruguay and southern Brazil supplied wool and canned and frozen beef. Argentina had 84% of the world supply of flaxseed, nearly all of which was exported, along with much of its wheat (23% of world supply), its corn (71%) and beef (50%). With the stalemate of blockade and counter-blockade, total foreign trade plummeted and large surpluses piled up. In early February 1941 the main exporting Plata nations (Argentina, Brazil, Uruguay, Paraguay and Bolivia) held a conference in Montevideo to discuss ways of improving trade between themselves and the rest of the continent. Apart from some Parana pine, tea and cereals, there was very little inter-Plata trade, and delegates eventually agreed a number of measures, such as easier currency exchange rules, finance for poorer nations, improved transport links between countries – particularly those landlocked – and lower customs barriers to demonstrate that they were not entirely reliant on overseas trade and American dollars to survive.

In America, while many small businesses that relied on overseas trade were badly affected; because cheaper foreign imports were unavailable, home producers, such as the North Carolina peppermint trade and the handmade glassware industry in Maryland and Pennsylvania now had the domestic market to themselves. U.S. cheese-makers began producing substitutes for Norway's Gjetost, the Netherlands' Gouda and Edam, Italy's Asiago and Provolone and the blue cheeses of France and with Belgium and the Netherlands' tulip bulbs cut off, U.S. growers in Michigan, North Carolina and the Pacific Northwest were able to achieve twice the pre-war prices. Experiments also began in Alabama's state prison farm to grow Ramie, a tough, stiff fibre used in gas mantles which was no longer available from East and Southeast Asia.

=== German invasion of the Soviet Union ===
For the Nazis, the capture of the Russian landmass, one-sixth of the Earth's land surface or 8,000,000 sq mi (21,000,000 km^{2}), provided the Lebensraum they demanded and the answer to all their raw material shortages. On 22 June 1941 Germany invaded the Soviet Union in a three-pronged operation, catching the Soviets surprise. They penetrated deep into Soviet territory, and within a week completed an encirclement of 300,000 Red Army troops near Minsk and Białystok. The first territories to be conquered included the most productive. Between Baku on the Caspian Sea and Batum on the Black Sea lay the rich oilfields of Transcaucasia, while bordering Poland and Romania was the abundant "Granary of Russia", Ukraine, about the size of France, 40×10^{6} acres (160,000 km^{2}) of some of the most fertile agricultural land on earth. Occupying a Chernozem zone of seemingly inexhaustible thick humus, it produced 25% of Russia's wheat, and immense crops of rye, barley, oats, sugar beet, potatoes, sunflowers, flax, maize, tobacco and cotton. Ukraine was a major industrial region. Its Donetz Basin provided 70% of the iron, 50% of the steel, 72% of the aluminium and 35% of the manganese of the USSR, as well as being one of Europe's largest coalfields, yielding 67,000,000 long tons (68,000,000 t) per year.

Russia had had a reputation as a backward, agrarian country, but the communist government was well aware of the dangers of overly relying on the Ukraine and of the need to modernise its industry. The whole face of the Soviet economy was transformed from 1928 by Joseph Stalin's three Five Year Plans, and whereas 75% of industry was formerly concentrated around Moscow, St Petersburg, and Ukraine, planned industrial cities, such as Stalingorsk in west Siberia and Karaganda in Kazakhstan, places that had been barely inhabited a decade prior. A massive cotton operation was begun in Turkestan, new wheat growing regions in the centre, east and north, coal mines were opened and expanded in Siberia, rich mineral deposits tapped from the Urals, across Asiatic Russia, and immense new oil wells and refineries were developed in the Caucasus and Volga valley.

During the first six months the Soviets were in disarray and lost armies of men, over 70% of their tanks, a third of their combat aircraft and two-thirds of their artillery. Despite these initial setbacks, the Soviets were able to move much of their industry from cities near the Dnepr River and Donbas regions further east to the Urals and Siberia. It would take a while for production to recovers as this operation took a great deal of time as the Soviets were often forced to reassemble factories in remote areas.

On 3 July Stalin announced a "scorched earth policy"; as Soviets forces and people retreated in the face of the Wehrmacht, everything that could not be moved east was to be destroyed. Factories and oil wells were blown up, crops burnt and animals slaughtered so that nothing would be left for the Germans to use.

=== Allied aid to Soviet Union ===
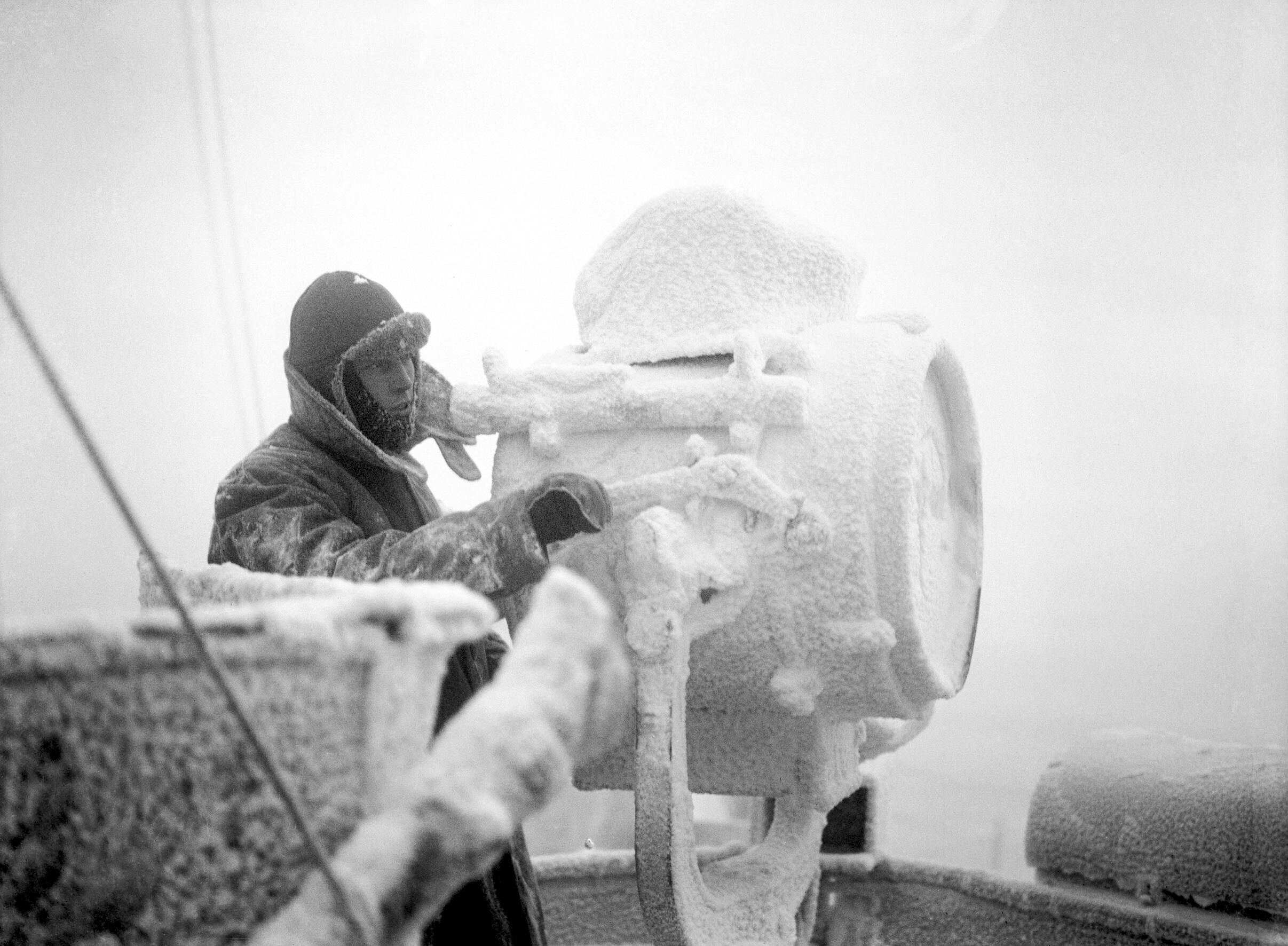
Ice forming on a 20-inch signal projector on the cruiser HMS Sheffield whilst escorting an Arctic convoy to Russia.

On 2 August 1941 the British signed the Atlantic Charter with the U.S. and extended the blockade to cover Finland, which was now fighting on the side of Germany. Churchill now embraced Soviet Union as an ally and agreed to send arms to make up the shortfall while Soviet industry reorganised itself for the fight. By mid 1942 Britain was providing Soviet Union, via the Arctic convoys with an array of vehicles, artillery and ammunition as part of the Lend Lease programme. In total Britain sent more than 4,500 Valentine, Churchill and Matilda tanks, and 4200 Hurricane and Spitfire fighter aircraft.

America also provided significant support, but while Alaska, only 50 miles (80 km) from Asia across the Bering Strait was the obvious route for transporting Lend-Lease equipment, it was remote from Contiguous United States. A land route across the roadless 800-mile (1,300 km) expanse of Canada, long discussed, now became vital, and so on 8 March 1942 the American army began construction of the Alcan Highway, a 1,671-mile (2,689 km) long stretch from Dawson Creek in British Columbia, north-west through Yukon Territory to an existing road on the Canadian/Alaskan border. The highway also allowed the linking up of the Northwest Staging Route, a series of rough Canadian airstrips and radio ranging stations built to convey aircraft from Alberta and the Yukon to Soviet Union and China. In total the US provided Soviet Union with $11 billion worth of goods, including 4,800 Grant and Sherman tanks, 350,000 trucks, 50,000 jeeps, 7,300 Airacobra fighter aircraft, and 3700 light and medium bombers. The Soviets also received 2.3 million tons of steel, 230,000 tons of aluminium, 2.6 million tons of petrol, 3.8 million tons of food and huge quantities of ammunition and explosives.

The German attack on Soviet Union prompted the British to attempt an increase in bombing in the belief that the fighter defences would have been thinned out. Attacks on oil targets remained a priority, and successful raids were mounted against Hamburg, Bremen and Kiel in May, with Kiel suffering almost complete production losses. Later attacks on rail transport targets in the Ruhr proved costly because a new radar chain, known as the Kammhuber Line now stretched across the approaches to the Ruhr valley to alert the night fighter defences, which remained considerable. Between May and December the RAF made 105 separate raids over Germany but were unable to make any inroads into industrial capacity and suffered heavy losses in the process.

On 22 June 1941 Churchill proclaimed that Britain would bomb Germany night and day, in ever increasing numbers, but because of the size of Germany and because the fleet continued to be eroded by planes going overseas, Bomber Command remained too weak for effective attacks on the German war machine. The new directives called for attacks on rail transport in the Ruhr to disrupt German economy, but this was a stop gap policy; The planes were too small, carried too light a bomb load and navigation was also shown to be faulty. Following losses of 10% during a raid on 7 November the RAF was ordered to conserve and build up its forces for a spring offensive, by which time a new navigation aid known as GEE would be available and the Avro Lancaster heavy bomber would be entering service.

== Third phase, December 1941 to 1943 ==
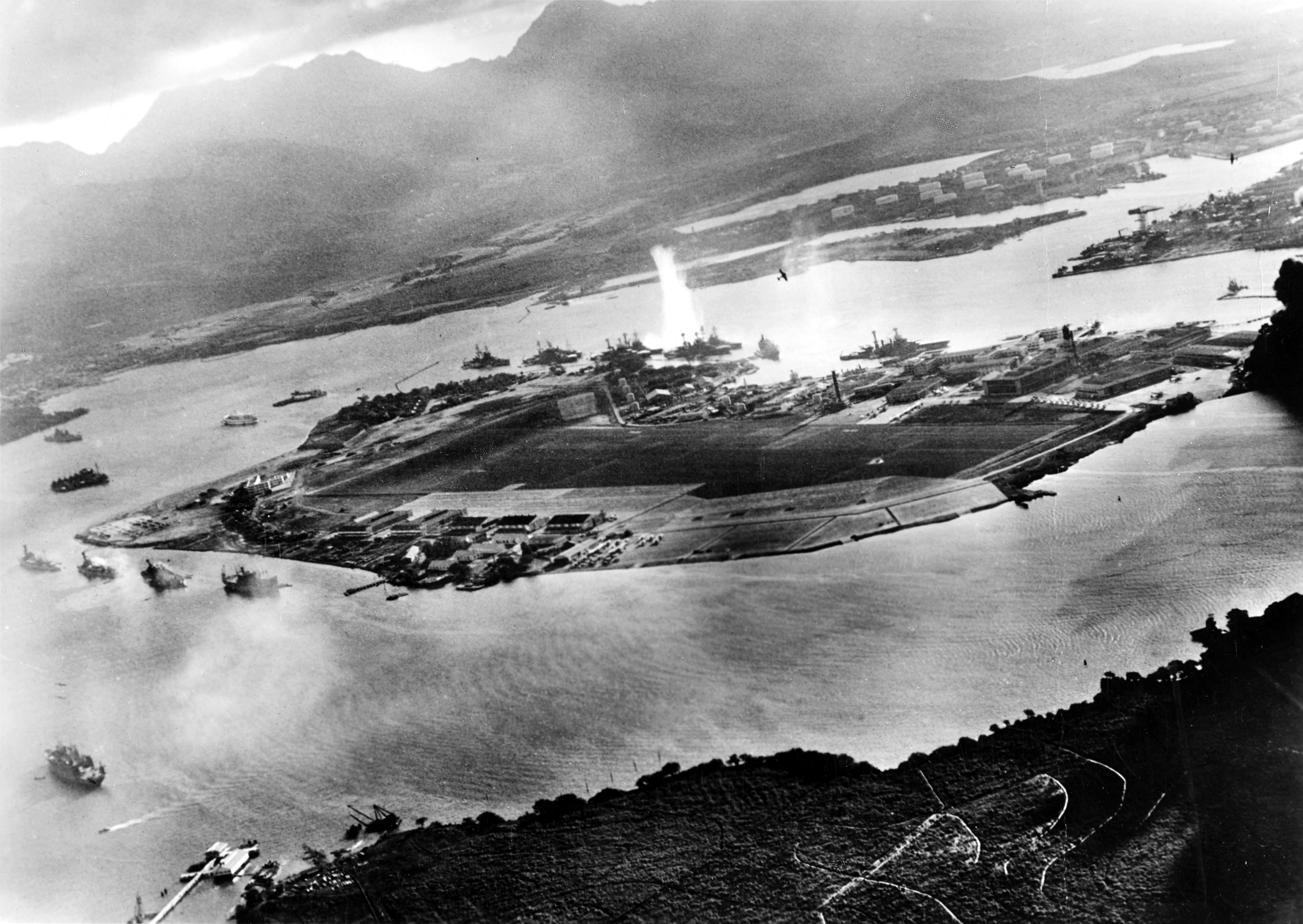
Attack on Pearl Harbor. Photograph taken from a Japanese aircraft during the torpedo attack on ships moored on both sides of Ford Island shortly after the beginning of the attack. A torpedo has just hit USS West Virginia on the far side of Ford Island (center).

On the morning of 7 December 1941 the Imperial Japanese Navy launched a massive pre-emptive strike against ships of the US Pacific Fleet at its base at Pearl Harbor, Hawaii with simultaneous invasions of the British possessions of Hong Kong, Singapore, and Malaya. The next day the war became a truly global conflict as America joined the British Empire in the war against Japan, Germany and the other Axis powers. Like Germany, Japan was heavily deficient in natural resources, and since 1931 had become increasingly nationalistic, building up her military forces and embarking upon a series of ruthless conquests in Manchuria, China and French Indochina to create an empire. Amid increasing reports of atrocities committed by her forces in these lands, such as the Nanking Massacre and the use of poison gas, world opinion turned against Japan, and from 1938 America, Britain and other countries launched trade embargoes against her to restrict supplies of the raw materials she needed to wage war, such as oil, metals and rubber.

But the sanctions did not curb Japan's imperialistic mood. Japan signed the Tripartite Pact with Germany and Italy in September 1940 and, after the US ordered a total oil embargo on all "aggressor nations" on 1 August 1941, cutting Japan off from 90% of her oil supply, she looked to the huge reserves in the south Pacific and south east Asia, territories already largely under US, British and Dutch jurisdiction. Japan knew that she could not win a prolonged war against the 'Occidental Powers', but hoped that by striking first at Pearl Harbor to knock out the American Pacific fleet then using her huge reserves of men and machines to occupy the territories she coveted while America was still unready for war, Britain was engaged in all-out struggle with Germany and the Netherlands was herself occupied, she could establish her empire and consolidate herself so firmly that although her enemies would attempt to batter at her defensive line they would eventually be forced to accept the new position and make peace on the basis of the new status quo. In the early months of the war Japan launched a series of stunning conquests in the region, among them Hong Kong, the Philippines, Malaysia, Burma and the East Indies, and soon threatened Australia far to the south.

Because the Japanese metropole consisted of islands in an archipelago, blockading Japan became a fairly straightforward matter of sinking the transport ships ferrying materials from the occupied lands to the home islands, and remained a largely American affair. The Japanese began with a barely adequate merchant fleet of 6.1m tons, which American submarines and aircraft gradually whittled away until only 1.5m tons remained. The steady toll of attrition against her merchant marine was a major factor in Japan's eventual defeat, but the Allies agreed that the situation was far more complex with Germany, where a range of measures including strategic bombing would be required to achieve final victory.

=== America joins the economic war ===
In December 1941 the United States joined the economic warfare system against the Axis that the British had developed and administered over the previous two years. The Board of Economic Warfare, (BEW) which evolved from the earlier Economic Defense Board, was created by President Roosevelt on 17 December 1941. Under the chairmanship of Vice President Henry Wallace, the new department was made responsible for the procurement and production of all imported materials necessary both to the war effort and the civilian economy. The Proclaimed List – a US equivalent to the British Statutory List – was compiled and, under British direction, the United States Commercial Corporation was formed to begin making preclusive purchases of strategic materials such as chromium, nickel and manganese to supply future Allied needs and to prevent them from reaching the Germans.

From the start there was close co-operation between the parallel American and British agencies, over economic warfare measures, intelligence gathering and the later Safehaven Program. The American Embassy in London acted as the base for the American BEW activities in Europe and was organized in March 1942, "to establish a more intimate liaison between the manifold economic warfare activities centered in the Ministry of Economic Warfare and comparable activities in the United States Government." BEW personnel sat on the Blockade Committee on equal terms with their British counterparts, undertaking the routine work of handling Navicerts, ships permits and defining contraband. The embassy division worked with MEW in the development of new war trade agreements and the re- negotiation of existing overseas purchase – supply contracts. Together they attempted to persuade the remaining neutrals – Portugal, Spain, Sweden, Turkey, Switzerland, Ireland (and Argentina) – that by supplying Germany with the materials it needed they were prolonging the war, and over time a number of measures were tried to pressure these countries into reducing or ending trade with the Axis, with varying degrees of success.

=== Portugal ===
Like General Franco in Spain, Portuguese President Antonio de Oliveira Salazar was perceived as pro-Axis but walked a fine line between the two sides, who competed fiercely for Portuguese raw materials, generating huge profits for her economy. Portugal provided Germany with direct overland exports of a wide range of commodities including rice, sugar, tobacco, wheat, potassium chlorate, inflammable liquids and yellow pitch, and Portuguese merchants were also known to be sending industrial diamonds and platinum via Africa and South America. But by far the most important material Portugal had to offer was tungsten. Tungsten carbide was a critical war commodity with numerous applications such as the production of heat-resistant steel, armour plate, armour-piercing shells and high-speed cutting tools. Portugal was Europe's leading supplier of tungsten (and scheelite, another member of the wolframite series of tungsten ore minerals), annually providing Germany with at least 2,000 metric tons between 1941 and mid-1944, about 60 percent of her total requirement.

Britain was Portugal's largest trading partner and had the right to force her to fight on her side under a 500-year-old alliance, but allowed her to remain neutral; in return Portugal allowed credit when Britain was short of gold and escudos, so that by 1945 Britain owed Portugal £322 million. Germany was Portugal's second-largest trading partner, initially paying for exports with consumer goods, but after 1942 increasingly with looted gold, which the Allies warned was liable to confiscation after the war. Portugal also allowed Germany generous credit terms, partly because after the fall of France the presence of a direct land route enabled Germany to threaten Portugal with invasion if she curtailed critical exports. The Allies, who also bought Portuguese tungsten, believed that if they could persuade the Portuguese to stop selling the ore the German machine tool industry would very quickly be crippled and she would be unable to continue to fight. Because Portugal depended on the U.S. for petroleum, coal and chemical supplies, the Allies' economic warfare agencies considered achieving their aim by embargoes, but hesitated because they also wanted access to Portuguese military bases on the Azores.

=== Spain ===
Since before the war, pro-Nazi Spain had suffered chronic food shortages which were made worse by the blockade. The Allies used a variety of measures to keep Spain neutral, such as limiting her oil supply and making trade deals at critical times to provide her with much-needed foreign exchange to buy food from South America. On 23 November 1940 Churchill wrote to Roosevelt to inform him that the peninsula was now near starvation point, and that a US offer to provide a month by month supply of food might be decisive in keeping Spain out of the war.

Spanish companies did important aircraft work for the Germans, Spanish merchants furnished Germany with industrial diamonds and platinum, and General Franco, still loyal to Hitler because of his support during the civil war, continued to supply Germany with war materials, among them mercury and tungsten. Spain, the world's second-largest producer of tungsten after Portugal, provided Germany with 1,100 metric tons of the ore per year between 1941 and 1943 (between them Spain and Portugal provided 90% of Germany's annual 3500 tons requirement). As a result of Allied economic measures and German defeats, by 1943 Spain adopted a more genuinely neutral policy. The Allied strategy with Spain was identical to that of Portugal: buy enough tungsten to satisfy the export need and prevent the rest reaching the enemy by whatever means. Britain and the US again had the option of launching an oil embargo on Spain but hesitated for fear of pushing Franco to side with Germany militarily.

=== Sweden ===
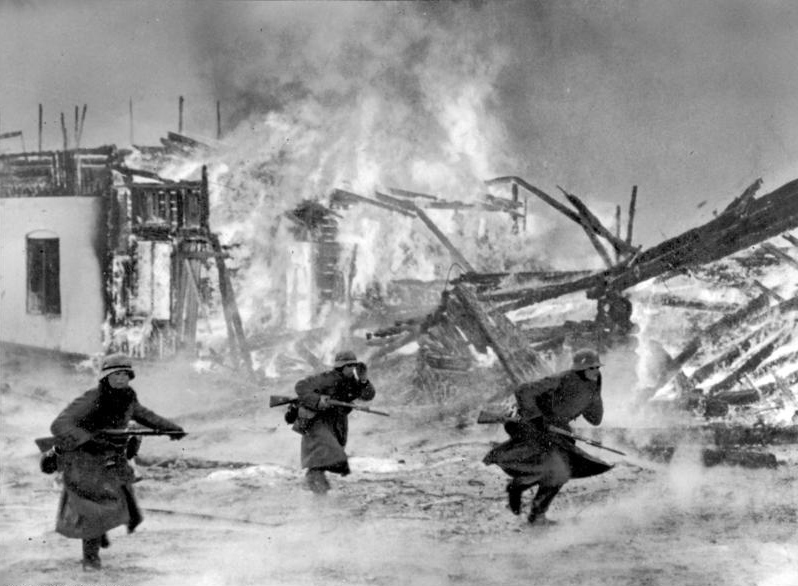
German infantry attacking through a burning Norwegian village, April 1940.

Sweden had long been Germany's main source of high quality iron ore and ball bearings, and continuation of supplies from the port of Narvik, which the British tried to stop with Operation Wilfred was one of the factors which led to the German occupation of Norway. Allied economic warfare experts believed that without the Swedish exports the war would grind to a halt, but Sweden was surrounded by Axis countries and by those occupied by them, and could have herself been occupied at any time if they failed to give Germany what she wanted.

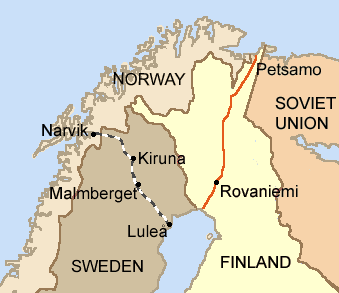
Iron ore was extracted in Kiruna and Malmberget, and taken by rail to the harbours of Luleå and Narvik. (Borders as of 1920–1940.)

The U.S. and Britain were sympathetic to Sweden's difficult position and of her attempts to maintain her neutrality and sovereignty by making important concessions to the Nazis, such as continuing to export timber and iron ore and by allowing the Germans use of their railway system, a privilege which was heavily abused. There was a general belief however, that Sweden went too far in accommodating the Nazi regime. In particular, the U.S. abhorred the use of Swedish ships to transport the ore to Germany and of her allowing Germany to transport soldiers and war materials across Sweden and through the Baltic under Swedish naval protection. Sweden received very little by way of imports due to the various blockades, and the Allies tried to use offers of a relaxation to persuade her to reduce her assistance of Germany, which they believed was actively prolonging the war. Churchill himself believed that Sweden could be instrumental in defeating Germany and after the heavy German defeats at Stalingrad and Kursk in 1943 the Russians became vocal in calling on Sweden to do more to aid the Allies.

=== Turkey ===
Despite signing a military alliance with Britain and France in October 1939, Turkey, like Sweden, Spain and Portugal spent the war keeping both sides at arm's length while continuing to supply them with their war needs. Despite the German occupation of the Balkans in spring 1941, no military action was taken against Turkey, who in October 1941 began selling Germany large quantities of chromite ore for the production of chromium. The Turkish chromite ore, which like tungsten was an irreplaceable and essential war material, was the only supply available to Germany, who paid using iron and steel products and manufactured goods in order to draw Turkey into her sphere of influence. Turkey still maintained its good relations with the US and Britain despite the trade, which the economic warfare agencies sought to minimize.

Via its Commercial Corporation, the US engaged in a preclusive buying programme under British direction of its materials, particularly the chromite ore. It also bought commodities, e.g., tobacco, it did not really need, and sent Turkey's armed forces modern equipment under Lend Lease to replace obsolete equipment, to help maintain her neutrality. In so doing the Allies sought to maintain British influence in Turkey, and when the Allies decided, at the Casablanca Conference in January 1943 to attempt to persuade Turkey to enter the war against Germany, Britain was assigned the role of negotiator. Turkey eventually ended trade with Germany and declared war on her in February 1945.

=== Argentina ===
Although most South American republics were sympathetic to the Allied cause, the US State Department was frustrated by the attitude of Argentina from the very beginning. Her government refused to cooperate with US economic warfare measures or to sever financial ties with Germany, her main trading partner. Though during the war she doubled her exports of bully beef to the US and to Britain, with whom she had a history of close ties, the government was openly pro-Nazi, particularly after the June 1943 military coup d'état, and even conspired to overthrow other Latin American governments and replace them with fascist regimes. German agents were permitted to operate and spread propaganda freely and subsidiaries of IG Farben, Staudt and Co. and Siemens also operated in Argentinian territory, maintaining their links with Germany and supporting Nazi espionage operations in the region. Although the naval blockade, now heavily reinforced by US warships, restricted their efforts, merchants in the Argentine capital of Buenos Aires smuggled important quantities of platinum, palladium, drugs, and other chemicals to Germany, and a major aim of the US contraband control was to use US exports to Argentina to put pressure on her government to turn away from Nazi influence and break financial ties.

=== Switzerland ===
Switzerland during World War II had the most complex relationship with Germany of all the neutral countries. Expecting hardship, the Swiss government spent heavily in the years prior to World War II on stockpiling food and buying armaments and, anticipating an invasion, kept its forces constantly mobilised. Following the Nazi conquests of mid 1940, the tiny landlocked nation of seven million people, which had remained resolutely neutral since 1815 found itself in a difficult position, with German officials controlling all gateways to the outside world. But despite veiled threats and the constantly strained relations between the two nations, Switzerland was of no strategic importance to Germany, and of far more use as a workshop. Although Swiss citizens largely rejected the Nazis and subscribed to the Internationalist view expressed by the League of Nations, in order to survive and continue to receive imports, Switzerland had little choice but to trade with Germany, for which she was paid largely in coal. Well-known companies such as Oerlikon-Bührle provided guns, Autophon A.G. provided transmitting apparatus, and other companies exported coal-gas generators, ball bearings, bomb sights, ammunition, carbon black, timepieces and rayon for parachutes.

Because of her geographic position and trade with Germany, Switzerland was subject to Allied blockade measures throughout, although she remained able to move imports and other exports such as sugar and benzene overland, mainly to Germany and other countries in the neutral zone. In December 1941 an attempt by the Swiss military to purchase American machine-gun cameras was blocked by Britain's refusal to grant a Navicert, and in April 1942 the US Board of Economic Warfare considered quotas for Swiss imports from overseas sources, identifying Swiss commodities which might be bargained for. Firms such as the Fischer Steel and Iron Works at Schaffhausen were added to the blacklists because of their exports, causing them to eventually curtail supply and remodel their plant.

Despite the Allied sympathy with Switzerland's position, some individuals and companies actively supported the Nazi cause for financial or ideological reasons. In particular the Swiss were, and continue to be, criticised for the way they aided the shipment of Nazi funds abroad and provided banking facilities for the concealment of looted art treasures and gold, much of it stolen from Jews. In late 1943 safes at a Swiss bank at Interlaken were rented by high-ranking Germans to store funds. Later, high-ranking Nazi officials withdrew their deposits from German banks and transferred large sums to Swiss banks and to the Swedish Consulate at Karlsruhe. Italian and Swiss press reports also stated that many leading Italians banked large sums in Swiss francs in banks in Switzerland. Swiss individuals and financial institutions also acted as third-party go-betweens for transactions by others, such as for contraband shipments of cotton to Italy from the United States via a Portuguese factory, and transactions took place in Zurich which facilitated the trade of mercury between Japan and Spain. During World War II, Zurich industrialist and armaments exporter Emil Georg Bührle began amassing one of the twentieth century's most important private collections of European art. However the collection of around 200 works, which includes medieval sculptures and masterpieces by Cézanne, Renoir and van Gogh has been mired in controversy since the war because of the unclear provenance of some pieces, leading to the return of 13 paintings to the former French-Jewish owners or their families. (On 10 February 2008 the collection was subjected to what Zurich police declared to be "the biggest ever robbery committed in Switzerland and perhaps even Europe").

US files show that there was a belief that neutrals that traded with the Axis should be threatened with post-war reprisals, but although the Americans believed that the Swiss trade with Germany justified bombing her, it was also thought that her exports should be cut down without endangering the work of the Red Cross and intelligence work underway in Switzerland. The International Committee of the Red Cross (ICRC), which was founded in 1863 in Geneva, did a great deal of invaluable humanitarian work, particularly in the worst-affected occupied territories, for example Greece. The children's section of the ICRC sent vitamins, medicine and milk products for children, and in 1944 it was awarded its second Nobel Peace Prize for its work. Switzerland also provided asylum for refugees and persecuted individuals such as Jews and foreign workers forced to work in Germany. Following the collapse of the Mussolini regime, thousands of escaped Allied POWs were given sanctuary and the crews of damaged Allied bombers (both sides regularly invaded Swiss airspace) returning from raids over Germany often put down in Swiss territory and were allowed refuge.

Despite the German trade and various measures for food self-sufficiency, Switzerland eventually used up her food stockpiles and suffered severe shortages of fuel through lapses in the German coal supply, increasingly relying on her forests and hydroelectric power. To help keep her people supplied with imports, and despite having no shoreline, the Swiss government developed its own merchant marine, acquiring several vessels that had been impounded for smuggling or withdrawal foreign flags. The ships were based in the Rhine port of Basel, which gave access to the seaport of Rotterdam, until Allied bombing of a German dam interrupted it.

=== 1942 ===
At the start of 1942 the Allies were yet to achieve a major victory. February was an important month. The Germans sank 117 ships in the Atlantic during the first two months of the year, and in Russia Hitler was about to launch a huge offensive to take the Caucasus oilfields. On 9 February Albert Speer became the new head of the German Armaments Ministry. Speer was an inspired choice by Hitler, performing better than could have been expected of him, expertly organising the resources at his disposal, ensuring the speedy repair of bomb-damaged factories and pushing productivity up month after month. On 14 February the British War Cabinet took the decision to adopt area bombing as a means of undermining civilian morale and on 22 February Air Marshal Arthur Harris was appointed head of Bomber Command. The long-awaited Lancaster bomber was at last being delivered to squadrons, along with the new navigational aid GEE.

The renewed campaign got under way in early March with a "saturation raid" by 200 RAF aircraft on the Renault truck and tank works at Boulogne-Billancourt, near Paris. 623 French people were killed, mostly workers who had gathered outside to cheer the accurate hits. This was followed by the first of a series of eight raids on Essen which proved a great disappointment. Despite an initial pathfinding force being sent to light up the target area with flares, only one bomb in 20 fell within five miles (8 km) of the town. On the night of 28–29 March the RAF used incendiaries for the first time to hit Lübeck, an old town with many combustible buildings, but although the old town suffered a firestorm, production was back to normal a week later. More disaster followed on 17 April during a daylight "precision" raid on the MAN diesel engine factory in Augsburg. There was little effect on production and, with no fighter cover, 7 of the 12 Lancaster bombers were lost, leading to a return to night bombing.

=== Thousand bomber raid ===
Heavy investment had been made in building up the bomber force, but faith in its potential was beginning to wane, and Harris realised a major propaganda success was vital to demonstrate his belief that bombers could be decisive in defeating the enemy. Harris began pushing for a mass raid using the magic number of 1,000 bombers, although in fact the RAF barely had that many. At last, using every plane available including trainee crews, the RAF raided Cologne on 30/31 May 1942 with over 1,000 bombers; although over half the city was destroyed and it was seen as a success, the city made a surprising recovery. RAF assaults on medium-sized industrial towns to the east of the Rhine, the Ruhr and Berlin from mid-1942 also did little to weaken Germany economically. From July the B-24 Liberator and Flying Fortress fleets of the United States Air Force (USAAF) took on the role of daytime precision bombing of German arms and communication targets. They began by raiding airfields and railway stations in France and the Netherlands and badly damaged the Heroya aluminium centre near Trondheim in Norway which produced synthetic cryolite, used in the manufacture of aluminium. From mid-November the RAF began a series of 16 massed night raids on Berlin, but though the damage was considerable, the raids were less effective than those on the Ruhr and Hamburg. Essen and Bremen also suffered 1,000 plane raids and upwards of 1,000 tons of bombs. In 1942 the RAF dropped 37,000 tons of bombs on German targets, probably three times the weight dropped on Britain in 1940 and early 1941.

On 21 December 1942 the USAAF attacked the Krupp plant in Essen and, although they were unsuccessful at first, demonstrated their intention to paralyse German industry by concentrating on key sectors and persevering until lasting damage was inflicted. Another important target was ball-bearing manufacture, most of which was concentrated at Schweinfurt, which in the months to come, despite the German deployment of smoke screens, mock factories, jamming devices, searchlights and flak in the area received special attention from the USAAF; Albert Speer and Erhard Milch, the Inspector-General of the Luftwaffe, realised that from this point onwards the writing was on the wall. On 25 February 1943 the Allies began a round-the-clock strategic bombing campaign in Europe, and a few days later Bomber Command began the 5-month long Battle of the Ruhr, a massive plan to wear down Germany's industrial capacity.

=== Blockade runners ===
Once new supplies of oil, rubber, and tungsten began flowing from the newly occupied Far East, mutually beneficial barter agreements were agreed whereby the Germans would acquire these vital commodities in exchange for the precision tools, blue prints and ball bearings which Japan badly needed. There had already been some trading of silk products early in the European war. Despite the 5,600 miles (9,000 km) and the land barrier of Russia separating Berlin from Tokyo, by mid-1942 a system of fast blockade runners was set up, the freighters traveling non-stop without showing lights or using their radio to avoid detection. The MEW believed that the first Japanese shipment of rubber reached Germany during the summer of 1942, having initially sailed from Indo-China to West Africa. From there it was transferred to small coastal vessels and ran the blockade to French Mediterranean ports by night. The MEW became concerned at the "steady trickle" of Japanese blockade runners reaching Europe, which one estimate put at 15 ships by the end of 1942, and on the anniversary of the German and Italian declarations of war on the US, General Tojo expressed his pleasure that Japan was able to contribute the resources captured in the South Pacific to the Axis cause.

Other blockade runners were known to be arriving at the French port of Bordeaux, 70 miles inside the Gironde Estuary on the Atlantic coast. The port, also a base for German and Italian submarines, was one of the most heavily defended waterways in Europe, protected by numerous patrol boats, searchlights, shore batteries and thousands of troops. Because of its distance from the sea, a naval excursion was impossible, while the RAF believed that a bombing raid would be far too inaccurate and costly in civilian life and aircraft. The difficulty of stopping the blockade runners became known as the "Bordeaux Problem", and eventually the British decided that a different, more espionage based approach was needed.

On 7 December 1942, Combined Operations launched one of the most famous raids of the war; Operation Frankton, better known as the 'Cockleshell Heroes' mission, in an attempt to sink the ships by sending a 12-man team of Royal Marine Commandos to paddle up the Gironde in canoes to place delayed action bombs on their exposed hulls. Although the commandos displayed exceptional courage and the expedition was essentially successful in that a number of ships were damaged, only 2 men survived, including the leader, Major Herbert Hasler, who had to make their way across 80 miles of France, Spain and Gibraltar back to safety. The remaining 10 men drowned, died of exposure or were captured and interrogated by the Germans before being executed.

In addition, excessive secrecy and a lack of communication between Whitehall departments meant that at exactly the same time that Operation Frankton was under way, and without their knowledge, the SOE were in the final stages of their own attempt to destroy the blockade runners by deploying a team of French agents led by Claude de Baissac, posing as painting contractors who planned to carry explosives onto the ships in their baggage. The explosions caused by the commando mission ruined the preparations of the SOE team, who might well have achieved a far more effective destruction of the blockade running vessels but for the Combined Operations raid.

Even so, the combined Allied air forces and navies eventually began to track down the blockade runners. In late 1942, an 8,000-ton cargo ship was caught in the Indian Ocean, where it hoisted a neutral flag and initially gave the name of a neutral vessel but misspelled the name. When the Allied warships opened fire the crew scuttled the ship, and 78 Germans were captured.

By late 1943 the Germans became so desperate for supplies of key commodities that in one incident they sent a large destroyer force out into the Bay of Biscay to protect ships bringing a cargo into Bordeaux, and lost three vessels (Z27, T25 and T26) to Allied action (Operation Stonewall). By May 1944, 15 blockade runners had been sunk and the traffic had virtually ceased apart from submarines carrying very small cargoes. The MEW stated that 45,000 tons of rubber, 1,500 tons of tungsten, 17,000 tons of tin and 25,000 tons of vegetable oils had been destroyed as well as important far-Eastern drugs such as quinine. The Ministry was also of the view that the strong blockade had probably prevented further large amounts from being transported.

=== Greek famine ===
The net of births and deaths in the Athens area during the period from 1936 to 1943 illustrates the severity of the famine.

By early 1942, the food shortages in Greece, which had been invaded by the Germans in April 1941 along with Yugoslavia, and which was now subject to the blockade, reached the famine proportions foreseen by Hoover. With its economy and infrastructure ruined by the war with Italy, Greece was compelled to pay occupation costs and to grant Germany a "war loan", and was subjected to the same confiscation of food and raw materials practiced elsewhere. Using its virtually worthless "invasion marks", more than half of Greece's already inadequate wheat production was "sold" to Germany along with livestock, clothes, dried vegetables and fruit. Potatoes were fried using Greek olive oil and shipped back to Germany, and the tomato crop was hurried to scurvy-ridden German troops in Africa. One US correspondent commented; "Germany worked like a pack of driver ants, picking Greece clean", but the corrupt, collaborationist government also controlled the black market in whatever food was still available, causing rampant inflation of the drachma, which saw the price of a loaf of bread, where available, reach $15. There were reports of grave-robbing by people desperate to find the money to feed their families, but in the towns there were none of the staple potatoes, figs, raisins or tomatoes available and it was not long before the population began to die in droves from hunger, cholera, typhoid and dysentery. In September 1941, the Greeks appealed for overseas aid, particularly from Turkey. An official declared "We are not asking for food that Turks would eat, but for food they refuse to eat."

Collecting the dead in the streets of Athens, first winter of Axis occupation, 1941–1942 (near Stadiou Av. between the Propylee and the National Library).

Despite past enmity between the two nations, Turkey quickly responded, chartering the SS Kurtulus and, after receiving permission from the British, the ship sailed from Istanbul to Piraeus on 6 October with wheat, maize, vegetables, dried fruits and medicines. Over the next few months, the ship delivered around 6,700 tons of supplies to Greece, but foundered on rocks and sank during her fifth voyage. Despite the humanitarian efforts, by late January 1942 between 1,700 and 2,000 men, women and children were dying in Athens and Piraeus each day, and Italy, which then occupied Greece, was forced to ship 10,000 tons of grain from her meagre domestic supplies, secretly to avoid unrest from her own people. This was still not enough, and eventually international pressure forced Britain to lift its blockade for the first time. In early February, Hugh Dalton of MEW told the House of Commons that Britain and America would send 8,000 tons of wheat to Greece, although there was no guarantee that the relief supplies would find their way to the starving. Dalton said; "There is no guarantee, nor would we pay any attention to one given by the Germans. We are in this case running a risk in view of the appalling conditions caused by the Germans in Greece." From that point on, the Greek Orthodox Church, through its charity efforts in the United States and the International Red Cross, were allowed to distribute sufficient supplies to the Greek people, though the total death toll from the famine was at least 70,000, probably much higher.

By late 1942, there were claims that Germany was paying for deliveries using forged US dollars and had begun to default on its Romania trade, receiving deliveries while not supplying the much-needed machinery and war materials in return. Spanish suppliers of oranges and mandarins also refused to ship deliveries until they were paid. With the gradual turn of the war, a number of neutral countries began to take a stiffer line with Germany, in some cases refusing further credit.

=== 1943 ===
1942–43 was another lean year for agriculture in France. Many fertile regions such as the Vexin, the Beauce, and the Brie suffered seriously from drought. The wheat heads were light, straw was short and hay shrivelled in the meadows, causing a lack of animal fodder. In occupied areas, the Germans confiscated 40% of the crop as soon as it became available; the authorities took 40% for the wider population, leaving the farmer with only 20%. In Normandy, Brittany and along the Channel coast, rain spoilt the potato crop and tomatoes and beans did not mature. In other provinces, e.g., Touraine and Burgundy region, the very dry weather left vegetables and even weeds cooked in the ground so people who bred rabbits for meat had to feed them with tree leaves.

South of the Loire the weather was more favourable but, with the coming threat of invasion, the Germans were intent on stripping the land so the Allies would be left with nothing and be compelled to bring everything across from England. Hermann Göring proclaimed in a speech that under the Nazi New Order, the Herrenvolk were entitled to deprive the occupied peoples of their food, and that whoever starved it would not be the Germans. Rationing remained fierce. Even with coupons, it was impossible to acquire many items. Maximum prices were fixed for everything, but the black market pushed prices 5–15 times beyond the official tariff. Cheap restaurants in big towns served dishes comprising turnip or carrot tops made without any kind of fat, and although householders still received a fair ration of rough wine, all spirits were confiscated for industrial use.

The MEW continued to receive requests for a partial relaxation of the blockade, often in the belief it would make no appreciable difference to the effect on the enemy, but the pleas were steadfastly refused. The MEW believed that any substantial or widespread relaxation of the blockade would inevitably be exploited by the enemy to his own advantage, and declared that they would "not give him that comfort".

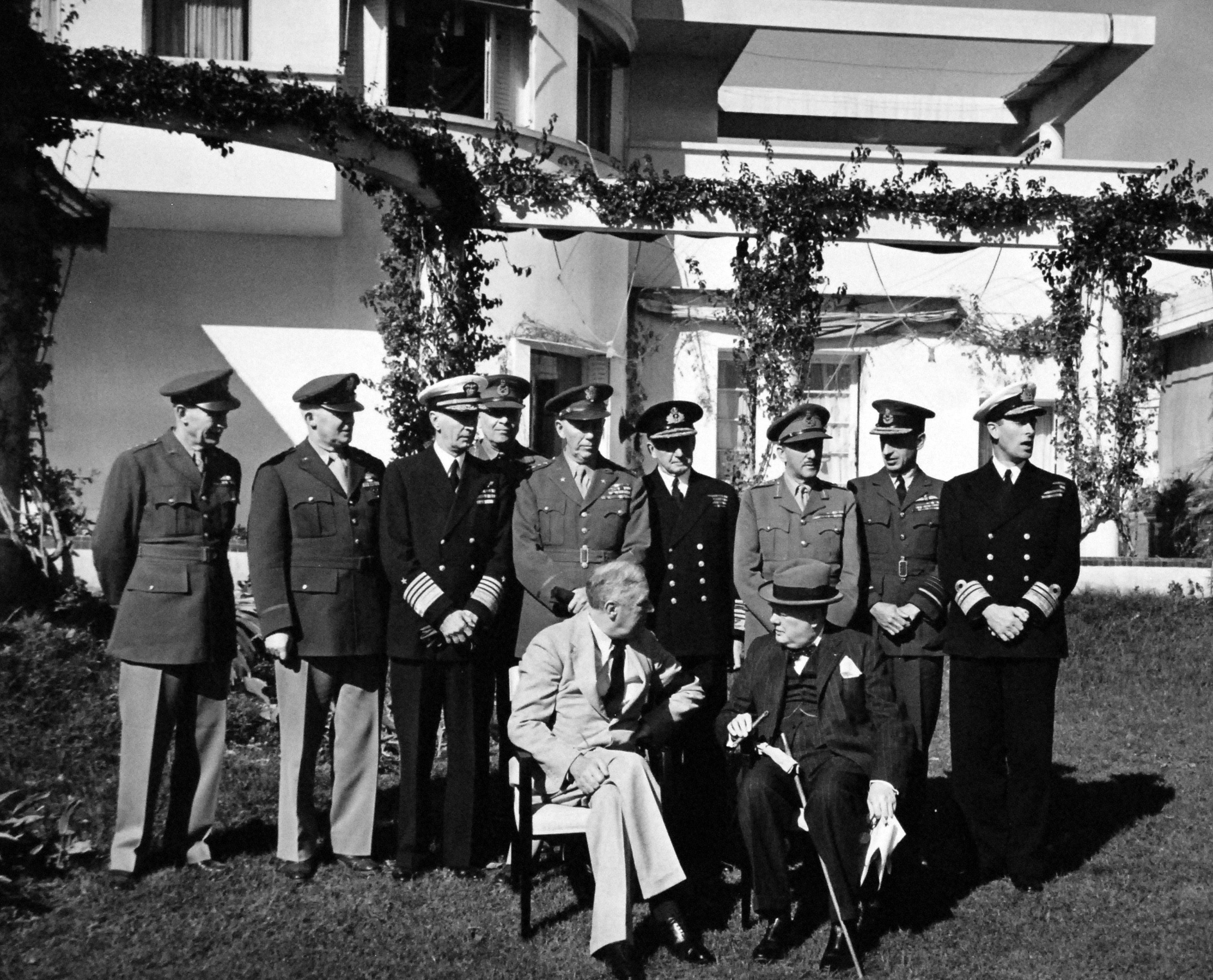
Casablanca Conference

With increasing numbers of heavy Lancaster, Stirling and Halifax bombers, which could travel long distances and carry a heavy bomb load, reaching squadrons, Allied leaders increasingly put their faith in the cumulative effect of strategic bombing, but decided at the Casablanca Conference in early 1943 that, as with the British Blitz, the early attempts to disrupt the morale of the German people by saturation bombing of cities had achieved the opposite effect. RAF raids on vehicle factories in Milan, Genoa, and Turin on 2 December 1942 only served to unite the Italian population behind the Mussolini dictatorship, and the plan was dropped in favour of the "disorganisation of German industry". Half of German synthetic oil production came from plants in the Ruhr, areas that were highly vulnerable to area attacks, and they became the primary target of Bomber Command from 1943.

== Fourth phase, 1943 to May 1945 ==
Following the German defeats at Stalingrad and El Alamein, the war began to swing decisively the Allies' way. With the appearance of more durable destroyers and new light escort carriers which could provide convoys with constant air cover, the 'Mid-Atlantic Gap', where ships could not be provided with air cover, was closed, and from mid-1943 the U-boats were all but defeated in the Battle of the Atlantic, although Contraband Control at sea still continued. German labour shortages grew so acute that Germany relied increasingly on slave labour and demanded prior claim on all available Swiss labour. The French collaborator Pierre Laval promised to send 300,000 more workmen to Germany immediately.

Sir Arthur Harris and his USAAF counterpart, Major General Ira Eaker assured Winston Churchill and Franklin Roosevelt that Germany could be bombed out of the war by the end of 1943 on the condition that nothing was allowed to reduce the forces already allocated to the bombardment of Germany. Harris was known for his sharp tongue and lack of remorse for the German civilians being killed by the raids; one of his subordinates said of him. "Oh, we love him, he's so bloody inhuman." Harris believed that the only role for land forces in Europe would be to occupy the Continent after the bombing had defeated Germany. Churchill thought that the experiment of all-out bomber attack was worth trying as long as other measures were not excluded, and while the commanders of the Allied land forces and navies doubted that bombing would defeat Germany, they agreed that the raids would be useful in weakening Germany prior to the invasion of Europe. But only 10% of bombs fell close enough to their targets to be called hits, and heavily bombed installations often had to be bombed again to knock them out. However, attacks on the already strained German railway system did seriously affect military operations – in early 1943 around 150 locomotives and many freight cars were being destroyed each month.

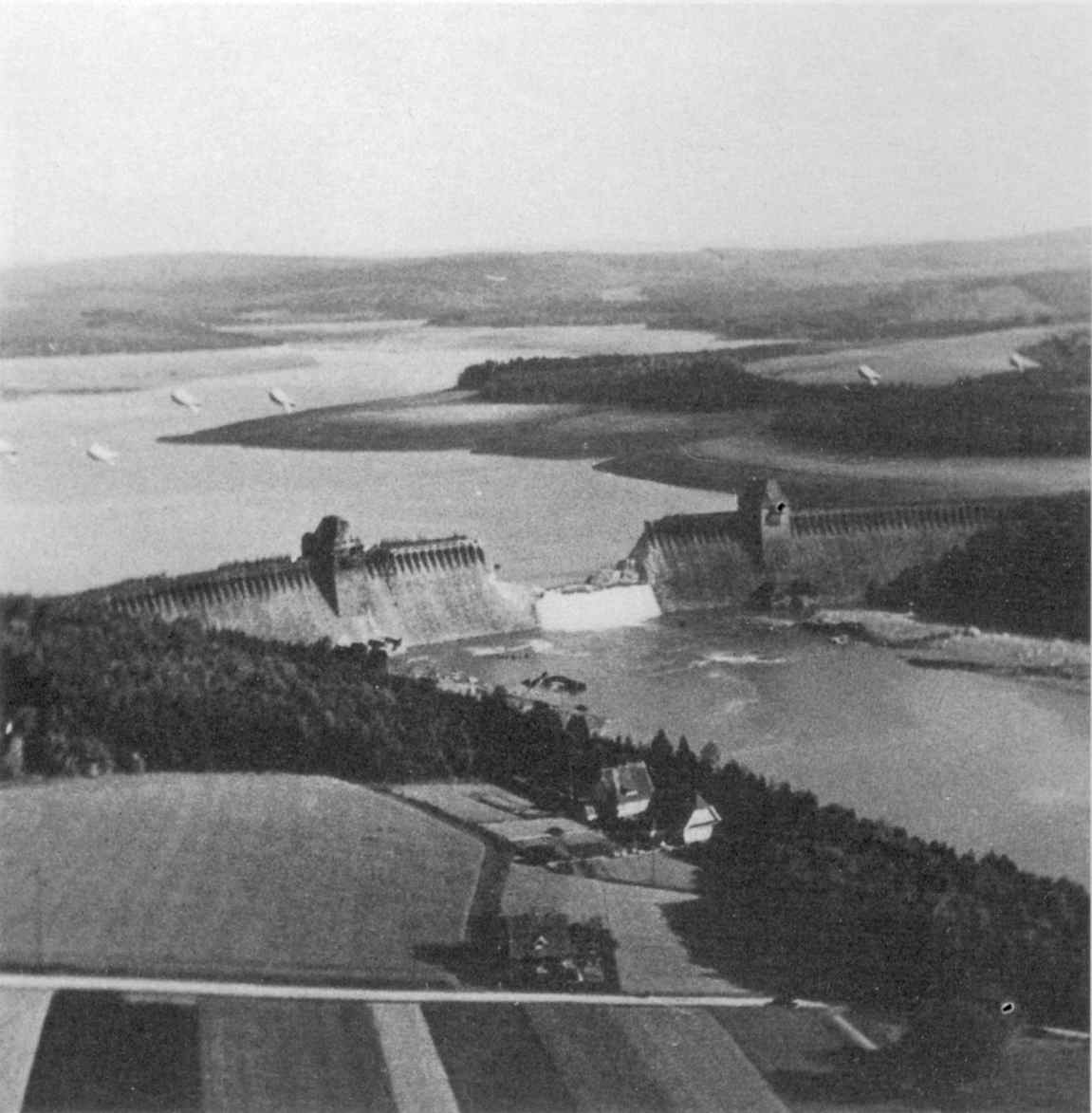
Photograph of the breached Möhne Dam.

On the night of 16–17 May 1943 the RAF carried out the famous Dambusters raid (Operation Chastise) to breach the Mohne, Eder and Sorpe dams which supplied the Ruhr industries with hydroelectric power and fresh water needed for the production of steel. The raid drowned 1,500 people and countless farm animals, but was not as successful as claimed; and half of the 18 bombers were shot down. On 24 July 1943 Hamburg, a major manufacturing centre for Tiger tanks and 88mm guns was virtually destroyed in Operation Gomorrah. Mass attacks a few days later left a large part of the city in ruins, reportedly killing 42,000 people.

In comparison with the RAF, the US 8th Air Force was at that point still small, having dropped less than a tenth the bomb tonnage on Germany as the RAF. But it was growing fast, and had begun to achieve good results. "Bomber" Harris had great faith in American manufacturing ability and believed that it would be the USAAF, not the RAF, who would eventually deliver the final decisive blows to the enemy. On 1 August the USAAF attacked the Romanian Ploiești oilfields in Operation Tidal Wave as part of the Oil Plan to wear down Axis oil supplies. No loss of production was caused, and losses were heavy: 54 out of 177 bombers were shot down. On 14 October 1943 the 8th USAAF carried out the most successful of 16 attacks on the Schweinfurt ball-bearing works but caused only a temporary setback to production and, because the bombers had fighter escort only part of the way, losses were again heavy. This forced a rethink on the self-defending bomber formation and the curtailment of daytime attacks. In November heavy damage was caused by the USAAF to the most important industrial site in Norway, the molybdenum mine at Knaben, 50 miles (80 km) from Stavanger. A Norwegian smelting works was also destroyed by British and Norwegian commandos on 21 November 1943.

=== Continued German requisitions ===
After three years of war Britain had spent £10 billion, and the Chancellor of the Exchequer, Kingsley Wood, had to ask the House of Commons to find another £1 billion to continue. USAAF airpower increased, concentrating its efforts on aircraft production and repair plants in France, the Netherlands, Belgium and Germany. By late October 1943, the MEW believed that German productivity was down 30%, and that half the drop had occurred in the previous six months, but the figures showed the limitations of all bombing, saturation or precision. Many of the installations that had previously been reported as wiped out continued to operate.

In early November the MEW published a summary of the position in the occupied lands, giving an assessment of what the Germans were believed to have appropriated from the territories they conquered in 1940 and 1941. The report estimated that more than $12,800,000,000 had been collected from the occupied territories in occupation costs and other direct charges and continued to be collected at a yearly rate of $4,800,000,000. Poland, the country most harshly treated, had suffered the confiscation of all state properties, all central stocks of textiles, food and livestock. 9,000 factories and 60,000 commercial enterprises were taken over for exploitation, and 80% of the 1942 harvest was sent to Germany. Czechoslovakia had lost its grain, its gold reserves, mines, heavy industries and important textile industry. Her total tribute was given as $1,200,000,000. Dutch industry was by now also under complete German control. State expenditures had almost trebled to pay Germany's occupation and other costs and levies. Belgium, whose government was in exile in Britain, had its entire $260,000,000 gold reserves surrendered by the Vichy regime and by the beginning of 1943 the country's entire stock of 1,500 locomotives and 75,000 trucks had been requisitioned. In Yugoslavia, all cars were seized in 1941, and any bicycles that could be found had been taken by 1942. The country had been partitioned and had suffered, like so many others from inflation caused by the occupation mark system. In Norway the Germans requisitioned personal property right down to woollen blankets, ski trousers and windproof jackets, and in Denmark all trade and industry of consequence was now controlled by Germans.

Troops had also begun seizing furniture and household goods to be shipped back for the use of bombed-out German families. Under Albert Speer, industrial factories were being relocated to Czechoslovakia on a considerable scale, and by the end of 1943, despite a lot of damage to towns – German figures showed that 6.9m people had been bombed out or evacuated – output of war material was greater than ever. In October 1943 the USAAF attacked Ploiești again, but according to German records total loss of petroleum to the end of 1943 had not exceeded 150,000 tons.

=== 1944 ===
By the beginning of 1944 it was clear that the bomber offensive had not delivered the decisive defeat that was promised, and preparations were well underway for the invasion of Europe. Spain, Portugal and Sweden came under renewed pressure to end sales of vital commodities to Germany. In January 1944 the MEW estimated that Spain was still selling Germany 100 tons of tungsten a month. The Spanish Minister for Industry and Commerce defended Spain's position, saying that Spain felt it impossible to deny Germany a commodity which had a very high value in wartime. Britain, who also made considerable purchases of Spanish tungsten, favoured a compromise that would allow Spain to maintain her German tungsten exports at the 1943 level, but the United States demanded a complete ban and the oil embargo was eventually reimposed. Spain agreed to reduce the German exports in May 1944, although the Allies discovered that she continued making clandestine shipments, transporting more than 800 tons of tungsten through to July 1944 and not finally ending the trade until the closing of the Franco-Spanish border in August 1944. Portugal also defended her right to neutral trade, fearing German reprisals such as invasion or the bombing of her cities and shipping if she ceased tungsten shipments; however the US Secretary of State Cordell Hull believed that he could have achieved the objective if he had had wholehearted British support.

=== Big Week ===
On 20 February 1944 the USAAF began Operation 'Big Week', a plan to wear down the Luftwaffe arms base to secure Allied air superiority during the invasion. For six days aircraft factories were subjected to constant pounding, with the Americans flying heavily escorted missions against airframe manufacturing and assembly plants and other targets in numerous German cities including Leipzig, Brunswick, Gotha, Regensburg, Schweinfurt, Augsburg, Stuttgart and Steyr. The RAF returned to bomb the same targets by night, and the damage was such that Milch informed Speer that the March 1944 output would be only 30–40% of February's total. Albert Speer took over aircraft production and managed to perform miracles: the installations were soon back to something like normal capacity, and overall production – including synthetic oil production – was at an all-time high and still rising. The Luftwaffe had around 40% more aircraft than it possessed a year earlier, the construction of new tanks was sufficient to equip new divisions raised for the defence of western Europe and to make good some of the losses in the east.

Although the Allies kept up the round-the-clock pressure, raiding countless lines-of-communications targets in the build-up to the invasion, they were slow to grasp what German commanders were all too aware of – that Germany had plenty of tanks and aircraft and their real achilles heel was the oil supply. In early March the USAAF raided the Erkner ball-bearing works, scoring 75 direct hits, stopping production for some time, and commenced the "Plan for Completion of Combined Bomber Offensive". The objective now became to halve Axis oil production by attacking the Ploiești oilfields and fourteen synthetic-oil plants in order to deprive Germany of the means to keep its military machines operational.

On 12 May the USAAF hit East German synthetic oil plants at Leuna, Böhlen, Zeitz and Lutzendorf; they were so badly damaged they could supply no oil for several weeks, being hit again later that month before they returned to production. Albert Speer said later that this was a decisive turning point in the war.

Meanwhile, as a result of the sustained Allied diplomatic pressure, together with the deteriorating German military position, Sweden began to reduce its trade with Germany. But a September 1943 agreement under which she agreed to end ball-bearing exports failed to include a restriction on sales of the high-quality steel used in their manufacture; this allowed the restrictions to be largely by-passed, and the agreement ultimately had little effect on the German war industry. Allied attempts to stop Turkish sales of chromium had begun to have the desired effect, however. In November 1943 Albert Speer declared that without its Turkish chromium imports, Germany's armaments manufacture would come to a halt within 10 months, and Allied threats to subject Turkey to the same economic warfare measures used against other neutrals eventually persuaded her to cease the exports to Germany by April 1944.

Though Germany, with the resources of the conquered territories was still able to produce three times as much steel as Britain, as a result of military action she was beginning to lose other sources of special metals which could not be replaced. On the eastern front, the Red Army had taken back its manganese mines at Balki, from which the Germans had been getting 200,000 of the 375,000 tons their war industry required each year. In Scandinavia, an important supply of nickel was now prevented from being delivered from Petsamo in Finland, and the mines at Knaben in Norway were no longer providing molybdenum.

=== Eve of Overlord ===
During a debate in the House of Lords about the economic war on 9 May 1944, just before D-Day, Lord Nathan told the House:

My Lords, I wish to bring to your minds an almost forgotten Ministry. Back in 1939, in the early days of the war, the Ministry of Economic Warfare was always in the headlines. Then some people thought and some people said that the war could be won by blockade alone without fighting, that Germany would suddenly collapse for lack of fuel, lack of special steels, even lack of food. In a bitter school we soon learnt differently. Even today, though Germany is extremely short of oil, she has enough for actual military operations, and her people are still reasonably well fed. But after those early days we went to the other extreme. Blockade by itself did not do the trick so we put it on one side in our minds. If the early hopes were exaggerated, we must not attenuate the actual achievements. The blockade almost certainly saved us from defeat. It quite certainly made it possible for us to win and has given us the precious time to make ready for the final blow. Some years ago an economic writer put it like this: "The blockade won't make Germany crack, but it will make her brittle." Now she is brittle, our armies can crack her. The blockade is more important now at the climax, on the eve of invasion, when the strain is telling, than ever before. The famished people of Europe must now look to the onward sweep of our advancing Armies coming as liberators and bringing bread in their train.

Lord Selbourne told the house that the effect of the blockade, which may have been slight at first, had been cumulative, and Germany's greatest lack was now in manpower. While Britain was herself importing tens of millions of tons of supplies per year, the enemy was increasingly forced to use ersatz industries. German civilian motor traffic had practically entirely gone over to producer gas, which like all ersatz materials was grossly wasteful in manpower, and this, combined with her colossal losses in the field and the need to keep a disproportionately high percentage of its available labour on the land, had produced an acute manpower crisis requiring the use of some seven million foreign slaves in Germany alone. In June 1944 the British finally secured access to the naval bases on the Azores, and the Allies thereafter threatened Portugal with economic sanctions. In turn, Portugal imposed a complete embargo on all tungsten exports to both sides, leaving Germany with only its small supply from Spain, while the Allies had alternative sources in the Far East and South America.

=== D-Day ===
As D-Day approached, the Allies prioritised attacks on Ploiești and the artificial fuel sites. German air defences could no longer protect the installations, and on 12 and 20 June the RAF attacked the Ruhr hydrogenation plants and put the eastern plants completely out of action, causing a rapid drop in production; Speer predicted disaster by September if the situation did not improve. From the beginning of Overlord on 6 June, the Allies enjoyed complete control of the skies over the beachhead, and were able to transport adequate oil across the sea via tanker and use of the PLUTO underwater pipeline, while the artificial Mulberry jetties and the capture of small harbours initially enabled them to bring enough ammunition and food supplies ashore.

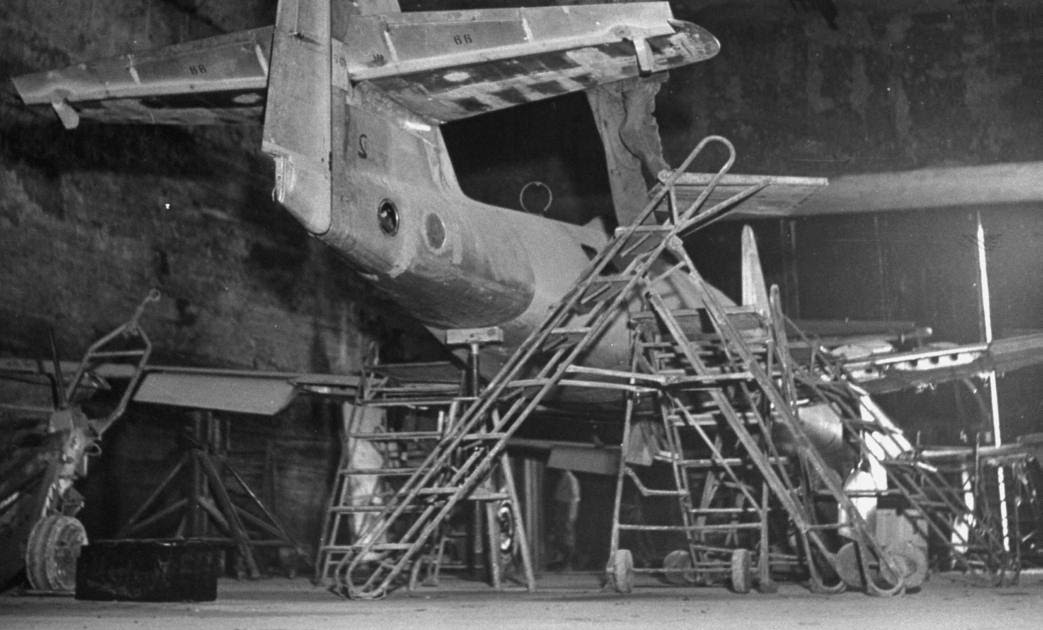
Underground factory in Walpersberg at Kahla in Thuringia for Me 262s.

The German armies defending Normandy were badly restricted by their inability to bring up adequate fuel for their tanks and could only make troop and supply movements at night. They were also forbidden by Hitler from withdrawing to better positions a few miles inland, and as a result suffered a relentless barrage of heavy calibre gunfire from British and American battleships moored offshore. German commanders increasingly put their faith in the new Messerschmitt 262 jet fighter and the V-weapons to turn the tide. The first V1 flying bomb was launched against England on 13 June 1944, and soon 120 V1s per day were being fired at London, killing large numbers of civilians. By the end of June over 2,000 V1s had been launched; 40% of bomber resources were being redirected towards 'Crossbow' targets in the hope of destroying the 70–80 launch sites north and east of the Seine.

=== Allied supply problems ===
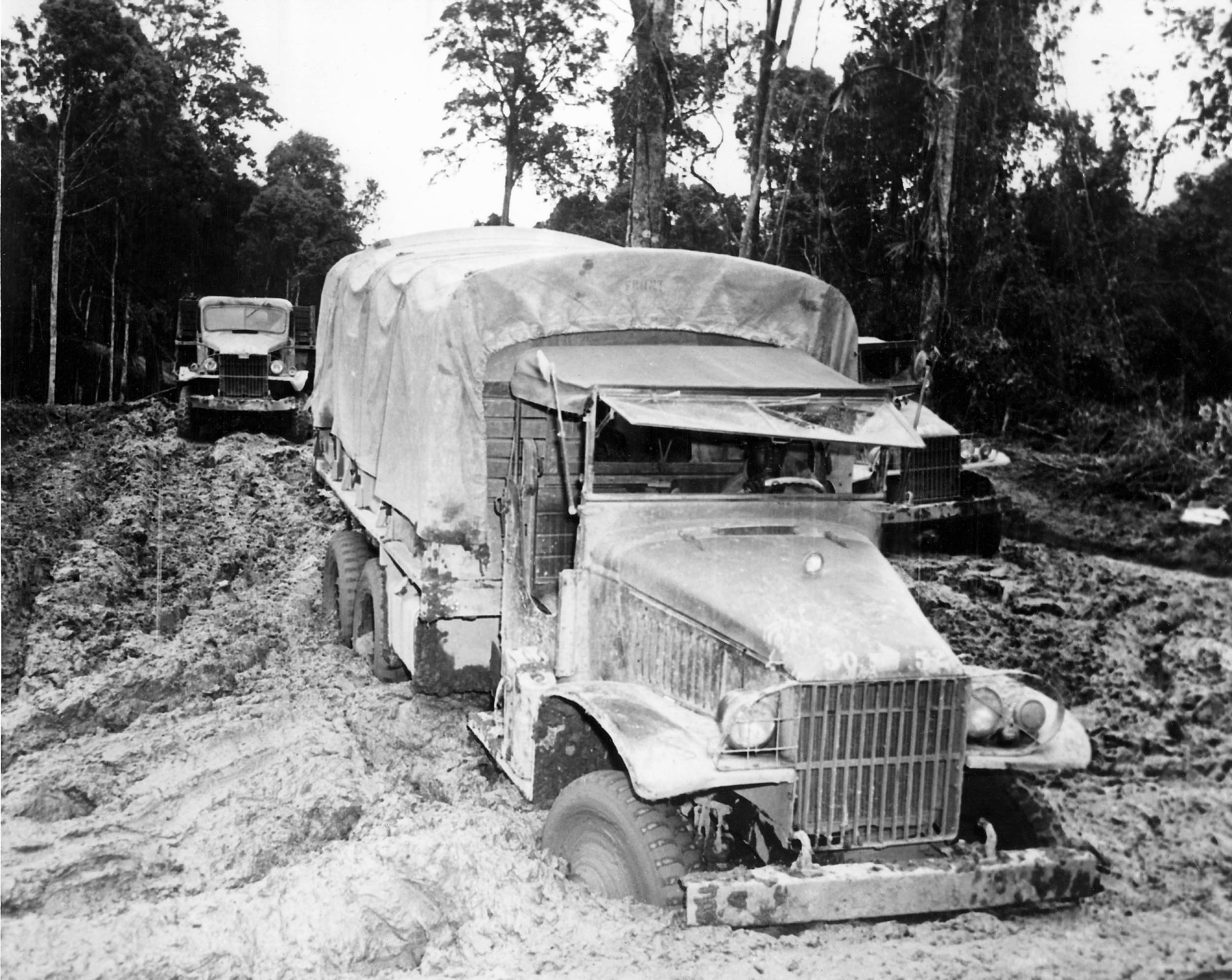
Red Ball Express – Truck in the mud.

After the initial success of D-Day and the breakout from the Normandy beachhead which followed, the advance began to slow due to the constant difficulties of keeping the vast armies supplied. The problem was not getting supplies to the continent, but getting them to forward troops, which might be 500 miles (800 km) from supply depots. Each division required 600–700 tons of supplies per day while artillery and mortars used 8 million rounds per month. The speed of advance often meant there was no time to build up an orderly logistical structure and, despite the use of a truck system called the Red Ball Express, for 5 days at the end of August virtually the entire American and British advance came to a complete halt due to a lack of fuel.

The supply problem was worsened by the Allies' failure to capture a deep-water port able to unload large ships. The Germans, employing their scorched-earth policy, destroyed all dock facilities as they withdrew from the occupied territories in order to deprive the Allies of any logistical advantages. By early September the only remaining undamaged deep-water port was Antwerp in Belgium, and the SOE, under the direction of the Ministry of Economic Warfare (MEW) was given the task of ensuring it was captured intact. The operation, known as Counterscorch, involved sending radio operators into Belgium to liaise with the resistance, keeping them informed of Allied movements and supplying them with weapons and ammunition. At the allotted moment the resistance seized the port, keeping the Germans out until the Allies arrived, and Belgium was liberated in less than a week, although the port of Antwerp itself was not fully operational and capable of landing large cargoes until after the Battle of the Scheldt in late November.

The supply problems also led to disagreements, as each commander pressed for his unit to be given priority. The supreme commander of Allied forces, U.S. General Dwight D. Eisenhower wanted to advance on a broad front to overcome the West Wall (Siegfried Line), but instead accepted British General Bernard Montgomery's Operation Market Garden, the plan to try to outflank the West Wall and drive into northern Germany to encircle the industrial Ruhr via the Netherlands. Market Garden was a disaster and did not achieve its main objective, while its few territorial gains actually stretched the supply lines even further.

=== Loss of Balkan ores ===
By early October the European military and political position had changed enormously and the MEW provided a statement of Germany's deteriorating position. As a result of military operations in Lorraine and Luxembourg, the withdrawal of Swedish ships from trade with German ports, the closing of Swedish Baltic ports to German shipping, and the loss of supplies from Spain, it was estimated that iron ore supplies had been reduced by 65% compared with 1943. In addition, about 45% of pig iron manufacturing had been lost, together with 40% of steel furnace capacity. Supplies of copper from Turkey and Spain had been cut off, and the Germans had lost contact with sources of copper ores at Bor in Yugoslavia and Outokumpu in Finland. Loss of the Yugoslavian and other Balkan mines took away the last supplies of chromium and reduced the supply of lead by approximately 40 per cent – the position being worsened by the loss of substantial amounts of scrap which were collected in France, Belgium and the Netherlands. With the loss of high-grade French deposits and the seizure by Marshal Josip Broz Tito's forces of the island fringe of Yugoslavia, Germany's total loss of bauxite was put at around 50%, while the loss of shipments of cobalt from Finland was around 80% of the total quantity with which Germany sustained that part of her synthetic oil production obtained by the Fischer-Tropsch process.

=== Dutch rail strike ===
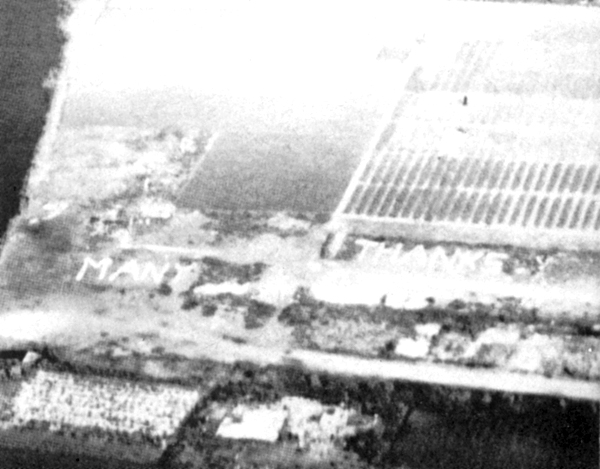
Operation Manna – Many Thanks in Tulips.

Meanwhile, in an attempt to assist the Allies in their liberation of the Netherlands, the exiled Dutch government called for a national rail strike to further disrupt German operations. The German authorities retaliated by placing an embargo on supplies of food into the western parts of the country. This caused severe hardship. By the time the embargo ended in November 1944 an unusually early and harsh winter had set in, leading to the Dutch famine of 1944. In the Balkans, the Ploiești oilfields were lost to Germany as an oil source from August 1944, and various opposing paramilitary groups and partisans united behind Marshal Tito. With Soviet help they began pushing Axis forces beyond Yugoslav borders, leading to further German losses of food and metals.

=== End of Swedish trade with Germany ===
In August 1944 Sweden determined that the danger to its merchant and naval vessels engaged in the iron ore trade to Germany had become too great, and ceased exports in exchange for permission to import some of her own stores of cotton and wool shut off by the Allied blockade. In November all Swedish trade with Germany officially ended. After six months of negotiations, Switzerland also agreed to trim by one third her $60m yearly sales of machine goods and precision instruments to Germany and to cut sales of ball bearings to 10% and ammunition to 5% of the 1942 total.

By this time, attacks on German fuel installations had been so successful that September's output was 8% that of April, and supplies were soon exhausted, just when fighter production reached its highest level. Allied air commanders next began targeting German transport networks. On 24 September the RAF breached the Dortmund–Ems Canal – an inland waterway linking the Ruhr with other areas – with Tallboy bombs, draining a six-mile (10 km) section. The enormous rail marshalling yard at Hamm was badly hit, leaving some 9,000 workers permanently engaged carrying out running repairs. On 12 November the battleship Tirpitz was sunk by RAF Tallboy bombs near Tromsø, Norway. The ship, known as the "Lonely Queen of the North" had seen little action through lack of fuel, and spent much of the war moored in a remote fjord. Around this time the RAF began reducing its attacks on synthetic oil production sites because none of the plants were now operating. Only the sites at Leuna and Polotz were still producing any oil, and though in December limited production restarted, further raids quickly put them out of action for good. Once the oil sites were bombed out in late 1944, transport became the primary target. Allied air power was now unstoppable.

In late 1944 the German army launched the Ardennes Offensive, an attempt to split the Western Allied armies, recapture Antwerp and force a negotiated peace. Despite early success, caused in part by severe Allied supply-shortages, particularly of fuel, the German operation eventually petered out. This was the last serious attempt by the German army to regain the initiative on land, although the Luftwaffe launched one final offensive with 800 aircraft against Allied airfields in Belgium, the Netherlands and France early in 1945.

=== 1945 ===
At the start of the war Germany's transport system, comprising modern autobahns, excellent railways and a complex network of interlinking canals and rivers was among the best in the world. But after autumn 1943 the connections between industrial centres made attractive bomber targets which when effectively bombed badly affected the distribution of coal, which formed the basis of most military and industrial operations. Soon large parts of Germany's remaining transport network were paralysed, and the Ruhr became economically isolated from the rest of the Reich.

Ultimately it was the sustained Allied bombing of the transport network which broke Nazi resistance. Despite his incredible efforts at continually reorganising production after each setback, from early 1945 Speer admitted defeat in the armaments battle. German industry was now unable to keep up with the high number of "Top Priority" weapons programmes, such as the production of the V weapons and calls for 3,000 Me 262 jet fighters and bombers per month. However, many factories maintained production right up to the moment Allied forces arrived at the gates.

By now the V1 and V2 launch sites were being increasingly overrun, and with the Allies moving towards the Rhine and the Soviet armies rapidly closing in from the east, large numbers of refugees began to congregate in the cities, creating utter chaos. When severe frost and snow came in January, food was declared the main priority, although Germany still maintained the ability to defend its vital installations with formidable numbers of anti-aircraft cannons. From early February 1945 railheads, marshalling yards and transport systems of over 200 small towns, such as Hildesheim and Meiningen in West Germany and Jenbach in Austria were attacked in Operation Clarion.

=== Safehaven Program ===
With the war all but won, there were increasing reports – mostly based on paranoia and hearsay – that Nazi leaders were preparing to escape justice and were already preparing the way for the next war by secreting funds in neutral nations and moving resources abroad. From late 1944 onwards there were reports that rich German and Austrian Jews were being allowed to leave the Reich after paying special taxes and surrendering all their belongings to the Nazis. In December 1944 Allied intelligence sources indicated that German firms such as Schering, IG Farben, Bosch and Mannesmann Rohrenwerke were attempting to sell patents to Swedish firms, and large chemical and electrical trusts, particularly IG Farben, were procuring foreign currency to finance Nazi activities abroad. In February 1945 food supplies were reported as being collected in the Austrian and Bavarian Alps for Nazi fortresses and underground factories, and plans were apparently under way for the structural reorganization of the Nazi Party abroad by transferring money into agents' accounts in neutral countries. The Americans had information on a Fritz Mandl, a German national resident in Argentina who in January 1945 was sent several million pesos through the State Bank of Spain to invest for Göring, Goebbels, and Himmler. By June 1945 German inventions were said to be in the safekeeping of the Swedish Aniline Company, with patents having been thrown onto the market through Swedish "dummy" intermediaries, and detailed information had been gathered on the financial backgrounds of a number of chemical, carbide and dye companies thought to be active as safe havens for Nazi property.

The US-led Safehaven Program was launched during the United Nations Conference at Bretton Woods in July 1944, the same venue that prepared the ground for the modern World Bank and International Monetary Fund (IMF). The program provided for immediate measures to prevent any disposition, transfer, or concealment of looted gold or other assets, to deny any safe haven for Nazi looted assets in neutral countries, and for the eventual return of looted artefacts to their original owners. Most neutrals were eventually persuaded to reduce and end trade with Germany.

The Swedish Government adopted tightened exchange control regulations in November 1944 and made great progress in identifying German properties and eliminating German influences from its economy. However, negotiations for the return of looted gold allegedly sent to Sweden by Germany as payment for goods dragged on for many years. Allied estimates of the value of looted gold ranged between $18.5 million and $22.7 million, but although the British, US and French agreed that Sweden's gold reserves had increased during the war, they were unable to agree how much – if any – of these rises were due to looted gold. Sweden eventually agreed to distribute more than $66 million in liquidated German assets as reparations, including a special $36 million fund at the Riksbank to forestall disease and unrest in Germany and to finance purchases essential for the German economy. It also agreed to provide more than $8 million in gold to make up for that amount of Belgian monetary gold sold to Sweden during the War, but negotiations regarding 8,600 kilograms of Dutch gold ($9.7 million) stalled when Sweden argued that the gold had been acquired before the January 1943 London Declaration on looted gold. In April 1955 the Dutch claim was finally proved conclusive, and Sweden returned about $6.8 million in gold.

Spain acquired a large quantity of gold from Germany, in some cases via Swiss intermediary companies, and negotiations coincided with Allied efforts to ostracize the Franco regime. A number of other countries also downgraded their diplomatic relations with Spain for having openly supported Hitler, and Spain agreed to return an estimated $25 million in official and semi-official German assets in October 1946. Spain agreed to liquidate some $20–23 million of private German assets on the understanding she would keep around a quarter of the proceeds, and signed an agreement in May 1946 to return $114,329 (101.6 kilograms) out of about $30 million in looted Dutch gold that the Allies had identified at the Spanish Foreign Exchange Institute. The Allies publicly acknowledged that Spain had not been aware it was looted, and later Spain returned $1.3 million in gold bars and gold coins it had seized from German State properties at the end of the War. Negotiations continued, but with the coming of the Cold War the US softened its approach and released over $64 million in assets frozen since the war, and allowed Spain to use its remaining gold as collateral for private loans.

Because of Switzerland's close financial ties with Germany, Allied representatives were especially keen to achieve Swiss co-operation. Although Swiss-German trade was generally considered to have ceased after November 1944, some companies, such as the Tavaro Munitions factory at Geneva, Switzerland, clandestinely shipped explosives to Germany, and German assets amounting to one billion francs still remained in Switzerland after November 1945. According to the U.S. Under-Secretary of State Dean Acheson, Switzerland was the last country to fully commit to the aims of Safehaven. In February 1945, an American delegation sent to Switzerland initially thought it had achieved a substantial reduction in Swiss exports to Germany and an acknowledgment of Safehaven objectives for the blocking of German assets in Switzerland. But following subsequent discussions with Reichsbank Vice President Emil Puhl, the Swiss later reneged on this agreement, and through the remainder of 1945 showed an unwillingness to embrace the Allied proposals to turn German assets in Switzerland towards the benefit of ravaged Europe and stateless victims of the Holocaust and other Nazi crimes. However, because of its excellent humanitarian record and protection of Allied POWs and other interests, the Allies ultimately decided against taking extreme measures against Switzerland.

== Post-war ==
Following the end of the war in Europe in early May 1945, large parts of the continent's infrastructure lay completely destroyed. Acute shortages of food, housing and medical supplies continued for some time and around 10 million refugees lived in temporary encampments or on the roads.

In the two emerging superpowers, the Soviet Union and the United States of America, post-war productivity rose remarkably by 1948, although for very different reasons:

- In the USSR, frenzied production of supplies for the war-effort had greatly stimulated emerging industries, further boosted in part by advanced industrial plants which the Soviets took from the Soviet occupation zone of Germany as reparations from 1945 to 1953.
- The United States had been under severe depression in 1938, with vast industrial resources lying idle and 20% of the population unemployed. Rearmament and (later) war brought these resources to life, which combined with rising investment and an intact infrastructure kept American industry buoyant, although considerable residual unemployment remained. (Much the same situation existed in Canada, whose economy was closely tied to America, and which experienced no fighting within its territory.)

The war changed the pattern of the international economy. The US emerged in a very strong bargaining-position, having managed to free up international trade to its benefit as a consequence of Lend–Lease, and forcing the British to agree to currency convertibility.

Britain's economy was badly hit by the abrupt ending of Lend-Lease a few days after the final defeat of Japan in August 1945. During the war Britain had lost many of its lucrative export-markets, and she now confronted an annual balance-of-payments deficit of £1.2 billion. As in World War I, Britain emerged from the war militarily triumphant but economically poorer (rationing did not end until 1953), and the British economist John Maynard Keynes was sent to America to negotiate a low-interest emergency loan of £3.75 billion to tide Britain over; the UK finally discharged this loan with a repayment of £45.5m (then about $83m) on 31 December 2006.

In the former Axis-occupied countries, severe inflation – caused in part by the large amount of money hoarded during the war, particularly by collaborators – led to further spiralling food-prices and to a persisting black market. A factor aggravating inflation was low productivity, caused in part by a lack of coal. France assumed that it would become entitled to large volumes of German coal from the Ruhr as war reparations, but the Americans, who kept France and other countries going with a number of short-term loans and with Marshall Aid, began to realise – correctly – that Europe needed the powerhouse German economy to restart growth and to prevent the spread of communism; thus Washington refused to agree to severe reparations, the very thing which had led to German resentment after World War I and to the rise of Hitler.

In Germany herself, the people were left to start again from almost nothing, partitioned into zones (which became East and West Germany) for many years by the Allied powers, a time sometimes referred to as Hour Zero (German: Stunde Null). Although the Germans faced a massive task, with whole cities needing rebuilding and industries requiring reorganisation for peace-time production, within a few years the West German economy achieved a miraculous turn-around, and by 1950 a Wirtschaftswunder (economic miracle) was being proclaimed. From 1951 onwards, France, West Germany, Italy and the Benelux nations began moves towards the unification of Western Europe, forming the European Coal and Steel Community (ECSC), the forerunner to the modern European Union, in 1952. The ECSC created a common market to co-ordinate the supply of critical commodities to get the wheels of European commerce moving again. An explicit aim of the ECSC and of its successors was to minimise the risk of future intra-European war, by promoting trading links and by fostering better knowledge of one another. In this, it has so far been 100% successful, with no two countries ever having waged war on one another while they were both members.

The German wartime synthetic-oil programme proved so successful and advanced that during the world fuel-crisis of the 1970s (caused by conflict and uncertainty in the Middle East) large American industrial concerns such as Dow Chemical, Union Carbide and Diamond Shamrock began to reconsider the Nazi-era technology to see if it might provide a partial solution to their problems. Some 300,000 documents relating to the history of the programme, including plant diagrams, patent descriptions, detailed reports on which catalysts and additives worked best, and monthly reports from the 25 oil-from-coal plants had fallen into American hands at the end of the war. In 1945 crude oil was readily available at $2 per barrel, a fifth of the cost of man-made oil, and there was very little interest in the German documents. They remained in boxed storage at the National Archives in Washington for the next 30 years until chemical engineers began the arduous task of collating all the information and feeding it into a computer at the federally run Oak Ridge Energy Center. Although the US managed to secure alternative non-Arabian oil supplies – mainly from Venezuela – synthetic oils are widely used today, mainly in specialised areas such as the airline industry and as lubricants.

== Media representation ==
During the early months of the war – the so-called phoney war or Sitzkrieg – the activities of the men of Contraband Control were very newsworthy and provided good morale-boosting propaganda. Along with real-life accounts of German attacks on civilian fishing trawlers, news of attempts to defeat the magnetic mine, and official statistics of the monthly totals of seized cargoes, popular titles such as War Illustrated, Picture Post and the American magazine Life served up a weekly diet of photographs and patriotic accounts of the latest British or French war successes, often with captions such as

Mr Briton'll see it through
We were victims of Nazi frightfulness
[or]
Repulse sunk? – it was only another Nazi lie

The blockade became part of people's everyday lives, and it was inevitable that this would eventually be reflected in film.

Directed by Michael Powell, written by Emeric Pressburger and starring Conrad Veidt and Valerie Hobson, Contraband (renamed Blackout in the US) was released in May 1940, just before the start of the German attack on France. In much the same style as The 39 Steps, the film centres on the fictitious port of Eastgate (filmed in Ramsgate) where Captain Anderson, a Danish merchant skipper is delayed by the men of the Contraband Control and encounters various enemy spies. It features the classic line "Stop that man and woman! His mission is deadlier than that of the enemy in the sky. Her beauty is a dangerous weapon of war!" Contraband was also Deborah Kerr's first film, though her scene as a nightclub cigarette girl did not make the final cut. An earlier silent film of the same name had been made in 1925, centred around similar events from World War I.

The Big Blockade was written and directed by Charles Frend and made by Ealing Studios in collaboration with the Ministry of Economic Welfare. It was made in 1942 in a similar episodic manner to David Lean and Noël Coward's In Which We Serve, but featuring gentle light-hearted propaganda, with a series of sketches designed to illustrate how the British blockade was gradually squeezing the life out of the Nazi war effort. The Big Blockade starred John Mills as "Tom", a member of a bomber crew over Hanover, Leslie Banks as an efficient Ministry of Economic Warfare civil servant, Robert Morley as the Nazi U-boat Captain Von Geiselbrecht, Michael Redgrave as a Russian based in Germany, and various others, such as Will Hay, Ronald Shiner, and Bernard Miles in bit parts.
