= Fjotland Municipality =

Former municipality in Vest-Agder, Norway

Fjotland Municipality Fjotland herad
- Former municipality
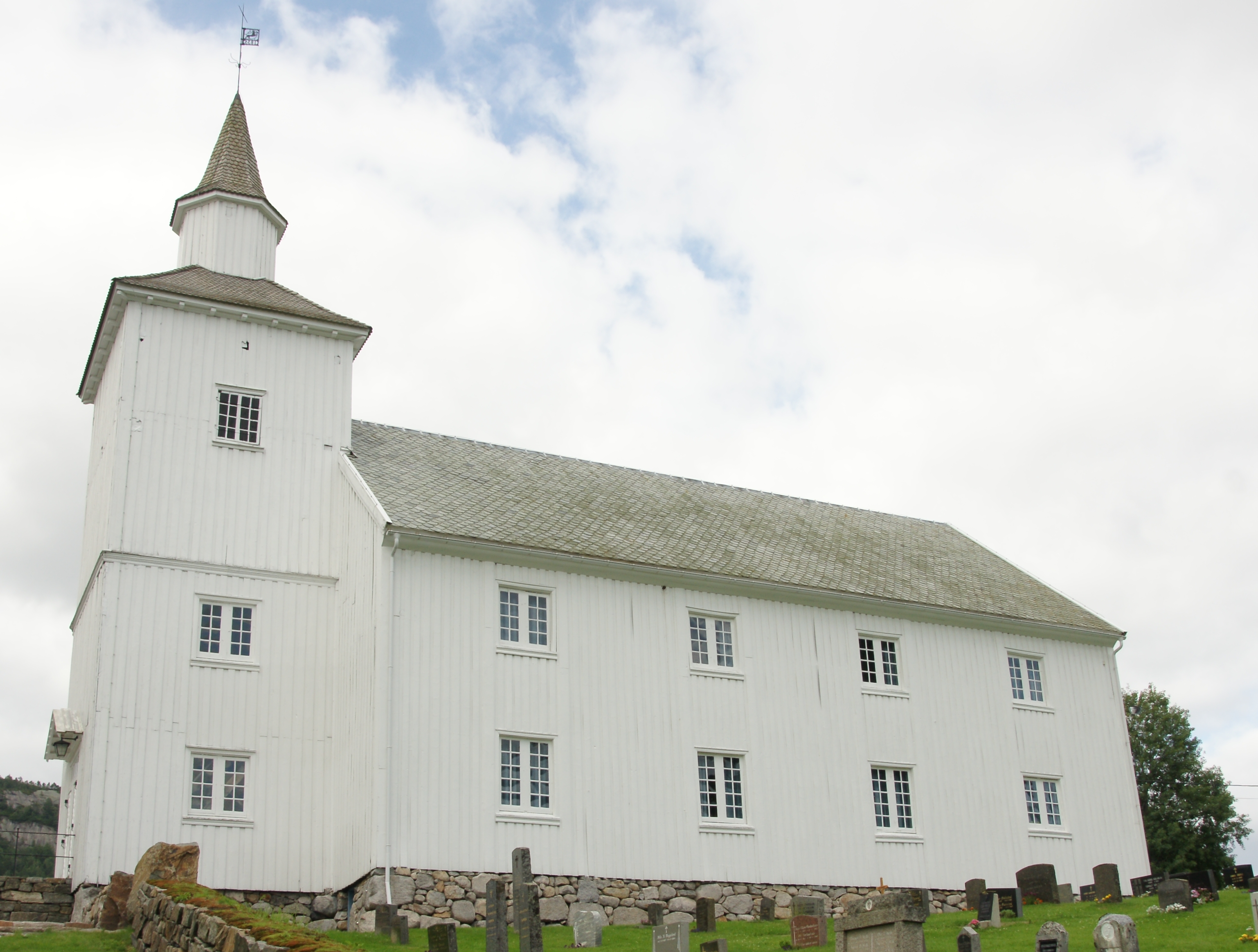
- View of the municipal church

- Vest-Agder within Norway

- Fjotland within Vest-Agder
- Coordinates: 58°31′30″N 06°59′34″E
- Country: Norway
- County: Vest-Agder
- District: Lister
- Established: 1 Jan 1838
  - Created as: Formannskapsdistrikt
- Disestablished: 1841
  - Succeeded by: Kvinesdal Municipality
- Re-established: 1 Jan 1858
  - Preceded by: Kvinesdal Municipality
- Disestablished: 1 Jan 1963
  - Succeeded by: Kvinesdal Municipality
- Administrative centre: Fjotland

Government
  - Mayor (1956–1962): Hans P. Kvinlaug

Area (upon dissolution)
  - Total: 595.9 km^{2} (230.1 sq mi)
  - Rank: #166 in Norway
- Highest elevation: 992.62 m (3,256.6 ft)

Population (1962)
  - Total: 1,219
  - Rank: #590 in Norway
  - Density: 2/km^{2} (5.2/sq mi)
  - Change (10 years): ▼ −12.4%

Official language
  - Norwegian form: Nynorsk
- Time zone: UTC+01:00 (CET)
  - Summer (DST): UTC+02:00 (CEST)
- ISO 3166 code: NO-1036

Fjotland is a former municipality in the old Vest-Agder county, Norway. The 595.9-square-kilometre (230.1 sq mi) municipality existed from 1838 until 1841 and then again from 1858 until its dissolution in 1963. The area is now part of Kvinesdal Municipality in the traditional district of Lister in Agder county. The administrative centre was the village of Fjotland where Fjotland Church is located.

Prior to its dissolution in 1963, the 595.9-square-kilometre (230.1 sq mi) municipality was the 166th largest by area out of the 705 municipalities in Norway. Fjotland Municipality was the 590th most populous municipality in Norway with a population of about 1,219. The municipality's population density was 2 inhabitants per square kilometre (5.2/sq mi) and its population had decreased by 12.4% over the previous 10-year period.

== General information ==
The parish of Fjotland was established as a municipality on 1 January 1838 (see formannskapsdistrikt law), but the municipality was short-lived. In 1841, Fjotland Municipality (population: 980) was merged into the neighboring Kvinesdal Municipality. After 17 years as part of Kvinesdal Municipality, on 1 January 1858, the Fjotland area (population: 1,044) was separated to form its own municipality once again.

On 1 January 1874, an unpopulated area of Fjotland Municipality was transferred to the neighboring Sirdal Municipality. On 1 January 1903, a small area of Sirdal Municipality (population: 63) was transferred to Fjotland Municipality.

During the 1960s, there were many municipal mergers across Norway due to the work of the Schei Committee. On 1 January 1963, Fjotland Municipality was dissolved and the following areas were merged to form a much larger Kvinesdal Municipality:

- all of Feda Municipality (population: 576)
- all of Fjotland Municipality (population: 1,244)
- all of Kvinesdal Municipality (population: 3,218)

=== Name ===
The municipality (originally the parish) is named after the old Fjotland farm (Old Norse: Fjósaland). The first element is the plural genitive case of the word fjós which means "cow barn". The last element is land which means "land" or "district".

=== Churches ===
The Church of Norway had one parish (sokn) within Fjotland Municipality. At the time of the municipal dissolution, it was part of the Fjotland prestegjeld and the Flekkefjord prosti (deanery) in the Diocese of Agder.

Churches in Fjotland Municipality
Parish (sokn)	Church name	Location of the church	Year built
Fjotland	Fjotland Church	Fjotland	1836
Fjotland	Netlandsnes Chapel	Netland	1886

== Geography ==
The municipality covered the northern part of the Kvinesdalen valley, centered around the river Kvina. The highest point in the municipality was the 992.62-metre (3,256.6 ft) tall mountain Venehei, about 8 kilometres (5.0 mi) north of the mining village of Knaben in the northern part of the municipality. Bygland Municipality was located to the north (in Aust-Agder county), Åseral Municipality was located to the northeast, Eiken Municipality was located to the southeast, Kvinesdal Municipality was located to the south, Gyland Municipality was located to the southwest, and Sirdal Municipality was located to the west.

== Government ==
While it existed, Fjotland Municipality was responsible for primary education (through 10th grade), outpatient health services, senior citizen services, welfare and other social services, zoning, economic development, and municipal roads and utilities. The municipality was governed by a municipal council of directly elected representatives. The mayor was indirectly elected by a vote of the municipal council. The municipality was under the jurisdiction of the Flekkefjord District Court and the Agder Court of Appeal.

=== Municipal council ===
The municipal council (Heradsstyre) of Fjotland Municipality was made up of representatives that were elected to four year terms. The tables below show the historical composition of the council by political party.

Fjotland heradsstyre 1959–1963
Party name (in Nynorsk)	Number of representatives
Christian Democratic Party (Kristeleg Folkeparti)	8
Centre Party (Senterpartiet)	4
Liberal Party (Venstre)	5
Total number of members:	17
Note: On 1 January 1963, Fjotland Municipality became part of Kvinesdal Municipality.

Fjotland heradsstyre 1955–1959
Party name (in Nynorsk)	Number of representatives
Labour Party (Arbeidarpartiet)	6
Christian Democratic Party (Kristeleg Folkeparti)	4
Farmers' Party (Bondepartiet)	3
Liberal Party (Venstre)	3
Local List(s) (Lokale lister)	1
Total number of members:	17

Fjotland heradsstyre 1951–1955
Party name (in Nynorsk)	Number of representatives
Labour Party (Arbeidarpartiet)	3
Christian Democratic Party (Kristeleg Folkeparti)	4
Farmers' Party (Bondepartiet)	3
Liberal Party (Venstre)	2
Local List(s) (Lokale lister)	4
Total number of members:	16

Fjotland heradsstyre 1947–1951
Party name (in Nynorsk)	Number of representatives
Labour Party (Arbeidarpartiet)	4
Christian Democratic Party (Kristeleg Folkeparti)	4
Local List(s) (Lokale lister)	8
Total number of members:	16

Fjotland heradsstyre 1945–1947
Party name (in Nynorsk)	Number of representatives
Labour Party (Arbeidarpartiet)	9
Joint list of the Liberal Party (Venstre) and the Radical People's Party (Radikale Folkepartiet)	4
Local List(s) (Lokale lister)	3
Total number of members:	16

Fjotland heradsstyre 1937–1941*
Party name (in Nynorsk)	Number of representatives
Labour Party (Arbeidarpartiet)	6
Farmers' Party (Bondepartiet)	4
Liberal Party (Venstre)	6
Total number of members:	16
Note: Due to the German occupation of Norway during World War II, no elections were held for new municipal councils until after the war ended in 1945.

=== Mayors ===
The mayor (Nynorsk: ordførar) of Fjotland Municipality was the political leader of the municipality and the chairperson of the municipal council. The following people have held this position:

- 1838–1841: Bernt Spillebrok
- (1841–1858: Fjotland was part of Kvinesdal Municipality)
- 1858–1861: Sigmund Veggeland
- 1861–1862: Rev. Ulrich Andreas Rohde Borch
- 1862–1868: Sigbjørn Helle
- 1868–1869: Rev. Wollert Konou Luther Rolfsen
- 1870–1876: Sigbjørn Helle
- 1877–1878: Olav Knaben
- 1879–1890: Sigbjørn Helle
- 1891–1904: Jakob G. Eiesland
- 1905–1912: Rev. Rasmus Høyland
- 1912–1913: Gunnuf J. Eiesland
- 1914–1916: Olav H. Lindefjell
- 1917–1919: Tønnes S. Helle
- 1920–1922: Bernt Eiesland
- 1923–1928: Sigbjørn Eiesland
- 1929–1934: Bernt Eiesland
- 1935–1940: Alv Risnes (V)
- 1941–1945: Andreas T. Mygland (NS)
- 1945–1945: Alv Risnes (V)
- 1946–1948: Einar Wirek (Ap)
- 1948–1951: Bernt Eiesland
- 1952–1955: Jørgen N. Galdal
- 1956–1962: Hans P. Kvinlaug

== See also ==
- List of former municipalities of Norway
