= Kvinesdal =

Kvinesdal may refer to:

== Places ==
- Kvinesdal Municipality, a municipality in Agder county, Norway
- Kvinesdal (valley), a valley in Agder county, Norway
- Kvinesdal Church, a church in Kvinesdal Municipality in Agder county, Norway

== Other ==
- Kvinesdal Festival, a music festival based in Kvinesdal Municipality in Agder county, Norway
- Kvinesdal IL, a sports club based in Kvinesdal Municipality in Agder county, Norway
