= Kvinlaug =

Kvinlaug is a surname. Notable people with the surname include:

- Per Sverre Kvinlaug (born 1974), Norwegian politician
- Torvald Kvinlaug (1911–1997), Norwegian politician
