= Fjotland =

Village in Kvinesdal Municipality, Norway

- Village
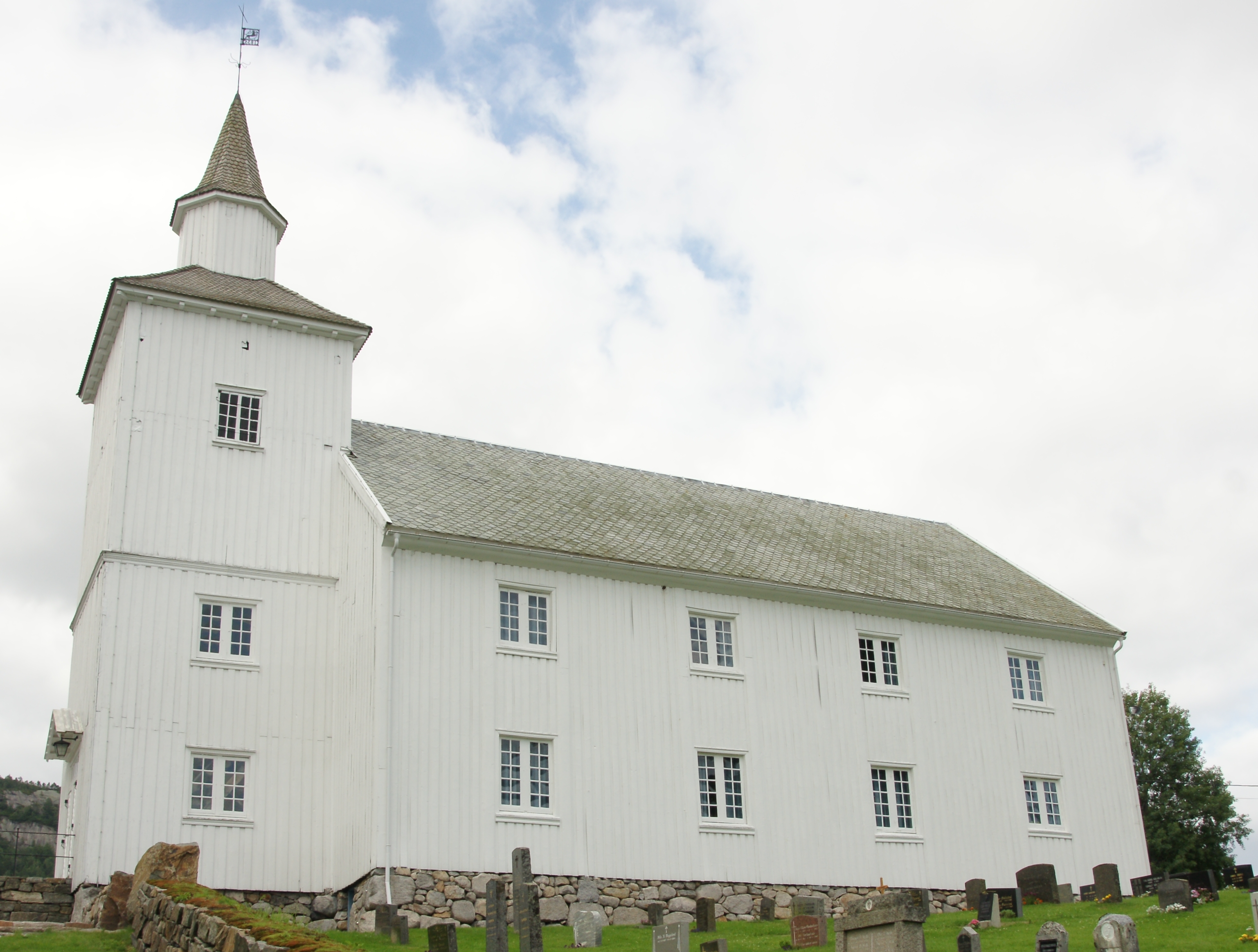
- View of the village church
- Interactive map of Fjotland
- Coordinates: 58.52642°N 6.99208°E
- Country: Norway
- Region: Southern Norway
- County: Agder
- District: Lister
- Municipality: Kvinesdal Municipality
- Elevation: 331 m (1,086 ft)
- Time zone: UTC+01:00 (CET)
  - Summer (DST): UTC+02:00 (CEST)
- Post Code: 4480 Kvinesdal

Fjotland is a village in Kvinesdal Municipality in Agder county, Norway. The village is located in the northern part of the Kvinesdalen valley on the northeast side of the lake Fjotlandsvatnet. The village of Fjotland is about 17 kilometres (11 mi) southeast of the village of Haughom in Sirdal Municipality and about 25 kilometres (16 mi) north of the village of Liknes. Fjotland Church is located in the village.

== History ==
The village of Fjotland was the administrative centre of the old Fjotland Municipality which existed prior to 1963.

=== Name ===
The name of the municipality (originally the parish) comes from the old Fjotland farm (Old Norse: Fjósaland). The first element in the name comes from the word fjøs which means "barn" and the last element in the name comes from the word land which means "land".
