= Knaben =

Village in Kvinesdal Municipality, Norway

- Village
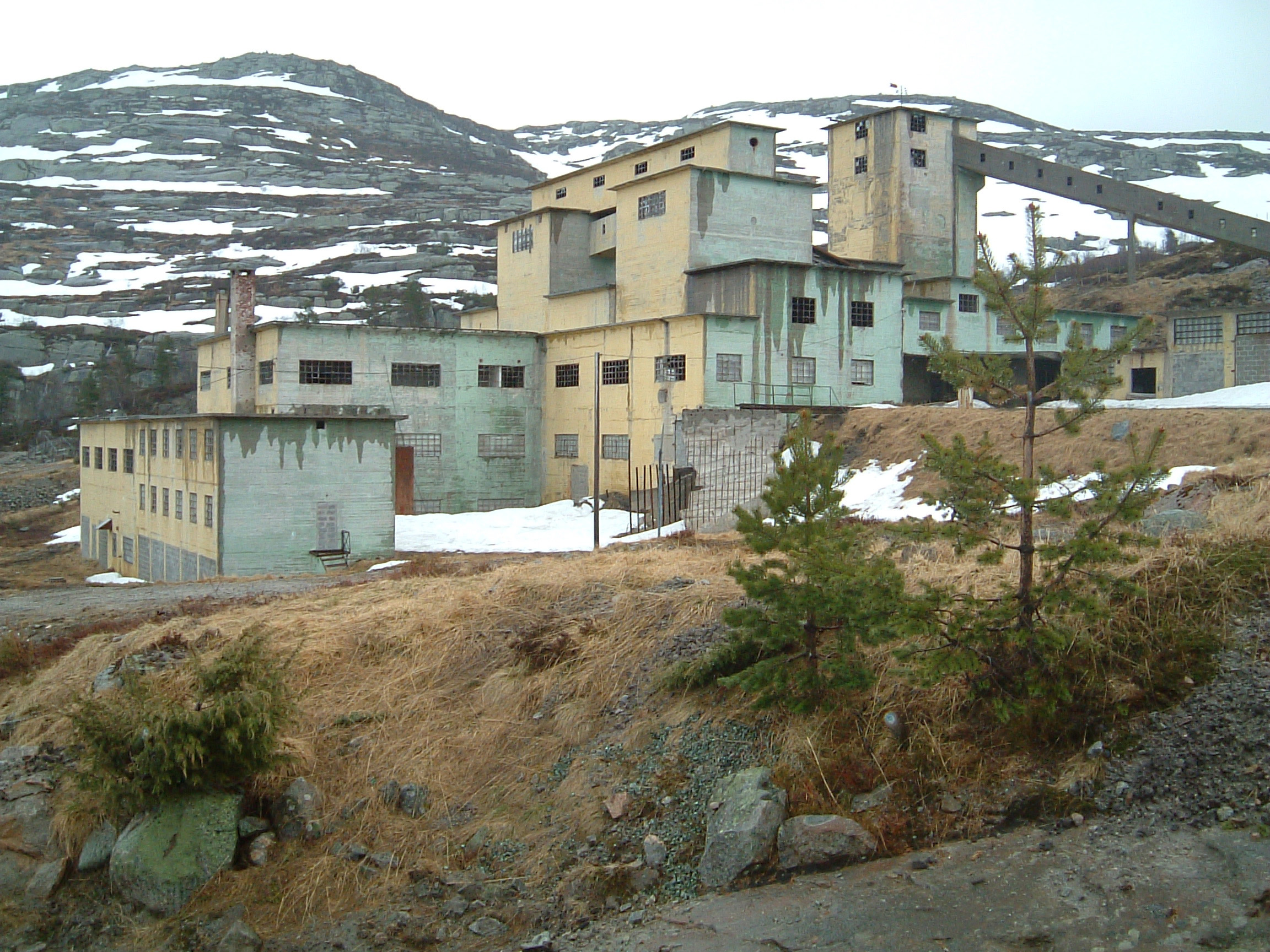
- View of the village mill, wash mill and hoist
- Interactive map of Knaben
- Coordinates: 58.66549°N 7.0665°E
- Country: Norway
- Region: Southern Norway
- County: Agder
- District: Lister
- Municipality: Kvinesdal Municipality
- Elevation: 610 m (2,000 ft)
- Time zone: UTC+01:00 (CET)
  - Summer (DST): UTC+02:00 (CEST)
- Post Code: 4473 Kvinlog

Knaben is an old mining village in the northern part of Kvinesdal Municipality in Agder county, Norway. Currently, the mine is no longer in use, but the area has become a popular ski resort. The village lies at an elevation of 630 metres (2,070 ft) above sea level, about 50 kilometres (31 mi) north of Liknes and about 20 kilometres (12 mi) east of Tonstad in Sirdal Municipality. The molybdenum mines were operated here from 1885 to 1973. Constructions and buildings are still mostly standing. The homes where the workers once lived are now hotels.

== Nature ==
The Knaben uplands (Knabeheiene) are mainly located at an elevation of between 750 and 850 metres (2,460 and 2,790 ft) above sea level. The area has a rich bird-life and animal life, with moose, reindeer, black grouse, lagopus, falcon, and eagle.

== History ==
=== Mining activity ===
Occurrence of molybdenite was the basis for the mining activities at Knaben. In 1897, it was determined that tempering of steel with molybdenum resulted in an alloy with qualities favourable for weapon production. In 1902, the mining rights of the area were bought for 6,000 kr, and subsequently sold to an English company in 1904 for 250,000 kr. Due to low molybdenum prices the mining operations ceased in 1909. World War I led to an uprise at Knaben. At its height ten different mining companies had operations in the area, but all operations ceased when the war was over. The Swedish company Avesta Järnverks AB took over from A/S Knaben Molybdængruber, and the production increased through the 1930s, with about 400 mine workers and a total population at Knaben of about 700.

=== Second World War ===
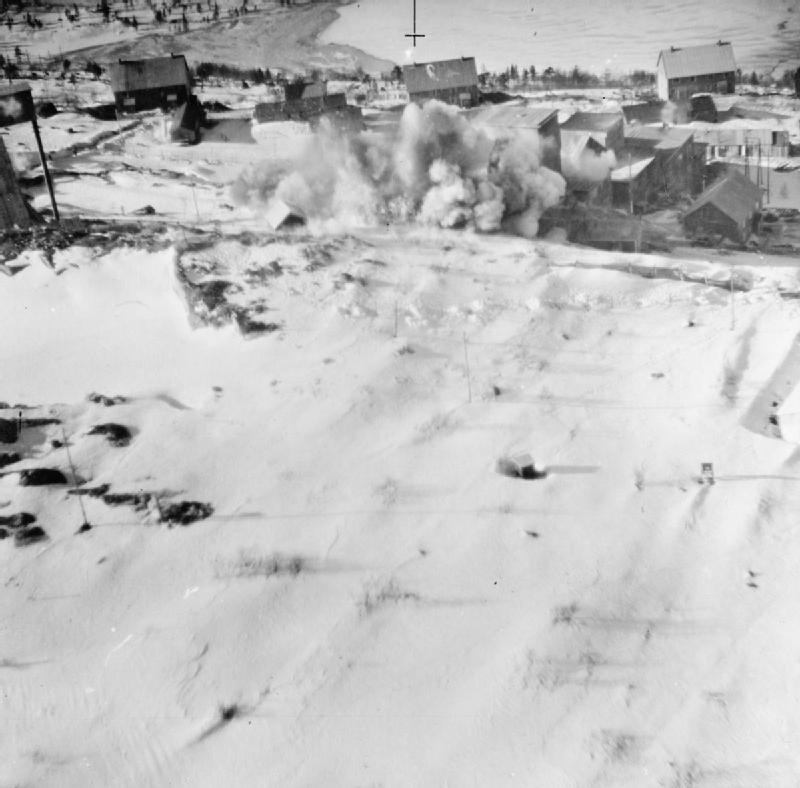
Mosquito fighter bombers attacking the washing plant at Knaben.

At the time Norway was invaded in 1940, during World War II, the Knaben mines were one of the few molybdenum mines in Europe still in operation. The occupying German forces stationed about 1,000 men in the area, and established gun sites for anti-aircraft guns. The mine operations were the target for allied bombing twice in 1943. The first attack took place on 3 March, with 10 British de Havilland Mosquito strike fighters of No. 139 Squadron RAF participating, ending 16 people. The second attack was on 16 November, when 130 American B-17 bombers from the Eighth Air Force attacked the Knaben molybdenum mines in a raid against Norway.

=== Post-war ===
The school at Knaben was built in 1954. In 1973, the mining company announced it would cease operations. The mines were finally closed on 30 April 1973, and the village was more or less abandoned. A museum, Knaben Gruvemuseum has been established in the old administration building, and is run by Knabens Venner and Kvinesdal municipality. Norsk Bergverksmuseum is running a pilot project at the Knaben mining community.

A large sand deposit in the valley is a visible result from 88 years of mining activity. The percentage of molybdenum was low, on average below 0.2%. The sand deposits cause some leaching of metals (cadmium, copper and molybdenum), and flotation of chemicals into the river Kvina.

Today, tourism is the main activity at Knaben. There is an alpine ski resort in operation, and several mountain cabin resorts. The ski resort operates three different pistes of around 1,000m (3,280 ft) each, with an elevation of 182 m (597 ft).

== Media gallery ==
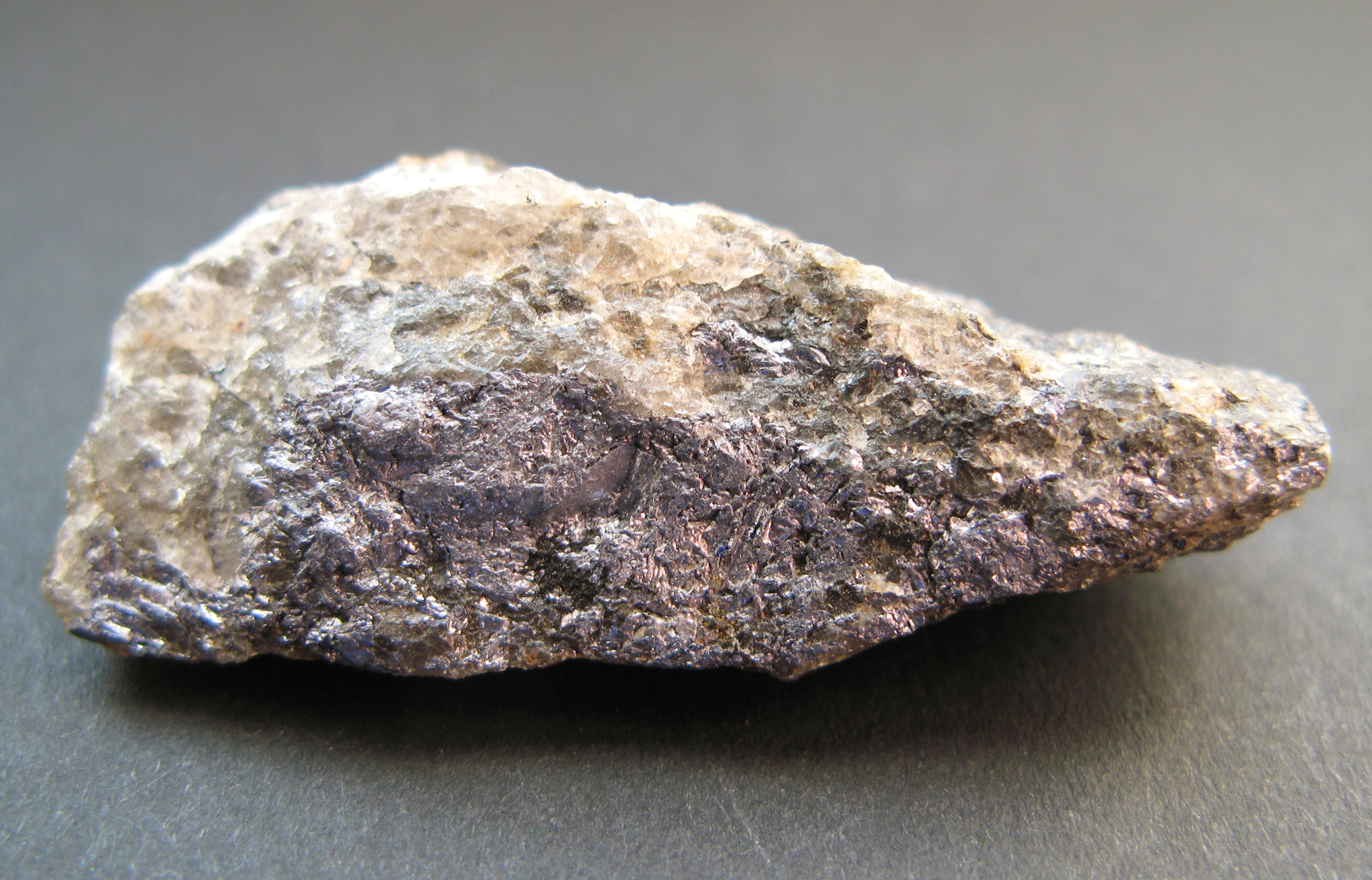
Molybdenite from the mine

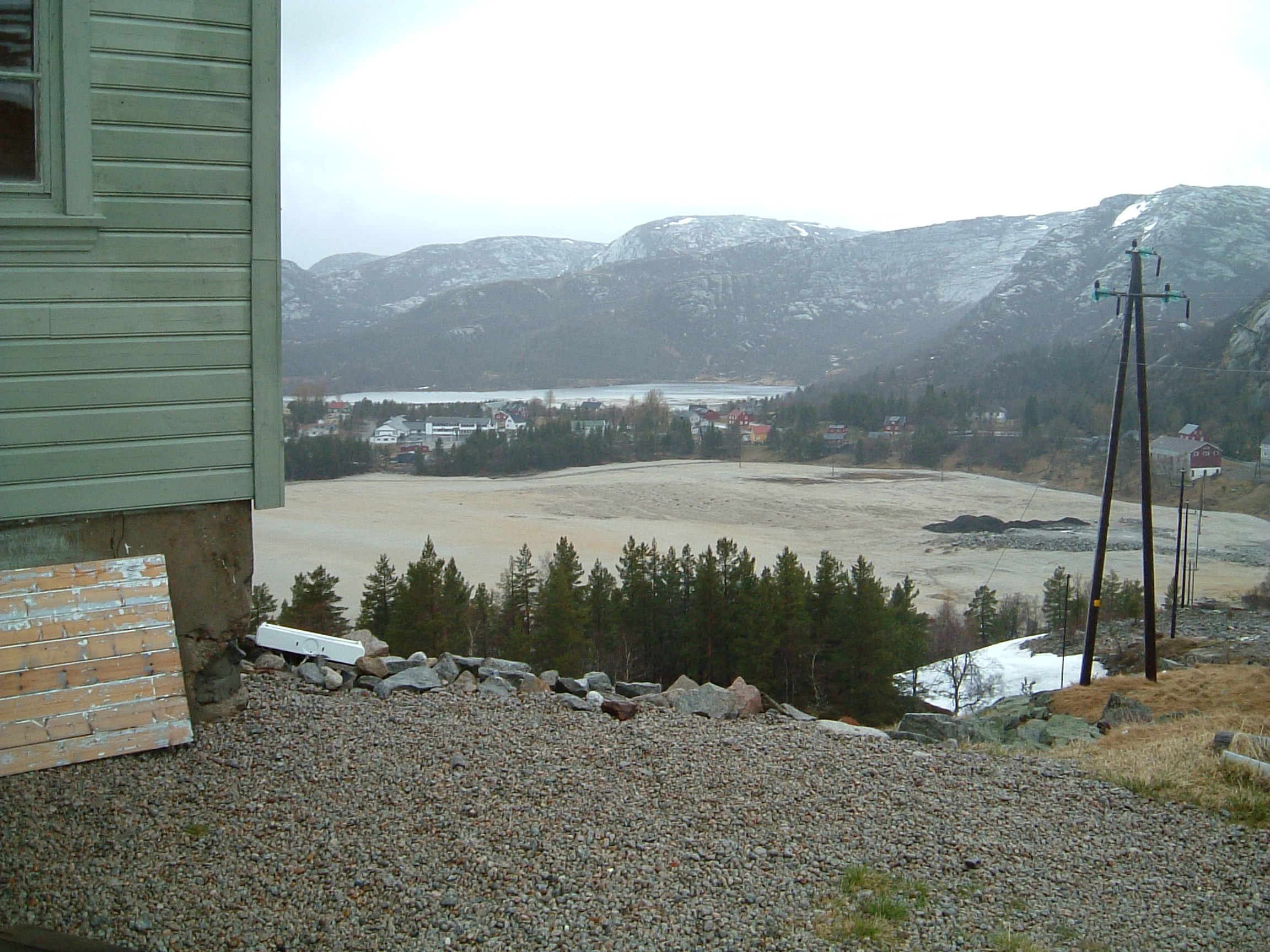
Sand deposits at Knaben

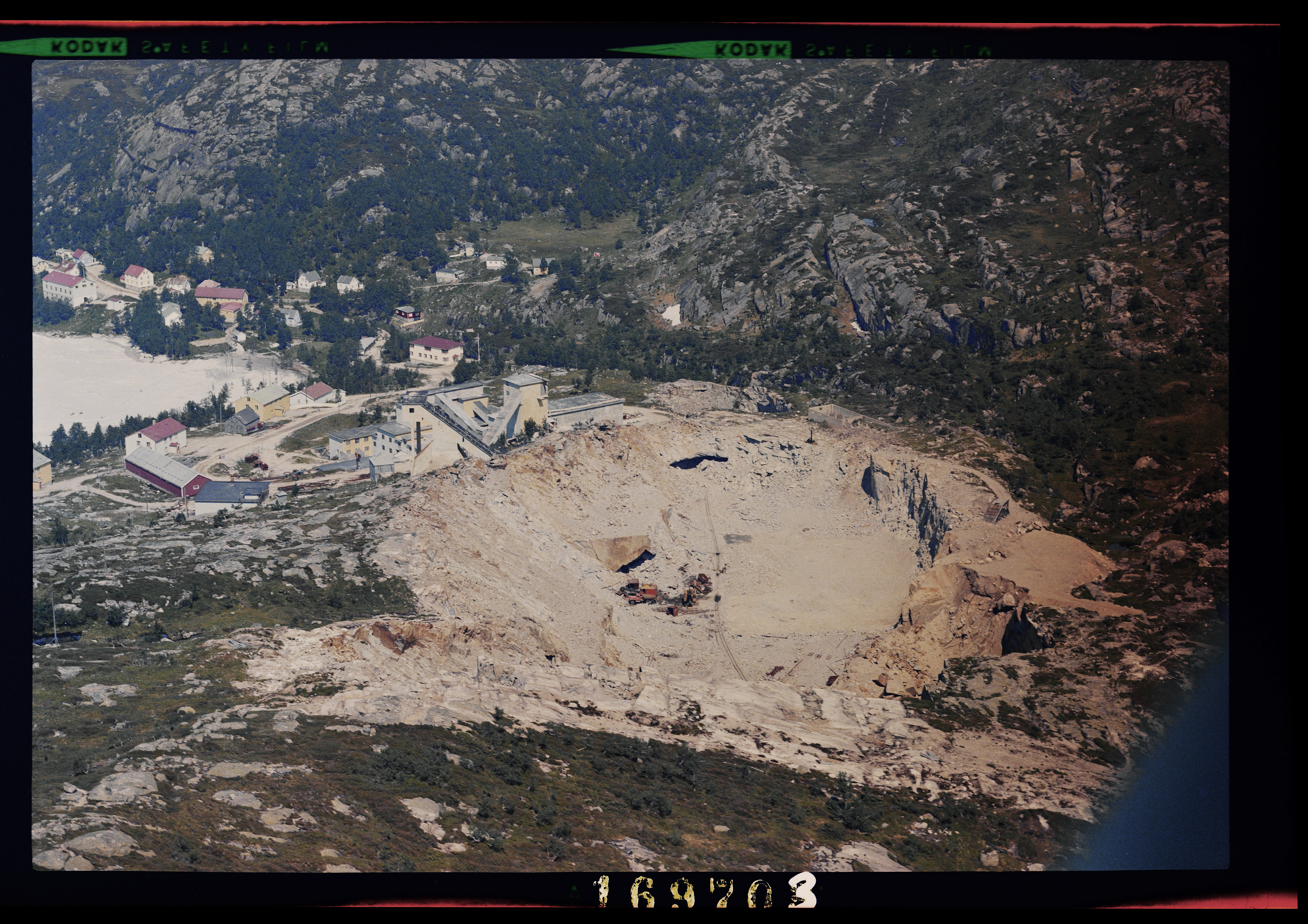
View of the mine buildings

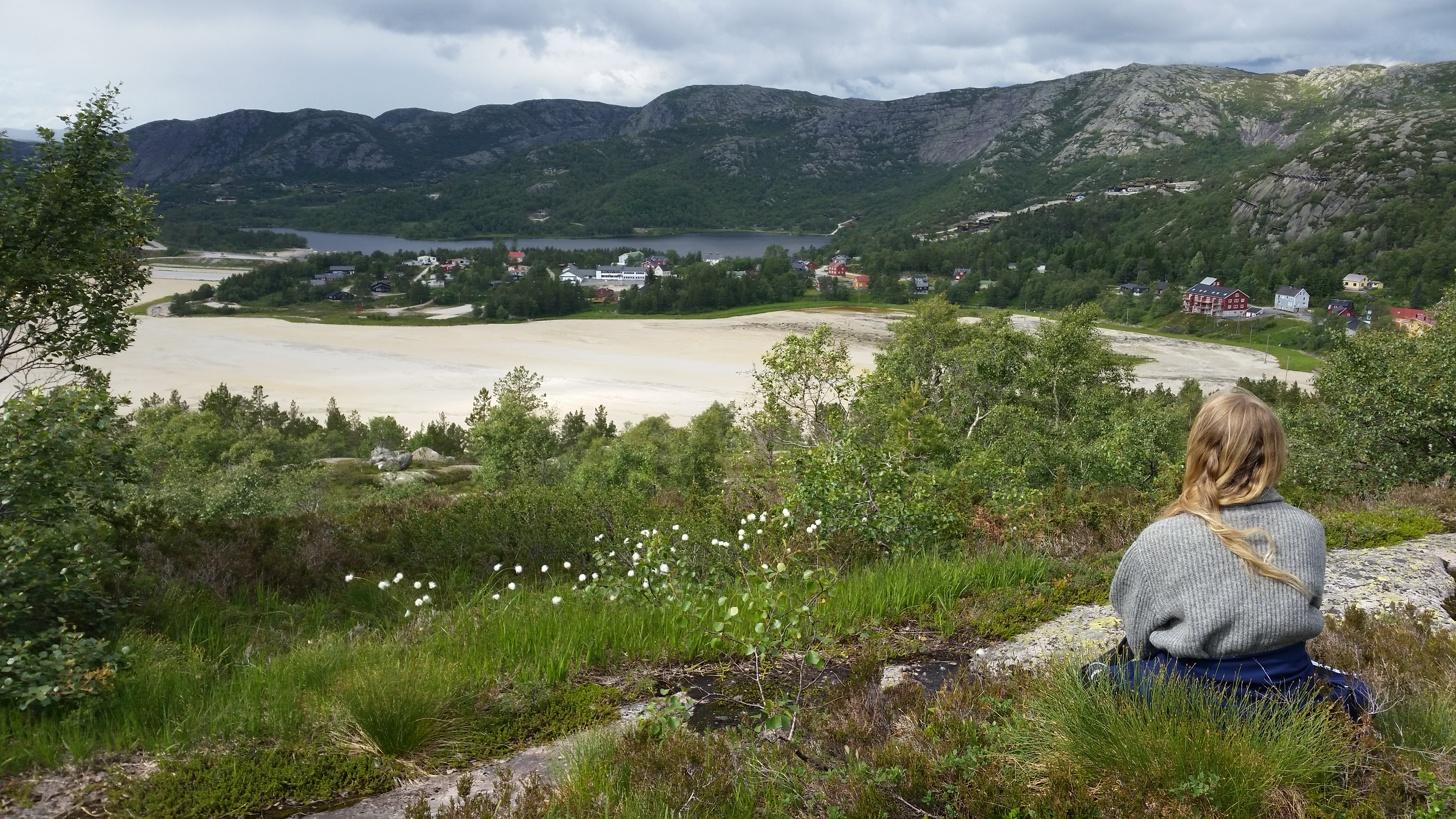
View of the village and sand deposits
