= Kvifjorden =

Lake in Agder, Norway

- Interactive map of Kvifjorden
- Location: Agder, Norway
- Coordinates: 58.84718°N 7.07761°E
- Primary inflows: Kvina river
- Primary outflows: Kvina river
- Basin countries: Norway
- Max. length: 12 kilometres (7.5 mi)
- Max. width: 4 kilometres (2.5 mi)
- Surface area: 15.87 km^{2} (6.13 sq mi)
- Shore length^{1}: 71.94 kilometres (44.70 mi)
- Surface elevation: 715 metres (2,346 ft)
- References: NVE
- ^{1} Shore length is not a well-defined measure.

Kvifjorden is a lake in Agder county, Norway. THe lake straddles the borders of the municipalities of Bygland, Kvinesdal, and Sirdal. The lake was created when a dam was built along the Kvina river.

The lake is located about 27 kilometres (17 mi) northeast of the village of Tonstad and about 47 kilometres (29 mi) northwest of the village of Byglandsfjord.

== See also ==
- List of lakes in Aust-Agder
- List of lakes in Norway
