= Netlandsnes Chapel =

Church in Agder, Norway

- Netlandsnes kapell
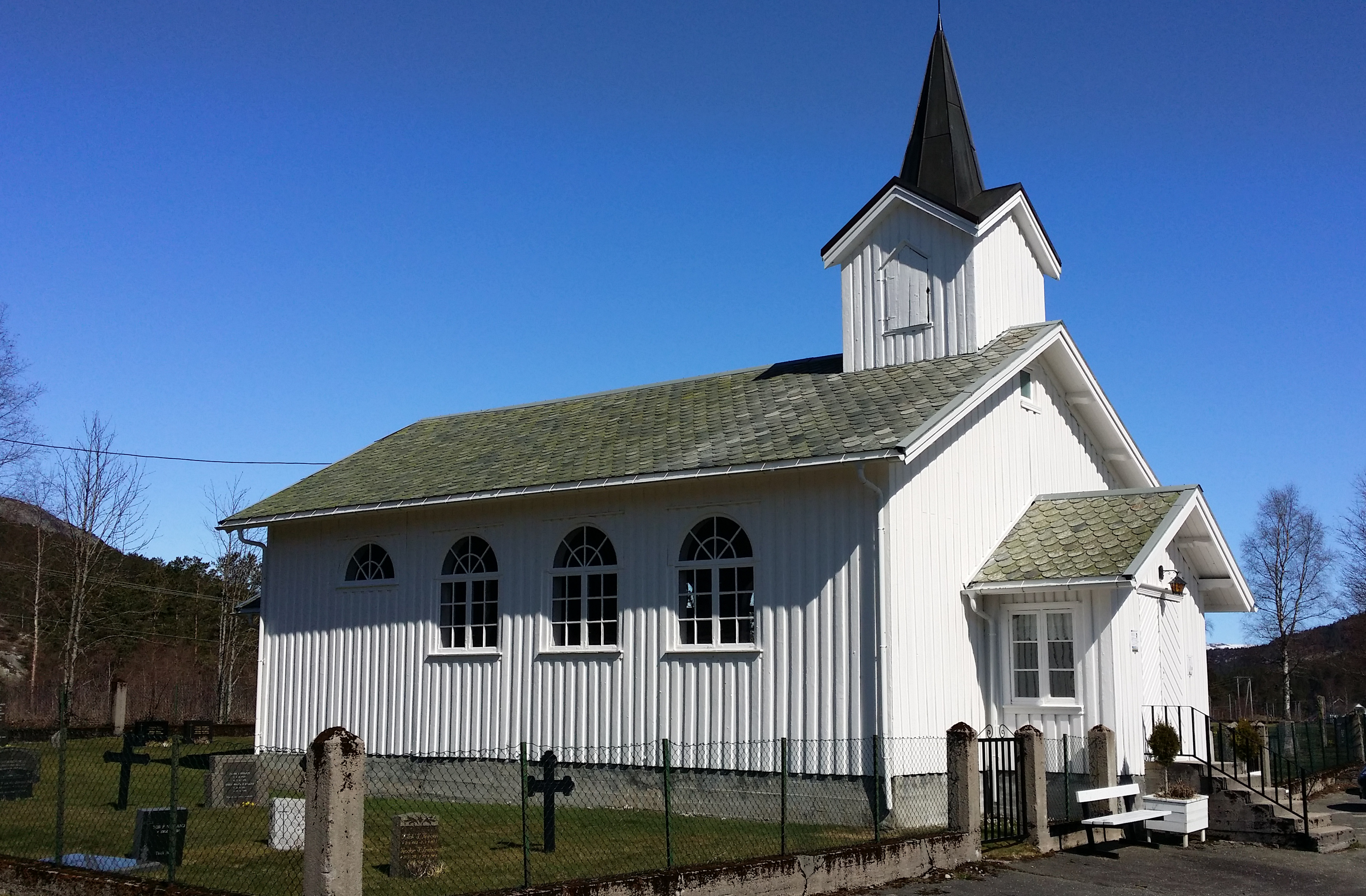
- View of the church
- Netlandsnes Chapel
- 58.6252°N 06.9175°E
- Location: Kvinesdal Municipality, Agder
- Country: Norway
- Denomination: Church of Norway
- Churchmanship: Evangelical Lutheran

History
- Status: Parish church
- Founded: 1886
- Consecrated: 1886

Architecture
- Functional status: Active
- Architect: H. A. Fedde
- Architectural type: Long church
- Completed: 1886; 140 years ago

Specifications
- Capacity: 100
- Materials: Wood

Administration
- Diocese: Agder og Telemark
- Deanery: Lister og Mandal prosti
- Parish: Fjotland
- Norwegian Cultural Heritage Site
- Type: Church
- Status: Not protected
- ID: 85126

Netlandsnes Chapel (Norwegian: Netlandsnes kapell) is a parish church of the Church of Norway in Kvinesdal Municipality in Agder county, Norway. It is located in the village of Netland along the river Kvina, about 20 kilometres (12 mi) northwest of Fjotland. It is one of the two churches for the Fjotland parish which is part of the Lister og Mandal prosti (deanery) in the Diocese of Agder og Telemark. The white, wooden church was built in a long church design in 1886 using plans drawn up by the architect H.A. Fedde. The church seats about 100 people.

== See also ==
- List of churches in Agder og Telemark
