= Torvald Kvinlaug =

Norwegian politician

Torvald Kvinlaug (13 July 1911 – 1 July 1997) was a Norwegian politician for the Christian Democratic Party.

== Biography ==
He was born in Liknes. He served as a deputy representative to the Norwegian Parliament from Vest-Agder during the terms 1961–1965, 1965–1969 and 1969–1973.

On the local level, he was a member of the municipal council of Kvinesdal Municipality from 1947 to 1971, serving as deputy mayor from 1961 to 1963. Following the 1975 elections, Faye became the first elected county mayor (fylkesordfører) of Vest-Agder county. In 1979 he was succeeded by Niels-Otto Hægland from the same party.

Political offices
New office	County mayor of Vest-Agder; 1975–1979	Succeeded by Niels-Otto Hægland
