= Andreas Hompland =

- Born: 18 September 1946 (age 79); Kvinesdal Municipality, Norway
- Occupations: Social scientist, journalist, writer

Andreas Hompland (born 18 September 1946 in Kvinesdal) is a Norwegian social scientist, journalist, magazine editor and non-fiction writer.

Hompland is particularly known for his column Sideblikk, published in the newspaper Dagbladet since 1980. Among his books are Sideblikk på maktmenneske frå Alta til Bergen of 1982, Dynastiet Willoch of 1983, and Trender i arbeidslivet (1999, co-written with K. A. Larsen). He edited the periodical Plan og arbeid from 1984 to 1985, and the periodical Plan from 1994 to 1999.
