= Peder Jacobsen Bøgvald =

Norwegian politician

Peder Jacobsen Bøgvald (1762 – 16 November 1829) was a Norwegian sea captain, farmer and politician.

Bøgvald was born on the Sande farm in the Feda parish of Kvinesdal in Lister og Mandal county, Norway. He had left the district at a young age to work at sea. Many years later he returned to Feda, having worked himself upwards as a shipmaster in the Netherlands.

He was elected to the Norwegian Parliament for its first session in 1814, and was re-elected in 1815. Together with Teis Lundegaard, he represented the rural constituency of Lister og Mandals Amt.
