= Erling Moi =

Norwegian resistance member (1918–1944)

Erling August Moi
- Born: June 30, 1918; Kvinesdal Municipality, Norway
- Died: September 8, 1944 (aged 26)
- Military career
- Allegiance: Norway
- Unit: Norwegian resistance

Erling August Moi (30 June 1918 – 8 September 1944) was a Norwegian resistance member of World War II.

He was born and raised in Kvinesdal Municipality, and had attended middle school and commercial school. During the Norwegian Campaign in 1940, he fought for Norway in Voss and Valdres. During the subsequent occupation of Norway by Nazi Germany, he joined Milorg in 1941. He worked as a courier between Southern Norway and Oslo, and also operated an illegal communication post in Kvinesdal Municipality. He was arrested on 30 March 1944, when the Gestapo raided the home of fellow resistance member Sverre Johansen. Moi coincidentally slept over in Johansen's house, but together with Sverre's brother Toralf he was arrested by chance.

He was imprisoned at Arkivet in Kristiansand before being moved to Grini concentration camp in June 1944. On 6 September 1944 he was to be transported to Germany, and brought on board SS Westfalen. However, the ship sank on 8 September, and Moi perished. He was given a grave in Kvinesdal.
