= Odd Omland =

Norwegian politician (born 1956)

Odd Omland (born 29 January 1956) is a Norwegian politician for the Labour Party. He is a Member of Parliament (Stortinget) for Vest-Agder County since 2013 where he is a member of the Standing Committee on Business and Industry.

Omland was mayor of Kvinesdal Municipality from 2003 to 2013. In local elections in 2007, he was re-elected with over 67% of the votes in the direct mayor election in the municipality where he has been municipal representative since 1980. At the 2009 general election was the Council for Labour's second candidate from Vest-Agder, and he thus became the party's first deputy.
