= Tønnes Oksefjell =

Norwegian politician

Tønnes Oksefjell (10 April 1901 – 19 May 1976) was a Norwegian politician for the Liberal Party.

He served as a deputy representative to the Norwegian Parliament from Vest-Agder during the term 1945–1949. He was also the mayor of Kvinesdal Municipality from 1948 until his retirement in 1971.
