= Kvinesdal Church =

Church in Agder, Norway

- Kvinesdal kirke
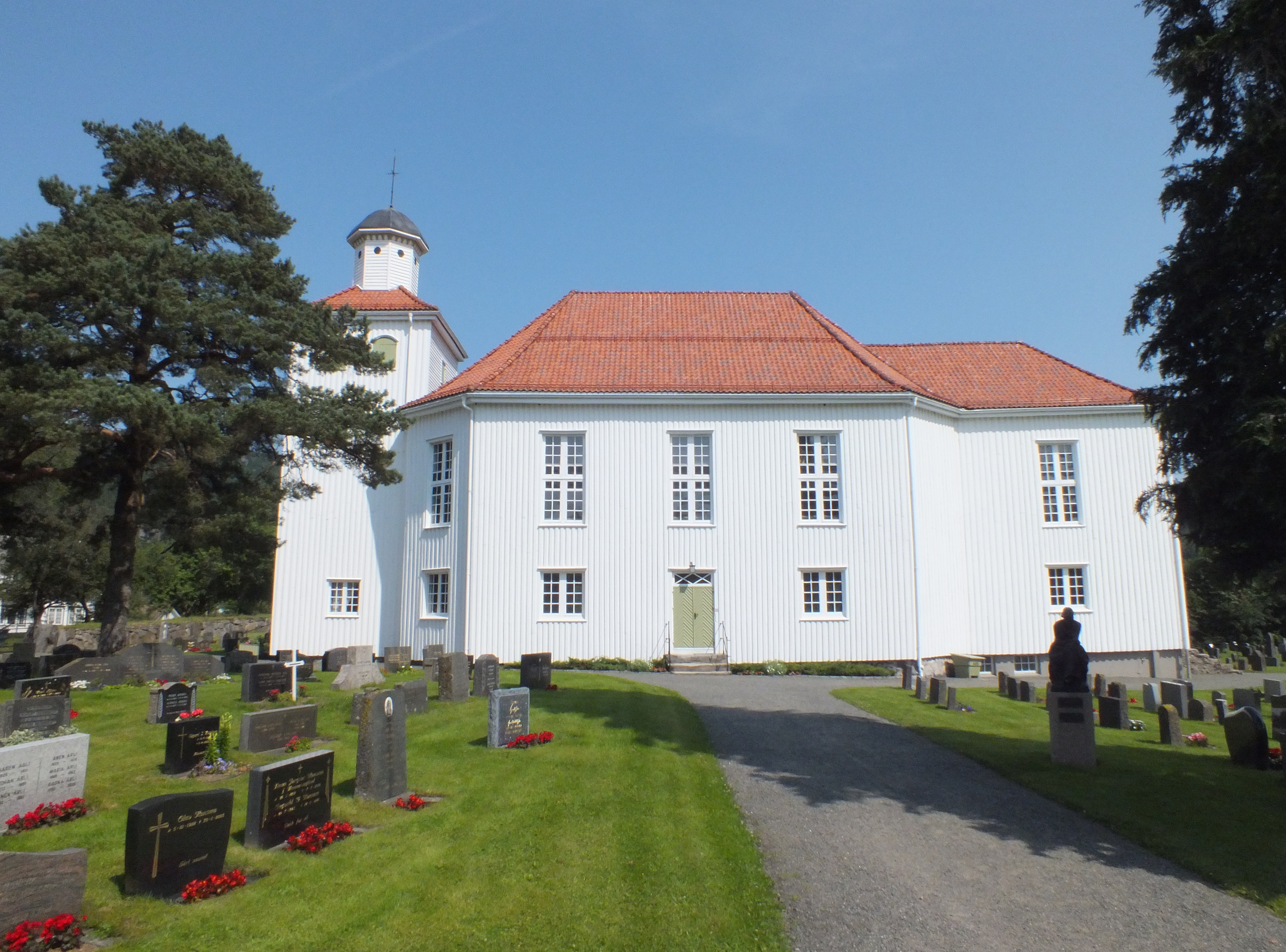
- View of the church
- Kvinesdal Church
- 58.3172°N 06.9611°E
- Location: Kvinesdal Municipality, Agder
- Country: Norway
- Denomination: Church of Norway
- Churchmanship: Evangelical Lutheran

History
- Status: Parish church
- Founded: 11th century
- Consecrated: 1837

Architecture
- Functional status: Active
- Architect: Hans Linstow
- Architectural type: Octagonal
- Completed: 1837; 189 years ago

Specifications
- Capacity: 430
- Materials: Wood

Administration
- Diocese: Agder og Telemark
- Deanery: Lister og Mandal prosti
- Parish: Kvinesdal
- Norwegian Cultural Heritage Site
- Type: Church
- Status: Automatically protected
- ID: 84866

Kvinesdal Church (Norwegian: Kvinesdal kirke) is a parish church of the Church of Norway in Kvinesdal Municipality in Agder county, Norway. It is located in the village of Liknes. It is the church for the Kvinesdal parish which is part of the Lister og Mandal prosti (deanery) in the Diocese of Agder og Telemark. The white, wooden church was built in a octagonal design in 1837 using plans drawn up by the architect Hans Linstow. The church seats about 430 people.

== History ==
The earliest existing historical records of the church date back to the year 1292, but there is some evidence that the church was likely built in the late 11th century. The medieval stave church probably stood until 1623 when it was torn down and replaced with a timber-framed building on the same site.

In 1814, this church served as an election church (Norwegian: valgkirke). Together with more than 300 other parish churches across Norway, it was a polling station for elections to the 1814 Norwegian Constituent Assembly which wrote the Constitution of Norway. This was Norway's first national elections. Each church parish was a constituency that elected people called "electors" who later met together in each county to elect the representatives for the assembly that was to meet at Eidsvoll Manor later that year.

In 1837, the church was torn down and replaced again. This time, it was designed by the noted Norwegian church architect Hans Linstow. The new building was built in classicist style and an octagonal floorplan with a tower in the west and a straight ended chancel in the east. On the outside it is paneled and painted white. At this time, most of the old interior and furniture was replaced except for a crucifix from the 16th century that is still in the church.

== Media gallery ==
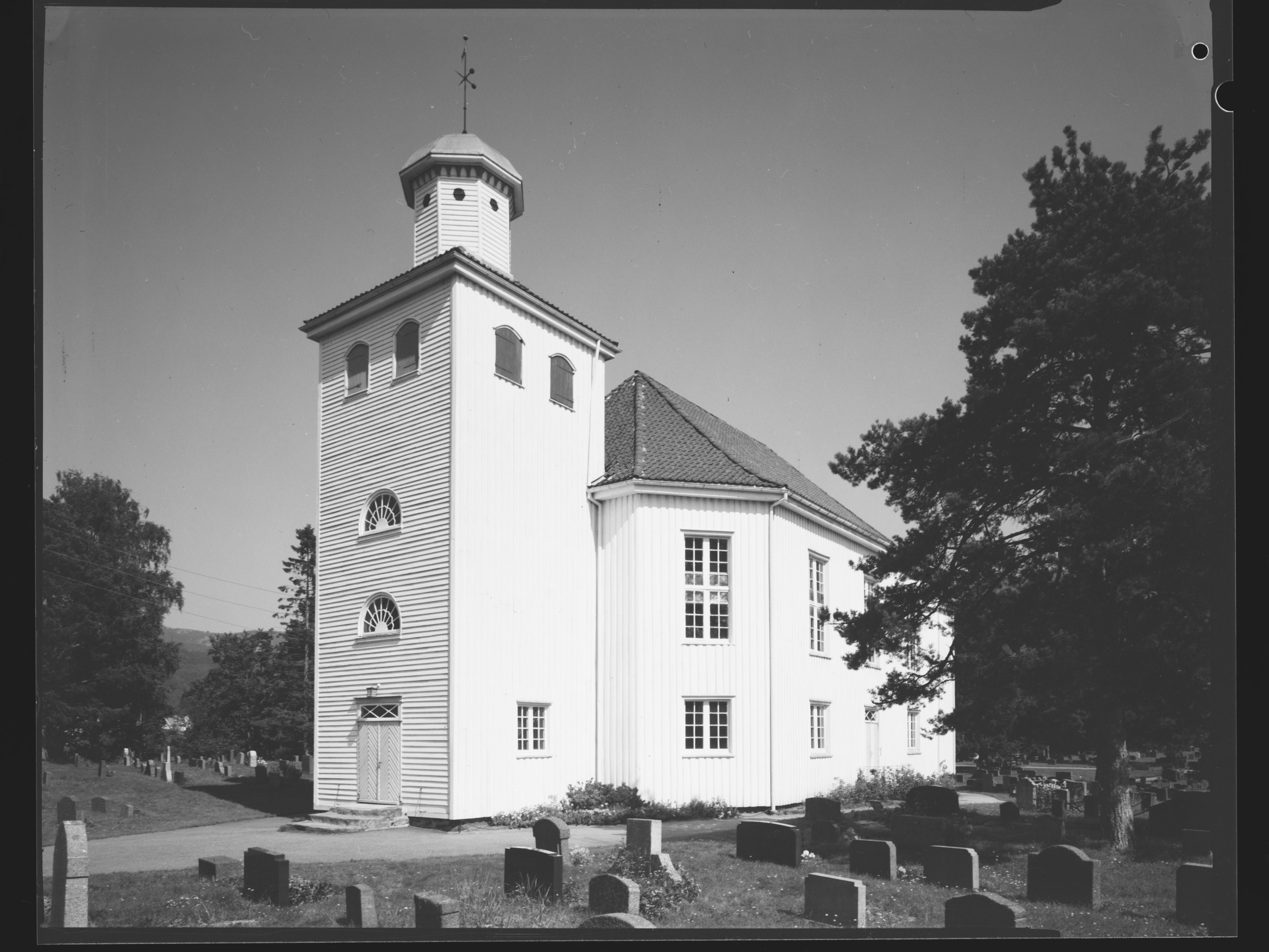

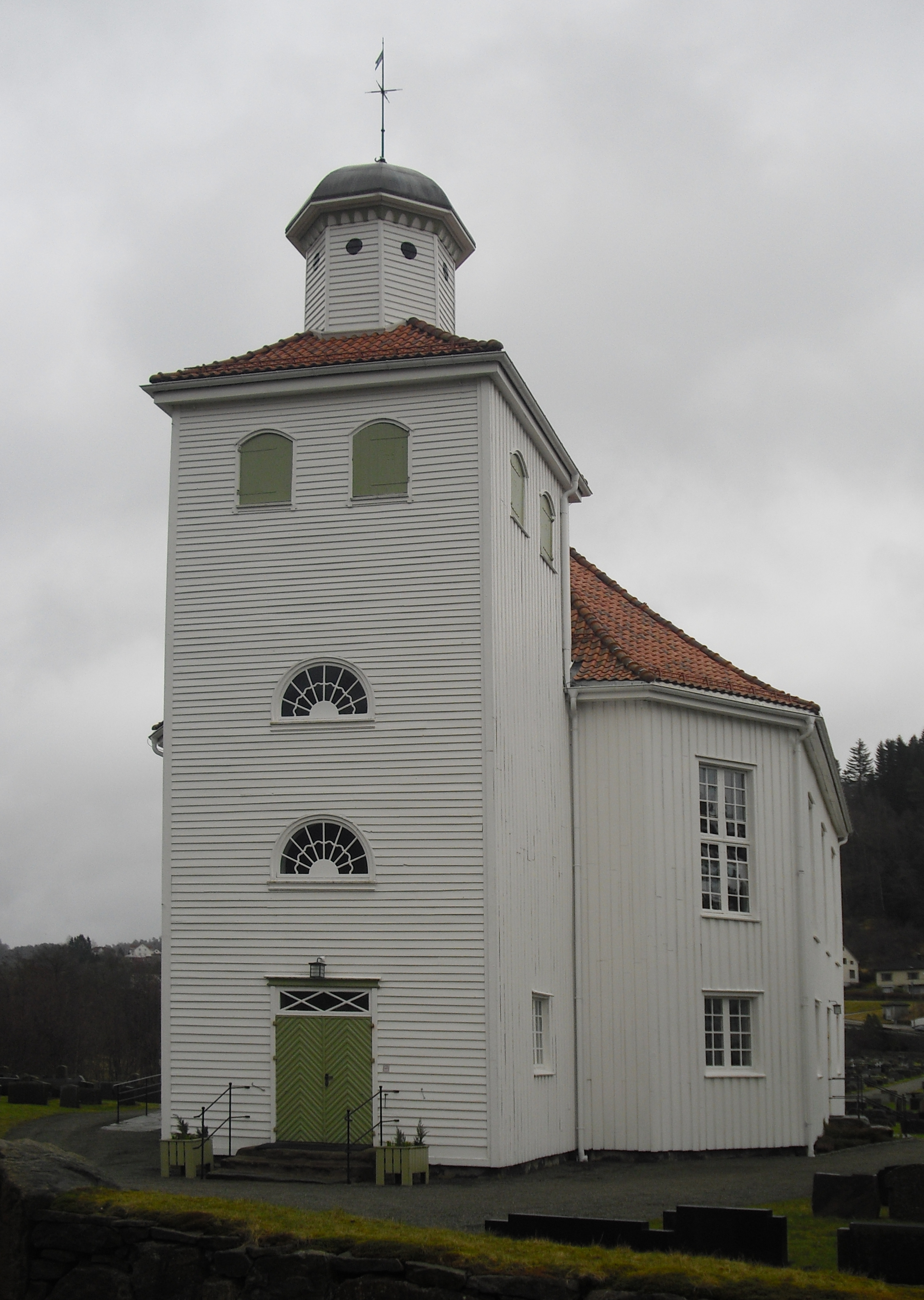

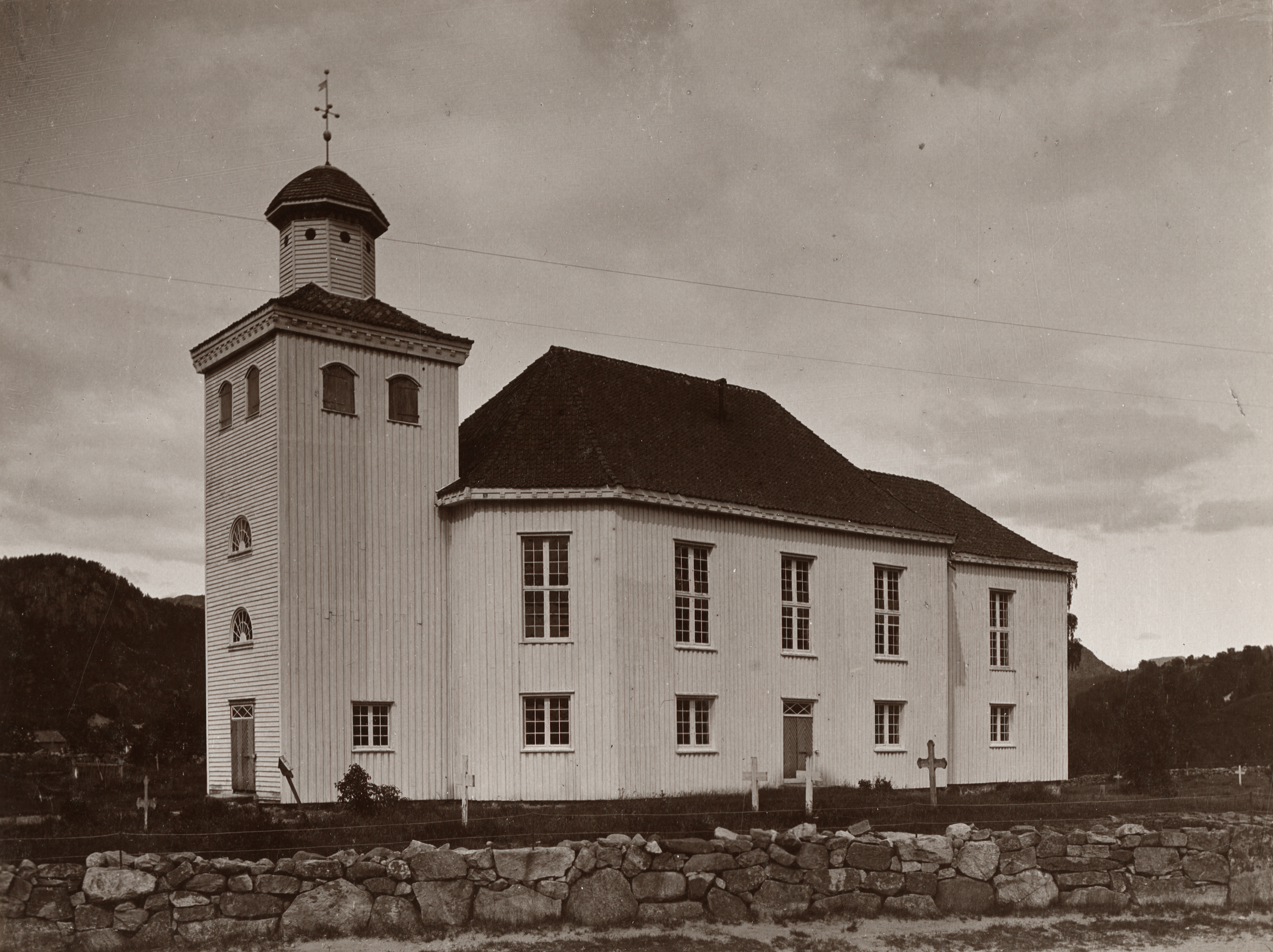

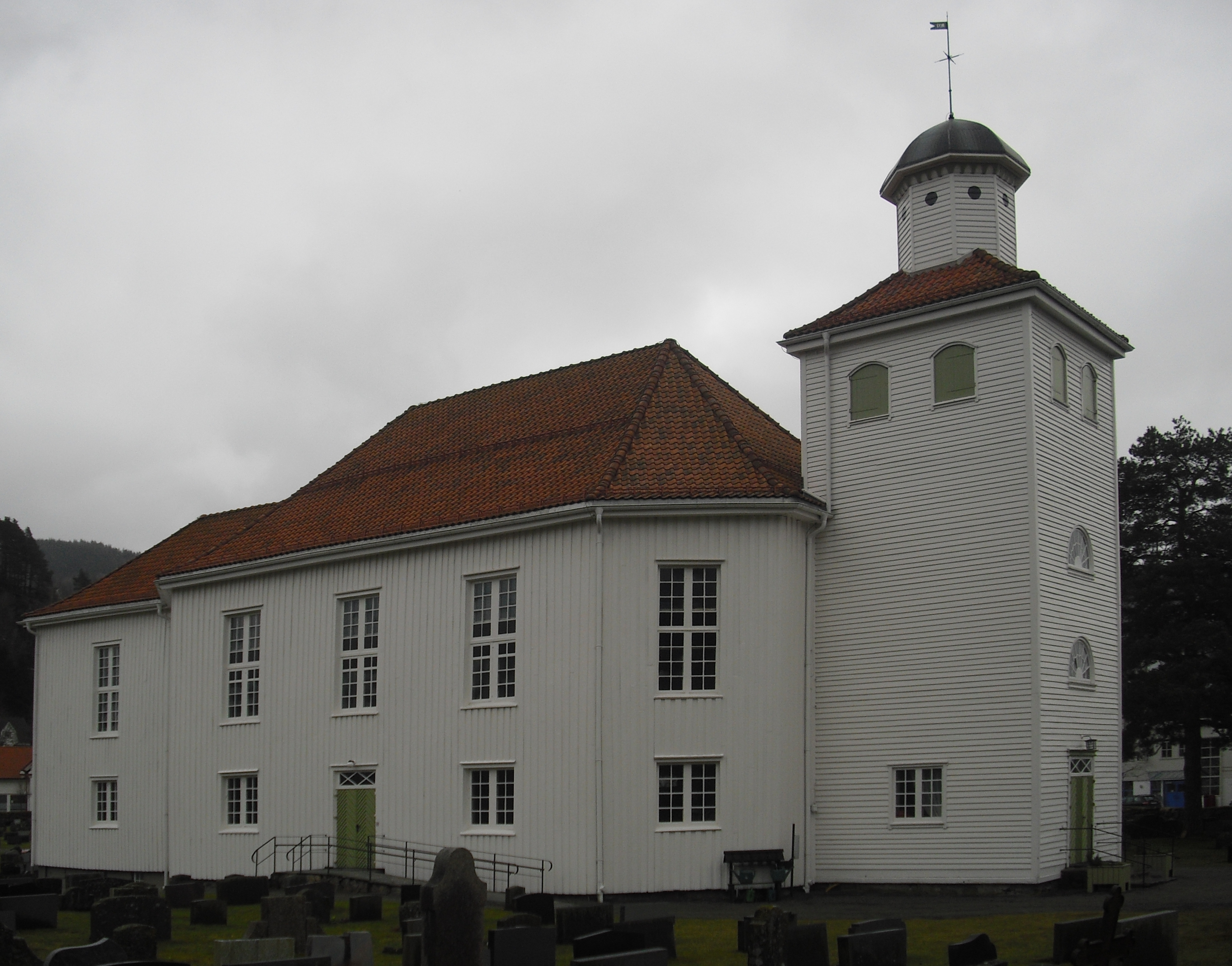

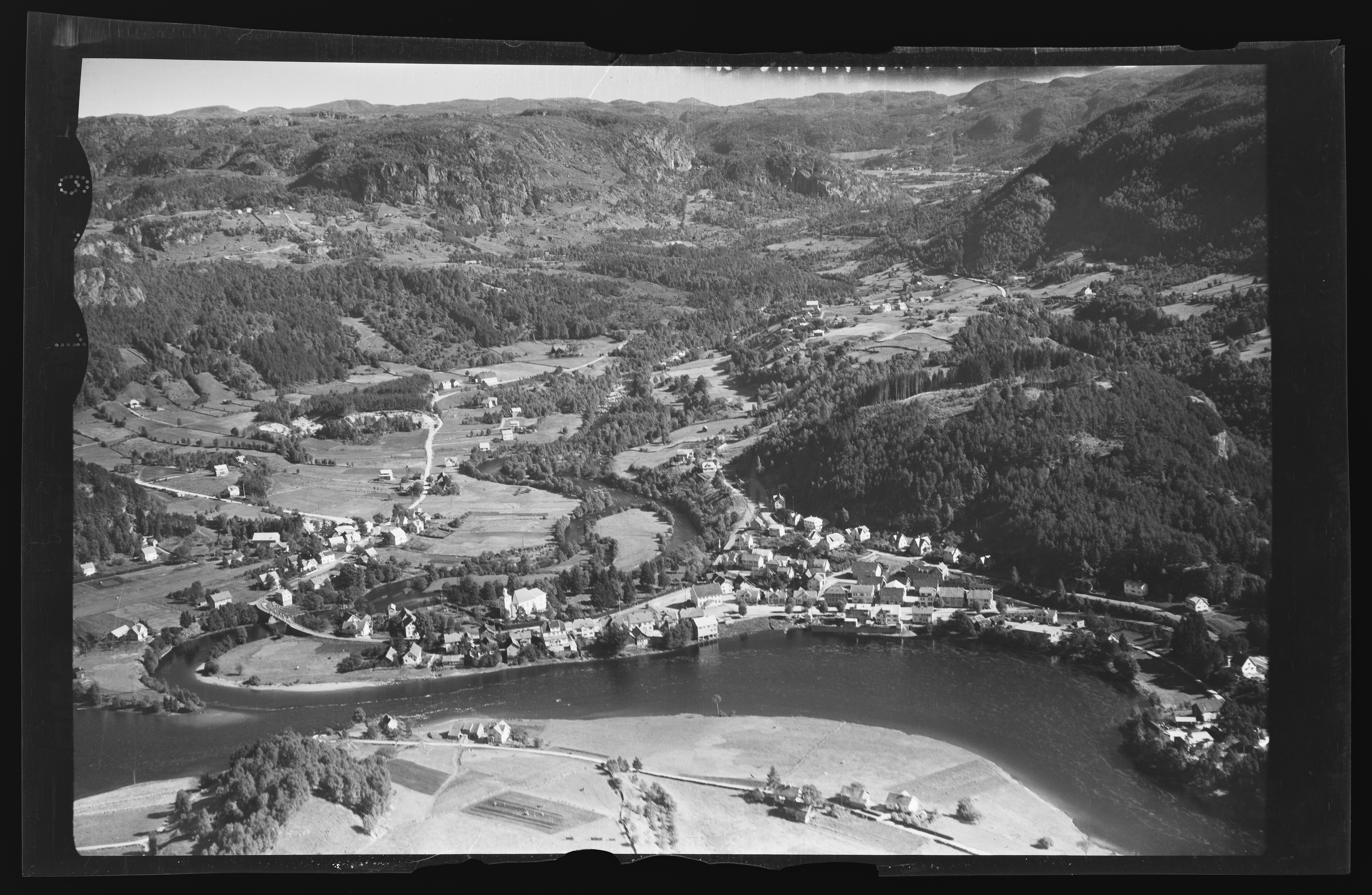
View of Liknes in 1953

== See also ==
- List of churches in Agder og Telemark
