= Per Sverre Kvinlaug =

Norwegian politician

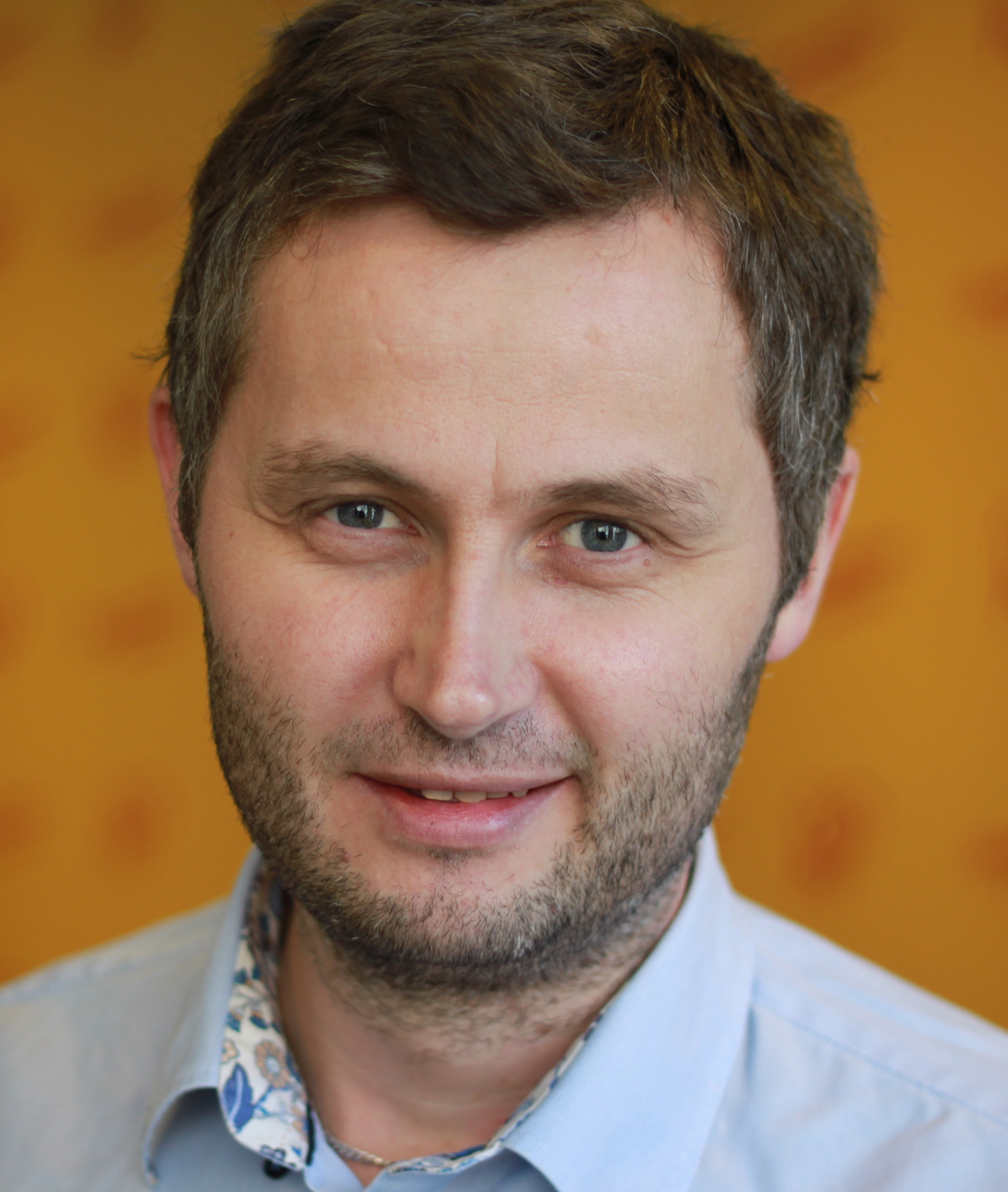

Per Sverre Kvinlaug (born 13 December 1974) is a Norwegian politician for the Christian Democratic Party.

He served as a deputy representative to the Parliament of Norway from Vest-Agder during the terms 2013–2017 and 2017–2021. He hails from Kvinesdal Municipality and was elected mayor there in 2015.
