= Fjotland Church =

Church in Agder, Norway

- Fjotland kirke
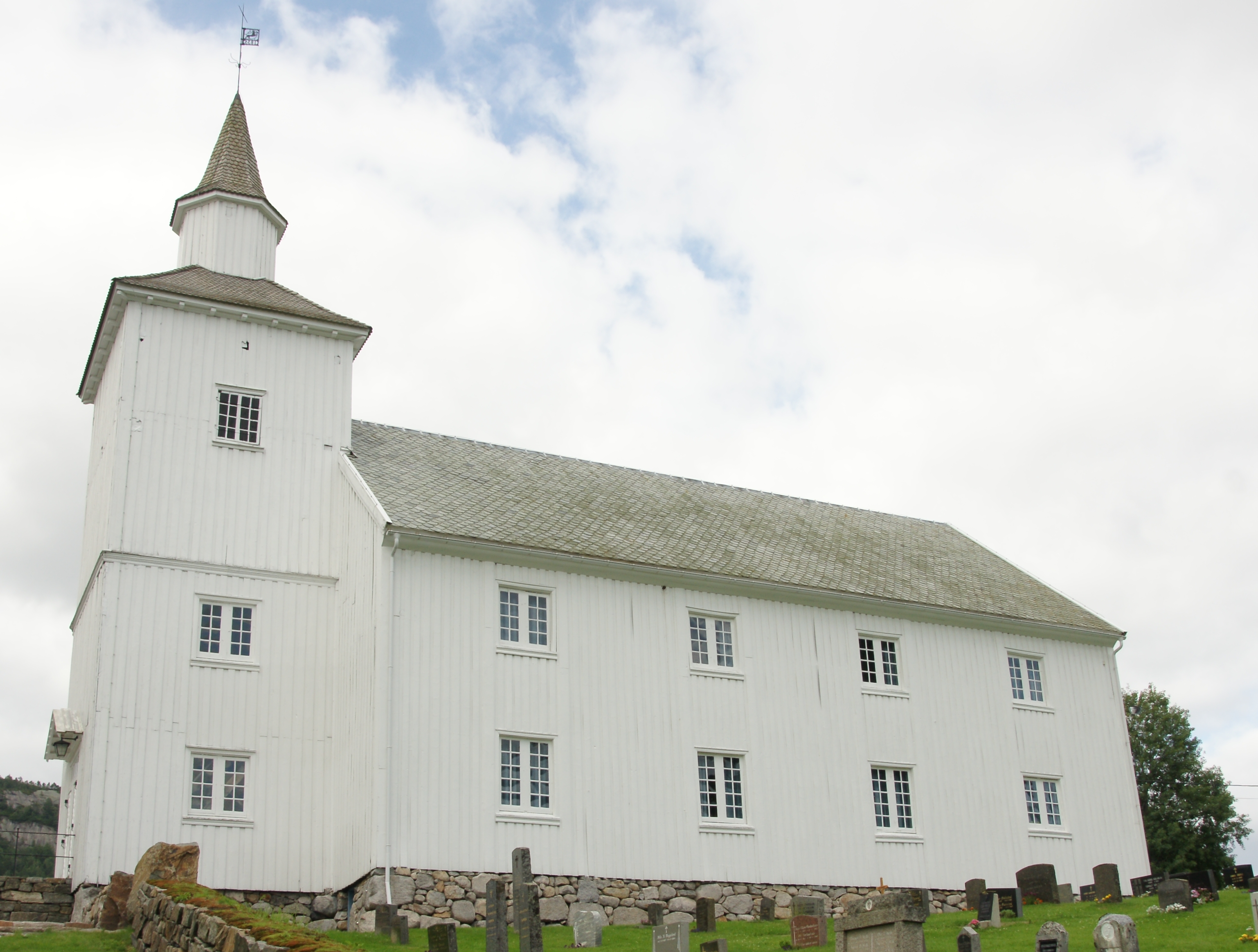
- View of the church
- Fjotland Church
- 58.5250°N 06.9911°E
- Location: Kvinesdal Municipality, Agder
- Country: Norway
- Denomination: Church of Norway
- Churchmanship: Evangelical Lutheran

History
- Status: Parish church
- Founded: 1670
- Consecrated: 1836

Architecture
- Functional status: Active
- Architect: Hans Linstow
- Architectural type: Long church
- Completed: 1836; 190 years ago

Specifications
- Capacity: 300
- Materials: Wood

Administration
- Diocese: Agder og Telemark
- Deanery: Lister og Mandal prosti
- Parish: Fjotland
- Norwegian Cultural Heritage Site
- Type: Church
- Status: Listed
- ID: 84150

Fjotland Church (Norwegian: Fjotland kirke) is a parish church of the Church of Norway in Kvinesdal Municipality in Agder county, Norway. It is located in the village of Fjotland on the northeastern shore of the lake Fjotlandsvatnet. It is one of the two churches for the Fjotland parish which is part of the Lister og Mandal prosti (deanery) in the Diocese of Agder og Telemark. The white, wooden church was built in a long church design in 1836 using plans drawn up by the architect Hans Linstow. The church seats about 300 people.

== History ==
The earliest existing historical records of the church date back to the year 1670 when records show that a church was being rebuilt on the site, meaning there possibly was medieval church on the site. Construction began on a new church in Fjotland in 1670 and it was not completed for several years. That church was torn down and replaced in 1836 by a new church on the same site. The timbers from the old church were turned into wooden shingles that were used on the new church.

The church had an old medieval crucifix that hung in the church until it was stolen in 1902. The local tradition says the crucifix was found by some local fishermen who found it floating in the sea nearby and they hauled it ashore and put it in the church. This tradition supports the assumption that there was a medieval church on the site as well.

== See also ==
- List of churches in Agder og Telemark
