= Kvinesdal Municipality =

Municipality in Agder, Norway

Kvinesdal Municipality Kvinesdal kommune
- Municipality
- Liknes herred (historic name)
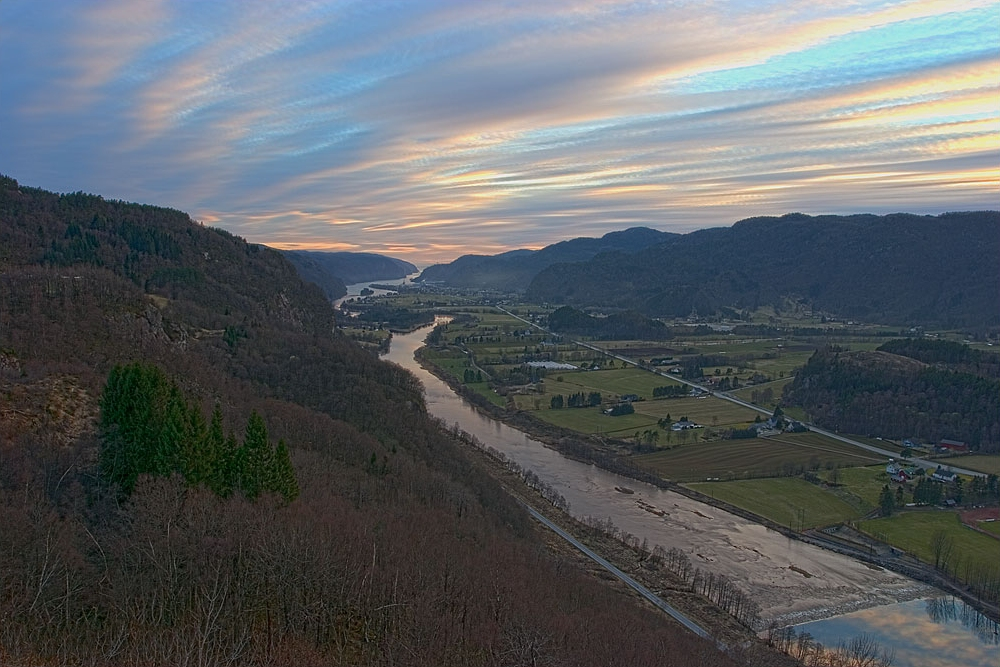
- View of the Kvinesdal valley

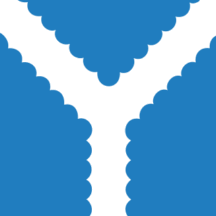
- Flag Coat of arms

- Agder within Norway

- Kvinesdal within Agder
- Coordinates: 58°20′17″N 07°01′23″E
- Country: Norway
- County: Agder
- District: Lister
- Established: 1 Jan 1838
  - Created as: Formannskapsdistrikt
- Administrative centre: Liknes

Government
  - Mayor (2015): Per Sverre Kvinlaug (KrF)

Area
  - Total: 963.21 km^{2} (371.90 sq mi)
  - Land: 886.56 km^{2} (342.30 sq mi)
  - Water: 76.65 km^{2} (29.59 sq mi) 8%
  - Rank: #121 in Norway
- Highest elevation: 992.62 m (3,256.6 ft)

Population (2026)
  - Total: 6,242
  - Rank: #156 in Norway
  - Density: 7/km^{2} (18/sq mi)
  - Change (10 years): ▲ +4.4%
- Demonym: Kvindøl

Official language
  - Norwegian form: Neutral
- Time zone: UTC+01:00 (CET)
  - Summer (DST): UTC+02:00 (CEST)
- ISO 3166 code: NO-4227
- Website: Official website

Kvinesdal is a municipality in Agder county, Norway. It is located in the traditional district of Lister. The administrative centre of the municipality is the village of Liknes. Other villages in Kvinesdal include Feda, Fjotland, Knaben, and Storekvina.

Kvinesdal is an elongated mountain-to-coast municipality, reaching saltwater at the head of the Fedafjorden, which provides access to the North Sea in the south. Further north, the landscape is cut by narrow valleys with scattered small villages. There are also abandoned mines at Knaben, a popular ski resort. Because Kvinesdal resembles the geography of the nation as a whole, it is often referred to as "Little Norway".

The 963.21-square-kilometre (371.90 sq mi) municipality is the 121st largest by area out of the 357 municipalities in Norway. Kvinesdal Municipality is the 156th most populous municipality in Norway with a population of 6,242. The municipality's population density is 7 inhabitants per square kilometre (18/sq mi) and its population has increased by 4.4% over the previous 10-year period.

From the 1850s until the 1950s, many people emigrated from Kvinesdal Municipality and moved to North America, particularly to the United States. It is noted as being an "American village" (Norwegian: Amerika-bygd) because of the high number of American residents in Kvinesdal Municipality. These people are typically either Norwegians who moved to the States, obtained US Citizenship, and then later moved back to Norway, or they are descendants of Norwegians who have never acquired Norwegian citizenship.

== General information ==
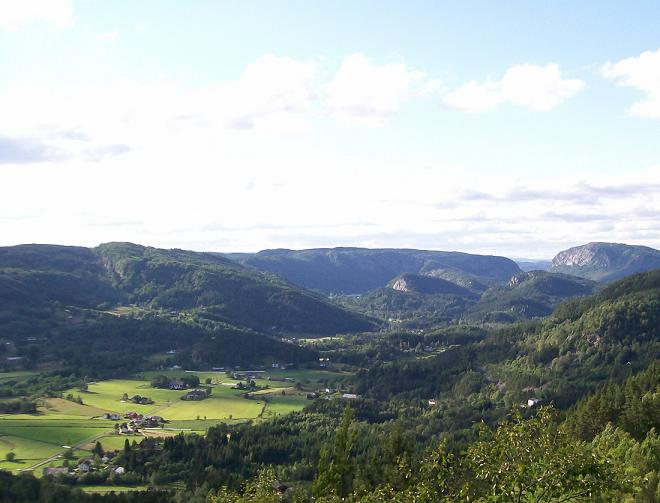
View of the Kvinesdal valley

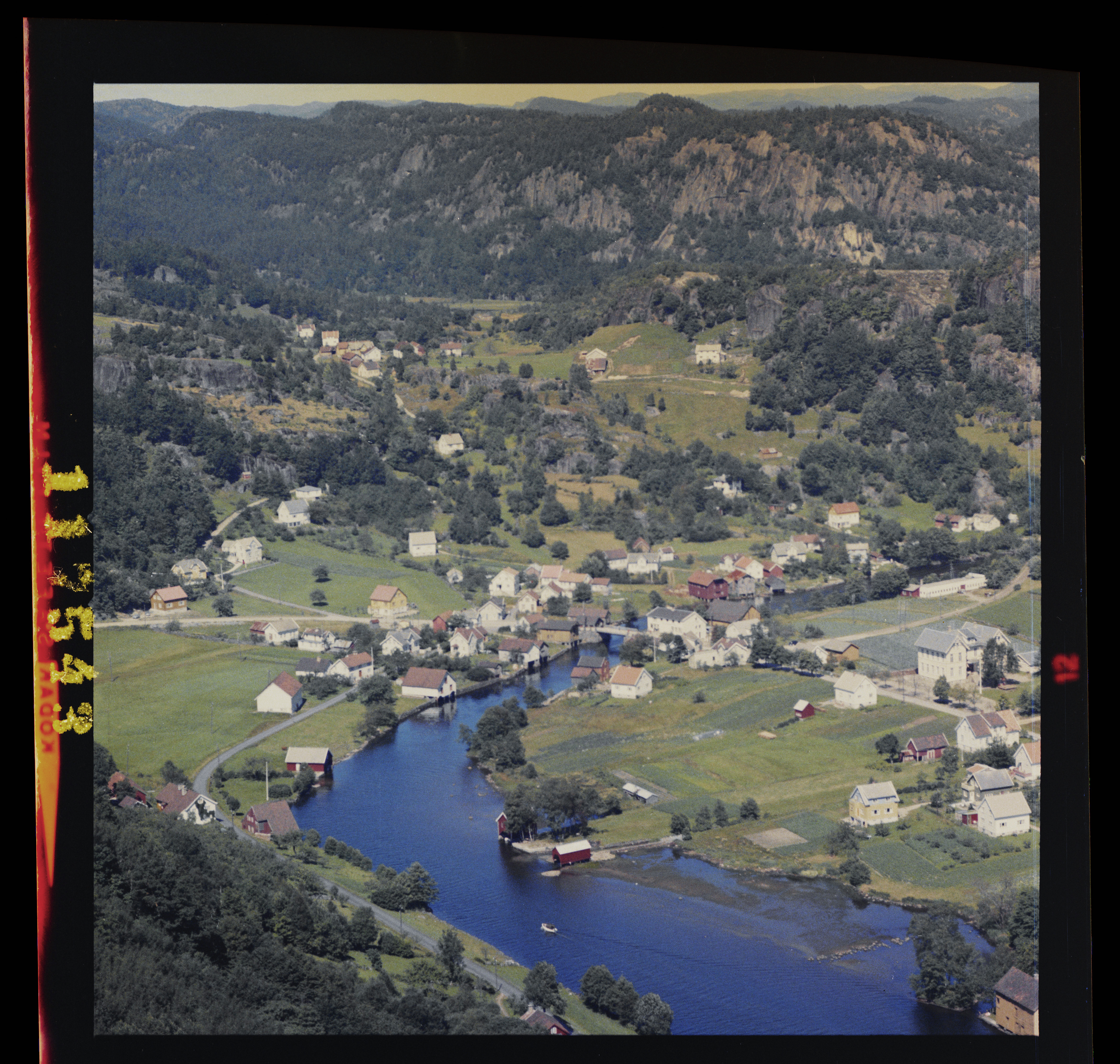
View of Kvinesdal (1963)

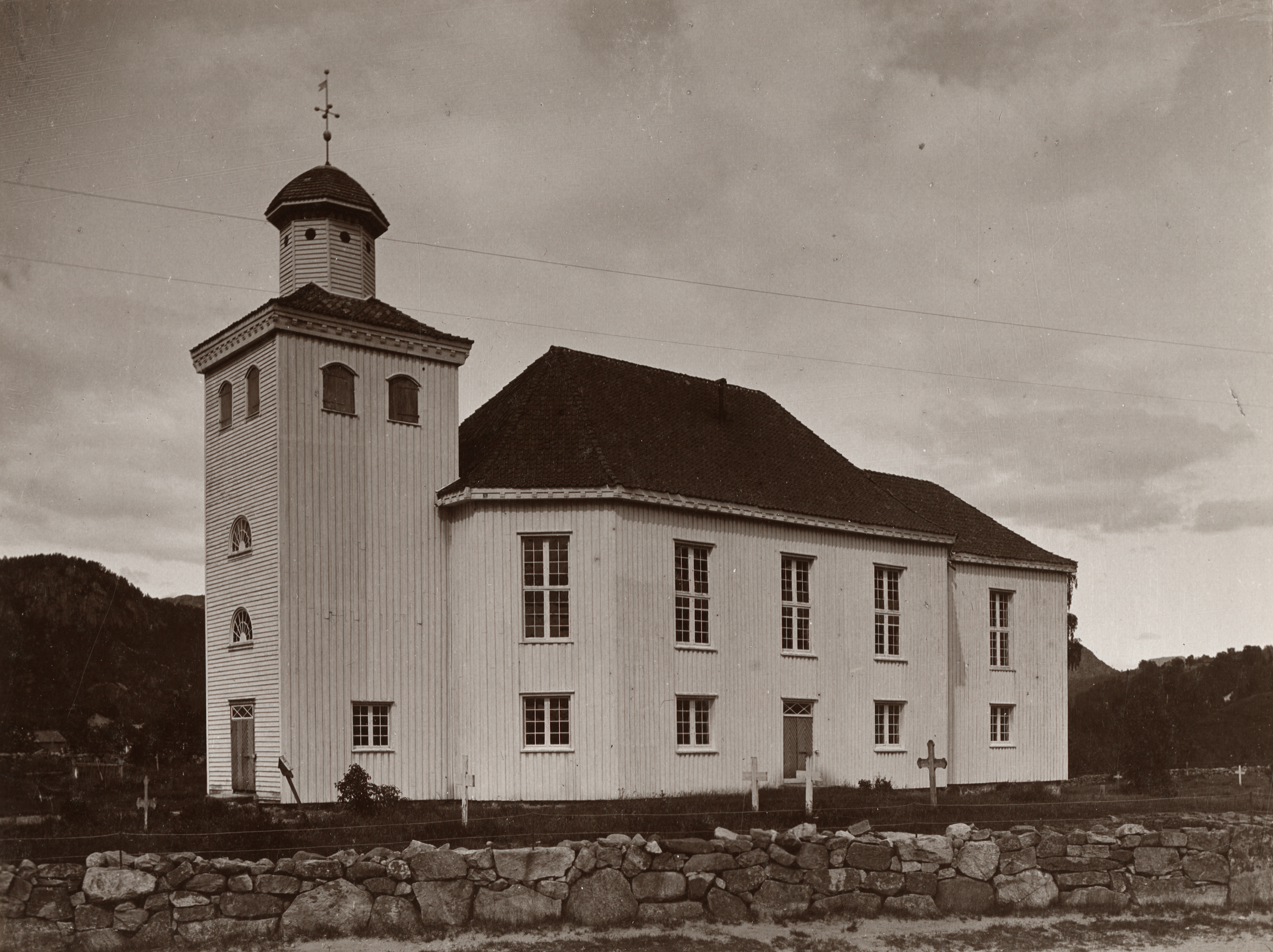
Kvinesdal Church

The parish of Kvinesdal was established as a municipality on 1 January 1838 (see formannskapsdistrikt law). In 1841, the rural neighboring Fjotland Municipality (population: 980) to the north was merged with Kvinesdal Municipality (population: 3,226) to form a new, larger Kvinesdal Municipality, although this was short-lived. In 1858, the merger was un-done and Kvinesdal Municipality was divided: the northern district (population: 1,044) became Fjotland Municipality once again and the southern district (population: 4,485) continued on as smaller Kvinesdal Municipality.

On 1 January 1900, Kvinesdal Municipality was divided into two: the southern area around the Fedafjorden (population: 1,090) became the new Feda Municipality and the northern district (population: 2,937) was renamed as Liknes Municipality. In 1917, Liknes Municipality was changed (back) to Kvinesdal Municipality.

During the 1960s, there were many municipal mergers across Norway due to the work of the Schei Committee. On 1 January 1963, the following areas were merged to form a much larger Kvinesdal Municipality:

- all of Kvinesdal Municipality (population: 3,218)
- all of Fjotland Municipality (population: 1,244)
- all of Feda Municipality (population: 576)

Historically, this municipality was part of the old Vest-Agder county. On 1 January 2020, the municipality became a part of the newly-formed Agder county (after Aust-Agder and Vest-Agder counties were merged).

=== Name ===
The municipality (originally the parish) is named after the Kvinesdal valley (Old Norse: Hvínisdalr). The first element of the name comes from the old name for the local Fedafjorden. The old name of the fjord was Hvínir. The old fjord name comes from the name of the main river, Kvina, which flows into the fjord. The old river name, Hvín is derived from the verb hvína which means "to squeal" or "to whistle". The last element of the name is dalr which means "valley" or "dale".

In 1900, the municipality was renamed Liknes Municipality. This was short-lived, however, and in 1917 the name was changed back to Kvinesdal Municipality. The new name came from the old Liknes farm (Old Norse: Leiknes). The first element comes from the word leikr which means "game" or "sport". The last element is nes which means "headland". Thus, a headland for games or sports.

=== Coat of arms ===
The coat of arms was granted on 15 March 1985. The official blazon is "Azure a pall engrailed argent" (Norwegian: I blått et sølv gaffelkors dannet ved taggesnitt). This means the arms have a blue field (background) and the charge is a Y-shaped figure called a pall with edges that are engrailed. The pall has a tincture of argent which means it is commonly colored white, but if it is made out of metal, then silver is used. The blue color in the field and the pall design was chosen to symbolize the meeting of the two local rivers: Kvina and Litleåna which join at the village of Liknes and then flow south together to the Fedafjorden. The arms were designed by Truls Nygaard who developed it using ideas by Hans Freddy Larsen and Lars Olsen. The municipal flag has the same design as the coat of arms.

=== Churches ===
The Church of Norway has three parishes (sokn) within Kvinesdal Municipality. It is part of the Lister og Mandal prosti (deanery) in the Diocese of Agder og Telemark.

Churches in Kvinesdal Municipality
Parish (sokn)	Church name	Location of the church	Year built
Feda	Feda Church	Feda	1802
Fjotland	Fjotland Church	Fjotland	1836
Fjotland	Netlandsnes Chapel	Netland	1886
Kvinesdal	Kvinesdal Church	Liknes	1837

== Geography ==
The long, narrow Kvinesdal Municipality stretches from the mountains in the north, along the Kvinesdal valley to the Fedafjorden in the south. To the west, Kvinesdal Municipality is bordered by Flekkefjord Municipality and Sirdal Municipality. To the east, it is bordered by Åseral Municipality and Hægebostad Municipality. To the south, it is bordered by Lyngdal Municipality, and it is bordered by Farsund Municipality in the east and south. A small segment of the northern boundary borders Bygland Municipality.

The highest point in the municipality is the 992.62-metre (3,256.6 ft) tall mountain Venehei, located a short distance north of the village of Knaben. Two valleys meet in Kvinesdal's center: the larger Kvinesdal, known as the Vesterdalen (lit. 'the Western Valley') through which flows the river Kvina and the smaller Austerdalen (lit. 'the Eastern Valley') through which flows the river Litleåna until it joins the Kvina. The river Kvina, which runs through the municipality, is known for its salmon, and salmon fishing is a popular activity.

=== Climate ===
Climate data for Liknes
Month	Jan	Feb	Mar	Apr	May	Jun	Jul	Aug	Sep	Oct	Nov	Dec	Year
Daily mean °C (°F)	−2.0 (28.4)	−2.0 (28.4)	1.0 (33.8)	4.5 (40.1)	10.1 (50.2)	13.7 (56.7)	15.2 (59.4)	14.7 (58.5)	10.7 (51.3)	7.4 (45.3)	2.5 (36.5)	−1.5 (29.3)	6.2 (43.2)
Average precipitation mm (inches)	180 (7.1)	130 (5.1)	135 (5.3)	85 (3.3)	105 (4.1)	100 (3.9)	115 (4.5)	150 (5.9)	205 (8.1)	240 (9.4)	240 (9.4)	200 (7.9)	1,885 (74.2)
Average precipitation days (≥ 1 mm)	16.6	11.1	12.8	10.4	11.7	10.9	11.0	12.3	15.8	16.6	17.9	16.9	164
Source: Norwegian Meteorological Institute

== Population ==
About 10% of the inhabitants of Kvinesdal Municipality are American citizens, and the municipality does enjoy a special relationship with the United States. Every year, the municipality hosts a special festival remembering the days when local people emigrated to the new world.

== History ==
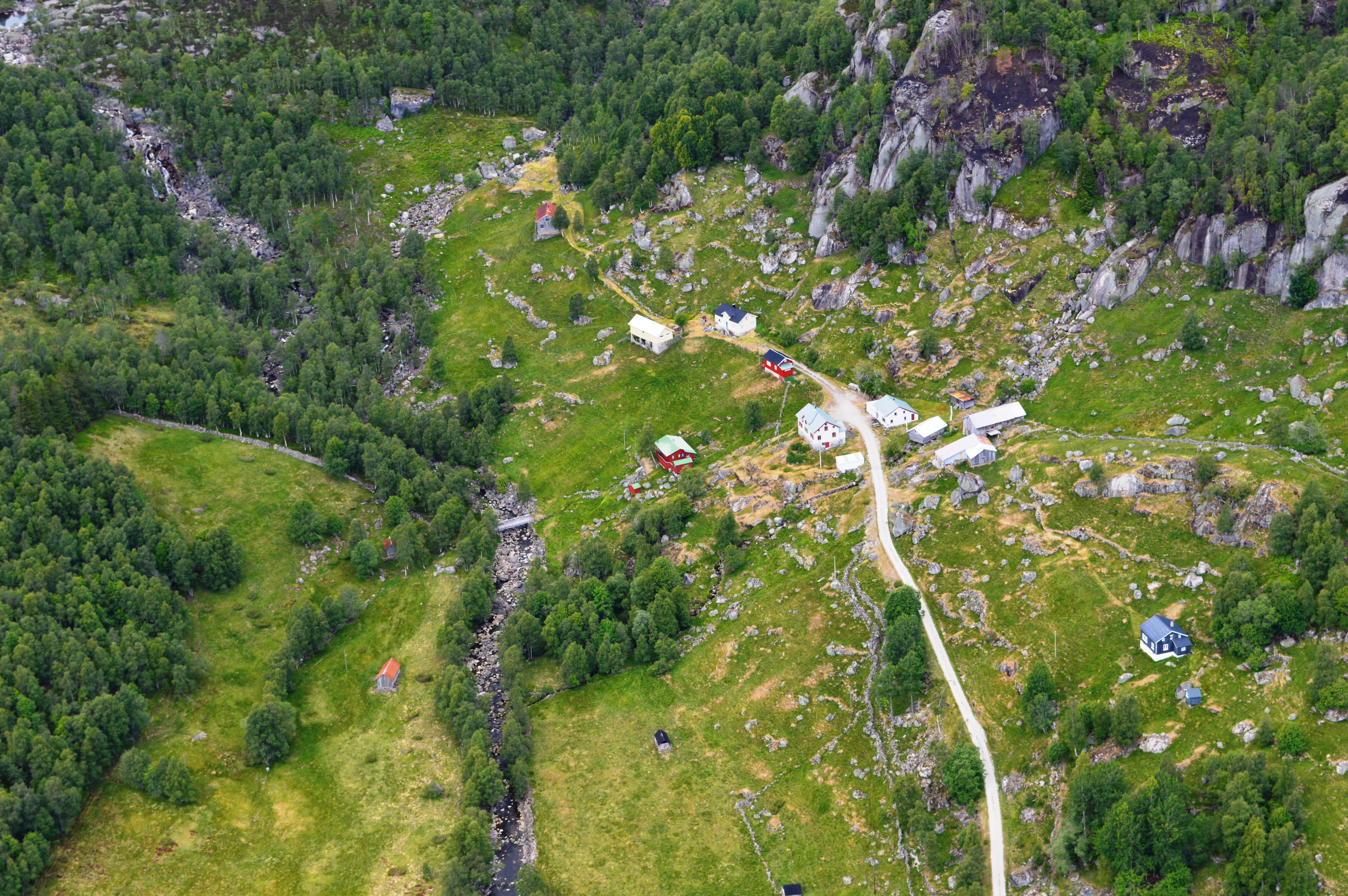
View of the Salmeli farm

The Kvinesdal valley was home of many prominent characters in the Saga Period. Among them were the Skald Tjodolv the Frode. Frode means one with great knowledge of the history of ancestors. He composed a historic poem for his king Harold Fairhair. His work was later combined into the Heimskringla when it was recorded by Snorri Sturluson.

In northern Kvinesdal, along the high plateau which sits at 550 metres (1,800 ft) above sea level, records show that the Salmeli Farm dates back at least to the year 1300. During the Black Death years of 1350 the farm became deserted, but was back as a working farm again by 1647. It is now a historic site.

The bailiff Stig Bagge, who was granted local leadership from 1536 to 1542 by king Christian III, was an energetic man when he lived at his ancestral home of Eikeland in Kvinesdal. According to the reports of Peder Claussøn Friis, he executed refractory peasants so willingly that the district thought it was to excess; he was the district's bogeyman for many years thereafter. When the bailiff in Nedenes was killed in his bed and rebels came in an unsuccessful attempt to capture and execute Stig, he collected his men and brutally stifled the revolt. Stig himself died by being drawn and quartered by the Dutch when he was caught in piracy or espionage off their coast at Walcheren.

== Government ==
Kvinesdal Municipality is responsible for primary education (through 10th grade), outpatient health services, senior citizen services, welfare and other social services, zoning, economic development, and municipal roads and utilities. The municipality is governed by a municipal council of directly elected representatives. The mayor is indirectly elected by a vote of the municipal council. The municipality is under the jurisdiction of the Agder District Court and the Agder Court of Appeal.

=== Municipal council ===
The municipal council (Kommunestyre) of Kvinesdal Municipality is made up of 27 representatives that are elected to four-year terms. The tables below show the current and historical composition of the council by political party.

Kvinesdal kommunestyre 2023–2027
Party name (in Norwegian)	Number of representatives
Labour Party (Arbeiderpartiet)	5
Progress Party (Fremskrittspartiet)	6
Green Party (Miljøpartiet De Grønne)	1
Conservative Party (Høyre)	3
Industry and Business Party (Industri‑ og Næringspartiet)	2
Christian Democratic Party (Kristelig Folkeparti)	8
Centre Party (Senterpartiet)	2
Total number of members:	27

Kvinesdal kommunestyre 2019–2023
Party name (in Norwegian)	Number of representatives
Labour Party (Arbeiderpartiet)	6
Progress Party (Fremskrittspartiet)	4
Conservative Party (Høyre)	4
Christian Democratic Party (Kristelig Folkeparti)	7
Centre Party (Senterpartiet)	6
Total number of members:	27

Kvinesdal kommunestyre 2015–2019
Party name (in Norwegian)	Number of representatives
Labour Party (Arbeiderpartiet)	9
Progress Party (Fremskrittspartiet)	5
Green Party (Miljøpartiet De Grønne)	1
Conservative Party (Høyre)	5
Christian Democratic Party (Kristelig Folkeparti)	5
Centre Party (Senterpartiet)	2
Total number of members:	27

Kvinesdal kommunestyre 2011–2015
Party name (in Norwegian)	Number of representatives
Labour Party (Arbeiderpartiet)	11
Progress Party (Fremskrittspartiet)	4
Conservative Party (Høyre)	5
Christian Democratic Party (Kristelig Folkeparti)	5
Centre Party (Senterpartiet)	2
Total number of members:	27

Kvinesdal kommunestyre 2007–2011
Party name (in Norwegian)	Number of representatives
Labour Party (Arbeiderpartiet)	9
Progress Party (Fremskrittspartiet)	7
Conservative Party (Høyre)	3
Christian Democratic Party (Kristelig Folkeparti)	5
Centre Party (Senterpartiet)	3
Total number of members:	27

Kvinesdal kommunestyre 2003–2007
Party name (in Norwegian)	Number of representatives
Labour Party (Arbeiderpartiet)	6
Progress Party (Fremskrittspartiet)	6
Conservative Party (Høyre)	3
Christian Democratic Party (Kristelig Folkeparti)	4
Centre Party (Senterpartiet)	4
Liberal Party (Venstre)	1
Cross-party list (Tverrpolitisk liste)	3
Total number of members:	27

Kvinesdal kommunestyre 1999–2003
Party name (in Norwegian)	Number of representatives
Labour Party (Arbeiderpartiet)	7
Progress Party (Fremskrittspartiet)	5
Conservative Party (Høyre)	7
Christian Democratic Party (Kristelig Folkeparti)	9
Centre Party (Senterpartiet)	5
Liberal Party (Venstre)	2
Total number of members:	35

Kvinesdal kommunestyre 1995–1999
Party name (in Norwegian)	Number of representatives
Labour Party (Arbeiderpartiet)	8
Progress Party (Fremskrittspartiet)	3
Conservative Party (Høyre)	5
Christian Democratic Party (Kristelig Folkeparti)	10
Centre Party (Senterpartiet)	7
Socialist Left Party (Sosialistisk Venstreparti)	1
Liberal Party (Venstre)	1
Total number of members:	35

Kvinesdal kommunestyre 1991–1995
Party name (in Norwegian)	Number of representatives
Labour Party (Arbeiderpartiet)	8
Progress Party (Fremskrittspartiet)	3
Conservative Party (Høyre)	5
Christian Democratic Party (Kristelig Folkeparti)	10
Centre Party (Senterpartiet)	6
Socialist Left Party (Sosialistisk Venstreparti)	2
Liberal Party (Venstre)	1
Total number of members:	35

Kvinesdal kommunestyre 1987–1991
Party name (in Norwegian)	Number of representatives
Labour Party (Arbeiderpartiet)	9
Conservative Party (Høyre)	8
Christian Democratic Party (Kristelig Folkeparti)	9
Centre Party (Senterpartiet)	2
Socialist Left Party (Sosialistisk Venstreparti)	1
Liberal Party (Venstre)	1
Local list (Bygdelista)	5
Total number of members:	35

Kvinesdal kommunestyre 1983–1987
Party name (in Norwegian)	Number of representatives
Labour Party (Arbeiderpartiet)	7
Conservative Party (Høyre)	6
Christian Democratic Party (Kristelig Folkeparti)	8
Centre Party (Senterpartiet)	2
Socialist Left Party (Sosialistisk Venstreparti)	1
Liberal Party (Venstre)	1
Local list against forced renovation (Bygdeliste mot tvungen renovasjon)	10
Total number of members:	35

Kvinesdal kommunestyre 1979–1983
Party name (in Norwegian)	Number of representatives
Labour Party (Arbeiderpartiet)	9
Conservative Party (Høyre)	9
Christian Democratic Party (Kristelig Folkeparti)	10
New People's Party (Nye Folkepartiet)	1
Centre Party (Senterpartiet)	2
Socialist Left Party (Sosialistisk Venstreparti)	1
Liberal Party (Venstre)	2
Local list for Feda, Fjotland, and Kvinesdal (Bygdeliste for Feda, Fjotland og Kvinesdal)	1
Total number of members:	35

Kvinesdal kommunestyre 1975–1979
Party name (in Norwegian)	Number of representatives
Labour Party (Arbeiderpartiet)	7
Conservative Party (Høyre)	7
Christian Democratic Party (Kristelig Folkeparti)	12
New People's Party (Nye Folkepartiet)	1
Centre Party (Senterpartiet)	2
Socialist Left Party (Sosialistisk Venstreparti)	1
Liberal Party (Venstre)	3
Non-party list for Feda, Kvinesdal, and Fjotland (Upolitisk liste for Feda, Kvinesdal og Fjotland)	2
Total number of members:	35

Kvinesdal kommunestyre 1971–1975
Party name (in Norwegian)	Number of representatives
Labour Party (Arbeiderpartiet)	12
Conservative Party (Høyre)	4
Christian Democratic Party (Kristelig Folkeparti)	9
Centre Party (Senterpartiet)	3
Liberal Party (Venstre)	6
Local List(s) (Lokale lister)	1
Total number of members:	35

Kvinesdal kommunestyre 1967–1971
Party name (in Norwegian)	Number of representatives
Labour Party (Arbeiderpartiet)	11
Conservative Party (Høyre)	4
Christian Democratic Party (Kristelig Folkeparti)	9
Centre Party (Senterpartiet)	2
Liberal Party (Venstre)	7
Local List(s) (Lokale lister)	2
Total number of members:	35

Kvinesdal kommunestyre 1963–1967
Party name (in Norwegian)	Number of representatives
Labour Party (Arbeiderpartiet)	12
Conservative Party (Høyre)	4
Christian Democratic Party (Kristelig Folkeparti)	8
Centre Party (Senterpartiet)	3
Liberal Party (Venstre)	8
Total number of members:	35
Note: On 1 January 1963, Feda Municipality and Fjotland Municipality were merged into Kvinesdal Municipality.

Kvinesdal herredsstyre 1959–1963
Party name (in Norwegian)	Number of representatives
Labour Party (Arbeiderpartiet)	6
Conservative Party (Høyre)	4
Christian Democratic Party (Kristelig Folkeparti)	5
Liberal Party (Venstre)	7
Local List(s) (Lokale lister)	3
Total number of members:	25

Kvinesdal herredsstyre 1955–1959
Party name (in Norwegian)	Number of representatives
Labour Party (Arbeiderpartiet)	6
Conservative Party (Høyre)	2
Christian Democratic Party (Kristelig Folkeparti)	5
Farmers' Party (Bondepartiet)	2
Liberal Party (Venstre)	7
Local List(s) (Lokale lister)	3
Total number of members:	25

Kvinesdal herredsstyre 1951–1955
Party name (in Norwegian)	Number of representatives
Labour Party (Arbeiderpartiet)	6
Conservative Party (Høyre)	1
Christian Democratic Party (Kristelig Folkeparti)	5
Farmers' Party (Bondepartiet)	1
Liberal Party (Venstre)	6
Local List(s) (Lokale lister)	5
Total number of members:	24

Kvinesdal herredsstyre 1947–1951
Party name (in Norwegian)	Number of representatives
Labour Party (Arbeiderpartiet)	4
Communist Party (Kommunistiske Parti)	1
Christian Democratic Party (Kristelig Folkeparti)	6
Local List(s) (Lokale lister)	13
Total number of members:	24

Kvinesdal herredsstyre 1945–1947
Party name (in Norwegian)	Number of representatives
Labour Party (Arbeiderpartiet)	6
Communist Party (Kommunistiske Parti)	1
Local List(s) (Lokale lister)	17
Total number of members:	24

Kvinesdal herredsstyre 1937–1941*
Party name (in Norwegian)	Number of representatives
Labour Party (Arbeiderpartiet)	7
Liberal Party (Venstre)	4
Local List(s) (Lokale lister)	13
Total number of members:	24
Note: Due to the German occupation of Norway during World War II, no elections were held for new municipal councils until after the war ended in 1945.

=== Mayors ===
The mayor (Norwegian: ordfører) of Kvinesdal Municipality is the political leader of the municipality and the chairperson of the municipal council. The following people have held this position:

- 1838–1840: Rev. Jens Saxe
- 1841–1843: Didrik Mortensen Bøgvad
- 1844–1845: Hans Hansen Feda
- 1846–1847: Anders Christian Tollaksen Rørvik
- 1848–1851: Didrik Mortensen Bøgvad
- 1852–1852: Anders Christian Tollaksen Rørvik
- 1853–1854: Salve Olsen Aamodt
- 1854–1858: Sigbjørn Stenersen Helle
- 1858–1859: Asbjørn Sigbjørnsen Sande
- 1860–1861: Rev. Tollef Martin Bang
- 1862–1863: Hans Hansen Teigen
- 1864–1867: Rev. Tollef Martin Bang
- 1868–1874: Hans Hansen Teigen
- 1874–1875: Andreas Andersen Lindland
- 1876–1877: Ole Svendsen Jerstad
- 1878–1879: Hans Berntsen Gullestad
- 1880–1898: Andreas Andersen Lindland
- 1899–1907: Daniel Olsen Aamodt
- 1908–1916: Gabriel Sørensen Røynestad
- 1917–1919: Karl Arnesen Haugland
- 1920–1928: Jens Hompland
- 1929–1931: Sevald Åmodt
- 1932–1934: Jens Hompland
- 1935–1937: Sevald Åmodt
- 1938–1940: Hans O. Egeland
- 1941–1942: Sevald Åmodt
- 1943–1945: Halvdan Hansen (NS)
- 1945–1947: Hans O. Egeland
- 1948–1971: Tønnes Oksefjell (V)
- 1971–1975: Olav A. Egeland (Ap)
- 1975–1979: Arnold Omland (KrF)
- 1979–1983: Olav Konsmo (H)
- 1983–1990: Arnold Omland (KrF)
- 1990–1999: Anders Mathias Larsen (KrF)
- 1999–2003: Sigmund Oksefjell (Sp)
- 2003–2013: Odd Omland (Ap)
- 2013–2015: Svein Arne Jerstad (Ap)
- 2015–present: Per Sverre Kvinlaug (KrF)

== Economy ==
In addition to various small businesses and public services, Kvinesdal's economy is driven in part by hydroelectric power. The Sira-Kvina power company derives hydroelectric power from the Kvina river, in addition to various smaller dams. Eramet is an important local employer that provides work to about 200 persons in producing manganese-alloys. There is also a small tourism industry, with golfing and fishing being the main draws.

== Notable people ==
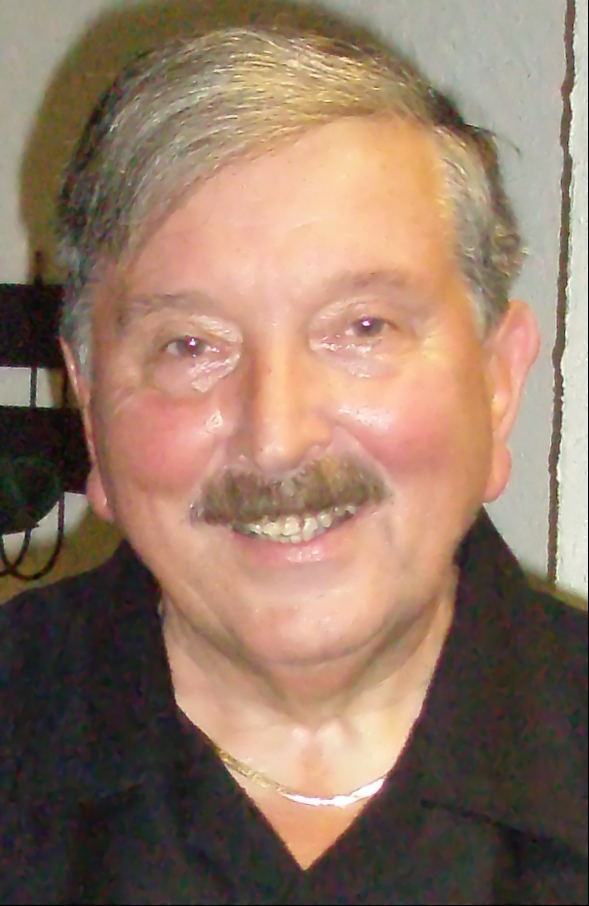
Aril Edvardsen, 2007

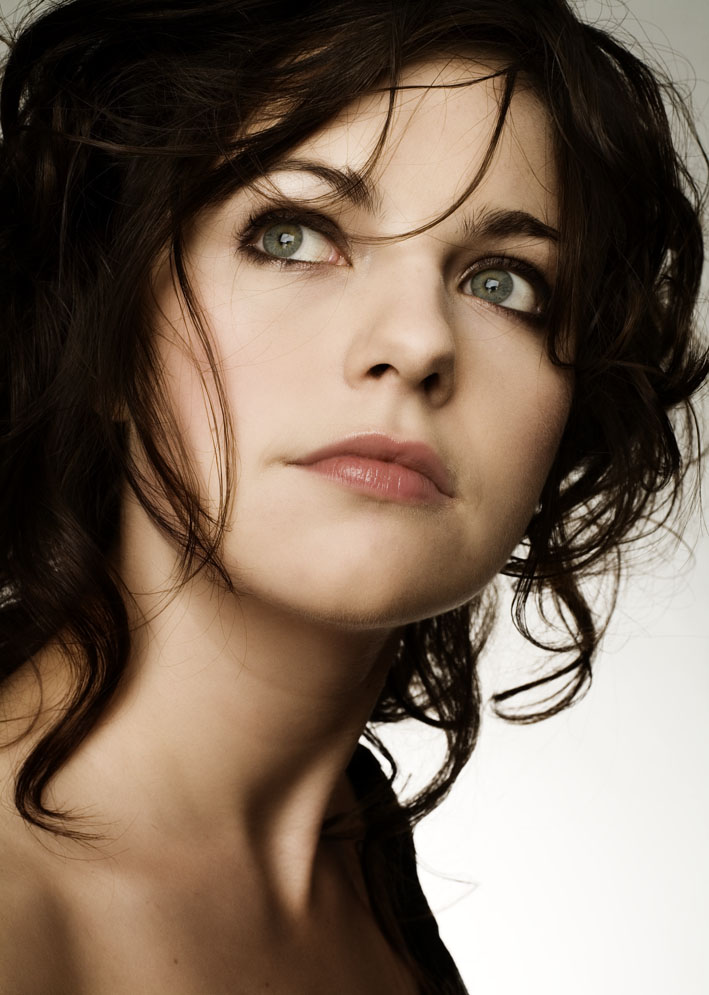
Silvia Moi, 2006

- Peder Jacobsen Bøgvald (1762 in Feda – 1829), a sea captain, farmer, and politician
- Kristian Marcelius Førland (1891–1978), an artist who lived and painted in Kvinesdal
- Erling Moi (1918 in Kvinesdal – 1944), a Norwegian resistance member in WWII
- Sigbjørn Hølmebakk (1922 in Feda – 1981), an author
- Anne Gullestad (1925 in Kvinesdal – 1998), an actress and theatre director
- Gordon Hølmebakk (1928 in Feda – 2018), a publishing editor, essayist, and novelist
- Aril Edvardsen (1938 in Kvinesdal – 2008), an evangelical preacher and missionary whose former home is now a museum
- Andreas Hompland (born 1946 in Kvinesdal), a social scientist, journalist, and non-fiction writer
- Arnfinn Moland (born 1951 in Kvinesdal), a historian and writer
- Odd Omland (born 1956), a politician who was mayor of Kvinesdal from 2003 to 2013
- Per Sverre Kvinlaug (born 1974), a politician who was mayor of Kvinesdal starting in 2015
- Silvia Moi (born 1978 in Kvinesdal), an opera singer
- Luxus Leverpostei, (Norwegian Wiki), a band formed in Kvinesdal in 1991

=== Sport ===
- Ludvig Hunsbedt, (Norwegian Wiki) (born 1961 in Kvinesdal), a rallycross driver
- Roger Eskeland (born 1977), a football goalkeeper
- Atle Roar Håland (born 1977), a retired footballer with over 300 club caps

== See also ==
- Kvinesdal Rock Festival
