= Kvinesdal (valley) =

Valley in Agder, Norway

- Vesterdalen
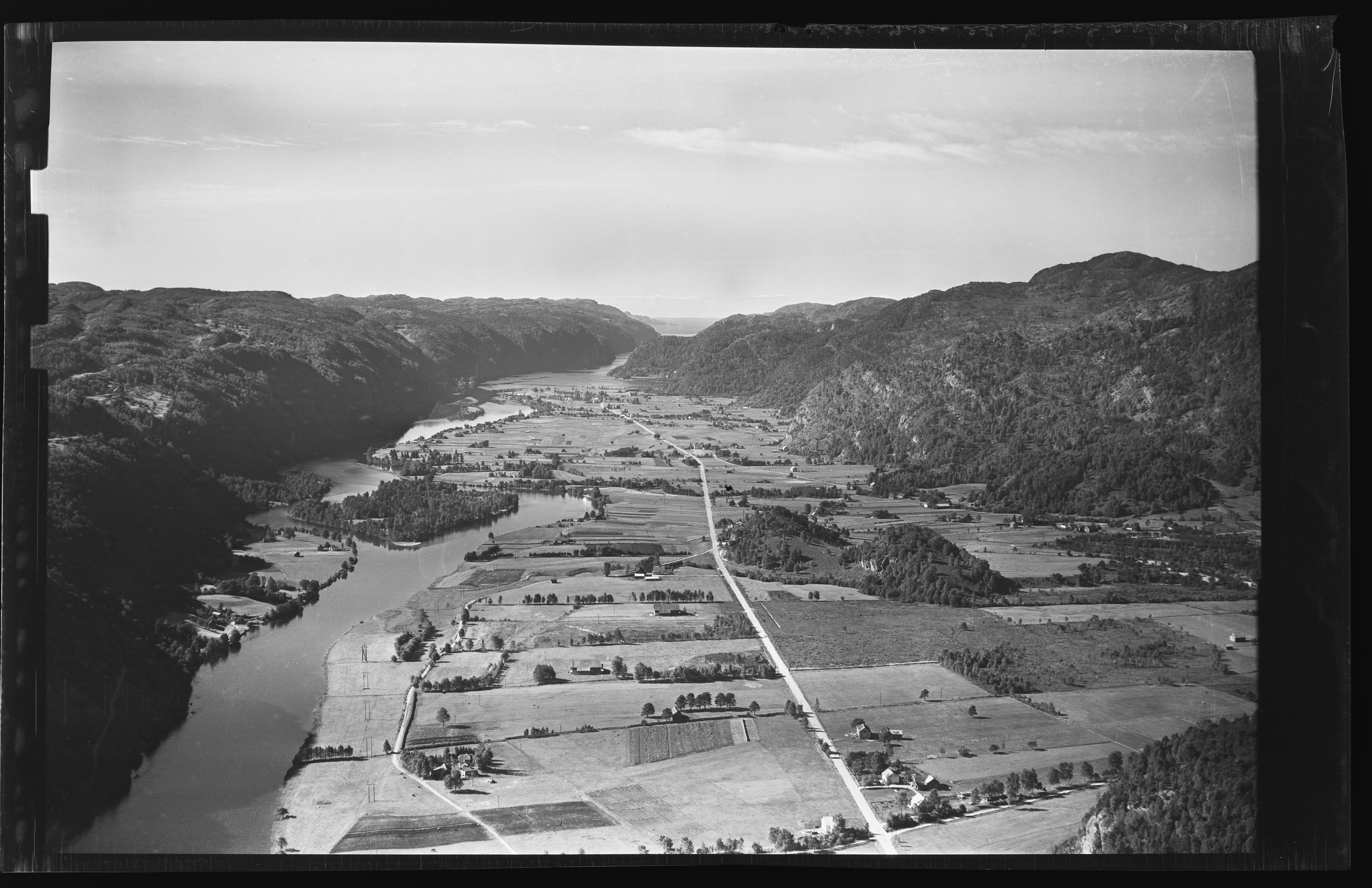
- View of the valley between Øye and Liknes
- Long-axis direction: N-S

Geology
- Type: River valley

Geography
- Location: Agder, Norway
- Population centers: Liknes, Storekvina
- Coordinates: 58.42768°N 6.92319°E
- River: Kvina

Location
- Interactive map of Kvinesdal

Kvinesdal is a river valley in Kvinesdal Municipality in Agder county, Norway. The valley follows the river Kvina from the mountains in the northern part of the municipality south to the village of Liknes where it turns to the southwest before emptying into the Fedafjorden. The valley is the namesake for Kvinesdal Municipality.

The valley is locally referred to as the Vesterdalen (lit. 'the western valley') since there are 2 valleys in Kvinesdal Municipality. The other valley is called Austerdalen (lit. 'the eastern valley').

Historically, the Kvinesdal valley was divided between three municipalities: Fjotland Municipality in the north, Kvinesdal Municipality in the central part, and Feda Municipality at the southern end of the valley. Since 1963, the whole valley has been part of Kvinesdal Municipality.
