= Kvina =

River in Agder, Norway

Kvina Kvine
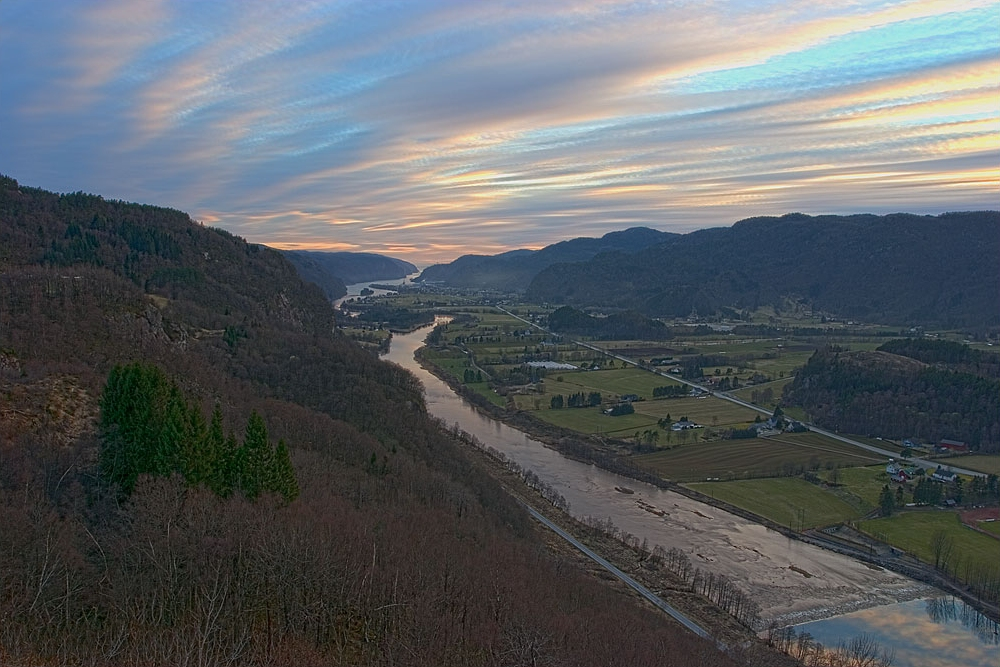
- Kvina, shortly before it mouths into Fedafjorden

Location
- Country: Norway
- County: Agder

Physical characteristics
- Source: Rjuven
  - location: Setesdalsheiene, Valle, Norway
  - coordinates: 59°13′10″N 07°15′41″E
  - elevation: 1,418 m (4,652 ft)
- Mouth: Fedafjorden
  - location: Liknes, Kvinesdal, Norway
  - coordinates: 58°16′20″N 06°53′21″E
  - elevation: 0 m (0 ft)
- Length: 152 km (94 mi)
- Basin size: 1,452.43 km^{2} (560.79 sq mi)
- Discharge
  - location: Fedafjorden
  - average: 32 m^{3}/s (1,100 cu ft/s)

Kvina is a river in southern Norway. The 152-kilometre (94 mi) long river begins in the Setesdalsheiene mountains in Valle Municipality in Agder county and it flows south, along the former Aust-Agder and Vest-Agder county border, through the Kvinesdalen valley, and emptying into the Fedafjorden, just south of Liknes in Kvinesdal Municipality. The river has a 1,452.43-square-kilometre (560.79 sq mi) watershed. The river is rich in fish. In 2014, about 1.02 tonnes (1.00 long ton; 1.12 short tons) of salmon was caught in the river Kvina. The river runs through the villages of Netland, Storekvina, and Liknes. It passes through the municipalities of Valle Municipality, Sirdal Municipality, Bygland Municipality, and Kvinesdal Municipality.

== Power generation ==
The river passes through a number of lakes that are regulated for hydropower including the Roskreppfjorden, Øyarvatn, Kvifjorden, and Homstølvatnet. The hydropower is utilized in several power stations along the river. The largest is the Tonstad Hydroelectric Power Station in Sirdal Municipality. Water from the river is piped through a 7-kilometre (4.3 mi) long pipe to the plant. About half of the water is transferred out of the Kvina to the Tonstad plant. The river had an average water flow of 81 cubic metres per second (2,900 cu ft/s) before the regulation of the water, and since then the river has an average flow of 32 cubic metres per second (1,100 cu ft/s).
