= Liknes =

Village in Kvinesdal Municipality, Norway

- Village
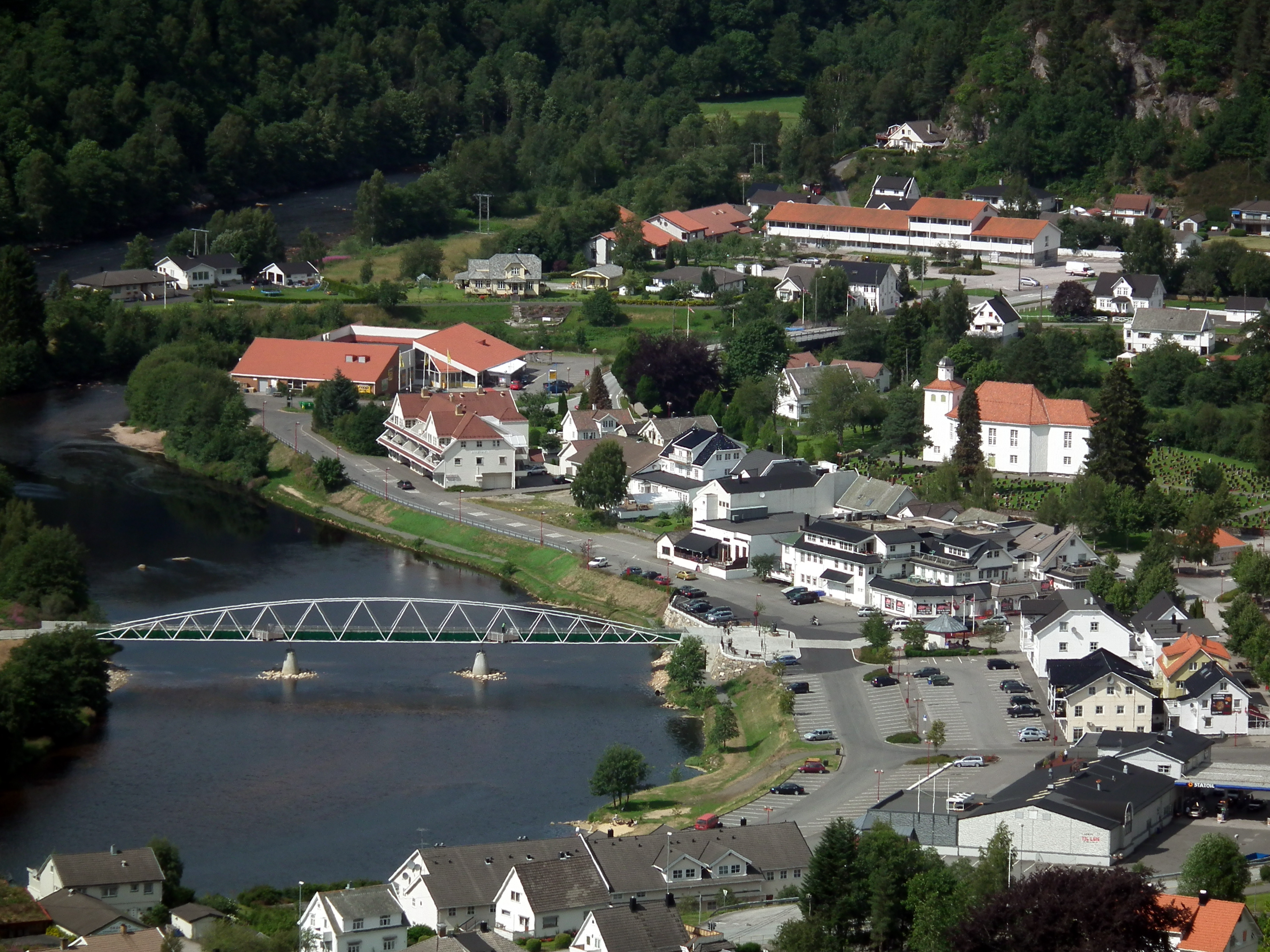
- View of the village
- Interactive map of Liknes
- Coordinates: 58.31918°N 6.95838°E
- Country: Norway
- Region: Southern Norway
- County: Agder
- District: Lister
- Municipality: Kvinesdal Municipality

Area
  - Total: 2.16 km^{2} (0.83 sq mi)
- Elevation: 9 m (30 ft)

Population (2026)
  - Total: 2,613
  - Density: 1,210/km^{2} (3,100/sq mi)
- Time zone: UTC+01:00 (CET)
  - Summer (DST): UTC+02:00 (CEST)
- Post Code: 4480 Kvinesdal

Liknes is the administrative centre of Kvinesdal Municipality in Agder county, Norway. The village is located along the river Kvina, about 5.5 kilometres (3.4 mi) north of the mouth where it empties into the Fedafjorden. The village of Storekvina lies about 7 kilometres (4.3 mi) to the north of Liknes.

The 2.16-square-kilometre (530-acre) village has a population (2026) of 2,613 which gives the village a population density of 1,210 inhabitants per square kilometre (3,100/sq mi).

The village is the largest urban area in the municipality. There are stores, a school, and Kvinesdal Church. Just east of the village is the Saron Valley where the missionary center, Troens Bevis Verdens Evangelisering is located. From 1900 until 1917, Kvinesdal Municipality was named Liknes Municipality, after the village.

== Media gallery ==
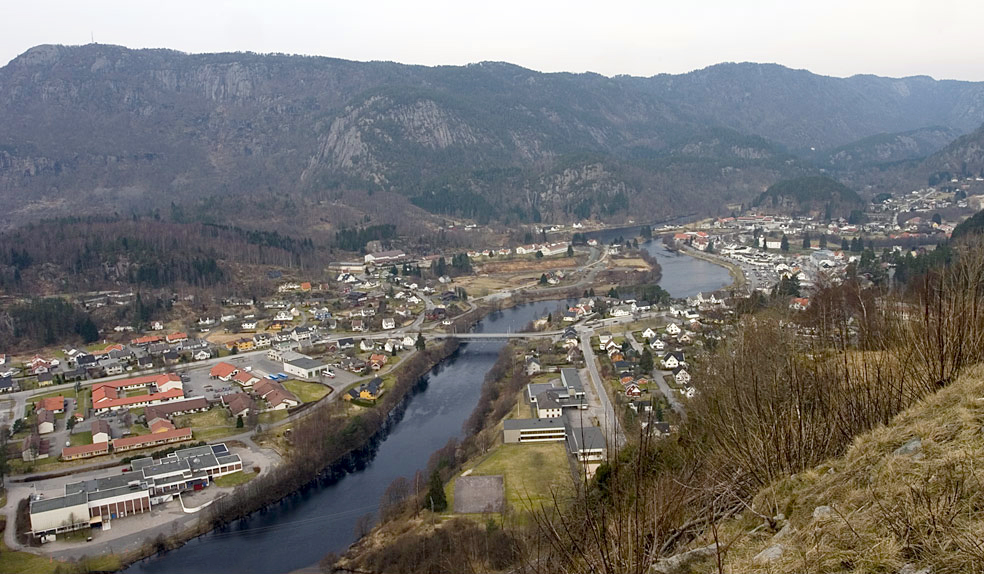
View of Liknes and the river Kvina

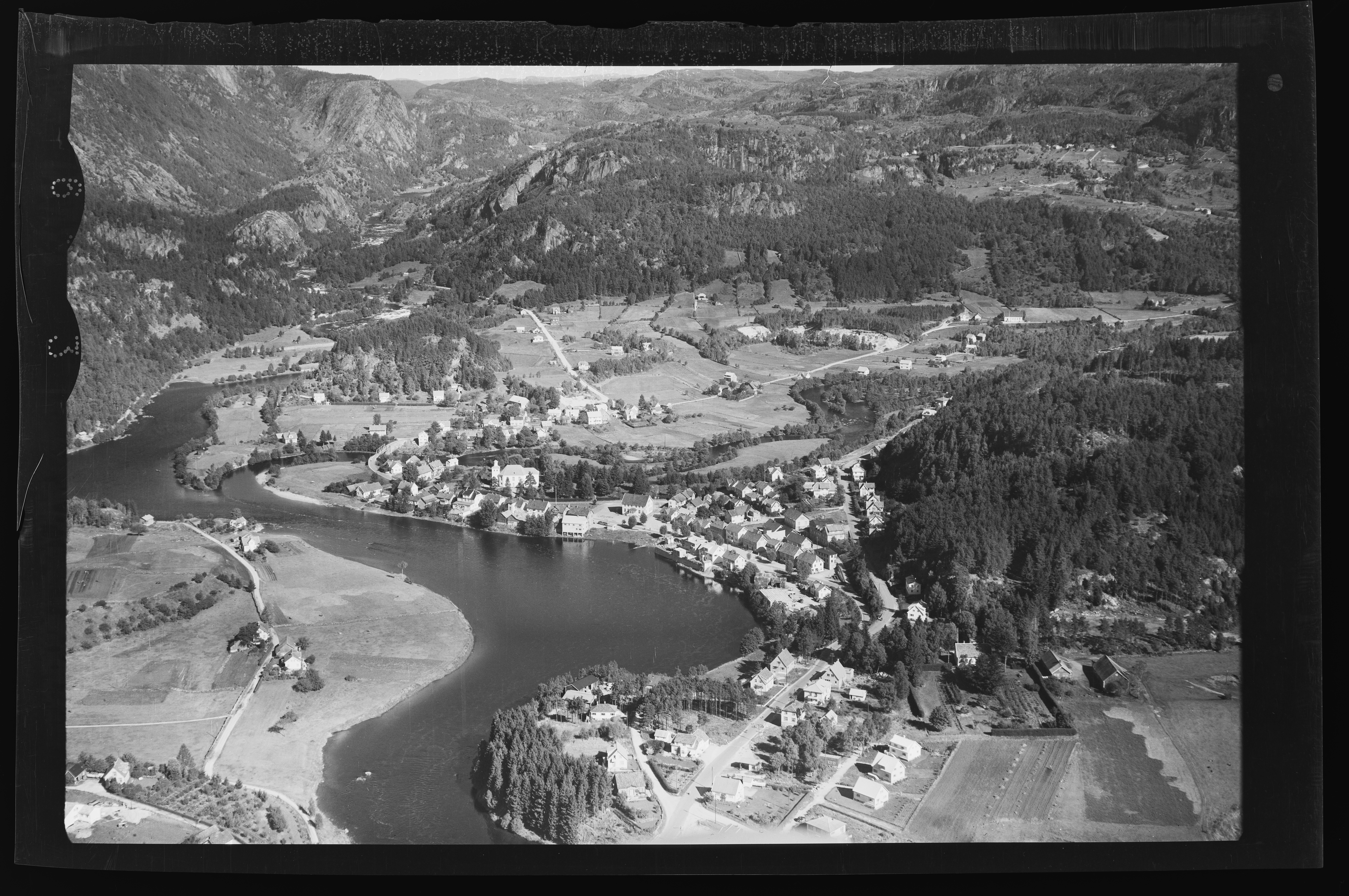
View of Liknes in 1953

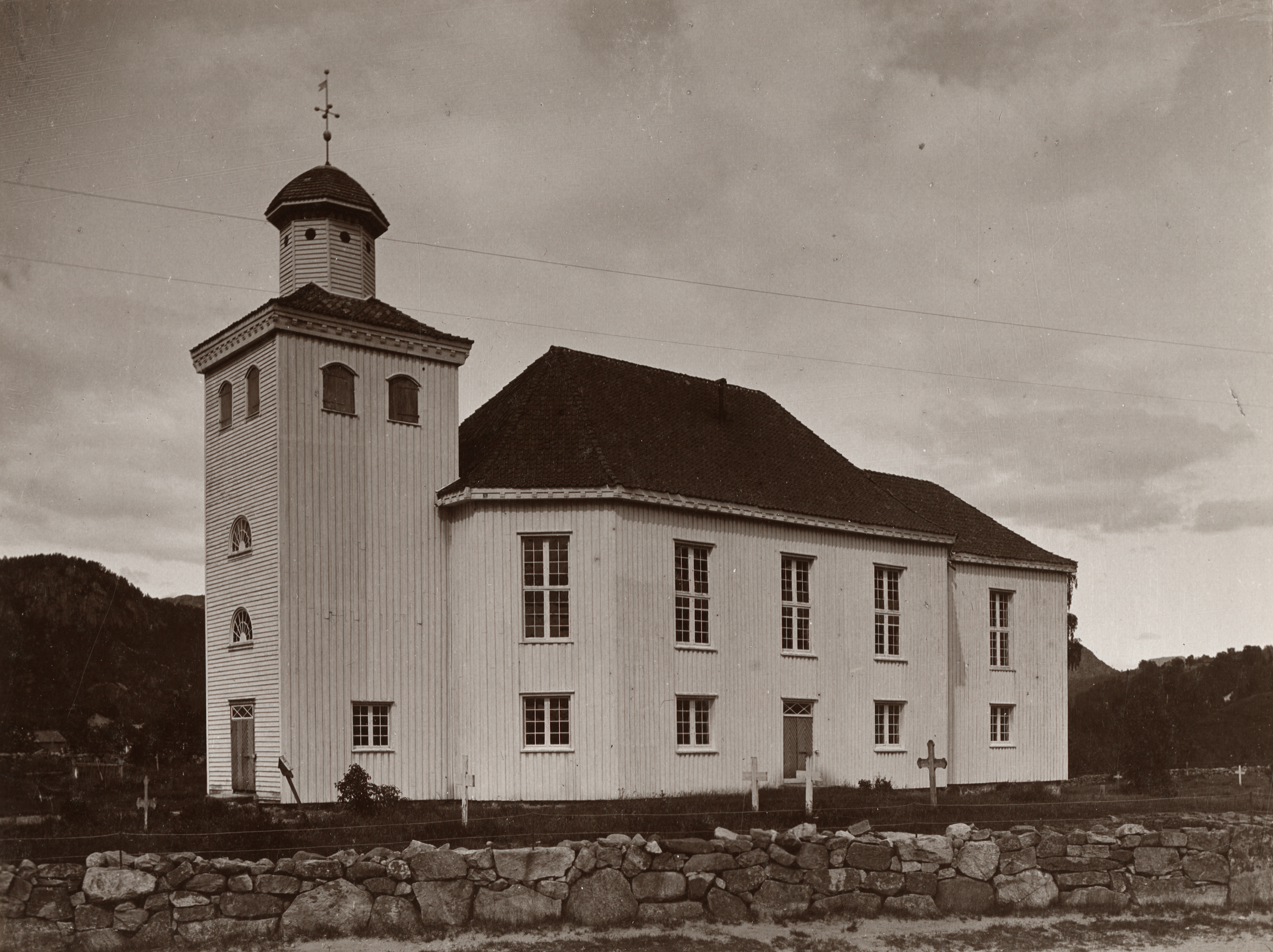
Kvinesdal Church in Liknes
