= Feda =

Feda or FEDA may refer to:

== Business ==
- Bus Feda, an Irish bus company
- Forces Elèctriques d'Andorra, an electricity company in Andorra

== Places ==
- Feda Municipality, a former municipality in Vest-Agder county, Norway
- Feda, Norway, a village in Kvinesdal Municipality in Agder county, Norway
- Feda Church, a church in Kvinesdal Municipality in Agder county, Norway

== People ==
- Feđa, Bosnian given name includes list of people named Feđa
- Feda, the spirit through whom the medium Gladys Osborne Leonard gave readings

== Organizations ==
- Further Education Development Agency, UK government body now the Learning and Skills Development Agency
- Foodservice Equipment Distributors Association, American trade organisation
- Federación Española de Ajedrez, governing body of chess in Spain, organiser of Spanish Chess Championship
- Ecuadorian Chess Federation, Federación Ecuatoriana de Ajedrez, governing body of chess in Ecuador, known by Spanish acronym FEDA

== Other ==
- Feda: The Emblem of Justice, a 1994 Japanese video game
- FeDA or Fe deficiency anemia, a disease, where Fe is the element symbol for iron
