= Prostokvashino =

Prostokvashino may refer to:

- Fictional village in the 1974 novella Uncle Fedya, His Dog, and His Cat, and sequels, by Eduard Uspensky
- Prostokvashino (TV series), a Russian animated series
- Prostokvashino (film), a 2026 Russian comedy film

== See also ==
- List of Prostokvashino books
