= List of Prostokvashino books =

The following is a series of books set in the fictional village of Prostokvashino created by Eduard Uspensky.

Title	Year of first publication	First edition publisher	Ref.
Uncle Fedya, His Dog, and His Cat (Russian: Дядя Фёдор, кот и пёс)	1973		
Uncle Fyodor's Aunt, or the Escape from Prostokvashino (Russian: Тётя дяди Фёдора или побег из Простоквашино)	1994	Samovar	
Winter in Prostokvashino (Russian: Зима в Простоквашино)	1997	Mir Rebyonka	
Uncle Fyodor's Favorite Girl (Russian: Любимая девочка дяди Фёдора)	1997	Mir Rebyonka	
New Order in Prostokvashino (Russian: Новые порядки в Простоквашино)	1998	Mir Rebyonka	
Uncle Fyodor Goes to School (Russian: Дядя Фёдор идёт в школу)	1999	Mir Rebyonka	
Spring in Prostokvashino (Russian: Весна в Простоквашино)	2001	AST	
Holidays in the Village of Prostokvashino (Russian: Праздники в деревне Простоквашино)	2001	AST (Moscow); Astrel (Saint Petersburg)	
Troubles in Prostokvashino (Russian: Неприятности в Простоквашино)	2002	AST (Moscow); Astrel (Saint Petersburg)	
The Treasure from the Village of Prostokvashino (Russian: Клад из деревни Простоквашино)	2004	AST (Moscow); Astrel (Saint Petersburg)	
The Ghost from Prostokvashino (Russian: Привидение из Простоквашино)	2003	AST (Moscow); Astrel (Saint Petersburg)	
School Holidays in Prostokvashino (Russian: Каникулы в Простоквашино)	2004	Samovar	
New Life in Prostokvashino (Russian: Новая жизнь в Простоквашино)	2007		
Acid Rain in Prostokvashino (Russian: Кислотный дождь в Простоквашино)	2007		
Uncle Fyodor and The Summer in Prostokvashino (Russian: Дядя Фёдор и лето в Простоквашино); identical to School Holidays in Prostokvashino	2008	AST (Moscow); Astrel (Saint Petersburg)	

Stories from these books inspired films:

- Three from Prostokvashino (1978)
  The film has three sequels, Vacation in Prostokvashino (Каникулы в Простоквашино) (1980), Winter in Prostokvashino (Зима в Простоквашино) (1984), and Spring in Prostokvashino (Весна в Простоквашино) (2010).
- Prostokvashino (TV series), a Russian animated series
- Prostokvashino (film), a 2026 Russian comedy film
