= Gordon Hølmebakk =

Norwegian publishing editor, essayist and novelist

- Born: 26 February 1928; Feda Municipality, Norway
- Died: 10 January 2018 (aged 89); Oslo, Norway
- Education: University of Oslo
- Occupations: Publishing editor, essayist and novelist
- Relatives: Sigbjørn Hølmebakk (brother)

Gordon Hølmebakk (26 February 1928 – 10 January 2018) was a Norwegian publishing editor, essayist and novelist.

== Biography ==
He was born in Feda Municipality, (now part of Kvinesdal Municipality) in Vest-Agder county, Norway. He was the son of Søren Adolf Svindland (1881–1966) and Inger Marie Abrahamsen Møgedal (1888–1949). His brother was the noted author Sigbjørn Hølmebakk (1922–1981).

He entered the University of Oslo in 1950, where he came into contact with Harald Grieg, the director of the publishing firm Gyldendal Norsk Forlag. Hølmebakk worked for Gyldendal from 1958. Hølmebakk soon came to assume responsibility of the large number of translations from contemporary world literature in Den gule serie, which Sigurd Hoel (1890–1960) had previously edited since 1929. Hølmebakk edited a new series in which many important avant-garde foreign authors were introduced in Norway. Hølmebakk headed the section of translated fiction from 1960 to 1996 during which time Gyldendal published more translated books than did any other Norwegian publishing house. Hølmebakk also edited several book series and anthologies.

In 1955, he married Inger Sophie Blix Manthey. After his retirement, he wrote novels under the pseudonym Gabriel Homme. In 1996, he wrote his autobiography, Den gode strid. In 1997 he was jointly awarded the Anders Jahre's Cultural Prize (Anders Jahres Kulturpris) with the composer Arne Nordheim (1931–2010). He died in 2018 in Oslo, Norway.
