= Sigbjørn Hølmebakk =

Norwegian author

- Born: 2 February 1922; Feda, Norway
- Died: 25 November 1981 (aged 59)
- Occupation: Novelist
- Relatives: Gordon Hølmebakk (brother)

Sigbjørn Hølmebakk (2 February 1922 – 25 November 1981) was a Norwegian author.

== Biography ==
Hølmebakk was born in Feda Municipality (now part of Kvinesdal Municipality) in Vest-Agder county, Norway. His parents were Søren Adolf Svindland (1881–1966) and Inger Marie Abrahamsen Møgedal (1888–1949). His brother was the publisher and author Gordon Hølmebakk. After attending trading school, Hølmebakk worked for a few years in Oslo. In 1943 he returned to Feda to take over the small farm.

Hølmebakk's début in literature came in 1950 with the novel "Don't Talk About the Fall" (Ikke snakk om høsten). As an author he was a realist, who wrote of existential questions with force and skillfully explored social backgrounds. He was a much beloved author before he died at the relatively young age of 59. Many of Hølmebakk's works became the basis for films. “The Terrible Winter” (Fimbulvinteren) (1964) about the German military scorched earth policy during the Liberation of Finnmark by Soviet and Norwegian forces at the end of the Second World War became the film “Burnt Earth” (Brent jord) in 1969, starring Knut Andersen. Hurra for Andersens was filmed in 1966, starring Knut Andersen. "The Maiden's Leap” (Jentespranget) (1970) was filmed in 1973, starring Knud Leif Thomsen. "The Carriage Stone" (Karjolsteinen) (1975) was filmed in 1977, directed by Knut Andersen.

In 1976 he received the Dobloug Prize. Hølmebakk was active in the popular movement against atomic weapons in Norway and one of the initiators of the Sosialistisk Folkeparti. In 1961 he wrote his then famous article ‘’Brønnpisserne’’ about the suspicious activities and persecutions of communists and other radicals. He died in 1981 at 59 years of age.

== Bibliography ==
- Ikke snakk om høsten– ("Don't Talk about the Fall") – novels (1950)
- Det hvite fjellet – ("The White Mountain") – novel, (1954)
- Menneskefiskeren – ("The Fisher of Men") – novel (1956)
- Salve sauegjeter– barnebok, (1959)
- Emigranten – ("The Emigrant") – novel, (1959)
- Fimbulvinteren – ("The Terrible Winter") – novel, (1964), illustrated by Kaare Espolin Johnson
- Hurra for Andersens – novel, (1966)
- Jentespranget – ("The Maiden's Leap") – novel, (1970)
- Tolv trøndere og to andre fortellinger – ("The Twelve Men from Trøndelag and Two Other Stories") – novels, (1973) Winner: 1975 Norwegian Critics' Prize
- Hundevakt, grålysning – articles, (1974)
- Karjolsteinen – ("The Carriage Stone") – novel (1977) ISBN 0-8023-1309-4,
- Sønnen – ("The Son") – novel, (1978)
- Fredlaustona – ufullendt, posthumously published (1983)
- Liljer i snøen – novels and travel letters from the decades of the 1950s and 1960s (1992)
- 13 noveller – ("13 Novels") – collection of novels (2004)

== Drama ==
- Det siste kvarter – hørespill, NRK (1960)
- Et lite kapitel av en stor manns dagbok – hørespill, NRK (1961)
- Det siste kvarter – NRK fjernsynsteateret (1962)
- Heltedød til salgs – Det Norske Teateret (1968)
- Pappa er ikke glad i oss lenger – NRK fjernsynsteateret (1971)

== Prizes ==
- Gyldendal's Endowment 1956
- Norwegian Literary Critics' prize (Kritikerprisen) 1975, for Karjolsteinen
- Dobloug Prize 1976

== Related reading ==
- Derry, T.K. (1972). A History of Modern Norway: 1814—1972. Clarendon Press, Oxford. ISBN 0-19-822503-2.

Awards
Preceded by Bjørn Rongen and Alfred Hauge	Recipient of the Gyldendal's Endowment; 1956	Succeeded by Eivind Tverbak and Halldis Moren Vesaas
