= Feodora =

Feodora is a feminine given name. It is the feminine counterpart of the masculine given names Feodor and Theodore.

Notable people with this name include:

- Duchess Woizlawa Feodora of Mecklenburg
- Feodora Kathleen Alice Forde, birth name of Jane Baxter, British actress
- Feodora Schenk
- Lady Feodora Gleichen
- Margarethe Beatrice Feodora, or Princess Margaret of Prussia
- Princess Feodora Adelheid of Schleswig-Holstein-Sonderburg-Augustenburg
- Princess Feodora of Denmark
- Princess Feodora of Hohenlohe-Langenburg
- Princess Feodora of Hohenlohe-Langenburg (1866–1932)
- Princess Feodora of Leiningen
- Princess Feodora of Saxe-Meiningen
- Princess Feodora of Saxe-Meiningen (1890–1972)
- Princess Victoria Feodora Reuss

== See also ==
- Fedora
