= From Two to Five =

1933 book of Korney Chukovsky

From Two to Five (Russian: От двух до пяти) is a 1933 book of Korney Chukovsky devoted to the language development in children. It was first published in 1928 under the title Little Children (Russian: Маленькие дети). It is an annotated collection of "childlore", peculiar expressions and instinctive neologisms uttered by children. Throughout his life Chukovsky published it over twenty times, each time expanding and reworking it.

The author commented in the book: "Two- and three-year-old children have such a strong sense of language that the words they create not at all seem like cripples or speech freaks, but, on the contrary, are very apt, elegant, and natural."

The book was well known among psychologists and linguists. In the foreword to the English translation of the book by Miriam Morton, Frances Clarke Sayers wrote: "The author's insight, eloquence, and deep sympathy with the child make this book, the product of the observation and study of several generations of younger preschool children, as important, as it is unique." (Note: Chukovsky was unhappy with Morton's translation. He pointed out a number of mistakes, but Morton chose to disregard his comments.)

Examples (some are translated by Miriam Morton):

"I'll get up so early that it will still be late."

An overheard dialogue:

"My daddy himself told me this..."
"My mommie herself told me that..."
But my daddy is himselfer than your mommie — y daddy is much more himselfer..."

"Why do you say penknife? It should be pencil-knife."

"Rusalka is a woman; a man would be a 'rusal'"

"Will you water the pine cone?" - "Yes." - "So that conelets would grow, right?" (In Russian, the word formation was "шишка->шишенята")

A sleeping 3-year old muttered: "Mommy please cover my hind leg."

In 1983 Russian animator Vladimir Popov directed a film based on the book.

In February 2024 Gorky Film Studio announced their planning of a TV series based on the book. They said the pilot episode is ready.
