= Umka (1969 film) =

Animated film directed by Vladimir Popov

- Directed by: Vladimir Popov; Vladimir Pekar
- Written by: Yuri Yakovlev
- Starring: Klara Rumyanova; Margarita Korabelnikova; Vera Popova
- Cinematography: Nina Klimova
- Music by: Yevgeny Krylatov
- Production company: Soyuzmultfilm
- Release date: 23 December 1969
- Running time: 10 minutes, 16 seconds
- Country: Soviet Union
- Language: Russian

Umka (Russian: Умка) is a 1969 Soviet animated film. It is based on a children's book of the same name by Yuri Yakovlev, who also wrote the screenplay for the film. Umka means "polar bear" in the Chukchi language.

The film is famous for its song "She-bear's Lullaby" (Russian: Колыбельная медведицы), written by Yevgeny Krylatov and performed by Aida Vedishcheva.

== Plot ==
One night, a female polar bear teaches her cub Umka how to build a den in the snow. When she puts him to sleep, he asks her to tell a tale about the fish. The tale is about a sad Fish-Sun who cannot escape from a shark's teeth. After the tale, Umka asks if their Sun was eaten by a shark too, which his mother denies, since the Sun is not a fish and swims above them. She puts him to sleep, telling him that when he wakes up, the Sun will appear. She then sings him a lullaby to help him fall asleep.

The next morning, Umka notices a small camp of human Chukchi reindeer herders. When he asks about them, his mother explains that they are "bears who constantly walk on hind legs and can take off their skin". When Umka tries to walk on his hind legs, she tells him that they smell of smoke, sending him instead to catch a fish from an ice hole. When he tries to, he can't find any fish. His mother explains that this is because of his nose: while he is white, his nose is black, and that is blowing his cover. She advises him to cover it with his paw. Umka then wonders if the two-legged bears cover their noses too.

One day, Umka encounters a small Chukchi boy who has just fallen off a reindeer while riding. When he sniffs him, he finds out that he smells like milk instead of smoke. When he asks him about his absence of a tail, the amused boy puts a snowball on Umka's snout for fun, before running off, throwing his cap into the air. This causes Umka to think that the boy has two heads.

Another day, as Umka runs after some reindeer, he meets the same boy again. After asking him about his "second head" and other missing bear features, they decide to go to the sea. While Umka dives in, the boy stays on land, since the water is too cold for him. Suddenly, the mother calls for Umka, approaching them. To avoid trouble, Umka tells the boy to lie down in the snow and cover his nose with his paw, although the boy crawls away just as Umka's mother arrives. When she senses the smell of smoke, Umka distracts her by pretending to spot a fish in a far ice hole, prompting mother to go and catch it. As Umka returns, he discovers that the boy has disappeared, leaving behind his cap. Umka takes the cap and runs to find his friend, only to discover people leaving along with the boy.

Umka, sad that his friend is gone, asks his mother to relocate somewhere else; she complies. As they set off on an ice floe, the mother sings the second part of the lullaby. Later that night, someplace else, the boy gazes at the stars and sees Ursa Major and Ursa Minor, imagining the latter as his friend Umka waving at him. The film ends as the boy calls out for Umka.

== Cast ==
- Margarita Korabelnikova as Umka
- Klara Rumyanova as the boy
- Vera Popova as the mother bear

== Crew ==
- Directors and art directors — Vladimir Pekar and Vladimir Popov
- Screenwriter — Yuri Yakovlev
- Composer — Yevgeny Krylatov
- Camera operator — Nina Klimova
- Sound operator — Boris Filchikov
- Assistant — Lidiya Nikitina
- Editor — Valentina Turubiner
- Animators — Dmitry Anpilov, Lera Rybchevskaya, Olga Orlova, Viktor Shevkov
- Script editor — Pyotr Frolov
- Executive producer — Fyodor Ivanov
