= Feđa =

Feđa is a South Slavic male given name, which is a hypocorism of the name Fedor derived from the Russian name, or Teodor, both derived from the Greek name Theodoros, meaning "gift of god". Feđa is the common form in Serbia and Bosnia.

Fedja can be either a transcription of Feđa (cf. đ to dj) or a derivative name in other languages.

Notable people with the name include:

- Fedja Anzelewsky (1919–2010), German art historian
- Feđa Stojanović (1948–2021), Serbian actor
- Feđa Dudić (born 1983), Bosnian footballer
- Feđa Isović (born 1965), Bosnian writer
- Fedja Marušič (born 1971), Slovene slalom canoer
- Fedja Stefanov, Bulgarian sprint canoer
- Fedja van Huêt (born 1973), Dutch actor
