= Andabeløya =

Island in Agder, Norway

Andabeløya Andabeløyna
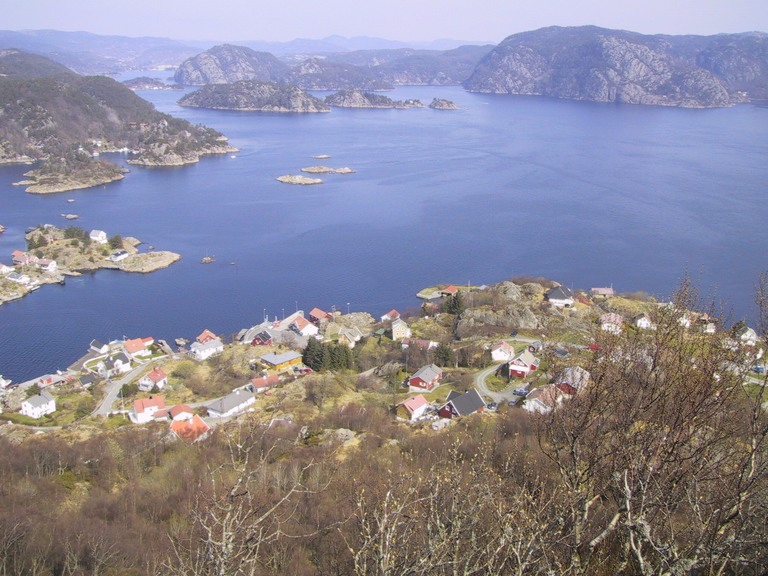
- Main buildings seen from Nonsknuten. North is up in the picture, and Flekkefjord lies between the mountains.
- Interactive map of the island

Geography
- Location: Agder, Norway
- Coordinates: 58.2180°N 06.6820°E
- Area: 4.7 km^{2} (1.8 sq mi)
- Length: 4 km (2.5 mi)
- Width: 2 km (1.2 mi)
- Highest elevation: 206 m (676 ft)
- Highest point: Brendøyknuten

Administration
- Norway
- County: Agder
- Municipality: Flekkefjord Municipality

Demographics
- Population: 100 (2015)

Andabeløya is a populated island in Flekkefjord Municipality in Agder county, Norway. The 4.7-square-kilometre (1.8 sq mi) island lies at the mouth of the Fedafjorden, just east of the island of Hidra. The one village on the island is called Andabeløy.

The island is very mountainous and rugged. All the island's population lives in the village of Andabeløy, located at the relatively flat northern end of the island. In 2015, there were about 100 residents living on the island. The island is connected to the mainland by a ferry at the north end of the island.

== See also ==
- List of islands of Norway
