= Fedora (disambiguation) =

A fedora is a type of hat.

Fedora may also refer to:

== Arts, entertainment, and media ==
- Fedora (1913 film), an Italian silent film
- Fedora (1918 film), a film directed by Edward José
- Fedora (1926 film), a German silent film
- Fedora (1942 film), an Italian film starring Luisa Ferida and Amedeo Nazzari
- Fedora (1978 film), a film by Billy Wilder
- Fedora (opera), an 1898 opera by Umberto Giordano
- Fédora, an 1882 play by Victorien Sardou
- "Fedora" (short story), an 1895 short story by Kate Chopin
- Fédora, one of writer Italo Calvino's fictional Invisible Cities
- Fedora Tchecoff, a character from Une mort suspecte, a short story by Pierre Boulle

== Computing ==
- Fedora Linux, a Linux distribution
  - Fedora Project, the development project for the operating system
- Fedora Commons, digital repository Java software by DuraSpace

== People ==
- Fedora (KGB agent), the codename for the Soviet Cold War double agent Aleksei Kulak
- Fedora Barbieri (1920–2003), Italian mezzo-soprano
- Larry Fedora (born 1962), American football coach
- Walt Fedora (1918–1968), American football player
- Fedora, feminine form of the Russian given name Fyodor

== Places ==
- Fedorah, Alberta, a locality in Canada
- Fedora, South Dakota, United States
