= Feda Church =

Church in Agder, Norway

- Feda kirke
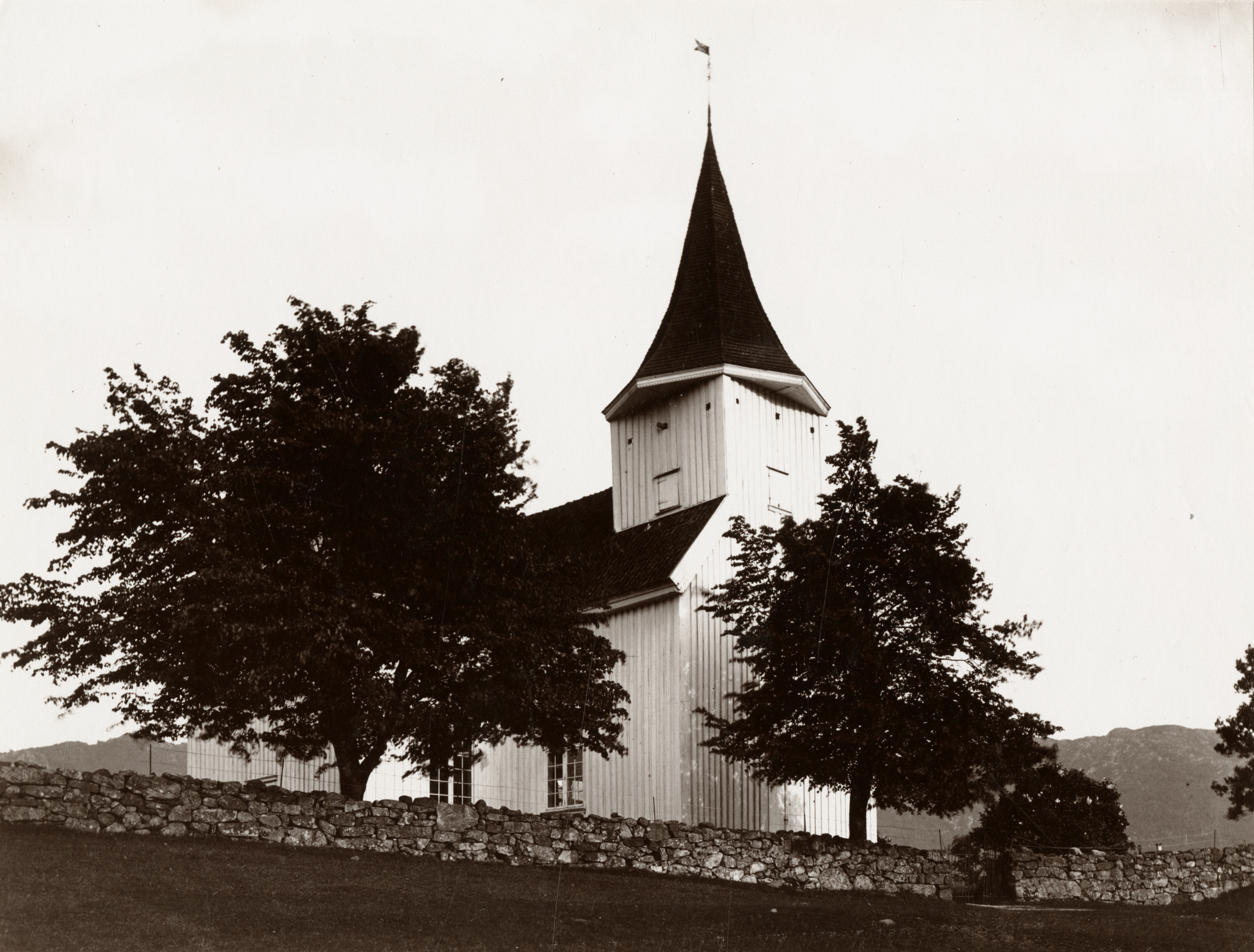
- View of the church
- Feda Church
- 58.2629°N 06.8199°E
- Location: Kvinesdal Municipality, Agder
- Country: Norway
- Denomination: Church of Norway
- Previous denomination: Catholic Church
- Churchmanship: Evangelical Lutheran

History
- Status: Parish church
- Founded: 13th-century
- Consecrated: 1802

Architecture
- Functional status: Active
- Architectural type: Cruciform
- Style: Empire style
- Completed: 1802; 224 years ago

Specifications
- Capacity: 240
- Materials: Wood

Administration
- Diocese: Agder og Telemark
- Deanery: Lister og Mandal prosti
- Parish: Feda
- Norwegian Cultural Heritage Site
- Type: Church
- Status: Automatically protected
- ID: 84119

Feda Church (Norwegian: Feda kirke) is a parish church of the Church of Norway in Kvinesdal Municipality in Agder county, Norway. It is located in the village of Feda, on the shore of the Fedafjorden. It is the church for the Feda parish which is part of the Lister og Mandal prosti (deanery) in the Diocese of Agder og Telemark. The white, wooden church was built in an empire style cruciform design in 1802 using plans drawn up by an unknown architect. The church seats about 240 people.

== History ==
The earliest existing historical records of the church date back to the year 1302, but the church likely existed prior to that time. The medieval church was probably a stave church. In 1593, the old church was torn down and a new timber-framed church with a rectangular nave and a narrower, rectangular chancel. In 1800, the old church was torn down and construction began on a new cruciform church on the same site as the previous building. The new building was consecrated in 1802. In the 1850s, the church received new 2nd floor gallery seating, a new pulpit, an altarpiece, and a baptismal font. In 1854, the cemetery was expanded by 900 square metres (0.22 acres).

== Media gallery ==
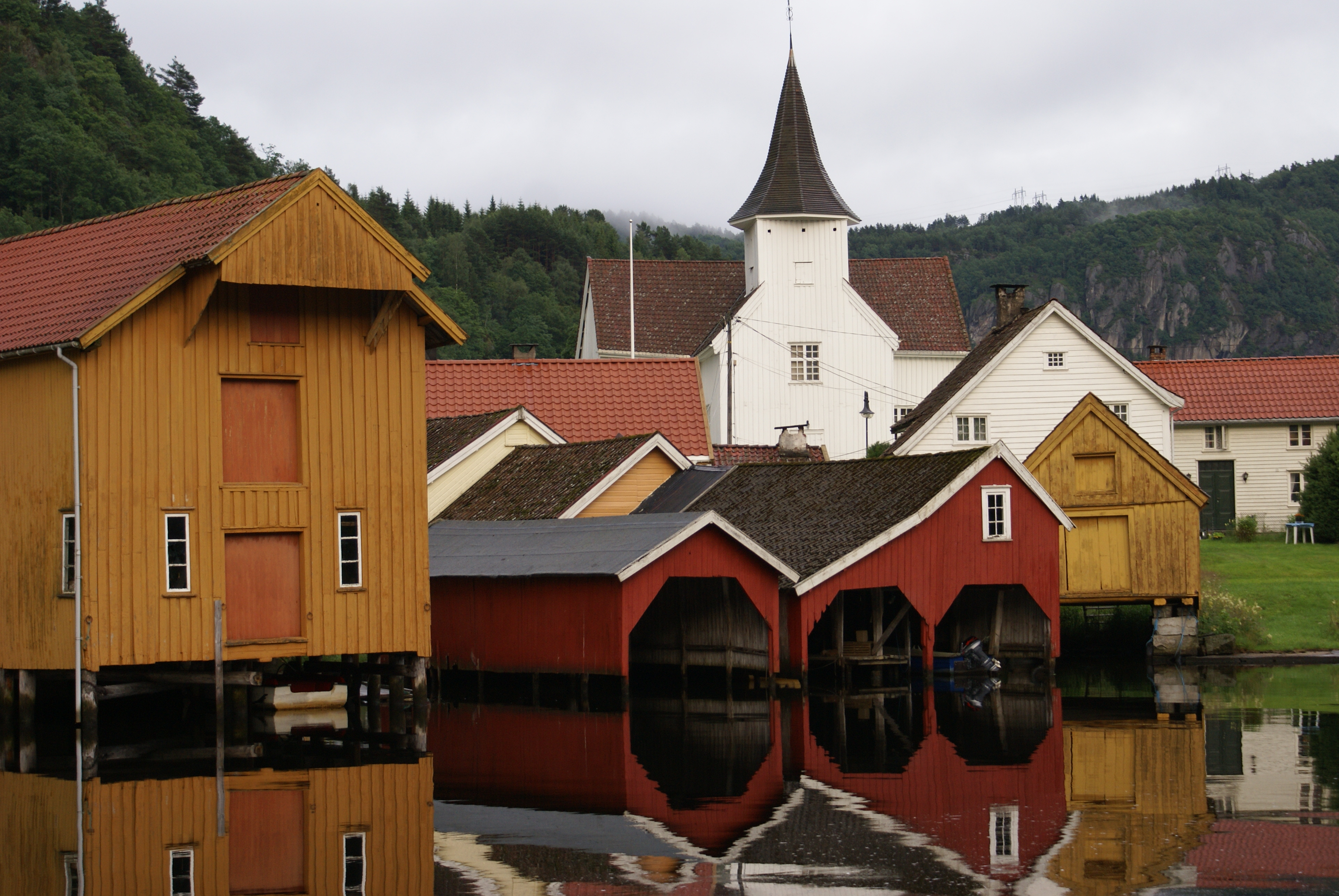

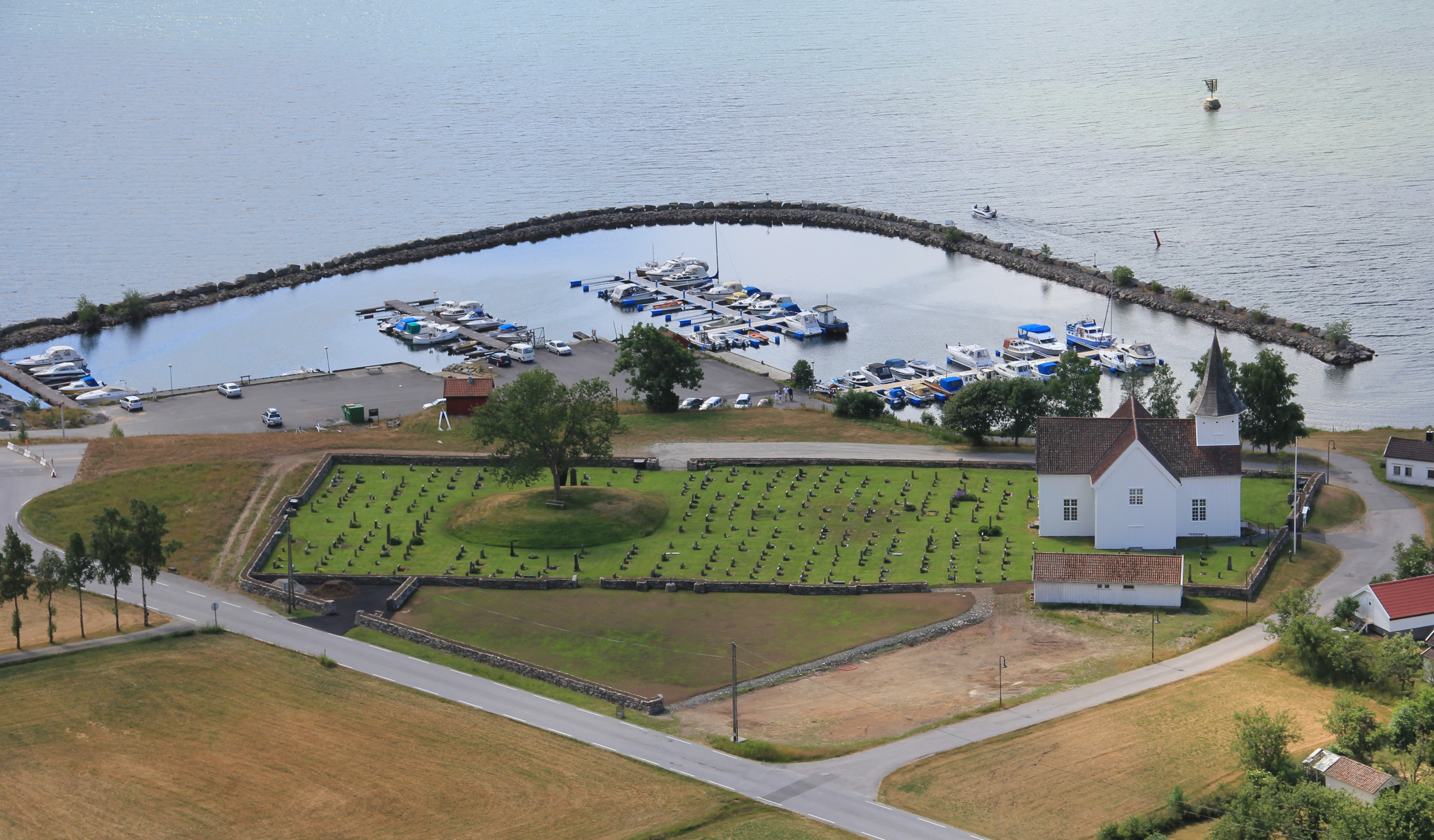

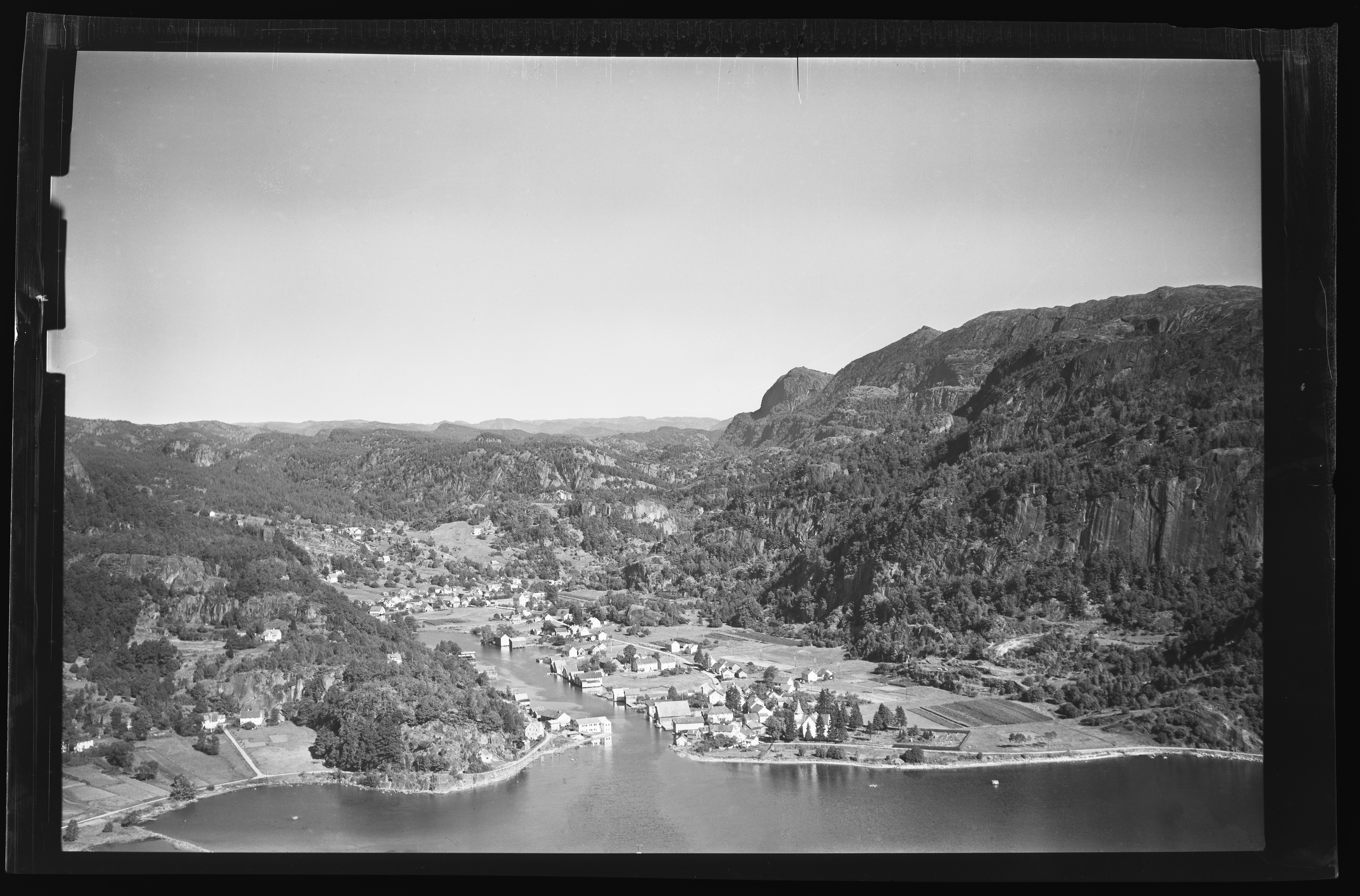

== See also ==
- List of churches in Agder og Telemark
