= Ecuadorian Chess Federation =

Sports governing body in Ecuador

- Sport: Chess
- Jurisdiction: Ecuador
- Abbreviation: FEDA
- Founded: 1939
- Affiliation: FIDE
- Regional affiliation: Confederation of Chess for America
- Headquarters: Estadio Modelo Alberto Spencer Herrera, Guayaquil, Ecuador
- President: Felipe Delgado Jara

Official website
- www.ajedrezenecuador.com
- (Ecuador)

The Ecuadorian Chess Federation (abbreviation FEDA Spanish: Federación Ecuatoriana de Ajedrez) is the national federation of Chess in Ecuador. It promotes chess in Ecuador and represents Ecuadorian players internationally as a FIDE member organization. It organizes the Ecuadorian Chess Championship.

It was founded in 1939 to allow Ecuadorian players to play in the 1939 Chess Olympiad. In 1955 it was finally internally organized with bylaws and a governing structure created. During the COVID-19 pandemic in Ecuador, FEDA organized an online chess tournament to keep Ecuadorian chess players engaged during the pandemic. Its former president Emililo Bastidas controversially registered to personally play in the 2022 Iberian-american tournament in Mexico. This is unusual for national federation officials to do. He also received criticism for not giving enough support to players such as Anahí Ortiz Verdezoto to play in tournaments.
