= Fyodor =

Fyodor, Fedor (Russian: Фёдор) or Feodor is the Russian-language form of the Greek-language name Theodoros (Greek: Θεόδωρος) meaning "God's gift" or "god-given". Fedora (Федора) is the feminine form. "Fyodor" and "Fedor" are two English transliterations of the same Russian name. It may also be a surname.

Notable people with the name include:

== Given names ==
=== Mononymous ===
==== Royalty and nobility ====
- Feodor I of Russia (1557–1598), Tsar
- Feodor II of Russia (1605), Tsar
- Feodor III of Russia (1661–1682), Tsar
- Fyodor of Kiev (fl. 14th century)
- Fyodor Rostislavich, also known as Duke Theodore Rostislavich, Fyodor the Black or Fyodor Chermny (c.1230s – d. 1298), a royal saint of the Russian Orthodox Church

==== Other ====
- Feodor Kuzmich, a.k.a. the Righteous Theodore of Tomsk (died 1864), Russian Orthodox starets

=== Fedor ===
- Fedor Andreev (born 1982), Russian / Canadian figure skater
- Fedor von Bock (1880–1945), German field marshal of World War II
- Fedor Rodichev (1854–1933), Russian politician and lawyer
- Fedor Emelianenko (born 1976), Russian mixed martial arts fighter
- Fedor Flašík (1958–2024), Slovak political marketer
- Fedor Flinzer (1832–1911), German illustrator
- Fedor den Hertog (1946–2011), Dutch cyclist
- Fedor Klimov (born 1990), Russian skater
- Fedor Tyutin (born 1983), Russian ice hockey player

=== Feodor ===
- Feodor Chaliapin (1873–1938), Russian opera singer
- Feodor Vassilyev (1707–1782), whose first wife holds the record for most babies born to one woman

=== Fjodor ===
- Fjodor Xhafa (born 1977), Albanian football player

=== Fyodor ===
- Fyodor Bondarchuk (born 1967), Russian film director, actor, producer, clipmaker, TV host
- Fyodor Dostoevsky (1821–1881), Russian novelist of works including Crime and Punishment
- Fyodor Glinka (1786–1880), Russian poet
- Fyodor Khitruk (1917–2012), Russian animator and animation director
- Fyodor Korsh, Russian impressario, founder of the Korsh Theatre, Moscow
- Fyodor Makhnov (1878–1912), "The Russian Giant"
- Fyodor Smolov (born 1990), Russian footballer
- Fyodor Tertitskiy (born 1988), Russian-born South Korean historian
- Fyodor Tyutchev (1803–1873), Russian poet
- Fyodor Ushakov (1745–1817), Russian naval commander
- Fyodor Zakharov (1919–1994), Ukrainian painter

== Surnames ==
- Matreya Fedor (born 1997), Canadian actress
- Nicolas Fedor
- Silviu Feodor, Romanian politician, member of parliament since 2020

== Pseudonyms ==
- Lennart Eriksson (born 1956), known by the nickname Fjodor, Swedish musician, bass guitarist of Swedish punk rock band Ebba Grön
- Gordon Lyon, also known by his pseudonym Fyodor Vaskovich, American network security expert and author

== Fictional characters ==
- Fyodor Vostrikov or father Fyodor, a character from The Twelve Chairs, a 1928 Russian picaresque novel
- Uncle Fyodor, nickname of a boy, a character created by Eduard Uspensky first appeared in Uncle Fedya, His Dog, and His Cat, later in the Russian animated film series about events in Prostokvashino
- Fedya, the hoodlum from the first novella of the 1965 Soviet film Operation Y and Shurik's Other Adventures
- Fyodor Dostoyevksy, from the manga and anime series Bungou Stray Dogs

== Other uses ==
- FEDOR, a humanoid robot
- Feodor (German children's TV series), a German animated children's series in 1997 about a fox named Feodor.

== See also ==
- Fyodorov
- Fedir
- Feodora
