= Fyodor Zakharov =

Russian painter

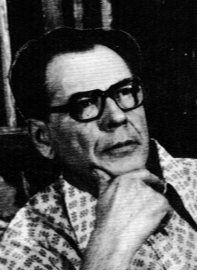
Zakharov in 1986

Fyodor Zakharovich Zakharov (Russian: Фёдор Захарович Захаров; Ukrainian: Федір Захарович Захаров, romanized: Fedir Zakharovych Zakharov; September 5, 1919 – September 29, 1994) was a Soviet and Ukrainian painter. He was awarded the title People's Painter of Ukrainian SSR in 1978, and the Shevchenko National Prize in 1987, the highest Ukrainian award for art and literature.

== Life ==
Zakharov was born on September 5, 1919, in Aleksandrovskoye rural settlement, a little village in the Smolensk Governorate of the Russian Empire (today part of Monastyrshchinsky District, Smolensk Oblast). He descended from a farming family. In 1935, he received a grant to study at the Kalinin Academy of Art in Moscow, where he finished his studies with distinction in 1941. Health problems kept Zakharov from being drafted for military service. He continued his art studies at the Surikov Academy of Art in Moscow. Zakharov was taught as an elite student by Aristarkh V. Lentulov, one of the best known representatives of the Russian avant garde.

Zakharov started his career as an independent artist in 1950. This was the era of the totalitarian Soviet art, during which artistic expression was subordinated entirely to the interests of the Communist Party. Zakharov never created the so-called thematic paintings, which typically idealized the supposedly blissful existence of the Soviet citizenry. The young painter did not choose this path, which would have conformed to the ruling ideological system and would have guaranteed fast recognition and material advantages. Zakharov's art was inspired by the magnificent achievements of the Russian and Ukrainian landscape paintings of the late 19th and early 20th century, which are characterised by the poetization of nature.

Zakharov's landscapes and still lifes were highly admired. The paintings were exhibited in numerous art galleries and reputable museums in Kyiv, Moscow and Saint Petersburg. Zakharov's paintings are greatly valued by collectors in Russia, Ukraine and Western Europe.

Zakharov was particularly attracted to two landscapes: Crimea, where he lived, and the village of Sedniv, close to Chernihiv, where he often traveled to paint. Taras Shevchenko, the great Ukrainian painter and poet, stayed often at the Lyzohub manor in Sedniv during the 1840s.

Fyodor Zakharovich Zakharov died after a long illness in Yalta on September 29, 1994, and is buried there.

In 2016 the personal exhibition of Fedor Zakharov was opened in the Hall of Yalta's Union of Artists, Crimea. The Large catalogue of his paintings was also presented during the grand opening.

== Work ==
Prof. Olga Zhbankova, head of the department of contemporary Ukrainian art of the National Art Museum describes the work of Zakharov: "Zakharov's art was inspired by the magnificent achievements of the Russian and Ukrainian landscape paintings of the late 19th and early 20th century, which are characterised by the noble poetisation of nature. His paintings are based on the harmonic combination of impressionistic sentiment and illustrative painting. The freedom and naturalness of the composition combines organically with the expressiveness of the generalized forms and the strength of the harmony of light. The painter images the form of an item easily with the wide pastous stroke of his brush, reproducing the peculiarity of his fracture and the harmony of air and light."

== Exhibitions ==
- Moscow, 1953 (catalogue Moscow, 1954)
- Simferopol, Crimea, 1954 (catalogue Simferopol, 1954)
- All-Union Exhibition, Moscow, 1954 (catalogue Moscow, 1955)
- All-Union Exhibition, Moscow, 1955 (catalogue Moscow, 1955)
- Simferopol, 1957 (catalogue Moscow, 1957)
- Kyiv, 1957 (catalogue Kyiv, 1957)
- Moscow, 1957 (catalogue Moscow)
- Moscow, 1957 (catalogue Moscow)
- Yalta, 1958, (catalogue Kyiv)
- Soviet Union, 1958, (catalogue Kyiv)
- Leningrad, 1959, (catalogue Moscow)
- Simferopol, 1960 (catalogue Simferopol, 1960)
- Kyiv, 1960 (catalogue Kyiv)
- Moscow, 1960 (catalogue Kyiv)
- Kyiv, 1961 (catalogue Kyiv)
- Moscow, 1962 (catalogue Moscow)
- Kyiv, Moscow, 1964 Shevtchenko (catalogue Kyiv)
- Crimea, 1964 (catalogue Kyiv)
- Kyiv, 1965 (catalogue Kyiv)
- Ukraine, 1967 (catalogue Kyiv)
- Kyiv, 1968 (catalogue Kyiv)
- Simferopol, 1969 (catalogue)
- Crimea, 1970 (catalogue)
- Simferopol, 1970 (catalogue)
- Kyiv, 1971 (catalogue)
- Simferopol, 1971(catalogue)
- Kyiv, 1971 (catalogue Kyiv)
- Kyiv, 1972, (catalogue Kyiv)
- Moscow, 1972–1973 (catalogue Moscow)
- Kyiv, 1974 (catalogue Kyiv)
- Kyiv, 1976 (catalogue Kyiv)
- Kyiv, 1977 (catalogue Kyiv)
- Kyiv, 1978 (catalogue Kyiv, 1980)
- Kyiv (catalogue Kyiv 1980)
- Kyiv, 1979 (catalogue Kyiv)
- Kyiv, 1979 (catalogue Kyiv)
- Kyiv, 1980 (catalogue Kyiv)
- Kyiv, 1980 (catalogue Kyiv, 1981)
- Moscow, 1981 (catalogue Kyiv, 1981)
- Kyiv, 1983 (catalogue Kyiv)
- Kyiv, 1982–1983 (catalogue Kyiv, 1984)
- Kyiv, 1984 (catalogue Kyiv, 1986)
- Moscow, 1984 (catalogue 1984)
- Kyiv, 1985 (catalogue Kyiv, 1986)
- Moscow 1985 (catalogue Moscow, 1985)
- Moscow 1986 (catalogue Moscow)
- Kyiv, 1987 (catalogue Kyiv)
- Munich, 1997 (catalogue Moscow)
- Munich, 1997 (catalogue Kyiv)
- Moscow, 2002, Art of the 20th Century, Tretyakov Gallery, (catalogue Kyiv)
- Kyiv, 2008, (catalogue Kyiv)
- Yalta Exhibition Hall, Crimea, 2016
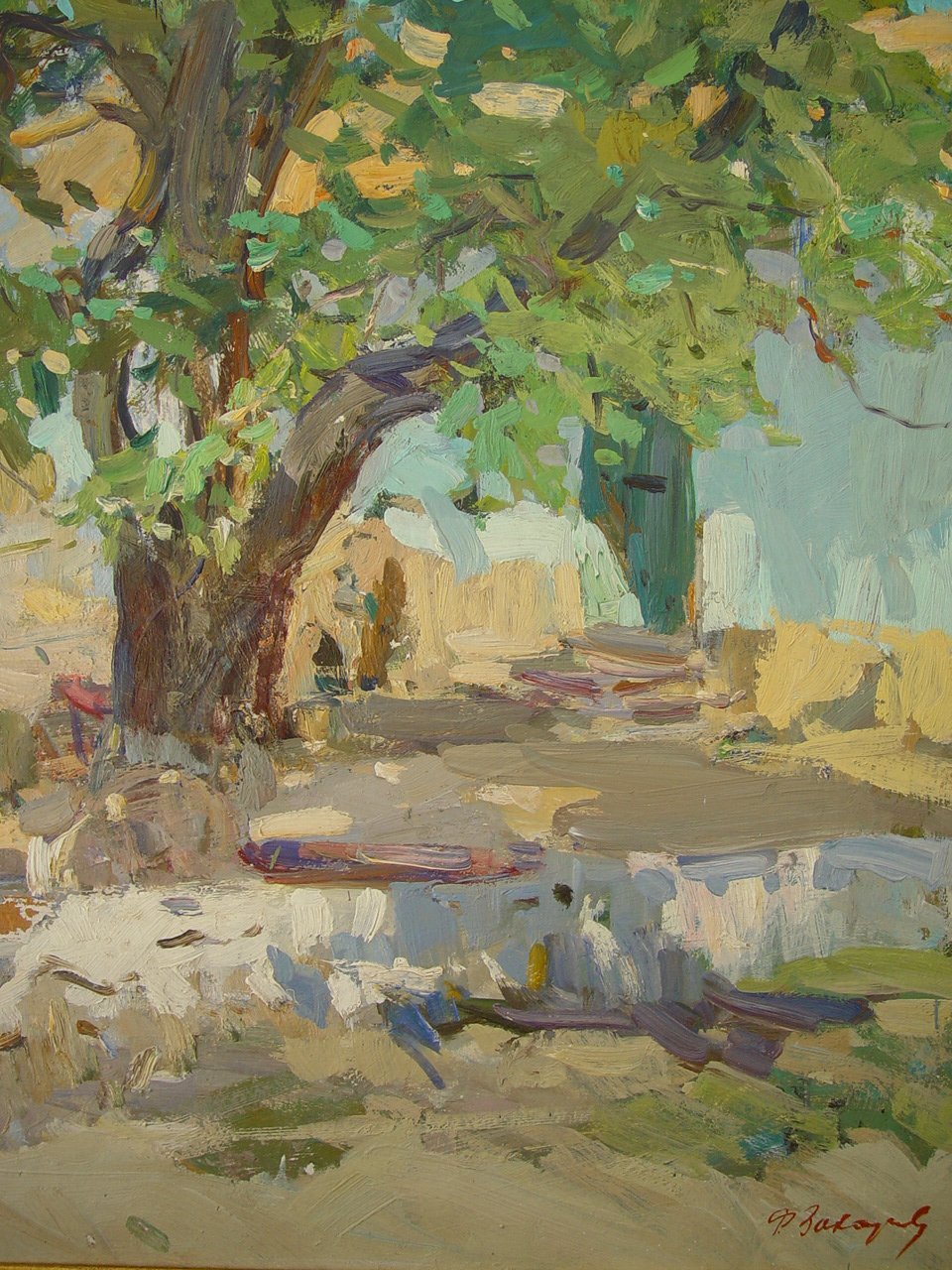
Silent Noon at Alupka, 1958, oil on carton

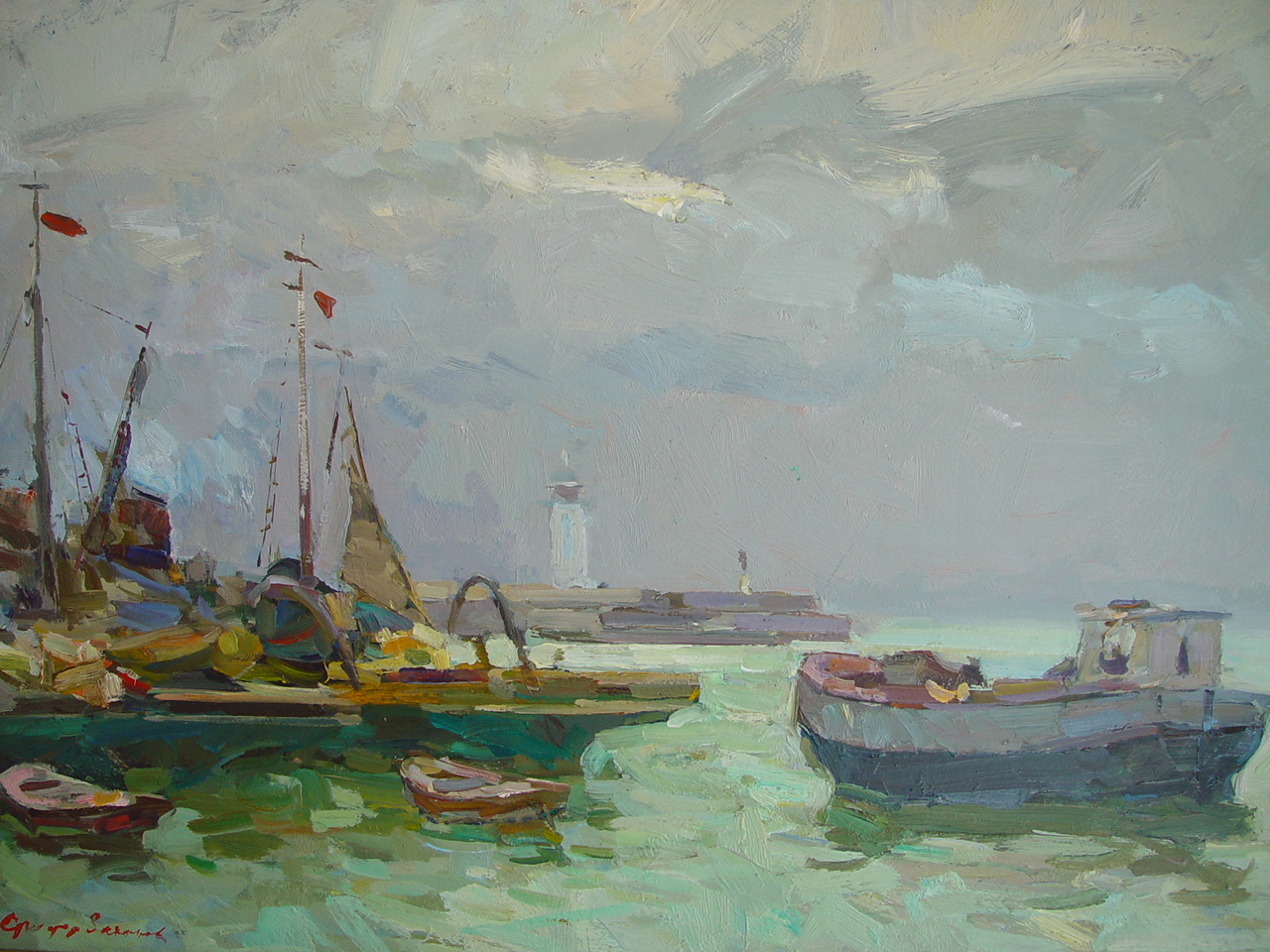
Yalta Port, 1959, oil on carton

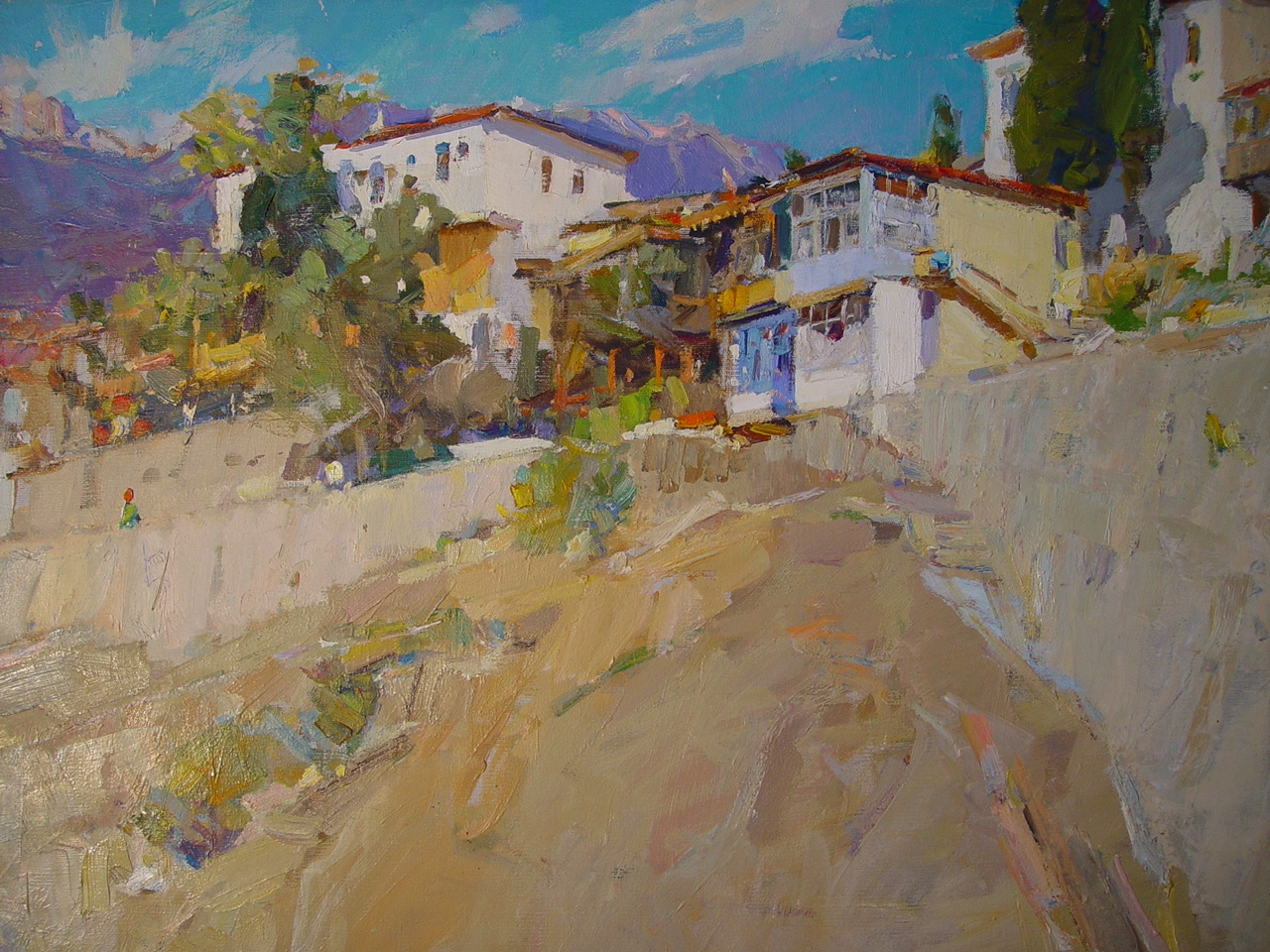
Sunny Day in Gurzuf, 1959, oil on canvas

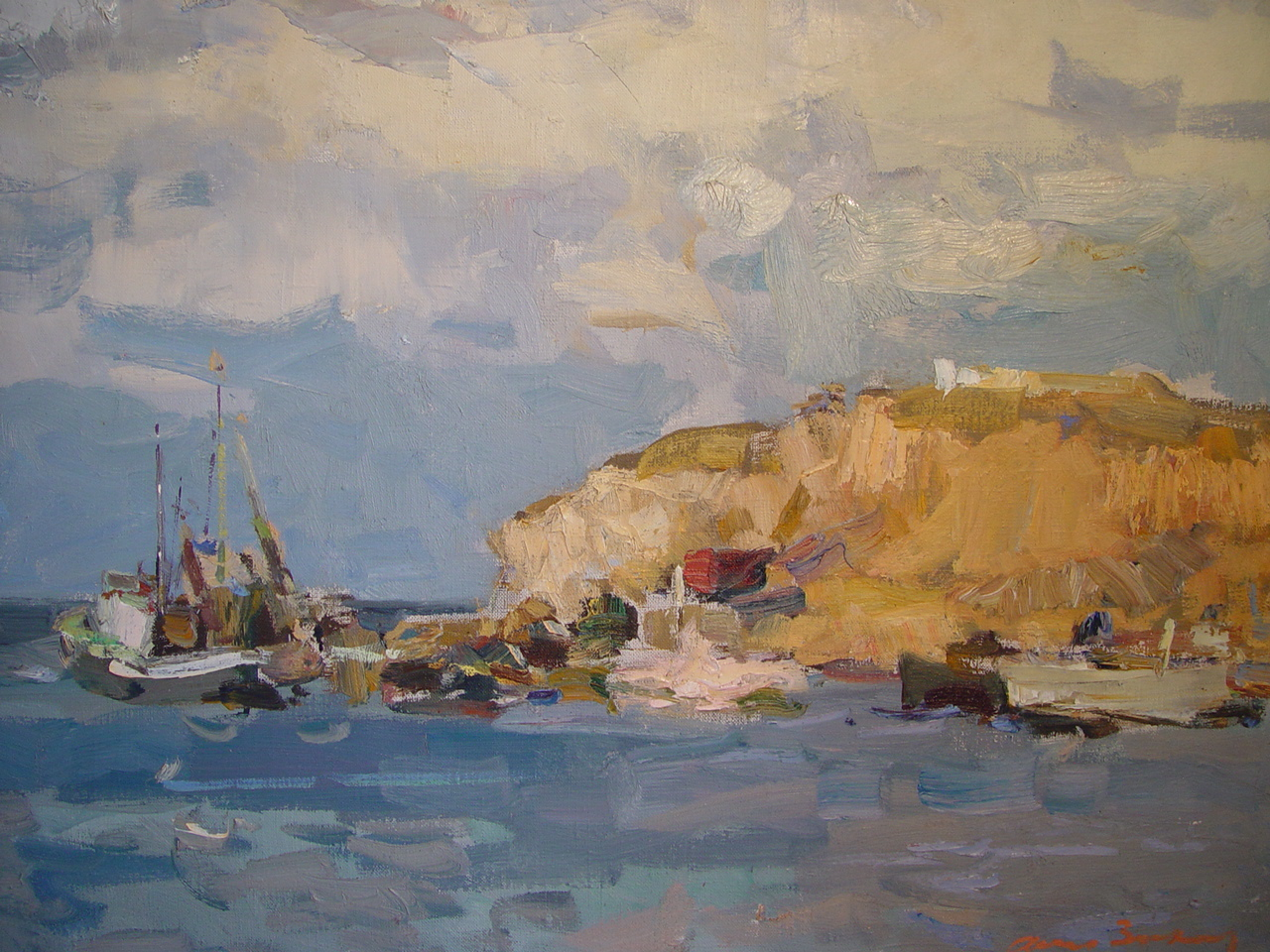
Stormy Wind at Livadiia, 1964, oil on canvas

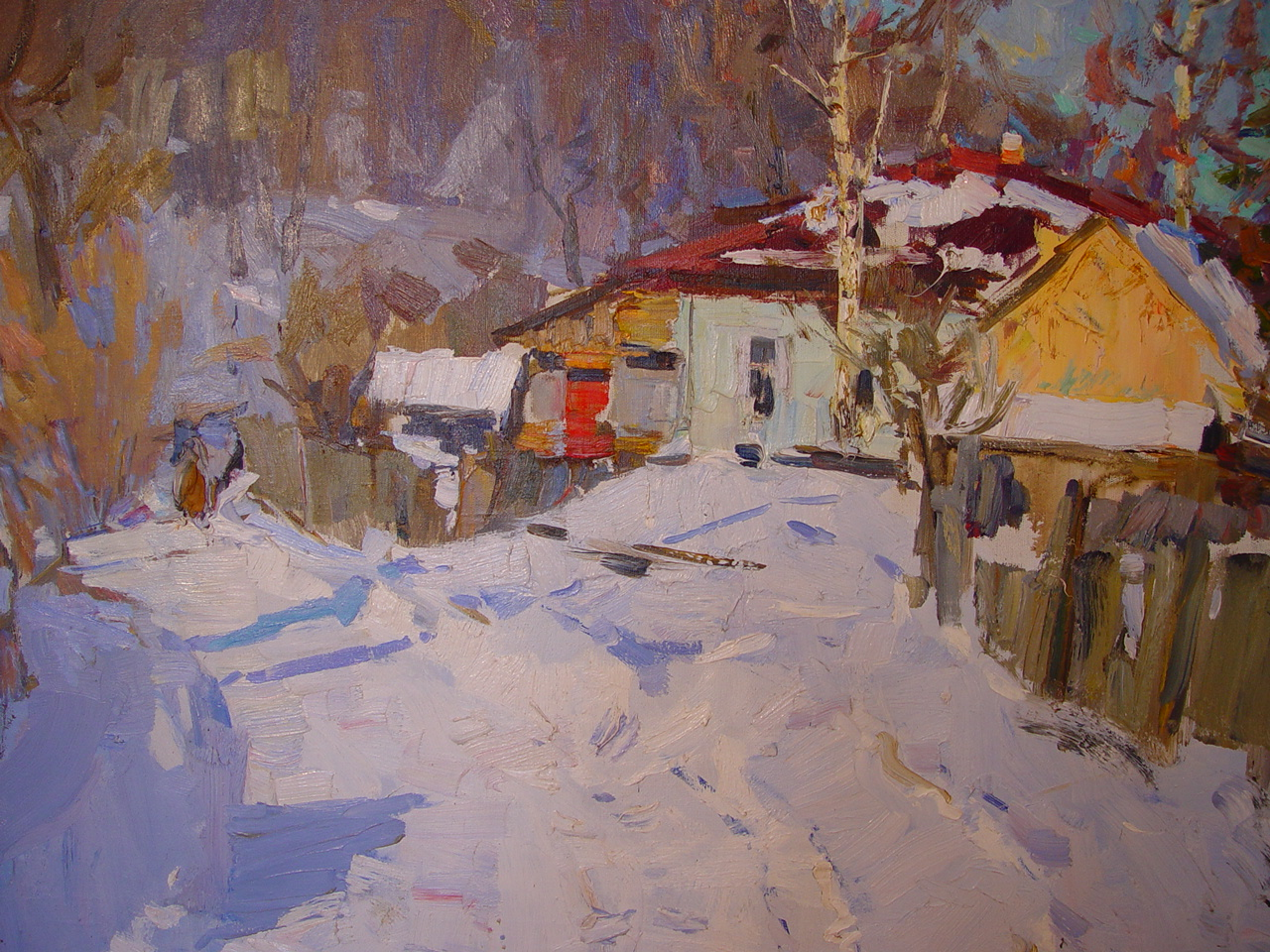
Sunny Day in Sedniv, 1968, oil on canvas

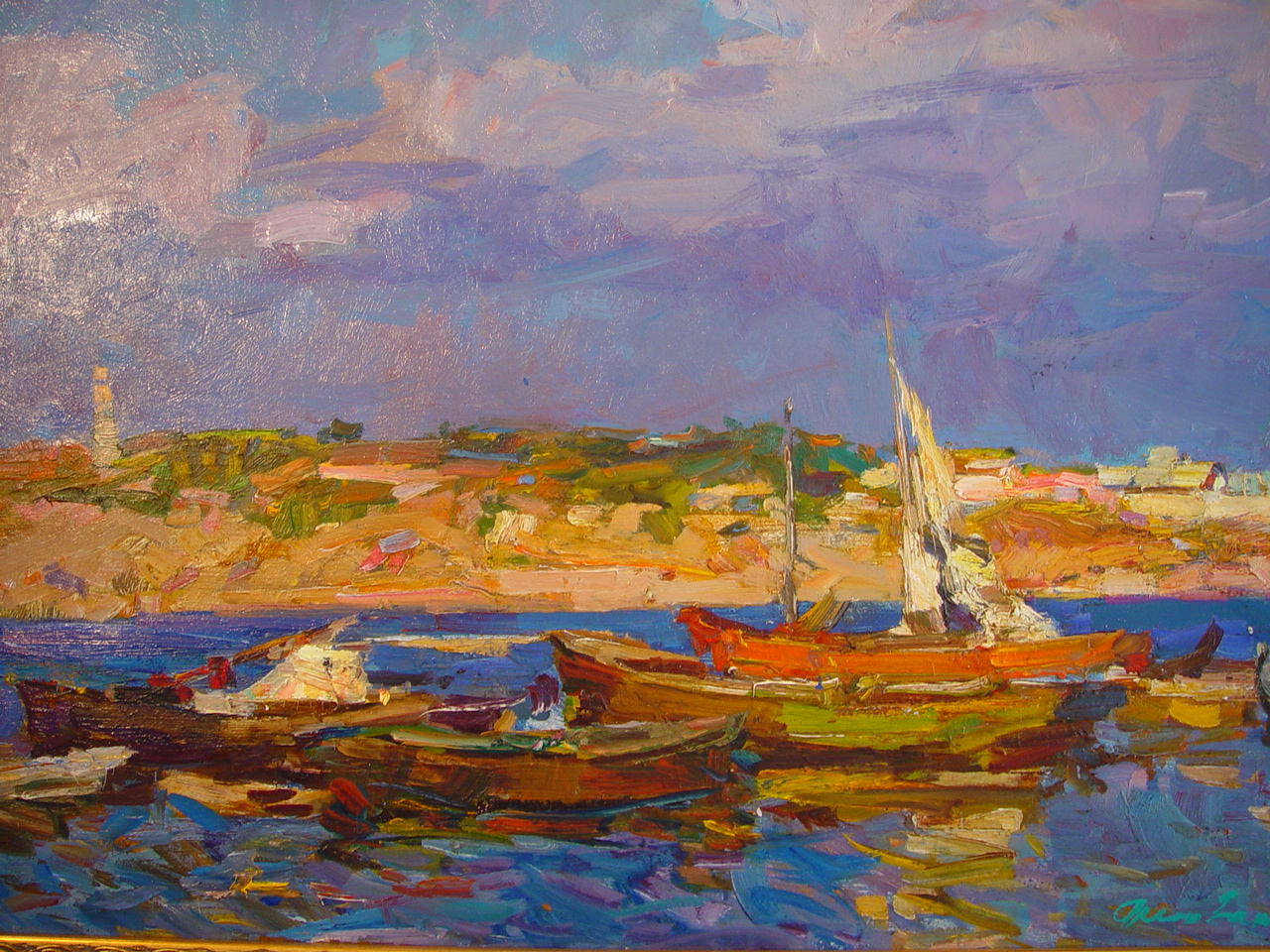
Thunderstorm at Kazantyp, 1975, oil on carton

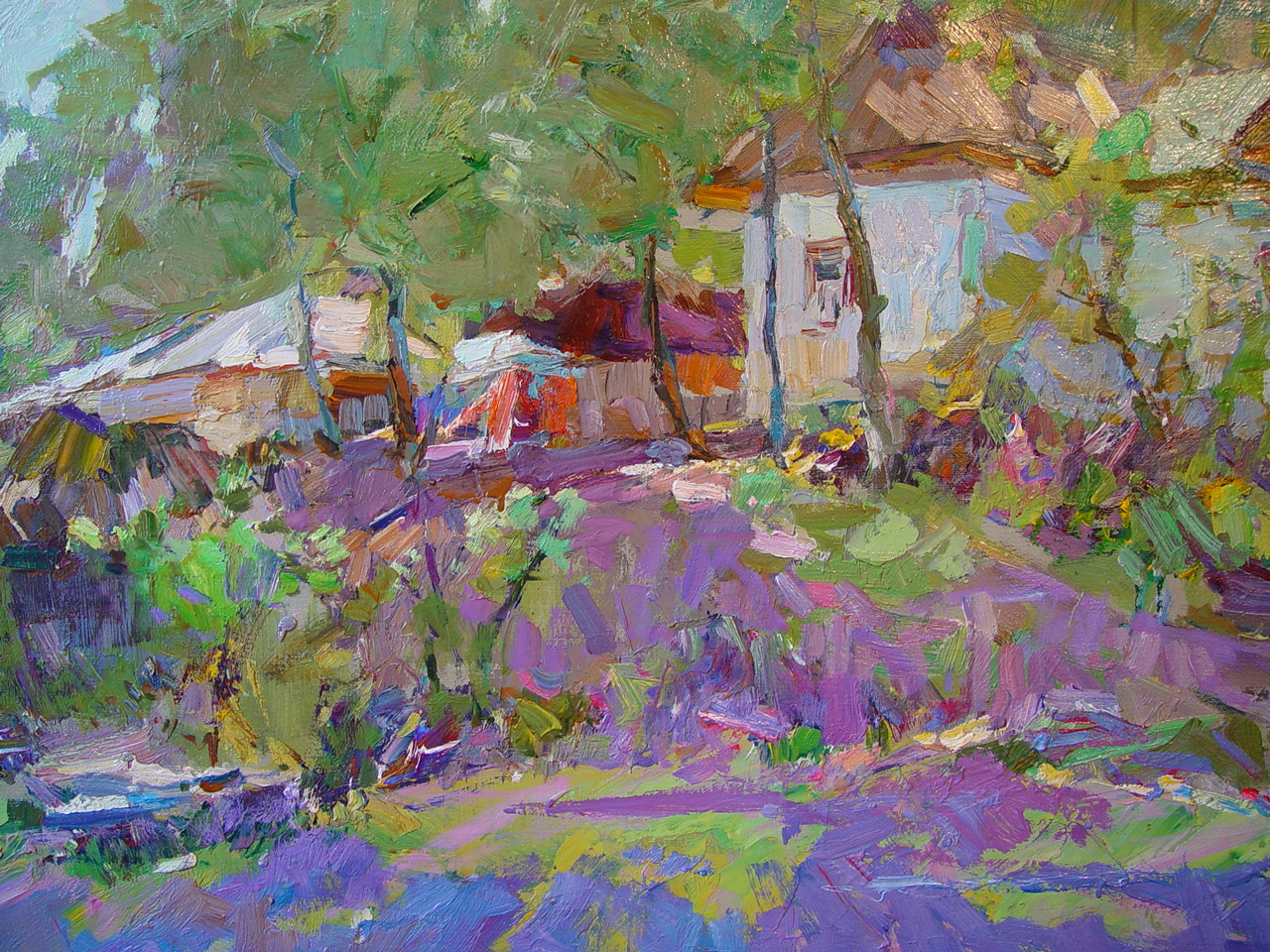
First Spring Green at Aleksanderskoye, 1980, oil on canvas

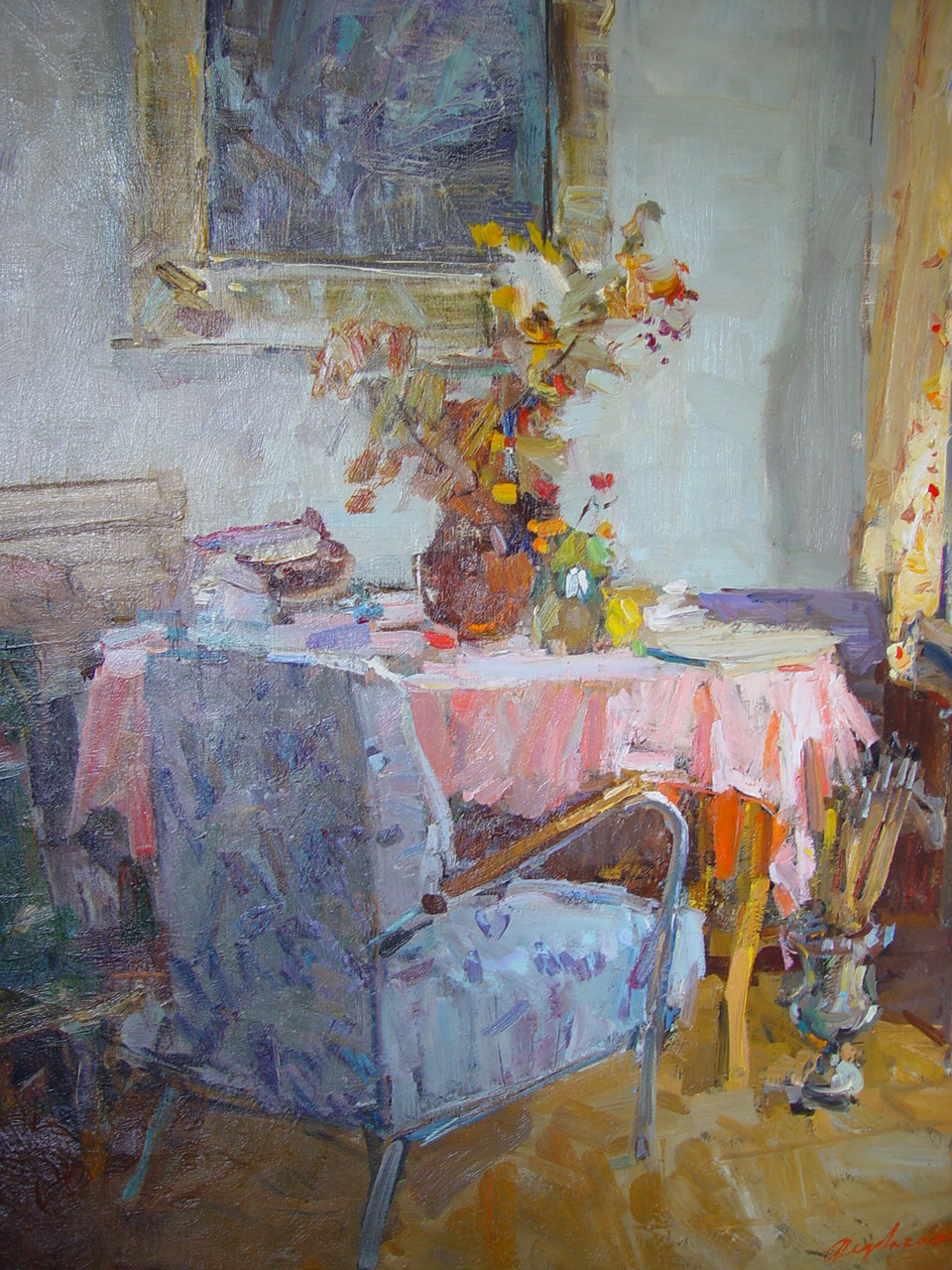
In the Master's Studio, 1960, oil on canvas

== Literature ==
- Contemporary art in Russia, Index, Russian National Library.
