= Uncle Fedya, His Dog, and His Cat =

Russian children's book by Eduard Uspensky

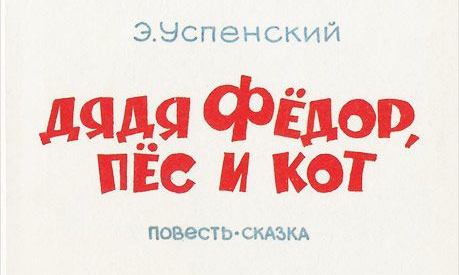
- The 1992 edition, published by Angstrem.
- Author: Eduard Uspensky
- Original title: Дядя Фёдор, пёс и кот
- Translator: Michael Henry Heim
- Language: Russian
- Series: The Stories from Prostokvashino
- Genre: novella
- Set in: Soviet Union
- Publication date: 1974
- Publication place: Soviet Union
- English publication date: 1993
- Pages: 112
- Followed by: Uncle Fyodor's Aunt (1994)

Uncle Fedya, His Dog, and His Cat (Russian: Дядя Фёдор, пёс и кот, romanized: Dyadya Fyodor, pyos i kot, lit. '"Uncle Fyodor, The Dog and The Cat"') is a children's novella written by Eduard Uspensky and first published in 1974. It is the first story in the series set in the fictional village of Milkville (Russian: Простоквашино, romanized: Prostokvashino, IPA: [prəstɐˈkvaʂɨnə]; lit."soured milk–ville") created by Uspensky. The series features a city boy named Fyodor, or Fedya for short, and his friends, the talking animals. The stories focus on their adventures in Prostokvashino and their relationships with its residents, including the irritable postman Pechkin.

In 1993 it was translated from Russian by Michael Henry Heim with illustrations by Vladimir Shpitalnik.

== Plot ==
Fyodor lives in the apartment with his parents, who call him "Uncle" (a Russian designation for adult males) because of his seriousness, independence, and intelligence. He learns to read at 4, and starts cooking for himself at 6. Unlike his mother, he is very fond of animals. One day he meets a stray talking cat, who used to spend his nights in the apartment building's attic but has nowhere to live now due to the repair works going on in the building. Fyodor takes the cat home, but his mother doesn't let him keep it, so the boy decides to run away and take his cat with him. The next day, they leave a note to Fyodor's parents and take a bus to a rural area. Fyodor names the cat Matroskin. They arrive in a village called Prostokvashino (lit. Soured milk village), and settle in an empty house. A talking dog named Sharik promises to guard their new house, so they all start living together.

The next day they go swimming and on their way back meet with curious Pechkin the Postmaster. He insists that they subscribe to something. Fyodor chooses Murzilka, Sharik opts for "something about hunting" and Matroskin politely refuses, saying that he would rather save money.

Fyodor's parents miss their son and begin looking for him. They publish a missing person classified ad in the newspaper. Meanwhile, Matroskin decides to buy a cow, but they do not have any money. Fyodor suggests that they look for a buried treasure in the forest. They walk to the forest, find a hill with a cave, and Fyodor starts digging nearby. He indeed finds a chest with money and jewels. They all decide to buy presents for themselves. Sharik wants a gun for hunting and a dog collar with medallions; Matroskin needs a cow (he decides to rent one from the local rental service agency); Fyodor wants to buy a bike, but his friends convince him to get a tractor instead, because it is much more practical.

He sends a letter to a tractor factory and encloses 100 rubles, requesting a small tractor which "needs little gas and runs fast". In return, Fyodor receives an experimental 20-hp tractor model "Mitya", which runs on food rather than gasoline. His tractor stops next to every house whenever it smells food, so Matroskin has to force it to move on a straight line by holding a sausage on a fishing-rod in front of it.

People from Prostokvashino begin to like Uncle Fyodor, because he is hard-working and friendly with animals. The villagers bring him stray and sick animals, including a small gloomy jackdaw named Jack Grabbit, that they adopt. After Fedya discovers from Pechkin the Postmaster that his parents are concerned about him, he decides to send them a letter. He starts by writing that his life in Prostokvashino is great, but then abandons his task to play with some children, leaving Matroskin and Sharik to continue the letter. They add pieces of their own information, such as "my paws ache sometimes", but "I have so much warm milk" that "I don't even want to look at mice. I simply catch them for amusement", and "I started moulting the other day". After receiving this letter, Fyodor's parents begin panicking. They find a mention of Prostokvashino on the postmark and send letters to every Prostokvashino village that they could find on a map. They get a reply from Pechkin.

Meanwhile, Sharik purchases a gun and goes to the forest to hunt. He almost drowns in the process, but is saved by an annoyed beaver. Sharik is very ashamed at being saved by the very animals that he planned to hunt, so he decided to do fishing instead. However, Sharik becomes depressed because he couldn't satisfy his hunting instinct by shooting from the gun. Fedya eventually presents him with a camera gun for wildlife photography. Matroskin's cow, Murka (popular female cat's name. lit. purring cat) gives birth to a black calf Gavryusha.

Summer is over, and everyone goes about their own business. Sharik spends all his time in the forest enjoying photography, Matroskin trains Gavryusha in obedience, teaches him to play fetch with sticks and guard the house like a watch dog. Uncle Fyodor catches a serious cold, and Matroskin and Sharik could not help him in any way. Suddenly Fedya's parents arrive and his mother takes care of the boy with Matroskin's assistance, while his father and Sharik take the tractor "Mitya" and drive to the city to buy antibiotics. Fyodor however is still very ill and must return to the city. Fyodor's mother is impressed with Matroskin's skills and intelligence and invites him and Sharik back to their apartment, but the pair is unwilling to part with Murka and Gavryusha. Matroskin suggests that Fyodor should come visit them on school holidays and at weekends.

== Adaptations ==
=== Studio Ekran's film series ===
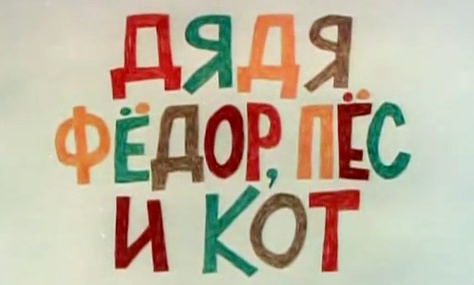
The film title screen.

Uncle Fedya, His Dog, and His Cat was adapted into the animated film trilogy with the same name by Studio Ekran. Studio Ekran released three short films, Matroskin and Sharik (Russian: Матроскин и Шарик) in 1975, Mitya and Murka (Russian: Митя и Мурка) in 1976, and Mom and Dad (Russian: Мама и Папа) in 1976. The series was directed by Yury Klepatsky and Lidia Surikova with the music composed by Anatoly Bykanov. The films were narrated by A. Mikhailov with characters voiced by Victor Baikov, Svetlana Kharlap, A. Gorunova, A. Verbitsky, Z. Andreyeva, Y. Khromova. Among the animators were Olga Anashkina, Boris Savin, A. Abadkina, N. Bazeltseva, Vladimir Kadukhin. These films are largely forgotten nowadays, put in the shade by the much more popular series created at the Soyuzmultfilm studio.

=== Soyuzmultfilm's film series ===
Soyuzmultfilm made three films set in Prostokvashino, all directed by Vladimir Popov. Only the first one, The Three from Prostokvashino (1978), is based on the book. The other two films, School Holidays in Prostokvashino (1980) and Winter in Prostokvashino (1984) have original screenplays written by Eduard Uspensky. He later incorporated some of those plots into his Prostokvashino novellas. All three films received critical praise and were very popular in the Soviet Union. They were praised for their "realism", "recognizable characters and situations" and for the fact that they appealed to adults as well as children. Oleg Tabakov's performance as Matroskin the Cat became especially famous.

== Characters ==
=== Fedya ===
Uncle Fyodor (Russian: Дядя Фёдор), or Fedya for short ("Fedya" is a hypocorism of the Russian given name Fyodor) is the main character of the series. At the beginning of the first book he lives in the city with his parents Dima and Rimma. He likes animals, and often brings stray animals home to the disapproval of his mother who won't let him keep any pets. After meeting and yet another argument with his parents, he decides to leave home. At the end of Uncle Fedya, His Dog, and His Cat Fyodor's mother takes a liking to Matroskin the Cat.

Uncle Fyodor is voiced by Maria Vinogradova in Soyuzmultfilm's series. His hair is blond in Ekran's films and red in Soyuzmultfilm's film series.

=== Matroskin the Cat ===
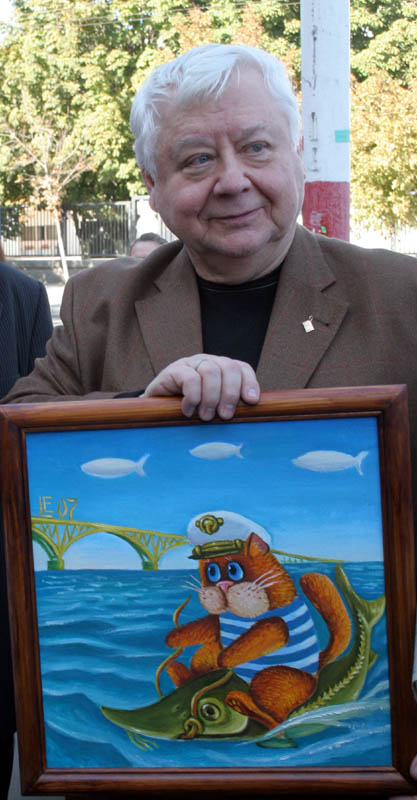
The voice actor Oleg Tabakov holding the painting of Matroskin the Cat, presented to him (2007).

Matroskin the Cat (Russian: Кот Матроскин, матрос lit. seaman) is an anthropomorphic cat. He has a very money-conscious, sensible, and rational personality, and he looks for financial benefits in everything. He used to live in the capital with the professor who studied the animal language. From professor Syomin, Matroskin learned to understand and speak the human language. He also learned to read, write and count. Matroskin becomes the housekeeper and the farmer in Uncle Fyodor's house. He has many interests and skills, including accounting, embroidery, cooking, baking, sewing, singing, playing the guitar, and reading. He takes care of their home economics. He calls "Matroskin" his "surname". He likes to tease Sharik, but generally treats him well, although he is often upset by Sharik's "uselessness". Matroskin the Cat is voiced by Svetlana Kharlap in Ekran's films and by Oleg Tabakov in Soyuzmultfilm's series.

=== Sharik ===
Sharik (Russian: Шарик lit. small balloon) is an anthropomorphic dog. He is a good-natured stray dog, who had lived in the village before meeting Uncle Fyodor. He learned to speak from the same professor who taught the cat. While guarding professor Syomin's country house, Sharik learned to speak because the professor was writing a Sighthound Dictionary. To Matroskin the Cat's utter disappointed, Sharik does not have many useful skills: he admits that he can only wash the dishes by "licking" them. However he follows the letter of the law, i.e. he has a passport, as opposed to Matroskin who claims that his paws and tail are his identity documents. He is voiced by Lev Durov in Soyuzmultfilm's series.

=== Pechkin the Postman ===
Pechkin (Russian: Печкин, печка lit. oven), or Igor Ivanovich Pechkin, is described as a middle-aged man in a hat. He is the postman in Prostokvashino. He is extremely nosy and thinks that he has the right "to know everything" that is happening in the village. Pechkin is a comical character, who is always being outsmarted by the animals. He is voiced by Boris Novikov in Soyuzmultfilm's series.

=== Jack Grabbit ===
Jack Grabbit (Russian: Хватайка, romanized: Khvatayka from the Russian verb хватать meaning "to snatch" or "to grab") is a small thieving jackdaw. He snatches everything that catches his eye, hides it in the cupboard, and then fiercely protects his "treasures", which is very inconvenient for Fyodor and his friends. Matroskin tries to teach him the human language, but Jack Grabbit only manages to learn one phrase: "Who's there?" Still Matroskin counts that as a success, because he thinks that a well-timed question asked behind the door could scare away the burglars. This idea backfires when Pechkin comes to the house while there's nobody in. After announcing: "This is Pechkin the Postman, I've brought your Murzilka magazine" he is being continuously asked "Who's there?" by Jack Grabbit. This conversation continues for a long time, leading to Pechkin's nervous breakdown, and afterwards Uncle Fyodor has to treat him with tea and candies. Jack Grabbit is voiced by Zinaida Naryshkina in Soyuzmultfilm's series.

=== Murka ===
Murka (Russian: Мурка, a female cat name lit. purry) is a red cow. After Matroskin starts to miss milk and decides to purchase a cow, he comes back from the rental service bureau with a cow that he names Murka. To Sharik's amazement, she eats all the curtains and potted flowers in their house. Fyodor eventually chains her up. Murka is a silly and spoilt animal, but she gives a lot of milk. In fact, Matroskin gets so much milk, that he fills every bucket, jar and even the fish tank with it. After soured milk starts leaking from the tap, he decides to buy a calf, but it turns out to be unnecessary because Murka gives birth to a black calf. They name him Gavryusha (Russian: Гаврюша hypocorism for Gavriil). At the end of Uncle Fedya, His Dog, and His Cat Murka reveals that she can use human language too. When Matroskin asks why she didn't talk before, she replies: "To you? What for?"
