= Feda, Norway =

Village in Kvinesdal Municipality, Norway

Feda
- Village
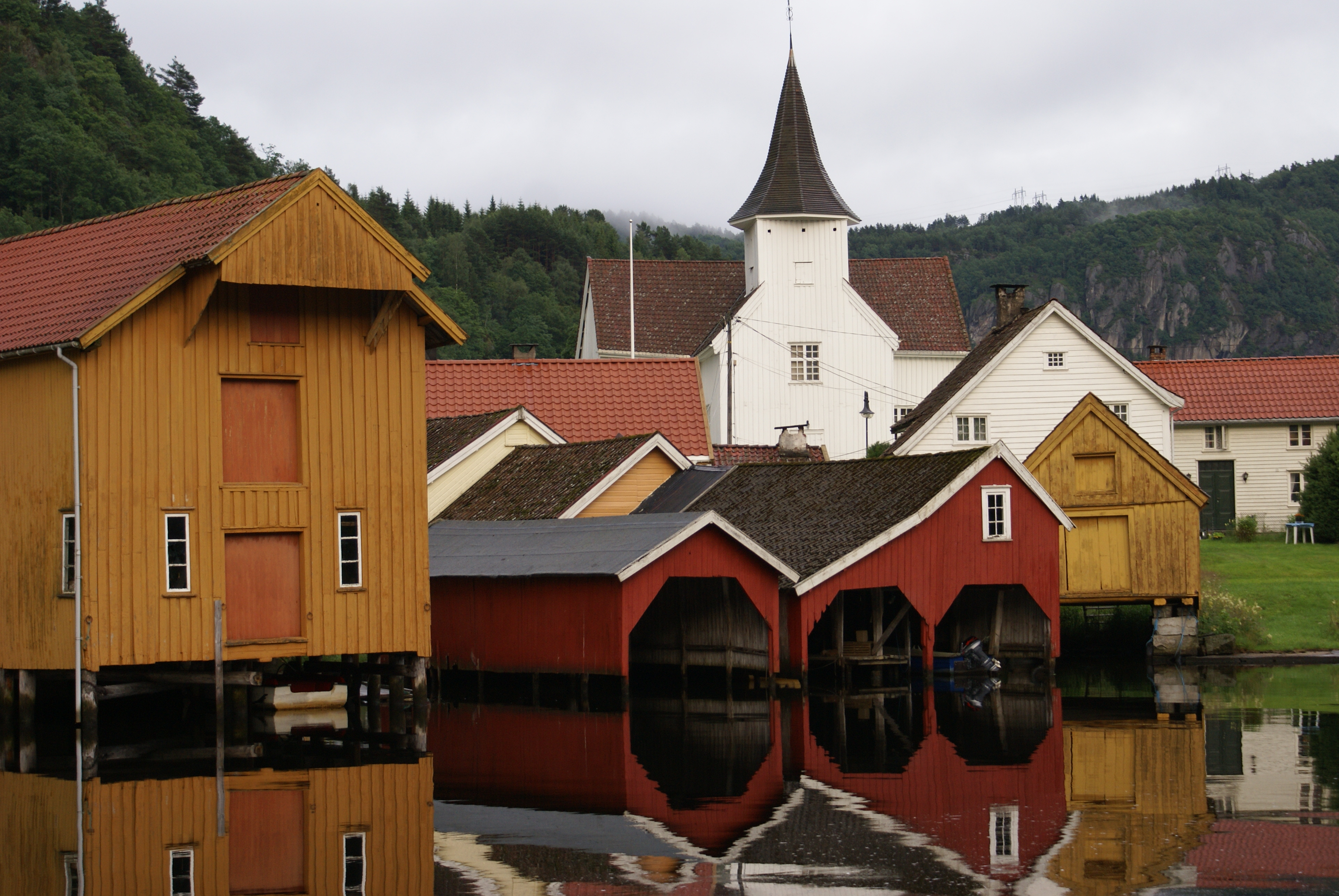
- View of the village
- Interactive map of Feda
- Coordinates: 58.26673°N 6.81994°E
- Country: Norway
- Region: Southern Norway
- County: Agder
- District: Lister
- Municipality: Kvinesdal Municipality

Area
  - Total: 0.53 km^{2} (0.20 sq mi)
- Elevation: 5 m (16 ft)

Population (2026)
  - Total: 457
  - Density: 862/km^{2} (2,230/sq mi)
- Time zone: UTC+01:00 (CET)
  - Summer (DST): UTC+02:00 (CEST)
- Post Code: 4485 Feda

Feda is a village in Kvinesdal Municipality in Agder county, Norway. The village is located on the north side of the Fedafjorden, about 10 kilometres (6.2 mi) southwest of the village of Liknes and about 12 kilometres (7.5 mi) east of the town of Flekkefjord.

The 0.53-square-kilometre (130-acre) village has a population (2026) of 457, giving the village a population density of 862 inhabitants per square kilometre (2,230/sq mi).

The European route E39 highway passes through the village. Feda is home to the static inverter plant of HVDC NorNed. The station was built close to an existing electrical substation. Feda Church is located in the village, serving the southern part of the Kvinesdal Municipality.

== History ==
From 1900 to 1963, the village of Feda was the administrative centre of the old Feda Municipality.

=== Name ===
The municipality (originally the parish) is named after the old "Fede" farm. The name of the farm comes from the river Fedaelva which flows into the Fedafjorden near the farm.

== Media gallery ==
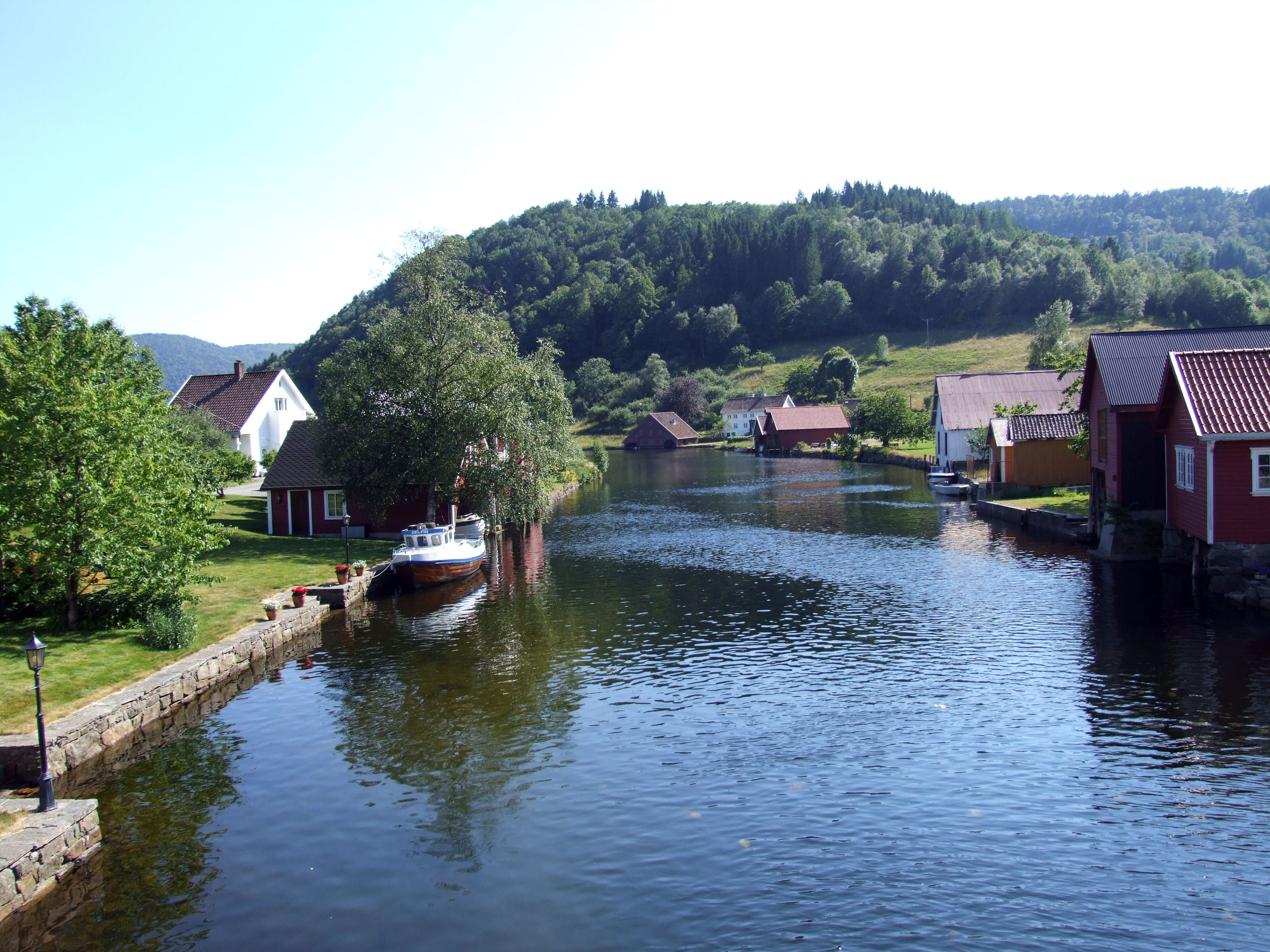
View of Feda from the bridge across the Fedafjorden

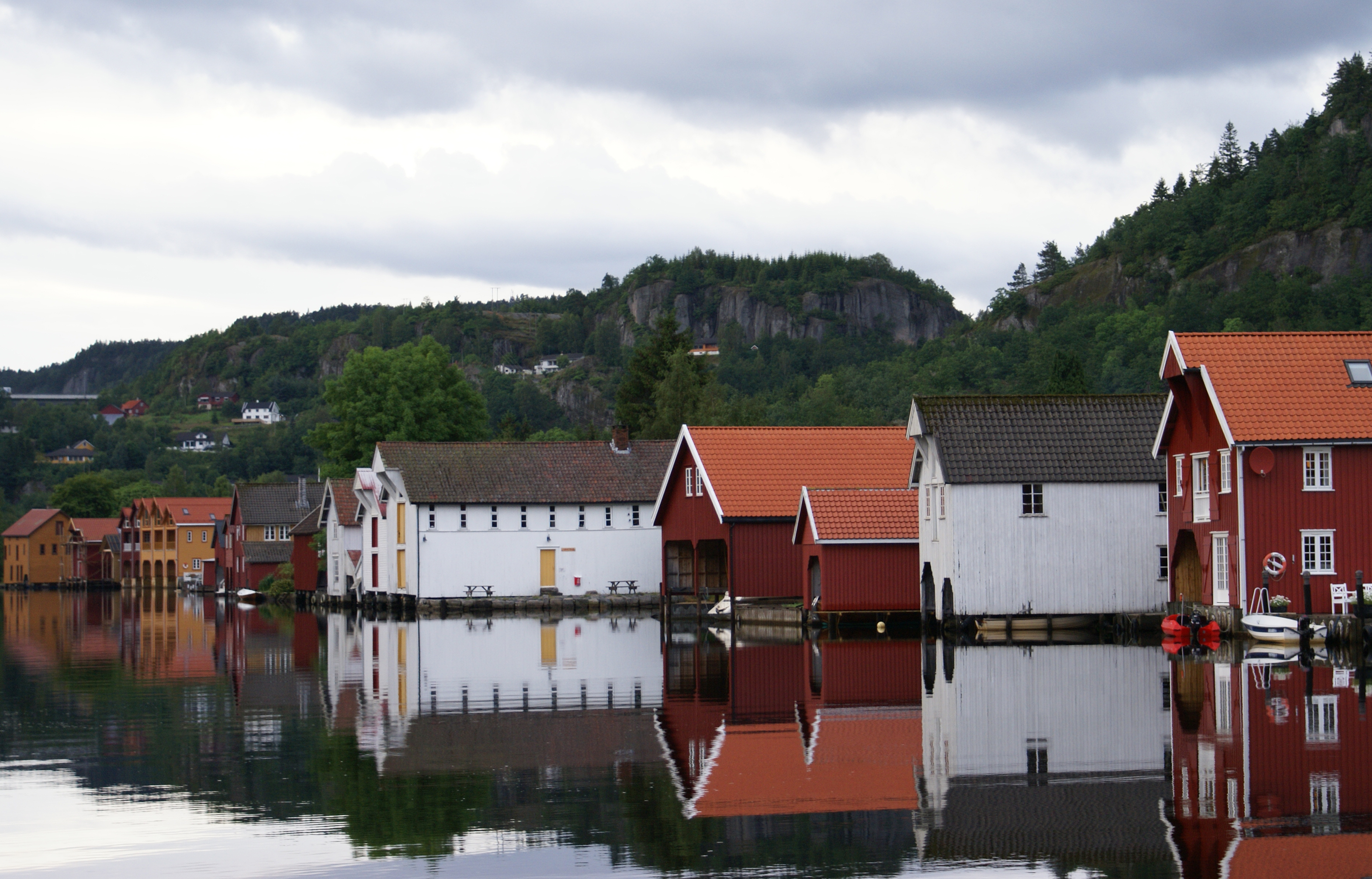
View of Feda

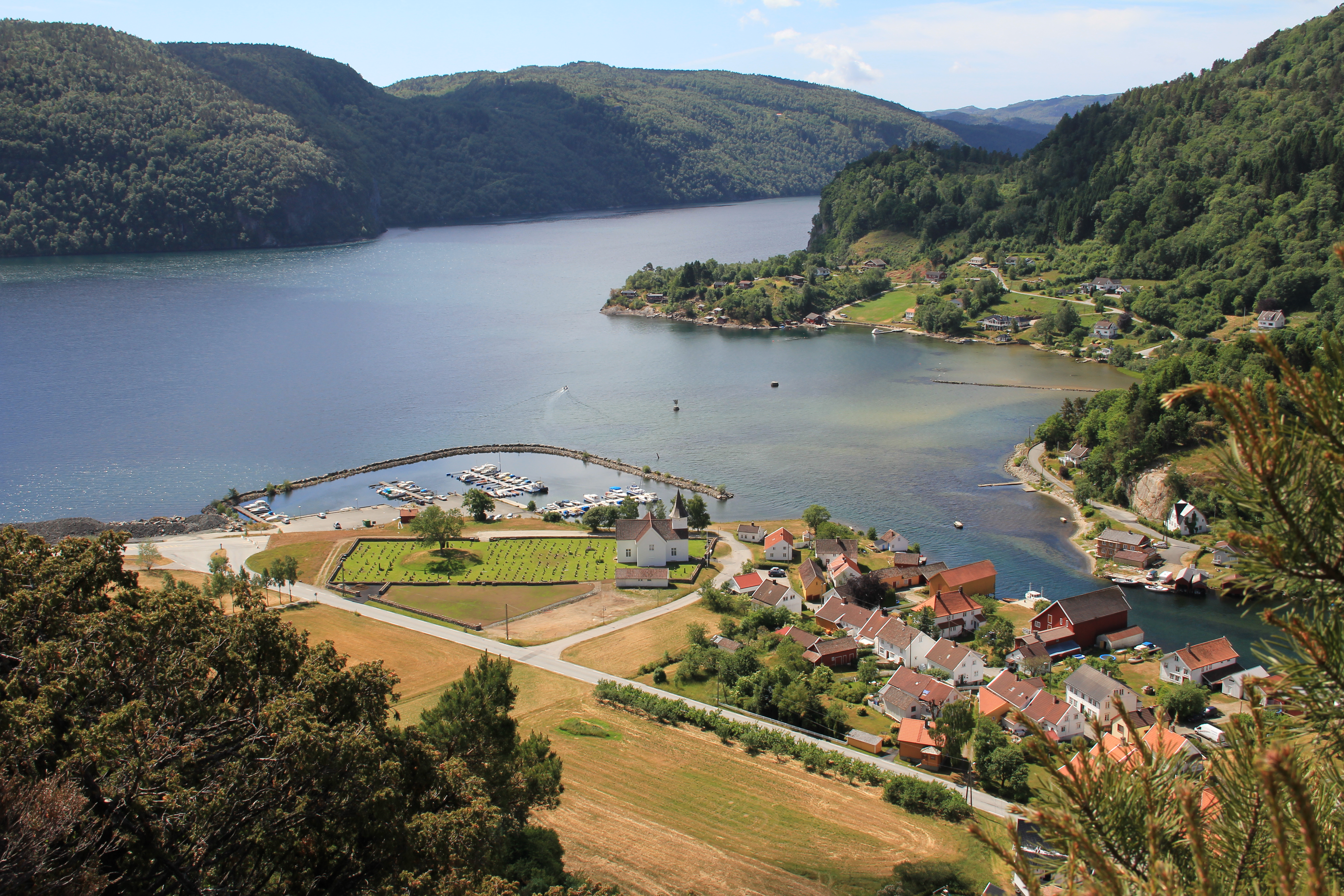
Mouth of the Fedaelva at the Fedafjorden
