= Fedafjorden =

Fjord in Agder, Norway

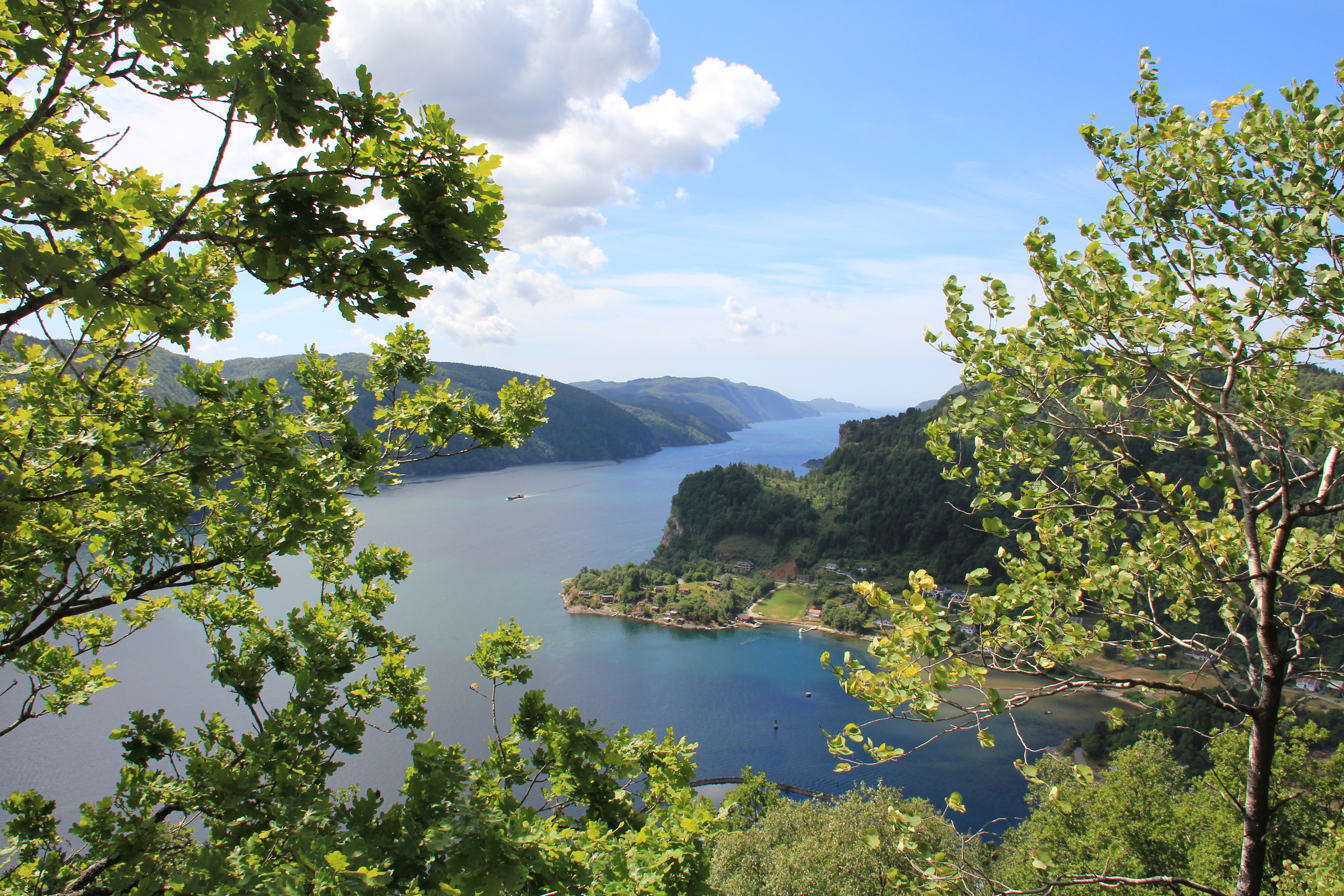
- View of the fjord
- Interactive map of the fjord
- Location: Agder county, Norway
- Coordinates: 58.2580°N 06.8191°E
- Type: Fjord
- Primary inflows: Kvina river
- Primary outflows: Listafjorden
- Basin countries: Norway
- Max. length: 15 kilometres (9.3 mi)
- Max. width: 1.5 kilometres (0.93 mi)
- Islands: Andabeløya
- Settlements: Feda

Fedafjorden is a fjord in Agder county, Norway. The 15-kilometre (9.3 mi) is located in the municipalities of Kvinesdal, Flekkefjord, and Farsund. The long, narrow fjord runs south from the mouth of the river Kvina to the Listafjorden.

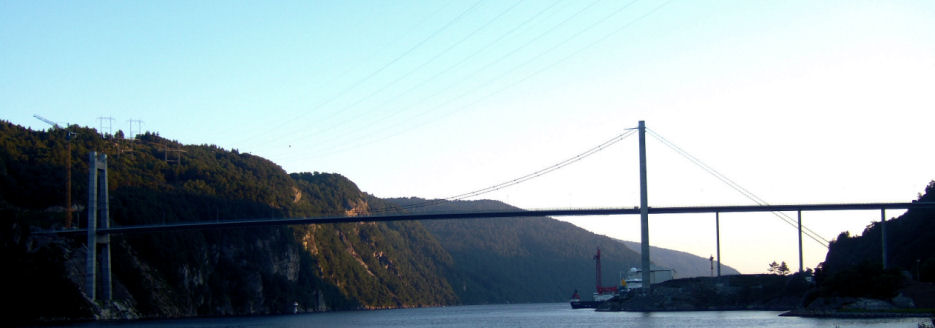
Fedafjorden Bridge

The fjord is 15 kilometres (9.3 mi) long and only about 1.5 kilometres (0.93 mi) wide. The village of Feda is located at the northwestern side of the fjord, just west of the Fedafjord Bridge on the European route E39 highway. Near the mouth of the fjord, at the south end, lies the island of Andabeløya. The majority of the fjord lies in Kvinesdal Municipality, but the mouth of the fjord is split between Flekkefjord Municipality and Farsund Municipality.

== History ==
The old Feda Municipality, which existed from 1900 until 1963, encompassed the 66-square-kilometre (25 sq mi) area surrounding both sides of the Fedafjorden.

== See also ==
- List of Norwegian fjords
