= Prostokvashino (film) =

Prostokvashino Fredonia: The Movie
- Directed by: Sarik Andreasyan
- Written by: Aleksandr Vyalykh; Ivan Novikov; Aleksey Korda
- Based on: Soyuzmultfilm's Three from Prostokvashino by Vladimir Popov; Uncle Fedya, His Dog, and His Cat by Eduard Uspensky
- Produced by: Semyon Shcherbovich-Vecher; Irina Venediktova; Vladimir Chibisov; Sarik Andreasyan; Gevond Andreasyan; Tina Kandelaki; Arkady Vodakhov; Boris Khanchalyan; Marina Razumova; Sergey Kosinsky; Yuliana Slashcheva; Yulia Osetinskaya; Ilya Shuvalov; Ekaterina Shuvalova
- Starring: Roman Pankov; Liza Moryak; Pavel Priluchny; Ivan Okhlobystin; Anton Tabakov; Pavel Derevyanko; Darya Blokhina
- Cinematography: Kirill Zotkin
- Music by: Artashes Andreasyan; Georgy Zheryakov
- Production companies: Soyuzmultfilm; K.B.A; TNT; Gazprom-Media Holding
- Distributed by: Cinema Atmosphere
- Release date: January 1, 2026 (Russia)
- Running time: 105 minutes
- Country: Russia
- Language: Russian
- Budget: ₽ 500 million
- Box office: ₽2.4 billion; $31,114,453

Prostokvashino, also in American territories titled as Fredonia: The Movie (Russian: Простоквашино) is a 2026 Russian live-action/animated family comedy film produced and directed by Sarik Andreasyan, it is a live-action adaptation of Soyuzmultfilm's 1978 Soviet animated short film Three from Prostokvashino, and its 1980 sequel Summer in Prostokvashino, and its 1984 sequel Winter in Prostokvashino, itself based on the 1974 Soviet children's novel Uncle Fedya, His Dog, and His Cat by Eduard Uspensky. It stars Roman Pankov, Liza Moryak, Pavel Priluchny and Ivan Okhlobystin, with the voices of Anton Tabakov, Pavel Derevyanko and Darya Blokhina.

It was released on January 1, 2026, by "Cinema Atmosphere" Film Distribution.

== Plot ==
It's the 1970s, the Soviet Union. A boy nicknamed Fyodor "Fedya" meets a talking cat in the entryway of his apartment building and invites him to live with him. Fyodor's parents (especially his mother, Rimma) are categorically against this, leading the boy to decide to run away from home just before a family trip to Sochi. The next morning, he and the cat travel to the village of Prostokvashino, where the professor who taught the cat human speech lived.

Upon arrival, Uncle Fyodor and the cat, now named Matroskin, meet a talking dog named Sharik and move into a vacant house. Uncle Fyodor's parents only learn of their child's disappearance upon arriving in Sochi. On the advice of local police officers, they place an ad in the newspaper. When the newspaper reaches Prostokvashino, Uncle Fyodor decides to write a letter to the parents, but it arrives in Sochi only after they return to Moscow. From the police officers who read the letter, the mother and father learn the name of the village where their son is, but the search is complicated by the fact that there are 22 villages named Prostokvashino in the Soviet Union. They decide to send telegrams to each of these villages in the hopes of finding out exactly where their child is.

Igor Ivanovich Pechkin, a postman living in Prostokvashino, received a telegram and learned that the finder of the boy would receive a reward–a bicycle. He decided to measure Uncle Fyodor’s height at any cost, which, according to the description, is 120 cm. The following night, Murka the Cow, whom a neighbor has asked Uncle Fyodor, Matroskin the Cat, and Sharik the Dog to look after, gives birth to a calf. Pechkin the Postman sneaks into the house when everyone is asleep to measure the boy's height. The calf, named Gavryusha, chases the postman away, but runs off into the street and gets lost. While searching for Gavryusha, Uncle Fyodor understands how his parents felt when he ran away. The calf is found, but Uncle Fyodor falls ill.

The parents finally receive a reply from the village they were looking for, located in the Mozhaysky District, Moscow Oblast, and they travel there. Mother apologizes to Uncle Fyodor for not allowing Matroskin the Cat to stay, and they make peace. Uncle Fyodor leaves for the city with his parents, Pechkin the Postman gets his bicycle, and Matroskin the Cat and Sharik the Dog remain in Prostokvashino.

== Cast ==
=== Live-action cast ===
- Roman Pankov as Uncle Fyodor, other names are Fedya
- Liza Moryak as Uncle Fyodor's mother
- Pavel Priluchny as Uncle Fyodor's father
- Ivan Okhlobystin as Pechkin the Postman
- Aleksei Maklakov as Tarelkin the Postman
- Vladimir Sychyov as Lozhkin the Postman
- Aleksandr Lykov as Vilkin the Postman
- Roza Khayrullina as Vilkin's wife
- Tatyana Orlova as Margarita, the hostess
- Svetlana Nemolyaeva as old lady Zina, Murka the Сow's owner
- Galina Stakhanova as a grandma
- Magomed Murtazaaliev as Khasik, a Soviet militia lieutenant in Sochi (English: Hasik)
- Karen Arutyunov as Timur, a Soviet militia captain in Sochi
- Irina Temicheva as a telegraph girl
- Timur Batrutdinov as postman No. 1 in Moscow
- Mikhail Tarabukin as postman No. 2
- Dmitry Kolchin as medic No. 1
- Ivan Kokorin as medic No. 2
- Sarik Andreasyan as Arsenchik

=== Voice cast ===
- Anton Tabakov as Matroskin the Cat
- Pavel Derevyanko as Sharik the Dog
- Darya Blokhina as Hvatayka the Little Jackdaw (English: Jack Grabbit)
- Kseniya Chasovskikh as Murka the Cow

== Production ==
Director Sarik Andreasyan acquired the rights to adapt the book Uncle Fedya, His Dog, and His Cat for the screen in February 2023. Producers announced the start of filming in June 2024. Sarik Andreasyan and Gevond Andreasyan's company K.B.A. (Russian: Кинокомпания братьев Андреасян, romanized: Kinokompaniya brat'yev Andreasyan, lit. 'Andreasyan Brothers Film Company'), decided to take on the film adaptation.

The film was produced by the Andreasyan Brothers Film Company with the participation of the TNT television channel and the Soyuzmultfilm animation studio. During the project's development phase, producers requested approximately 500 million rubles from the Cinema Fund, 300 million of which was non-repayable funding.

The film was the first project in a collaboration between the TNT television channel and the Soyuzmultfilm studio, officially announced as part of the business program of the 2024 St. Petersburg International Economic Forum.

The script is based on a fairy tale by Eduard Uspensky, well known to children in the post-Soviet space. The book was first published in 1974, and the first animated films appeared some time later. The film became the first part of a trilogy about a city boy nicknamed Uncle Fyodor and his life in the village of Prostokvashino with his new friends. The story of Uncle Fyodor's coming-of-age remains relevant, but the creators of the new film promise to tell it in a contemporary cinematic language.

=== Filming ===
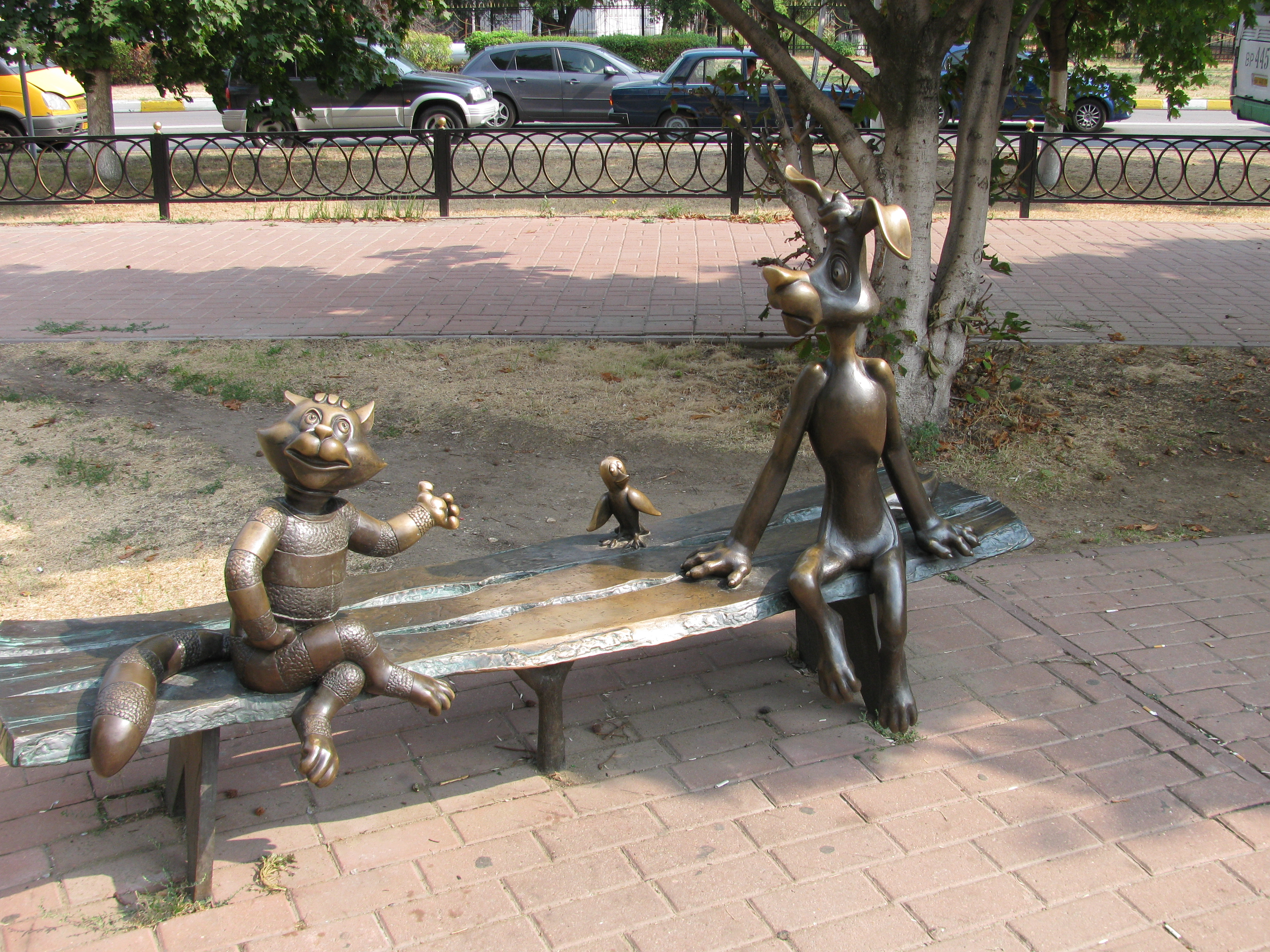
Monument to Matroskin the Cat, Hvatayka the Jackdaw, and Sharik the Dog in Ramenskoye.

Principal photography began in June 2024. A real village was built for filming in the Moscow region, complete with a post office, Uncle Fyodor's house, Professor Semin's home, and other buildings. Several scenes were shot in August 2025 at the Vitebsk Station and Moskino Cinema Park. The set featured scenes of Uncle Fyodor and the dog Sharik rushing to catch the train, as well as the boy's parents' departure for vacation and their arrival at the train station in Sochi.

=== Visual effects ===
The main fairy-tale characters - a cat, a dog, and a jackdaw - are animated, inspired by the "canonical" images from the 1978 Soviet cartoon Three from Prostokvashino.

== Release ==
Prostokvashino premiered on December 14, 2025 at the “KARO 11 October” cinema center in Moscow on New Arbat Avenue. The film will theatrically released in Russia on January 1, 2026, by "Cinema Atmosphere" Film Distribution.

== Sequel ==
At the end of the first film, before the end credits, a trailer for the sequel, titled Winter in Prostokvashino (2026 film), was shown in theaters. Tina Kandelaki stated that the second part will be released in December 17, 2026.
