= Vladimir Popov (animator) =

- Born: Vladimir Ivanovich Popov; June 5, 1930; Moscow, Soviet Union
- Died: April 1, 1987 (aged 56); Moscow, Soviet Union
- Occupation: Animator

Vladimir Ivanovich Popov (Russian: Владимир Иванович Попов; 5 June 1930 – 1 April 1987) was a Soviet and Russian animator and art director. A member of ASIFA, he was named Honored Art Worker of the RSFSR in 1986.

== Biography ==
Vladimir Popov grew up in a communal apartment near Soyuzmultfilm. He was fond of painting since childhood and visited an art school. He also produced hand-made cartoons by drawing humorous scenes from the life of his neighbours on a transparent filmstrip and demonstrating them to a great success.

In 1951, Popov was employed by Soyuzmultfilm; for the next ten years he had been working as an animator with Ivan Ivanov-Vano, Alexandra Snezhko-Blotskaya, Leonid Amalrik and other leading directors. Since 1960, he had been directing films together with Vladimir Pekar, also acting as an art director. Their most popular work of that time was Umka (1969), a traditionally animated short about a little polar bear loved by generations of children, along with the lullaby song performed by Aida Vedishcheva.

Since 1975, Popov had been working alone. Among his popular films were adaptations of Nikolay Nosov's Bobik Visiting Barbos (1977) and Yuri Koval's The Adventures of Vasya Kurolesov (1981). Yet his biggest success was the Three from Prostokvashino trilogy produced in 1978–1984 and based on the comedy fairy tales by Eduard Uspensky. Despite the cold reception from the officials, the mini-series became incredibly popular and turned into the source of many catchphrases. It was named the third best animated film/series of all time in the all-Russian poll conducted by the Public Opinion Foundation in February 2014.

Vladimir Popov died on 1 April 1987 aged 56. His death was sudden and unexpected. He was buried in the family tomb at the Vagankovo Cemetery in Moscow. In 1989, he was posthumously awarded the Vasilyev Brothers State Prize of the RSFSR.

== Filmography ==
=== Director ===
- 1960: Animated Crocodile No. 1 (Russian: Мультипликационный Крокодил № 1)
- 1961: The First Time on the Arena (Russian: Впервые на арене)
- 1961: Animated Crocodile No. 5 (Russian: Мультипликационный Крокодил № 5)
- 1962—1986: Fitil (Russian: Фитиль)
- 1966: Letters from the Radio Operator's Box (Russian: Буквы из ящика радиста)
- 1968: It Happened in Winter (Russian: Случилось это зимой)
- 1969: Umka (Russian: Умка)
- 1970: Umka is Looking for a Friend (Russian: Умка ищет друга)
- 1971: The Adventures of the Red Ties (Russian: Приключения красных галстуков)
- 1972: Are You My Enemy or My Friend? (Russian: Ты враг или друг?)
- 1972: Robbery in Broad Daylight (Russian: Грабёж среди белого дня)
- 1973: The Treasures of Sunken Ships (Russian: Сокровища затонувших кораблей)
- 1973: What is Scarier? (Russian: Что страшнее?)
- 1974: One Fairy Tale After Another (Russian: Сказка за сказкой)
- 1974: Stories about Shevchenko (Russian: Рассказы о Шевченко)
- 1975: Return Rex (Russian: Верните Рекса)
- 1975: The Rainbow (Russian: Радуга)
- 1976: How the Dwarf Left the House (Russian: О том, как гном покинул дом)
- 1977: Bobik Visits Barbos (Russian: Бобик в гостях у Барбоса)
- 1978: Three from Prostokvashino (Russian: Трое из Простоквашино)
- 1980: School Holidays in Prostokvashino (Russian: Каникулы в Простоквашино)
- 1981: The Adventures of Vasya Kurolesov (Russian: Приключения Васи Куролесова)
- 1983: From Two to Five (Russian: От двух до пяти)
- 1984: The Winter in Prostokvashino (Russian: Зима в Простоквашино)
- 1985: Sherlock Holmes and I (Russian: Мы с Шерлоком Холмсом)
- 1986: Academician Ivanov (Russian: Академик Иванов)
