= Three from Prostokvashino =

- Sharik, Matroskin and Uncle Fyodor
- Directed by: Vladimir Popov
- Written by: Eduard Uspensky
- Produced by: Soyuzmultfilm
- Starring: Maria Vinogradova; Oleg Tabakov; Lev Durov; Boris Novikov; Valentina Talyzina
- Cinematography: Kabul Rasulov
- Edited by: Natalya Stepantseva
- Music by: Yevgeny Krylatov
- Release date: June 6, 1978
- Running time: 18 minutes 48 seconds
- Country: Soviet Union
- Language: Russian

Three from Prostokvashino (Russian: Трое из Простоквашино, romanized: Troye iz Prostokvashino) is a 1978 Soviet animated film based on the 1974 children's book Uncle Fedya, His Dog, and His Cat by Eduard Uspensky. The main character is a six-year-old boy who is called "Uncle Fyodor" (voiced by Maria Vinogradova) because he is very serious. After his parents refuse to let him keep the talking cat Matroskin (voiced by Oleg Tabakov), Uncle Fyodor leaves home. With the dog Sharik (voiced by Lev Durov), the three set up a home in the country village Prostokvashino (Russian: Простоквашино, IPA: [prəstɐˈkvaʂɨnə], Простокваша = "soured milk"). There they have many adventures, some involving the local mailman, Pechkin (voiced by Boris Novikov).

The series has generated many quotable phrases in post-Soviet countries. It has made an impact comparable to that of Well, Just You Wait! (1969-2017) in Russian culture.

== Plot ==
Uncle Fyodor is a very independent city boy, "a boy on his own". After his mother forbids him from keeping his talking cat Matroskin, Uncle Fyodor runs away from home to live on his own. Uncle Fyodor and the cat arrive at the village Prostokvashino, where they meet the local mongrel Sharik. The three settle in an abandoned house.

Uncle Fyodor's parents become very agitated at the loss of their son, and even put out a missing persons notice in the paper. Mailman Pechkin sees it, and claims the announced reward for the boy's safe return — a new bicycle.

By the end of the film, the family is reunited, and the mailman receives his reward for notifying the parents. The parents tell the animals that they are welcome to come back to the city with them, but they decide to stay in Prostokvashino to make a summer house (dacha) for Fyodor.

== Cast ==
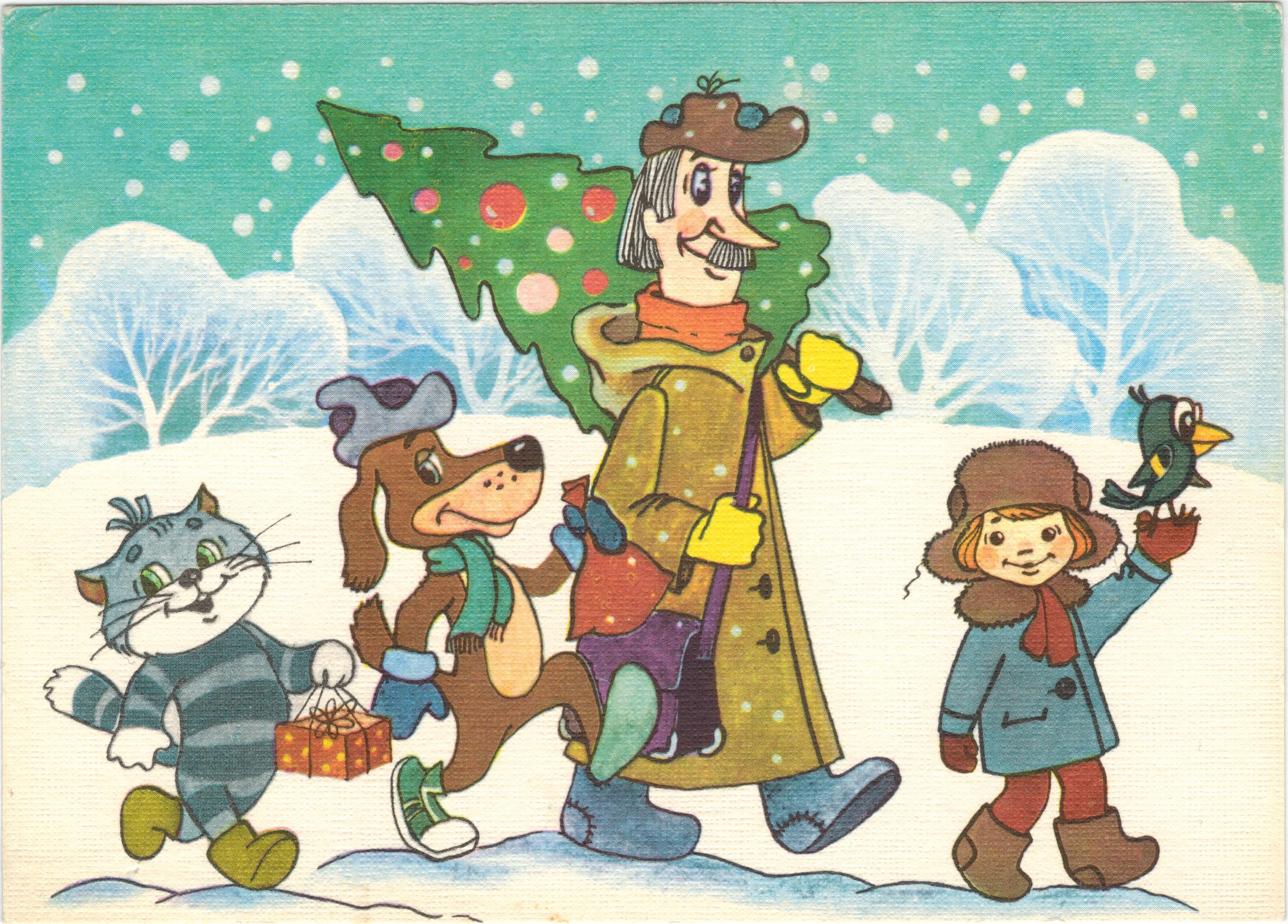
The cast of Three from Prostokvashino on the postal card of the USSR, 1988

- Maria Vinogradova as Uncle Fyodor
- Oleg Tabakov as cat Matroskin
- Lev Durov as dog Sharik
- Boris Novikov as mailman Pechkin
- Valentina Talyzina as Uncle Fyodor's mother
- Gyerman Kachin as Uncle Fyodor's father
- Zinaida Naryshkina as little jackdaw

== Sequels ==
The film has three sequels, Vacation in Prostokvashino (Каникулы в Простоквашино) (1980), Winter in Prostokvashino (Зима в Простоквашино) (1984), and Spring in Prostokvashino (Весна в Простоквашино) (2010).

Since 2018, the animated series Prostokvashino has been broadcast.

Prostokvashino (film), 2026 Russian comedy film
