= Feda Municipality =

Former municipality in Vest-Agder, Norway

Feda Municipality Feda herad
- Former municipality
- Fede (historic name)
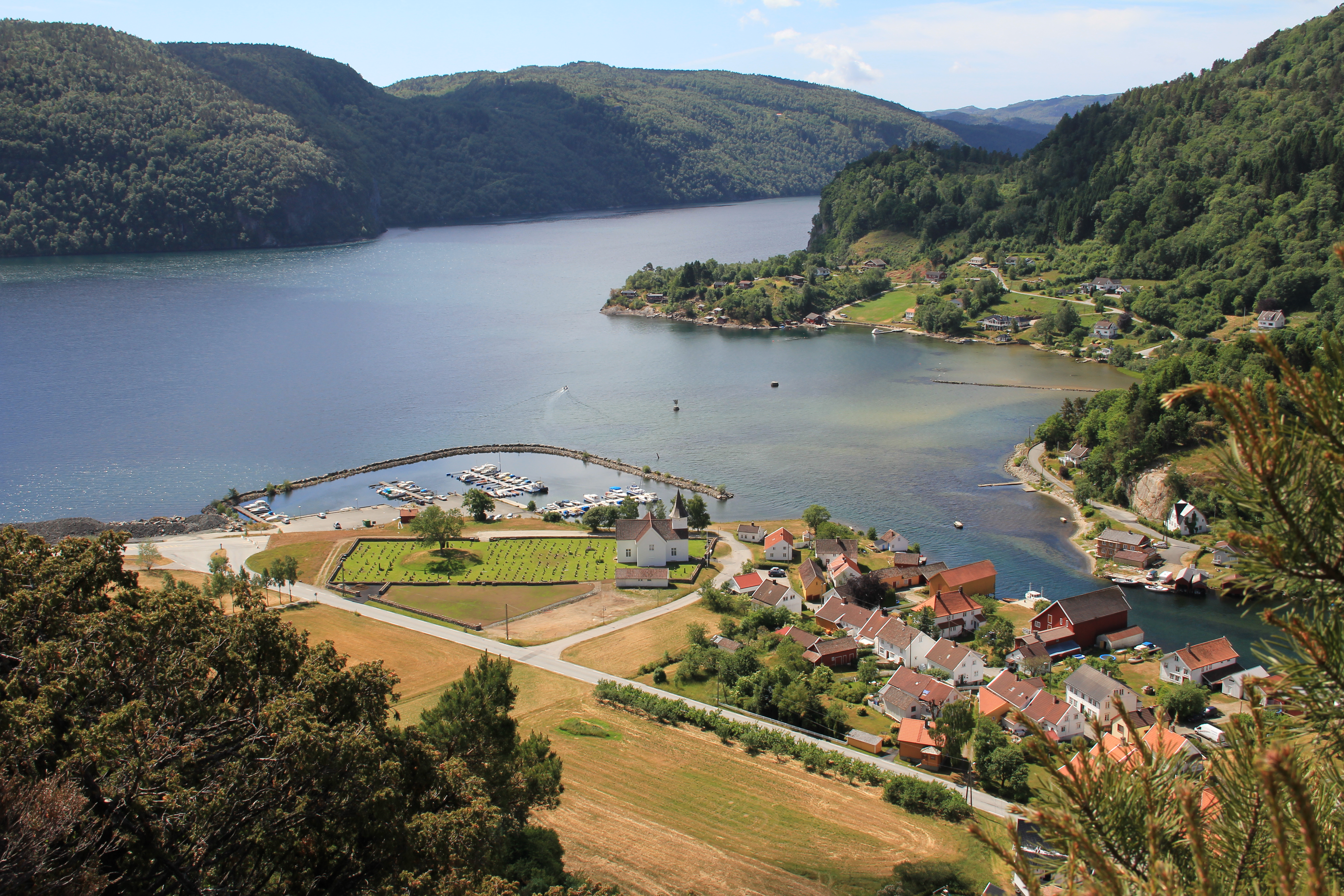
- View of the mouth of the Fedaelva river and the Fedafjorden

- Vest-Agder within Norway

- Feda within Vest-Agder
- Coordinates: 58°16′00″N 06°49′11″E
- Country: Norway
- County: Vest-Agder
- District: Lister
- Established: 1 Jan 1900
  - Preceded by: Kvinesdal Municipality
- Disestablished: 1 Jan 1963
  - Succeeded by: Kvinesdal Municipality
- Administrative centre: Feda, Norway

Government
  - Mayor (1960–1962): Bjarne Sande (LL)

Area (upon dissolution)
  - Total: 66.5 km^{2} (25.7 sq mi)
  - Rank: #574 in Norway
- Highest elevation: 535 m (1,755 ft)

Population (1962)
  - Total: 601
  - Rank: #681 in Norway
  - Density: 9/km^{2} (23/sq mi)
  - Change (10 years): ▼ −13%

Official language
  - Norwegian form: Nynorsk
- Time zone: UTC+01:00 (CET)
  - Summer (DST): UTC+02:00 (CEST)
- ISO 3166 code: NO-1038

Feda is a former municipality in the old Vest-Agder county, Norway. The 66.5-square-kilometre (25.7 sq mi) municipality existed from 1900 until its dissolution in 1963. The area is now part of Kvinesdal Municipality in the traditional district of Lister in Agder county. The administrative centre was the village of Feda where the historic Feda Church is located.

Prior to its dissolution in 1963, the 66.5-square-kilometre (25.7 sq mi) municipality was the 574th largest by area out of the 705 municipalities in Norway. Feda Municipality was the 681st most populous municipality in Norway with a population of about 601. The municipality's population density was 9 inhabitants per square kilometre (23/sq mi) and its population had decreased by 13% over the previous 10-year period.

== General information ==
The municipality of Feda was created on 1 January 1900 when the old Kvinesdal Municipality was split into two separate municipalities: the southern district (population: 1,090) became the new Feda Municipality and the northern district (population: 2,937) continued as a smaller Kvinesdal Municipality (this municipality was renamed Liknes Municipality from 1900 until 1917 when it reverted back to Kvinesdal Municipality).

During the 1960s, there were many municipal mergers across Norway due to the work of the Schei Committee. On 1 January 1963, Feda Municipality was dissolved and the following areas were merged to form a much larger Kvinesdal Municipality:

- all of Feda Municipality (population: 576)
- all of Fjotland Municipality (population: 1,244)
- all of Kvinesdal Municipality (population: 3,218)

=== Name ===
The municipality (originally the parish) is named after the old Fede farm (Old Norse: Feta). The farm was named after the local river, now known as the Fedaelva (which flows into the Fedafjorden near the farm). The meaning of the name comes from the Old Norse word fit which means "lush meadow on the banks of a river".

Historically, the name of the municipality was spelled Fede. On 3 November 1917, a royal resolution changed the spelling of the name of the municipality to Feda.

=== Churches ===
The Church of Norway had one parish (sokn) within Feda Municipality. At the time of the municipal dissolution, it was part of the Kvinesdal prestegjeld and the Flekkefjord prosti (deanery) in the Diocese of Agder.

Churches in Feda Municipality
Parish (sokn)	Church name	Location of the church	Year built
Feda	Feda Church	Feda	1802

== Geography ==
Feda Municipality encompassed the far southern tip of the present-day Kvinesdal Municipality. It surrounded both sides of the 13-kilometre (8.1 mi) long Fedafjorden and the surrounding valleys. The highest point in the municipality was the 535-metre (1,755 ft) tall mountain Veden, located on the border with Kvinesdal Municipality. Gyland Municipality was located to the north, Kvinesdal Municipality was located to the east, Herad Municipality was located to the south, and Nes Municipality was located to the west.

== Government ==
While it existed, Feda Municipality was responsible for primary education (through 10th grade), outpatient health services, senior citizen services, welfare and other social services, zoning, economic development, and municipal roads and utilities. The municipality was governed by a municipal council of directly elected representatives. The mayor was indirectly elected by a vote of the municipal council. The municipality was under the jurisdiction of the Flekkefjord District Court and the Agder Court of Appeal.

=== Municipal council ===
The municipal council (Heradsstyre) of Feda Municipality was made up of representatives that were elected to four year terms. The tables below show the historical composition of the council by political party.

Feda heradsstyre 1959–1963
Party name (in Nynorsk)	Number of representatives
Local List(s) (Lokale lister)	13
Total number of members:	13
Note: On 1 January 1963, Feda Municipality became part of Kvinesdal Municipality.

Feda heradsstyre 1955–1959
Party name (in Nynorsk)	Number of representatives
Labour Party (Arbeidarpartiet)	2
Local List(s) (Lokale lister)	11
Total number of members:	13

Feda heradsstyre 1951–1955
Party name (in Nynorsk)	Number of representatives
Labour Party (Arbeidarpartiet)	2
Local List(s) (Lokale lister)	10
Total number of members:	12

Feda heradsstyre 1947–1951
Party name (in Nynorsk)	Number of representatives
Labour Party (Arbeidarpartiet)	1
Local List(s) (Lokale lister)	11
Total number of members:	12

Feda heradsstyre 1945–1947
Party name (in Nynorsk)	Number of representatives
Local List(s) (Lokale lister)	12
Total number of members:	12

Feda heradsstyre 1937–1941*
Party name (in Nynorsk)	Number of representatives
Labour Party (Arbeidarpartiet)	2
Joint List(s) of Non-Socialist Parties (Borgarlege Felleslister)	10
Total number of members:	12
Note: Due to the German occupation of Norway during World War II, no elections were held for new municipal councils until after the war ended in 1945.

=== Mayors ===
The mayor (Nynorsk: ordførar) of Feda Municipality was the political leader of the municipality and the chairperson of the municipal council. The following people have held this position:

- 1900–1904: Simon A. Sande (H)
- 1905–1909: Mathias O. Risnes (V)
- 1910–1912: Anders Gabriel Tønnessen (H)
- 1913–1913: Mathias O. Risnes (V)
- 1913–1922: Martin Briseid (V)
- 1923–1928: Karl Rørvik (LL)
- 1929–1930: Thom Rørvik (LL)
- 1930–1944: Karl Rørvik (LL)
- 1944–1945: Otto Mejlænder (NS)
- 1945–1945: Karl Rørvik (LL)
- 1946–1955: Bjarne Sande (LL)
- 1956–1960: Arenfeldt Hølmebakk (LL)
- 1960–1962: Bjarne Sande (LL)

== See also ==
- List of former municipalities of Norway
