= Prostokvashino (TV series) =

Russian animated series

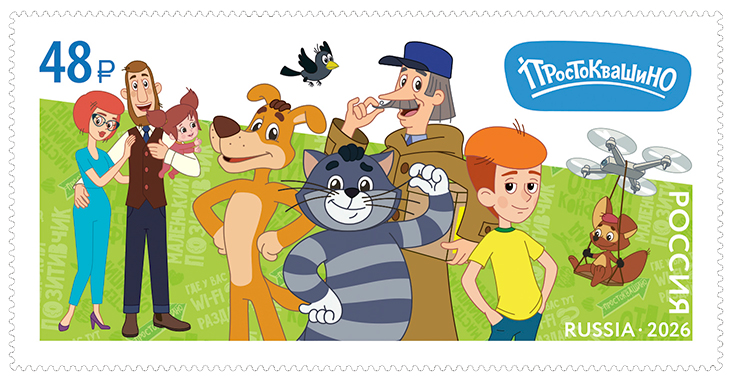
- Prostokvashino characters on a 2026 stamp of Russia
- Also known as: Простоквашино
- Created by: Mikhail Soloshenko
- Directed by: Mikhail Soloshenko; Vladimir Toropchin; Rinat Gazizov
- Country of origin: Russia
- Original language: Russian
- No. of seasons: 8
- No. of episodes: 183 + 8 special series

Production
- Running time: 2–13 minute-long episodes approx.
- Production company: Soyuzmultfilm

Original release
- Network: Carousel
- Release: 3 April 2018 – present

Prostokvashino (Russian: Простоквашино) is a Russian animated television series produced by Soyuzmultfilm. It is a continuation of the animated films "Three from Prostokvashino", "Vacations in Prostokvashino", "Winter in Prostokvashino" and "Spring in Prostokvashino".

An animated caricature of Vladimir Putin appeared on a special episode on 26 December 2025, voiced by Dmitry Grachev, who impersonated the president on TNT's Comedy Club.

== Plot ==
Uncle Fyodor has a younger sister, Vera Pavlovna. And Vera Pavlovna has a bestfriend, the rodent Tama-Tama. Later, they had a nanny, Margarita Egorovna. Meanwhile, Matroskin and Sharik have started a farm and are mastering new technologies.

== Cast ==
- Alexey Onezhen / Miguel Kerimov / Angel Zhukov as Uncle Fyodor
- Anton Tabakov as cat Matroskin
- Garik Sukachov / Pavel Derevyanko / Nikita Volkov as dog Sharik
- Ivan Okhlobystin as mailman Pechkin
- Yuliya Menshova / Anna Stakhova / Julia Silantieva as Uncle Fyodor's mother
- Andrey Tenetko as Uncle Fyodor's dad
- Tatyana Vasilyeva as nanny Margarita Egorovna
- Beata Sukhova / Leva Kuzin as Vera Pavlovna (Uncle Fyodor's younger sister)
- Liza Bugulova as Devochka (Note: "Girl" in Russian) Olya

== Award ==
- 2018 – "Multimir": The People's vote prize "The best hero of a Russian animated film" (cat Matroskin)
- 2019 – National Children's Award "Main Characters-2019": victory in the nomination "The main premieres of Russian animated series"
- 2021 – TEFI-KIDS: victory in the nomination "Best Animated Series"
- 2021 – Award of the Government of Russia in the field of culture: award for significant contribution to the development of Russian culture

== See also ==
- History of Russian animation
