= Midelfart =

Midelfart is a surname. Notable people with the surname include:

- Celina Midelfart (born 1973), Norwegian businesswoman
- Hans Christian Ulrik Midelfart (1772–1823), Norwegian Lutheran minister and politician
- Tove Kvammen Midelfart (born 1951), Norwegian lawyer and businesswoman

== See also ==
- Midelfart family
