= List of gas carriers =

This list of gas carrier ships includes LPG carriers and LNG carriers. Ships with multiple names may be listed under each name.

== A ==
- Al Barrah
- Al Dafna
- Al Jabirah
- Al Oraic
- Al Rayyan
- Al Thakhira
- Aleksey Kosygin
- Ayame
- Almarona
- Artemis Gas
- Alrar
- Althea Gas
- Anafi
- Annapurna
- Antwerpen
- Arctic Discoverer
- Armada LNG Mediterrana
- Asia Excellence
- Australgas
- Aurora Capricorn
- Azeri Gas
- Al Utouriya
- Al Thumama
- Al Sahla
- Aseem (SCI)

== B ==
- Berlian Ekuator
- Berge Ningbo
- Berge Nantong
- British Commerce
- British Councillor
- British Commerce
- British Courage
- British Diamond
- British Emerald
- British Innovator
- British Merchant
- British Ruby
- British Sapphire
- British Trader
- BW Gemini
- BW TYR
- BW ELM
- BW Brussels
- BW Batangas
- BW Pavilion Vanda
- BW Pavilion Leeara
- BW Pavilion Aranthera
- BW Pavilion Aranda
- BW Singapore
- BW Integrity
- BW ENN Crystal Sky
- BW Clear Sky
- BW Lilac
- BW Tulip
- BW Magnolia
- BW Lesmes
- BW Helios
- BW Tatiana
- BW Empress (Ex-Yuyo Berge)

== D ==
- Disha (SCI)
- Devonshire

== E ==
- Excellence
- Excelsior
- Excel
- Exemplar
- Expedient
- Experience
- Explorer
- Express

== F ==
- Flanders Loyalty
- Flanders Liberty
- Flanders Harmony
- Fuji LNG

== G ==
- Gaz Venezia
- Gas Al Ahmadiah
- Gas Umm Al Rowaisat
- Gas Al Mubarakiah
- Gas Al Negeh
- Gas Al Kuwait II
- Gaz Victory
- Gas miracle
- Gas magic
- Gas cat
- Gas lıne
- Gandria
- Gmi
- Golar arctic
- Golar celsius
- Golar freeze
- Golar grand
- Golar mazo
- Golar maria
- Golar seal
- Golar Spirit
- Golar viking
- Golar winter
- Gas courage
- Gas commerce
- Gas stella
- Grace Cosmos
- Grace Acacia
- Gas Diana

== H ==
- Hellas nautilus
- Hampshire

== I ==
- Iris Glory
- Independence (2014)

== J ==
- Jag vidhi
- Jag vishnu
- Jag Vijaya
- Jag Viraat
- Jag Vasanth
- Jag Vayu

== K ==
- Kailash Gas
- Kent

== L ==
- Luke
- Lyne
- Leto providence

== M ==
- Maharshi Labhatreya
- Maharshi Shubhatreya
- Maharshi Krishnatreya
- Maharshi Devatreya
- Maharshi Vamadeva
- Maharshi Bhardwaj
- Maharshi Devatreya
- Maersk Venture
- Maersk Jade
- Marshal Vasilevskiy
- Marycam Swan
- Mill Reef
- Mill House
- Maersk jewel
- Maersk Genesis
- Maersk Galaxy
- Maersk Gusto
- Maersk Global
- Maersk Glory
- Maersk Visual
- Maersk Value
- Methane Princess
- Malanje

== N ==
- Navigator Centauri
- Navigator Ceres
- Navigator Ceto
- Navigator Copernico
- Nippon Yusen Kaisha
- Norgas Innovation
- Norgas Unikum
- Norgas Bahrain Vision
- Norgas Invention
- Norgas Creation
- Norgas Conception

== O ==
- Orinda
- Ocean orchid
- Orion Sinead

== P ==
- Pertamina Gas 1 (Largest VLGC Ship in the world)
- Perseverance V
- Progress
- Prospect (BW Odin / Aurora Capricorn)
- Pacific Arcadia
- Pampero

== R ==
- Raahi (SCI)

== S ==
- Secreto
- Sylvie
- Sigas Sonja
- Sigas Silvia
- Sir Ivor
- Stena Blue Sky
- SKARPOV
- Sansovino
- Seri Bijaksana
- Soyo
- Staffordshire
- Serjeant
- Sinndar
- Suiso Frontier

== T ==
- Thetis Glory
- Tenacity IV

== V ==
- Venus Glory

== W ==
- Wiltshire

== Y ==
- Yuhsan
- Yuyo
- Yuyo Spirits

== Z ==
- Zekreet

== See also ==
- Gas carrier
- LNG carrier
- Nizwa LNG
