= Jake Saunders =

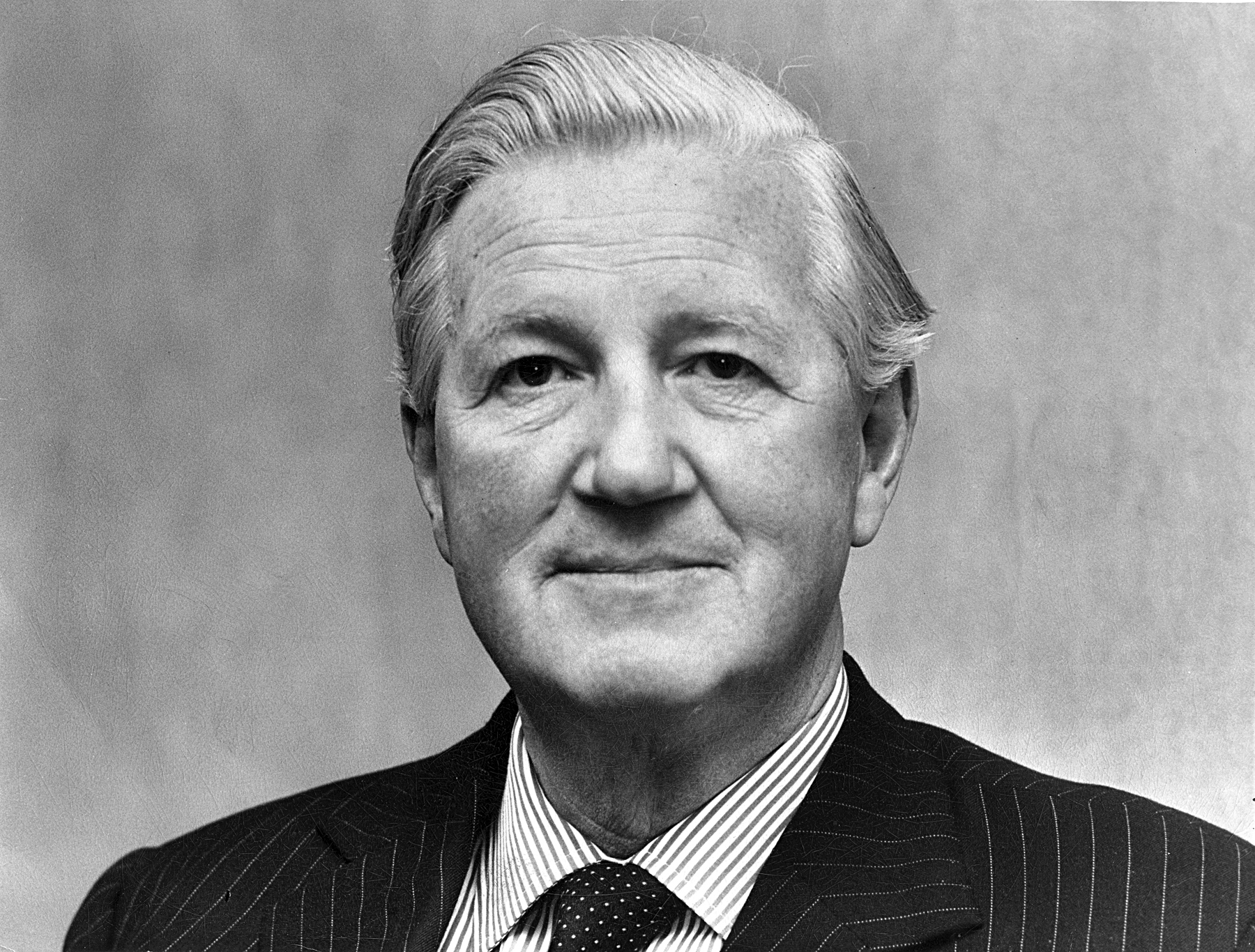
Sir John Saunders – 'Jake'

Sir John Anthony Holt Saunders, CBE, DSO, MC (29 July 1917 – 4 July 2002) was chairman of The Hongkong and Shanghai Banking Corporation (now HSBC Holdings plc), at a time of rapid and turbulent development of the Hong Kong economy. In his banking career, as chief manager (effectively chief executive) from 1962, and chairman from 1964 to 1972, Saunders was at the helm of Hong Kong's most important financial institution at a time when the Crown Colony was rapidly changing from a trading post to a regional centre of manufacturing and finance.

The fierce pace of economic growth for Hong Kong was fuelled by an influx of industrious migrants from China and an administration dedicated to laissez-faire tax and trade policies. From 1966, however, domestic business confidence and dealings with mainland China were severely disrupted by Mao Zedong's Cultural Revolution. In 1967 the devaluation of sterling – to which Hong Kong's currency was then fixed – was another blow.

Saunders led the bank through these events with a calming hand. In its centenary year, 1965, The Hongkong and Shanghai Banking Corporation was offered a majority stake in the Hang Seng Bank, a local retail bank which had suffered a sudden run on deposits after rumours that it was in trouble.

Saunders was out of the colony when the crisis arose, but returned to complete the negotiation. In the same period, he broadened The Hongkong and Shanghai Banking Corporation's own customer base to include a new generation of Chinese (often Shanghainese) entrepreneurs, and acquired for the bank an early equity stake in the World-Wide Shipping Group, the shipping empire of Sir Yue-Kong ("Y.K.") Pao, with whom Saunders formed a close friendship.

The bank also invested in the Swire family's Cathay Pacific airline. Its branch network expanded, and it was a frontrunner in computerisation.

== Early life ==
He was born at Uxbridge, the son of a banker, and educated at Bromsgrove School. He joined The Hongkong and Shanghai Banking Corporation in London in 1937 on the introduction of the Duke of Devonshire, to whom his maiden aunt Elsie was private secretary.

As training for his first tour of duty in the Far East, he was posted to the bank's Lyons branch in France, where the principal business was financing the silk trade with Indo-China. He became a lifelong Francophile, acquiring a particular enthusiasm for champagne and oysters.

== World War II ==
During the Second World War he fought in North Africa, Sicily and Italy, was wounded and mentioned in dispatches and won an MC and a DSO in Italy in the battles of Monte Spaduro and the Argenta Gap.

When war broke out in 1939, he resigned from The Hongkong and Shanghai Banking Corporation and took the train back to England to enlist in the British Army as a private soldier. He was selected for officer training at the Royal Military College, Sandhurst where he was awarded the Belt of Honour for the best cadet in his intake.

Saunders was commissioned as a second lieutenant into the East Surrey Regiment. He fought with the 1st Battalion of the regiment, part of the 11th Infantry Brigade of the 78th "Battleaxe" Infantry Division, of the British First Army, in Tunisia, North Africa, first as a platoon commander and later as intelligence officer. The division had a very active role in the campaign and after hostilities in North Africa ceased in May 1943, it became part of General Bernard Montgomery's British Eighth Army and took part in the Allied invasion of Sicily, notably in the heavy fighting at Centuripe at the start of August 1943.

In late September the division was shipped to Taranto in Southern Italy and joined the Italian campaign up the Adrian coast. Across the Eighth Army's line of advance lay the Biferno, Trigno and Sangro rivers which marked a series of German prepared defensive lines: the Volturno Line, the Barbara Line and the Winter Line (variously referred to as the Gustav Line or Bernhardt Line). The division fought a notable action at the Battle of Termoli on the Volturno Line and was one of Montgomery's lead divisions for the attacks on the two subsequent lines. Following these actions the division was rested at the army's leave centre in Campobasso. After a week the Surreys were placed in a quieter section of the front high in the Apennine Mountains guarding the Eighth Army's left wing during the Moro River Campaign in December. The land was very bleak and wild; although there was little combat during the period (mainly skirmishes between opposing patrols) life was very uncomfortable because of the freezing temperatures, deep snow and remoteness from town comforts.

In February 1944 (by which time Saunders was the Battalion Adjutant) 78 Division moved across the Apennine Mountains to the Cassino sector to become part of the New Zealand Corps under Lieutenant General Mark Clark's U.S. Fifth Army. The Fifth Army had already made two unsuccessful attempts to break the Winter Line at Cassino and it was planned for 78th Division to exploit the planned breakthrough by the 2nd New Zealand and 4th Indian Infantry Divisions during the third battle. The attempt failed and the East Surrey's role was restricted to patrolling its sector of front on the Rapido river. At the end of March the East Surreys were moved into the mountains behind Cassino to relieve the badly mauled Indians. The location was once again cold and bleak and overlooked by German positions, making movement in daylight impossible. The ground was hard and rocky so that only shallow trenches could be dug with loose stone surrounds providing scant protection. After a month the battalion was relieved by Polish units for a short rest period, followed by intense training for the fourth Battle of Monte Cassino. After the Allied breakthrough in Operation Diadem the division took part in the advance up the Liri valley continuing to fight northwards from Rome towards Arezzo. After heavy fighting at the Trasimene Line, another German defensive line, the division was taken out of the line in July 1944 for rest in Egypt.

Early in October 1944, the battalion, in which Saunders was now a major commanding a rifle company, returned with the 78th Division to Italy and traveled by transport on a circuitous route from Taranto that took them through Assisi, Perugia and Arezzo to San Apollinare in the Tuscan Apennine mountains north of Florence.

It was a grim, mountainous area with narrow, winding tracks, pitted with shell holes which turned to slippery mud in the heavy rain. The task of the 78th Division was, as part of Lieutenant-General Sidney C. Kirkman's British XIII Corps (which at this time formed the right wing of Mark Clark's U.S. Fifth Army), to join in the offensive to break through the mountains to the Lombardy plain. The battalion's role was to capture two objectives, Monte La Pieve and Monte Spaduro, which blocked the advance.

On the night of 15 October, the 1st Surrey's attack on Monte Pieve was only partly successful, but an attack in brigade strength two days later ended in anti-climax when the enemy was found to have gone.

Monte Spaduro, a massive, razor-backed ridge running from south to north for almost two miles (3 km), remained in German hands and on the night of 23 October the battalion took part in a brigade attack on the feature.

The approach march to the brigade assembly area took the 1st Surreys along three and a half miles of winding mountain tracks with steep, muddy gradients. After a heavy artillery barrage, "A" Company, commanded by Major Saunders and "D" Company led the assault on Monte Spaduro with "C" Company bringing up the rear.

By one o'clock in the morning, after heavy fighting, the battalion had achieved the objective, but persistent sniping and machine-gun fire from the cover of deep gullies pinned down "A" Company and prevented "C" Company from moving up to its correct position. The following afternoon, Saunders tried to flush out the Germans with two-inch mortars but this failed.

The use of heavier weapons was considered but dismissed; the enemy was too close. When two men in the 1st Surreys attempted to move their position, one was sniped in the head and killed, the other took a bullet in the arm.

Saunders grabbed a rifle and bayonet and, taking two men with him, worked his way round to the gully. Reaching a point above where the enemy appeared to be, he charged down the gully towards them, yelling as he did so. Four German soldiers with two Spandau light machine-guns surrendered. Saunders was awarded an immediate MC.

The Battalion then spent a miserable winter holding mountainous unsheltered positions in bitterly cold and wet conditions.

Map of the Argenta Gap showing the Allied lines of advance.

In the spring of 1945, the 78th Division had returned to the Eighth Army, now under Lieutenant-General Richard L. McCreery, on the Adriatic front to join British V Corps. One of the army's objectives was to break through the German defences on the rivers Senio and Santerno and then drive through the Argenta Gap, a strip of land between Lake Comacchio and flooded land south of the river Reno, to form a pincer with U.S. Fifth Army attacking through the central Apennines to surround and destroy the German armies south of the River Po.

On 14 April, the 1st Surreys and the 2nd Battalion, Lancashire Fusiliers, as part of 78 Division's 11th Infantry Brigade, moved up to a concentration area in readiness for an assault on the Argenta Gap. The Lancashire Fusiliers had suffered heavy casualties and Saunders was transferred from the 1st Surreys and appointed second-in-command.

The 11th Brigade crossed the river Reno and negotiated extensive minefields until it reached the outskirts of Argenta. On the approach to Fossa Marina, a canal running north-eastwards from Argenta across the entire width of the Gap, it ran into strong opposition.

It was essential to press on to the Fossa Marina before the enemy could establish a firm defence there, and it was decided that a full-scale assault would be necessary.

On the evening of 16 April 1 Surreys moved forward after dark and secured a base from which the Lancashire Fusiliers could cross the Fossa Marina and establish a limited bridgehead beyond it. At midnight, after a bitter struggle, a foothold had been secured across the canal when the commanding officer of the Lancashire Fusiliers was wounded and the attack became stabilised on the line of the canal.

At this critical moment, Major Saunders took command of the battalion and, under his leadership, all the objectives were reached and held against determined counter-attacks the following morning. He was awarded an immediate DSO.

Hostilities ceased in early May and Saunders finished the war with the Surreys and 78th Division in Austria. He was demobilised from the British Army in 1946, having been mentioned in dispatches in July 1945.

== Post-war banking career ==
After the war, Saunders rejoined the bank in Singapore and was posted to Hong Kong in the early 1950s. He became Chief Accountant in 1955 and held a series of appointments in Hong Kong and Singapore, before becoming Chief Manager (the bank's most senior executive position) in 1962, succeeding Sir Michael Turner. The board of directors of the bank up to this point was entirely non-executive but in 1962, exceptionally, he was elected to the board. Over the next seven years he worked to introduce a new executive board structure. He was succeeded as Chief Manager by former director of the Central Trust of China, H.J. Shen, in September 1964 when he became Chairman of the bank. In 1969 his plans to reorganise the board to include more executives came to fruition and became executive chairman of the newly reorganised board.

As head of the bank, Saunders was also an important civic figure: he was a member of the Executive Council, was much involved in the development of Hong Kong University (for some years serving as Treasurer of the institution), and was chairman of the stewards of the Royal Hong Kong Jockey Club from 1967 to 1972, where he introduced a new level of professionalism. He served as a Justice of the Peace in Hong Kong from 1955 and was also a longstanding trustee of the Gurkha Welfare Trust. His influence in Hong Kong and the region led to the Portuguese Government conferring on him in 1966 the Commandership of the Order of Prince Henry. He also received an honorary Degree of Doctor of Social Sciences from The University of Hong Kong in 1969.

He was appointed CBE in 1970 and was knighted in 1972 when he retired from the bank. He continued to hold a number of non-executive positions in other organisations for some years afterwards including the chairmanship of Amalgamated Metal Corporation and International Commercial Bank and non-executive directorships of P & O, Rediffusion and subsidiaries of Y.K Pao's World-Wide Shipping Group. He died on 4 July 2002.

== See also ==
- Allied invasion of Sicily
- Barbara Line
- Battle of Monte Cassino
- Battle of the Argenta Gap
- Bernhardt Line
- Gothic Line
- Italian Campaign
- Operation Torch
- Run for Tunis
- Spring 1945 offensive in Italy
- The Hongkong and Shanghai Banking Corporation
- Tunisian campaign
- Volturno Line

== Sources ==
- Collis, Maurice (1965). Wayfoong: The Hongkong and Shanghai Banking Corporation. London: Faber and Faber
- Squire, G.L.A. and Hill, P.G.E. (1992). The Surreys in Italy. Clandon, Surrey: The Queen's Royal Surrey Regiment Museum

== Citations ==
Business positions
Preceded by Michael Turner	Chief Manager of Hongkong and Shanghai Banking Corporation; 1962–1964	Succeeded by H.J. Shen
Preceded by W. C. G. Knowles	Chairman of Hongkong and Shanghai Banking Corporation; 1964–1972	Succeeded by Guy Sayer
Sporting positions
Preceded by Donovan Benson	Chairman of the Royal Hong Kong Jockey Club; 1967–1972	Succeeded by Sir Douglas Clague
