= Pao Yu-Kong and Pao Zhao-Long Scholarship for Chinese Students Studying Abroad =

Zhejiang University scholarship

Pao Yu-Kong and Pao Zhao-Long Scholarship for Chinese Students Studying Abroad (Traditional Chinese: 包玉剛包兆龍中國留學生獎學金; Simplified Chinese: 包玉刚包兆龙中国留学生奖学金; for short: 包氏獎學金/包氏奖学金), is a renowned Chinese university scholarship issued by Zhejiang University.

== Introduction ==
The scholarship was established by the Hong Kong–based worldwide shipping tycoon Sir Yue-Kong Pao who was also a Zhejiang native. Pao's family also have continuously contributed to the scholarship. The scholarship is named after Sir Yue-Kong Pao and his father Pao Zhao-Long (Chinese: 包兆龍/包兆龙) who was also a successful businessman and banker.

The scholarship was first set in January 1983, based on the first donation of US$1 million by Pao. October 1985, Pao donated another million USD to enlarge the scholarship.

The purpose of the scholarship is to support qualified Zhejiang University students to pursue their studies outside mainland China.
