= Flanders Loyalty =

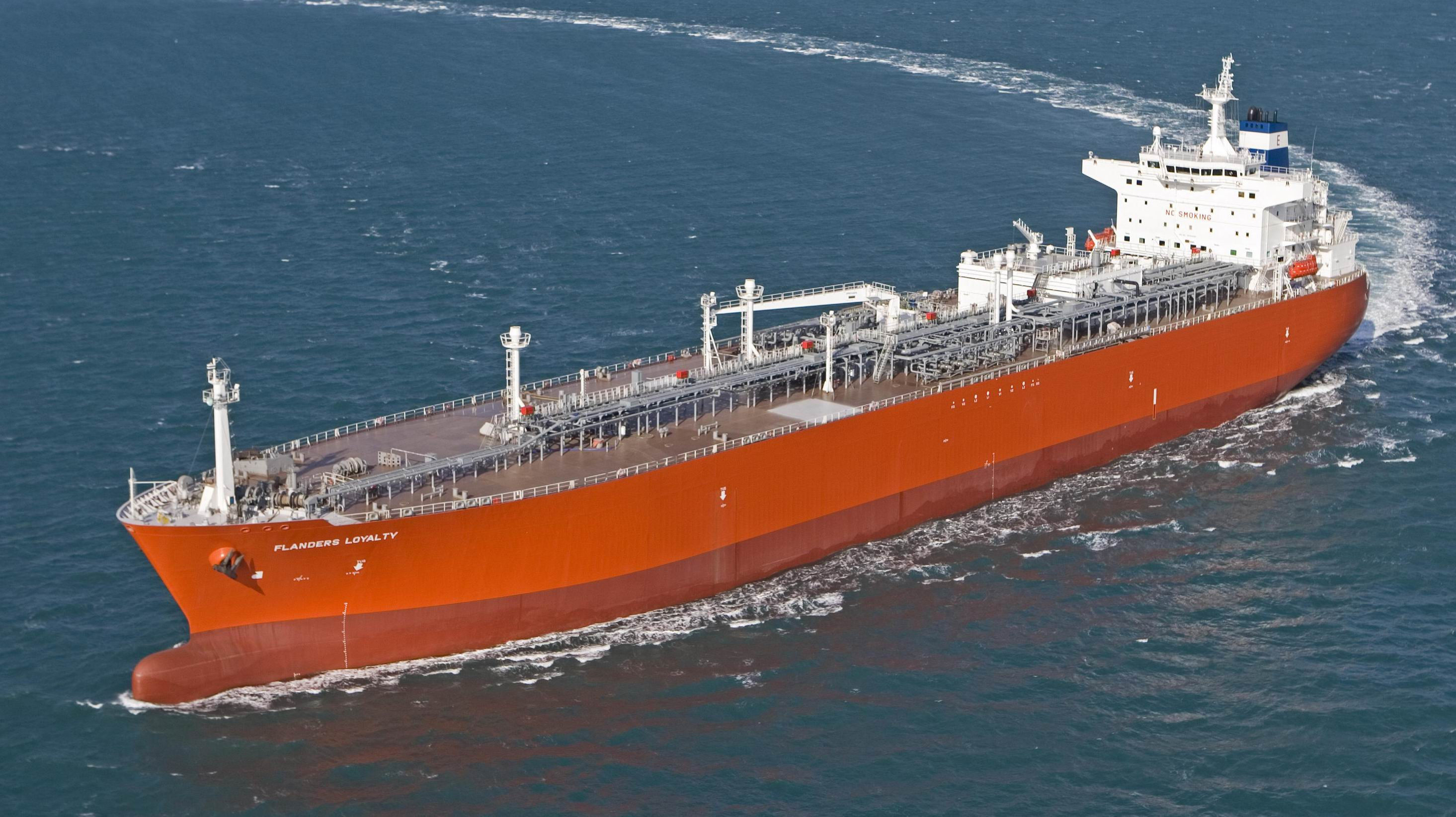
- Flanders Loyalty during her sea trials, December 2007

History

Belgium / Norway
- Name: Flanders Loyalty (2007-2011); BW Liberty (2011-present)
- Owner: Exmar Shipmanagement, Belgium (2007-2011); BW Gas, Norway (2011-present)
- Port of registry: Antwerp (2007-2011); Oslo (2011-present)
- Builder: Daewoo Shipbuilding and Marine Engineering Co. Ltd, South Korea
- Laid down: 1 June 2007
- Launched: 29 August 2007
- Christened: 6 November 2007
- Acquired: 16 January 2008
- Identification: IMO number: 9350288; Call sign: LAMM7; MMSI number: 259071000
- Status: in active service

General characteristics
- Type: LPG tanker
- Tonnage: 48,456 GT; 54,975 DWT; 17,304 NT
- Displacement: 73,561 t (72,399 long tons)
- Length: 226 m (741 ft 6 in) o/a; 215 m (705 ft 5 in) p/p
- Beam: 36.6 m (120 ft 1 in)
- Height: 54.76 m (179 ft 8 in)
- Draught: 11.82 m (38 ft 9 in)
- Propulsion: 13,560 kW (18,184 hp) engine

Flanders Loyalty is a liquefied petroleum gas (LPG) tanker, currently owned by BW Gas of Oslo, Norway and named BW Liberty.

== Ship history ==
The ship was built by Daewoo Shipbuilding and Marine Engineering Co, Ltd, Korea for Exmar Shipmanagement of Antwerp, Belgium. She was one of two identically constructed ships, and she and her sister ship, the Flanders Liberty, were both built to transport liquefied gasses like propane, butane, and ammonia. The keel of the Flanders Loyalty was laid on 1 June 2007, she was launched on 29 August 2007 and finally delivered to her owners on 16 January 2008. The naming ceremony took place on 6 November 2007. The Flanders Loyalty and the Flanders Liberty, were named together in the Daewoo shipyard.

Sea trials were held in December 2007 and on 16 January 2008 she took her maiden voyage from Okpo, South Korea to the Port of Tanjung Pelepas in Malaysia, where amounts of different gases were taken on board by ship-to-ship transfer, in order to execute all the gas trials necessary before the ship could finally be operated.

After completion of the tests she went to Singapore anchorage for some bunkering (taking on fuel and supplies). Her first port of loading was Ruwais in the United Arab Emirates. There she loaded butane, which she discharged one day later in Jebel Ali, also in the United Arab Emirates. In her first 10 months of service she called at 30 ports, all of them located between Japan and the Persian Gulf.

Flanders Loyalty was one of a number of ships involved in an exchange of vessels between Exmar and BW Gas in August–September 2011, and was renamed BW Liberty.
