= YK Pao School =

International school in Shanghai, China

- 上海包玉刚实验学校

Location
- Primary Division: 20, Lane 1251 West Wuding Road, Changning District, Shanghai, China 200042; High School Division: 1800, Lane 900 North Sanxin Road, Songjiang District, Shanghai, China 201620; Middle School Division: 2206 Hongqiao Road, Changning District, Shanghai, China 200336; Shanghai; China

Information
- Motto: 今日兴学，为明日中国。 今日兴教，为未来世界。 (A school for tomorrow's China. An education for tomorrow's world)
- Founders: Anna Sohmen Pao, Tan Fuyun and Philip Sohmen
- Headmaster: Mark Bishop (to December 2023) / Iain Kilpatrick (from January 2024)
- Gender: Coeducational
- Age: 5 to 18
- Houses: Spring, Summer, Autumn and Winter
- Colour: Green
- Website: http://www.ykpaoschool.cn

YK Pao School
- Traditional Chinese: 上海民辦包玉剛實驗學校
- Simplified Chinese: 上海民办包玉刚实验学校
Transcriptions
Standard Mandarin
- Hanyu Pinyin: Shànghǎi Mínbàn Bāo Yùgāng Shíyàn Xuéxiào

YK Pao School (Chinese: 上海民办包玉刚实验学校) is a private international school in Shanghai, China, named after shipping magnate Yue-Kong Pao. There are three campuses located in the city for primary, secondary, and high school education.

In 2021, the school was ranked first in Hurun Education's list of top international schools that accept Chinese students in China mainland.

== History ==
The school was founded in 2007 by Anna Pao Sohmen in memory of her father, businessman Yue-Kong Pao, who established the Hong Kong-based Worldwide Shipping Company in 1955.

In February 2025, the YK Pao Education Foundation announced that it would open a campus in Kowloon Tong, Hong Kong, after the Education Bureau allocated it a vacant site that could hold roughly 480 students. YK Pao School Hong Kong is set to open in 2026.

== Academics ==
The YK Pao School provides instruction in Chinese and English. Chinese is emphasized in the primary school, while the secondary schools incorporate both languages.

For primary and middle school students, YK Pao offers "Shanghai Plus" courses, which combine Chinese and international curricula. For high school students, YK Pao offers Shanghai Plus courses (year 9), IGCSE (year 10), and IB Diploma (years 11–12).
