= Golar LNG =

Gas shipping company

Golar LNG Limited
- Type: Publicly traded limited company
- Traded as: Nasdaq: GLNG; Russell 2000 Component
- Industry: Conglomerate
- Founded: 2001
- Headquarters: Hamilton, Bermuda
- Area served: Global
- Key people: Tor Olav Trøim (Chairman),
- Revenue: US $244.0 million (2010)
- Operating income: US $60.2 million (2010)
- Net income: US $384,000 (2010)
- Total assets: US$2.078 billion (end 2010)
- Total equity: US$599.3 million (end 2010)
- Number of employees: 33 (end 2010)
- Parent: World Shipholding (47.64%)
- Website: www.golarlng.com

Golar LNG owns and operates marine LNG infrastructure. The company has developed floating LNG liquefaction terminal (FLNG) and Floating Storage and Regasification Unit (FSRU) projects based on the conversion of existing LNG carriers. Front End Engineering and Design (FEED) studies have now been completed for a larger newbuild FLNG solution. Golar is also collaborating with another industry leader to investigate solutions for the floating production of blue and green ammonia as well as carbon reduction in LNG production.

== History ==
The company was founded in 1946 as Gotaas-Larsen Shipping Company. In 1970 the company entered the LNG segment.

In 1973, the Gotaas-Larsen oil tanker SS Golar Patricia exploded and sank off the Canary Islands. With gross register tonnage of 98,894 and deadweight tonnage of 216,326 long tons (242,285 short tons; 219,797 t), it was at the time the largest ship ever lost at sea.

The Singapore-based Osprey Maritime bought the company in 1997. In 2000 the John Fredriksen-controlled World Shipholding started a take-over of Osprey, completed in 2001 when the LNG segments of Osprey were transferred to Golar LNG. It was listed on the Oslo Stock Exchange in 2001 and NASDAQ in 2002, 30 August 2012 it was delisted from Oslo Stock Exchange.

In June 2015, Golar LNG announced a joint venture with Stolt-Nielsen to pursue production and distribution opportunities. The latter also made a strategic investment in the former, acquiring a 2.3 percent stake.

Golar LNG Partners LP still operated the world's first regasification vessel Golar Spirit converted from an LNG carrier as of 2009. The ship was later sold to New Fortress Energy.
