= Pao Yue-kong Library =

Hong Kong Polytechnic University library

Coordinates: 22.3034°N 114.1799°E

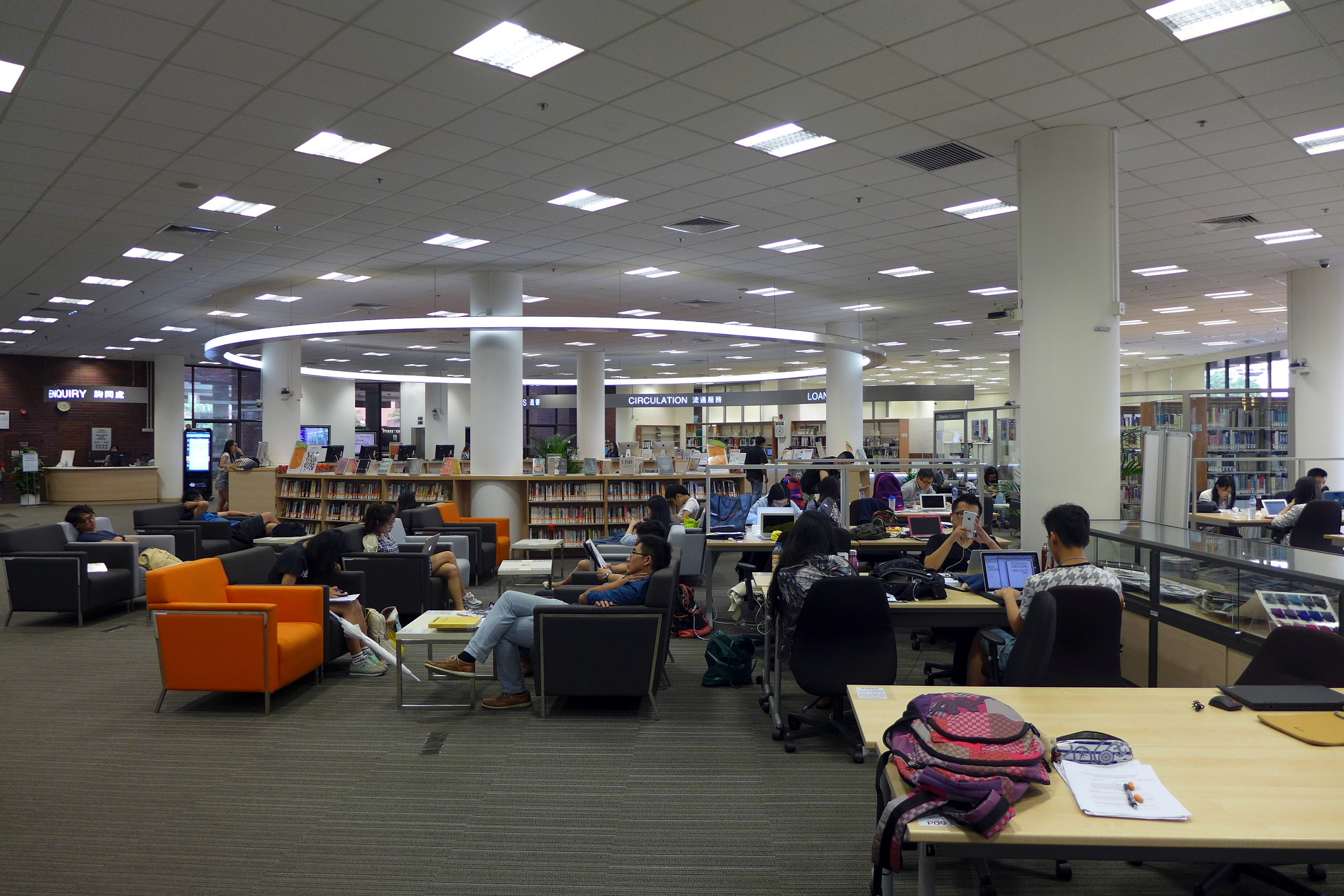
Podium level of the Pao Yue-Kong Library

Pao Yue-kong Library, full name Pao Yue-kong Library, the Hong Kong Polytechnic University, or PYK Library in short, is the main library of the Hong Kong Polytechnic University (PolyU). Established as the Hong Kong Polytechnic Library in 1972, it is now a modern academic library with 3,600 seats and a collection of 1,100,513 hardcopy books, 8,117,470 e-Books and, 255,412 e-Journals (titles). The Library Extension Project won the 2022 Best of Design Award by the Architect’s Newspaper.

== History ==
In 1957, the Grantham Library was founded when the Hong Kong Technical College moved to the Hung Hom Campus.

In 1964, the Imperial Chemical Industries (I.C.I.) Library was set up with a collection of approximately 10,000 volumes.

In 1972, the Hong Kong Polytechnic Library was established, taking over the I.C.I. Library from the Hong Kong Technical College.

From 1973 to 1976, the library operated two branches, one in Hung Hom of Kowloon and the other in Quarry Bay of Hong Kong Island. In 1976, the two branches merged and relocated to their current location. The opening ceremony was officiated by Princess Alexandra of the United Kingdom on February 7, 1977.

In 1985, the Library began the process of computerising, enabling the users to borrow books with their barcoded Polytechnic cards.

In 1994, the Hong Kong Polytechnic was upgraded to university status and the library renamed the "Hong Kong Polytechnic University Library".

In, 1995, the library was renamed the "Hong Kong Polytechnic University Pao Yue-Kong Library", named after shipping entrepreneur and philanthropist Yue-Kong Pao, in recognition of a generous donation from his family.

In 2011, READ@PolyU, a campus-wide reading programme was launched to cultivate a passion for reading among the University community. The LibCafe and the Current Awareness Centre were established on the Podium Floor.

In 2022, the Sixth Floor (top floor) was opened, featuring a contemporary design that combines indoor spaces with skylights and outdoor areas to create a stimulating and dynamic learning environment. The Library Extension and Revitalisation (LER) Project was honoured the Architect’s Newspaper’s 2022 Best of Design Award in the Library category.

In 2025, the Library collection surpassed 10 million items, with 99.9% of journals and 91% of books available online.

== Overview ==
The library currently spans 16,662 square meters on six floors (G/F to 5/F) and offers over 3,600 seats, over 400 computers, printers, a 24-hour reading room, and an extensive audio-visual collection. There is a collection of 1,100,513 physical volumes, 8,117,470 e-Books, 255,412 e-Journals (titles) and 453 Databases, with wireless access to the Internet.

The following is a table of the storey-level facilities.

Floor	South Wing	North Wing
G/F	Group Rooms, 24-Hour Reading Center, Quiet Study Area	Bookshelf (Classification Codes T-Z), Photocopying Section, Group Study Room
1/F	Bookshelf (Classification Codes Q-S)	Bookshelf (Classification Codes L-P), Photocopying Room
2/F	Entrance Hall, Library Service Counter, Designated Reference Books, Enquiry Desk, New Knowledge Center, Exhibition Hall, Library Café	(Outside the Library)
3/F	Enhanced Research Information Center, Reference Library, IT Lounge, Reference Consulting, Services and Technical Support	Audio-Visual Department
4/F	Bookshelf (Classification Codes H-K), Photocopying Room, Study Room	Bookshelf (Classification Codes A- G), Study Room
5/F	Recent Periodicals (Classification Codes A-Z), Bound Periodicals (Classification Codes QE-Z), Used Newspapers, Purchasing Department, Photocopy Room, Study Room	Bound Periodicals (Classification Codes A-QD), Study Room

For call numbers, please refer to:

== Gallery ==
Pao Yue Kong Library, Main Campus, PolyU

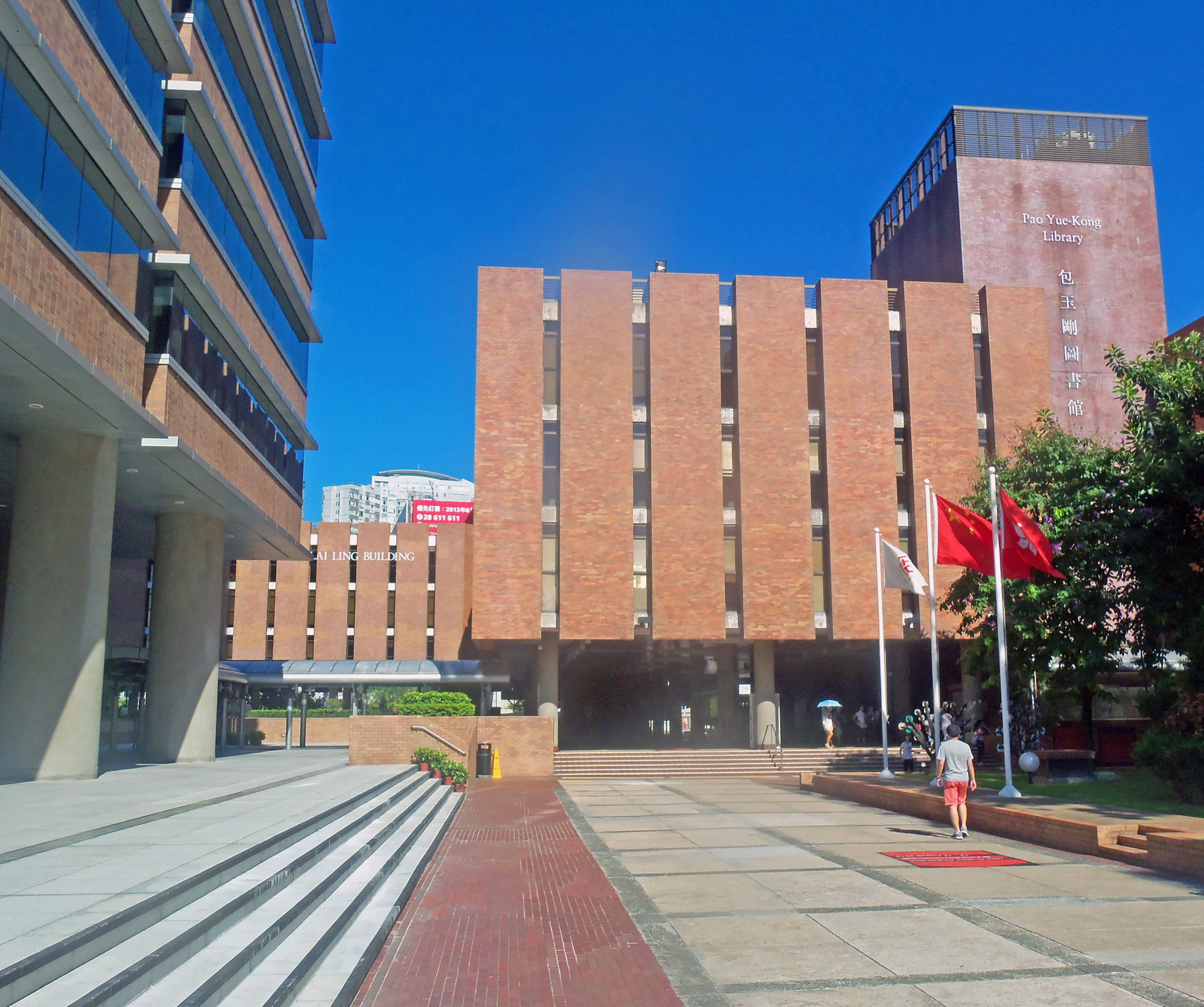
Exterior of PYK Library, 2013

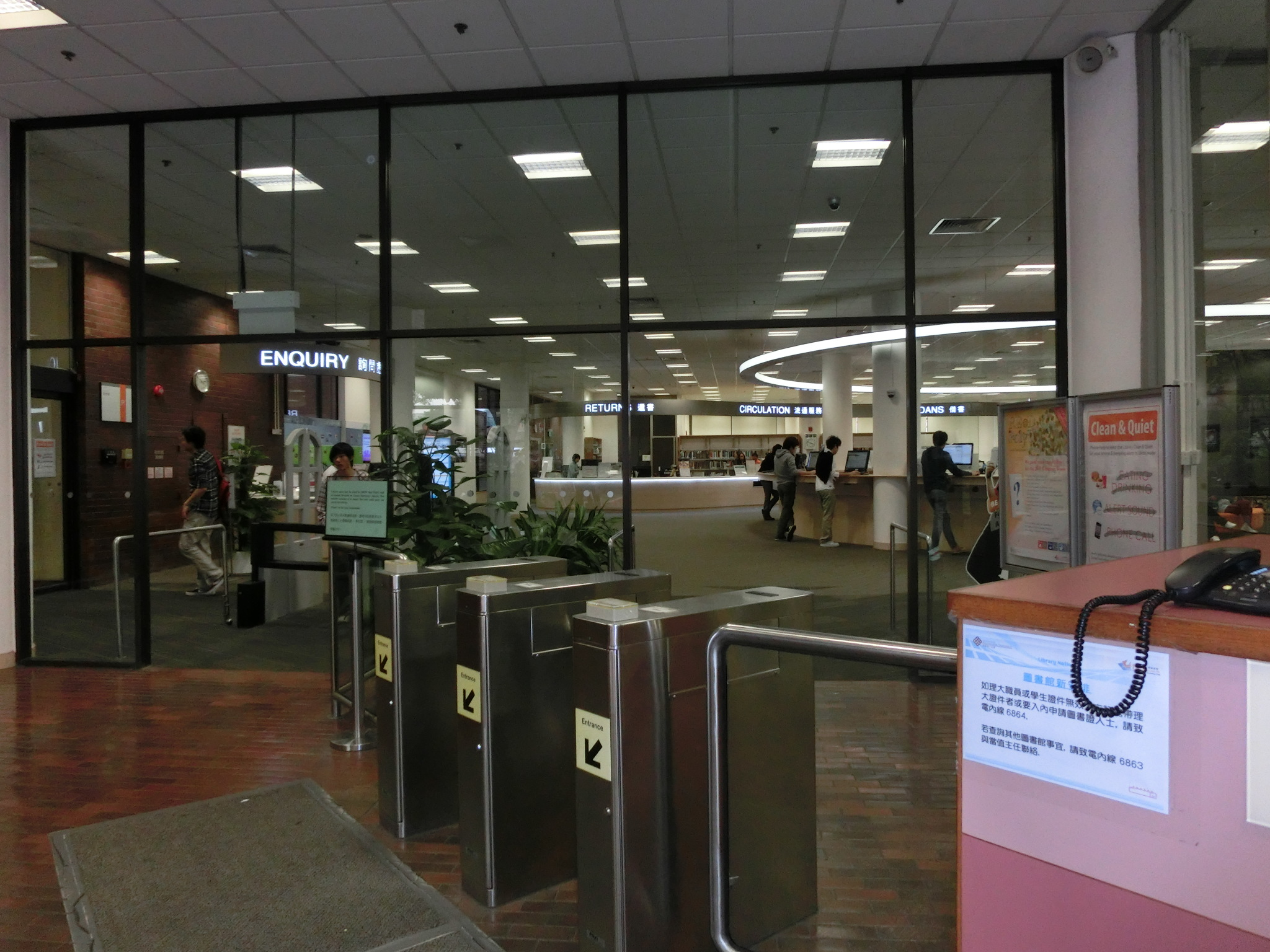
Gate Entrance, PYK Library, 2013

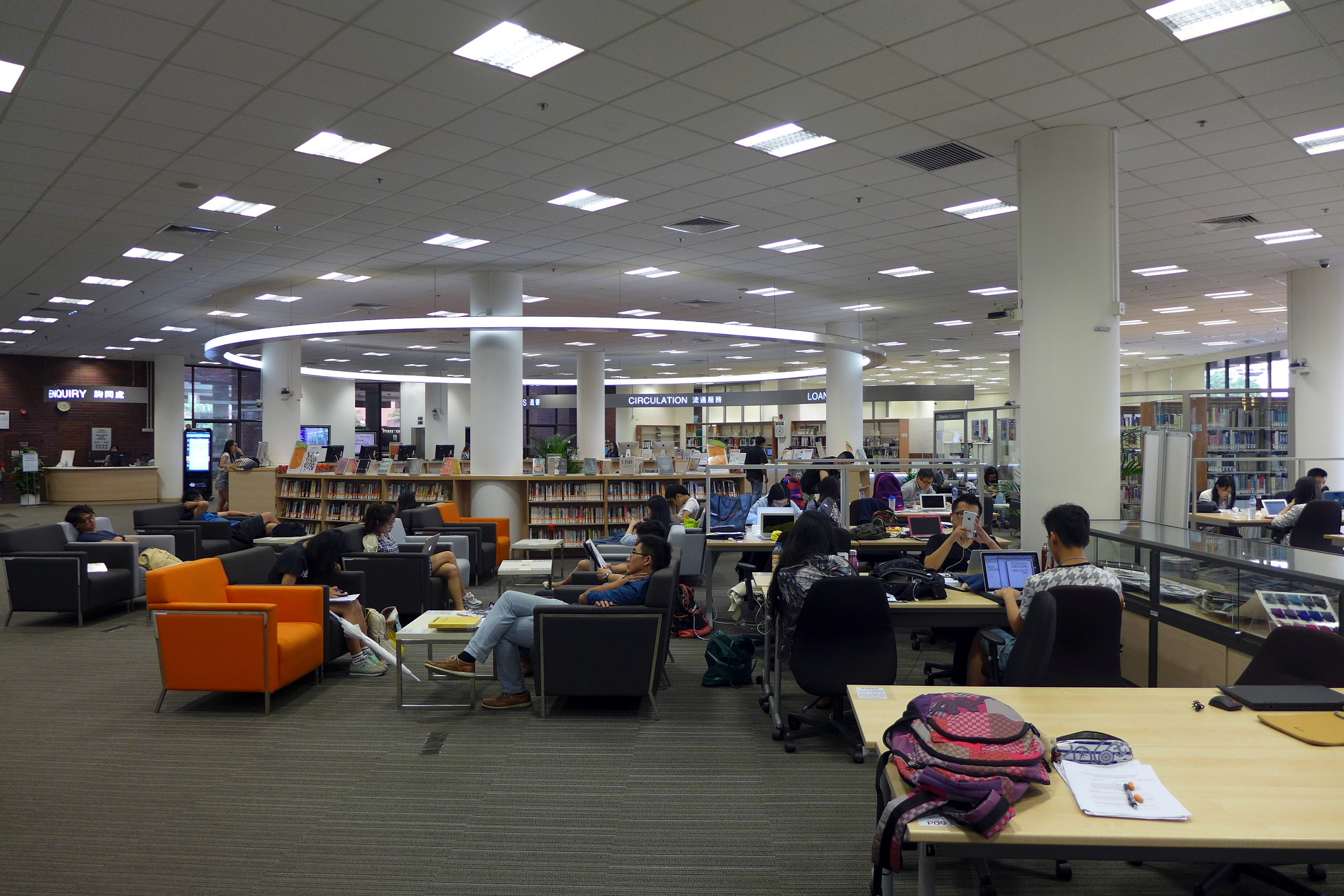
PF, PYK Library, 2015

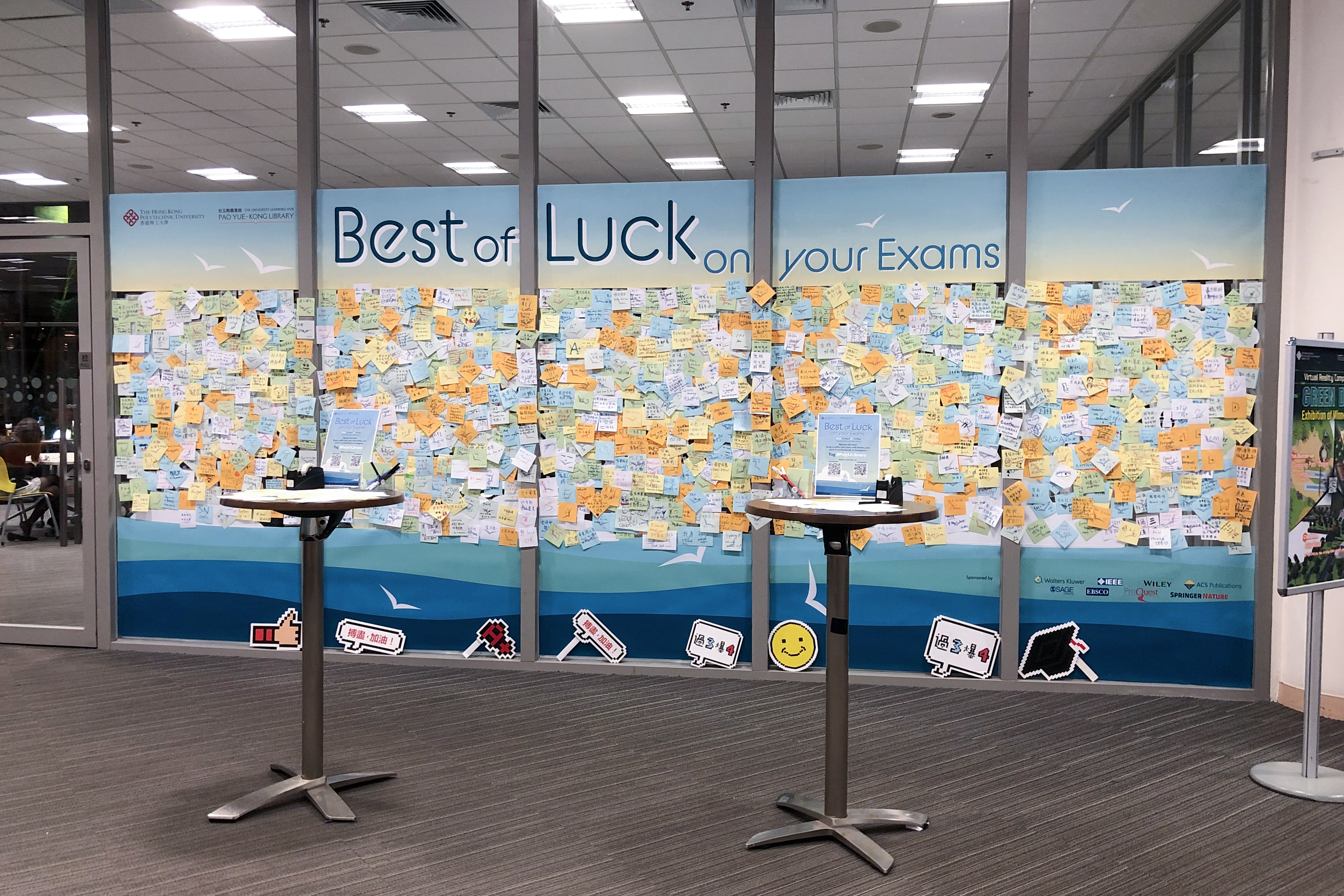
Exam Wishing Wall, PYK Library, 2019

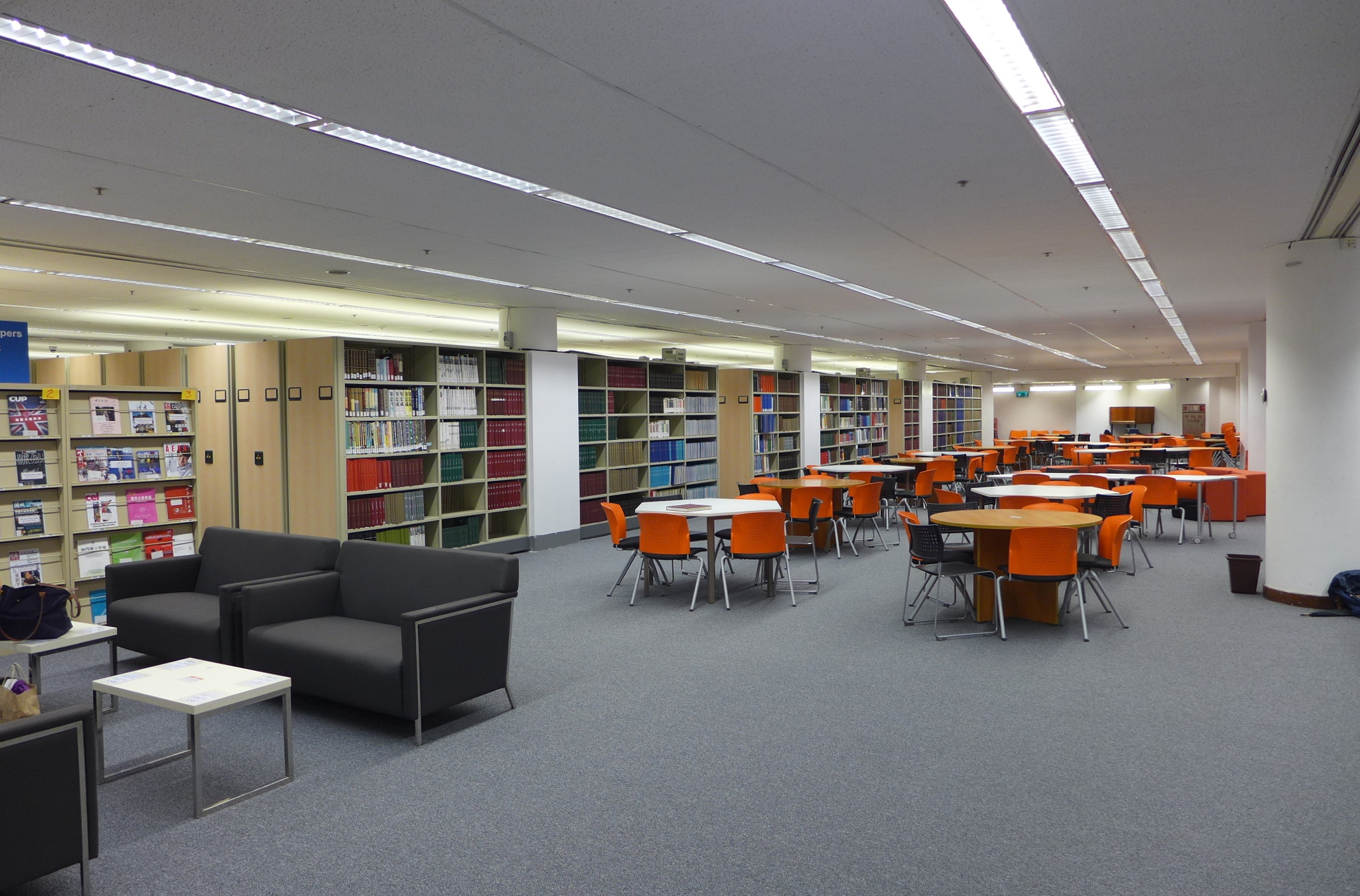
GF Discussion Zone, PYK Library

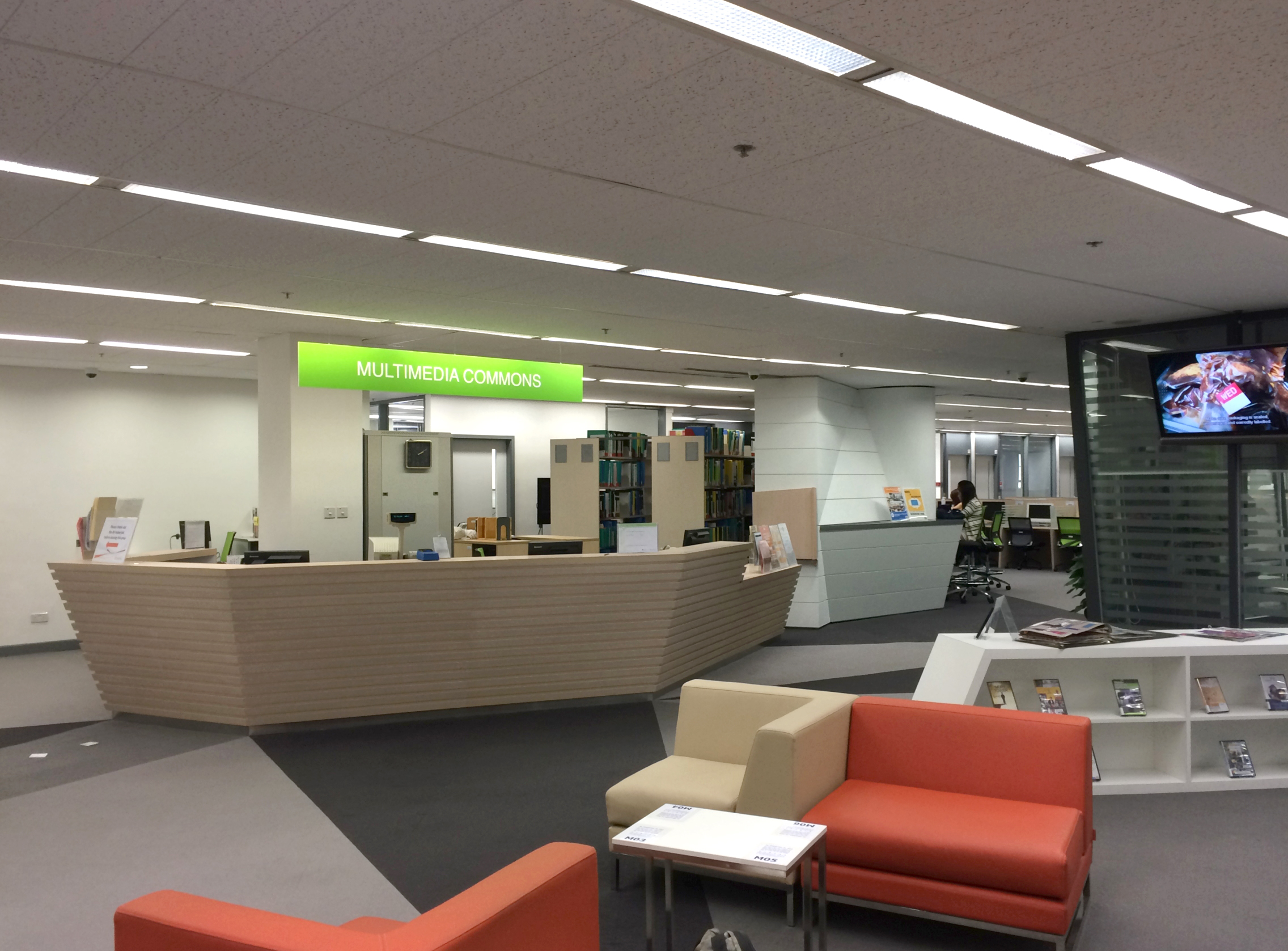
3F, PYK Library, 2015

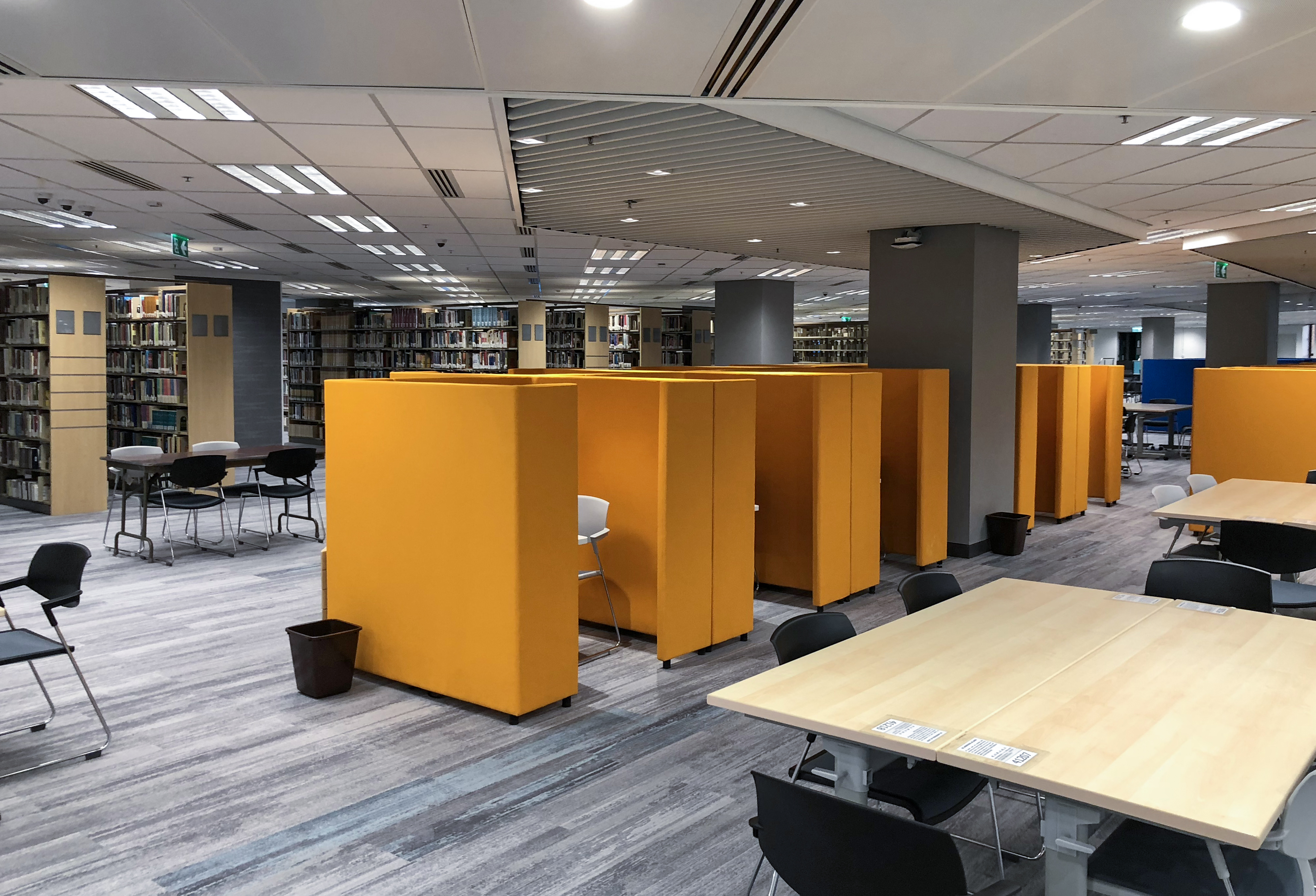
5F, PYK Library

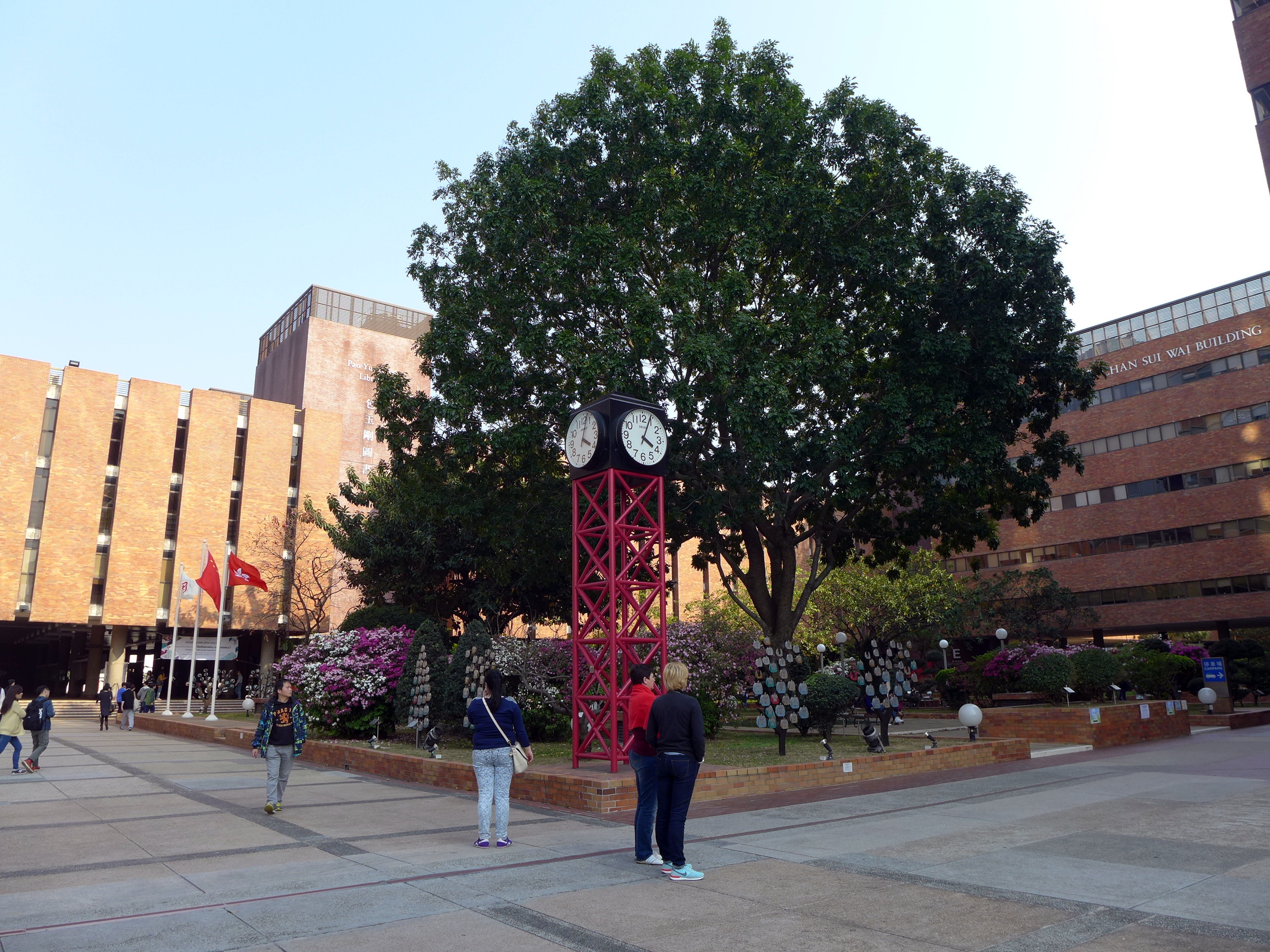
Outside PYK Library, 2014
