= Helmut Sohmen =

Austrian businessman and politician (1939–2025)

- 蘇海文
- Born: 10 December 1939; Linz, Reichsgau Oberdonau, Nazi Germany
- Died: 26 October 2025 (aged 85)
- Education: University of Vienna, Southern Methodist University, Northwestern University, Wesleyan University
- Occupation: Chairman of BW Group
- Spouse: Anna Pui Hing Pao
- Children: 3
- Relatives: Sir Yue-Kong Pao (father-in-law)

Helmut Sohmen (10 December 1939 – 26 October 2025) was an Austrian lawyer and businessman in Hong Kong. He was chairman of BW Group and a Hong Kong legislator. Sohmen was managing director of Dragon Air.

In 2010 he was on the Forbes list with an estimated fortune of US$1.4 billion, the fourth-placed Austrian. In 2009 he was listed as the 13th richest person in Hong Kong.

== Early life and education ==
On 10 December 1939, Sohmen was born in Linz, Reichsgau Oberdonau, Nazi Germany. He grew up in Linz.

In 1958, Sohmen graduated from the Linz Realgymnasium (Fadingerschule) with distinction. He then studied law at the University of Vienna and Southern Methodist University, and won a Fulbright scholarship to continue his studies at Wesleyan University in the United States, eventually receiving his doctorate in Vienna.

== Career ==
Sohmen's first job was as a legal adviser to the Royal Bank of Canada in Montreal. He interrupted his professional activity more than once to graduate as Master of Comparative Law (Southern Methodist University) and a Master of Laws.

Sir Yue-Kong Pao, Sohmen's father-in-law, owned World-Wide Shipping Group, one of the largest shipping companies in the world. In 1970 Sohmen moved with his family to Hong Kong in order to join the family business. After periods working in Bermuda (1974) and London (1977), in 1981 he finally settled in Hong Kong. With advancing age Pao gradually stepped back from day-to-day management and in 1986 Sohmen was appointed chairman of the World-Wide Shipping Group and Pao's ownership was passed to Sohmen's wife in 1989. In 2003 World-Wide completed the takeover of Norway's Bergesen fleet to become Bergesen Worldwide Ltd., since then renamed BW Group. The group includes 140 tankers and more than 4500 employees (2010).

In November 2014, Sohmen retired as chairman of BW Group. He was replaced by Andreas Sohmen-Pao, one of his sons.

=== Positions held ===
- From 1984 to 1996, he was a board member, and then from 1996 to 2005 Deputy Chairman of the Supervisory Board of HSBC. Finally from 1990 to 2007, he was a board member of parent company HSBC Holdings Plc.
- From 1985 to 1989 he was CEO of Dragon Air
- Until 1994, he was Director of Development at Harbour Centre Limited (Hong Kong Shipowners' Association), Hong Kong.
- President of the Baltic and International Maritime Council, Copenhagen.
- Legislator in the Hong Kong Legislative Council
- Chairman of the Hong Kong Austrian Association, Vienna.
- Board Member (1986–2001) and CEO (2001–2006) of the International Tanker Owners Pollution Federation, London
- First International Board Member of the Southern Methodist University Board of Trustees, 1999.
- 2000-2008 Hong Kong University of Science and Technology
- Vice President (1986–1989) and President (1989–1990) of the Hong Kong Chamber of Commerce
- Deputy Chairman (1996–1998) and Chairman (1998–2000) of the Pacific Basin Economic Council (PBEC)
- 2000 Member of the APEC Business Advisory Council (in conjunction with the Presidency at PBEC)
- Executive Committee Member (1998–2002), Vice President (2002–2003) and President (2003–2004) of the Hong Kong Club
- Chairman of the Hong Kong Academy for Performing Arts
- Chairman of the Commission on the Review of the ICAC
- Honorary President of the Austrian Society for the promotion of friendly and cultural relations with the PRC (ÖGCF)
- Founding President of the Far East Sohmen Foundation
- Member of the International Advisory Board to the Austrian Chancellor

== Personal life and death ==
In 1967, Sohmen married Anna Pui Hing Pao, whom he had met while studying in Canada. Sohmen had three children (two sons and one daughter).

Sohmen's wife Pui Hing Anna Pao Sohmen held several functions in Hong Kong and was also a member of the Chinese People's Political Consultative Conference. In 2005 she was awarded the Silver Bauhinia Star.

Sohmen died on 26 October 2025, at the age of 85.

== Awards ==
- 1990 Order of the British Empire
- 1995 nomination in the "Eminent Persons Group" by the European Commission (16-member advisory committee of the two economic blocs in the EU and ASEAN)
- 1998 Schumpeter Prize of the Schumpeter Society

== Foundations ==
Sohmen set up a number of foundations.

In 1987 he established the Egon Sohmen Foundation in memory of his brother Egon Sohmen (1930–1977). The Foundation promotes economic research and aims to get involved in important public policy debates. For this purpose it initiated its own star-studded annual international symposia and lectures at universities where Egon Sohmen formerly worked. It issued a separate publication. Scientific Advisor until 1999 Herbert Giersch, since 2002, Bernd Hans Jurgens.

With the aim of enabling young Austrians to have their first contacts with the Asian region, in 1991 Sohmen set up the Sohmen-Far East Foundation (SFEF). Operational headquarters of the advisory board of the foundation is in his home town of Linz. Qualified scholarship recipients through these grants have the opportunity to expand their horizons and to establish business contacts.

In 1993, Sohmen established the Sohmen-China Foundation for the Promotion of Austria Society (ÖGCF) to promote friendly and cultural relations with the PRC. It supports a variety of cultural and intellectual events and supports aid for visitation programs, educational concerns, activities in Austria and the publication of relevant publications. In 1996 and 2003 in Shanghai and Beijing on Tiananmen Square, it has co-organized exhibitions.
