= SS Golar Patricia =

Oil tanker

History

Liberia
- Name: SS Golar Patricia
- Owner: Gotaas-Larsen Shipping Company
- Builder: Kawasaki Heavy Industries
- Yard number: 1112
- Launched: 3 October 1969
- Homeport: Monrovia
- Identification: IMO number: 7002112
- Fate: Exploded and sank in 1973

General characteristics
- Tonnage: 98,894 GRT; 216,326 DWT
- Length: 327.1 metres (1,073 ft)
- Beam: 48.2 metres (158 ft)
- Draught: 25.3 metres (83 ft)
- Installed power: 20,594 kW (27,617 hp)
- Propulsion: Steam turbines
- Speed: 16.5 knots (30.6 km/h)
- Complement: 40

SS Golar Patricia was an oil tanker built by Kawasaki Heavy Industries of Sakaide in Japan for Gotaas-Larsen Shipping Company and launched in 1969. Gotaas-Larsen is a Norwegian company but it registered Golar Patricia in Monrovia to use the Liberian flag of convenience.

In November 1973 Golar Patricia was steaming in ballast from Coryton Refinery on the Thames Estuary in England to Bahrain in the Persian Gulf. On 5 November she was in the North Atlantic about 130 miles (210 kilometres) off the Canary Islands when she suffered three large explosions, caught fire and broke in two. One crew member, a Spanish national, died of burns, but the master (Harald Stormo), 38 officers and crew and three passengers successfully abandoned ship. The Spanish liner MV Cabo San Vicente rescued all survivors and landed them at Tenerife. Spanish authorities reported that ecological damage was minimal.

It was in the early 1970s that the first Inert Gas Systems were developed to improve safety on board tankers. During the previous docking at AFO Shipyard in Brest, France, a few weeks before, Golar Patricia had been retrofitted with such an installation. However, the normal docking time had not been enough to complete 100% of the work related to the crude oil tanks. This completion was done at sea, the ship being kept gas free during her ballast passage to Persian Gulf. No work had been done during the loaded passage back to Europe, and the commissioning of the new IG System was to be done after completion of the gas freeing operation during which the explosion occurred.

Golar Patricia was insured for $24,000,000. At the time of her sinking she was the largest ship ever lost at sea. This record was surpassed in 1976 by the loss of the ore-bulk-oil carrier MV Berge Istra.
