= BW Group =

Maritime company

BW Group Limited
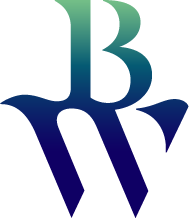
- Type: Private
- Industry: Shipping
- Founded: 1955
- Founder: Yue-Kong Pao
- Headquarters: Singapore and Oslo
- Area served: Global
- Key people: Chairman: Andreas Sohmen-Pao
- Number of employees: 12,000 (2022)
- Website: www.bw-group.com

BW Group is a maritime company involved in shipping, floating gas infrastructure and deep-water oil & gas production. The company has over 400 vessels managed by an international team of over 12,000 staff worldwide. The group was founded by Sir Yue-Kong Pao in Hong Kong in 1955 as World-Wide Shipping. In 2003, the company acquired Bergesen d.y. ASA, Norway's largest shipping company, which was founded in 1935 by Sigval Bergesen the Younger. In 2005, the business was re-branded as BW. With its LNG and LPG fleets combined, BW Group owns and operates the world's largest gas shipping fleet of more than 200 gas vessels, including five FSRUs (floating storage and regasification units). Hafnia, a member of the BW Group, operates the world's largest fleet of oil product tankers, and BW Offshore comprises the second largest number of floating oil and gas production units (FPSOs). BW's controlled fleet of over 400 ships also includes crude oil supertankers and dry bulk carriers.

BW Group currently comprises BW LNG, BW LPG, BW Epic Kosan, Hafnia, BW Dry Cargo, BW Offshore, BW Elara, BW ESS, BW Energy, Cadeler, BW Water, BW Ideol, Corvus Energy, and BW Digital.

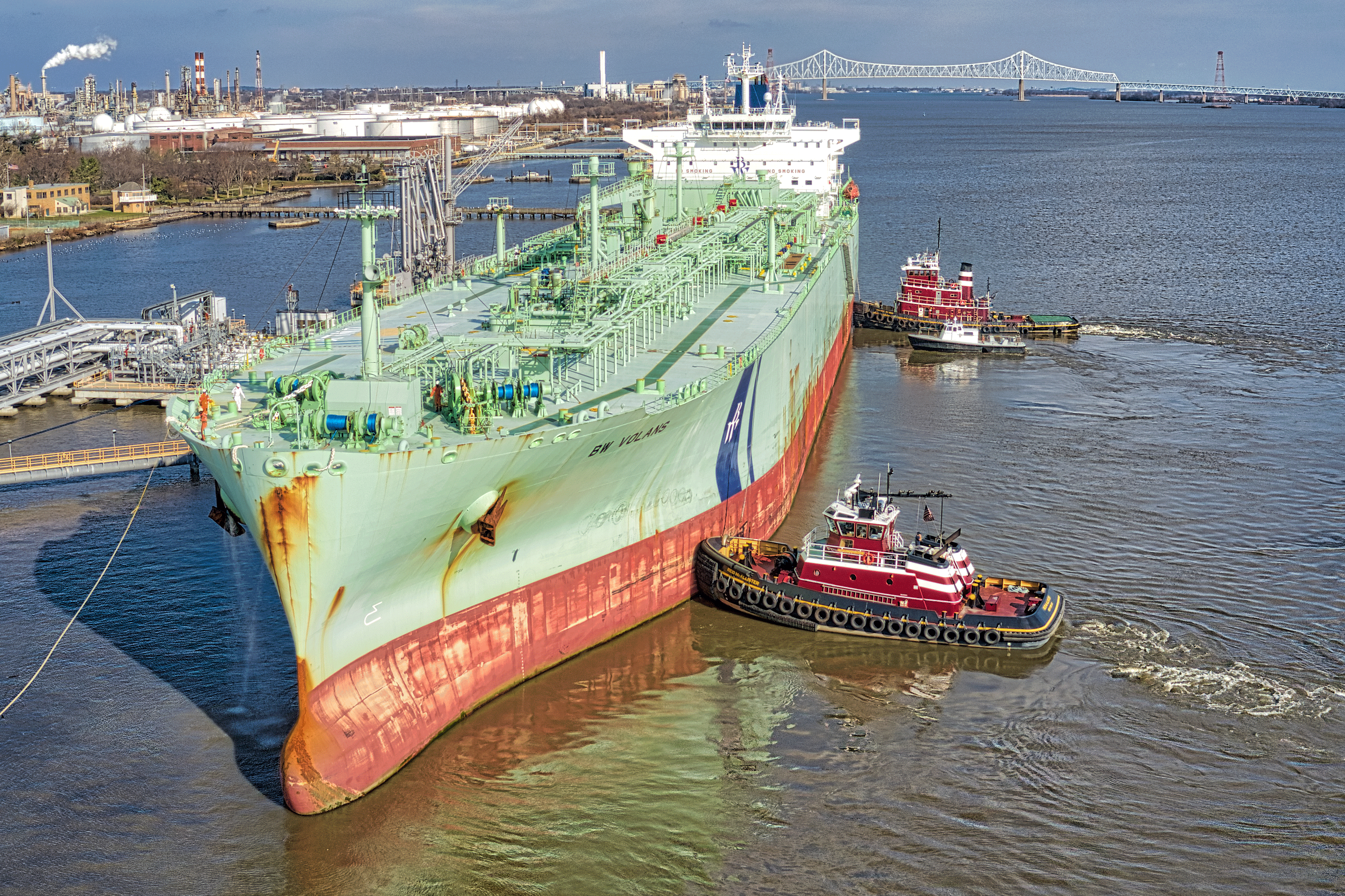
BW Volans, a Very Large Gas Carrier.

== Overview ==
BW Group is built on the foundations of two long-standing shipping businesses: World-Wide Shipping (founded by Sir Yue-Kong Pao) and Bergesen d.y., which was acquired by World-Wide in 2003.

In the late 1970s, two British Hongs were taken over by Chinese entrepreneurs: Hutchison Whampoa Ltd by Li Ka-Shing, and Kowloon Wharf by Sir Yue-Kong Pao. Sir Y.K. Pao was a native from Ningbo, Zhejiang province who came to Hong Kong in 1949 and acquired an aging ship to establish the Worldwide Shipping Company in 1955. At its peak in 1979, World-Wide had 204 ships totaling 20,500,000 tonnes deadweight (DWT). When the shipping downturn started in 1978, World-Wide sold tonnage while prices were still reasonable, paying off debt and building cash resources. In less than five years the fleet had halved in size, allowing World-Wide to avoid the crises suffered by many shipping companies.

In 1989, Pao passed on his interest in World-Wide to his eldest daughter, Anna Sohmen-Pao, shortly before his death in 1991. World-Wide was ranked as the sixth largest shipping fleet (number of vessels) in the world in 2004 and has been chaired by Helmut Sohmen, Pao's eldest daughter's husband, since 1986.

In late 2000, following a period of stake building starting in Bergesen d.y., the Sohmen family came to an agreement in March 2003 with Morten Bergesen and Petter Sundt, the controlling family shareholders, to buy their interest in Bergesen and mount a full public offering for all outstanding shares.

In 2004, following completion of this transaction, there was a reorganisation of the Sohmen family interests, with the creation of a new top holding company, Bergesen Worldwide Ltd., registered in Bermuda, which is owned 93% by the Sohmen family and 7% by HSBC. The holding company was subsequently renamed BW Group Limited.

In 2005, a further re-organisation took place, accompanied by the re-branding of the business under a single group brand, BW. BW Gas was listed in Oslo in October 2005 as a pure gas shipping company with BW Group retaining a majority share. BW Offshore followed suit by being listed in May 2006. The other assets remain in private ownership.

In 2009, BW Gas was privatised. On 21 November 2013, the LPG business was listed on the Oslo Stock Exchange as BW LPG.

== History ==
=== Background ===
BW Group is made up of two long-standing shipping businesses: World-Wide Shipping and Bergesen d.y. ASA, which was acquired by the former in 2003. To reflect this acquisition, a new holding company, Bergesen Worldwide Ltd. was incorporated in Bermuda. In 2005, the business was re-branded as BW.

=== World-Wide Shipping's beginnings ===
Sir Yue-Kong Pao (more commonly known as Sir Y.K. Pao) started World-Wide Steamship Company Limited with his father S.L. Pao, brother H.K. Pao and friends C.L. Pan, P.C. Lee, T.H. Chiang, A.P.Y. Waung, W.S. Cheng and Y.S. Zee. The new company was incorporated in Hong Kong in July 1955. The company's first ship Inchona, a 27-year old coal-burning steamer, was renamed Golden Alpha. Several other ships were quickly added to the fleet and were chartered by Japanese and Hong Kong companies. It was a decision that other ship-owners deemed unusual and risky although it soon paid off. In 1956 freight charges rose rapidly due to the closure of the Suez Canal during the Suez Crisis. Over the years, the company's fleet grew and by 1979 it had over 200 vessels and group tonnage of 20.5 million DWT, making it larger than the US and Soviet merchant fleets combined.

=== World-Wide's entry into tanker market and oil crises ===
During the 1960s, Sir Y.K. Pao was determined to enter the tanker market. However, his lack of experience meant oil companies refused to charter his vessels. He was rejected by Shell Oil and various American oil companies. Nonetheless, he managed to break into the market by acquiring a second-hand tanker that came attached with a charter. The tanker, renamed World Oriental, was soon joined by World Continental and World Universal. Pao continued approaching potential customers and then Standard Oil-Esso eventually gave him a chance. By 1964, Pao had nine tankers that were chartered by oil companies. The company's first very large crude carrier (VLCC) was constructed by Kawasaki Heavy Industries and named World Chief in 1969. Another 42 VLCCs were added to the fleet between 1970 and 1974 and most were constructed in Japan. World-Wide survived the first oil crisis as it had reliable charterers for its vessels. However, the company had to implement drastic measures to survive the second oil crisis. Anna Pao's husband, Dr. Helmut Sohmen convinced Pao of the severity of the crisis. The founder then promptly sold 140 ships within five years. The timely sales ensured that World-Wide Shipping was in a much better state than its competitors after the crisis as it was in a better position to cope with the increasing popularity of voyage charters and low freight costs.

=== Change of leadership ===
Sir Y.K. Pao retired in 1986 and Dr. Helmut Sohmen, who joined the company in 1970, took over. As shipyards were in a dismal state after the crisis and eager for new orders at low prices, World-Wide Shipping purchased six tankers from Hyundai Heavy Industries and Daewoo Shipbuilding & Marine Engineering before the market recovered and in time to enjoy the higher freight rates during the First Gulf War. World-Wide Shipping again commissioned Daewoo to build another six VLCCs and Daewoo would go on to be the main builder of World-Wide's ships.

=== Acquisition of Bergesen d.y. ASA ===
By 2000, Dr. Helmut Sohmen had identified two companies, Bergesen d.y. ASA and Iino Kaiun Kaisha, which had good management and assets. However, the share prices of both companies did not appear to wholly capture the value of the companies. The Sohmen family's investment management team began investing in both companies and continued stake building for two years. Although Sohmen had conveyed his friendly intentions, Iino's management sought to maintain the status quo and did not want World-Wide to hold more shares than the largest shareholder. Respecting Iino's wishes, World-Wide called off the plan and sold off its shares at a profit. Bergesen cousins Morten Bergesen and Petter C. G. Sundt, grandchildren of founder Sigval Bergesen d.y., reacted more positively. They were firm that any offer for their shares would have to be extended to all other shareholders as well. By March 2003 the cousins had accepted World-Wide's offer. World-Wide then mounted a public offer and accumulated over 90% of the shares. The acquisition received considerable media attention as Bergesen was both Norway's largest shipping company and also one of its best. Both groups achieved a high degree of cooperation and continuity and a new holding company, Bergesen Worldwide Ltd, was soon incorporated in Bermuda in 2004 to reflect this acquisition. In 2005 the business was rebranded under a single group brand, BW.

=== Bergesen's beginnings ===
Sigval Bergesen d.y. hailed from a shipping family. His great-grandfather Berge Bergesen started a shipping company in 1840 and his father Sigval Bergesen founded his own in 1887. Sigval Bergesen d.y. joined his father's company in 1916 and after disagreeing with his father's refusal to commission two large 15,000 DWT tankers from Odense Steel Shipyard (which was owned by A.P. Møller), left the company with one of its contracts. He soon established his own company, then named Sig. Bergesen d.y. & Co., on 20 February 1935. The company was run by his partner, Erland Bassøe, for over four years after Sigval Bergesen d.y. accepted A.P. Møller's job offer and served as the latter's right-hand man. The company first ship, Président de Vogüé, was launched in May 1935. Charles Racine, named after Sigval Bergesen d.y.'s grandfather, joined the fleet in 1937 and Anders Jahre, named after the famed Norwegian shipping tycoon, was acquired in 1939.

=== The Bergesen Fleet during the Second World War ===
Just before the Second World War, Sigval Bergesen d.y. shifted the company headquarter from Stavanger to Oslo to facilitate communication with business contacts. The Stavanger office became a branch office which continued to be overseen by Erland Bassøe. During the war, the company's fleet of Président de Vogüé, Charles Racine, and Anders Jahre was considered modern for its time and also fully in operation. The ships temporary entered the management and operation of the Norwegian Shipping and Trade Mission (Nortraship). Charles Racine was sunk by three torpedoes on 10 March 1942 although her whole crew was rescued. Anders Jahre continued sailing independently most of the time although she joined a convoy whenever she sailed from the Persian Gulf or an Indian Port. The last ship, Président de Vogüé, was active in the Atlantic Ocean during the war. When she sailed into Stavanger's port on 20 May 1945, she was the first ship under Nortraship to return to Norway.

=== Rosenberg Shipyard ===
Years of working for A.P. Møller, no doubt convinced Sigval Bergesen d.y. of the strategic importance of having a shipyard. After learning that Norges Bank intended to sell its Rosenberg Mekaniske Verksted shares, Sigval Bergesen d.y. bought those shares at a price decided by the bank. As such, he gained a quarter of the shipyard's shares and would later go on to secure full ownership. Rosenberg delivered Berge Bergesen, a 16000 DWT vessel, in 1951 and then Crown Princess Märtha of Norway was the ship's sponsor. At the point of its creation, it was the largest vessel ever constructed in Norway. Initially Rosenberg's building berth could only fit vessels of 33000 DWT and below. A larger dry dock that could fit vessels of 85000 DWT and below was built to meet the company's demand for greater tonnage. The shipyard was also expanded in the 1960s so it could construct even bigger vessels of up to 160000 DWT. Nonetheless, after nearly 27 years, 43 vessels and much investment in the shipyard's facilities, it became apparent that Rosenberg could no longer fulfil the company's needs and was sold off on 1 January 1970. During its years under Bergesen's ownership, Rosenberg was graced by many notable guests. King Haakon VII, Crown Princess Märtha, King Olav V, Princess Astrid and Norwegian Prime Minister Einar Gerhardsen were some of the illustrious visitors to the shipyard.

=== Sigval Bergesen d.y.'s retirement ===
Sigval Bergesen d.y. retired in 1976 at the age of 83. The control of his company went to Jacob E. Jacobsen and Sigval Bergesen d.y.'s grandsons Morten Sigval Bergesen and Petter C. G. Sundt. Jacob E. Jacobsen had been with the company since the very start while both grandsons were made partners a year before taking over the leadership. Sigval Bergesen d.y. died on 7 May 1980 at the age of 87.

=== Starting and expanding a gas tanker fleet ===
In 1974, Fearnley & Eger, a shipping company likewise based in Norway, decided to expand its gas tanker fleet and commissioned seven gas carriers. One order was passed to Bergesen and another to Gotaas-Larsen A/S. However, Fearnley & Eger faced financial difficulty in seeing the remaining deals through and another four of their contracts were transferred to Bergesen. Bergesen would also acquire the other vessel from Gotaas-Larsen A/S. These six LPG tankers were the first of Bergesen's gas tanker fleet. By the late 1980s, Bergesen was a prominent owner and operator of large LPG tankers. In 1999, it was decided that Bergesen would specialise in large and very large gas carriers while A.P. Møller managed small gas carriers and Exmar focused on medium gas carriers.

=== Going public and expansion ===
On 1 January 1986, the various companies under Bergesen d.y. Group were merged and renamed Bergesen d.y. A/S. The company was listed on Oslo Børs a few months later on the 9th of September. The company also began acquiring other companies. It acquired Den Norske Amerikalinje in 1995 but soon sold it to Wilh. Wilhelmsen Holding ASA. Its acquisition of Havtor AS, a gas carrier company, in 1996 increased its fleet size to over 90 vessels and cemented its position as a leading shipping company. Bergesen also diversified with its purchase of large ore carriers and FPSOs. Between 1986 and 2000, Bergesen acquired many large ore carriers including Berge Stahl (the biggest ore carrier in the world at 364767 DWT until Vale Brasil broke the record in 2011), Bergeland, Berge Nord, Berge Atlantic, Berge Pacific, and Berge Arctic. The company also had experience in the offshore sector with pipe-laying ship Berge Worker and FPSOs Berge Sisar and Berge Troll. As such, after negotiating with Statoil, it succeeded in attaining shared ownership of Berge Hugin which was converted into an FPSO in 1998.

=== Acquisition and delisting ===
World-Wide Shipping acquired the cousins' shares in April 2003. World-Wide then mounted a public offer and accumulated over 90% of the shares and Bergesen was privatised.

=== Leadership of BW Group ===
In 1990 third-generation leadership joined the company with Dr. Helmut Sohmen's eldest son, Andreas Sohmen-Pao. Sohmen-Pao has an M.B.A. with distinction from Harvard Business School and a double first class Honours Degree (B.A. Hons) from Oxford University in Oriental Studies in 1993. He worked at Goldman Sachs International in London before joining World-Wide Shipping in London, serving positions in various divisions of World-Wide Shipping before assuming the role of BW Group CEO in 2009. Sohmen-Pao stepped down as Chief Executive Officer of BW Group on April 1, 2015. After 44 years with the company, Dr. Sohmen retired in 2014 as Chairman of BW Group and his son Andreas Sohmen-Pao assumed that role.

== Companies under BW Group ==
=== Overview ===
The BW Group currently comprises BW LNG, BW LPG, BW Epic Kosan, Hafnia, BW Dry Cargo, BW Offshore, BW Elara, BW ESS, BW Energy, Cadeler, BW Water, BW Ideol, Corvus Energy, and BW Digital.

=== BW LPG ===
BW LPG owns and operates the world's largest fleet of liquefied petroleum gas carriers. The company specializes in transportation and floating storage services and operates in 9 countries. BW Gas was listed in Oslo Stock Exchange in October 2005 as a pure gas shipping company with the BW Group retaining a majority share. BW Offshore followed suit and was listed in May 2006. In 2009, BW Gas was delisted. On 21 November 2013, the LPG business was listed on the Oslo Stock Exchange as BW LPG. CEO Kristian Sorensen, CFO Samantha Xu, and Executive Vice President, Commercial Niels Rigault, oversee and manage the company's operations in 12 countries.

=== BW LNG ===
BW has been involved in LNG shipping since the early 1970s. In the early 2000s, the company expanded its LNG activities to take advantage of the growth in LNG transportation, securing a number of long-term charters.

Its current fleet comprises over 30 vessels, including FSRUs and newbuildings. The company's first Floating Storage Regasification Unit (FSRU), BW Singapore, was delivered in 2015. It is headed by CEO Yngvil Asheim, Executive Vice President of LNG Shipping Petter Lindvig Larsøn, Executive Vice President of Gas Solutions Akbar Sha, Executive Vice President of IT and Digitalization Harald Martin Myhre, Executive Vice President of Technical and Head of Fleet Management Helge Drange.

=== BW Epic Kosan ===
EBW Epic Kosan owns and operates the world’s largest fleet of gas carriers providing seaborne services for the transportation of liquefied petroleum gas and petrochemicals. The Company controls a fleet of 76 vessels which serve the international supply chains of leading oil majors and commodity traders throughout Asia, Europe, Africa, and the Americas. The Company has capacity across pressurised, semi-refrigerated, refrigerated gas and petrochemical transportation.

=== Hafnia ===
Hafnia ((OSL): HAFNI) is one of the world's leading tanker owners, transporting oil, oil products and chemicals for major national and international oil companies, chemical companies, as well as trading and utility companies. Hafnia has its headquarters in Singapore, and other offices in Copenhagen, Houston, Dubai and a presence in both Manila, Mumbai and Monaco.

As Owners and Operators of over 200 vessels, Hafnia offers technical management, commercial and chartering services, pool management, and a large-scale bunker desk. Hafnia has offices in Singapore, Copenhagen, Houston, and Dubai and currently employs over 4000 employees onshore and at sea.

Hafnia is managed by CEO Mikael Skov and CFO Perry Van Echtelt, alongside its Executive Management Team, which is composed of Jens Christophersen, EVP, Commercial, Mia Krogslund Jørgensen, VP, People, Culture & Strategy, Søren Steenberg Jensen, EVP, Asset Management, and Ralph Juhl, EVP, Technical.

In December 2025, it was announced that Hafnia had completed the acquisition of approximately 14 per cent of TORM from Oaktree Capital Management for US$311.43 million. The transaction involved around 14.1 million TORM A-shares and resulted in Hafnia becoming a significant minority shareholder.

=== BW Dry Cargo ===
BW Dry Cargo was established in March 2016. BW Dry Cargo acts purely as a tonnage provider. The company has a fleet of bulk carriers ranging from Supramax to Capesize.

=== BW Offshore ===
BW Offshore is a provider of floating production services to the oil and gas industry. It operates the world's second largest floating oil and gas production fleet (FPSOs), with more than 15 units in the US, Brazil, Mexico, West Africa, North Sea, and Australasia. The company has executed 40 FPSO and Floating Storage and Offloading (FSO) projects. and was listed on the Oslo Stock Exchange in 2006. CEO Marco Beenen, CFO Ståle Andreassen, CCO Rune Bjorbekk, and COO Kei Ikeda oversee and manage the company's operations in 12 countries.

=== BW Energy Storage Systems ===
BW Energy Storage Systems (BW ESS) is an investor in the battery energy storage systems (BESS) space, with projects in the United Kingdom, and an investment focus that also spans Europe, Australia, and the United States.

=== BW Energy ===
Established in 2016, BW Energy is an oil and gas company involved in the acquisition, development, and production of proven oil and natural gas fields. BW Energy has access to existing FPSOs to reduce time to first oil and cash flow with lower investments than traditional offshore developments. The main assets are 73.5% of the producing Dussafu Marine Permit offshore Gabon and a 95% interest in the Maromba field in Brazil, both operated by the company. Total net 2P+2C reserves were 247 million barrels at the start of 2020.

=== BW Digital ===
BW Digital is a subsidiary of BW Group, a company involved in shipping, maritime infrastructure, and new sustainable technologies. Headquartered in Singapore, BW Digital develops, funds and operates digital infrastructures in the Asia-Pacific region. It is the owner and developer of Hawaiki and Hawaiki Nui submarine cables, and Datagrid datacentre.

=== BW Water ===
BW Water is a supplier of water and wastewater systems for the industrial, municipal marketplace. BW Water has experience in the design and implementation of water and wastewater treatment systems.

=== BW Ideol ===
BW Ideol makes floating foundations for offshore wind, enabling access to deeper water and the additional space and wind power associated with that. In February 2021, BW Offshore became a strategic owner of Ideol S.A., creating a renewable energy company (named BW Ideol). BW Ideol has a dual-leg growth strategy as a floater EPCI and maintenance services provider, and as a wind-farm project developer and co-owner. BW Ideol has two full-scale offshore floating wind turbines in operation in France and Japan, a significant project pipelines.

=== Coruvs Energy ===
Founded in 2009, Corvus provides maritime batteries for marine, oil & gas and port applications. Corvus now has the largest installed base of ESS, with the largest number of projects completed in the maritime industry.

=== Cadeler ===
Cadeler is a supplier within the offshore wind industry for installation services and operation and maintenance works Cadeler has delivered numerous commercial scale offshore wind projects across Northern Europe, using its two Windfarm Installation Vessels (WIVs), Wind Orca and Wind Osprey.
