= Tor Olav Trøim =

Norwegian businessman and engineer (born 1963)

Tor Olav Trøim (born 4 March 1963) is a Norwegian businessman and engineer. He used to hold a number of executive and board positions in John Fredriksen-controlled companies, and was often described as his right hand. Trøim graduated as MSc Naval Architect from the University of Trondheim, Norway in 1985. Trøim is a Norwegian citizen and is resident in the UK. His career includes Portfolio Manager Equity in Storebrand ASA (1987– 1990), and CEO for the Norwegian Oil Company DNO AS (1992–1995).

Since 1995, Trøim has been a director of SeaTankers Management in Cyprus, taking the Greenwich Group to the public markets. In this function he has acted as CEO for the public companies Frontline Ltd (NYSE), Golar LNG Ltd (NASDAQ) and SeaDrill Ltd (OSE). Trøim is currently Chairman of Golar LNG Energy Ltd., Independent Tanker Corporation Ltd., Aktiv Kapital.

He has since 2004 been vice president of Golden Ocean Group and since 2001 of Golar LNG, as well as Knightsbridge Tankers Limited and Ship Finance International. He also sits on the board of Aktiv Kapital and Marine Harvest.

Trøim graduated from the Norwegian Institute of Technology, Trondheim, in 1985 with a graduate marine engineering degree. He worked as a portfolio manager for Storebrand (1987–90) and later as CEO of DNO (1992–95). In 1995 he joined SeaTankers Management of Cyprus, when he became part of the John Fredriksen sphere, and became CEO of Frontline. He has also been CEO of Seadrill.

== Personal life ==
He romantically engaged with businesswoman Celina Midelfart in 2009, and the couple had their first child, Olav, while they were living in London in 2011. The couple separated, and their son lives in Oslo with her.
