= BW Gas =

Norwegian gas shipping company

BW Gas ASA
- Company type: Public
- Industry: Shipping
- Founded: 1935; 91 years ago
- Headquarters: Oslo, Norway
- Revenue: US$517.3 million (2005)
- Operating income: $186.0 million (2005)
- Net income: $448.0 million (2005)
- Website: www.bwgas.com

BW Gas (OSE: GAS), previously known as Bergesen Worldwide Gas, is the world's largest gas shipping company and is part of the Bergesen Worldwide Group. The company has 98 gas carriers with a total of 4,688,531 tonnes deadweight (DWT) transporting liquefied natural gas (LNG) and liquefied petroleum gases (propane and butane). The company has its headquarters in Oslo, Norway and is listed on Oslo Stock Exchange.

== History ==
Bergesen Worldwide started as Bergesen d.y. when it was founded by Sigval Bergesen d.y. in 1935. He built up a major tanking fleet and left the business to his grandchildren Petter C.G. Sundt and Morten Sig. Bergesen in 1976 and the company changed from primarily a tanker to a gas carrier operator. The company grew in the gas sector throughout the 1980s and 1990s. In 2003 Bergesen was merged with World-Wide Shipping and became Bergesen Worldwide. The merger resulted in Bergesen Worldwide Gas to become demerged and listed on Oslo Stock Exchange in 2005.
