= Michael Turner (banker) =

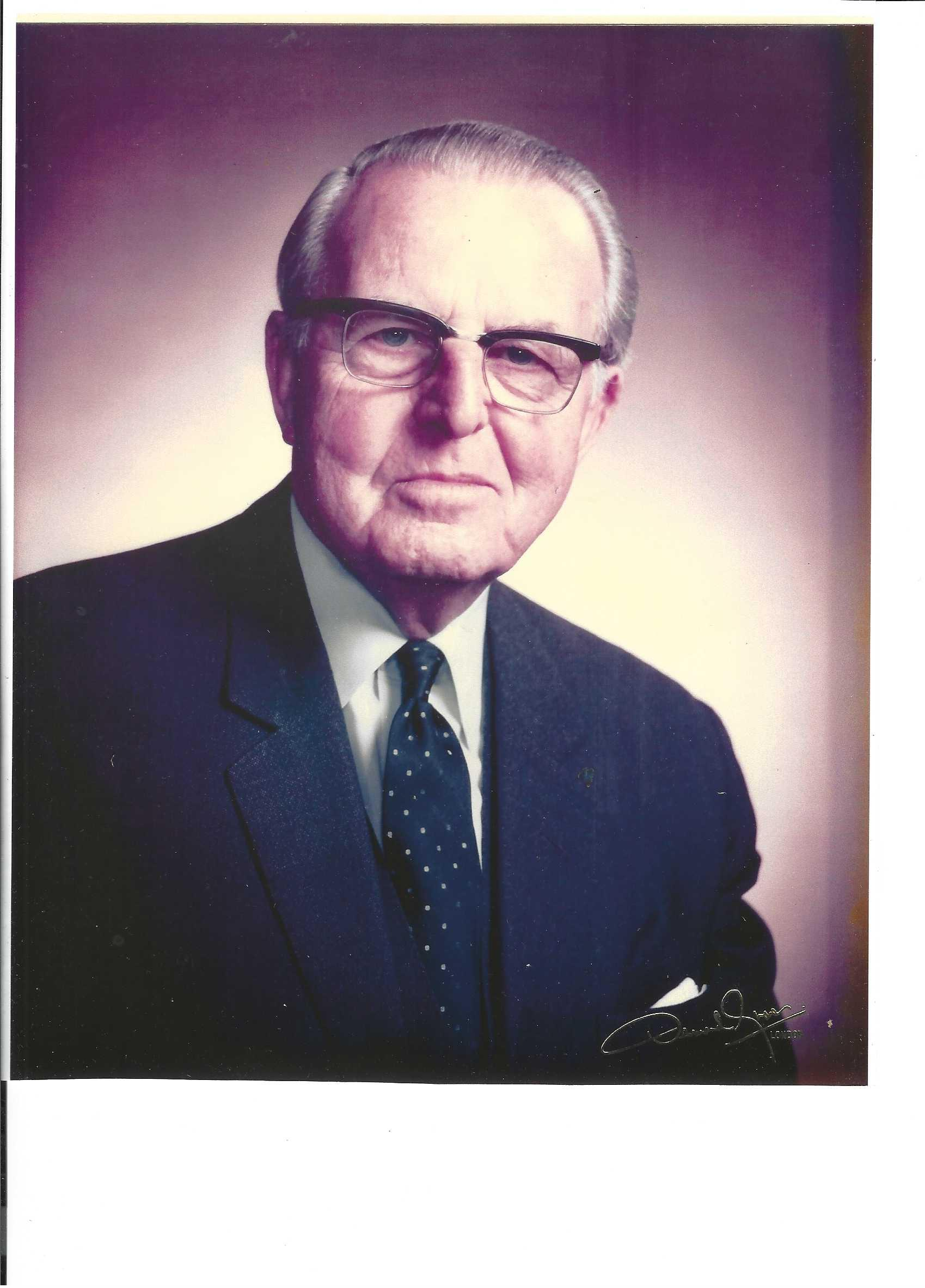

Sir Michael William Turner (1905 - 27 September 1980) was a banker for Hong Kong and Shanghai Bank and commandant of the auxiliary police in Hong Kong.

== Early life ==
Turner was born in Winchester, England, in 1905. He was the son of Skinner Turner, at that time Judge of the British Court for Siam in Bangkok and later Chief Judge of the British Supreme Court for China based in Shanghai.

== Education ==
Turner studied at Marlborough College and then University College, Oxford and obtained a degree in military history. He played field hockey with the English national field hockey team.

== Career ==
Upon graduation, Turned joined the London office of the Hong Kong and Shanghai Bank (HSBC) and was then posted to Shanghai. Turner was later transferred to Singapore where he was interned in Changi Prison for the duration of World War II. It took him six months to recover from the conditions in the camp.

After the war, Turner resumed his career with HSBC and, in 1953, succeeded Sir Arthur Morse as Chief Manager of HSBC. Turner was instrumental in the considerable post-war expansion of the bank. In 1962, Turner retired from HSBC in Hong Kong.

In Hong Kong, Turner also served as the Commander of the Hong Kong Auxiliary Police Force.

Following retirement in 1963, Turner served as Chairman of the British Bank of the Middle East.

== Personal life ==
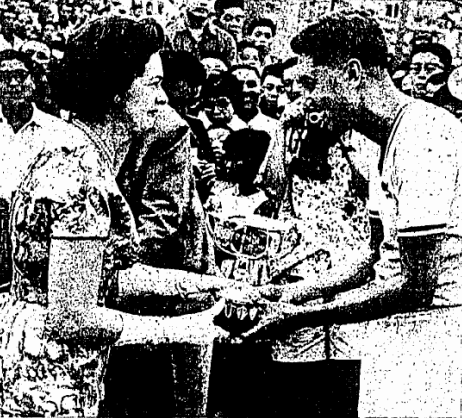
Lady Turner presenting a cup to Benny Omar, captain of the Emergency Unit, Hong Kong Auxiliary Police, in 1961

In 1938, Turner married Wendy Spencer Stranack, daughter of Morriss Stranack, at the Holy Trinity Cathedral in Shanghai, China. Morriss Stranack lived in Shanghai, China and he was originally from Durban, South Africa. Michael and Wendy Turner had three sons.

On 27 September 1980, Michael Turner died in London, England.

== Awards and recognition ==
Turner was awarded a Colonial Police Medal in 1956 for his services to the Hong Kong Auxiliary Police Force.

He was awarded a CBE in 1957 and was knighted in 1961.

A Turner Room on Level 41 of the main Hong Kong branch of HSBC commemorates his services to the bank.

Business positions
Preceded by Sir Arthur Morse	Chief Manager of Hongkong and Shanghai Banking Corporation; 1953–1962	Succeeded by Sir John Saunders
Preceded by Cedric Blaker	Chairman of the Hongkong and Shanghai Banking Corporation; 1959–1962	Succeeded by Hugh Barton
