= Yue-Kong Pao =

Hong Kong businessman (1918–1991)

- 包玉剛
- Born: 10 November 1918; Ningbo, Zhejiang, Republic of China (1912-1949)
- Died: 23 September 1991 (aged 72); British Hong Kong
- Occupations: Founder, Worldwide Shipping Group
- Spouse: Huang Sue-Ing
- Children: Doreen Pao; Cissy Pui-lai Pao Watari; Anna Pui-Hing Pao Sohmen; Bessie Pui-Yung Pao Woo
- Parent: Pao Siu-Loong; Pao Chung Sau-Gin
- Relatives: Helmut Sohmen, Peter Woo (sons-in-law)
- Awards: Knight Bachelor (1978); CBE (1976)

Chinese name
- Traditional Chinese: 包玉剛
- Simplified Chinese: 包玉刚
Transcriptions
Standard Mandarin
- Hanyu Pinyin: Bāo Yùgāng
- Wade–Giles: Pao Yü-kang
Yue: Cantonese
- Yale Romanization: Bāau Yuhk gōng
- Jyutping: Baau^{1} Juk^{6} gong^{1}

Sir Yue-Kong Pao CBE JP (Chinese: 包玉剛; pinyin: Bāo Yùgāng; 10 November 1918 — 23 September 1991), was the founder of Hong Kong's Worldwide Shipping Group, which at one point was the largest shipping company in the world. Anticipating the seriousness of the shipping downturn starting in the late 1970s, he diversified his interests, notably through the purchase of a controlling stake in The Hong Kong and Kowloon Wharf and Godown Company and later Wheelock Marden, giving exposure to Hong Kong real estate, retail, and transportation.

He was noted for his unmatched access to leaders in both the commercial and political arenas and was equally at ease with Western political leaders and the Chinese leadership in the run-up to Hong Kong's handover to China on 1 July 1997. He was also a philanthropist, notably in educational projects, helping set up universities, libraries, and scholarships.

== Early life ==
Pao was born in 1918 in Ningbo, the third of seven children of an upper-middle-class family. He was a 29th-generation descendant of Bao Zheng. In 1931, he went to Hankou to work in his father's shoe manufacturing business whilst continuing his education at night. However, he decided that the shoe business did not suit him and he secured a traineeship with a foreign insurance company. By the age of twenty, he was established in his new position and married his wife Huang Sue-Ing, who was chosen by his parents.

In 1937, Hankou came under attack from the Japanese, and Pao along with 70 colleagues moved to Hunan and then Shanghai whilst leaving his wife in the relative safety of Ningbo. As tension eased, he sent for his wife to join him.

== Career ==
In the late 1930s in Shanghai, Pao found a position in the insurance department of the Central Trust of China. Pao was soon moving up the corporate ladder, moving into the area of banking, and moving to Hengyang and Chongqing as the progress of the war dictated.

In 1945, at the end of the war, he was sent by the Government back to Shanghai to help set up and manage the new Municipal Bank and in a short time had worked his way to Deputy general manager, effectively in charge.

=== Move to Hong Kong ===
Pao fled to Hong Kong in 1949, prior to the end of the Chinese Civil War, having managed to remit much of the family's assets and money before events made it impossible. It was impossible to resume a banking career and, given the prevailing uncertainties, he did not wish to commit to investing in machinery and land in Hong Kong, so Pao started an Import/Export business dealing in Chinese goods. Following the UN trade embargo resulting from China's entry into the Korean War, the company broadened its scope to Europe, although trade with China continued in a circuitous way through skilful exploitation of legal loopholes in the embargo. It was during the first half of the 1950s that Pao first made contact with Jake Saunders (who was running the Imports Department) and Guy Sayer (also working in the department) at the Hongkong and Shanghai Banking Corporation. Both were later to become Chief Manager and chairman of the bank, and the relationship was to be a decisive element in the growth of Pao's businesses.

=== Founding of World-Wide Shipping ===
As his business grew, Pao looked around for suitable new ventures and in 1955 decided to branch into shipping (still focusing on assets that were not fixed in Hong Kong) and embarked on an intensive learning process. Shipowning in Hong Kong had a poor reputation at that time with the banks and so the first vessel, a 28-year-old coal burning 8,200 tonne freighter, was purchased without finance. Having seen this and the rigorousness employed by Pao in the purchase process, the Hongkong Bank extended a loan for the second purchase, the start of long and fruitful relationship which led to Pao being appointed to the board of the bank in 1971 and later to become its vice-chairman.

The shipping business grew rapidly driven by the post war economic miracle taking place in Japan and the resulting need for freight and oil carrying capacity. Pao devised a system whereby he was able to secure bank guaranteed three-year charters prior to purchasing ships thus significantly reducing the business risks and creating a very attractive lending opportunity for the banks financing the ship purchase. This basic scheme (known in Japan as a "shikumisen" arrangement) was extended when World-Wide moved into commissioning construction of new ships in 1961.

By 1979, the fleet was some 202 vessels with a total of 20.5 million DWT, by far and away the largest fleet in the world. Indeed, the fleet was larger than the combined fleets of the famous Onassis, Niarchos and Lemos families. In recognition of his achievements Pao was made an Honorary Doctor of Law by the Hong Kong University in 1975, and in 1976 appeared on the front cover of Newsweek magazine with the heading "King of the Sea". Pao received the Golden Plate Award of the American Academy of Achievement in 1977. He was knighted in 1978.

=== Diversification ===
1978 saw the start of a severe downturn in the shipping business. Pao and his managers were quick to spot the problem and commenced a programme to reduce the fleet, especially crude oil carriers, selling ships as they came off charter. 140 ships were sold and the fleet reduced by half over a period of 4 to 5 years allowing debt to be paid off and cash resources built up. Although this was a difficult time for World-Wide, the company, through early action and conservative financial management, was able to ride the recession with little of the problems seen elsewhere in the industry.

In the mid-1970s Pao had bought from Li Ka-shing a 10% holding in the Hong Kong and Kowloon Wharf and Godown Co. Ltd. (now The Wharf (Holdings)) and by 1977 had built this to 30%. Wharf had historically been in the Jardine Matheson sphere of influence. Friction with the Jardine camp broke out in the late 1970s over board appointments which concluded with the Pao camp being allowed two more directorships (making 4 out of a total 12). Hostilities broke out again in June 1980 with Jardines launching a cash and shares bid for Wharf. Although in Europe at the time, Pao and his team were able rapidly to put together a successful cash tender for shares to take his holding to 49% and securing control of Wharf. Pao then took over the roles of chairman and Chief Executive. Wharf gave World-Wide exposure to prime Kowloon waterfront property as well as ownership of Hong Kong Tramway and the Star Ferry.

During the 1980s, Pao became a strong supporter of China's modernisation efforts. He frequently was invited to Beijing by Deng Xiaoping to consult on matters related to the development of China's shipping industry.

In 1985, Pao was able to take control of Wheelock Marden, one of Hong Kong's premier companies established in 1857, when John Cheung sold his 34% stake to Pao for HK$2.5 billion forming a core shareholding from which to launch a bid in opposition to the bid from Tan Sri Khoo Teck Puat who had bought John Marden's 34% stake in the company. Wheelock gave World-Wide exposure to more prime central Hong Kong property as well as the Lane Crawford department store.

=== Retirement and other activities ===
In 1986, Pao retired from day-to-day management of the group handing over the shipping business to his son-in-law Helmut Sohmen and the Wheelock / Wharf interests to Peter Woo, another son-in-law. By 1989 he announced that he had given up his interests in the Trusts that held the Pao family assets (the shipping interests going to the Sohmen family and the Wheelock / Wharf interests going to the Woo family) and gave up his title as Honorary Chairman of World International. He had already retired from his directorship of the Hongkong and Shanghai Banking Corporation in 1983 when he hit the mandatory retirement age of 65 but continued to lead a very active life taking in advisory roles (formal and informal) and philanthropic activities. Over the years, Pao was on a number of corporate advisory committees including Chase Manhattan Bank, Industrial Bank of Japan, AT&T, United Technologies Corporation and Caterpillar Inc.

Pao was active in philanthropic works and was particularly interested in educational projects. Among notable gifts were US$20m to found Ningbo University, a £14m contribution to the Sino-British Friendship Scholarship scheme to enable Chinese students to attend British Universities and a US$10m gift to build a library at Shanghai Jiao Tong University.

== Personal life, death, and legacy ==
Pao had 4 daughters. On 23 September 1991, Pao died in Hong Kong at age 72. His son-in-law Peter Woo became the patriarch of Pao's business empire.

YK Pao School in Shanghai and YK Pao School Hong Kong, both under the YK Pao Education Foundation, were founded in memory of Pao. Yue-Kong Pao Hall at Purdue University, Pao Yue-kong Library at the Hong Kong Polytechnic University, Sir Yue-Kong Pao Hall at Chinese International School, and Pao Yue Kong Swimming Pool in Wong Chuk Hang, Hong Kong, were named in his honour.

== Sources ==
- Hutcheon, Robin (1990). First Sea Lord. Hong Kong: Chinese University Press. ISBN 962-201-454-2.
