= Golar Spirit =

Liquefied natural gas storage ship

History
- Name: Golar Spirit
- Owner: Sovereign Spirit Limited, a subsidiary of Golar LNG
- Port of registry: Marshall Islands, Majuro
- Ordered: 1973
- Builder: Kawasaki Heavy Industries
- Yard number: 107920
- Launched: 30 June 1977
- Completed: 1981
- Identification: Call sign: V7HA4; DNV ID: 09639; IMO number: 7373327
- Status: Laid-Up in Elefsina, Greece

General characteristics
- Class & type: 1A1 Tanker for Liquefied Gas REGAS-2 E0
- Tonnage: 106,577 long tons (119,366 short tons)
- Length: 289.01 m (948 ft 2 in)
- Beam: 44.61 m (146 ft 4 in)
- Draught: 12.524 m (41 ft 1.1 in)
- Speed: 19.5 knots (22.4 mph; 36.1 km/h)
- Capacity: 7,000,000 m^{3}/d (250,000,000 cu ft/d) (regasification); 128,998 m^{3} (4,555,500 cu ft) (storage (LNG))

Golar Spirit is a floating storage and regasification unit (FSRU). It is the world's first FSRU converted from a liquefied natural gas (LNG) carrier.

== History ==
Golar Spirit was built by the Kawasaki Shipbuilding Corporation in 1981 as an LNG carrier. It was the first Japan-built and first Asia-built LNG carrier. In 1986, Golar Spirit was chartered for twenty years by Indonesian oil and gas company Pertamina. It served the line delivering LNG from Indonesia to South Korea.

In April 2007, Golar Spirit was charter contracted by Petrobras to serve as the Pecém LNG terminal. The conversion started in October 2007 at the Keppel Shipyard in Singapore. The conversion was completed in mid-2008 and Golar Spirit headed to Brazil on 11 June 2008. On her course, the Golar Spirit transported a LNG load from Trinidad and Tobago to Brazil. She arrived in Pecém on 22 July 2008.

On 30 January 2009, Golar Spirit became the first vessel of this kind, which regasified LNG aboard.

== Technical description ==
The FSRU Golar Spirit operates at a jetty to which it is moored. LNG is transported to the FSRU by LNG carriers, that berth to the other side of the jetty. The LNG is vaporized in the onboard regasification system, which enables the FSRU to provide natural gas to the onshore consumers (power plants). It is a steel mono hull with LNG tanks arranged in the middle, with the re-gasification plant in the forward section and crew facilities with control room and utility machinery in the aft section. The engineering of the regasification system and the tanks were provided by Moss Maritime of Norway. The Norwegian company Bjørge engineered its pressure protection system through its subsidiary Solberg & Andersen.

Golar Spirit is equipped with a regasification system comprising high pressure LNG pumps, cryogenic LNG vaporizers and associated valves, piping and instrumentation. LNG pumps are provided by Shinko, while LNG vaporizers are provided by Thermax. The vaporizers use steam generated by the onboard existing steam boilers. The design pressure of the vaporizers exceeds 85 bars (8,500 kPa). Each vaporiser with wall thickness of over 55 millimeters (2.2 in) is over 8 meters (26 ft) long and weighs in excess of 5.5 metric tons (6.1 short tons). The regasification capacity of the Golar Spirit is 7 million cubic meters per day (250×10^{6} cu ft/d) (over 240 metric tons or 260 short tons of LNG per hour), and its storage capacity is 129 thousand cubic meters (4.6×10^{6} cu ft) of LNG, equivalent to 77 million cubic meters (2.7×10^{9} cu ft) of natural gas.

Det Norske Veritas has issued a Statement of Approval of the Regasification Plant and Interim Class Certificate confirming the REGAS-2 Class notation.

== Ownership ==
Golar Spirit was initially owned by Golar LNG. It was charter contracted by Petrobras for ten years starting from the second half of 2008 however, it announced in December 2016 that it would terminate the contract early on June 21, 2017. Golar Spirit has been in layup since. Its peer vessel, Golar Freeze, was moved to Brazil in 2019. A 2020 report by Golar LNG claimed that it would cost $10 million to reactivate the vessel.

The vessel was sold to New Fortress Energy and renamed FSRU Spirit and offered for charter following the Ukraine conflict's impact on gas pipelines.
