= Guy Sayer =

Guy Mowbray Sayer, CBE, JP (18 June 1924 – 14 April 2009) was the chief manager of the Hongkong and Shanghai Banking Corporation from 1972 to 1977, and an unofficial member of the Legislative and Executive Councils of Hong Kong.

Business positions
Preceded by Jake Saunders	Chief Manager of the Hongkong and Shanghai Banking Corporation; 1972–1977	Succeeded by Michael Sandberg
