= Celina Midelfart =

Norwegian businesswoman (born 1973)

- Born: February 1973 (age 53)
- Education: London School of Economics, New York University Stern School of Business
- Occupations: Businesswoman, investor
- Children: 1

Celina Midelfart (born February 1973) is a Norwegian cosmetics heiress and businesswoman. In 1995, she took over the running of the family's health and beauty care business, Midelfart AS. She became publicly known in the 1990s as the first love interest of Norway's then Crown Prince Haakon in 1993.

== Family ==
A member of the Midelfart family, she was born in Oslo as a daughter of the businessman Finn-Erik Midelfart (1943–95) and Hermine Kristin née Muhle (born 1944).

== Education ==
After finishing her secondary education at Oslo Cathedral School she studied in France from 1994 to 1996, at London School of Economics from 1994 to 1996, before transferring to New York University Stern School of Business, graduating with a Bachelor of Science summa cum laude in Finance in 1998.

== Career ==
Midelfart is a private investor, owner and executive chairman of Midelfart Capital AS. In her early career she was the third generation CEO of the family business Midelfart AS. She was previously a partner at Magnipartners Ltd, working actively in the offshore drilling and LNG space. Since 2015, she has held larger shareholding positions in various listed offshore oil, service and supply companies. She is currently a board member and 10% owner of the Swedish Consumer Finance Bank, Avida AB, member of the Board of Trustees at Oslo International School and member of the Board of SEA 1 Offshore. She previously served on the board of the world largest fish farming company, Mowi AS, and the Swedish health and beauty care company, Midsona AB. Midelfart is a Norwegian citizen.

== Personal life ==
In the early 1990s she came to national prominence as the girlfriend of Norway's then Crown Prince Haakon.

She was in a relationship with businessman Tor Olav Trøim in 2009, and the couple had their first child, Olav, while they were living in London in 2011. The couple separated, and she and her son currently live in Oslo.
