= Midelfart family =

Norwegian patrician family

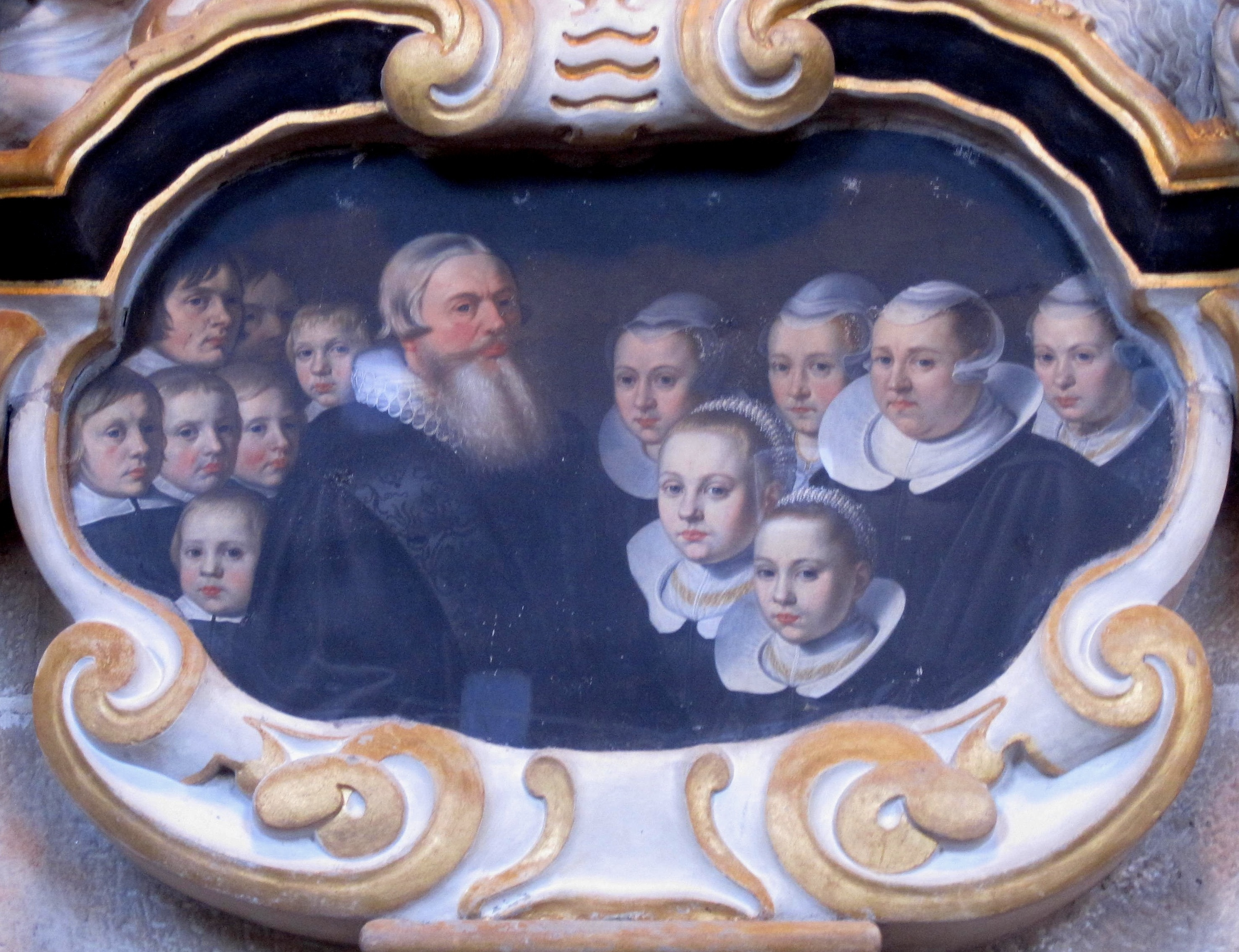
Mads Jensen Medelfar (1579–1637) with his family. He was from Middelfart in Denmark and became Bishop of Lund

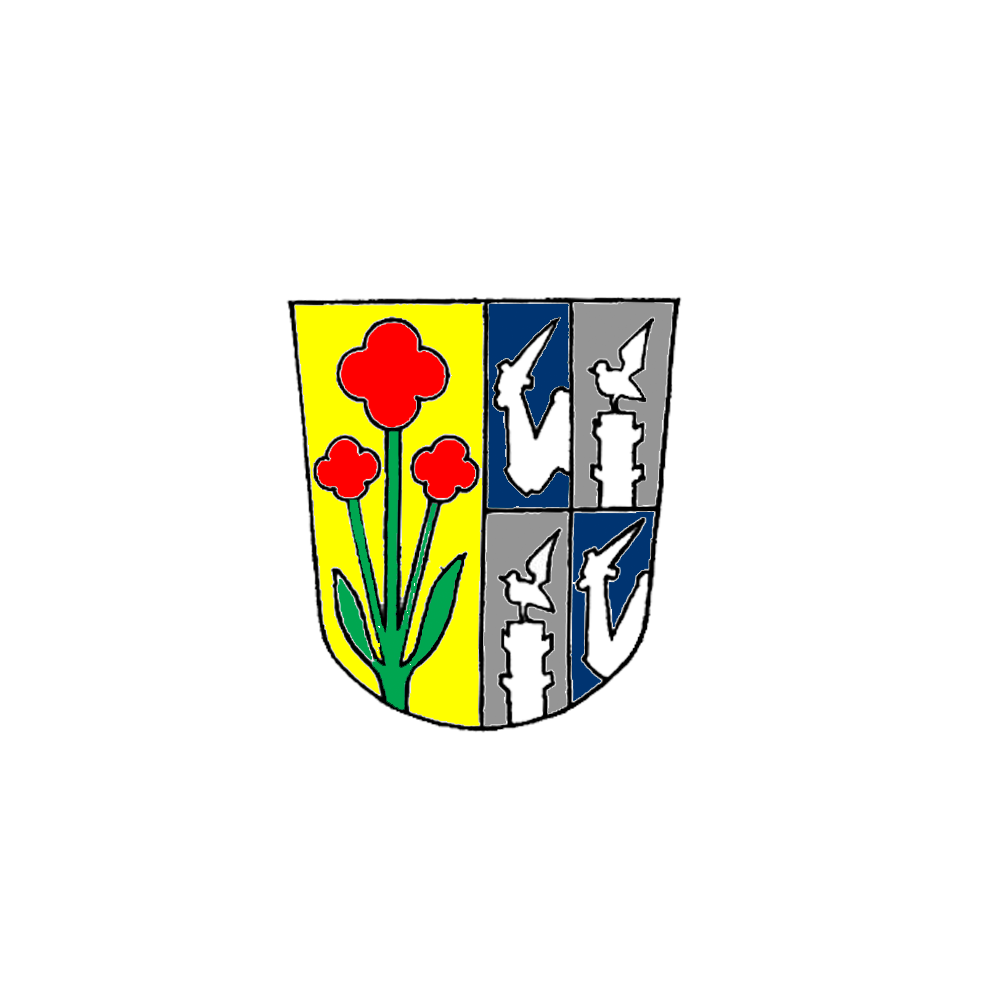
Shield of the Midelfart coat of arms

The Midelfart family is a Norwegian patrician family of Danish origin.

The name is derived from the town of Middelfart on the island of Funen in Denmark. Its meaning is "middle way" (or more literally, "Middlefare"); it consists of the old Danish word mæthal meaning "middle" and far meaning "way," "passage" or "journey". The name originally referred to the strait Snævringen ("the narrowing"), which is the narrowest part of the Little Belt, and was subsequently applied to the settlement as well.

Niels Christensen Midelfart (died 1683) became a burgher in Trondheim. His great-grandson was the priest Hans Christian Ulrik Midelfart, a member of the 1814 Norwegian Constituent Assembly. Today the family is known for its business activities, particularly the former cosmetics group Midelfart & Co., founded in 1923. A famous member of the family is the businesswoman Celina Midelfart, briefly girlfriend of the future Haakon VIII in 1993.
