= Tove Kvammen Midelfart =

Norwegian lawyer and businesswoman

Tove Elisabeth Kvammen Midelfart (born 2 August 1951) is a Norwegian lawyer and businesswoman. Following the death in 1995 of her husband, Finn-Erik Midelfart, she inherited a large share of the assets of his cosmetics company Midelfart & Co. In addition, succeeding in her husband's position, she was appointed honorary consul for Monaco in Oslo by her friend Prince Rainier. Midelfart has also served on the boards of companies including Midsona Norge and Narvesen ASA.

In view of her ownership of a country house on the little island of Furuholmen in Oslofjord, Midelfart is also known as the Queen of Oslofjord (Oslofjordens dronning). She purchased the island in 1998 for some NOK 15 million but it was subsequently valued as being worth far more.

In 2015, Midelfart was estimated to be one of Norway's richest women with a capital of over NOK 240 million.
