= Bjørge =

Norwegian engineering company

Bjørge ASA
- Company type: Public (OSE: BJORGE)
- Industry: Engineering
- Founded: 1977
- Headquarters: Tananger, Norway
- Area served: Global
- Key people: Steinar Aasland (CEO); Svein Sivertsen (Chairman)
- Revenue: NOK 838 million (2006)
- Operating income: NOK 41 million (2006)
- Website: http://www.bjorge.no

Bjørge is an onshore and offshore oil and gas and Marine software engineering and maintenance company. The company is based in Tananger outside Stavanger, Norway.

== History ==
The company was founded in 1977 as a joint venture between Bjørge Enterprise and ETPM (now part of Acergy) to perform offshore maintenance services. In 1995 it was bought by Strand Enterprises, but listed on the Oslo Stock Exchange in 1997. In 1998 the company bought Norcoat Services from Halliburton and Steinco in 2000. The same year Bjørge merged with Solberg & Andersen. 2001 saw the purchase of Scana Moland from Scana in 2004 Eptec was bought. The same year Bjørge chose to leave the MMO business that was heavily dominated by Aker Kværner and Vetco Aibel.

On 20 September 2010 the company announced a plan to spin off its process, fire and safety solutions division into a new company.
