= H.J. Shen =

H. J. Shen (Shen Hsi-Jui)
- 沈熙瑞
- Born: May 8, 1905; Shanghai, China
- Died: February 24, 1996 (aged 90); San Francisco, California, United States
- Occupation(s): Banker and industrialist

Hsi-Jui Shen (May 8, 1905 – February 24, 1996) was the former head of the central bank of China, and chief manager for the banking conglomerate HSBC (appointed in 1964). Shen was also among the first students of Chinese descent at Dartmouth College (class of 1927) and Tuck School of Business (class of 1928). He had four children; David Shen, Dora Hsia, Douglas Shen, and Frank Shen.

== Bibliography ==
- Solinger, D. (1991). From Lathes to Looms: China's Industrial Policy in Comparative Perspective: 1978–1992: Stanford University Press.
