= Morten Bergesen =

Norwegian rower

Personal information
- Full name: Morten Sigval Bergesen
- Nationality: Norwegian
- Born: 9 June 1974 (age 52) Stavanger, Norway

Sport
- Sport: Rowing

Morten Sigval Bergesen (born 9 June 1974) is a Norwegian rower. He competed in the men's coxless four event at the 1996 Summer Olympics.
