= Exmar Shipmanagement =

EXMAR Ship Management is a Belgian registered maritime company. It was established in 1991 as part of the shipping activities of the Compagnie Maritime Belge group. Compagnie Maritime Belge was established in 1895 as a diversified shipping group with its headquarters in Antwerp, Belgium. When the CMB shareholders decided on the de-merger of the company by spinning off its Gas Transport Business into a new Belgian listed public limited liability company, EXMAR Shipmanagement NV became a full affiliate of Exmar NV.

== Services ==
The ship management company of the EXMAR Group offers ship management services to the maritime industry. These services include:

- Crewing services: ESM employs 387 Senior Officers, 598 Junior Officers, 700 A/B seamen and 127 Offshore employees to operate LNG and LNGRV carriers, LPG carriers, Floating Storage and Regasification Units, Floating Liquefaction Units and Offshore Accommodation Barges. Company activities include:
- Technical Superintendence & HSEQ management
- Technical, marine & IT consultancy services:
  - Pre-purchase inspections, building supervision & commissioning of vessels under construction
  - HSEQ management: implementation, maintenance, training and audits
  - Port Facility Security management: assessment of security threats, security plans, training & drills, audits
  - IT: implementation of on board planned maintenance systems.

EXMAR Ship Management specializes in managing the following vessel/barge types:

- VLGC LPG carriers
- Midsize LPG carriers
- LNG and LNGRV carriers
- Fully pressurized LPG carriers
- Semi-pressurized Gas carriers
- Floating Storage & Regasification Units
- Offshore units (FPSOs, accommodation barges)
- Floating Liquefaction Units

=== Overview ===
EXMAR Ship Management has been involved in the management of LNG and LPG vessels since the early 1980s, as the primary ship manager of EXMAR NV, as well as other owners such as Avance. Exmar NV is supervising an LPG carrier new building program and a refit of its LNG fleet to accommodate Regas operations on a number of its LNG Gas Carriers. EXMAR Ship Management Superintendents are typically former serving Officers who manage vessels from NB spec review to full operations. Similarly, the experience gained in assisting the owner during pre-delivery and the first months of operation (first outfit, guarantee items, etc.) are utilized for the subsequent technical superintendence of the vessel. The company's Marine Department manages all aspects of vessel conformance with the relevant ISO, OHSAS and TMSA standards. Training programs have been set up with the Antwerp Maritime Academy and other Institutes for in-depth training with the STCW and ARPA, BRM, GMDSS and full mission Bridge simulators.

== Fleet ==
=== FSRU ===
The FRSU Toscana is co-managed and operated by EXMAR Ship Management and Fratelli Cosulich through the joint venture EXMAR Cosulich Offshore Services

Vessel	Capacity m^{3}	Year built	Yard	Owner	Type	Operated since
FSRU Toscana	79.984	2012	Drydocks World	OLT	FSRU	01/02/2012

=== LPG/NH3 cargo ===
EXMAR Ship Management currently manages and operates the following VLGC's, midsize, semi-refrigerated and fully pressurized gas carriers:

Vessel	Capacity m^{3}	Year built	Yard	Owner	Type	Operated since
ANGELA	3.540	2009	Yamanishi	Fertility Devpt Co Ltd/Wah Kwong	Pressurised	20/10/2006
AVANCE	83.000	2002	Kawasaki HI	Avance Gas	VLGC	05/04/2005
BASTOGNE	35.229	2002	Hyundai HI	Exmar/Teekay	Midsize	21/09/2011
BRUGGE VENTURE	35.418	1997	Mitsubishi HI	EXMAR/Teekay	Midsize	21/04/2013
BRUSSELS	35.454	1997	Mitsubishi HI	EXMAR/Teekay	Midsize	04/05/2005
COURCHEVILLE	28.006	1989	Boelwerf	EXMAR/Teekay	Midsize	01/08/1996
ELISABETH	3.452	2009	Yamanishi	Laurel Carriers Inc/Wah Kwong	Pressurised	15/10/2012
EUPEN	38.961	1999	Mitsubishi HI	EXMAR/Teekay	Midsize	14/12/2002
JOAN	3.540	2007	Yamanishi	Universal Crown Ltd/Wah Kwong	Pressurised	06/07/2009
LIBRAMONT	38.445	2006	DSME	EXMAR/Teekay	Midsize	16/05/2006
MAGDALENA	3.541	2008	Yamanishi	Hallsworth Marine/Wah Kwong	Pressurised	09/05/2012
MARIANNE	3.539	2008	Yamanishi	Croxford Ltd/Wah Kwong	Pressurised	09/09/2009
TEMSE	12.030	1995	Boelwerf	EXMAR/Teekay	Semi-refrigerated	01/09/1995
TOURAINE	39.270	1996	Hitachi Zosen	EXMAR/Teekay	Midsize	12/05/2003
WAASMUNSTER	38.115	2013	Hyundai Mipo	EXMAR/Teekay	Midsize	01/04/2014
WAREGEM	38.115	2014	Hyundai Mipo	EXMAR	Midsize	25/09/2014
WARINSART	38.115	2013	Hyundai Mipo	EXMAR/Teekay	Midsize	06/06/2014

=== Offshore ===
EXMAR Ship Management is responsible for the technical operations of the following four offshore units:

- Farwah: 35,000 bbl/d (5,600 m^{3}/d), 900,000 bbl (140,000 m^{3}) storage FPSO
- Kissama: Offshore service non-propelled accommodation barge for 220 people
- Nunce: Offshore service non-propelled accommodation barge for 350/450 people
- Otto 5: Offshore service non-propelled accommodation barge for 300 people.

In addition to servicing owned tonnage, Exmar (Exmar Offshore Services) provides operational support to third party FPSO projects in West and North Africa and Italy.
