= Microturbine =

25-500-kW internal combustion engine, typically Brayton cycle-type

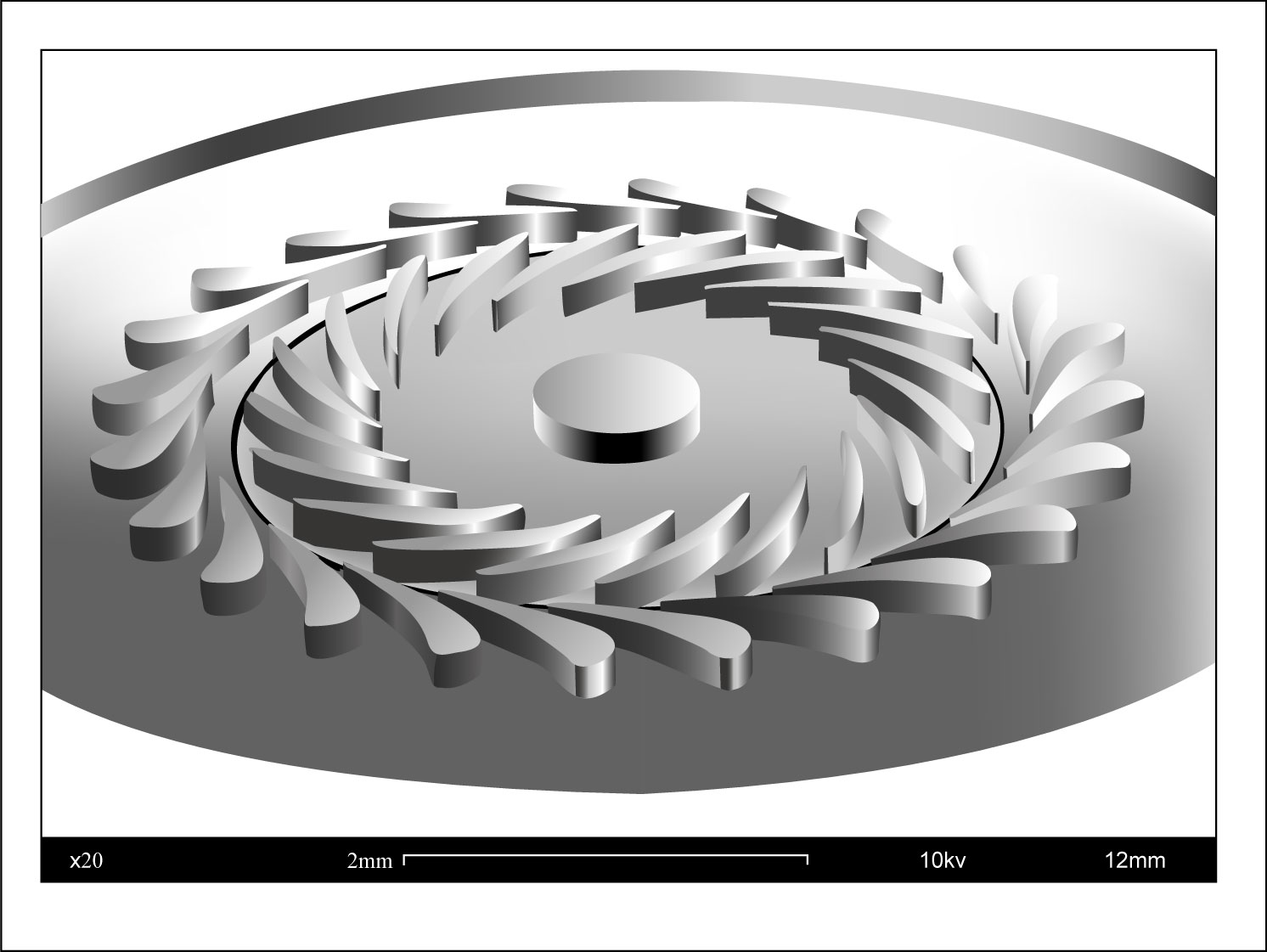
Close-up view of a microturbine.

A microturbine (MT) is a small gas turbine with similar cycles and components to a heavy gas turbine. The MT power-to-weight ratio is better than a heavy gas turbine because the reduction of turbine diameters causes an increase in shaft rotational speed. Heavy gas-turbine generators are too large and too expensive for distributed power applications, so MTs are developed for small-scale power like electrical power generation alone or as combined cooling, heating, and power (CCHP) systems. MTs typically produce 25 to 250 kW (34 to 335 hp) and are evolved from piston-engine turbochargers, aircraft auxiliary power units (APU), or small jet engines, the size of a refrigerator. Early turbines of 30–70 kW (40–94 hp) grew to 200–250 kW (270–340 hp).

== Design ==
Cutaway of a recuperated microturbine

An MT consists of a compressor, combustor, impeller/turbine, and electric generator on a single shaft or two.It can have a recuperator capturing waste heat to improve the compressor efficiency, an intercooler, and reheat. Typical MTs rotate at over 40,000 RPM, and a common single-shaft microturbine usually rotates at 90,000 to 120,000 RPM. They often have single-stage radial compressors and single-stage radial turbines. Recuperators are difficult to design and manufacture because they operate under high pressure and temperature differentials.

Advances in electronics allow unattended operation, and electronic power-switching technology eliminates the need for the generator to be synchronised with the power grid, allowing it to be integrated with the turbine shaft and to double as the starter motor.

Gas turbines accept most commercial fuels, such as petrol, natural gas, propane, diesel fuel, and kerosene as well as renewable fuels such as E85, biodiesel, and biogas. Starting on kerosene or diesel can require a more volatile product such as propane gas.

Microturbines can use micro-combustion.

Full-size gas turbines often use ball bearings; however, the 1,000 °C (1,270 K; 1,830 °F) temperatures and high speeds of microturbines make oil lubrication and ball bearings impractical—they require air bearings or possibly magnetic bearings. They may be designed with foil bearings and air-cooling operating without lubricating oil, coolants, or other hazardous materials.

To maximize part-load efficiency, multiple turbines can be started or stopped as needed in an integrated system. Reciprocating engines can react quickly to power-requirement changes while microturbines lose more efficiency at low power levels. They can have a higher power-to-weight ratio than piston engines, low emissions, and as little as one moving part. Reciprocating engines can be more efficient and cheaper overall, and typically use simple journal bearings lubricated by motor oil.

Microturbines can be used for cogeneration and distributed generation as turbo alternators or turbogenerators, or to power hybrid electric vehicles. The majority of the waste heat is contained in the relatively high-temperature exhaust, making it simpler to capture, while a reciprocating engine's waste heat is split between its exhaust and cooling system. Exhaust heat can be used for water heating, space heating, drying processes, or absorption chillers, which create cold for air conditioning from heat energy instead of electric energy.

=== Efficiency ===
Microturbines have around 15% efficiencies without a recuperator, or 20–30% with one, and they can reach 85% combined thermal-electrical efficiency in cogeneration. The recuperated Niigata Power Systems 300 kW (400 hp) RGT3R thermal efficiency reaches 32.5%, while the 360 kW (480 hp) non recuperated RGT3C is at 16.3%. Capstone Turbine claims a 33% LHV Electrical Efficiency for its 200 kW (270 hp) C200S.

In 1988, the NEDO started the Ceramic Gas Turbine project within the Japanese New Sunshine Project: in 1999 the recuperated twin-shaft 311.6 kW (417.9 hp) Kawasaki Heavy Industries CGT302 achieved a 42.1% efficiency and a 1,350 °C (1,620 K; 2,460 °F) turbine inlet temperature. In October 2010, Capstone was awarded by the US Department of Energy the design of a two-stage intercooled microturbine derived from its current 200 kW (270 hp) and 65 kW (87 hp) engines for a 370 kW (500 hp) turbine targeting a 42% electrical efficiency. Researchers from the Lappeenranta University of Technology designed a 400 kW (540 hp) intercooled and recuperated two-shaft microturbine with an efficiency of 40.2%, resulting in the formation of Aurelia Technologies LLC and the ultimate commercialization of the A400 small gas turbine.

== Market ==
Forecast international predicts a 51.4% market share for Capstone Turbine by unit production from 2008 to 2032, followed by Bladon Jets with 19.4%, MTT with 13.6%, FlexEnergy with 10.9%, and Ansaldo Energia with 4.5%.

== Ultra micro ==
MIT started its millimeter-size turbine engine project in the middle of the 1990s when Professor of Aeronautics and Astronautics Alan H. Epstein considered the possibility of creating a personal turbine which will be able to meet all the demands of a modern person's electrical needs, just as a large turbine can meet the electricity demands of a small city. Problems have occurred with heat dissipation and high-speed bearings in these new microturbines. Moreover, their expected efficiency is a very low, at 5–6%. According to Professor Epstein, current commercial Li-ion rechargeable batteries deliver about 120–150 Wh/kg (200–240 kJ/lb). MIT's millimeter-size turbine will deliver 500–700 Wh/kg (820–1,140 kJ/lb) in the near term, rising to 1,200–1,500 Wh/kg (2,000–2,400 kJ/lb) in the longer term.

A similar microturbine built by the Belgian Katholieke Universiteit Leuven has a rotor diameter of 20 mm and is expected to produce about 1,000 W (1.3 hp).

== Aircraft ==
Safran-backed French startup Turbotech is developing a 73 kW (98 shp) turboprop with a recuperator to improve efficiency from 10 to 30%, for a brake specific fuel consumption similar to a piston engine, but 30 kg (66 lb) lighter at 55 kg (121 lb) and without cooling drag. Direct operating costs, Turbotech says, should be reduced by 30% due to more diverse fuels and lower maintenance with a doubled time between overhaul at 4,000 h. Targeted for high-end ultralight two-seaters and unmanned aircraft, it will be slightly more expensive than a competing Rotax 912 but should be as competitive over its life cycle. For a VTOL two-seater, a 55 kW (74 hp) turbogenerator would weigh 85 kg (187 lb) with fuel for 2.5 h of endurance instead of 1 ton of batteries. A demonstrator ran in 2016–17 and ground-testing began in the second half of 2018 before flight-testing in the second half of 2019 and first delivery in the first half of 2020. The final assembly line was created in Toussus-le-Noble Airport near Paris, for a 1,000-engine annual output by 2025. A 30% efficiency is equivalent to a 281 g/kWh fuel consumption with a 42.7 MJ/kg fuel. The 64 kg (141 lb) TP-R90 turboprop or TG-R90 turbogenerator can output 90 kW (120 hp) and burns 18–25 L (4.8–6.6 US gal) of jet fuel per hour in cruise.

Czech PBS Velká Bíteš offers its 180 kW (240 hp) TP100 turboprop weighing 61.6 kg (136 lb) for ultralights and UAVs, consuming 515 g/kWh (5.05 oz/MJ). This is equivalent to 16.4% efficiency with a 42.7 MJ/kg fuel.

Miami-based UAV Turbines developed its 40 hp (30 kW) Monarch RP (previously UTP50R) recuperated turboprop for around 1,320 lb (600 kg) gross weight aircraft, to be tested on a TigerShark UAV. On 10 December 2019, the company unveiled its Monarch Hybrid Range Extender, a 33 shp (25 kW) hybrid-electric demonstrator based on its Monarch 5 turbine unveiled in September, weighting 27 kg (60 lb) for the engine and 54 kg (119 lb) for the whole system.

== Hybrid vehicles ==
When used in extended range electric vehicles the static efficiency drawback is less important, since the gas turbine can be run at or near maximum power, driving an alternator to produce electricity either for the wheel motors, or for the batteries, as appropriate to speed and battery state. The batteries act as a "buffer" (energy storage) in delivering the required amount of power to the wheel motors, rendering throttle response of the gas turbine irrelevant.

There is, moreover, no need for a significant or variable-speed gearbox; turning an alternator at comparatively high speeds allows for a smaller and lighter alternator than would otherwise be the case. The superior power-to-weight ratio of the gas turbine and its fixed-speed gearbox allows for a much lighter prime mover than for the Toyota Prius (a 1.8-litre petrol engine) or the Chevrolet Volt (a 1.4-litre petrol engine). This in turn allows a heavier weight of batteries to be carried, which allows for a longer electric-only range. Alternatively, the vehicle can use heavier, cheaper lead–acid batteries or safer lithium iron phosphate battery.

In extended-range electric vehicles, like those planned by Land-Rover/Range-Rover in conjunction with Bladon, or by Jaguar also in partnership with Bladon, the very poor throttling response (their high moment of rotational inertia) does not matter, because the gas turbine, which may be spinning at 100,000 rpm, is not mechanically connected to the wheels. It was this poor throttling response that so bedeviled the 1950 Rover gas-turbine-powered prototype motor car, which did not have the advantage of an intermediate electric drive train to provide sudden power spikes when demanded by the driver.
