= Gas Vitality =

LNG bunkering vessel

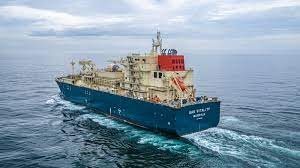

Class overview
- Operators: MOL
- In service: 2021–present

General characteristics
- Type: Bunkering tanker
- Tonnage: 17,640 GT
- Length: 135 m (442 ft 11 in)
- Beam: 25 m (82 ft 0 in)
- Draught: 16 m (52 ft 6 in)
- Propulsion: a dual-fuel diesel-electric
- Capacity: 23,000 TEU

Gas Vitality is the first and latest liquefied natural gas (LNG) bunkering vessel to be based in France. The vessel is the first in a series of two ships (Gas Agility) to constructed for Emerald Green Maritime at the Jiangnan facilities of Hudong Zhonghua Shipbuilding.

All three parties first collaborated in 2018 to design and build sister ship Gas Agility, which has operated at the Port of Rotterdam since November 2020. Gas Vitality was delivered at Hudong–Zhonghua Shipbuilding in China near Shanghai, on October 31, 2021, and chartered to TotalEnergies Marine Fuels and scheduled to enter operational service in December 2021 and be based in the Port of Marseille-Fos, to serve the Mediterranean region. Its first contracts will be to perform LNG bunkering services to Jacques Saadé-class LNG-fueled container ships and MSC Cruises upcoming LNG-powered cruise ships that call at the French port.

== List of ships ==
Ship	IMO number	Delivery	Status	Ref
Gas Vitality	9909285	31 Oct 2021	In service	
