= Methane Princess =

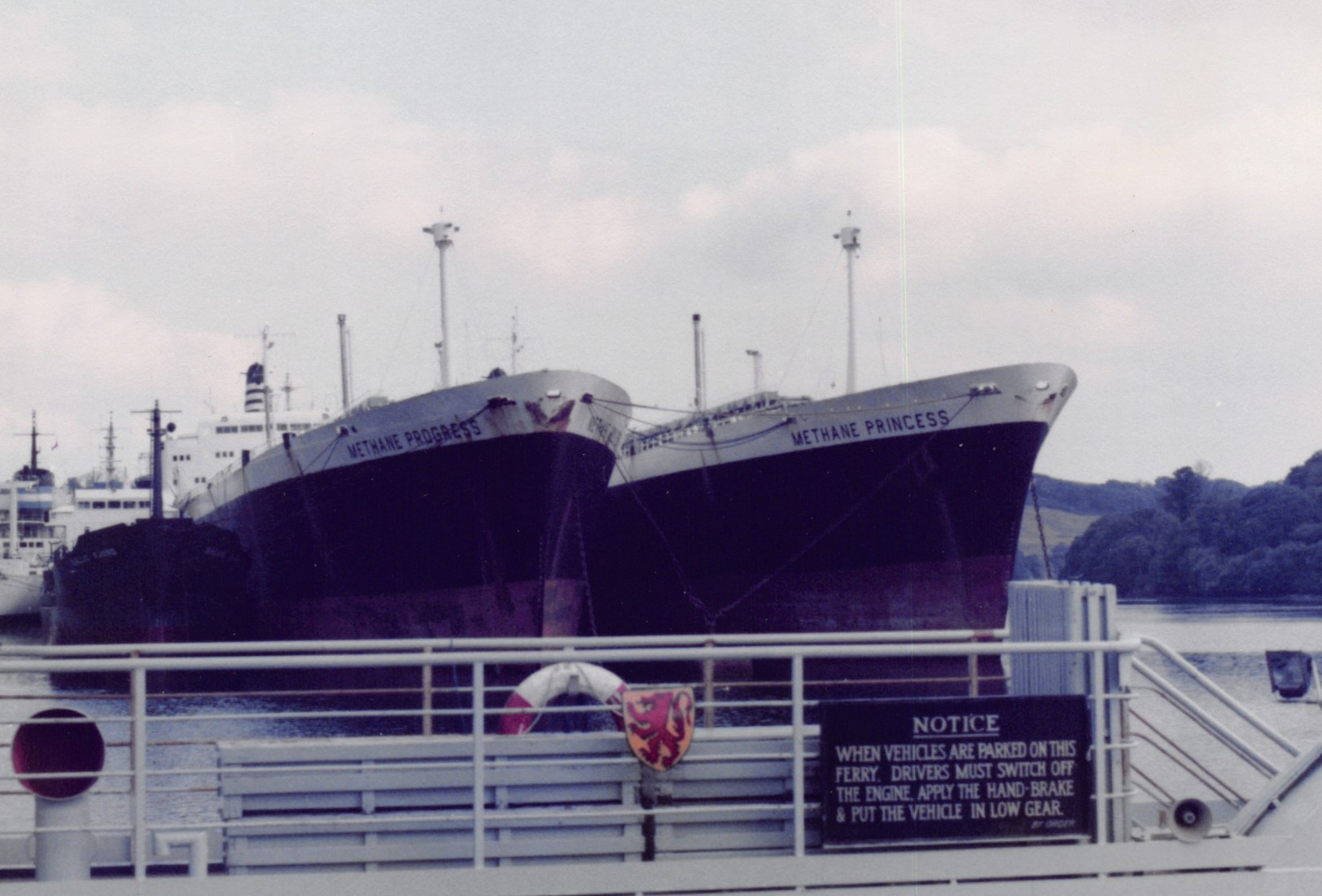
- Sister ships Methane Princess and Methane Progress

History
- Name: Methane Princess
- Owner: Shell Tankers U.K., Conch Methane
- Operator: British Gas
- Builder: Vickers
- Launched: 22 June 1963
- Completed: 21 June 1964
- Out of service: 1997
- Identification: IMO number: 5412583
- Fate: Scrapped 1997

General characteristics
- Class & type: LNG carrier
- Length: 621 ft (189 m)
- Beam: 82 ft (25 m)
- Installed power: 13,750 shp (10,250 kW)
- Propulsion: Steam
- Speed: 17.5 knots (32.4 km/h; 20.1 mph)
- Capacity: 1,220,000 cubic feet (35,000 m^{3}) methane

Methane Princess and Methane Progress were the first purpose-built LNG carriers, entering service in 1964 and used to transport natural gas from Algeria to the UK. Methane Princess was built at the Vickers shipyard at Barrow-in-Furness and her sister by Harland & Wolff in Belfast.

== Design and construction ==
In 1958 the tanker Methane Pioneer entered service, converted from a cargo ship for the sea transport of liquified natural gas (LNG), by a joint venture of Conoco and Union Stock Yards, funded by the British Gas Council, later joined by the Shell and renamed Conch International Methane. Following the successful proving of the technological and commercial viability by Methane Pioneer, two identical purpose-designed tankers were ordered by Conch to service a contract by British Gas to import LNG from Arzew, Algeria. One ship was ordered from Vickers-Armstrongs Shipbuilders at Barrow-in-Furness as Yard No.1071 and the other from Harland & Wolff in Belfast as Yard No.1653.

Both ships were 189.3 m (621 ft) long overall and 177.0 m (580.7 ft) between perpendiculars, with a beam of 24.9 m (82 ft), and measured 21876 gross registered tons. Their cargo volume capacity was 27,400 cubic metres (970,000 cu ft), divided between nine prismatic, or prism-shaped, tanks. Unlike the diesel-powered Methane Pioneer, the new ships were powered by a novel system with dual fuel steam turbines, utilising boil-off LNG from the cargo tanks as well as conventional fuel oil. The keel of Methane Princess was laid on 26 April 1962 and she was launched on 22 June 1963. The keel of Methane Progress was laid on 24 September 1962 and she was launched on 19 September 1963.

== Commercial operation ==
Although Methane Progress was completed first, on 26 May 1964, it was Methane Princess (completed 21 June) that took on the first load of natural gas at Arzew, Algeria when the liquefaction plant was opened on 27 September, and arrived at the Gas Council's terminal at Canvey island, Essex on 12 October. The two ships could transport 700,000 tons of liquified gas per year, then estimated as 10 per cent of Britain's gas consumption.

The import of LNG from Algeria to Canvey ceased in 1981.

Methane Progress was scrapped in 1986 at Castellón, Spain, but her sister not until 1997, at Alang, India.
