= Combustion chamber =

Part of an internal combustion engine or steam engine

A combustion chamber is part of an internal combustion engine in which the fuel/air mix is burned. For steam engines, the term has also been used for an extension of the firebox which is used to allow a more complete combustion process.

== Internal combustion engines ==
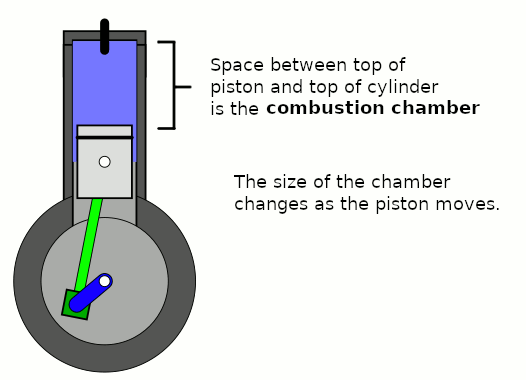
Side view of an engine, showing the combustion chamber's location

In an internal combustion engine, the pressure caused by the burning air/fuel mixture applies direct force to part of the engine (e.g. for a piston engine, the force is applied to the top of the piston), which converts the gas pressure into mechanical energy (often in the form of a rotating output shaft). This contrasts an external combustion engine, where the combustion takes place in a separate part of the engine to where the gas pressure is converted into mechanical energy.

=== Spark-ignition engines ===
In spark ignition engines, such as petrol (gasoline) engines, the combustion chamber is usually located in the cylinder head. The engines are often designed such that the bottom of combustion chamber is roughly in line with the top of the engine block.

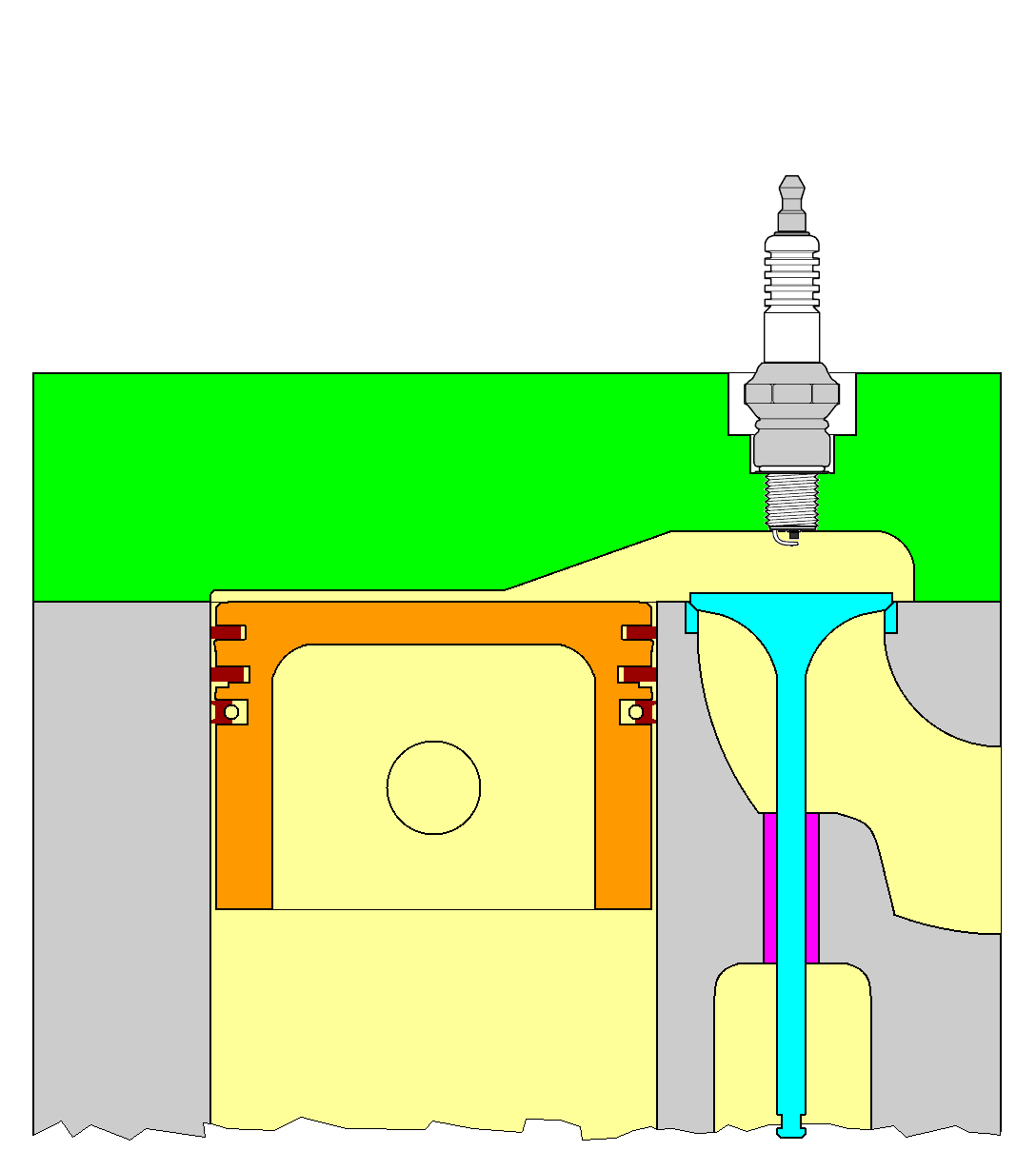
Flathead engine combustion chamber (shown in yellow), located above the piston (orange) and valve (blue)

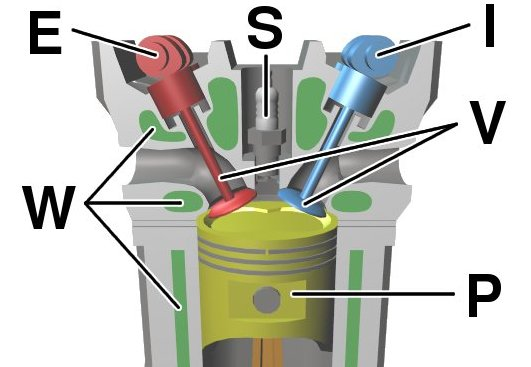
OHC engine combustion chamber, located between the piston (shown in yellow) and the valves (blue and red)

Modern engines with overhead valves or overhead camshaft(s) use the top of the piston (when it is near top dead centre) as the bottom of the combustion chamber. Above this, the sides and roof of the combustion chamber include the intake valves, exhaust valves and spark plug. This forms a relatively compact combustion chamber without any protrusions to the side (i.e. all of the chamber is located directly above the piston). Common shapes for the combustion chamber are typically similar to one or more half-spheres (such as the hemi, pent-roof, wedge or kidney-shaped chambers).

The older flathead engine design uses a "bathtub"-shaped combustion chamber, with an elongated shape that sits above both the piston and the valves (which are located beside the piston). IOE engines combine elements of overhead valve and flathead engines; the intake valve is located above the combustion chamber, while the exhaust valve is located below it.

The shape of the combustion chamber, intake ports and exhaust ports are key to achieving efficient combustion and maximising power output. Cylinder heads are often designed to achieve a certain "swirl" pattern (rotational component to the gas flow) and turbulence, which improves the mixing and increases the flow rate of gasses. The shape of the piston top also affects the amount of swirl.

Another design feature to promote turbulence for good fuel/air mixing is squish, where the fuel/air mix is "squished" at high pressure by the rising piston.

The location of the spark plug is also an important factor, since this is the starting point of the flame front (the leading edge of the burning gasses) which then travels downwards towards the piston. Good design should avoid narrow crevices where stagnant "end gas" can become trapped, reducing the power output of the engine and potentially leading to engine knocking. Most engines use a single spark plug per cylinder, however some (such as the 1986-2009 Alfa Romeo Twin Spark engine) use two spark plugs per cylinder.

=== Compression-ignition engines ===
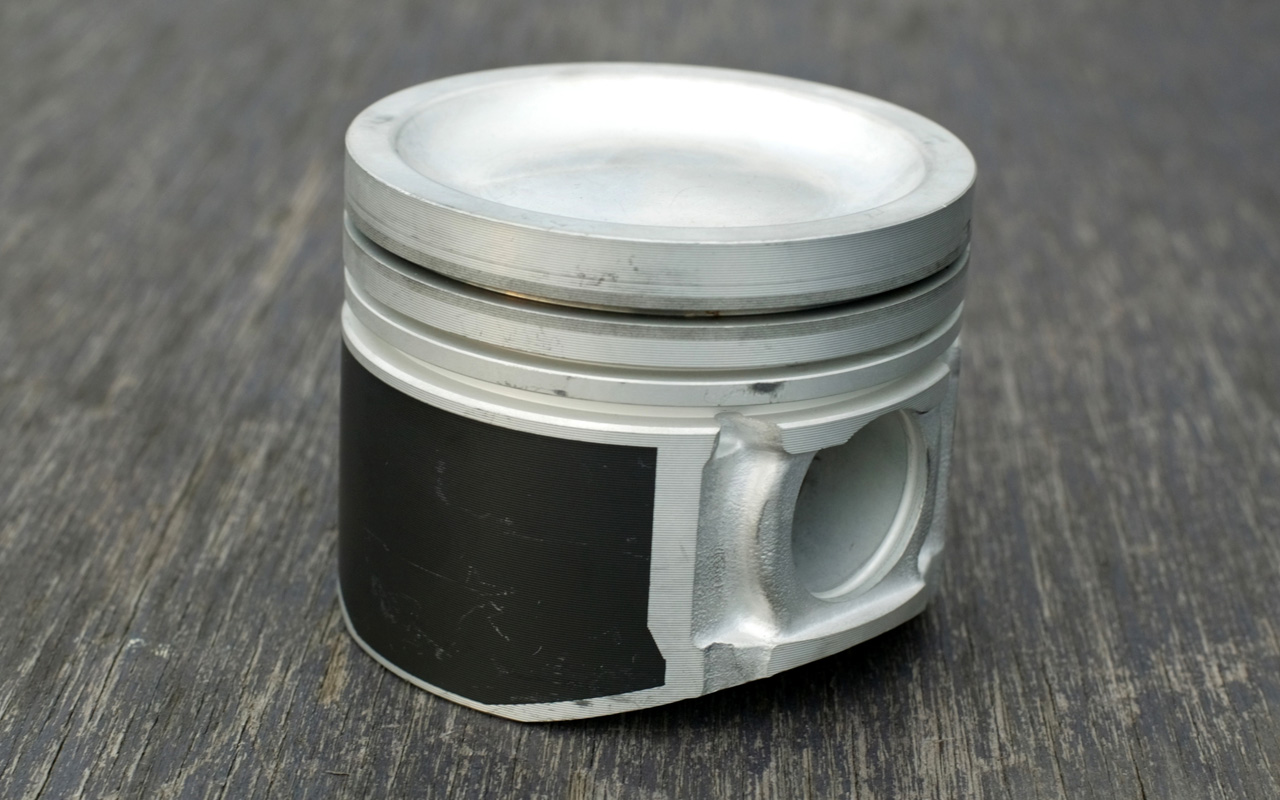
Dished piston for a diesel engine

Compression-ignition engines, such as diesel engines, are typically classified as either:

- Direct injection, where the fuel is injected into the combustion chamber. Common varieties include unit direct injection and common rail injection.
- Indirect injection, where the fuel is injected into a swirl chamber or pre-combustion chamber. The fuel ignites as it is injected into this chamber and the burning air/fuel mixture spreads into the main combustion chamber.

Direct injection engines usually give better fuel economy but indirect injection engines can use a lower grade of fuel.

Harry Ricardo was prominent in developing combustion chambers for diesel engines, the best known being the Ricardo Comet.

=== Gas turbine ===
In a continuous flow system, for example a jet engine combustor, the pressure is controlled and the combustion creates an increase in volume. The combustion chamber in gas turbines and jet engines (including ramjets and scramjets) is called the combustor.

The combustor is fed with high pressure air by the compression system, adds fuel and burns the mix and feeds the hot, high pressure exhaust into the turbine components of the engine or out the exhaust nozzle.

Different types of combustors exist, mainly:

- Can type: Can combustors are self-contained cylindrical combustion chambers. Each "can" has its own fuel injector, liner, interconnectors, casing. Each "can" get an air source from individual opening.
- Cannular type: Like the can type combustor, can annular combustors have discrete combustion zones contained in separate liners with their own fuel injectors. Unlike the can combustor, all the combustion zones share a common air casing.
- Annular type: Annular combustors do away with the separate combustion zones and simply have a continuous liner and casing in a ring (the annulus).

=== Rocket engine ===
If the gas velocity changes, thrust is produced, such as in the nozzle of a rocket engine.

== Steam engines ==
Considering the definition of combustion chamber used for internal combustion engines, the equivalent part of a steam engine would be the firebox, since this is where the fuel is burned. However, in the context of a steam engine, the term "combustion chamber" has also been used for a specific area between the firebox and the boiler. This extension of the firebox is designed to allow a more complete combustion of the fuel, improving fuel efficiency and reducing build-up of soot and scale. The use of this type of combustion chamber is large steam locomotive engines, allows the use of shorter firetubes.

== Micro combustion chambers ==
Micro combustion chambers are the devices in which combustion happens at a very small volume, due to which surface to volume ratio increases which plays a vital role in stabilizing the flame.

== See also ==
- Cylinder head
- Engine displacement
- Combustor
- Variable compression ratio
