= NEDO =

NEDO may refer to:

- National Economic Development Office, in the United Kingdom
- New Energy and Industrial Technology Development Organization, in Japan
