= CNG carrier =

High-pressure natural gas ship

Compressed natural gas (CNG) carrier ships are those designed for transportation of natural gas under high pressure. CNG carrier technology relies on high pressure, typically over 250 bar (2900 psi), to increase the density of the gas, but it is still 2.4 times less than that of LNG (426 kg/m^{3}). CNG carriers may find their place abreast with the well established technology of liquefied natural gas by LNG carriers as it is economical for medium distance marine transport. Most of the energy consumed for the gas pressurisation can be recovered as electricity using turboexpander while delivering CNG to the inland piping network at unloading jetty/harbour. CNG carriers are also alternate solutions to the undersea pipelines as they have less complicated fast loading and unloading features.

== Pressure container technology ==
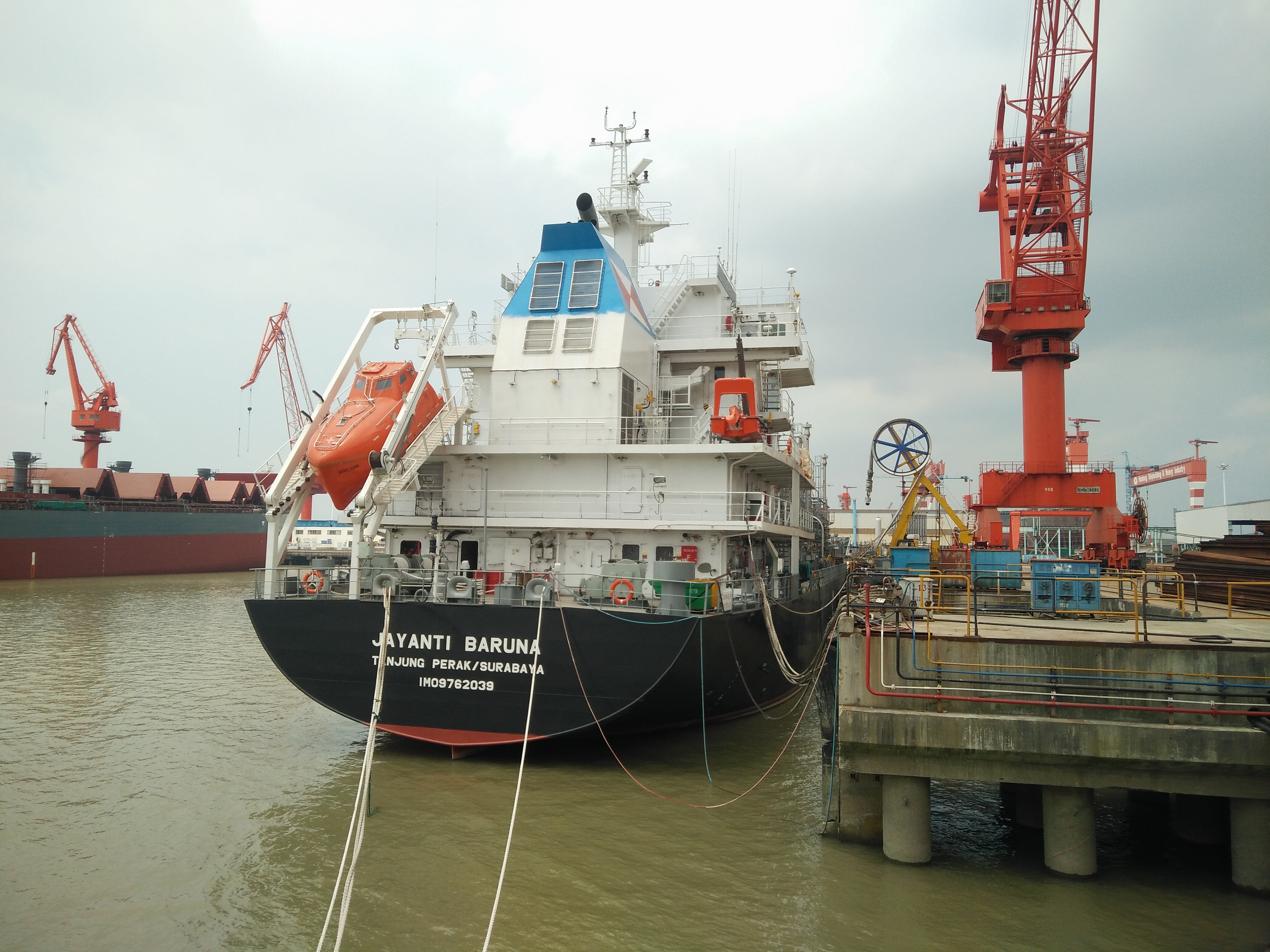
Jayanti Baruna - CNG Cargo Carrier, Indonesia

Several approaches to the problem of cost-effective high-pressure containers are possible. The main variables are the material to be used and the geometry of the containers. Standard method of storing non-condensed gases in metal flasks is not cost-effective for high-volume storage at high pressure. (This does not apply to gases such as butane and propane or their mixtures as in liquefied petroleum gas (LPG). LPG gases liquefy at ambient temperatures under moderate pressure and can be economically stored in steel containers of various sizes.)

New approaches to CNG technology include fiber-reinforced plastic containers and containers in the form of metal tubes of moderate diameter (typically 6" or 168 mm internal diameter). In one approach (Coselle) 17 kilometres (11 mi) of tubing is wound on a spindle. Such spindles are stackable and may be connected to achieve the desired capacity. In another approach (GASVESSEL) composite material containers are adopted allowing to increase the commercial payload for the CNG ship and significantly reduce the transport cost.

== Comparison ==
The CNG carrier is a single piece equivalent to the combination of floating liquefied natural gas, LNG carrier and floating regasification plant^{RU}. Unlike LNG transport, CNG transport has 100% flexibility in changing gas loading / unloading port without any time lag. The capital cost of CNG transport overseas is far less than the overall capital cost needed for LNG transport.

The gestation period of LNG transport infrastructure is a few years. Whereas a CNG carrier can be sourced from the available fleet. The CNG carrier is very helpful in bringing a gas field/pipeline to early production.

The propulsion fuel cost per unit natural gas transported by a CNG carrier is more than the fuel cost of a LNG carrier as CNG carrier is much heavier. CNG carrier transport is economical up to medium distances (< 2000 nmi) compared to LNG transport. The economical transport range increases with a fall in natural gas price or increasing spread between natural gas and LNG prices.

The CNG carrier can act as a storage vessel also to absorb the fluctuations in demand and production from a network of gas pipelines on daily basis and export/import natural gas on a contingency basis. This would enable to discontinue take-or-pay contracts in natural gas sales and also enable natural gas exchanges between unconnected pipeline networks.

The delivery schedule of CNG carriers can be extended/changed without any loss of cargo, unlike LNG carriers where the loss of LNG due to boil-off or evaporation takes place with the increase in journey time. CNG carriers are best suitable for floating storage as there is no loss of cargo with time.

The CNG carrier removes the dispatch bottle neck which is preventing monetizing of small isolated offshore gas fields, by enabling them to produce natural gas. Also, it removes the hurdle to monetizing the gas reserves of small isolated offshore associated oil and gas fields, by providing storage and transport of gas which otherwise would have been flared.

CNG carrier can also be used to transport ethane either in gas/liquid form and hydrogen gas to widen its applications.

== Beneficiary countries ==
- Japan, South Korea, Philippines and Taiwan can import CNG from Russia and Papua New Guinea
- India can import CNG from Qatar, Iran, Yamen, Oman, Myanmar, Israel (via Red Sea) and Mozambique
- Israel can export CNG to all countries having coast line with Mediterranean Sea and Black Sea including Western Europe and India.
- Russia can export CNG to Western Europe via Black Sea and Mediterranean Sea.
- United States can export CNG to Western Europe, Cuba, Greenland and Iceland.
- Turkmenistan and Kazakhstan can export CNG to Western Europe via Turkey, Armenia, Azerbaijan and Caspian Sea

== See also ==
- Liquefied natural gas
- LPG carrier
- Hydrogen tanker
- Compressed hydrogen tube trailer
- Gas carrier
