= Euro Quebec Hydro Hydrogen Project =

Former Canadian hydropower project

The Euro Quebec Hydro Hydrogen Project or EQHHP (also known as Euro Quebec Hydro Hydrogen Pilot Project or EQHHPP) was a 100 MW pilot project to study the shipping of Canadian hydropower converted via electrolysis into hydrogen and the shipping of the hydrogen to Hamburg, Germany. The time frame of phase B was 1992 to 1997.

The method of transport is a hydrogen tanker that carries smaller highly insulated hydrogen tanks filled with liquid hydrogen.

== See also ==
- Hydrogen economy
