= Hydrogen tanker =

Tank ship designed for transporting liquefied hydrogen

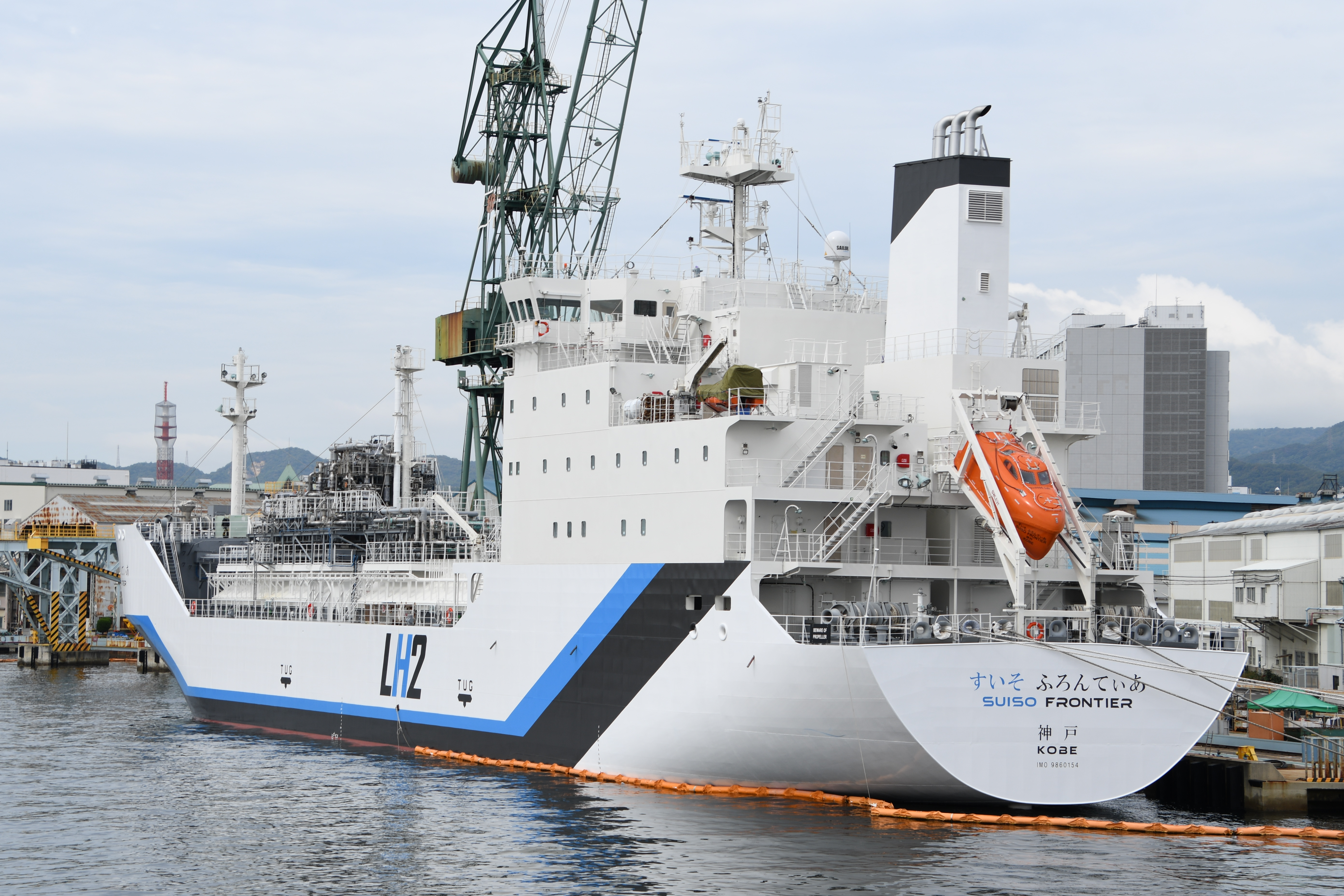
Port aft view of the world's first liquid hydrogen tanker, Suiso Frontier, at the Kawasaki Heavy Industries Kobe Shipyard on October 18, 2020

A hydrogen tanker or liquid hydrogen tanker is a tank ship designed for transporting liquefied hydrogen.

== Research ==
The World Energy Network research program of the Japanese New Sunshine Project was divided into 3 phases during the period 1993 to 2002, its goal was to study the distribution of liquid hydrogen with hydrogen tankers based on the LNG carrier technology of self-supporting tank designs such as the prismatic and spherical tank. Further research on maritime transport of hydrogen was done in the development for safe utilization and infrastructure of hydrogen project (2003–2007).

Similar to an LNG carrier the boil off gas can be used for propulsion of the ship.

== Demonstration tests ==
The "Suiso Frontier" collected a cargo of liquid hydrogen from the port of Hastings in Victoria, Australia on 28 January 2022 and arrived back in Kobe, Japan at the end of February, 2022 with the cargo. A second cargo was collected from the Hastings terminal in May, 2022 with a return to Japan in June 2022.

In November 2022, Approval in Principle (AiP) was granted by Nippon Kaiji Kyokai (ClassNK) for Kawasaki Heavy Industries's dual fuel generator engine using hydrogen gas as fuel, which will be installed on a 160,000 m^{3} liquefied hydrogen carrier developed by Kawasaki. Kawasaki intends to conduct a demonstration test of this engine after installing it on a large-scale liquefied hydrogen carrier which is planned to be commercialized in the mid-2020s. In June 2023, Kawasaki Heavy Industries announced its completion of technological development for a cargo containment system (CCS) to be used in large liquefied hydrogen carriers.

== See also ==
- Euro Quebec hydro hydrogen project
- Hydrogen economy
- Hydrogen infrastructure
- Hydrogen ship
