= Gas Agility =

LNG bunkering vessel

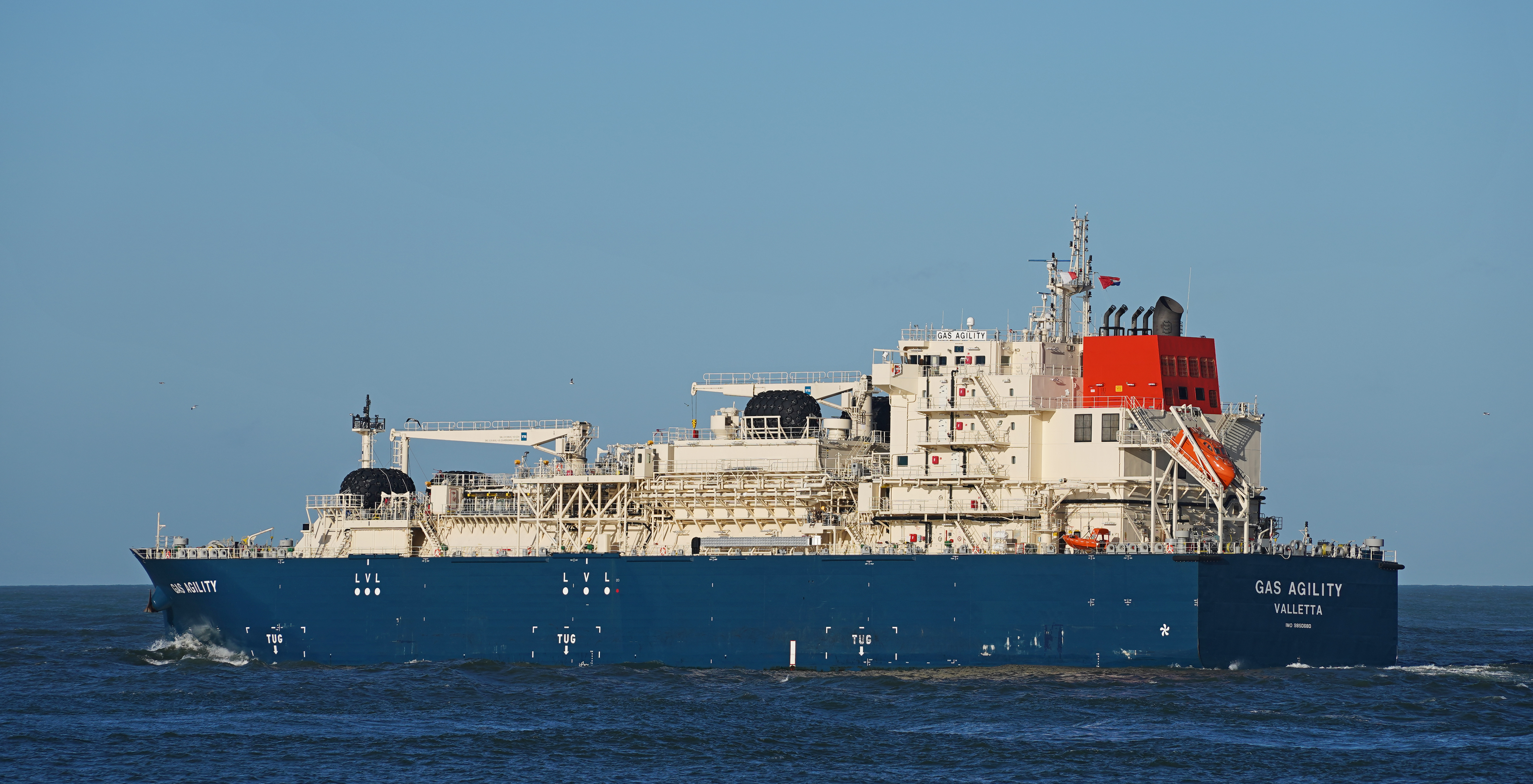

Class overview
- Operators: MOL
- In service: 2020–present

General characteristics
- Type: Bunkering tanker
- Tonnage: 17,645 GT
- Length: 136 m (446 ft 2 in)
- Beam: 25 m (82 ft 0 in)
- Draught: 16 m (52 ft 6 in)
- Propulsion: a dual-fuel diesel-electric
- Capacity: 18,600 cbm

Gas Agility is the world largest liquefied natural gas (LNG) bunkering vessel. It is also the first in a series of two ships to be constructed for Emerald Green Maritime at the Hudong Zhonghua Merhant Marine Mitsui.

The Gas Agility is equipped with Gaztransport & Technigaz's Mark3 flex membrane containment system built at Hudong–Zhonghua Shipbuilding in China near Shanghai. It is also fitted with innovative tank technologies such as the complete reliquefaction of boil-off gas to achieve zero vaporised gas loss. Gas Agility is owned by EGML, a wholly owned subsidiary of MOL, and chartered by Total's affiliate Total Marine Fuels Global Solutions (TMFGS). Construction started in China in November 2018 at Hudong–Zhonghua Shipbuilding's yard and delivered in April 2020. The vessel operated in Northern Europe where it would supply LNG to commercial ships including CMA CGM's nine ultra large container vessels (ULCVs) for a period of at least ten years.

== List of ships ==
Ship	IMO number	Delivery	Status	Ref
Gas Agility	9850680	30 Apr 2020	In service	
