= Philippe Berterottière =

French businessman

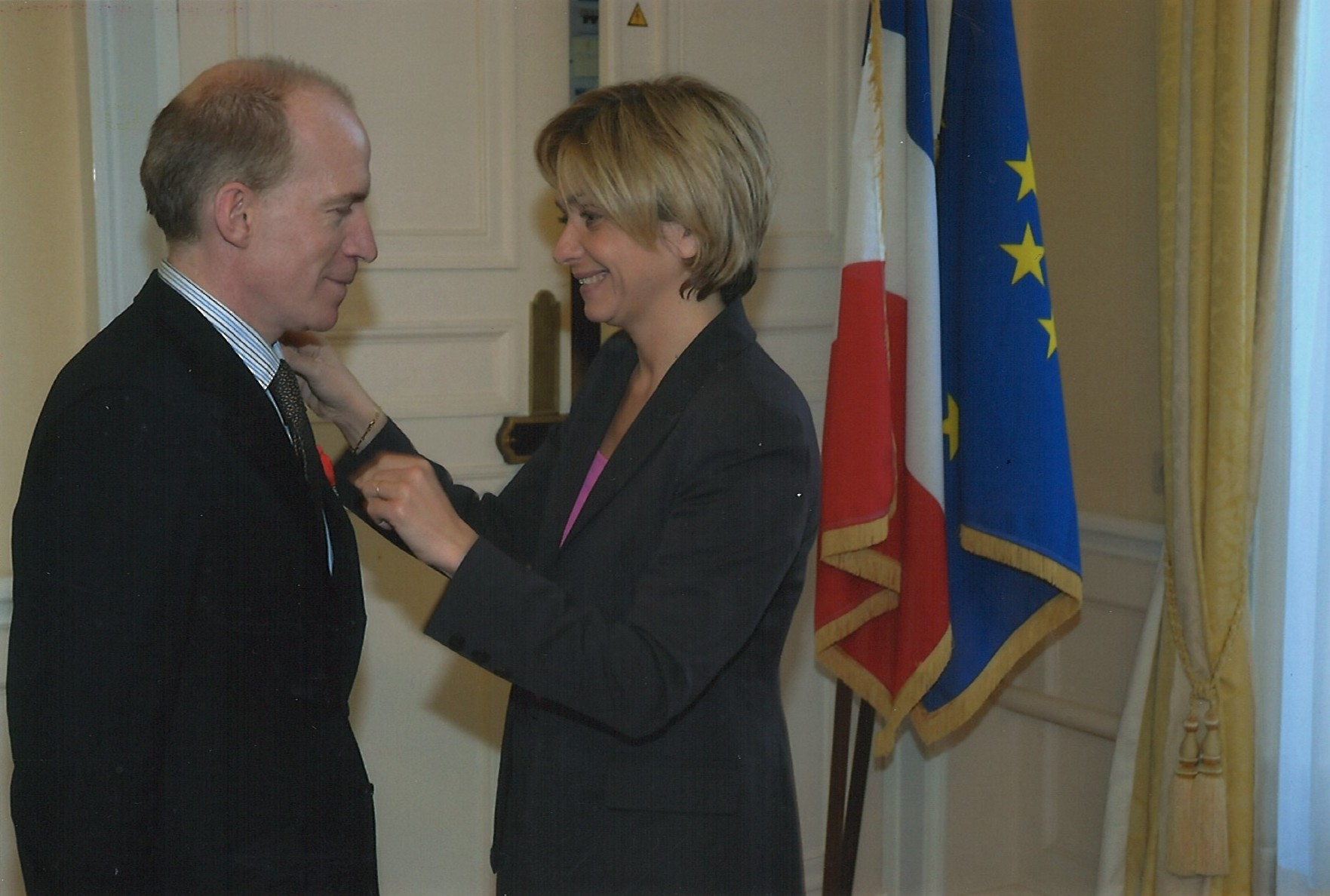
- Berterottière receiving the Order of Merit from Minister Pécresse
- Born: Philippe Bruno Berterottière; October 25, 1957 (age 68); Paris, France
- Other name: Philippe Berterottiere
- Education: Hautes Etudes Commerciales and Institut d’Etudes Politiques
- Occupation: Chairman and CEO of Gaztransport & Technigaz
- Honours: Knight Ordre du Mérite, Knight Légion d'honneur

Philippe Bruno Berterottière is a French businessman, Chevalier (Knight) Ordre du Mérite and Chevalier (Knight) Légion d'honneur for his contributions to France. He is currently the chairman and CEO of Gaztransport & Technigaz.

== Early life ==
Berterottière was born in Paris, France, on 25 October 1957. After school, he went on to study at the Institut d’Etudes Politiques where he graduated in 1981. He then completed a business degree at the Hautes Etudes Commerciales in 1982.

== Career ==
In 1982, Berterottière started his career with Airbus as a contract negotiator and after 3 years was promoted to director of business development, aftermarket, in 1986. In 1988, he joined the Matra Group as Sales Director for Asia in the Defense Division. In 1992, he joined Arianespace as Business Development Manager for Asia and the Middle East. In November 1998, he was appointed as sales manager. At the end of 1999, Berterottière was appointed as sales and marketing director of Arianespace and all of its subsidiaries and in 2001 he was appointed to the executive committee.

Whilst at Arianespace, Berterottière managed 20 clients and 15 contracts a year worth $60 million to $150 million. In 2004, under Berterottière's Sales and Marketing management, Arianespace held more than 50% of the world market for boosting satellites to geostationary transfer orbit (GTO).

In April 2009, Berterottière joined Gaztransport & Technigaz as director of business development. In September 2009, Berterottière was appointed as chief executive officer of Gaztransport & Technigaz. and on 11 December 2013, he was appointed as Chairman

== Honours ==
In 2004, Berterottière was awarded the Chevalier Ordre du Mérite as a commercial director of a space agency and for 21 years of professional activities and military service.

In 2009, Berterottière received a Prime Ministers award of the grade Chevalier Légion d'honneur for 26 years of professional activities as a commercial director and executive committee member of an NGO.
