= Suiso Frontier =

Liquid hydrogen carrier ship

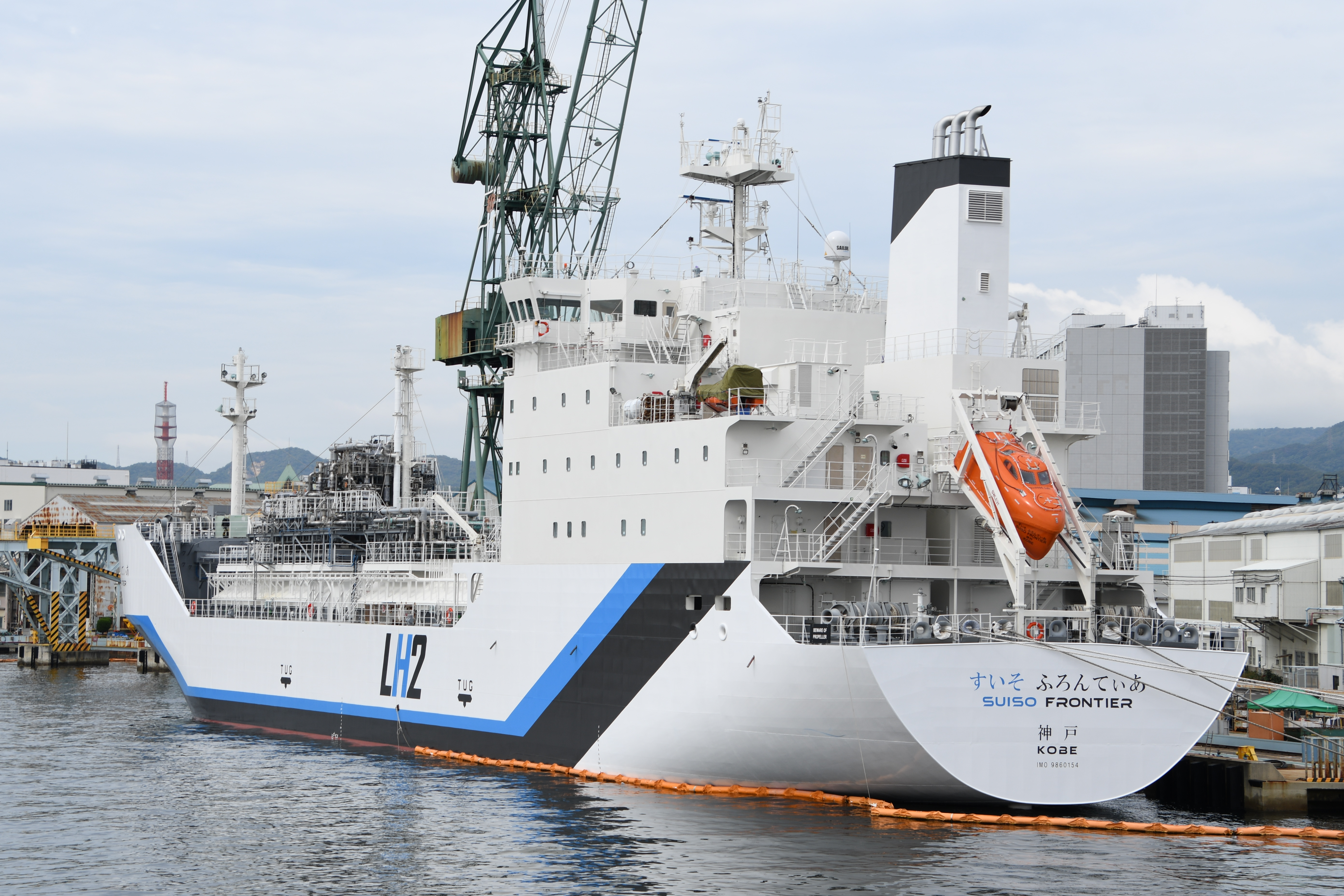
- Port aft view of the Suiso Frontier at the Kawasaki Heavy Industries Kobe Shipyard on October 18, 2020

History

Japan
- Name: Suiso Frontier
- Route: Japan-Australia
- Builder: Kawasaki Heavy Industries Ltd
- Launched: December 11, 2019
- Home port: Kobe
- Identification: IMO number: 9860154

General characteristics
- Type: Liquid carrier
- Tonnage: 8,000 GT
- Length: 116 m (381 ft)
- Depth: 10.6 m (35 ft) (molded)
- Propulsion: Diesel-electric
- Speed: 13.0 knots (24.1 km/h; 15.0 mph)
- Capacity: 1,250 m^{3} (44,000 cu ft)
- Crew: 25

The Suiso Frontier (Japanese: すいそ ふろんてぃあ; "Hydrogen Frontier") is the world's first liquid hydrogen carrier ship. Built by the Kawasaki Heavy Industries, it was put into service in 2019.

== Design and construction ==
The Suiso Frontier was built by Kawasaki Heavy Industries, following support by the governments of Japan and Australia. The ship carries liquid hydrogen, the first load of which was extracted from brown coal in Australia and carried to Kobe, Japan. As a prototype, she is planned to lead to a commercial liquid hydrogen sometime in the mid-2020s.

Although the first in service, a liquid hydrogen carrier ship is not a unique design. Korea Shipbuilding & Offshore Engineering of South Korea and the Wilhelmsen Group of Norway both have designs for a ship of the same type, the latter being a roll-on/roll-off vessel. A joint design by Canada's Ballard Power Systems and Australia's Global Energy Ventures is currently developing a ship where hydrogen is transported in a compressed gas form.

Kawasaki Heavy Industries is a member of HySTRA and, along with Iwatani, Shell, and Electric Power Development, plans to promote hydrogen as a fuel source.

The ship carries a double-shielded and double-insulated 1,250-cubic-meter tank to both hold and maintain hydrogen at a temperature of −253 °C (20 K). She is 116 meters long, displaces 8,000 gross tons, molded breadth of 18.9 m (62 ft), molded depth of 10.7 m (35 ft) and a molded draft of 4.6 m (15 ft). Its diesel-electric propulsion provides a top speed of 13 kn (24 km/h), maintained by a crew of 25.

The hydrogen's production plan quickly drew criticism for its management of the carbon dioxide that will be created as a byproduct.

== Service history ==
On December 24, 2021, she left Japan for a two-week trip to Port of Hastings, Australia, which is expected to return to Japan in mid-February 2022 with her first cargo. Her trip was extended to 16 days as the vessel avoided bad weather and rough seas.

== Incident ==
On the night of January 25, 2022, a malfunction occurred in the gas control system on the same ship anchored in Hastings Port.

An investigation by the Australian Transport Safety Bureau revealed that an improper type of electromagnetic valve with a different number of bolts was installed in the drive unit of the air fan exhaust damper of the ship's vaporized gas combustion system, causing the valve to be damaged during operation. This malfunction resulted in the closure of the damper of the fan, leading to inadequate airflow and overheating of the gas combustion system. The internal hydrogen flame became unstable, resulting in a 1-meter-high flame being emitted from the exhaust tower. Additionally, it was found that the control system of the gas combustion unit did not have the functionality to detect such unexpected valve closures during operation, and the automatic safety control was not effective.

Upon receiving radio communication from crew members who saw the flames from the exhaust tower and the alarm indicating an increase in exhaust temperature, the third officer closed the hydrogen supply valve to the gas combustion system and promptly shut down the gas combustion unit. There were no casualties from the fire. At the time, the ship had a crew of 24 members, all of whom were uninjured.

The Australian Transport Safety Bureau classified this event as a serious incident.

== Gallery ==
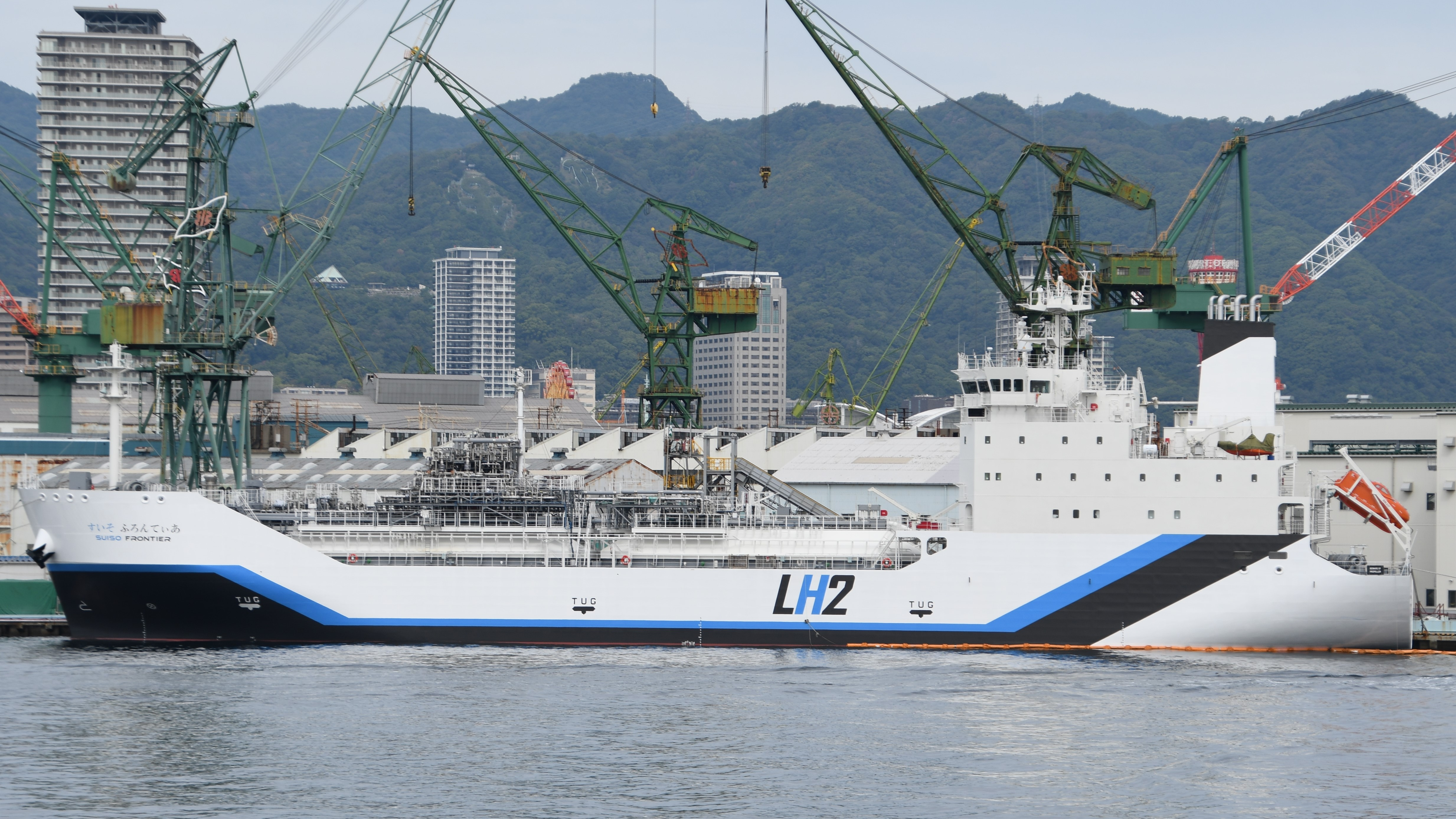
Port side of the Suiso Frontier at the Kawasaki Heavy Industries Kobe Shipyards on October 18, 2020

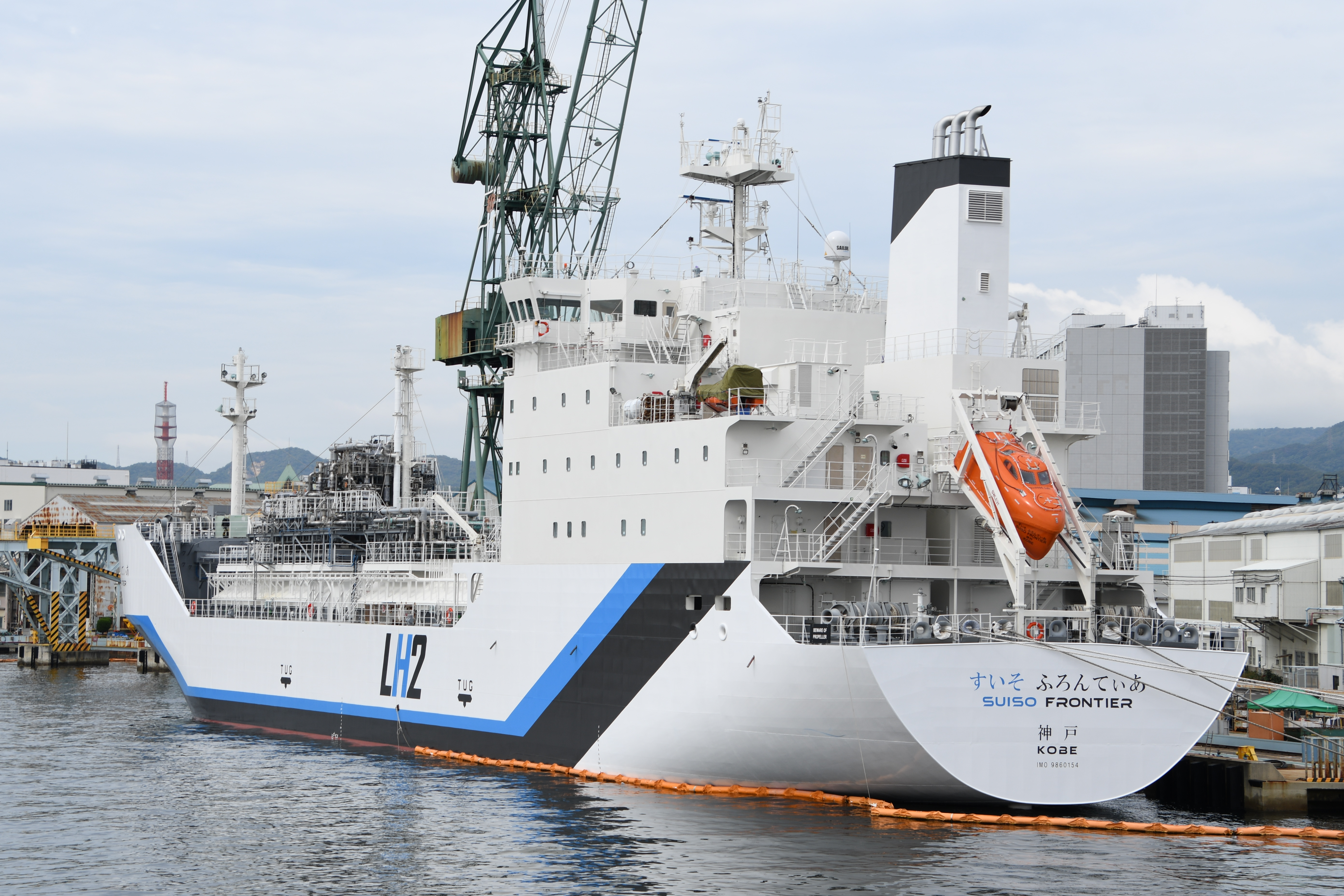
Port aft view of the Suiso Frontier at the Kawasaki Heavy Industries Kobe Shipyard on October 18, 2020
