= Gaztransport & Technigaz =

French engineering company

- Trade name: GTT
- Type: Société Anonyme
- Traded as: Euronext Paris: GTT; CAC Next 20
- ISIN: FR0011726835
- Industry: Engineering
- Founded: Gaztransport January 1966, 10; 60 years ago
- Headquarters: Saint-Rémy-lès-Chevreuse, France
- Area served: Worldwide
- Key people: Philippe Berterottière Chairman & Chief Executive Officer
- Services: Assistance & Intervention; Inspection & Monitoring; Performance & Optimization
- Revenue: ▲€396 million (2020)
- Operating income: ▲€236 million (2020)
- Net income: ▲€198 million (2020)
- Number of employees: 550 (2020)
- Subsidiaries: Cryovision; GTT North America; GTT Training; GTT SEA PTE; Ascenz; Marorka; Ose Engineering; Elogen; GTT Russia
- Website: gtt.fr

Gaztransport & Technigaz SA is a French multinational naval engineering company with headquarters in Saint-Rémy-lès-Chevreuse, France.

Trading as the GTT Group, the company is an engineering organization specializing in membrane containment systems dedicated to the transport and storage of liquefied gas worldwide. GTT has developed and patented multiple solutions for the liquefied gas industry, in particular for Liquefied Natural Gas (LNG). The company is the sole supplier of maritime containment tanks for LNG.

The current company was established through a merger between rival companies Gaztransport SA and Technigaz SA in 1994.

On the 27 February 2014 the GTT Group was listed on the Euronext Paris stock exchange.

== History ==
In the 1950s, European companies were looking for solutions to transport Algerian gas from the Sahara to Europe. The idea of a North African pipeline was scrapped due to regional instability at the time and this led to the first boom in the shipping of gas by sea in the form of a cryogenic liquid in LNG carriers.

After the Evian Accords in 1962, France purchased its first LNG carrier - the Jules Verne - for operation on the route between Oran and France. Great Britain already had two of these vessels at this time.

Both Gaztransport and Technigaz emerged as a result of the innovations taking place in this historical context. In 1963 Gazocean, a company jointly owned by Gaz de France and NYK Line, created a subsidiary called Technigaz responsible for developing new LNG transportation technology. In 1964 Technigaz filed for a patent for "wallpanels for so-called membrane tanks" which was granted in 1968 and which led to the development of the Mark I containment system. Between 1968 and 1979, twelve LNG carriers were built using Technigaz Mark technology. In 1983 Technigaz was sold to the Amrep Group which subsequently went bankrupt in 1984 and was itself taken over by the Bouygues Group. In 1994 Technigaz was merged with Gaztransport to create Gaztransport & Technigaz.

Gaztransport was founded on the 10 January 1966. In 1967 Phillips Petroleum and Marathon Oil, which held contracts to import gas into Japan, placed an order for two LNG carriers, Polar Alaska and Arctic Tokyo, that were built in the Swedish shipyard of Kockums. These ships remained in operation for 45 years. In 1969 the Polar Alaska was launched, and between 1969 and 1978, ten LNG carriers used the NO systems developed by Gaztransport. In 1994 Gaztransport was merged with Technigaz and Technigaz Shipping to create Gaztransport & Technigaz.

After Russia launched an invasion of Ukraine in 2022, the company continued to provide services to Russian clients, even as many major companies were pulling out of Russia. In January 2023 Gaztransport & Technigaz suspended all work with Russia on building fifteen Arc 7 LNG tankers.

== Company ==
=== Shareholders ===
as of May 2021, the Shareholders were:

Shareholder	Shareholding
ENGIE SA	30.4%
Invesco Advisers, Inc.	2.73%
The Vanguard Group	1.89%
BlackRock Fund Advisors	1.78%
Norges Bank Investment Management	1.68%
DNCA Finance SA	1.63%
Ostrum Asset Management SA	1.52%
Artisan Partners LP	1.49%
Amundi Asset Management SA	1.27%
Henderson Global Investors Ltd.	1.10%

=== Subsidiaries ===
as of April 2021, the Subsidiaries were:

Subsidiary	Ownership
GTT North America	100%
Cryovision	100%
GTT Training	100%
GTT SEA PTE	100%
Ascenz	75%
Marorka	100%
Ose Engineering	100%
Elogen	99,78%
GTT Russia	100%

== Technologies ==
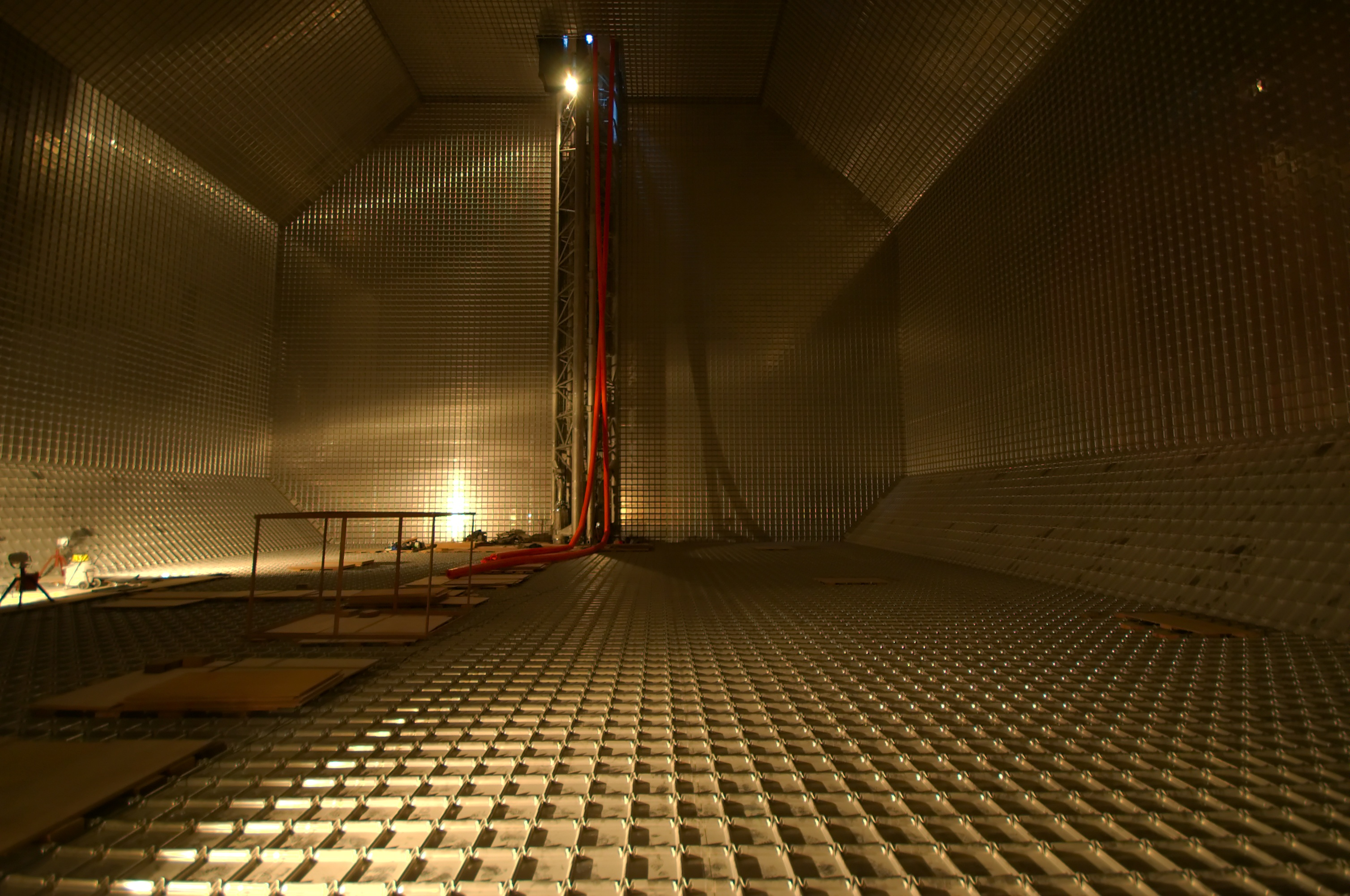
Liquid Natural Gas Membrane Tank

In order to store and transport Liquefied Natural Gas (LNG) an envelope or membrane system is required to separate the liquid gas at -163 °C from the ship's hull and to reduce evaporation.

GTT inherited the Mark and NO technologies from its founding companies and has since developed these technologies to their current forms.

- The Mark III systems use a membrane based cryogenic liner composed of a primary metallic membrane positioned on top of a prefabricated insulation panel including a complete secondary membrane. The membranes are directly supported by the ship’s inner hull.
- The NO96 systems are also composed of a membrane system that is a cryogenic liner directly supported by the ship’s inner hull. This liner includes two identical metallic membranes and two independent insulation layers.
- The NO96 Max systems offer a compromise between low boil-off and system strength, for better thermomechanical efficiency.

In addition, GTT has developed a new technology specifically for the transportation of Liquefied Petroleum Gas (LPG) called GTT MARS.

In June 2020 the National Institute of Industrial Property ranked GTT first in its leading companies list with 58 patents filed.

== Singapore hub ==
In April 2019 GTT announced that it would be creating a "digital hub of excellence" in Singapore.

== See also ==
- Liquefied Natural Gas
- Liquefied Petroleum Gas
- List of LNG terminals
