= Methane Pioneer =

Ship built in 1945

History
- Name: Marline Hitch (1945–46); Don Aurelio (1946–51); Nomarti (1951–57); Methane Pioneer (1957–67); Aristotle (1967–72)
- Builder: Walter Butler Shipbuilders
- Yard number: 344
- Launched: 25 June 1945
- Completed: 1945
- In service: 1945-1958 (cargo ship); 1959-1972 (LNG tanker)
- Identification: Call sign GBHU (1957–72); IMO number: 5233573
- Fate: Scrapped 1972

General characteristics (as converted)
- Type: LNG tanker
- Tonnage: 4,693 GRT; 4,907 DWT
- Capacity: 32,000 barrels (1957–72)

Methane Pioneer was the first oceangoing liquified natural gas tanker in the world. Built in 1945 as a cargo ship named Marline Hitch, the vessel was renamed Don Aurelio and Normarti before being rebuilt in 1958 for the purpose of transporting LNG and operated between 1959 and 1972. The ship was later renamed Aristotle.

== Service history ==
=== Early history ===
Methane Pioneer was built as yard number 344 by Walter Butler Shipbuilders in Duluth, Minnesota as a Type C1-M-AV1 cargo ship for the United States Maritime Commission. She was delivered as Marline Hitch in July 1945. As World War II came to an end shortly after it was delivered, Marline Hitch was sold privately under the name Don Aurelio in 1946. In 1951 the ship was renamed Normarti.

=== As Methane Pioneer ===
In 1958 Normarti, then owned by the Norgulf Shipping Line, was converted into a tanker at the Alabama Drydock and Shipbuilding Company in Mobile, Alabama and was delivered in October 1958, renamed Methane Pioneer. The project was funded by the British Gas Council and was operated by a joint venture company called Constock International Methane (CIM). CIM was formed as a partnership between Conoco and Union Stock Yards, and renamed Conch International Methane when Shell joined in 1959. She had a capacity of 32,000 barrels of LNG. Methane Pioneer was allocated the Call sign GBHU.

Methane Pioneer's maiden voyage was from Constock's LNG production facility on the Calcasieu River in Louisiana. Carrying the world's first ocean cargo of LNG, it left port on 25 January 1959 and reached its destination at Canvey Island in England on 20 February, taking 27 days to cross the Atlantic Ocean.

Methane Pioneer was later renamed Aristotle and operated by Stephenson Clarke Shipping, making 30 voyages between 1959 and 1972, when it was withdrawn from service and converted into a storage barge for LNG. She was scrapped in 1972.
