= New Sunshine Project =

Japanese technology project

The New Sunshine Project (NSS) is a Japanese project to develop the technologies for new energy and global environment, integrating the Sunshine, the Moonlight (Energy-saving technology R & D) and the Global Environment Technology Projects since 1993. It is the successor of the 1974 MITI Sunshine Project, and focuses on the development of photovoltaic, geothermal and hydrogen technology.

== Programs ==
The New Sunshine Project includes multiple programs, the first one being the "World Energy Net-work (WE-NET) research program" that was running from 1993 to 2002. Another program was the "Development for safe utilization and infrastructure of hydrogen" which ran from 2003 to 2007. This program was a project to develop the technologies for safe utilization and infrastructure of hydrogen and was the successor of the World Energy Network (WE-NET) research program.

The "Fundamental research project on advanced hydrogen science" program was active until most recently, having started in 2006 until concluding in 2012. It aimed to develop the technologies to enable the transportation and storage of large volumes of hydrogen in a compact form. It is the successor of the development for safe utilization and infrastructure of hydrogen research program (2003–2007).

== See also ==
- NEDO
- Hydrogen economy
- Hydrogen tanker
