= New Energy and Industrial Technology Development Organization =

Japanese public management organization

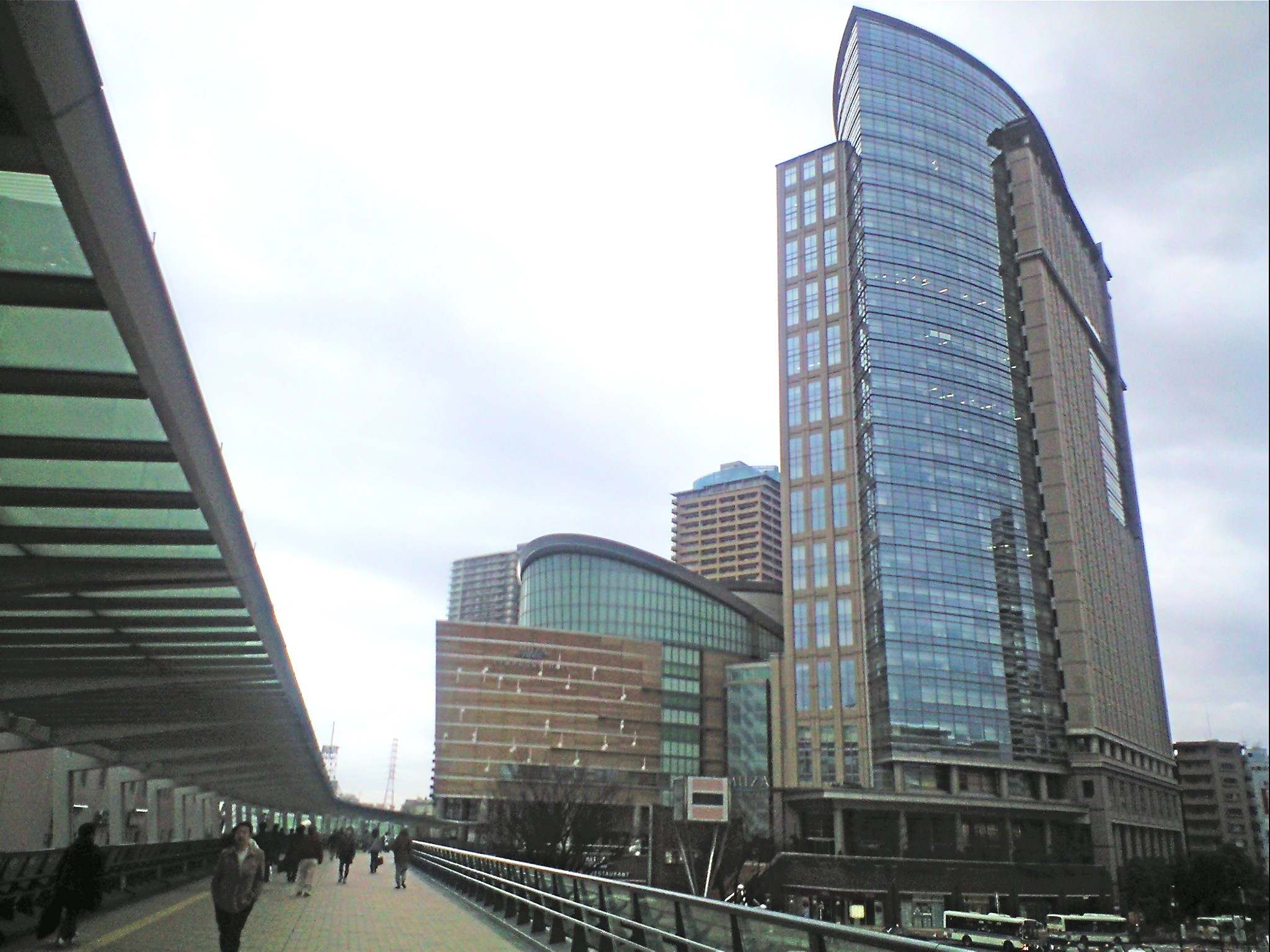
NEDO head office in Muza Kawasaki Central Tower

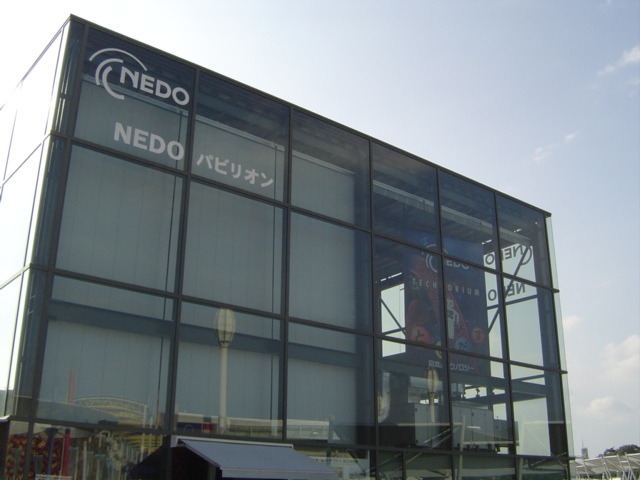
Expo 2005 NEDO pavilion (August 2005)

The New Energy and Industrial Technology Development Organization (新エネルギー・産業技術総合開発機構), or NEDO, is Japan's largest public management organization promoting research and development as well as deployment of industrial, energy and environmental technologies. In 2003, NEDO was reorganized as an Independent Administrative Institution. NEDO has approximately 1,000 personnel and domestic offices in Hokkaido, Kansai, and Kyushu and international offices in Washington D.C., Silicon Valley (California), Paris, Beijing, Bangkok, Jakarta and New Delhi. Its budget for fiscal year 2009 was 234,700,000,000 yen (approximately $2.6 billion), the vast majority of which was provided by Japan's Ministry of Economy, Trade and Industry (METI). Its head office is located just outside Tokyo in Kawasaki City, Kanagawa Prefecture.

NEDO has a number of projects in the United States, notably a smart grid and alternative energy project with two research laboratories in New Mexico, Sandia National Laboratories and Los Alamos National Laboratory (LANL). In March 2010, NEDO and the laboratories signed agreements in which NEDO will fund a smart grid research facility at LANL and smart house demonstration projects in both Los Alamos and Albuquerque, New Mexico. NEDO is investing $30 million (U.S.) on the projects for a four-year period.

== History ==
- October 1, 1980 - In response to the energy crises of 1973 and 1978, the New Energy and Development Organization is established under the Law Concerning the Promotion of the Development and Introduction of Alternative Energy to develop fossil fuel alternative energy technologies in order to stabilize world energy supplies and reduce Japan's dependency on imported energy sources.
- October 1, 1988 - Reorganized and scope of activities is expanded to include the research and development of industrial technologies. Name is changed to New Energy and Industrial Technology Development Organization (acronym remains NEDO).
- October 1, 2003 NEDO becomes an Independent Administrative Institution
- 2005 - NEDO Pavilion at Expo 2005, shares the results of many NEDO funded and managed R&D projects, including solar photovoltaic, fuel cell and robotic technology.
- 2010- NEDO and Hokkaido University developed a motor using magnets which are commonly used in electronics parts to lessen the burden of utilizing rare earth minerals.
- On march 19th 2017 a memorandum of understanding was signed to build a large-scale hybrid battery system demonstration project in Germany. The project aims to stabilize the distribution grid, and thereby control the electric power supply and demand balance, by charging and discharging storage batteries, and to establish a new business model for electricity trading using the battery system.

== See also ==
- New Sunshine Project
