= Micro-combustion =

Micro-combustion is the sequence of exothermic chemical reaction between a fuel and an oxidant accompanied by the production of heat and conversion of chemical species at micro level. The release of heat can result in the production of light in the form of either glowing or a flame. Fuels of interest often include organic compounds (especially hydrocarbons) in the gas, liquid or solid phase. The major problem of micro-combustion is the high surface to volume ratio. As the surface to volume ratio increases heat loss to walls of combustor increases which leads to flame quenching.

The development of miniaturized products such as microrobots, notebook computers, micro-aerial vehicles and other small scale devices is becoming increasingly important in our daily life. There is a growing interest in developing small scale combustors to power these micro-devices due to their inherent advantages of higher energy density, higher heat and mass transfer coefficients and shorter recharge times compared to electrochemical batteries. The energy density of hydrocarbon fuels is 20-50 times higher than the most advanced Li-ion concept based electrochemical batteries. The concept of the micro-heat engine was proposed by Epstein and Senturia in 1997. Since then, substantial amount of work has been done towards the development and application of such small scale devices to generate power through the combustion of hydrocarbon fuels. Micro-combustors are an attractive alternate to batteries as they have large surface area to volume ratio, due to which, significant amount of heat is transferred through the walls which leads to flame quenching. However, the increased rate of heat transfer through solid walls is advantageous in the case of steam reformers used for hydrogen production.

B. Khandelwal et al. have experimentally studied the flame stability limits and other characteristics in a two staged micro combustor. They found out that staged combustor leads to higher flame stability limits, in addition to that they also offer higher temperature profiles which would be helpful in utilizing the heat produced by combustion. Maruta et al. have experimentally studied the flame propagation characteristics of premixed methane air mixtures in a 2.0 mm diameter straight quartz channel with a positive wall temperature gradient along the flow direction. This was a simple one-dimensional configuration to study flame stabilization characteristics in microchannels. Other researchers have studied the flame stabilization behavior and combustion performance in a Swiss roll combustor, micro-gas turbine engines, a micro-thermo-photovoltaic system, a free piston knock engine, a micro-tube combustor, radial channel combustors, and in various other types of micro-combustor.
