= Bergesen (surname) =

Bergesen is a surname. Notable people with the surname include:

- Berge Sigval Natanael Bergesen (1914–1965), Norwegian shipowner
- Brad Bergesen (born 1985), professional baseball player
- Emma Bergesen (born 1999), Norwegian ice hockey player
- Finn Bergesen (1945–2012), Norwegian businessperson
- Helge Ole Bergesen (1949–2015), Norwegian political scientist and politician
- Morten Sigval Bergesen (born 1951), Norwegian shipowner
- Ole Bergesen (1832–1899), Norwegian priest and politician
- Ole Bergesen (1891–1955), Norwegian shipowner
- Ole Bergesen (1916–1965), Norwegian jurist and politician
- Sigval Bergesen (1863–1956), Norwegian shipowner and politician
- Sigval Bergesen the Younger (1893–1980), Norwegian shipowner
