= List of vessels built at Crichton-Vulcan and Wärtsilä Turku shipyards =

List of vessels built at Crichton-Vulcan and Wärtsilä Turku shipyards covers all projects built during 1924–1989 (1990, 1991) at Crichton-Vulcan (from 1965 Wärtsilä Turku Shipyard) and Wärtsilä Perno shipyard.

- Yard number is a project-specific running number. Unrealised projects: 802–807, 868–869, 1015, 1029–1030, 1032, 1174, 1253 and 1299–1300.
- Name is the original name of the vessel.
- Type, type of the vessel.
- Shipowner shows the assigner and the country (flag).
- Keel lay or order date is the date when the keel is laid on the dock, or the order has been signed off. Since project number 1083 the date means the order date; that is marked in Italic.
- Handover is the date when the vessel has been handed over to the customer. A vessel handed over by the estate following the bankruptcy of Wärtsilä Marine is marked with *. The ships finished by the follower Masa-Yards are marked with MY.

Yard number	Name	Type	Shipowner	Keel lay / Order date	Handover	Sources
701	Aura	Tugboat	(Finland) City of Turku	1924	1924	
702	Vetehinen	Submarine	(Finland) Finnish Navy	Aug 1927	5 Aug 1930	
703	Vesihiisi	Submarine	(Finland) Finnish Navy	Aug 1927	8 Nov 1930	
704	Iku-Turso	Submarine	(Finland) Finnish Navy	Aug 1927	10 Jun 1930	
705	Väinämöinen	Coastal defence ship	(Finland) Finnish Navy	15 Oct 1929	31 Dec 1932	
706	Ilmarinen	Coastal defence ship	(Finland) Finnish Navy	2 Jan 1931	3 Sep 1933	
707	Vesikko	Submarine	(Finland) Finnish Navy	Aug 1931	16 Oct 1933	
708	Hirvensalo	Ponton raft	(Finland) Infrastructure and Hydro Engineering Administration	1929	1929	
709	Exportles Nr 18	Steam tug	(Soviet Union) Mashinoimport	4 Nov 1932	29 Apr 1933	
710	Exportles Nr 19	Steam tug	(Soviet Union) Mashinoimport	5 Nov 1932	29 Apr 1933	
711	Exportles Nr 19	Steam tug	(Soviet Union) Mashinoimport	16 Jul 1932	28 Oct 1932	
712	Exportles Nr 20	Steam tug	(Soviet Union) Mashinoimport	16 Jul 1932	28 Oct 1932	
713	Exportles Nr 21	Steam tug	(Soviet Union) Mashinoimport	23 Jul 1932	29 Oct 1932	
714	Exportles Nr 22	Steam tug	(Soviet Union) Mashinoimport	23 Jul 1932	10 Nov 1932	
715	Exportles Nr 23	Steam tug	(Soviet Union) Mashinoimport	23 Jul 1932	11 Nov 1932	
716	Exportles Nr 6	Steam tug	(Soviet Union) Mashinoimport	24 Oct 1932	10 May 1933	
717	Exportles Nr 7	Steam tug	(Soviet Union) Mashinoimport	24 Oct 1932	10 May 1933	
718	Exportles Nr 24	Steam tug	(Soviet Union) Mashinoimport	27 Oct 1932	16 May 1933	
719	Exportles Nr 25	Steam tug	(Soviet Union) Mashinoimport	8 Nov 1932	16 May 1933	
720		Rowing raft	(Finland) CV (to own use)		1932	
721	Exportles Nr 21	Tanker	(Soviet Union) Mashinoimport	12 Jul 1932	7 Oct 1932	
722	Exportles Nr 20	Steam tug	(Soviet Union) Mashinoimport	2 Dec 1932	29 Apr 1933	
723		Motor tug	(Soviet Union) Mashinoimport	24 Apr 1933	27 May 1933	
724		Motor tug	(Soviet Union) Mashinoimport	24 Apr 1933	27 May 1933	
725		Floating dry dock	(Finland) Hietalahti Shipyard and Engineering Works	1 Aug 1933	7 Dec 1933	
726	Exportles Nr 24	Motor tug	(Soviet Union) Mashinoimport	13 Jan 1934	15 Mar 1934	
727	Exportles Nr 25	Motor tug	(Soviet Union) Mashinoimport	15 Jan 1934	15 Mar 1934	
728	Exportles Nr 26	Motor tug	(Soviet Union) Mashinoimport	15 Jan 1934	15 Mar 1934	
729	Jo Nr 1	Motor tug	(Soviet Union) Mashinoimport	22 Jan 1934	15 Mar 1934	
730	Irkutsk	Dredger	(Soviet Union) Mashinoimport	9 Feb 1934	5 May 1934	
731	Selenga Nr 5	Dredger	(Soviet Union) Mashinoimport	9 Feb 1934	28 May 1934	
732	Selenga Nr 4	Dredger	(Soviet Union) Mashinoimport	10 Feb 1934	27 May 1934	
733		Dock gate	(Finland) CV (to own use)		1934	
734		Motor tug	(Soviet Union) Mashinoimport	10 Nov 1934	29 Jan 1935	
735		Motor tug	(Soviet Union) Mashinoimport	10 Nov 1934	29 Jan 1935	
736		Motor tug	(Soviet Union) Mashinoimport	10 Nov 1934	29 Jan 1935	
737	Ordsonikidse	Steam tug	(Soviet Union) Mashinoimport	10 Dec 1934	31 Jan 1935	
738	Pargas 1	Barge	(Finland) Paraisten Kalkki Oy	1 Nov 1934	4 Feb 1935	
739	Pargas 2	Barge	(Finland) Paraisten Kalkki Oy	1 Nov 1934	4 Feb 1935	
740	Särkänsalmi	Ferry	(Finland) Infrastructure and Hydro Engineering Administration	1 Nov 1934	4 Feb 1935	
741		Police boat	(Finland) City of Helsinki	1 May 1935	15 Jun 1935	
742	Pionier	Motor cargo ship	(Soviet Union) Mashinoimport	10 Jul 1935	15 Nov 1935	
743	Johan Skeppstedt	Barge	(Finland) Ab Dalsbruk	1935	14 Sep 1935	
744	Rigel	Motor cargo ship	(Finland) FÅA	5 May 1936	13 Feb 1937	
745	Astrid Thordén	Motor cargo ship	(Finland) G. Thordéns rederi	25 Sep 1936	31 Jul 1937	
746	Carolina Thordén	Motor cargo ship	(Finland) G. Thordéns rederi	25 Mar 1937	1 Mar 1938	
747	Oksywie	Motor cargo ship	(Poland) Żegluga Polska	23 Jul 1937	17 Mar 1938	
748	Rozewie	Motor cargo ship	(Poland) Żegluga Polska	Aug 1937	11 Apr 1938	
749	Aurora	Motor cargo ship	(Finland) Suomi-Etelä-Amerikka Linja Oy	2 Sep 1937	21 Dec 1938	
750	Atlanta	Motor cargo ship	(Finland) Suomi-Etelä-Amerikka Linja Oy	20 Aug 1938	15 Apr 1939	
751	Bore II	Passenger steamer	(Finland) Höyrylaiva Oy Bore	1 Nov 1937	19 Dec 1938	
752	Mathilda Thordén	Motor cargo ship	(Finland) G. Thordéns rederi	20 Oct 1937	23 Aug 1938	
753	Zarja	Steam tug	(Soviet Union) Mashinoimport	15 Jun 1938	5 Dec 1938	
754	Troujenik	Steam tug	(Soviet Union) Mashinoimport	15 Jun 1938	5 Dec 1938	
755	Astrea	Cargo/passenger ship	(Finland) FÅA	12 Oct 1938	16 May 1941	
756	Froste	Motor cargo ship	(Sweden) Broströms rederi	21 Jan 1939	21 Dec 1938	
757	Selma Thordén	Motor cargo ship	(Finland) G. Thordéns rederi	21 Sep 1939	12 Dec 1942	
758	Kristina Thordén	Motor cargo ship	(Finland) G. Thordéns rederi	28 Oct 1939	28 Apr 1943	
759	Ruotsinsalmi	Minelayer	(Finland) Finnish Navy	11 Sep 1939	21 Nov 1940	
760	Riilahti	Minelayer	(Finland) Finnish Navy	11 Sep 1939	14 Dec 1940	
761	761	Steam tug	Soviet Union^{(Held by state of Finland until autumn 1944)}	1940	Jul 1941	
762	762	Steam tug	Soviet Union^{(Held by state of Finland until autumn 1944)}	1940	Jul 1941	
763	763	Steam tug	Soviet Union^{(Held by state of Finland until autumn 1944)}	1941	1942	
764	764	Steam tug	Soviet Union^{(Held by state of Finland until autumn 1944)}	1941	1942	
765	Föhn II	Steam tug	(Nazi Germany) Kriegsmarine	20 Feb 1941	20 May 1942	
766	Hugo Heinke	Steam tug	(Nazi Germany) Kriegsmarine	21 Feb 1941	27 May 1942	
767	Otto Eichler	Steam tug	(Nazi Germany) Kriegsmarine	22 Feb 1941	1 Jul 1942	
768	Floyen I	Steam tug	(Nazi Germany) Kriegsmarine	23 Feb 1941	28 Aug 1942	
769	Capella	Steam tug	(Nazi Germany) Kriegsmarine	15 Aug 1941	15 Oct 1942	
770	Floyen II	Steam tug	(Nazi Germany) Kriegsmarine	29 Sep 1941	25 Nov 1942	
771	Rabaul	Steam tug	(Nazi Germany) Kriegsmarine	5 Nov 1941	5 Feb 1942	
772	Mariensel	Steam tug	(Nazi Germany) Kriegsmarine	1 Apr 1942	24 Mar 1943	
773	Polangen	Steam tug	(Nazi Germany) Kriegsmarine	29 Apr 1942	17 May 1943	
774	Rüstersiel	Steam tug	(Nazi Germany) Kriegsmarine	12 Jun 1942	7 Jul 1943	
775	Polaris	Steam tug	(Nazi Germany) Kriegsmarine	6 Aug 1942	4 Sep 1943	
776	Gilgenburg	Steam tug	(Nazi Germany) Kriegsmarine	13 Oct 1942	12 Oct 1943	
777	Schwalbenberg	Steam tug	(Nazi Germany) Kriegsmarine	4 Dec 1942	15 Jan 1944	
778	Mövensteert	Steam tug	(Nazi Germany) Kriegsmarine	12 Jan 1943	10 Feb 1944	
779	Riesenburg	Steam tug	(Nazi Germany) Kriegsmarine	2 Mar 1943	14 Apr 1944	
780	Baku	Steam tug	(Nazi Germany) Kriegsmarine	12 May 1943	Sep 1944	
781	19/41	Barge	(Nazi Germany) Kriegsmarine	4 Jan 1941	7 Jul 1942	
782	20/41	Barge	(Nazi Germany) Kriegsmarine	26 Feb 1941	7 Jul 1942	
783	21/41	Barge	(Nazi Germany) Kriegsmarine	23 Jun 1941	1 Jul 1942	
784	22/41	Barge	(Nazi Germany) Kriegsmarine	27 Apr 1941	7 Jul 1942	
785	23/41	Barge	(Nazi Germany) Kriegsmarine	14 Oct 1941	14 Jul 1942	
786	LB 1	Barge	(Nazi Germany) Kriegsmarine	31 Oct 1941	28 Aug 1942	
787	Netzleger 6	Net layer	(Nazi Germany) Kriegsmarine	28 Feb 1942	25 Nov 1942	
788	Netzleger 8	Net layer	(Nazi Germany) Kriegsmarine	9 Mar 1942	22 May 1943	
789	27/41	Recovery ship	(Nazi Germany) Kriegsmarine	3 Jul 1942	Sep 1944	
790	28/41	Recovery ship	(Nazi Germany) Kriegsmarine	4 Aug 1942	Sep 1944	
791	Kapitan Gastello	Motor barge	Soviet Union (SOTEVA)	30 Oct 1942	5 Sep 1945	
792	Aleksandr Matrosov	Motor barge	Soviet Union (SOTEVA)	24 Nov 1942	7 Nov 1945	
793	Oleg Koshevoi	Motor barge	Soviet Union (SOTEVA)	28 Apr 1943	7 Jan 1946	
794	Netzleger 9	Net layer	(Nazi Germany) Kriegsmarine	25 May 1943	17 Jul 1944	
795	Netzleger 10	Net layer	(Nazi Germany) Kriegsmarine	7 Oct 1943	Sep 1944	
796	Hasan	Motor cargo ship	Soviet Union (SOTEVA)	17 Jul 1944	26 Oct 1945	
797	Sevan	Motor cargo ship	Soviet Union (SOTEVA)	28 Aug 1944	24 Dec 1945	
798	Finlandia	Motor cargo ship	(Finland) FÅA	20 Feb 1945	10 Sep 1946	
799	Ostrobotnia	Motor cargo ship	(Finland) FÅA	26 Mar 1945	11 Jan 1947	
800	Patria	Motor cargo ship	(Finland) FÅA	12 Jun 1945	19 Apr 1947	
801		Floating dry dock	(Finland) CV (to own use)	1 Mar 1945	29 Mar 1946	
808	Bjarmia	Motor cargo ship	(Finland) FÅA	15 Jul 1945	26 Aug 1947	
809	Kungsö	Motor cargo ship	(Finland) G. Erikssons rederi	9 Nov 1945	3 Jan 1948	
810	Murmanryba	Steam tug	Soviet Union (SOTEVA)	2 Aug 1945	27 Jun 1946	
811	Nariltjanin	Steam tug	Soviet Union (SOTEVA)	8 Aug 1945	8 Aug 1946	
812	Taimyr	Steam tug	Soviet Union (SOTEVA)	26 Oct 1945	27 Aug 1946	
813	Apollon	Steam tug	Soviet Union (SOTEVA)	29 Oct 1945	16 Sep 1946	
814	Gerkules	Steam tug	Soviet Union (SOTEVA)	15 Apr 1946	18 Sep 1946	
815	Prometei	Steam tug	Soviet Union (SOTEVA)	24 Apr 1946	16 Nov 1946	
816	Osljabja	Steam tug	Soviet Union (SOTEVA)	23 Jul 1946	30 Jan 1947	
817	Peresvet	Steam tug	Soviet Union (SOTEVA)	24 Jul 1946	26 Feb 1947	
818	Vasilij Buslajev	Steam tug	Soviet Union (SOTEVA)	28 Aug 1946	27 May 1947	
819	Drushinnik	Steam tug	Soviet Union (SOTEVA)	2 Oct 1946	17 Jun 1947	
820	Ruslan	Steam tug	Soviet Union (SOTEVA)	17 Dec 1946	15 Oct 1947	
821	Mars	Steam tug	Soviet Union (SOTEVA)	28 Jan 1947	8 Jan 1948	
822	Priboi	Steam tug	Soviet Union (SOTEVA)	28 Mar 1947	31 May 1948	
823	Nakat	Steam tug	Soviet Union (SOTEVA)	18 Apr 1947	8 Jul 1948	
824	Gerkules	Steam tug	Soviet Union (SOTEVA)	21 Jun 1947	4 Dec 1948	
825	Mogutshij	Steam tug	Soviet Union (SOTEVA)	15 Aug 1947	19 Mar 1949	
826	Ponoi	Steam tug	Soviet Union (SOTEVA)	4 Dec 1947	10 May 1949	
827	Volna	Steam tug	Soviet Union (SOTEVA)	26 Jan 1948	26 Jul 1949	
828	Stalingradets	Steam tug	Soviet Union (SOTEVA)	4 Dec 1948	10 Dec 1949	
829	Stalinets	Steam tug	Soviet Union (SOTEVA)	1 Jul 1948	13 Apr 1950	
830	Leninets	Steam tug	Soviet Union (SOTEVA)	7 Jul 1949	7 Jul 1950	
831	Donets	Steam tug	Soviet Union (SOTEVA)	28 Dec 1949	11 Mar 1951	
832	Bogatyr	Steam tug	Soviet Union (SOTEVA)	1 Aug 1949	29 Nov 1950	
833	Stalinets	Steam tug	Soviet Union (SOTEVA)	23 Nov 1949	30 Dec 1950	
834	Kamenka	Steam tug	Soviet Union (SOTEVA)	30 Jun 1950	31 Oct 1951	
835		Steam tug	Soviet Union (SOTEVA)	10 Feb 1950	28 May 1951	
836	Oljenjek	Steam tug	Soviet Union (SOTEVA)	15 Aug 1950	27 Dec 1951	
837	Tshesha	Steam tug	Soviet Union (SOTEVA)	5 Apr 1950	24 Jul 1951	
838		Steam tug	Soviet Union (SOTEVA)	10 Apr 1951	28 Apr 1952	
839		Steam tug	Soviet Union (SOTEVA)	11 Jul 1951	30 Apr 1952	
840	Kureika	Barge	Soviet Union (SOTEVA)	7 Dec 1945	2 Aug 1946	
841	Daljdykan	Barge	Soviet Union (SOTEVA)	26 Feb 1946	29 Aug 1946	
842	L-1	Barge	Soviet Union (SOTEVA)	21 May 1946	18 Sep 1946	
843	L-2	Barge	Soviet Union (SOTEVA)	4 Aug 1945	18 Dec 1946	
844		Barge	Soviet Union (SOTEVA)	9 Sep 1946	28 Feb 1947	
845	L-3	Barge	Soviet Union (SOTEVA)	7 Dec 1946	29 May 1947	
846	L-4	Barge	Soviet Union (SOTEVA)	4 Feb 1947	17 Jul 1947	
847	Onega	Barge	Soviet Union (SOTEVA)	14 Apr 1947	5 Nov 1947	
848	Rybatshij	Barge	Soviet Union (SOTEVA)	27 May 1947	25 May 1948	
849	Polujev	Barge	Soviet Union (SOTEVA)	4 Sep 1947	8 Jul 1948	
850	Kola	Barge	Soviet Union (SOTEVA)	23 Dec 1947	25 Oct 1948	
851	Indiga	Barge	Soviet Union (SOTEVA)	25 Nov 1948	19 May 1949	
852	Keretz	Barge	Soviet Union (SOTEVA)	11 Feb 1949	14 Jun 1949	
853	Kija	Barge	Soviet Union (SOTEVA)	12 Mar 1949	27 Jul 1949	
854	Tundra	Barge	Soviet Union (SOTEVA)	30 May 1949	10 Dec 1949	
855		Barge	Soviet Union (SOTEVA)	6 Oct 1949	12 Apr 1950	
856	Kavkaz	Barge	Soviet Union (SOTEVA)	8 Dec 1949	16 May 1950	
857		Barge	Soviet Union (SOTEVA)	22 Dec 1949	31 May 1950	
858	Altai	Barge	Soviet Union (SOTEVA)	17 Dec 1949	30 Jul 1950	
859	Petshora	Barge	Soviet Union (SOTEVA)	13 May 1950	5 Jan 1951	
860	Jana	Barge	Soviet Union (SOTEVA)	23 Jun 1950	27 Jan 1951	
861	Viga	Barge	Soviet Union (SOTEVA)	9 Nov 1950	30 Apr 1951	
862	Nesj	Barge	Soviet Union (SOTEVA)	2 Jun 1950	28 May 1951	
863	Oma	Barge	Soviet Union (SOTEVA)	28 Nov 1950	24 Jul 1951	
864	Kazbek	Barge	Soviet Union (SOTEVA)	24 Feb 1950	30 Jun 1950	
865		Barge	Soviet Union (SOTEVA)	16 Jul 1952	30 Nov 1952	
866		Barge	Soviet Union (SOTEVA)	21 Jul 1952	27 Nov 1952	
867		Barge	Soviet Union (SOTEVA)	14 Oct 1952	18 Apr 1953	
870	Baskuntshak	Motor cargo ship	Soviet Union (SOTEVA)	24 Mar 1948	19 Feb 1949	
871	Eljton	Motor cargo ship	Soviet Union (SOTEVA)	23 Sep 1948	12 Oct 1949	
872	Sivash	Motor cargo ship	Soviet Union (SOTEVA)	23 Sep 1948	8 Jun 1950	
873	Antares	Motor cargo ship	(Finland) FÅA	5 May 1948	6 Apr 1949	
874	Pomjatj Iljitsha	Motor cargo ship	Soviet Union (SOTEVA)	9 May 1949	29 Nov 1949	
875	Fenno	Hydrobus	(Finland) Oy Sjöbuss Ab	1947	Jun 1947	
876	Esso Finlandia	Tanker	(Finland) Nobel-Standard Oy	4 Apr 1949	25 Apr 1950	
877	Imandra	Motor cargo ship	Soviet Union (SOTEVA)	18 Mar 1950	9 May 1951	
878	Vygozero	Motor cargo ship	Soviet Union (SOTEVA)	17 May 1950	30 Apr 1951	
879	Leningrad	Steam tug	Soviet Union (SOTEVA)	30 Apr 1948	29 Sep 1949	
880	Habarov	Steam tug	Soviet Union (SOTEVA)	5 Nov 1948	28 Jul 1950	
881	Donets	Steam tug	Soviet Union (SOTEVA)	9 Jul 1949	31 Jul 1950	
882	Nevelskij	Steam tug	Soviet Union (SOTEVA)	15 Oct 1949	5 Sep 1950	
883	Arhangelsk	Motor cargo ship	(Soviet Union) Transmashimport	6 Oct 1951	31 Jan 1953	
884	Amderma	Motor cargo ship	Soviet Union (SOTEVA)	25 May 1951	30 Nov 1951	
885	Uglitsh	Motor cargo ship	(Soviet Union) Transmashimport	20 Oct 1951	15 Aug 1952	
886		Ponton recovery vessel	(Soviet Union) Transmashimport	28 Mar 1951	12 May 1952	
887		Ponton recovery vessel	(Soviet Union) Transmashimport	21 May 1951	12 May 1952	
888		Ponton recovery vessel	(Soviet Union) Transmashimport	28 Mar 1951	24 Sep 1951	
889		Ponton recovery vessel	(Soviet Union) Transmashimport	5 May 1951	18 Oct 1951	
890		Motor raft	(Finland) CV (to own use)		1950	
891	Mgla	Steam tug	(Soviet Union) Transmashimport	20 May 1950	4 Sep 1951	
892	Prontjitjev	Steam tug	(Soviet Union) Transmashimport	18 Dec 1950	6 Oct 1951	
893	Sannikov	Steam tug	(Soviet Union) Transmashimport	7 Mar 1951	3 Dec 1951	
894		Steam tug	(Soviet Union) Transmashimport	5 Oct 1951	11 Jul 1952	
895	Priliv	Steam tug	(Soviet Union) Transmashimport	14 Nov 1951	26 Aug 1952	
896		Steam tug	(Soviet Union) Transmashimport	14 Feb 1952	29 Sep 1952	
897		Steam tug	(Soviet Union) Transmashimport	8 Mar 1952	14 Oct 1952	
898	Morshovjets	Steam tug	(Soviet Union) Transmashimport	30 Apr 1952	6 Nov 1952	
899	Kolgujev	Steam tug	(Soviet Union) Transmashimport	19 May 1952	10 Dec 1952	
900	Mendelejev	Steam tug	(Soviet Union) Transmashimport	16 Jun 1952	31 Dec 1952	
901	Udarnyj	Steam tug	(Soviet Union) Sudoimport	13 Oct 1952	9 Apr 1953	
902	Svobodnyj	Steam tug	(Soviet Union) Sudoimport	23 Oct 1952	30 Jun 1953	
903	Amazar	Steam tug	(Soviet Union) Sudoimport	15 Nov 1952	4 Jul 1953	
904	Chador	Steam tug	(Soviet Union) Sudoimport	23 Dec 1952	29 Jul 1953	
905	Delfin	Steam tug	(Soviet Union) Sudoimport	5 Feb 1953	9 Sep 1953	
906	Mosalsk	Steam tug	(Soviet Union) Sudoimport	4 Mar 1953	30 Sep 1953	
907	Torshok	Steam tug	(Soviet Union) Sudoimport	30 Mar 1953	28 Oct 1953	
908	Nevelj	Steam tug	(Soviet Union) Sudoimport	24 Apr 1953	14 Nov 1953	
909	Bjelosersk	Steam tug	(Soviet Union) Sudoimport	29 May 1953	28 Nov 1953	
910	Arbat	Steam tug	(Soviet Union) Sudoimport	22 Jun 1953	11 Dec 1953	
911	Volokolamsk	Motor cargo ship	(Soviet Union) Sudoimport	7 Feb 1951	8 Oct 1951	
912	Jenisensk	Motor cargo ship	(Soviet Union) Sudoimport	2 Mar 1951	29 Oct 1951	
913	Bobruisk	Motor cargo ship	(Soviet Union) Sudoimport	3 Nov 1951	10 Dec 1952	
914	Mogiljev	Motor cargo ship	(Soviet Union) Sudoimport	21 Apr 1951	17 Dec 1952	
915	Mirgorod	Motor cargo ship	(Soviet Union) Sudoimport	12 May 1952	23 Feb 1953	
916	Pjatigorks	Motor cargo ship	(Soviet Union) Sudoimport	1 Oct 1952	29 Apr 1953	
917	Rjashsk	Motor cargo ship	(Soviet Union) Sudoimport	23 Oct 1952	16 Jul 1953	
918	Brest	Motor cargo ship	(Soviet Union) Sudoimport	5 Jan 1953	30 Sep 1953	
919	Pinsk	Motor cargo ship	(Soviet Union) Sudoimport	31 Jan 1953	30 Oct 1953	
920	Armavir	Motor cargo ship	(Soviet Union) Sudoimport	12 May 1953	17 Apr 1954	
921	Budjonnovsk	Motor cargo ship	(Soviet Union) Sudoimport	15 Jun 1953	14 May 1954	
922	Voroshilovsk	Motor cargo ship	(Soviet Union) Sudoimport	22 Sep 1953	19 Jun 1954	
923	Voroshilovgrad	Motor cargo ship	(Soviet Union) Sudoimport	19 Mar 1954	6 Nov 1954	
924	Stalino	Motor cargo ship	(Soviet Union) Sudoimport	26 Apr 1954	18 Dec 1954	
925		Barge	(Soviet Union) Transmashimport	5 Jul 1951	24 Nov 1951	
926		Barge	(Soviet Union) Transmashimport	10 Aug 1951	30 Nov 1951	
927		Barge	(Soviet Union) Transmashimport	6 Sep 1951	6 Dec 1951	
928		Barge	(Soviet Union) Transmashimport	6 Feb 1952	11 Jul 1952	
929		Barge	(Soviet Union) Transmashimport	28 Feb 1952	18 Aug 1952	
930		Barge	(Soviet Union) Transmashimport	17 Mar 1952	29 Mar 1952	
931	Kljasjma	Tanker	(Soviet Union) Transmashimport	28 Apr 1951	29 Apr 1952	
932	Nertsha	Tanker	(Soviet Union) Transmashimport	1 Oct 1951	31 May 1952	
933		Tanker	(Soviet Union) Transmashimport	15 Jan 1952	31 Aug 1952	
934	Tshardshou	Tanker	(Soviet Union) Transmashimport	23 Jul 1952	31 Jul 1953	
935	Mary	Tanker	(Soviet Union) Transmashimport	14 Jan 1953	30 Sep 1953	
936	Baltijsk	Motor cargo ship	(Soviet Union) Transmashimport	12 Oct 1954	30 Sep 1955	
937	Severdnaja Dvina	Motor cargo ship	(Soviet Union) Transmashimport	27 Jul 1954	11 May 1955	
938	Zapadnaja Dvina	Motor cargo ship	(Soviet Union) Transmashimport	30 Dec 1954	25 Jul 1955	
939	Jushnyj Bug	Motor cargo ship	(Soviet Union) Transmashimport	20 Apr 1955	30 Oct 1955	
940	Ho Ping 18	Motor cargo ship	State of China	1 Jul 1954	11 Mar 1955	
941	Ho Ping 19	Motor cargo ship	State of China	25 Nov 1954	30 Jun 1955	
942	Ho Ping 21	Motor cargo ship	State of China	11 Mar 1955	15 Sep 1955	
943		Ponton recovery vessel	(Soviet Union) Transmashimport	21 May 1952	27 Nov 1952	
944		Ponton recovery vessel	(Soviet Union) Transmashimport	18 Jul 1952	11 Dec 1952	
945		Ponton recovery vessel	(Soviet Union) Transmashimport	3 Nov 1952	22 Jun 1953	
946		Ponton recovery vessel	(Soviet Union) Transmashimport	13 Jan 1953	25 Jun 1953	
947		Ponton recovery vessel	(Soviet Union) Transmashimport	13 Jan 1953	18 Jul 1953	
948		Ponton recovery vessel	(Soviet Union) Transmashimport	4 Apr 1953	18 Sep 1953	
949		Ponton recovery vessel	(Soviet Union) Transmashimport	8 Jun 1953	21 Oct 1953	
950		Ponton recovery vessel	(Soviet Union) Transmashimport	15 Dec 1953	22 May 1954	
951		Ponton recovery vessel	(Soviet Union) Transmashimport	19 Jan 1954	13 Jul 1954	
952		Ponton recovery vessel	(Soviet Union) Transmashimport	24 Feb 1954	23 Jul 1954	
953		Ponton recovery vessel	(Soviet Union) Transmashimport	17 May 1954	4 Sep 1954	
954		Ponton recovery vessel	(Soviet Union) Transmashimport	22 Feb 1954	20 Sep 1954	
955		Ponton recovery vessel	(Soviet Union) Sudoimport	1955	16 Aug 1955	
956		Ponton recovery vessel	(Soviet Union) Sudoimport	1955	30 Sep 1955	
957		Ponton recovery vessel	(Soviet Union) Sudoimport	1955	14 Jun 1956	
958	Mitshurinsk	Motor cargo ship	(Soviet Union) Sudoimport	2 May 1955	17 Dec 1956	
959	Bratsk	Motor cargo ship	(Soviet Union) Sudoimport	17 Dec 1956	15 Oct 1957	
960	Lidice	Motor cargo ship	(Czechoslovakia) Čechofracht	7 Nov 1953	14 Nov 1954	
961	Otpor	Steam tug	(Soviet Union) Sudoimport	17 Jul 1953	21 Dec 1953	
962		Steam tug	(Soviet Union) Sudoimport	22 Aug 1953	27 Jan 1954	
963	Otpor	Steam tug	(Soviet Union) Sudoimport	12 Sep 1953	25 Feb 1954	
964	Una	Steam tug	(Soviet Union) Sudoimport	2 Oct 1953	15 Mar 1954	
965	Kuzomenj	Steam tug	(Soviet Union) Sudoimport	22 Oct 1953	31 Mar 1954	
966	Murmansk	Steam tug	(Soviet Union) Sudoimport	12 Nov 1953	27 Apr 1954	
967	Kobzarj	Steam tug	(Soviet Union) Sudoimport	2 Dec 1953	15 May 1954	
968	Titan	Steam tug	(Soviet Union) Sudoimport	19 Dec 1953	11 Jun 1954	
969	Bugrino	Steam tug	(Soviet Union) Sudoimport	16 Jan 1954	26 Jun 1954	
970		Steam tug	(Soviet Union) Sudoimport	6 Feb 1954	20 Jul 1954	
971		Steam tug	(Soviet Union) Sudoimport	25 Feb 1954	5 Aug 1954	
972	Berezanj	Steam tug	(Soviet Union) Sudoimport	16 Mar 1954	7 Aug 1954	
973	Leninets	Steam tug	(Soviet Union) Sudoimport	5 Apr 1954	4 Sep 1954	
974	Zenit	Steam tug	(Soviet Union) Sudoimport	27 Apr 1954	30 Oct 1954	
975		Steam tug	(Soviet Union) Sudoimport	15 May 1954	16 Nov 1954	
976	Sahalinets	Steam tug	(Soviet Union) Sudoimport	3 Jun 1954	7 Dec 1954	
977	Muromets	Steam tug	(Soviet Union) Sudoimport	22 Jun 1954	30 Dec 1954	
978	Ladoga	Steam tug	(Soviet Union) Sudoimport	13 Jul 1954	20 Jan 1955	
979	Solntsedar	Steam tug	(Soviet Union) Sudoimport	14 Aug 1954	5 Feb 1955	
980		Steam tug	(Soviet Union) Sudoimport	3 Sep 1954	7 Mar 1955	
981		Steam tug	(Soviet Union) Sudoimport	20 Sep 1954	1 Apr 1955	
982		Steam tug	(Soviet Union) Sudoimport	9 Oct 1954	14 May 1955	
983		Steam tug	(Soviet Union) Sudoimport	26 Oct 1954	23 Jun 1955	
984		Steam tug	(Soviet Union) Sudoimport	12 Nov 1954	23 Jun 1955	
985	Komunist	Steam tug	(Soviet Union) Sudoimport	16 Dec 1954	21 Jul 1955	
986	Metrostrojevits	Steam tug	(Soviet Union) Sudoimport	20 May 1955	8 Dec 1955	
987	Kandalaksha	Steam tug	(Soviet Union) Sudoimport	28 May 1955	8 Dec 1955	
988	Skif	Steam tug	(Soviet Union) Sudoimport	21 Jul 1955	14 Dec 1955	
989	Poljarnyj	Steam tug	(Soviet Union) Sudoimport	28 Jul 1955	31 Dec 1955	
990	Marksist	Steam tug	(Soviet Union) Sudoimport	22 Sep 1955	30 Jan 1956	
991	Leningradets	Steam tug	(Soviet Union) Sudoimport	19 Aug 1955	18 Feb 1956	
992	Energitshnyj	Steam tug	(Soviet Union) Sudoimport	10 Oct 1955	25 Apr 1956	
993	Kolshida	Steam tug	(Soviet Union) Sudoimport	10 Nov 1955	18 May 1956	
994		Steam tug	(Soviet Union) Sudoimport	2 Dec 1955	19 Jun 1956	
995	Leningrad	Steam tug	(Soviet Union) Sudoimport	2 Dec 1955	30 Jun 1956	
996	Kagul	Steam tug	(Soviet Union) Sudoimport	18 Apr 1956	10 Sep 1956	
997	Donbass	Steam tug	(Soviet Union) Sudoimport	18 Apr 1956	28 Sep 1956	
998	Dnjestr	Motor cargo ship	(Soviet Union) Sudoimport	30 Jun 1955	17 Aug 1956	
999	Donets	Motor cargo ship	(Soviet Union) Sudoimport	11 Jan 1956	24 Oct 1956	
1000	Angra	Motor cargo ship	(Finland) AL Oy	19 Dec 1955	17 Apr 1957	
1001	Furmanov	Motor cargo ship	(Soviet Union) Sudoimport	21 Dec 1955	28 Dec 1956	
1002	Chapayev	Motor cargo ship	(Soviet Union) Sudoimport	16 Apr 1956	3 Apr 1957	
1003	Frjazino	Motor cargo ship	(Soviet Union) Sudoimport	5 Sep 1956	8 Jun 1957	
1004	Frolovo	Motor cargo ship	(Soviet Union) Sudoimport	26 Nov 1956	18 Jul 1957	
1005	Fastov	Motor cargo ship	(Soviet Union) Sudoimport	20 Jun 1957	5 Mar 1958	
1006	Fatezh	Motor cargo ship	(Soviet Union) Sudoimport	7 Nov 1957	24 May 1958	
1007	Floreshty	Motor cargo ship	(Soviet Union) Sudoimport	7 Feb 1958	19 Sep 1958	
1008	Faisabad	Motor cargo ship	(Soviet Union) Sudoimport	2 May 1958	19 Mar 1959	
1009	Farab	Motor cargo ship	(Soviet Union) Sudoimport	25 Aug 1958	16 Jul 1959	
1010	Faleshty	Motor cargo ship	(Soviet Union) Sudoimport	13 Nov 1958	16 Sep 1959	
1011	Firovo	Motor cargo ship	(Soviet Union) Sudoimport	13 Jul 1959	11 May 1960	
1012	Firjuza	Motor cargo ship	(Soviet Union) Sudoimport	1 Oct 1959	1 Jul 1960	
1013	Frjanovo	Motor cargo ship	(Soviet Union) Sudoimport	18 Jun 1960	30 Nov 1960	
1014	Western Trader	Motor cargo ship	Western Transport Co.	16 Oct 1957	15 Jan 1959	
1016	Actinia	Motor cargo ship	(Finland) Suomi-Etelä-Amerikka Linja Oy	12 Dec 1957	30 Oct 1958	
1017	Wiiri	Motor cargo ship	(Finland) Suomen Tankkilaiva Oy	2 Apr 1960	25 Jul 1961	
1018		Ponton recovery vessel	(Soviet Union) Sudoimport	31 May 1955	29 Jun 1955	
1019		Ponton recovery vessel	(Soviet Union) Sudoimport	20 Dec 1955	25 May 1956	
1020		Ponton recovery vessel	(Soviet Union) Sudoimport	21 Nov 1955	11 Aug 1956	
1021		Ponton recovery vessel	(Soviet Union) Sudoimport	2 Jan 1956	28 Sep 1956	
1022		Ponton recovery vessel	(Soviet Union) Sudoimport	16 Apr 1956	26 Oct 1956	
1023		Cargo ship hull	(Sweden) Eriksbergs Mekaniska Verkstad	7 Jul 1956	20 Dec 1956	
1024	Ho Ping 22	Motor cargo ship	State of China	15 Sep 1955	15 May 1956	
1025	Ho Ping 23	Motor cargo ship	State of China	1 Oct 1955	28 Jun 1956	
1026	Ho Ping 24	Motor cargo ship	State of China	9 Jul 1956	5 Jan 1957	
1027	Kirovsk	Motor cargo ship	(Soviet Union) Sudoimport	25 Feb 1957	12 Dec 1957	
1028	Izhevsk	Motor cargo ship	(Soviet Union) Sudoimport	18 May 1957	12 Mar 1958	
1031	Anne-Marie	Motor cargo ship	(Finland) G. Thordéns rederi	12 Jul 1957	16 Sep 1958	
1033	Nr 1033	Steam tug	(Soviet Union) Sudoimport	2 May 1956	17 Oct 1956	
1034	Pervomajsk	Steam tug	(Soviet Union) Sudoimport	2 May 1956	30 Oct 1956	
1035	Dzharyljgats	Steam tug	(Soviet Union) Sudoimport	2 Jul 1956	24 Nov 1956	
1036	Sudzhuk	Steam tug	(Soviet Union) Sudoimport	2 Jul 1956	30 Nov 1956	
1037	Perekop	Steam tug	(Soviet Union) Sudoimport	18 Sep 1956	25 Feb 1957	
1038	Svjetogorsk	Steam tug	(Soviet Union) Sudoimport	18 Sep 1956	12 Mar 1957	
1039	No. 1039	Steam tug	(Soviet Union) Sudoimport	19 Oct 1956	9 Apr 1957	
1040	Nr 1040	Steam tug	(Soviet Union) Sudoimport	19 Oct 1956	8 May 1957	
1041	Gonets	Steam tug	(Soviet Union) Sudoimport	10 Dec 1956	28 May 1957	
1042	Komi	Steam tug	(Soviet Union) Sudoimport	10 Dec 1956	25 Jun 1957	
1043	Karel	Steam tug	(Soviet Union) Sudoimport	18 Feb 1957	16 Jul 1957	
1044	Evenk	Steam tug	(Soviet Union) Sudoimport	18 Feb 1957	28 Aug 1957	
1045	Tuvinets	Steam tug	(Soviet Union) Sudoimport	16 Apr 1957	18 Sep 1957	
1046	Bashkir	Steam tug	(Soviet Union) Sudoimport	16 Apr 1957	7 Oct 1957	
1047	Burjat	Steam tug	(Soviet Union) Sudoimport	17 Jun 1957	1 Nov 1957	
1048	Abhazets	Steam tug	(Soviet Union) Sudoimport	17 Jun 1957	27 Nov 1957	
1049	Kaliningrad	Steam tug	(Soviet Union) Sudoimport	15 Oct 1957	30 Apr 1958	
1050	Kronstadt	Steam tug	(Soviet Union) Sudoimport	15 Oct 1957	11 Jun 1958	
1051	Mingrelets	Steam tug	(Soviet Union) Sudoimport	27 Jan 1958	21 Aug 1958	
1052		Steam tug	(Soviet Union) Sudoimport	27 Jan 1958	2 Sep 1958	
1053		Steam tug	(Soviet Union) Sudoimport	14 Apr 1958	8 Oct 1958	
1054		Steam tug	(Soviet Union) Sudoimport	14 Apr 1958	15 Nov 1958	
1055		Steam tug	(Soviet Union) Sudoimport	23 Jun 1958	19 Jan 1959	
1056		Steam tug	(Soviet Union) Sudoimport	23 Jun 1958	12 Feb 1959	
1057	Dolinsk	Cargo ship	(Soviet Union) Sudoimport	9 Apr 1958	2 Jun 1959	
1058	Berdjansk	Cargo ship	(Soviet Union) Sudoimport	6 May 1958	29 Jun 1959	
1059	Almetjevsk	Cargo ship	(Soviet Union) Sudoimport	25 Feb 1959	22 Apr 1960	
1060	Aleksandrovsk	Cargo ship	(Soviet Union) Sudoimport	1 Jul 1959	3 Jun 1960	
1061		Ponton recovery vessel	(Soviet Union) Sudoimport	26 Jan 1957	29 May 1957	
1062		Ponton recovery vessel	(Soviet Union) Sudoimport	26 Jan 1957	30 Jun 1957	
1063		Ponton recovery vessel	(Soviet Union) Sudoimport	1957	27 Aug 1957	
1064		Ponton recovery vessel	(Soviet Union) Sudoimport	1957	3 Oct 1957	
1065		Ponton recovery vessel	(Soviet Union) Sudoimport	1957	31 Oct 1957	
1066	Wilke	Cargo ship	(Finland) Suomen Tankkilaiva Oy	Oct 1960	26 Oct 1961	
1067	Svaneholm	Cargo ship	(Sweden) S.A.L.	12 Feb 1959	2 Jan 1960	
1068	Mandalay	Cargo ship	(Sweden) Svenska Ostasiatiska Kompaniet AB	25 Jun 1959	12 Jul 1960	
1069		Steam tug	(Soviet Union) Sudoimport	4 Oct 1958	25 Mar 1959	
1070		Steam tug	(Soviet Union) Sudoimport	4 Oct 1958	24 Apr 1959	
1071		Steam tug	(Soviet Union) Sudoimport	15 Jan 1959	8 Jun 1959	
1072		Steam tug	(Soviet Union) Sudoimport	15 Jan 1959	29 Jun 1959	
1073	Sretensk	Cargo ship	(Soviet Union) Sudoimport	12 Sep 1958	10 Sep 1959	
1074	Kislodovsk	Cargo ship	(Soviet Union) Sudoimport	13 Oct 1958	18 Nov 1959	
1075	Atkarsk	Cargo ship	(Soviet Union) Sudoimport	28 Jan 1959	12 Feb 1960	
1076	Alapajevsk	Cargo ship	(Soviet Union) Sudoimport	25 Apr 1960	3 Dec 1960	
1077		Ponton recovery vessel	(Soviet Union) Sudoimport	24 Apr 1958	7 Jan 1959	
1078	Araguaya	Cargo ship	(Finland) Suomi-Etelä-Amerikka Linja Oy	11 Nov 1959	18 Oct 1960	
1079	Aconcagua	Cargo ship	(Finland) Suomi-Etelä-Amerikka Linja Oy	3 Dec 1959	3 Jan 1961	
1080	Granvik	Cargo ship	(Finland) Oy Semtrans Ab	10 Aug 1960	17 Feb 1961	
1081	Arcturus	Cargo ship	(Finland) FÅA	Jun 1959	30 Aug 1960	
1082	Baltic	Cargo ship	(Finland) FÅA	Jun 1959	24 Nov 1960	
1083	Odensholm	Cargo ship	(Sweden) S.A.L.	29 Feb 1960	18 Apr 1962	
1084	Vretaholm	Cargo ship	(Sweden) S.A.L.	29 Feb 1960	21 May 1962	
1085	Blankaholm	Cargo ship	(Sweden) S.A.L.	29 Feb 1960	19 Oct 1962	
1086	Sagaholm	Cargo ship	(Sweden) S.A.L.	29 Feb 1960	8 Jul 1963	
1087	Hektos	Cargo ship	(Finland) FÅA	7 Apr 1960	15 Mar 1961	
1088	Thebeland	Cargo ship	(Sweden) Svenska Orientlinjen AB	14 Apr 1960	17 Dec 1961	
1089	Trojaland	Cargo ship	(Sweden) Ångfartygs AB Tirfing	14 Apr 1960	15 Jan 1963	
1090	Krasnograd	Cargo ship	(Soviet Union) Sudoimport	7 Jun 1960	29 Dec 1961	
1091	Kimovsk	Cargo ship	(Soviet Union) Sudoimport	7 Jun 1960	20 Jun 1962	
1092	Kasimov	Cargo ship	(Soviet Union) Sudoimport	7 Jun 1960	1 Sep 1962	
1093	Karatshayevsk	Cargo ship	(Soviet Union) Sudoimport	7 Jun 1960	26 Oct 1962	
1094	Ljgov	Cargo ship	(Soviet Union) Sudoimport	24 May 1960	2 Aug 1961	
1095	Tshernyahovsk	Cargo ship	(Soviet Union) Sudoimport	24 May 1960	27 Oct 1961	
1096	Kovrov	Cargo ship	(Soviet Union) Sudoimport	7 Jun 1960	18 Dec 1962	
1097	Kaliningrad	Cargo ship	(Soviet Union) Sudoimport	7 Jun 1960	7 Jun 1963	
1098	Kanev	Cargo ship	(Soviet Union) Sudoimport	7 Jun 1960	30 Aug 1963	
1099	Kaspijsk	Cargo ship	(Soviet Union) Sudoimport	7 Jun 1960	30 Oct 1963	
1100	Krasnoufimsk	Cargo ship	(Soviet Union) Sudoimport	7 Jun 1960	20 Dec 1963	
1101	Corona	Cargo ship	(Finland) FÅA	17 Jun 1960	15 May 1961	
1102	Hebe	Cargo ship	(Finland) FÅA	10 Nov 1960	25 Jan 1962	
1103	Oihonna	Cargo ship	(Finland) FÅA	10 Nov 1960	28 Feb 1962	
1104	Lapponia	Cargo ship	(Finland) FÅA	10 Nov 1960	27 Apr 1962	
1105	Castor	Cargo ship	(Finland) FÅA	10 Nov 1960	17 Sep 1962	
1106	Tyrusland	Cargo ship	(Sweden) Svenska Orientlinjen AB	14 Nov 1960	31 Oct 1963	
1107	(Tor; no. 374)	Icebreaker hull	(Finland) Wärtsilä Hietalahti shipyard	8 Dec 1961	13 Jul 1963	
1108	Krasnokamsk	Cargo ship	(Soviet Union) Sudoimport	3 Nov 1962	8 Apr 1964	
1109	Klin	Cargo ship	(Soviet Union) Sudoimport	3 Nov 1962	29 Apr 1964	
1110	Krasnouraljsk	Cargo ship	(Soviet Union) Sudoimport	3 Nov 1962	18 Jun 1964	
1111	Krasnodon	Cargo ship	(Soviet Union) Sudoimport	3 Nov 1962	19 Sep 1964	
1112	Kommunarsk	Cargo ship	(Soviet Union) Sudoimport	3 Nov 1962	14 Jan 1965	
1113	Krasnoje Selo	Cargo ship	(Soviet Union) Sudoimport	3 Nov 1962	11 Mar 1965	
1114	Krasnogvardeisk	Cargo ship	(Soviet Union) Sudoimport	3 Nov 1962	19 May 1965	
1115	Krasnozavodsk	Cargo ship	(Soviet Union) Sudoimport	3 Nov 1962	28 Jul 1965	
1116	Komsomolets Uzbekistana	Cargo ship	(Soviet Union) Sudoimport	3 Nov 1962	8 Oct 1965	
1117	Malmvik	Cement carrier	(Finland) Semtrans	28 Feb 1963	30 May 1964	
1118	Finnseal	Cargo ship	(Finland) Enso-Gutzeit	5 Jul 1963	11 Jul 1964	
1119	Lotila	Cargo ship	(Finland) Yhtyneet Paperitehtaat	5 Jul 1963	2 Oct 1964	
1120	Rekola	Cargo ship	(Finland) Yhtyneet Paperitehtaat	5 Jul 1963	27 Nov 1964	
1121	Finnfighter	Cargo ship	(Finland) Enso-Gutzeit	5 Jul 1963	6 Feb 1965	
1122	Finnboston	Cargo ship	(Finland) Amer-Tupakka Oy	5 Jul 1963	12 Dec 1964	
1123	Finnhawk	Cargo ship	(Finland) Enso-Gutzeit	5 Jul 1963	26 Mar 1965	
1124	Finnarrow	Cargo ship	(Finland) Enso-Gutzeit	5 Jul 1963	28 May 1965	
1125	Mälarvik	Cement carrier	(Sweden) Skånska Cement AB	29 Apr 1964	14 Sep 1965	
1126	Forsvik	Bulk carrier	(Sweden) Ångbåts AB Ferm	8 May 1964	29 Nov 1965	
1127	Clio	Cargo ship	(Finland) FÅA	8 Jul 1964	21 Sep 1965	
1128	Fennia	Cargo ship	(Finland) FÅA	8 Jul 1964	17 Nov 1965	
1129	Annika	Cargo ship	(Finland) Lovisa Rederi Ab	14 Jul 1964	5 Jun 1965	
1130	Finnmaid	Cargo ship	(Finland) Merivienti Oy	8 Jul 1964	30 Jul 1965	
1131	Finn-Enso	Cargo ship	(Finland) Enso-Gutzeit	25 Aug 1964	14 Dec 1965	
1132	Västanvik	Cement carrier	(Sweden) Skånska Cement AB	27 Aug 1964	2 Mar 1966	
1133	Prins Hamlet	Cruise ferry	(Sweden) Lion Ferry AB	18 Feb 1965	14 May 1966	
1134	Tilia Gorthon	Bulk carrier	(Sweden) Gorthons Rederier AB	19 Feb 1965	17 Jun 1966	
1135	Ingrid Gorthon	Bulk carrier	(Sweden) Gorthons Rederier AB	19 Feb 1965	10 Oct 1966	
1136	Altair	Cargo ship	(Germany) Argo Reederei AG	4 May 1965	8 Jul 1966	
1137	Algenib	Cargo ship	(Germany) Argo Reederei AG	4 May 1965	14 Oct 1966	
1138	Nils Gorthon	Bulk carrier	(Sweden) Gorthons Rederier AB	3 May 1965	1 Dec 1966	
1139	Margit Gorthon	Bulk carrier	(Sweden) Gorthons Rederier AB	3 May 1965	4 Jan 1967	
1140	Auriga	Cargo ship	(Germany) Argo Reederei AG	31 May 1965	30 Mar 1967	
1141	Komsomolets Kirgizij	Cargo ship	(Soviet Union) Sudoimport	17 Jun 1965	14 Jul 1966	
1142	Komsomolets Tadjikistana	Cargo ship	(Soviet Union) Sudoimport	17 Jun 1965	26 Sep 1966	
1143	Komsomolets Estonij	Cargo ship	(Soviet Union) Sudoimport	17 Jun 1965	3 Nov 1966	
1144	Komsomolets Latvij	Cargo ship	(Soviet Union) Sudoimport	17 Jun 1965	10 Dec 1966	
1145	Komsomolets Litvy	Cargo ship	(Soviet Union) Sudoimport	17 Jun 1965	1 Feb 1967	
1146	Novgorod	Cargo ship	(Soviet Union) Sudoimport	17 Jun 1965	29 Jun 1967	
1147	Novosibirsk	Cargo ship	(Soviet Union) Sudoimport	17 Jun 1965	10 Aug 1967	
1148	Novokuztnetsk	Cargo ship	(Soviet Union) Sudoimport	17 Jun 1965	14 Sep 1967	
1149	Novomoskovsk	Cargo ship	(Soviet Union) Sudoimport	17 Jun 1965	27 Oct 1967	
1150	Novokuibyshevsk	Cargo ship	(Soviet Union) Sudoimport	17 Jun 1965	28 Nov 1967	
1151	Novotroitsk	Cargo ship	(Soviet Union) Sudoimport	17 Jun 1965	3 Apr 1968	
1152	Novodruzhesk	Cargo ship	(Soviet Union) Sudoimport	17 Jun 1965	29 May 1968	
1153	Novoaltaisk	Cargo ship	(Soviet Union) Sudoimport	17 Jun 1965	27 Jun 1968	
1154	Gregersö	Cargo ship	(Finland) Rederi Ab Gustav Eriksson	17 Sep 1965	2 Mar 1967	
1155	San Joaquin Valley	Reefer ship	(Sweden) Rederi AB Nordstjernan	29 Dec 1965	10 Mar 1968	
1156	Aconcagua Valley	Reefer ship	(Sweden) Rederi AB Nordstjernan	29 Dec 1965	28 Oct 1968	
1157	Höegh Opal	Cargo ship	(Norway) Leif Höegh & Co AS	18 Jan 1966	6 Sep 1967	
1158	Höegh Orchid	Cargo ship	(Norway) Leif Höegh & Co AS	18 Jan 1966	29 Dec 1967	
1159	Höegh Orris	Cargo ship	(Norway) Leif Höegh & Co AS	18 Jan 1966	6 Feb 1968	
1160	Tsna	Cable layer	(Soviet Union) Sudoimport	16 Mar 1966	20 Dec 1968	
1161	Bohème	Cruise ship	(Sweden) Wallenius Rederier	27 May 1966	12 Nov 1968	
1162	Kotkaniemi	Bulk carrier	(Finland) Rikkihappo Oy	26 Jul 1966	30 Oct 1968	
1163	Garcilaso	Cargo ship	(Peru) Compañia Peruana de Vapores	29 Sep 1966	6 Feb 1969	
1164	Sabogal	Cargo ship	(Peru) Compañia Peruana de Vapores	29 Sep 1966	14 May 1969	
1165	Vallejo	Cargo ship	(Peru) Compañia Peruana de Vapores	29 Sep 1966	23 May 1969	
1166	Chocano	Cargo ship	(Peru) Compañia Peruana de Vapores	29 Sep 1966	20 Apr 1970	
1167	Palma	Cargo ship	(Peru) Compañia Peruana de Vapores	29 Sep 1966	17 Jul 1970	
1168	Tello	Cargo ship	(Peru) Compañia Peruana de Vapores	29 Sep 1966	18 Nov 1970	
1169	Axel Johnson	Container ship	(Sweden) Rederi AB Nordstjernan	27 Dec 1966	14 Jun 1969	
1170	Annie Johnson	Container ship	(Sweden) Rederi AB Nordstjernan	27 Dec 1966	4 Dec 1969	
1171	Margaret Johnson	Container ship	(Sweden) Rederi AB Nordstjernan	27 Dec 1966	12 Mar 1970	
1172	San Francisco	Container ship	(Sweden) Rederi AB Nordstjernan	27 Dec 1966	7 Aug 1970	
1173	Antonia Johnson	Container ship	(Sweden) Rederi AB Nordstjernan	27 Dec 1966	30 Dec 1971	
1175	Donets	Cable layer	(Soviet Union) Sudoimport	16 Mar 1966	3 Jul 1969	
1176	Zeya	Cargo ship	(Soviet Union) Sudoimport	16 Mar 1966	20 Nov 1970	
1177	Novomirgorod	Cargo ship	(Soviet Union) Sudoimport	24 Jan 1966	30 Sep 1969	
1178	Novopolotsk	Cargo ship	(Soviet Union) Sudoimport	24 Jan 1966	30 Nov 1969	
1179	Novopolynsk	Cargo ship	(Soviet Union) Sudoimport	24 Jan 1966	28 Feb 1970	
1180	Novovyatsk	Cargo ship	(Soviet Union) Sudoimport	24 Jan 1966	23 Apr 1970	
1181	Novozybkob	Cargo ship	(Soviet Union) Sudoimport	24 Jan 1966	12 Sep 1970	
1182	Novogrudok	Cargo ship	(Soviet Union) Sudoimport	24 Jan 1966	20 Nov 1970	
1183	Novolvovsk	Cargo ship	(Soviet Union) Sudoimport	24 Jan 1966	28 Dec 1970	
1184	Germundö	Cargo ship	(Finland) Rederi Ab Gustav Eriksson	19 Jun 1968	26 Sep 1969	
1185	Höegh Pilot	Cargo ship	(Norway) Leif Höegh & Co AS	23 Jul 1968	15 Jan 1970	
1186	Höegh Pride	Cargo ship	(Norway) Leif Höegh & Co AS	23 Jul 1968	26 Jun 1970	
1187	Hellenic Pride	Cargo ship	(Greece) Hellenic Lines Ltd	18 Dec 1968	30 Jun 1971	
1188	Hellenic Star	Cargo ship	(Greece) Hellenic Lines Ltd	18 Dec 1968	21 Oct 1971	
1189	Hellenic Wave	Cargo ship	(Greece) Hellenic Lines Ltd	18 Dec 1968	16 Dec 1971	
1190	Hellenic Sun	Cargo ship	(Greece) Hellenic Lines Ltd	18 Dec 1968	24 Feb 1972	
1191	Hellenic Sea	Cargo ship	(Greece) Hellenic Lines Ltd	18 Dec 1968	28 Apr 1972	
1192	Hellenic Faith	Cargo ship	(Greece) Hellenic Lines Ltd	18 Dec 1968	7 Jun 1972	
1193	Pacific	Car and bulk carrier	(Sweden) Rederi AB Nordstjernan	12 Sep 1969	13 Jul 1971	
1194	Suecia	Car and bulk carrier	(Sweden) Rederi AB Nordstjernan	12 Sep 1969	20 Oct 1971	
1195	Kaipola		(Finland) Yhtyneet Paperitehtaat	15 Aug 1969	5 Aug 1971	
1196	Valkeakoski	Cargo ship	(Finland) Yhtyneet Paperitehtaat	15 Aug 1969	22 Jun 1972	
1197	Mont Royal	Roll-on/roll-off	(Sweden) Scand. Motorships AB	18 Aug 1969	16 Mar 1972	
1198	Mont Louis	Roll-on/roll-off	(France) Comp. Atlantique	18 Aug 1969	18 Sep 1972	
1199	Bore I	Passenger ship	(Finland) Silja Line	28 Aug 1969	15 Mar 1973	
1200	Tuira	Cargo ship	(Finland) Oulu Oy	15 Jan 1970	17 Nov 1972	
1201	Koiteli	Cargo ship	(Finland) Oulu Oy	15 Jan 1970	29 Dec 1972	
1202	Mont Larcher	Roll-on/roll-off	(France) Comp. Atlantique	31 Mar 1970	28 Apr 1972	
1203	Mont Morency	Roll-on/roll-off	(France) Comp. Atlantique	31 Mar 1970	15 Dec 1972	
1204	Hans Gutzeit	Roll-on/roll-off	(Finland) Merivienti Oy	26 May 1970	5 Sep 1972	
1205	Finn Fellow	Roll-on/roll-off	(Finland) Merivienti Oy	26 May 1970	21 May 1973	
1206	Neptune Emerald	Container ship	(Singapore) Neptune Orient Lines	18 Sep 1970	14 Apr 1973	
1207	Neptune Sapphire	Container ship	(Singapore) Neptune Orient Lines	18 Sep 1970	29 Jun 1973	
1208	Tamara	Container ship	(Sweden) Broströms rederier	11 Sep 1970	20 Feb 1974	
1209	Malmroos Monsoon	Container ship	(Sweden) Malmros Rederi	11 Sep 1970	11 Jun 1974	
1210	Nagara	Container ship	(Sweden) Malmros Rederi	11 Sep 1970	8 Oct 1974	
1211	Katynj	Cable layer	(Soviet Union) Sudoimport	29 Apr 1971	14 May 1974	
1212	Byelorussiya	Passenger ship	(Soviet Union) Sudoimport	9 Jun 1972	15 Jan 1975	
1213	Gruziya	Passenger ship	(Soviet Union) Sudoimport	9 Jun 1972	30 Jun 1975	
1214	Prinsessan Birgitta	Passenger ship	(Sweden) Rederi AB Ragne	10 Jul 1972	10 May 1974	
1215	Nyhorn	Chemical tanker	(Norway) Chr. Haaland Rederi	7 Feb 1973	14 Feb 1975	
1216	Bow Fagus	Chemical tanker	(Norway) Red. Odfjell AS	8 Mar 1973	18 Apr 1975	
1217	Nyholt	Chemical tanker	(Norway) Chr. Haaland Rederi	8 Mar 1973	26 May 1975	
1218	Bow Flower	Chemical tanker	(Norway) Red. Odfjell AS	19 Mar 1973	29 Aug 1975	
1219	Don Juan	Car carrier	(Sweden) Wallenius Rederier	3 Jul 1973	19 Dec 1975	
1220	Don Carlos	Car carrier	(Sweden) Wallenius Rederier	3 Jul 1973	30 Apr 1976	
1221	Azerbaydzhan	Passenger ship	(Soviet Union) Sudoimport	6 Jul 1973	18 Dec 1975	
1222	Kazakhstan	Passenger ship	(Soviet Union) Sudoimport	6 Jul 1973	23 Jun 1976	
1223	Kareliya	Passenger ship	(Soviet Union) Sudoimport	6 Jul 1973	15 Dec 1976	
1224	Messiniaki Anatoli	Tanker	(Greece) M. A. Karageorgis	28 Sep 1973	18 Feb 1977	
1225	Messiniaki Akti	Tanker	(Greece) M. A. Karageorgis	28 Sep 1973	5 Jul 1977	
1226	Pariata	Tanker	(Venezuela) Maraven SA	28 Sep 1973	19 Jan 1978	
1227	Caruao	Tanker	(Venezuela) Maraven SA	28 Sep 1973	19 Jan 1978	
1228	Messiniaki Avgi	Tanker	(Greece) M. A. Karageorgis	28 Sep 1973	10 Nov 1977	
1229	Gas Rising Sun	Gas tanker	Rising Sun Gas Carriers Corp. Japan	29 Apr 1974	18 Sep 1978	
1230	Berge Sisu	Gas tanker	(Norway) Sig. Bergesen & Co	29 Apr 1974	30 Nov 1978	
1231	Berge Sisar	Gas tanker	(Norway) Sig. Bergesen & Co	29 Apr 1974	26 Mar 1979	
1232	Berge Saga	Gas tanker	(Norway) Sig. Bergesen & Co	29 Apr 1974	27 Sep 1979	
1233	Golar Frost	Gas tanker	(Norway) Gotaas Larsen & Co	29 Apr 1974	11 Mar 1980	
1234	Berge Sund	Gas tanker	(Norway) Sig. Bergesen & Co	28 Jun 1974	13 Oct 1981	
1235	Berge Strand	Gas tanker	(Norway) Sig. Bergesen & Co	28 Jun 1974	26 May 1982	
1236	Tavda	Cable layer	(Soviet Union) Sudoimport	9 Jul 1974	6 Oct 1977	
1237	Inguri	Cable layer	(Soviet Union) Sudoimport	9 Jul 1974	12 May 1978	
1238	Tachira	Cargo ship	(Venezuela) C. A. Venezolana de Navigacion	26 Feb 1975	7 Dec 1976	
1239	Trujillo	Cargo ship	(Venezuela) C. A. Venezolana de Navigacion	26 Feb 1975	2 Jun 1977	
1240	Falcon	Cargo ship	(Venezuela) C. A. Venezolana de Navigacion	26 Feb 1975	22 Sep 1977	
1241	Aragua	Cargo ship	(Venezuela) C. A. Venezolana de Navigacion	26 Feb 1975	5 Jan 1978	
1242	Turella	Passenger ship	(Finland) SF Line Ab	17 Mar 1978	4 Jun 1979	
1243	Balder Turku	Supply vessel	(Norway) A.S. Balder Supply	9 Aug 1978	21 Jun 1979	
1244	Balder Vaasa	Supply vessel	(Norway) A.S. Balder Supply	9 Aug 1978	21 Sep 1979	
1245	Swan Ocean	Supply vessel	(Bermuda) Ceta Shipping Co	6 Sep 1978	28 Aug 1979	
1246	Kontula	Bulk carrier	(Finland) Etelä-Suomen Laiva Oy	9 Nov 1978	31 Jan 1980	
1247	Viking Saga	Passenger ship	(Finland) Rederi Ab Sally	22 Dec 1978	26 Jun 1980	
1248	Viking Song	Passenger ship	(Finland) Rederi Ab Sally	22 Dec 1978	29 Aug 1980	
1249	Rosella	Passenger ship	(Finland) SF Line Ab	18 Jan 1979	25 Apr 1980	
1250	Shearwater Aquamarine	Supply vessel	(United Kingdom) Shearwater Marine Ltd	6 Apr 1979	15 Apr 1981	
1251	Finlandia	Passenger ship	(Finland) FÅA	22 May 1979	30 Mar 1981	
1252	Silvia Regina	Passenger ship	(Finland) Oy Svea Line Ab	22 May 1979	10 Jun 1981	
1254	Parita	Tanker	(Finland) Oy Gustav Paulig Ab	3 Mar 1980	31 Dec 1981	
1255	Gogland	Dredger	(Soviet Union) Sudoimport	15 Feb 1980	31 May 1982	
1256	Norilsk	Cargo ship	(Soviet Union) Sudoimport	2 Jul 1980	13 Nov 1982	
1257	Tiksi	Cargo ship	(Soviet Union) Sudoimport	2 Jul 1980	8 Mar 1983	
1258	Igarka	Cargo ship	(Soviet Union) Sudoimport	2 Jul 1980	23 Feb 1983	
1259	Montshegorsk	Cargo ship	(Soviet Union) Sudoimport	2 Jul 1980	16 Jun 1983	
1260	Arkhangelsk	Cargo ship	(Soviet Union) Sudoimport	2 Jul 1980	14 Jul 1983	
1261	Kola	Cargo ship	(Soviet Union) Sudoimport	2 Jul 1980	25 Aug 1983	
1262	Al Mansur	Cruise ship	(Iraq) Ministry of Transportation	18 Sep 1980	26 Mar 1983	
1263	Yavire	Gas tanker	(Venezuela) Maraven S.A.	15 Nov 1981	3 Jun 1983	
1264	Paramacay	Gas tanker	(Venezuela) Maraven S.A.	15 Nov 1981	8 Sep 1983	
1265	Amderma	Cargo ship	(Soviet Union) Sudoimport	9 Sep 1981	15 Nov 1983	
1266	Kandalaksha	Cargo ship	(Soviet Union) Sudoimport	9 Sep 1981	9 Jan 1984	
1267	Nikel	Cargo ship	(Soviet Union) Sudoimport	9 Sep 1981	31 Mar 1984	
1268	Atrek	Supply vessel	(Soviet Union) Sudoimport	8 Sep 1981	25 Jan 1983	
1269	Andoga	Supply vessel	(Soviet Union) Sudoimport	8 Sep 1981	10 Feb 1983	
1270	Atmis	Supply vessel	(Soviet Union) Sudoimport	8 Sep 1981	31 Mar 1983	
1271	Aura	Supply vessel	(Soviet Union) Sudoimport	8 Sep 1981	6 Apr 1983	
1272	Höegh Dene	Cargo ship	(Norway) Leif Höegh & Co AS	30 Oct 1981	3 Feb 1984	
1273	Höegh Drake	Cargo ship	(Norway) Leif Höegh & Co AS	30 Oct 1981	22 May 1984	
1274	Höegh Dyke	Cargo ship	(Norway) Leif Höegh & Co AS	30 Oct 1981	14 Sep 1984	
1275	Leningradskij I	Dredger	(Soviet Union) Sudoimport	3 Dec 1981	25 Apr 1984	
1276	Leningradskij II	Dredger	(Soviet Union) Sudoimport	3 Dec 1981	13 Jun 1984	
1277	Titan 1	Recovery ship	(Soviet Union) Sudoimport	3 Dec 1981	25 Sep 1984	
1278	Titan 2	Recovery ship	(Soviet Union) Sudoimport	3 Dec 1981	31 Jan 1985	
1279	Titan 3	Recovery ship	(Soviet Union) Sudoimport	3 Dec 1981	30 Apr 1985	
1280	Kihu	Tanker	(Finland) Neste Oy	8 Mar 1982	10 Sep 1984	
1281	Tavi	Tanker	(Finland) Neste Oy	8 Mar 1982	28 Jan 1984	
1282	Jamal	Dredger	(Soviet Union) Sudoimport	27 Aug 1982	6 Jun 1985	
1283	Javaj	Dredger	(Soviet Union) Sudoimport	27 Aug 1982	6 Jun 1985	
1284	Stanislav Judin	Recovery ship	(Soviet Union) Sudoimport	12 Aug 1982	2 Aug 1985	
1285	Vajdagubskij	Dredger	(Soviet Union) Sudoimport	27 Jun 1984	23 Sep 1986	
1286	Mariella	Passenger ship	(Finland) SF Line Ab	15 Dec 1983	17 May 1985	
1287	Anabar	Dredger	(Soviet Union) Sudoimport	12 Apr 1984	27 Mar 1986	
1288	Indigirka	Dredger	(Soviet Union) Sudoimport	12 Apr 1984	30 Apr 1986	
1289	Titan 4	Recovery ship	(Soviet Union) Sudoimport	27 Jun 1984	14 Sep 1988	
1290	Olympia	Passenger ship	(Sweden) Rederi AB Slite	10 Sep 1984	18 Apr 1986	
1291		Tanker hull	(Norway) AS Fredrikstads Mek. Verkstad	18 Mar 1985	15 May 1986	
1292	Kronprins Harald	Passenger ship	(Norway) Jahre Line AS	13 Apr 1985	19 Mar 1987	
1293	Transshelf	Recovery ship	(Soviet Union) Sudoimport	23 Jul 1985	24 Mar 1987	
1294	Seaward	Passenger ship	(Norway) Norwegian Cruise Line	21 Jul 1986	16 May 1988	
1295	Anadyr	Barge recovery ship	(Soviet Union) Sudoimport	7 Jan 1987	28 Oct 1988	
1296	Royal Viking Sun	Passenger ship	(Norway) Kloster Cruise AS	27 Jan 1987	26 Nov 1988	
1297	Athena	Passenger ship	(Sweden) Rederi AB Slite	24 Feb 1987	17 Apr 1989	
1298	Kalypso	Passenger ship	(Sweden) Rederi AB Slite	31 Jul 1987	30 Apr 1990 (MY)	
1301	Silja Serenade	Passenger ship	(Finland) Oy Silja Line Ab	26 Oct 1987	15 Nov 1990 (MY)	
1302	Cinderella	Passenger ship	(Finland) Oy SF Line Ab	4 Jan 1988	29 Oct 1989 (*)	
1303	Svobodnyj	Tanker	(Soviet Union) Sudoimport	7 Jan 1987	3 May 1989	
1304	Petropavlovsk	Tanker	(Soviet Union) Sudoimport	7 Jan 1987	5 Sep 1989	
1305	Angarsk	Tanker	(Soviet Union) Sudoimport	7 Jan 1987		
1306	Lutshegorsk	Tanker	(Soviet Union) Sudoimport	7 Jan 1987		
1307	Roshtshino	Tanker	(Soviet Union) Sudoimport	7 Jan 1987		
1308	Shtokovo	Tanker	(Soviet Union) Sudoimport	7 Jan 1987		
1309	Silja Symphony	Passenger ship	(Finland) Oy Silja Line Ab	21 Mar 1988	30 May 1991 (MY)	
1310	Arsenyev	Tanker	(Soviet Union) Sudoimport	7 Jan 1987	20 Jun 1989	
1311	Guryev	Tanker	(Soviet Union) Sudoimport	7 Jan 1987		
1312	Royal Majesty	Passenger ship	(Sweden) Birka Line Ab / (United States) Dolphin Cruise Line	(3 May 1991, MY)	2 Jul 1991 (MY)	

== Sources ==
- von Knorring, Nils (1995). Aurajoen veistämöt ja telakat [Boat- and Shipyards along River Aura] (in Finnish). Espoo, Finland: Schildts Förlags Ab. ISBN 951-50-0735-6.
- Haavikko, Paavo (1984). Wärtsilä 1834–1984 (in Finnish). Oy Wärtsilä Ab. ISBN 951-99542-0-1.
