= Bergersen =

Bergersen is a surname. Notable people with the surname include:

- Birger Bergersen (1891–1977), Norwegian anatomist and politician for the Labour Party
- Fraser Bergersen FRS (1929–2011), New Zealand plant biologist
- Gregg Bergersen (born 1956), weapons systems policy analyst for the United States Defense Security Cooperation Agency
- Hans Bergersen Wergeland (1861–1931), Norwegian politician
- Ivar Bergersen Sælen (1855–1923), Norwegian Minister of Education and Church Affairs in 1923
- Per Bergersen (1960–1990), musician from Røros, Norway
- Roberto Bergersen (born 1976), American former professional basketball player
- Rolf Bergersen (1906–1966), Norwegian sport shooter, World Champion and Olympic competitor
- Thomas Bergersen (born 1980), Norwegian composer, co-founder of music production company Two Steps From Hell
- Tommy Bergersen (born 1972), Norwegian football coach and former football midfielder

== See also ==
- Mount Bergersen, large mountain rising to 3,170 m, standing at the west side of Byrdbreen in the Sor Rondane Mountains
- Bergesen (disambiguation)
