= Petter C. G. Sundt =

Norwegian shipping magnate and businessman

Petter Christian Grüner Sundt (9 April 1945 – 28 November 2007) was a Norwegian shipping magnate and businessman.

Together with his cousin Morten Sig. Bergesen, in 1976 he took over the leadership of the company Bergesen d.y. after his grandfather Sigval Bergesen the Younger retired for health reasons. As a result of that, other members of the family wanted to sell their shares in the company. Ten years later Morten Bergesen and Petter Sundt took over ownership control and listed the company. They controlled the company until they sold it to the Sohmen-Pao family in 2003. Sundt received two billion kr (approximately US$368 million) for his shares in Bergesen d.y.

In 1983 he was decorated as a Commander of the Order of the Lion of Finland, together with Brynjulf and Morits Skaugen and Gjert and Arne Wilhelmsen.

Sundt died of cancer in November 2007.
