= Sigval Bergesen =

Norwegian politician

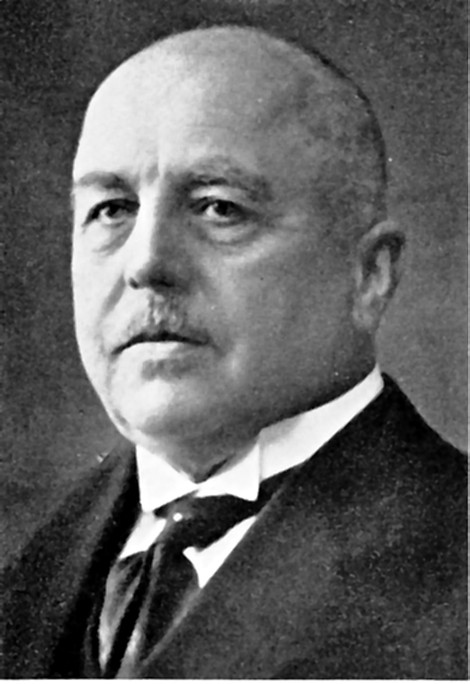
Berge Sigval Natanael Bergesen (1863–1956)

Berge Sigval Natanael Bergesen (3 April 1863 – 4 December 1956) was a Norwegian shipowner and industrialist who served as a member of the Norwegian Parliament .

Bergesen was born at Farsund in Lister og Mandal county, Norway. He was a son of Ole Bergesen (1832-1899) and Marthe Marie Sophie Soeborg Jensen (1830-1908). He completed middle school in Kristiansand in 1879 and then received a trade school education in Osnabrück, Germany. Between the years 1882–1887, he received experience with chartering and ship brokerage businesses in Germany and Britain. In 1887, he moved to Stavanger where he founded his own shipping company, Sigval Bergesen (not to be confused with Bergesen d.y. ASA, which was founded by his son Sigval). Over time, his fleet grew to become the city's largest.

Bergesen was member of the Parliament of Norway from 1903 to 1909. He also held several important board positions, among these chairman of the Norwegian America Line from 1929 to 1939.

A statue of Sigvald Bergesen is located at the railway station in Stavanger. It was structured by Norwegian artist Ottar Espeland and was unveiling June 7, 1953.

== Personal life ==
He was married in 1888 with Rachel Racine (1866-1936), daughter of the merchant Charles Samuel Racine (1826-1896) and Marie Berentsen (1835-1897). Bergesen was the father of Ole Bergesen and Sigval Bergesen, Jr. Through Ole he was a grandfather of Berge Sigval Natanael Bergesen. Through Sigval he was a great-grandfather of Morten Sigval Bergesen and Petter C. G. Sundt and Ole Bergesen.
