= Ole Bergesen (1916–1965) =

Norwegian politician

Ole Bergesen (22 August 1916 – 9 January 1965) was a Norwegian politician for the Conservative Party.

He was born in Stavanger as a son of Ole Bergesen (1891–1955) and Ingrid Wetteland (1891–1962). He was a great-grandson of Ole Bergesen, grandson of Sigval Bergesen, nephew of Sigval Bergesen Jr. and brother of Berge Sigval Natanael Bergesen.

He was elected to the Parliament of Norway from Rogaland in 1954, and was re-elected on two occasions. He died before his third term had finished, and was replaced by Peter Torleivson Molaug.
