= Borgersen =

Borgersen is a surname. Notable people with the surname include:

- Bård Borgersen (born 1972), Norwegian football defender
- Christopher Borgersen Hoen (1767–1845), Norwegian farmer and politician
- Kristine Lunde-Borgersen (born 1980), Norwegian handballer
- Morten Borgersen (born 1950), Norwegian actor, theatre instructor and theatre director
- Odd Borgersen (born 1980), Norwegian long track speed skater
- Reidar Borgersen (born 1980), Norwegian former racing cyclist

== See also ==
- Bergeforsen
- Bergesen (disambiguation)
- Birgersson
- Bürgersinn
