= MS Berge Istra =

Ship built in 1972

MS Berge Istra was a ship owned by Norwegian shipping company Sig.ö Bergesen d.y. and registered in Liberia, an ore-bulk-oil carrier with 227,550 tonnes deadweight (DWT). She was carrying ore from Brazil to Japan, and returning with crude oil from the Persian Gulf to Europe or America. The ship had build number 296 at the Uljanik shipyard in the port city Pula in then SFR Yugoslavia (today Croatia) where it was built in 1972.

The ship was en route from Tubarão in Brazil to Japan with iron ore when contact was lost with the vessel in the Pacific (near the island of Mindanao, Philippines), the last contact was on December 30, 1975. After one week, on January 7, 1976, the ship was reported missing, but the ensuing search operation yielded no results and was called off on January 16 of that year. Thirty people lost their lives. Two days later, on January 18, Spanish citizens Imeldo Barreto León (41) and Epifanio López (39), were picked up by Japanese fishermen, having survived 20 days on a raft. López and León recounted that they had been painting the ship's bow when it had been shaken by a series of explosions and had gone down in a matter of a few seconds. After struggling to escape the sinking ship's suction, León had managed to climb onto the raft, which had floated free of the ship, and had hauled aboard the unconscious López.

MS Berge Istra was like its sister ship MS Berge Vanga which disappeared under similar circumstances four years later. Even 30 years later, the shipping company maintained secrecy with regard to the cause of the accidents. During an interview in Norwegian newspaper Dagbladet in January 2011, the retired Bergesen captain Johnny Eilers gave his view on what happened: The inert (neutral gas) systems were often unreliable those days, and many officers lacked education in how to measure gas levels. Berge Istra was loaded with ore in the main holds. But the wingtanks were not cleaned after the previous cargo of oil, thus producing oil vapor. Also the deck water seal was unreliable in heavy seas, allowing this vapor to enter the inert gas system and generator. That generator would be started on their way east, as Japan demanded inerted wingtanks on arrival. Starting the generator would then cause the “whole deck to open up”, just as the two survivors had explained it did. Thus the Berge Istra and Berge Vanga disasters.
