= Bergesen =

Bergesen may refer to:

- Bergesen (surname)
- Bergesen Island, Nunavut, Canada
- Bergesen d.y., a Norwegian shipping company
