= Uljanik =

Shipbuilding company in Pula, Croatia

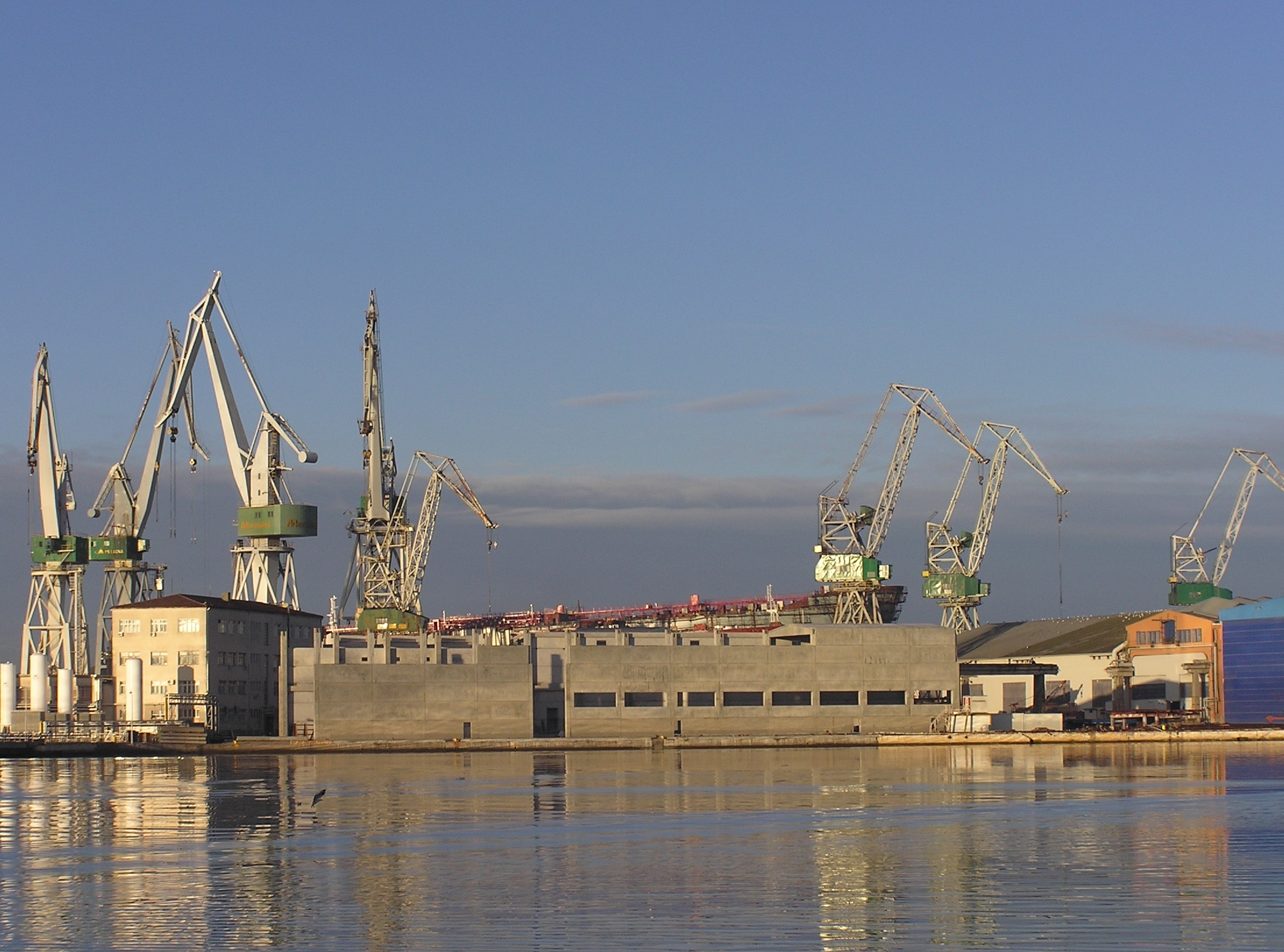
- Type: public, active
- Industry: Shipbuilding, engineering
- Founded: 1856, Pula, Austrian Empire
- Headquarters: Pula, Croatia
- Products: Ships, machinery
- Number of employees: 391
- Website: www.uljanik.hr

Uljanik is a shipbuilding company in Pula, Croatia.

== History ==
Uljanik was founded in 1856, in the carefully selected bay of Pula as a shipyard of the Austro-Venetian Navy (from 1867 to 1918 Austro-Hungarian Navy). The foundation stone was laid on December 9 by Empress Elisabeth of Austria so, this date is celebrated as the anniversary of the shipyard, one of the oldest operational shipyards in the world. Almost two years after laying the foundation stone – on October 5, 1858, the first ship – SMS Kaiser – having a deadweight of 5,194 tonnes, was launched from the berth. The construction of 55 ships of various type for the Austro-Hungarian fleet having a total deadweight of 53,588 tonnes followed.

It was named after an islet on which there used to grow olive trees while at present the steel and hull fabrication workshops are situated there. One olive tree has been preserved as a symbol.

In the long period of continuous work, the shipyard has passed through various development times. From 1918 to 1943 while under Italian control it was engaged in repairs, docking and cutting of old ships. After the Italian armistice in September 1943 it was taken over by German naval forces. From 1947 it was being renovated under the Republic of Yugoslavia. It continued with the docking, reconstructions and repair of ships, while the first new build ship delivered in 1951. With VLCC-s the shipyard developed the technology of building the hull in two parts and then joining them afloat. In this way, in the period from 1972 to 1976 there were built 11 ships and, among them the biggest ones, Tarfala of 275,000 dwt for the Stockholm based company Trafialtiebolaget Grangesberg, and Kanchenjunga of 277,120 tonne dead-weight delivered to the Indian company – The Shipping Corporation of India in 1975.

In the Republic of Croatia, formed during the Croatian War of Independence, it became a joint-stock company, continues with the shipbuilding production of different and special ships and in the second half of 1998, it enters the period of great technological rebuilding.

In the period from 1947 to the end of 1998, Uljanik delivered 194 newbuildings, totalling more than 6 million DWT, to buyers from all continents. Uljanik designs, constructs and builds all types of ships i.e. ships for transportation of oil and oil products, bulk cargoes, containers, trucks, rail-carriages, cars, passengers.

In 2015, Canadian shipping company Algoma Central ordered a total of five Equinox-class freighters from the company.

In December 2016, after missing payroll, company asked help from the Croatian government.

In January 2018, the shipyard floated out the six-star 228-passenger Scenic Eclipse that is expected to enter service later in the year.

After the Uljanik Group filed for bankruptcy in mid-2019, it was decided in January 2020 to liquidate the parent company, with the shipyard site and inventory initially being retained. There is a newly established company in Pula carrying the similar name: Uljanik-Brodogradnja 1856 d.o.o.

== Notable ships constructed in Uljanik ==
- MS Berge Vanga
- MS Berge Istra
- SMS Kaiser (1858)
- Scenic Eclipse

== See also ==
- 3. Maj
- Viktor Lenac Shipyard
- Uljanik plovidba – Uljanik Shipmanagement
- List of companies of the Socialist Federal Republic of Yugoslavia
