= Morten Sigval Bergesen =

Norwegian ship-owner

Morten Sigval Bergesen (born 2 June 1951) is a Norwegian ship-owner.

He was born in Stockholm as a grandson of Sigval Bergesen the Younger. He was also a great-grandson of Sigval Bergesen, grandnephew of Ole Bergesen and cousin of Petter C. G. Sundt. He was a co-owner of his grandfather's shipping company Bergesen d.y. from 1976 together with Petter C. G. Sundt. He sold his share in 2003.
