= MS Berge Vanga =

Missing ship

History
- Name: MS Berge Vanga
- Owner: Bergesen d.y.
- Port of registry: Liberia
- Builder: Uljanik Shipyard, Pula, Croatia
- Launched: 1974
- Identification: IMO number: 7367536
- Fate: Disappeared, presumed sunk, South Atlantic, 29 October 1979

General characteristics
- Type: Ore-bulk-oil carrier
- Tonnage: 115,426 GT; 231,568 DWT
- Beam: 50.07 m (164.3 ft)
- Draught: 20.416 m (66.98 ft)
- Installed power: 35,000 Brake horsepower
- Propulsion: 2 x Burmeister & Wain diesel engines

MS Berge Vanga was an ore-bulk-oil carrier with 227,912 tonnes deadweight (DWT). The ship was owned by Norwegian shipping company Sig. Bergesen d.y. and registered in Liberia. The ship had build number 300 at the Uljanik shipyard in the port city Pula in then SFR Yugoslavia (today Croatia) where it was built in 1974.

The ship was en route from Brazil to Japan with iron ore when contact was lost with the vessel in the South Atlantic from 29 October 1979. The ship vanished and the ensuing search operation yielded no results. Forty people lost their lives.

Some debris that resembles parts from the tanker was found northwest of Tristan da Cunha island, but no traces of the crew. Still very little is known about the disaster, and the hearing after the accident was held behind closed doors. The principal theory holds that the cause could have been explosions caused by oil residue in the cargo compartments. MS Berge Vanga was, like its sister ship MS Berge Istra which exploded and sank four years earlier with the loss of all but two of her crew, a ship which could transport both oil and iron ore.
