= Finnish war reparations to the Soviet Union =

War reparations

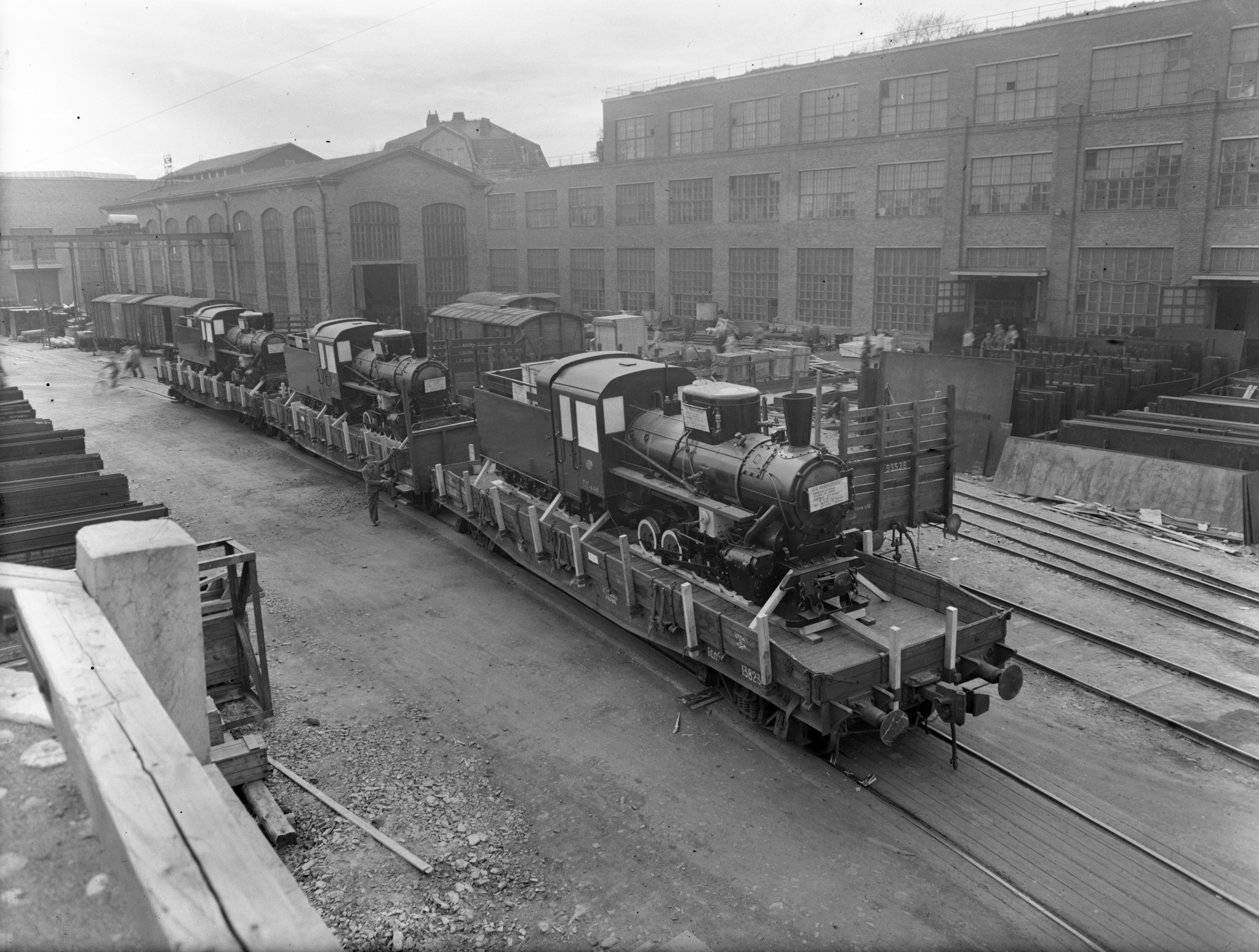
Tampella steam engines being delivered as war reparations

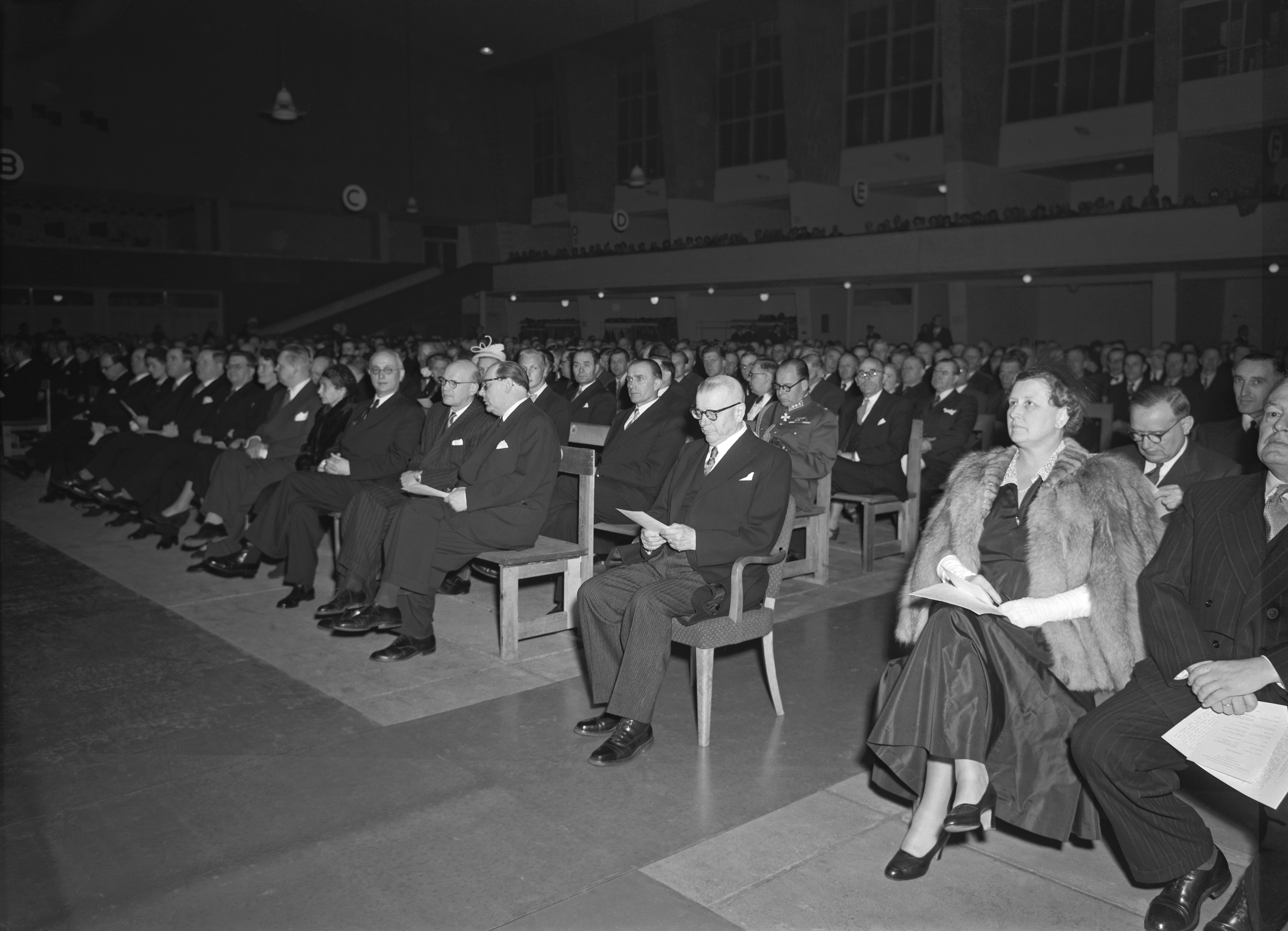
Celebration of the final Finnish war reparations deliveries in the Exhibition Hall in Helsinki on September 23, 1952. Finnish president J. K. Paasikivi is sitting in the middle of the first row.

War reparations of Finland to the Soviet Union were originally worth US$300,000,000 at 1938 prices (equivalent to US$6.86 billion in 2025). Finland agreed to pay the reparations in the Moscow Armistice signed on 19 September 1944. The protocol to determine more precisely the war reparations to the Soviet Union was signed in December 1944, by the prime minister Juho Kusti Paasikivi and the chairman of the Allied Control Commission for controlling the Moscow Armistice in Helsinki, Andrei Zhdanov.

Finland was originally obliged to pay $300,000,000 in gold, to be paid over six years in the form of ships and machinery. The Soviet Union agreed to prolong the payment period from six to eight years in late 1945. In summer 1948 the sum was cut to $226,500,000 (equivalent to US$5.18 billion in 2025). The last dispatched train carrying the war reparations payments crossed the border between Finland and the Soviet Union on 18 September 1952 at the Vainikkala railway border station. Approximately 340,000 railway wagonloads were needed to deliver all reparations.

The authority responsible for deliveries and also organising production agreements with the manufacturers according to the protocols was Sotakorvausteollisuuden valtuuskunta, the delegation of the war reparations industry. The preliminary committee was established on 9 October 1944. It was chaired by the industrialist Walter Gräsbeck, with Jaakko Rautanen as secretary, and Gunnar Jaatinen, Juho Jännes, Johan Nykopp, Arno Solin, and Wilhelm Wahlforss as members.

== Some deliveries ==
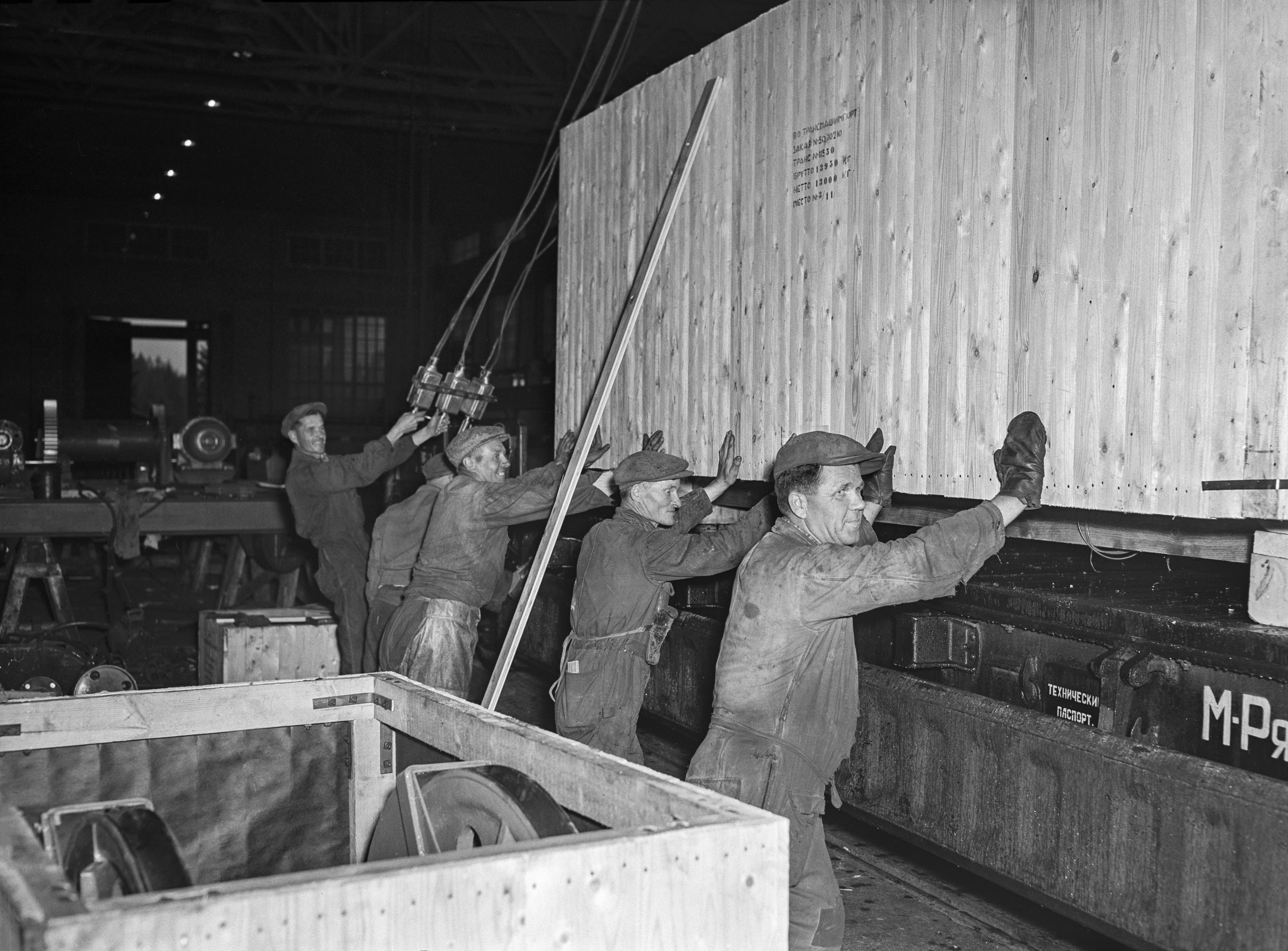
Loading of the last war reparation train at Kone Ltd's workshop in Hyvinkää 28.8.1952

=== Electrical ===
- 52,500 electric engines, 1,140 transformational stations, and 30 mills with power stations

=== Locomotives ===
Lokomo, together with Tampella, produced 525 narrow-gauge locomotives, the PT-4 series.

==== Valmet ====
- Move 21, a railway engine for narrow 750 mm gauge, 76 units produced, 66 units delivered to the Soviet Union. Valmet sold the remaining 10 units to Saalasti Engineering, which sold them to the private narrow-gauge railways in Finland. Five of them were converted to 5-feet-gauge (1524 mm) museum exhibit, Jokioinen Museum Railway

=== Vessels ===
Finland delivered 619 vessels to the Soviet Union, of which 119 were used. 104 vessels were commercial ones.

==== Icebreakers ====
- SS Turso, a harbour icebreaker originally built for Finnish use, 8 February 1945 to the Soviet Union in Leningrad, bought back to Finland 2004 by Satamajäänsärkijä S/S Turso registered society, 2006 in Hietalahti harbour, Helsinki

The delivery was followed by a class of similar icebreakers.

- State-owned steam-powered icebreakers Jääkarhu and Voima

==== Schooners ====
All the schooners were mainly 300-dead-weight-tonne schooners, of which 91 were delivered to the Soviet Union.

==== Ship industry ====
- 300-dead-weight-tonne ocean three-masted schooners with a 225 hp June Munktell diesel engines or Valmet Linnavuori licence production, 45 units, built by Laivateollisuus in Turku
- non-magnetic research schooner Zarya
- One of the schooners, Vega, is a museum in Jakobstad. Vega was written off in 1979, and it was moved to a building berth in 1986. The Estonian Maritime Museum had a restoration project, but the work did not start. The schooner was poorly protected, and its condition began to worsen. The Finns planned to save the Vega, but the plan failed. Pietarsaaren Vanha Satama Oy decided to establish a Vega foundation, which was registered on 3 June 1996.

==== F. W. Hollming docks ====
- 300-dead-weight-tonne ocean three-masted schooners with 225 hp engines, 34 units, in Rauma, First keel laying, 15 June 1946.

==== August Eklöf docks ====
- 300-dead-weight-tonne ocean three-masted schooners with 225 hp engines, seven units, in Porvoo.

=== Wooden houses ===
==== Puutalo ====
To deliver the required number of wooden houses to the Soviet Union, a joint venture, Puutalo Oy, was established. The last delivery of wooden houses took place on 28 January 1948. The deliveries started on 22 December 1944. Altogether, the floor area of the delivered wooden houses was 840,000 m^{2}. The war reparations themselves included 177,000 m^{2} as compensation for German property that Finland did not hand over to the Soviet Union. This consisted of 37,208 railway wagons, which as a single train would have been 335 km long.

- 522 wooden houses, Oulu company Pateniemi saw mill

== See also ==
- Finnish maritime cluster
