= Gjert Wilhelmsen =

Norwegian shipowner (1927–2018)

- Born: 12 February 1927; Oslo, Norway
- Died: 28 February 2018 (aged 91)
- Occupation: Shipowner
- Relatives: Arne Wilhelmsen (brother)
- Awards: Order of St. Olav

Gjert Wilhelmsen (12 February 1927 – 28 February 2018) was a Norwegian shipowner.

He was born in Oslo to shipowner Anders Wilhelmsen and Aslaug Gjertsen, and was a brother of Arne Wilhelmsen. He was educated at the Norwegian Institute of Technology, and was technical director and eventually co-owner of the family company Anders Wilhelmsen AS. Wilhelmsen has held central positions at DNV, the Norwegian Society for Sea Rescue, the Norwegian Shipowners' Association, and the Norwegian Maritime Museum. He was decorated Commander of the Order of St. Olav in 2005.
