= Arne Wilhelmsen =

Norwegian businessman (1929–2020)

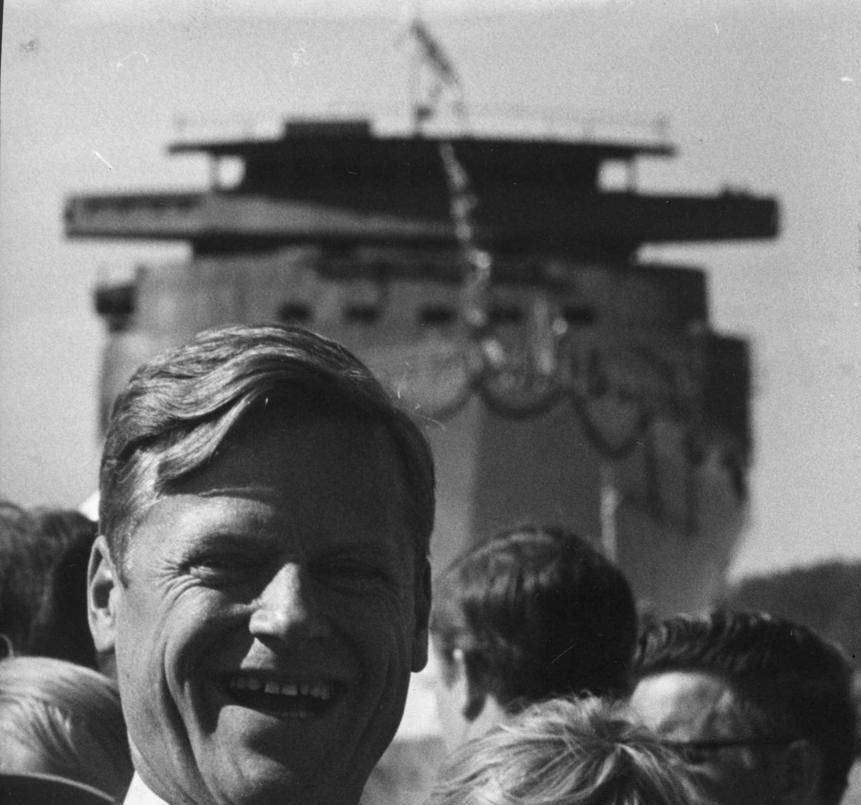
- Wilhelmsen in 1970
- Born: 15 June 1929
- Died: 11 April 2020 (aged 90); Palma de Mallorca, Spain
- Education: Harvard University
- Occupation: Businessman
- Known for: Co-founder of Royal Caribbean Cruises
- Spouse: Married
- Children: 3
- Relatives: Gjert Wilhelmsen (brother)

Arne Wilhelmsen (15 June 1929 – 11 April 2020) was a Norwegian billionaire businessman, the co-founder of Royal Caribbean Cruises.

Wilhelmsen was born in June 1929, and earned a bachelor's degree and MBA from Harvard University.

When he died, his net worth was estimated at US$1.5 billion.

Wilhelmsen was married, with three children and lived in Oslo, Norway. He died on 11 April 2020, in Palma de Mallorca, Spain. He was 90.
