= Sigval Bergesen the Younger =

Norwegian shipping magnate

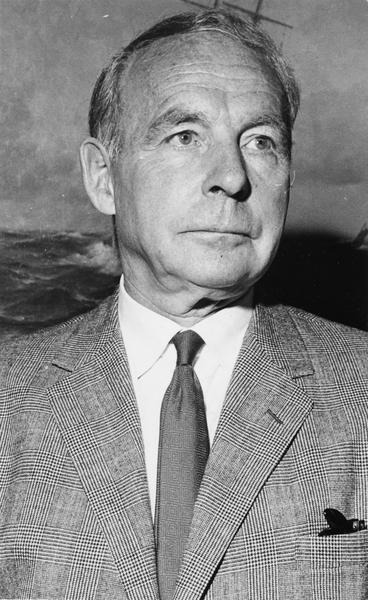
Sigval Bergesen d.y., 1967

Sigval Bergesen d.y. (27 April 1893 – 7 May 1980) was one of Norway’s leading shipping magnates and industrial entrepreneurs.

== Personal life ==
He was born in Stavanger as a son of Sigval Bergesen (1863–1956), who was also a shipping magnate, and Rachel Racine (1866–1936). He was a grandson of Ole Bergesen, brother of Ole Bergesen and uncle of Berge Sigval Natanael Bergesen and Ole Bergesen. He was a maternal grandfather of Morten Sigval Bergesen and Petter C. G. Sundt.

He was married twice; first to Ingerid Sømme (1895–1980) from December 1916 to 1945. She was a sister of Iacob Dybwad Sømme and Sven Sømme. From 1945 he was married to Nanki de Fekete (1903–1983), a former wife of Emil Lie.

== Career ==
In 1935 he broke with his father to form his own company, Bergesen d.y. The same year he bought the tanker President de Vogue (renamed Bergesund), in 1937 Charles Racine and in 1939 Anders Jahre (renamed Bergeland). By the time of the war he then had three major tankers, though Charles Racine was hit by torpedoes and destroyed in 1942. Bergesen used the war to position himself in the market, and by 1950 he had four ships in his fleet, by 1955 seven, and 16 by 1970.

In 1942 he also took control of Rosenberg Mekaniske Verksted, a major Norwegian shipyard. Rosenberg became a major part of Bergesen's industrial empire, and by the time it was sold to Kværner in 1970, 19 ships had been built there. By then Bergesen was one of the largest shipping companies in the world.

Bergesen was intimately involved in company affairs until an old age, but in 1976 he was forced to retire for medical reasons. Management of the company was handed over to his two grandchildren, Petter C. G. Sundt and Morten Sigval Bergesen. He had then built up a fleet totaling seven million metric tons dead weight.
