= Indicator net =

Nets used to entangle U-boats

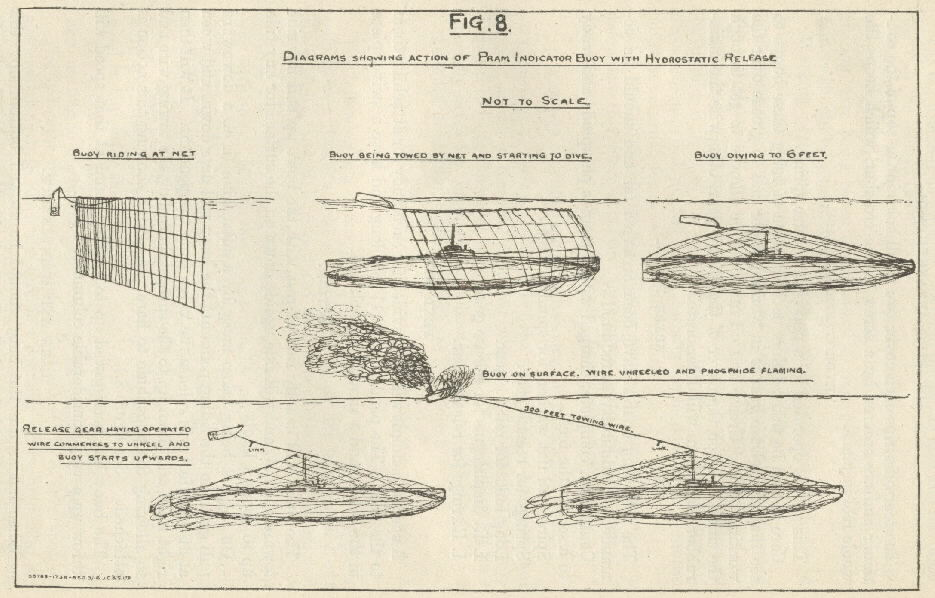
Diagram showing the operation of an indicator net. The entanglement of the submarine causes a flare to automatically light on a buoy attached to the net. Office of Naval Intelligence (1917)

Constructed using light steel nets, indicator nets were often anchored at various depths to the sea bed around Allied naval bases during both world wars. They were intended to entangle U-boat traffic of the enemy, even though the submarines often managed to disentangle themselves and escape before being blown up by depth charges.

Predominantly deployed by the Royal Navy as a means of discouraging enemy submarines from entering Allied waters, indicator nets were used extensively during World War I. Individual nets were sometimes as much as 100 metres (330 ft) in length. Instead of being used as the sole anti-submarine measure, indicator nets were often mixed with extensive minefields and patrolling warships. Sometimes mines were attached directly to the nets, thus reducing submarine survival chances. After a submarine became entangled in the net, a marker buoy attached to the net drifted along the water's surface indicating an enemy below. The first example of indicator nets causing the destruction of a U-boat occurred at Dover when the U-8 became entangled on March 4, 1915.

The British also used indicator nets attached to converted fishing boats. The boats were armed with guns and depth charges to attack any submarine that became entangled in their net. A number of these boats were deployed in the Mediterranean as part of the Otranto Barrage, to block the Strait of Otranto. On 12 May 1917, the Austro-Hungarian submarine SM U-6 was entangled in one of the nets. The captain surfaced in an attempt to cut the net free and the surfaced submarine was subjected to ineffectual gunfire from the fishing boats. The submarine was scuttled as its propellers had been fouled by the net and escape was impossible. All the crew were rescued.

The British continued to develop indicator nets between the world wars, though the Americans did not. In 1939, the British shared their expertise with the United States Navy. Before and during the attack on Pearl Harbor, Japanese midget submarines were able to enter the inner harbor via an open gate and avoid the submarine nets. The standard submarine net at Pearl Harbor consisted of 300 foot panels of 1 inch mesh rope with 8 foot diagonal openings. The midget submarines were designed to penetrate this type of net with features including a small size, net cutters and a tail with no projections which would snag the net. After the attack, a light indicator net was deployed at Pearl Harbor.

In the 21st century, the rising use of unmanned surface vehicles and unmanned underwater vehicles has brought indicator nets back into consideration as a defensive strategy.

== See also ==
- Anti-submarine indicator loop
