= Gregg Bergersen =

American spy for China (born 1956)

Gregg William Bergersen (born September 1, 1956) was a weapons systems policy analyst for the United States Defense Security Cooperation Agency. A director of C4ISR programs, he was found guilty of spying for the People's Republic of China.

A resident of Alexandria, Virginia, Bergersen sold classified defense information to Tai Shen Kuo and Yu Xin Kang, naturalized citizens from Taiwan. Kuo was conspirated as New Orleans furniture salesman. Kuo convinced Bergersen that the information would be given to Taiwan, but then forwarded the information to the PRC government. The data outlined all planned sales of weapons and military technology to Taiwan for the next five years.

In 11 February, 2008, Bergersen was arrested along with Kuo and Kang. The trial was held in Eastern District of Virginia, and led by Ryan Fayhee, a Trial Attorney and, then, an officer of DOJ National Security Division, W. Neil Hammerstrom Jr. and Aaron Zebley, Assistant Attorneys. Bergersen was sentenced to 57 months in prison and Kuo received 16 years in prison.

== See also ==
- Chinese intelligence operations in the United States
