= Ore-bulk-oil carrier =

Type of bulk cargo ship

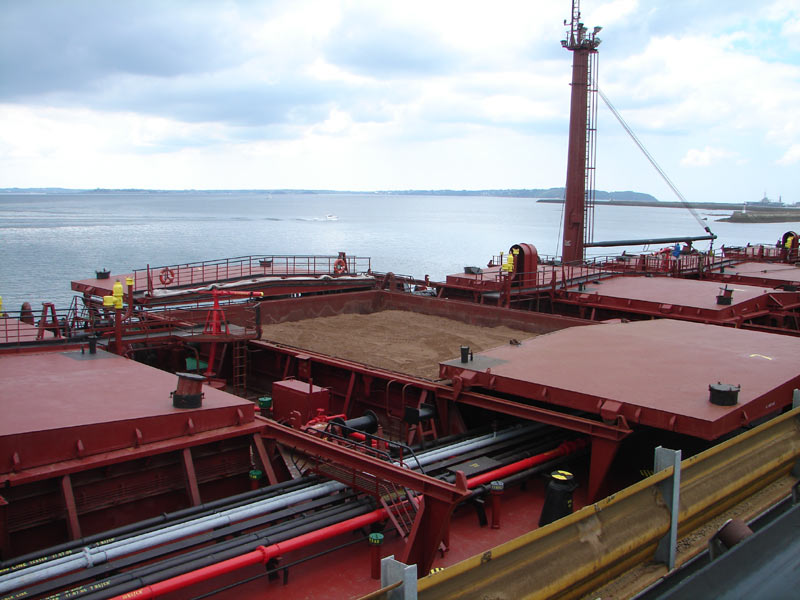
The OBO-carrier Maya. The picture is showing both the cargo hold hatches used for bulk and the pipes used for oil

An ore-bulk-oil carrier, also known as combination carrier or OBO, is a ship designed to be capable of carrying wet or dry cargoes. The idea is to reduce the number of empty (ballast) voyages, in which large ships only carry a cargo one way and return empty for another. These are a feature of the larger bulk trades (e.g. crude oil from the Middle East, iron ore and coal from Australia, South Africa and Brazil).

The Russian word for "ore-bulk-oil carrier", nefterudovoz (нефтерудовоз, literally "oil/ore carrier"), in combination with a number, is often used as a proper name for a ship, e.g. Nefterudovoz-51M.

== History ==
The idea of the OBO was that it would function as a tanker when the tanker markets were good and a bulk/ore carrier when those markets were good. It would also be able to take "wet" cargo (oil) one way and "dry" cargo (bulk cargoes or ore) the other way, thus reducing the time it had to sail in ballast (i.e. empty).

The first OBO carrier was the G. Harrison Smith, launched July 12, 1921 at Sparrows Point, albeit each of the two cargoes was carried in separate compartments with the ore hold embedded in the oil tanks on the side and below.

The first OBO carrier was the Naess Norseman, built at A. G. Weser for the company Norness Shipping, controlled by the Norwegian shipowner Erling Dekke Næss. Næss and his chief naval architect Thoralf Magnus Karlsen were instrumental in conceiving the new type of vessel. Naess Norseman was delivered in November 1965 and was 250 m (820 ft) long with a beam of 31.6 m (104 ft), a draft of 13.5 m (44 ft), and a gross register tonnage of 37,965 tonnes.

OBO carriers quickly became popular among shipowners around the world and as of 2021 several hundred such vessels have been built. The OBO carrier had its glory days in the early 1970s. However, in the 1980s, it became clear that the type required more maintenance than other vessels, as it was expensive to "switch" from wet to dry cargoes, and it took valuable time. If the vessel had carried oil, it could switch to carrying ore or other dirty bulk cargoes, but not grain or other clean bulk cargoes. As the 1970s cohort of OBO carriers aged, most of them switched to being used either as pure tankers or as pure ore carriers.

By 2021, OBO carriers were no longer as common as they were in the 1970s and 80s. With few of them being ordered after the 1980s, most existing vessels aged past their design lifetime and no longer exist. Some shipowners continued to support the OBO carrier concept and its trading flexibility. SKS, part of the Kristian Gerhard Jebsen Group, is today operating the largest OBO-fleet in the world consisting of 10 OBO carriers. The latest OBO carrier in the fleet, D Whale, was delivered from Hyundai Heavy Industries. The design of these vessels has been significantly improved compared to the vessels made in the 1970s and all problems which were related to the OBO carrier concept — including many that were common amongst tankers at that time — have been dealt with.

In the 1990s, a smaller number of OBOs from 70,000 tonnes deadweight (DWT) to 100,000 tonnes deadweight (DWT) were built for Danish and Norwegian shipowners. A fleet of smaller, "river-sized" (several thousand tonnes) ore-bulk-oil carriers have also been used for some decades on European Russia's waterways, primarily by Volgotanker.

== Accidents ==
In September 1980, the MV Derbyshire (180,000 t DWT), carrying a cargo of iron ore from Sept-Îles, Canada to Japan, sank in a Pacific typhoon, becoming the largest British ship ever lost at sea. The loss of the Derbyshire was found to be due to water ingress in the forward part of the ship, subsequent to which IMO rules were changed to require higher hatch strengths for forward hatches to ensure greater resistance to large waves coming over the forecastle (which itself had become less common in ship designs).

== See also ==
- MS Berge Istra
- MS Berge Vanga
- MV Derbyshire
