= Juho Jännes =

Finnish agricultural politician

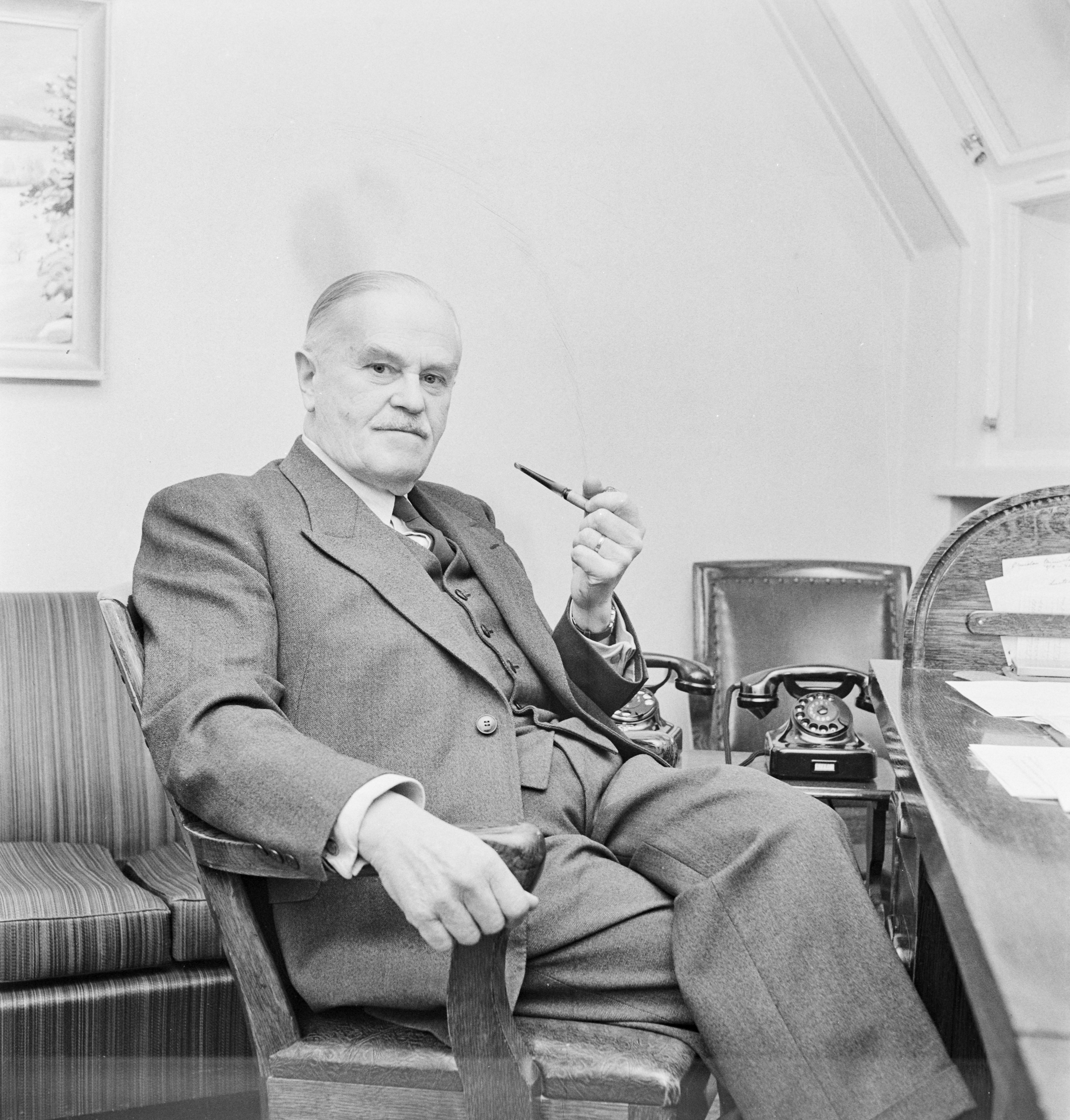
Juho Jännes in the 1950s.

Juho Kaarle Jännes (until 1906 Genetz), (28 July 1880 - 26 January 1964) was a Finnish agricultural politician who served as the first chairman of the Finnish Agricultural Producers' Union from 1917 to 1918 and 1923 to 1955.

Jännes was born in Hämeenlinna, the son of professor and senator Arvid Genetz and Julia Arppe. Genetz, fennoman used pen name Arvid Jännes and his children translated their last name to Jännes.

Juho Jännes undergraduate from the Helsinki Finnish School in 1898 and studied physics and chemistry at the University of Helsinki.

He graduated as a Bachelor of Philosophy and a Master's degree in 1903. Jännes became acquainted with agricultural sciences performing postgraduate studies in Germany. He inherited the estate of Ahtiala in Lohja, but he did not have any personal contact with the farm.

Between 1908 and 1918 Jännes acted as the rector of Helsinki Agricultural Lyceum, for which he was called by Hannes Gebhard. In 1917 Jännes graduated as a Licentiate of Philosophy and later became a doctorate in the following year.

Jännes was chairman of SOK from 1916 to 1917, when he failed to prevent the division of the co-operative movement.

When the Finnish Federation of Agricultural Producers was founded in 1917, Jännes was elected as the first chairman of the delegation.

The membership of the Organization was initially small and its influence was based on the expertise of management personnel. Jännes remained a relatively distant person to the members of Agricultural Producers' Union.

At the start of the Finnish Foreign Service, Jännes was appointed to the 1918 Delegation Counselor and the Chairman of the Trade Commission in Berlin. Between 1919 and 1920 he served as envoy to Berlin. President K. J. Ståhlberg fired him after the arms trade deals between Finnish Ministry of War and Germany which had generated an encrypted scandal.

After returning to Finland, Jännes founded a gardening and seedling store in the mansion of Ahtiala.

Jännes returned to the leadership of the Agricultural Producers' Union's delegation in 1923.

From 1935, the chairman of the board was the title. He was also sometimes appointed as the Chief Executive of the Agricultural Board of Directors but was not assigned to the post.

After the war, Agricultural Producers' Union and Jännes in its leadership were reluctant to surrender finished fields to the Karelian refugees.

The Pellonraivaus Oy was founded in 1940 on the suggestion of the fence in order to promote the clearing of the new lands. After the war, the membership of the Agricultural Producers' Union expanded considerably and the operation became more brisk. Jännes did not give up on the chair until 1955. He also commissioned Agricultural Producers' Union's research on agriculture, served by the Nordic Council of Ministers for Agriculture (NBC) and was active in the farming industry.

In addition to the agricultural organizations, Jännes had plenty of other trusts. He was a longtime chairman of the Board of Governors of the Finnish Broadcasting Company, chairman of the Board of the Laboratory for Agricultural Chemistry in 1939-1954 and was a member of the National Coalition Party's Party Confederation in 1929-1942. He was also one of the founders of Airam, who produced electricity lamps and chairman of the board of directors from 1921 to 1931 and again since 1948.

Jännes received the title of professor in 1948. He died in Helsinki.

Juho Jännes was married to Toini Jännes, President of the Finnish Armed Forces Association, o.s. Liljeström (1884-1942). Their children were Heli Virkkunen, Professor Lauri Jännes, Garden Architect Jussi Jännes and printmaker Lea Ignatius. His brother was actor Paavo Jännes and his sister-in-law poet Saima Harmaja and a poet of his sister-in-law Saima Harmaja.
