= Ole Bergesen (1832–1899) =

Norwegian priest and politician

Ole Bergesen (13 November 1832 – 8 May 1899) was a Norwegian priest and politician.

Bergesen was born in Hetland in Rogaland, Norway. Trained in the ministry, he worked as a catechist in Farsund, chaplain at Hetland Church (1869-1873), vicar of Brevik Church (1873-1880) and assistant priest in Kristiansand Church (1880-1882). He was assistant priest (1882-1888), priest (1888-1889) and dean at the Stavanger Cathedral (1889-1899).

He was elected to the Parliament of Norway from Brevik in 1874, and was re-elected in 1877.

He was the father of Sigval Bergesen, paternal grandfather of Ole Bergesen and Sigval Bergesen, Jr., and through Ole a great-grandfather of Berge Sigval Natanael Bergesen.
