= Ole Bergesen (1891–1955) =

Norwegian ship-owner

Ole Bergesen (1891 – 1955) was a Norwegian ship-owner.

He was born in Stavanger as a son of Sigval Bergesen. He was a grandson of Ole Bergesen and brother of Sigval Bergesen, Jr., and father of Berge Sigval Natanael Bergesen and Ole Bergesen.

He was a co-owner of his father's shipping company from 1918 and sole owner from 1937. From 1948 he was again a co-owner, having let his son Berge Sigval Natanael Bergesen on board. In 1953 another son Charles Racine Bergesen was given co-ownership.
