= Berge Sigval Natanael Bergesen =

Norwegian ship owner (1914–1965)

Berge Sigval Natanael Bergesen (6 September 1914 – 10 July 1965) was a Norwegian ship-owner.

He was born in Stavanger as a son of Ole Bergesen. He was a great-grandson of Ole Bergesen, grandson of Sigval Bergesen, nephew of Sigval Bergesen, Jr. and brother of Ole Bergesen. He was a co-owner of his father's shipping company from 1948 to his death.
