= Bergesen d.y. =

Former Norwegian shipping company

Bergesen d.y. ASA
- Industry: Shipping
- Founded: 1935
- Defunct: 2003
- Fate: Merger
- Successor: BW Group
- Headquarters: Oslo, Norway
- Key people: Sigval Bergesen d.y.

Bergesen d.y. ASA was a Norwegian shipping company, and one of the world's largest.

The company was founded by Sigval Bergesen d.y. (1893–1980). He was the son of Sigval Bergesen, who was also a shipping magnate, but in 1935 he broke with his father to form his own company. The same year he bought the tanker President de Vogue (renamed Bergesund), in 1937 Charles Racine and in 1939 Anders Jahre (renamed Bergeland). By the time of the war he then had three major tankers, though Charles Racine was hit by torpedoes and destroyed in 1942. Bergesen used the war to position himself in the market, and by 1950 he had four ships in his fleet, by 1955 the fleet had reached seven, and 16 by 1970. Two of its OBO ships, MS Berge Istra and MS Berge Vanga disappeared under mysterious, however similar circumstances in 1975 and 1979, and the company to this day keeps all information about the disasters secret.

In 1976 Sigval Bergesen d.y. was forced to retire for health reasons. Management of the company was handed over to his two grandchildren, Petter C.G. Sundt and Morten Sig. Bergesen. Ten years later, the company went from being a privately owned to a publicly traded company. Sundt and Bergesen sold their shares in the company to World-Wide Group in 2003, which rebranded into Bergesen Worldwide and then BW Group (BW).

Today, BW has 3,500 employees worldwide. It is the world's largest owner and operator of gas carriers, a business segment it moved into in 1978, and has a large fleet of liquefied natural gas (LNG) tankers.
