= List of tankers =

This is a list of tankers. The list includes merchant tankers as well as naval tankers that do not fall into more specialized lists such as List of replenishment ships of the Royal Fleet Auxiliary and List of Type T2 Tanker names.

== Crude oil tankers ==
List of Tankers
Vessel Name	Operator	IMO Number	Ship Type	Country	DWT	Year
ALICE		9709087	Crude Oil Tanker	Belgium	299982	2016
ANTONIS I.ANGELICOUS		9930777	Crude Oil Tanker	Greece	165054	2023
DALIAN		9595228	Crude Oil Tanker	United States	299981	2013
DELTA AIGAIGON		9516923	Crude Oil Tanker	United States	319725	2014
DELTA AMAZON		9748916	Crude Oil Tanker	United States	319896	2015
DELTA APOLLONIA		9516935	Crude Oil Tanker	United States	319725	2015
E140	Not In Service	9169615	Crude Oil Tanker	United Kingdom	153617	1999
EAGLE HALIFAX		9453987	Crude Oil Tanker	United Kingdom	114062	2010
EAGLE HANOVER		9398723	Crude Oil Tanker	United Kingdom	114014	2010
EAGLE HATTERAS		9453975	Crude Oil Tanker	United Kingdom	114028	2010
EAGLE HELSINKI		9453963	Crude Oil Tanker	United Kingdom	114165	2010
EAGLE HYDRA		9453999	Crude Oil Tanker	United Kingdom	113968	2011
EAGLE HAMILTON		9426207	Crude Oil Tanker	United Kingdom	114022	2010
ECO BEL AIR	Top Ships Inc.	9794056	Crude Oil Tanker	United States	157286	2021
ECO BEVERLY HILLS	Top Ships Inc.		Crude Oil Tanker	United States	157286	2019
ECO JOSHUA PARK	Top Ships Inc.		Product and Chemical Tanker Fleet	United States	50000	2019
ECO MALIBU	Top Ships Inc.	9902823	Crude Oil Tanker	United States	157286	2020
ECO MARINA DEL REY	Top Ships Inc.		Medium Range Products (MR2) Tanker	United States	50267	2021
ECO OCEANO CA	Top Ships Inc.	9794020	Crude Oil Tanker	United States	157286	2019
ECO YOSEMITE PARK	Top Ships Inc.		Supertanker	United States	50000	2020
ECO WEST COAST	Top Ships Inc.	9902811	Crude Oil Tanker	United States	157286	2021
ENERGY CENTAUR			Crude Oil Tanker	United Kingdom	74995	2008
JULIUS CESAR	Top Ships Inc.		Supertanker	United States	300000	2022
HELLESPONT PROMISE		9351438	Crude Oil Tanker	United Kingdom	73669	2007
HELLESPONT PRIDE		9351414	Crude Oil Tanker	United Kingdom	73727	2006
HELLESPONT PROGRESS		9351426	Crude Oil Tanker	United Kingdom	73727	2006
HELLESPONT PROTECTOR		9351452	Crude Oil Tanker	United Kingdom	73821	2007
KMARIN REGARD		9683063	Crude Oil Tanker	United Kingdom	109543	2016
KMARIN RELIANCE		9683025	Crude Oil Tanker	United Kingdom	109466	2016
KMARIN REASON		9683087	Crude Oil Tanker	United Kingdom	109483	2017
KMARIN RENOWN		9683013	Crude Oil Tanker	United Kingdom	109693	2016
KHARIM RIGOUR		9683049	Crude Oil Tanker	United Kingdom	109475	2016
KHARIM RESOLUTION		9683051	Crude Oil Tanker	United Kingdom	109484	2016
KMARIN RESOURCE		9683037	Crude Oil Tanker	United Kingdom	109484	2016
KMARIN RESTRAINT		9683075	Crude Oil Tanker	United Kingdom	109526	2017
KMARIN RESPECT		9683001	Crude Oil Tanker	United Kingdom	109584	2016
LEGIO X EQUESTRIS	Top Ships Inc.		Supertanker	United States	300000	2022
MAGIC ARGO	Castor Maritime	9340544	Bulk Carrier	United States	82338	2009
MAGIC CALLISTO	Castor Maritime	9641704	Bulk Carrier	United States	74930	2012
MAGIC ECLIPSE	Castor Maritime	9597331	Bulk Carrier	United States	74940	2011
MAGIC HORIZON	Castor Maritime	9553062	Bulk Carrier	United States	76619	2010
MAGIC MARS	Castor Maritime	9691400	Bulk Carrier	United States	76822	2014
MAGIC MOON	Castor Maritime	9336036	Bulk Carrier	United States	76602	2005
MAGIC NEBULA	Castor Maritime	9471264	Bulk Carrier	United States	80281	2010
MAGIC NOVA	Castor Maritime	9425679	Bulk Carrier	United States	78833	2010
MAGIC ORION	Castor Maritime	9346330	Bulk Carrier	United States	180200	2006
MAGIC P	Castor Maritime	9288447	Bulk Carrier	United States	76453	2004
MAGIC PERSEUS	Castor Maritime	9582477	Bulk Carrier	United States	82158	2013
MAGIC PLUTO	Castor Maritime	9651280	Bulk Carrier	United States	74940	2013
MAGIC STARLIGHT	Castor Maritime	9687710	Bulk Carrier	United States	80283	2015
MAGIC THUNDER	Castor Maritime	9442407	Bulk Carrier	United States	83375	2011
MAGIC VENUS	Castor Maritime	9442380	Bulk Carrier	United States	83416	2010
MAGIC VELA	Castor Maritime	9473327	Bulk Carrier	United States	75003	2011
MARAN AJAX		9790270	Crude Oil Tanker	Greece	319398	2017
MARAN ANTARES		9581203	Crude Oil Tanker	Greece	299997	2012
MARAN ANTIOPE		9901348	Crude Oil Tanker	Greece	319398	2017
MARAN APHRODITE		9810381	Crude Oil Tanker	Greece	319398	2018
MARAN APOLLO		9752993	Crude Oil Tanker	Greece	319398	2016
MARAN ARCTURUS		9588299	Crude Oil Tanker	Greece	317053	2010
MARAN ARES		9796872	Crude Oil Tanker	Greece	319398	2017
MARAN ARETE		9776547	Crude Oil Tanker	Greece	319398	2016
MARAN ARIES			Crude Oil Tanker	Greece	320871	2006
MARAN ARTEMIS			Crude Oil Tanker	Greece	319398	2016
MARAN ATALANTA			Crude Oil Tanker	Greece	319398	2018
MARAN LEO			Crude Oil Tanker	Greece	319450	2014
MARAN LYNX			Crude Oil Tanker	Greece	318833	2011
MARAN LUPUS		9418066	Crude Oil Tanker	Greece	318080	2023
MARAN DANAE		9930791	Crude Oil Tanker	Greece	320917	2023
MARAN DIONE		9930806	Crude Oil Tanker	Greece	320916	2023
MARAN HELEN			Crude Oil Tanker	Greece	156458	2017
MARAN HELIOUS			Crude Oil Tanker	Greece	156458	2017
MARAN HERCULES			Crude Oil Tanker	Greece	156458	2017
MARAN HERMES			Crude Oil Tanker	Greece	156458	2017
MARAN HERMOINE			Crude Oil Tanker	Greece	156458	2017
MARAN HOMER			Crude Oil Tanker	Greece	156458	2017
MARAN LEO			Crude Oil Tanker	Greece	319450	2014
MARAN LIBRA			Crude Oil Tanker	Greece	319431	2014
MARAN LUPUS			Crude Oil Tanker	Greece	318080	2009
MARAN LYNX			Crude Oil Tanker	Greece	318833	2011
MARAN LYRA			Crude Oil Tanker	Greece	317924	2010
MARAN MIRA			Crude Oil Tanker	Greece	299995	2020
MARAN ORPHEUS			Crude Oil Tanker	Greece	157946	2020
MARAN PENELOPE			Crude Oil Tanker	Greece	158266	2009
MARAN PHOEBE			Crude Oil Tanker	Greece	157946	2020
MARAN PLATO			Crude Oil Tanker	Greece	158267	2009
MARAN POSEIDON			Crude Oil Tanker	Greece	158267	2010
MARAN PYTHIA			Crude Oil Tanker	Greece	158266	2009
MARAN SOLON			Crude Oil Tanker	Greece	157947	2021
MARAN TAURUS			Crude Oil Tanker	Greece	321052	2011
MARAN THALEIA			Crude Oil Tanker	Greece	321225	2011
MARAN THETIS			Crude Oil Tanker	Greece	320105	2012
MILTIADIS JUNIOR		9693745	Crude Oil Tanker	United States	320926	2014
OCEANS			Crude Oil Tanker	Greece	320780	2011
OCEANIC FORTUNE		9424209	Crude Oil Tanker	United States	320054	2010
OLYMPIC TARGET			Crude Oil Tanker	Greece	319861	2011
OLYMPIC TRUST			Crude Oil Tanker	United States	319616	2010
OLYMPIC LEOPARD			Crude Oil Tanker	Greece	319368	2011
OLYMPIC LION		9445459	Crude Oil Tanker	United States	319540	2010
OLYMPIC TROPHY			Crude Oil Tanker	Greece	320159	2010
OLYMPIC LUCK			Crude Oil Tanker	Greece	319106	2010
XING YE		9590058	Crude Oil Tanker	China	320557	2014
YONG LE		9623257	Crude Oil Tanker	China	320775	2014
YUAN FU WANG		9843314	Crude Oil Tanker	China	319668	2021
YUAN HUA YANG		9843297	Crude Oil Tanker	China	319786	2020
YUAN GUI YANG		9590058	Crude Oil Tanker	China	319702	2020
YUAN RUI YANG		9843326	Crude Oil Tanker	China	318451	2022

== Supertankers ==
Operator	Origins	Class or name	Builder	Type	Year built	DWT	Year of Retirement	Fate
Euronav NV	Belgium	HELLESPONT FAIRFAX	Daewoo Shipbuilding and Marine Engineering	Supertanker	2002			still active
Overseas Shipping Group	United States	TI class supertankers/TI Asia, formerly Hellespont Alhambra	Daewoo Shipbuilding and Marine Engineering	Supertanker	2002		2009	converted to FSO
	United States	TI class supertankers/TI Africa, formerly Hellespont Metropolis	Daewoo Shipbuilding and Marine Engineering	Supertanker	2002		2010	converted to FSO
Maersk Line	United States	Maersk Peary	STX Offshore & Shipbuilding	polar tanker	2004			still active
Exxon	Panama	Exxon Valdez	National Steel and Shipbuilding Company	Supertanker	1986			converted to ore carrier and renamed Dong Fang Ocean
BP	United Kingdom	P-Class	Samsung Heavy Industries	Very Large Crude Carriers (VLCC)	1999-2000			still active - 4 vessels in class
BP	United Kingdom	Tree Class	Tsuneishi Shipbuilding Co.	Aframax	2002-2004			still active - 8 vessels in class
BP	United Kingdom	Bird Class	Samsung Heavy Industries	Aframax	2003-2006			still active - 12 vessels in class
BP	United Kingdom	E-Class	Hyundai Mipo Dockyard	medium range products tanker	2003-2007			still active - 5 vessels in class
BP	United Kingdom	Virtue Class	Hyundai Mipo Dockyard	large range product tanker	2004-2005			still active - 12 vessels in class
BP	United Kingdom	C- Class	Mitsubishi Heavy Industries	liquefied petroleum gas (LPG) carrier	2006-2007			still active - 4 vessels in class
BP	United Kingdom	Trader Class	Samsung Heavy Industries	LNG carrier	2002-2003			still active - 3 vessels in class
BP	United Kingdom	GEM Class	Hyundai Heavy Industries	LNG carrier	2007-2008			still active - 4 vessels in class
Wilhelmsen Lines	Singapore	LPG Gas Carriers/LPG/C Ayame,	Mitsubishi Heavy Industries	LPG gas carrier	2010			still active
OOCL	Liberia	Seawise Giant; later Knock Nevis, Jahre Viking, Happy Giant	Sumitomo Heavy Industries, Ltd.	Supertanker	1981		2009	scrapped in Alang, India
	France	Prairial; renamed Hellas Fos, renamed Sea Giant	Chantiers de l'Atlantique/Alstom Marine	Supertanker	1979		2003	scrapped in Pakistan
	France	Batillus class supertankers/Pierre Guillaumat; renamed Ulsan Master	Chantiers de l'Atlantique/Alstom Marine	Supertanker	1977		1983	scrapped in Ulsan, South Korea
Esso International Shipping (Bahamas) Co Ltd, Nassau	Bahamas; Greece	Esso Atlantic; renamed Kapetan Giannis	Hitachi Zosen	Supertanker	1977		1990	scrapped in Pakistan 2002
Esso Eastern Marine Ltd., Bermuda and Ceres Hellenic Shipping Enterprises Inc	Bermuda, Greece	Esso Pacific; renamed Kapetan Michalis	Hitachi Zosen	Supertanker	1977		1990	scrapped in Pakistan 2002
Nav Alta Italia	Italy	Ultra Large Crude Carrier/Nai Superba	Eriksbergs Mekaniska Verkstad	Supertanker	1978		2000	scrapped in Chittagong Roads, Bangladesh
Nav Alta Italia	Italy	Ultra Large Crude Carrier/Nai Genova	Eriksbergs Mekaniska Verkstad	Supertanker	1978		2000	scrapped in Alang, India
Société Maritime Shell France	France	Batillus class supertankers/Batillus	Chantiers de l'Atlantique/Alstom Marine	Supertanker	1976		1985	scrapped in Kaohsiung, Taiwan
Zenit Tank AB	Sweden	Ultra Large Crude Carrier/T/T Nanny	Uddevallavarvet	Supertanker	1978		2003	scrapped in Jiangyin, China
Saléninvest AB	Sweden	Ultra Large Crude Carrier/T/T Sea Saga	Kockums	Supertanker	1977		2003	scrapped in China
Saléninvest, Sweden	Sweden	Ultra Large Crude Carrier/Sea Serenade	Kockums	Supertanker	1976		1984	decommissioned after hit by Iraqi rockets in the Gulf of Persia; aft was complete burnt out; scrapped in Kaohsiung, Taiwan
Salénrederierna, Sweden	Sweden	Ultra Large Crude Carrier/Sea Symphony	Kockums	Supertanker	1975		2002	scrapped in Bangladesh
Saléninvest, Sweden	Sweden	Ultra Large Crude Carrier/Sea Song	Kockums	Supertanker	1977			converted to FPSO named Kome Kribi 1
Salénrederierna, Sweden	Sweden	Ultra Large Crude Carrier/Sea Saint	Kockums	Supertanker	1974			converted to FPSO named Fluminense. Two active in a series of six.
Rederi AB Malmoil	Sweden	Ultra Large Crude Carrier/Sea Scape	Kockums	Supertanker	1975		2002	scrapped in Xinhui, China
Sture Ödner, Sweden	Sweden	Ultra Large Crude Carrier/Sea Stratus	Kockums	Supertanker	1975		2000	scrapped in Alang, India
Société Maritime Shell France	France	Batillus class supertankers/Bellamya	Chantiers de l'Atlantique/Alstom Marine	Supertanker	1976		1986	scrapped in Ulsan, South Korea
Barracuda Tanker Corporation	United States/United Kingdom	Torrey Canyon	Newport News Shipbuilding	Supertanker	1960?		1967	wrecked
Varun Shipping Company Pvt Ltd	India	LPG Gas Carriers/LPG/C Maharshi Shubhatreya, formerly LPG/C Libin	Mitsubishi Heavy Industries	LPG gas carrier	1982			still active
Varun Shipping Company Pvt Ltd	India	LPG Gas Carriers/LPG/C Maharshi Bhardwaj, formerly LPG/C Nordanger	Hyundai Heavy Industries	LPG gas carrier	1992			still active
Varun Shipping Company Pvt Ltd	India	LPG Gas Carriers/LPG/C Maharshi Labhatreya, formerly LPG/C Hector	Moss Verft	LPG gas garrier	1984			sold to Mount Risho Investments for $12 mill for storage project in Africa

- Former supertankers converted into Mercy class hospital ships
  - USNS Mercy, formerly SS Worth
  - USNS Comfort, formerly SS Rose City (MA-301)

== Others ==
- MV Gulfstream

== See also ==
- List of oil spills
