= Top Ships =

Maritime transportation company

Top Ships Inc.
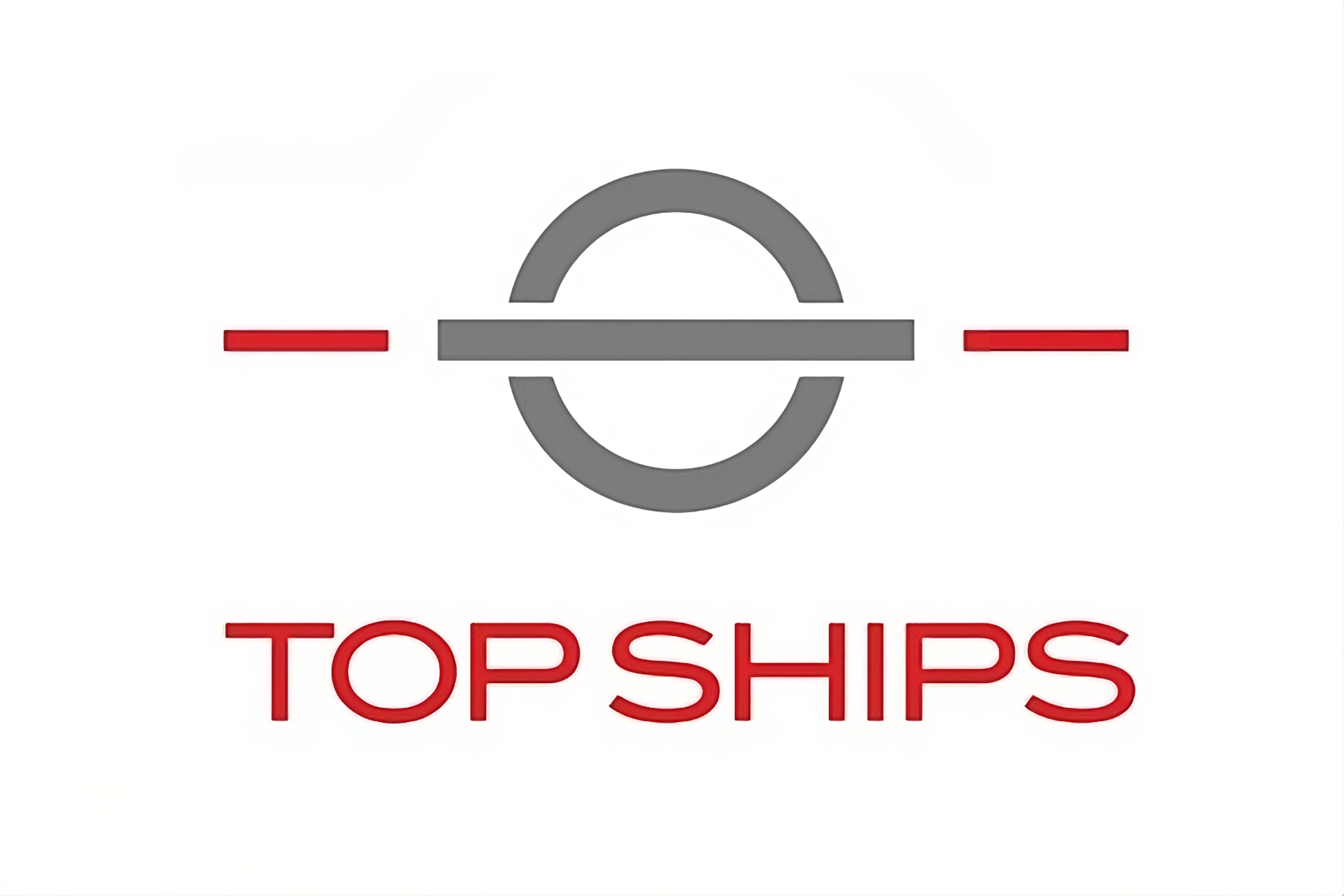
- Company type: Public company
- Traded as: NYSE: TOPS (Class A); Russell 1000 component
- Founded: January 1999; 27 years ago
- Founders: Evangelos J. Pistiolis; Alexandros Tsirikos
- Headquarters: Maroussi, Greece
- Key people: Konstantinos Karelas, Paolo Javarone, Stavros Emmanouil
- Services: Maritime Transportation Operator
- Revenue: ▲US$2.067 billion (2023)
- Operating income: ▼US$−842 million (2023)
- Number of employees: 5,884 (2023)
- Website: https://www.topships.org
- Footnotes / references Financials as of January 31, 2023

Top Ships Inc. is a supply chain maritime transportation (or ocean transportation) operations management company responsible for seaborne trade of raw materials. The company was founded by Evangelos J. Pistiolis on January 10, 2000 and is headquartered in Maroussi, Greece.

The company's medium range tanker vessels transport crude oil, petroleum products, and bulk liquid chemicals. It allows corporate users to transport large quantities of unrefined crude oil from its point of extraction to refineries, petroleum products such as gasoline, diesel fuel, or petrochemical products from the refineries. Top Ships services offers maritime transport for managing and operating large and diversified fleets of ocean freight ships ranging from product tanker fleets, chemical tanker fleets, crude oil tanker (or petroleum tanker) fleets, and Very Large Crude Carrier (VLCC) fleet vessels.

== History ==
Top Ships Inc. was founded In January 1999 by the company CEO, Evangelos J. Pistiolis, in Maroussi, Greece. The company's initial public offering raised $3.4 billion in January 2020..

In November 2008, the company appointed a former United Kingdom (UK) Chartered Accountant (ACA) executive Alexandros Tsirikos on the Executive Director Board of Directors for Top Ships. Alexandros Tsirikos is the Chief Financial Officer and has been employed with Top Ships since early July 2007.
