= LPGC Ayame =

History

Singapore
- Name: Ayame
- Owner: Mitsui O.S.K. Lines
- Operator: Wilhelmsen Lines aka Wilhelmsen Ship Management
- Builder: Mitsubishi Heavy Industries Ltd, Nagasaki
- Yard number: 2250
- Launched: 26 January 2010
- Completed: 30 April 2010
- Home port: Singapore
- Identification: IMO number: 9415662; Call sign: 9V8098; MMSI number: 565238000

General characteristics
- Type: Gas carrier
- Tonnage: 51,041 GT; 55,076 DWT; 55,396 NT
- Length: 230 m (750 ft)
- Beam: 36.6 m (120 ft)
- Draught: 15.5 m (51 ft)
- Depth: 11.6 m (38 ft) (deck edge to keel)
- Propulsion: 1 × 80 MW (107,282 hp) Wärtsilä 14RT-Flex96c diesel engine; 5 × Caterpillar 8M32 diesel engines, 30 MW (40,231 hp)
- Speed: 25.5 knots (47.2 km/h; 29.3 mph)
- Capacity: 83,000 m^{3} (2,900,000 cu ft)

LPG/C Ayame is a Very Large Gas Carrier (VLGC), with a capacity of 83,000 m^{3} (2,900,000 cu ft), delivered in 2010 from MHI Ltd. of Nagasaki, and under the management of Wilhelmsen Lines Malaysia.

== Ship history ==
On 30 April 2010 the LPG carrier Ayame was completed at the Mitsubishi Heavy Industries Nagasaki Shipyard. A naming ceremony was held on 22 April at the shipyard, with guests including Ikuhiro Ochi, President/Managing Director of the shipowner. Mitsui O.S.K. Lines Managing Executive Officer Tsuneo Watanabe, who named the vessel, and Astomos Energy Corporation Senior Managing Director Tatsuhiko Yamazaki, who cut the rope.

The Ayame is the third 83,000m3-class LPG carrier ordered from MHI. The first, the Musanah, was delivered on 4 December 2009, and the second, the Aquamarine Progress, on 15 January 2010. Upon its launching, the Ayama was assigned to an LPG carrier pool operated by LPG Global Transport Management Inc. and left on its maiden voyage to load cargo in the Middle East.

Common Route: – Japan – Singapore – Indonesia – Ruwais

== See also ==
- Gas carrier
- Mitsui O.S.K. Lines
- LNG carrier
- Liquefied petroleum gas
- List of tankers
- Shipping
