= LEG carrier =

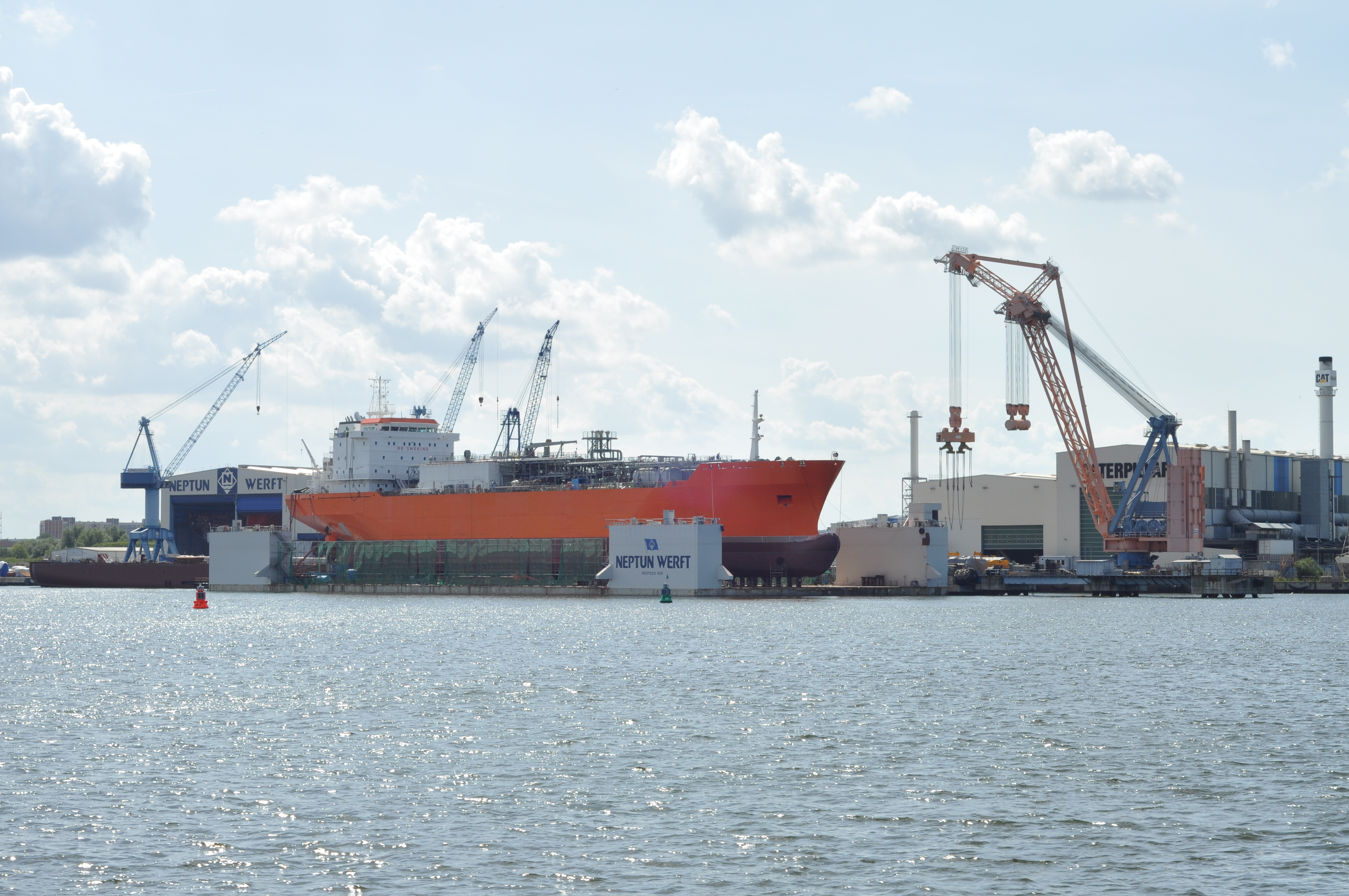
The LEG carrier Gaschem Pacific under construction at Rostok in 2009

Liquefied ethylene gas (LEG) carriers are a type of gas carrier, a ship designed to transport ethylene at sea. Most LEG ships are considered small compared to other gas carriers (typically 2,000 to 15,000 m^{3}, 71,000 to 530,000 cu ft) although there are larger LEG ships that have the hybrid capability of carrying liquid natural gas (LNG) and/or liquefied petroleum gas (LPG) as well.

== History ==
Some of the first LEG carriers were built in the 1960s. These include the 1964 ship Pythagore in France and the 1965 Japanese ship Ethlene Maru No 1.

== Gas carriage ==
LEG carriers are built with a cargo containment system to handle ethylene with a boiling point of −104 °C (−155 °F). Ethylene is transported at sea for industrial purposes as it is one of the main feedstocks for the petrochemical industry. The low temperature requires fully refrigerated ships with the cargo at atmospheric pressure or semi-pressurised/fully refrigerated (semi-ref) ships with pressure vessel cargo tanks. Semi-refrigerated LEG carriers use special alloyed steels to allow the carriage of ethylene at -104°C. Tanks must be kept in clean and well maintained condition as product purity is important in carriage onboard. Cargo operations on these ships are carried out with a view to avoiding impurities affecting the cargo and in ensuring cargoes are carried at atmospheric pressure.

== Design and equipment ==
The design and construction of LEG carriers operating internationally is regulated by the International Maritime Organization through the International Code of the Construction and Equipment of Ships Carrying Liquefied Gases in Bulk. LEG ships are fitted with a re-liquefaction plant for ethylene. Some ships also have the capability for ethane, and LPG, as well as for various petrochemical cargoes. A pressure swing adsorption (PSA) plant is sometimes used to separate some gases from a mixture of gases under pressure on LEG carriers. Most ships utilise a number of compressors onboard.

Some new LEG carriers are being built with dual fuel capability, including the use of LNG alongside existing marine gas oil (MGO) to reduce carbon dioxide emissions.
