= Castor Maritime =

Global shipping company

Castor Maritime Inc.
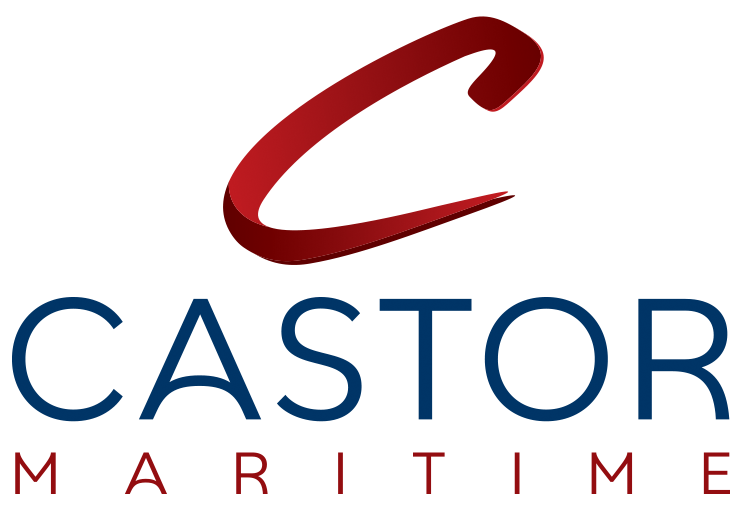
- Company type: Public
- Traded as: NYSE: CTRM (Class A); Russell 1000 component
- Founded: September 2017; 8 years ago
- Founders: Petros Panagiotidis; Dionysios Makris
- Headquarters: Cyprus
- Key people: Georgious Daskalakis
- Services: Seaborne Transportation
- Revenue: ▲US$2.067 billion (2023)
- Operating income: ▼US$−842 million (2023)
- Website: castormaritime.com
- Footnotes / references Financials as of January 31, 2023

Castor Maritime Inc. is a maritime transport global shipping company that operates and manages tanker ship vessels and cargo bulk carriers. The company was founded by Petros Panagiotidis and Dionysios Makris in early September 2017. The company headquarters is located in Cyprus.

Castor Maritime in offers a wide range of commodities such as steel products, cement, raw bauxite, iron ores, coal, scrap metals, sugar, and whole grains. The company owns three types of tanker vessels such as dry bulk, oil tanker vessels (or petroleum tanker) and a LR2 (Long-range 2) type tanker vessels.

== History ==
Castor Maritime was founded in September 2017 in Cyprus by Petros Panagiotidis incorporated under the laws of Marshall Islands. Panagiotidis founded Castor Maritime Inc. in 2017, he is the Chief Financial Officer and Chief Executive Officer and also holds a position in the Board of Directors since the establishment of his company. Panagiotidis graduated from Fordham University with a degree in International Studies and Mathematics and a master's degree in Risk Management from New York University. Dionysios Makris served in the Hellenic Navy as Officer as the Special operations (or Ops Officer) Navigation Admin in 1983 to 1986. From 1998 to 2005, Makris served in Greek military as the commanding officer for the HS KOS and Division officers and Weapons officer. Makris graduated in 2003 from the Hellenic Naval Academy where he received a Master's degree in Military, Strategic and Management studies. During October 1998 to August 2001, he worked as the Radar and Fire Control Engineer for NATO SeaSparrow Project administered by Greece's Defense and Space Industry. In 2005, Makris served as the National Liaison Officer for the Hellenic Navy General Staff at NATO Undersea Research Centre (NURC) Scientific Committee of National Representatives National Liaison Officers and Observers for Maritime Innovation. NURC conducts maritime research in support of new military capabilities for NATO organized into four research areas. In 2011, Dionysios Markris was promoted to the Deputy Chief of Staff for NATO headquarters stationed in Naples. In April 2021, Castor Maritime announced that they raised $125 million in a public offering for Castor Maritime.

In April 2021, Castor Maritime announced that it had entered an into an agreement through two subsidiaries from an unaffiliated third-party vendor to purchase two 2005 Korean-built Aframax tanker vessels for $27.2 million.

In a statement the Castor Maritime chief executive officer Petros Panagiotidis said, "We are pleased to announce our tenth vessel acquisition in 2021 with the addition of an Aframax tanker to Castor’s fleet. Upon completion of all our recently announced acquisitions, our fleet will consist of sixteen vessels. We constantly monitor the market for attractive acquisition opportunities across vessel sizes and segments."

== Castor Maritime Fleet Acquisition ==
Vessel Name	Operator Name	IMO Number	Ship Type	Country	DWT	Year built
Magic Argo	Castor Maritime	9340544	Bulk carrier	Marshall Islands	82338	2009
Magic Callisto	Castor Maritime	9641704	Bulk carrier	Marshall Islands	74930	2012
Magic Eclipse	Castor Maritime	9597331	Bulk carrier	Marshall Islands	74940	2011
Magic Horizon	Castor Maritime	9553062	Bulk carrier	Marshall Islands	76619	2010
Magic Mars	Castor Maritime	9691400	Bulk carrier	Marshall Islands	76822	2014
Magic Moon	Castor Maritime	9336036	Bulk carrier	Marshall Islands	76602	2005
Magic Nebula	Castor Maritime	9471264	Bulk carrier	Marshall Islands	80281	2010
Magic Nova	Castor Maritime	9425679	Bulk carrier	Marshall Islands	78833	2010
Magic Orion	Castor Maritime	9346330	Bulk carrier	Marshall Islands	180200	2006
Magic P	Castor Maritime	9288447	Bulk carrier	Marshall Islands	76453	2004
Magic Perseus	Castor Maritime	9582477	Bulk carrier	Marshall Islands	82158	2013
Magic Pluto	Castor Maritime	9651280	Bulk carrier	Marshall Islands	74940	2013
Magic Starlight		9687710	Bulk carrier	Marshall Islands	80283	2015
Magic Thunder	Castor Maritime	9442407	Bulk carrier	Marshall Islands	83375	2011
Magic Vela	Castor Maritime	9473327	Bulk carrier	Marshall Islands	75003	2011
Magic Venus	Castor Maritime	9442380	Bulk carrier	Marshall Islands	83416	2010

On October 19, 2023, Castor Maritime received a 180-day extension to meet the NASDAQ's $1 per share hold minimum bid requirement, with its deadline reset to April 15, 2024.
