= List of Esso Atlantic-class supertankers =

History

Liberia
- Name: Esso Atlantic and Esso Pacific
- Owner: Esso Tankers Inc. Liberia (ExxonMobil)
- Builder: Hitachi Zosen Corporation Ariake
- Yard number: 4484, 4485
- Launched: October 2, 1977, June 13, 1977
- Completed: 1977
- Fate: Scrapped August, 2002, September, 2002

General characteristics
- Class & type: ULCC
- Tonnage: 259,532 GT; 186,500 NT after rename; 516,895 DWT after rename
- Displacement: 73,418 tons light ship; 590,308 tons full load
- Length: 406.57 m (1,333.89 ft)
- Beam: 71.07 m (233.17 ft)
- Draught: 25.29 metres (83.0 ft)
- Depth: 31.22 m (102.43 ft)
- Installed power: 45,000 h.p.
- Propulsion: Steam Turbine
- Speed: 15.5 knots, 1 Propeller
- Notes: Esso Atlantic IMO 7376525; Esso Pacific IMO 7376537

The two ships of the Esso Atlantic class, Esso Atlantic and Esso Pacific, were two of only seven ships to surpass a half million tons deadweight in maritime history.

When plying the sea, the vessels had a fully laden draft of 25.3 m (83 ft), rendering them unable to navigate the English Channel, the Suez Canal or the Panama Canal when loaded to capacity.

== Esso Atlantic (1977-1990) 234,626 tons to 247,160 tons, 508,628 DWT ==
10/02/1977 : Esso Atlantic launched and built
1/2/1983 : Transferred to Bahamian flag, owned by Esso International Shipping Co Ltd, Nassau, Bahamas
16/08/1986 : Laid Up near Ålesund
??/??/1990 : By Esso Eastern Marine Ltd., Bermuda, to Ceres Hellenic Shipping Ent. Ltd., Greece. Renamed Kapetan Giannis
13/06/2002 : from Fujairah Anchorage bound for LOOP Oil Terminal. Sold to Pakistani breakers in 2002.

== Esso Pacific (1977-1990) 234,626 tons to 247,161 tons, 508,628 DWT ==
13/06/1977 : Esso Pacific launched and built
??/??/1983 : Transferred to Bahamian flag, owned by Esso International Shipping Co Ltd, Nassau, Bahamas
16/08/1986 : Laid Up near Ålesund
??/??/1990 : By Esso Eastern Marine Ltd., Bermuda, to Ceres Hellenic Shipping Ent. Ltd., Greece. Renamed Kapetan Michalis
2002: Broken up in Gadani Beach, Pakistan.

== See also ==
- Orders of magnitude (length)
- List of world's longest ships
- List of tankers
