= Dionysios Makris =

Greek naval commander

- Born: Dionysios Makris; Athens, Greece
- Education: Hellenic Naval War College
- Scientific career
- Fields: Special Operations
- Workplaces: Hellenic Naval Command, Hellenic Navy General Staff, NATO HQ MC Naples, NATO SeaSparrow Project Office, Configuration Management Office Castor Maritime Inc.
- Thesis: Real-Time Scheduling and Synchronization for the NPS Autonomous Underwater Vehicle (1991)

Dionysios Makris is a Greek naval commander officer of the Hellenic Navy General Staff and the Deputy Chief of Staff for Support (DCOSS) North Atlantic Treaty Organization (NATO) Rear Admiral NATO Headquarters Maritime Command (MC) in Naples. As the Maritime Commander, Makris managed the planning and execution of operations of DCOSS areas of responsibility providing administrative budget resources for Weapons Divisions (C3) Division-head N1 (Personnel), N4 (Logistics), N6 (Communications) and N8 (Finance) divisions of the Command Group workforce for NATO HQ Maritime Command and the Hellenic Naval Command. Makris is a Greek delegate for NATO Naval Armaments Group (NNAG) Steering Committee member of NATO bilateral relations. United States Department of Defense (DOD) Defense Technical Information Center (DTIC) published a thesis report Dionysios submitted for a research paper on Unmanned Underwater Vehicle (UUV) on their website's public archive. Dionysios Makris has over 29 years of experience in the naval warfare and expertise in leading special operations.

== Early life and education ==
Dionysios Makris served in the Hellenic Navy as Officer as the Special operations (or Ops Officer) Navigation Admin in 1983 to 1986. Dionysios received a bachelor's degree in Naval Science and Art obtained from the Hellenic Naval Academy during 1983. Dionysios graduated from US Naval Postgraduate School in 1999 where he studied Electrical and Electronics Engineering with Distinction and from Hellenic Naval War College in 2002 with a master's degree in Strategic and Management Studies. Dionysios Makris attended Hellenic Defense College where he received a master's degree in strategic and management studies during 2003. From 2010 to 2015, Makris received his fifth master's degree in Electrical and Computer Engineering at the National Technical University of Athens located in Greece. He obtained a Maritime Training and Certification diploma from a DNV certified SQE Marine Group Ship Security Officer (SSO) ILO MLC Designated Person Ashore (DPA) Integrated Maritime Auditor (IMA) in 2013.

== Career ==
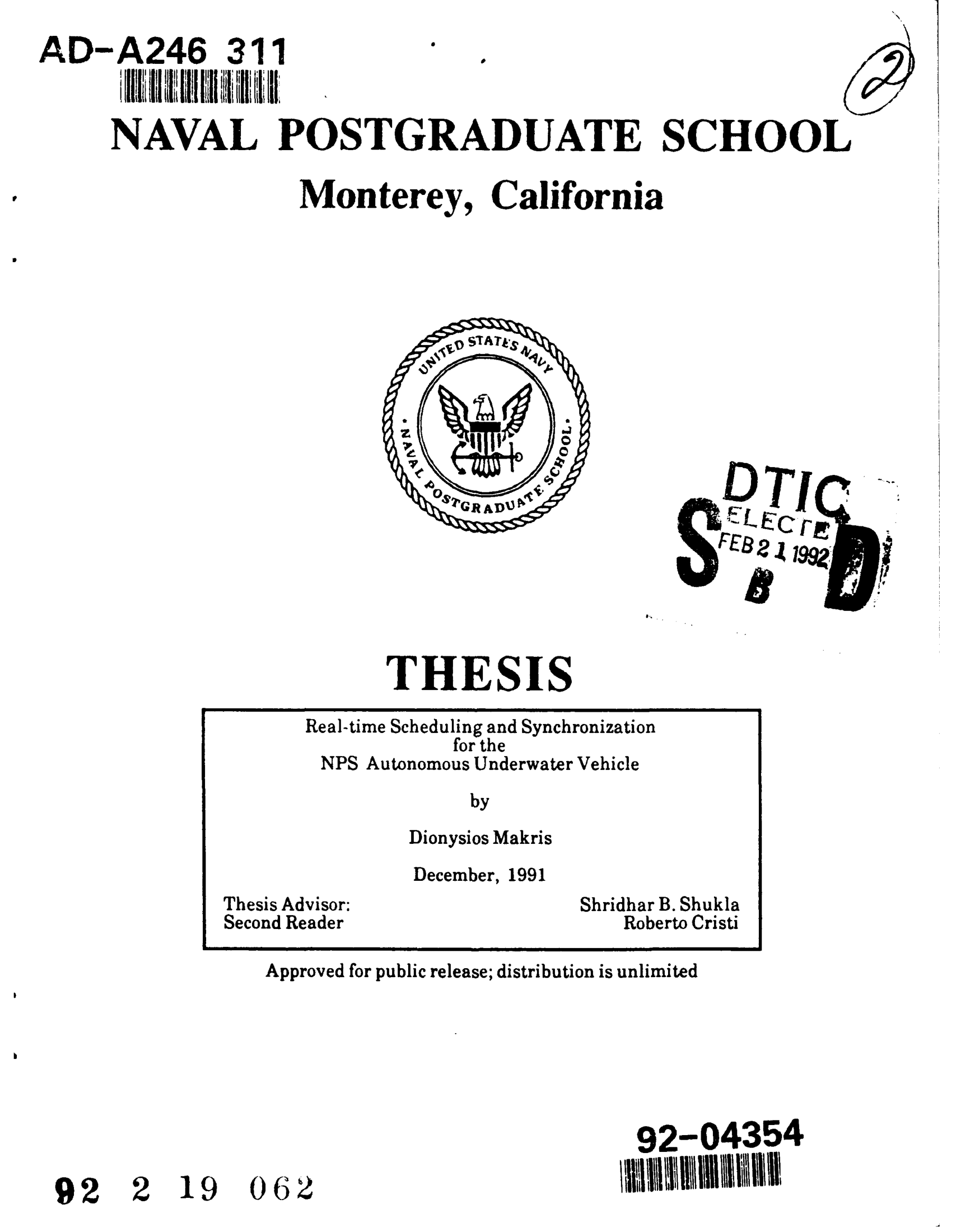
Approved for Public Release - THESIS by Dionysios Makris

During 1983 to 1989, Dionysius Makris served as Administrative Assistant Navigation Officer and Tactical Action Officer in Advanced Anti-Submarine Warfare (AASW) at the Hellenic Navy. During October 1998 to August 2001, he worked as the Radar and Fire Control Engineer for NATO Sea Sparrow Project administered by Greece Defense and Space Industry. In 2005, Makris served as the National Liaison Officer for the Hellenic Navy General Staff at NATO Undersea Research Centre (NURC) Scientific Committee of National Representatives National Liaison Officers and Observers for Maritime Innovation. NURC conducts maritime research in support of new military capabilities for NATO organized into four research areas. In 2011, Dionysios Makris was promoted to the Deputy Chief of Staff for NATO headquarters stationed in Naples. Dionysios Makris is a special operations naval commander of the Hellenic Navy General Staff. Makris led the Hellenic Navy as the commanding naval special operations officer S-class FFGHM, guided missile frigate with a hangar and surface-to-air missiles class formidable-class multi-role stealth frigates vessel units. Markris served as Commanding Officer within Executive Division and Weapon Officer for Hellenic Navy Command HS KOS administrative chains of command in naval special warfare tactical operations control and tactical intervention.

== See also ==
- Castor Maritime
- Hellenic Navy
- Hellenic Navy General Staff
