= Evangelos Pistiolis =

Greek businessman

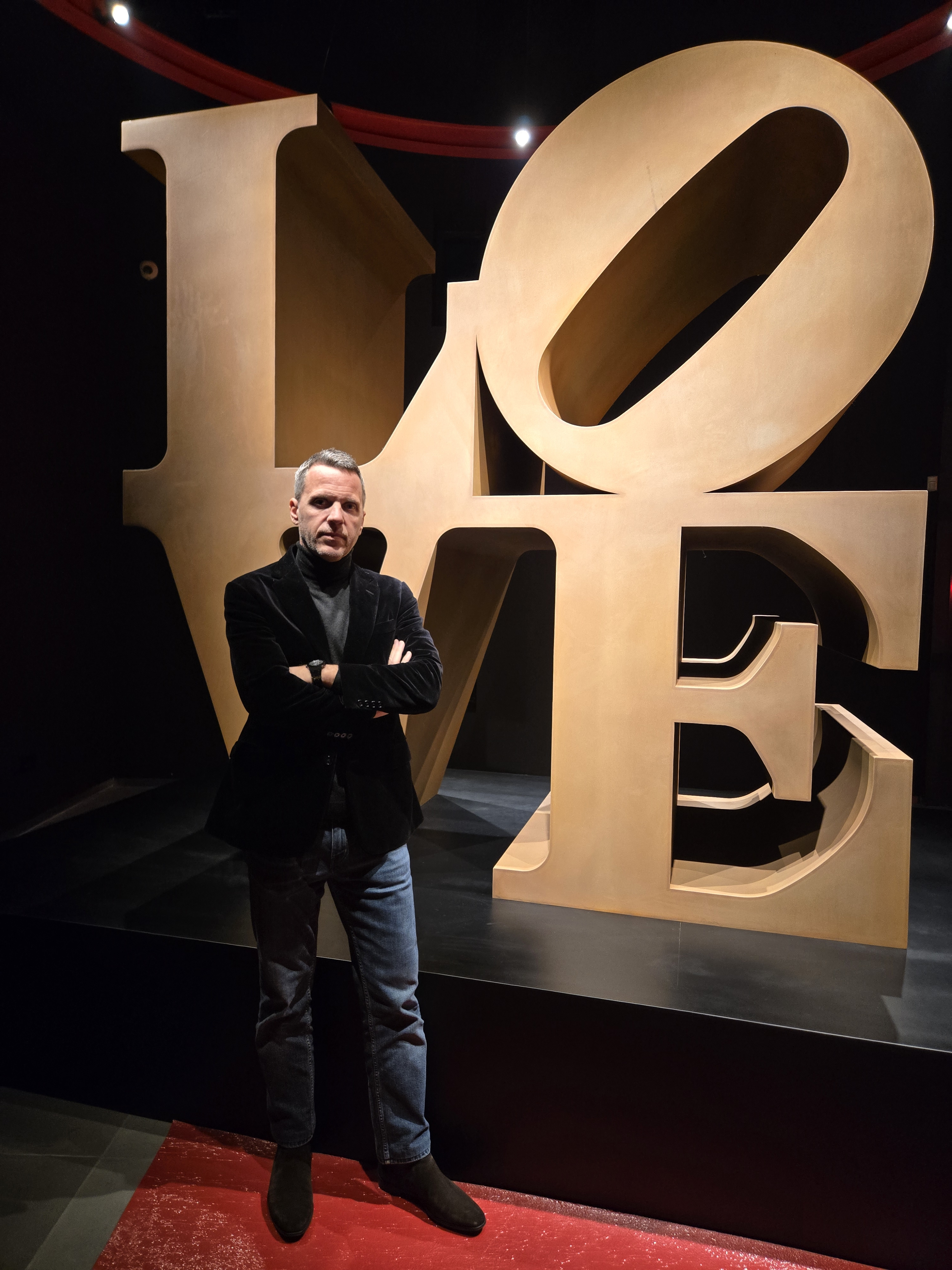
- Evangelos Pistiolis
- Education: Athens College; Southampton Solent University; Technical University of Munich
- Occupations: Shipowner, Entrepreneur, Investor
- Known for: CEO and major shareholder of Top Ships Inc.
- Title: Founder and CEO of Central Group
- Website: Official website

Evangelos Pistiolis (born 1973) is a Greek billionaire shipowner, entrepreneur and investor.

He is the founder of the shipping company Top Ships Inc. Serving as its chief executive officer since 2000. The company operates in the international oil and petroleum products tanker market.

Pistiolis is also the founder and CEO of Central Group, a private investment conglomerate with activities in shipping, energy and real estate.

In addition, he serves as the Honorary Consul of Hungary in Piraeus, contributing institutionally to the strengthening of Greek–Hungarian relations.

== Biography ==
Pistiolis completed his primary and secondary education at Athens College.

In 1994, he received a degree in Mechanical engineering from the Technical University of Munich (TUM).

In 1999, he graduated from the Southampton Institute of Higher Education (later Southampton Solent University) with studies in Maritime business.

From 1994 to 1995 he worked for the shipbroking company Howe Robinson & Co. Ltd. in London, managing a small fleet of bulk carriers.

During his studies at Southampton, he simultaneously worked for Compass United Maritime Container Vessels, a Greek-based ship management company.

In 2000, at the age of 27, Pistiolis acquired his first vessel, marking his entry as a shipowner into the international shipping market.

In 2022, Pistiolis founded the Swiss-based Evangelos Pistiolis Foundation. In 2026, the foundation was named among the donors whose support enabled the acquisition of the new Athens headquarters of the Swiss School of Archaeology in Greece (ESAG).

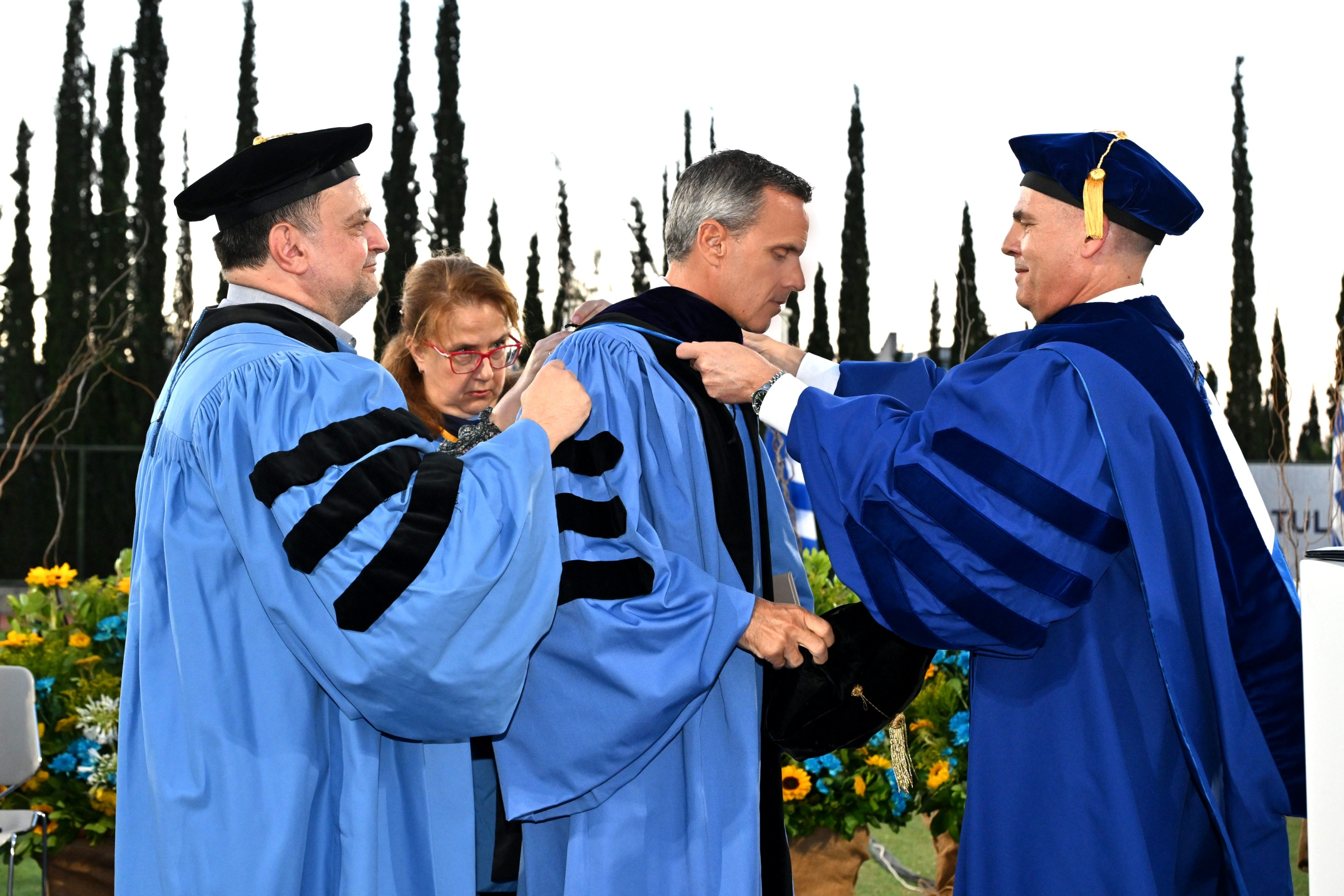
Pistiolis during the conferral of the honorary degree in 2026.

In 2026, The American College of Greece conferred on Pistiolis the honorary degree of Doctor of Laws, Honoris Causa during its Nineteenth Graduate Commencement Ceremony for Alba Graduate Business School and the Deree Graduate Programs.

== Business activity ==
Pistiolis is the founder and chief executive officer of the NASDAQ-listed shipping company Top Ships Inc., as well as of Central Group, a private investment conglomerate with activities in shipping and real estate. The Central Group portfolio includes several companies such as Central Shipping Inc., Central Mare Inc., Central Tankers Chartering Inc., and Central International Construction and Development (CICD).

In 2025, the spin-off of its subsidiary Rubico Inc. was completed, which was separately listed on NASDAQ.

=== Shipping ===
In 2004, Pistiolis listed the then-named Top Tankers Inc. (later Top Ships Inc.) on NASDAQ, raising more than US$146 million in its initial public offering (IPO). The success of the IPO made him one of the youngest CEOs of a listed shipping company and was considered a benchmark for the sector.

In 2006, he announced a shipbuilding program for product/chemical tankers in South Korea, and in 2007 he placed newbuilding orders worth approximately US$300 million.

Between 2013 and 2020, companies under his control ordered vessels valued at around US$2.2 billion from Hyundai Heavy Industries group shipyards, while since 2020 he has shown interest in the LNG sector.

In 2017, Top Ships entered a joint venture with Gunvor Group for two product tankers under construction at Hyundai shipyards. During the same period, the company acquired newly built tankers under long-term time charters.

By 2024, Top Ships pursued strategic vessel acquisitions and sales. The group has employed sale-and-leaseback models and financing arrangements with international lenders.

In 2025, Pistiolis completed the Rubico Inc. spin-off while securing approximately US$290 million in financing through tanker sales to Chinese financiers.

In February 2026, Pistiolis ordered ten product tankers from the Chinese shipyard Guangzhou Shipyard International (GSI), in a deal valued at close to $500 million. Subsequently, Top Ships announced the acquisition of nine of the newbuilding contracts, which are backed by time charter agreements of up to 11 years, with total estimated revenues of approximately $680 million.

In June 2026, Pistiolis, through Central Mare, ordered three additional medium-range (MR) product tankers from HD Hyundai Heavy Industries. Together with the ten vessels ordered earlier that year at Guangzhou Shipyard International, the publicly reported orders then comprised 13 MR tankers, with an estimated total value of approximately US$650 million.

In August 2026, Pistiolis, through Central Mare, placed his first newbuilding order with South Korea's K Shipbuilding, comprising two additional 50,000-dwt MR product tankers. The vessels were reported to cost more than US$53 million each and were scheduled for delivery in mid-2028. TradeWinds further reported that, according to market observers, newbuilding deals linked to Pistiolis during 2026 may have involved nearly 25 vessels with a combined value exceeding US$1 billion.

In September 2026, Proto Thema, citing data from Veson Nautical, included Pistiolis in its ranking of the five largest Greek tanker sellers by transaction value. Top Ships placed second, with reported transactions totaling approximately US$413.72 million during 2026.

In October 2026, Top Ships, led by Pistiolis, agreed to acquire four additional MR product tankers under construction at Guangzhou Shipyard International through the purchase of the companies holding their shipbuilding contracts. Subject to completion, the acquisition would bring the company's MR newbuilding programme to 14 vessels.

=== Real estate ===
Beyond shipping, Pistiolis is active in the real estate sector through:

- Top Properties S.A. – with developments in Filothei Psychiko and Kavouri.
- Central International Construction & Development (CICD) – the real estate arm of the Central Group, with a portfolio exceeding US$400 million.

In 2022, he acquired the former property complex of fashion designer Lakis Gavalas in Kantza, Attica.

He also maintains investments in high-end international real estate, mainly in Dubai.

== Bibliography ==
Pistiolis business activity and strategic approach have been analyzed or referenced in various academic and published works, such as:

- Martin Stopford – Maritime Economics (Routledge, ISBN 978-0-415-27558-3).
- Paul Emmanuelides & George Tsavliris – Winning Shipping Strategies: Theory and Evidence from Leading Shipowners (Economia Publishing, ISBN 9789609490542).
- Greek Shipping Miracle (2020), p.145.
- Shipping Finance (various editions).
- Hellenic Shipping Leaders (2000s edition).
- Winning Shipping Strategies – Look Inside Preview (Kerkyra Publications).
