= Tanker (ship) =

Ship designed to transport liquids or gases in bulk

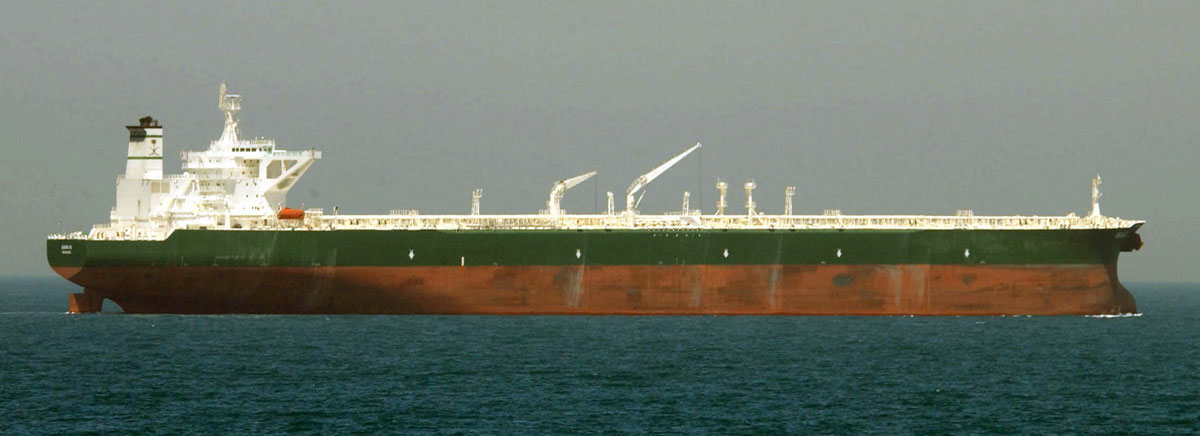
Commercial crude oil supertanker AbQaiq

A tanker (or tank ship or tankship) is a ship designed to transport or store liquids or gases in bulk. Major types of tanker ship include the oil tanker (or petroleum tanker), the chemical tanker, cargo ships, and a gas carrier. Tankers also carry commodities such as vegetable oils, citrus juice, molasses, and wine.

In the United States Navy and Military Sealift Command, a tanker used to refuel other ships is called an oiler (or replenishment oiler if it can also supply dry stores) but many other navies use the terms tanker and replenishment tanker.

Tankers were first developed in the late 19th century as iron and steel hulls and pumping systems were developed. As of 2005, there were just over 4,000 tankers and supertankers 10,000 LT DWT or greater operating worldwide.

== Description ==
Tankers can range in size of capacity from several hundred tons, which includes vessels for servicing small harbours and coastal settlements, to several hundred thousand tons, for long-range haulage. Besides ocean- or seagoing tankers there are also specialized inland-waterway tankers which operate on rivers and canals with an average cargo capacity up to some thousand tons. A wide range of products are carried by tankers, including:

- Hydrocarbon products such as oil, liquefied petroleum gas (LPG), and liquefied natural gas (LNG)
- Chemicals, such as ammonia, chlorine, and styrene monomer
- Fresh water
- Wine
- Molasses
- Citrus juice

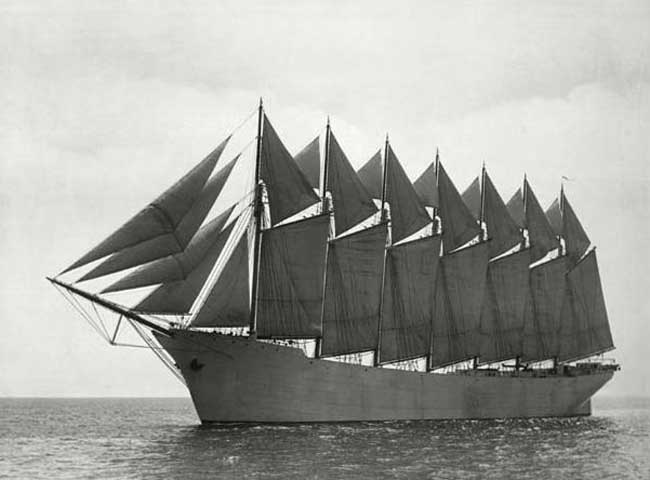
The Thomas W. Lawson (1902), converted in 1906 into the world's first sailing tanker.

Tankers primarily date from the later years of the 19th century. Before this, technology had simply not supported the idea of carrying bulk liquids. The market was also not geared towards transporting or selling cargo in bulk, therefore most ships carried a wide range of different products in different holds and traded outside fixed routes. Liquids were usually loaded in casks—hence the term "tonnage", which refers to the volume of the holds in terms of how many tuns or casks of wine could be carried. Even potable water, vital for the survival of the crew, was stowed in casks. Carrying bulk liquids in earlier ships posed several problems:

- The holds: on timber ships the holds were not sufficiently water, oil or air-tight to prevent a liquid cargo from spoiling or leaking. The development of iron and steel hulls solved this problem.
- Loading and discharging: Bulk liquids must be pumped - the development of efficient pumps and piping systems was vital to the development of the tanker. Steam engines were developed as prime-movers for early pumping systems. Dedicated cargo handling facilities were now required ashore too - as was a market for receiving a product in that quantity. Casks could be unloaded using ordinary cranes, and the awkward nature of the casks meant that the volume of liquid was always relatively small - therefore keeping the market more stable.
- Free surface effect: a large body of liquid carried aboard a ship will affect the ship's stability, particularly when the liquid is flowing around the hold or tank in response to the ship's movements. The effect was negligible in casks, but could cause capsizing if the tank extended the width of the ship; a problem solved by extensive subdivision of the tanks.

Tankers were first used by the oil industry to transfer refined fuel in bulk from refineries to customers. This would then be stored in large tanks ashore, and subdivided for delivery to individual locations. The use of tankers caught on because other liquids were also cheaper to transport in bulk, store in dedicated terminals, then subdivide. Even the Guinness brewery used tankers to transport the stout across the Irish Sea.

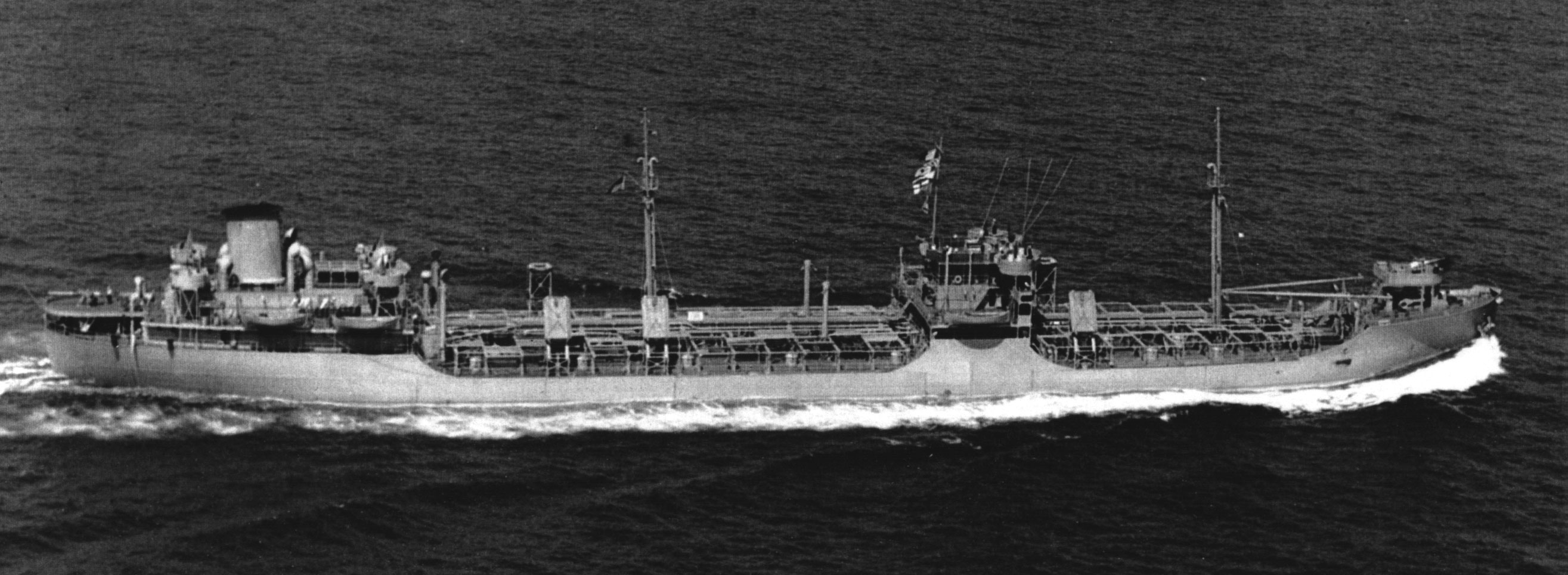
A US Navy T2 tanker in 1943

Different products require different handling and transport, with specialised variants such as "chemical tankers", "oil tankers", and "LNG carriers" developed to handle dangerous chemicals, oil and oil-derived products, and liquefied natural gas respectively. These broad variants may be further differentiated with respect to ability to carry only a single product or simultaneously transport mixed cargoes such as several different chemicals or refined petroleum products. Among oil tankers, supertankers are designed for transporting oil around the Horn of Africa from the Middle East. The supertanker Seawise Giant, scrapped in 2010, was 458 meters (1,503 ft) in length and 69 meters (226 ft) wide. Supertankers are one of the three preferred methods for transporting large quantities of oil, along with pipeline transport and rail.

== Regulations ==
Tighter regulation means that tankers now cause fewer environmental disasters resulting from oil spills than in the 1970s. Amoco Cadiz, Braer, Erika, Exxon Valdez, Prestige and Torrey Canyon were examples of accidents. Oil spills from tankers amounted to around 1,000 tonnes in 2020 from three incidents (an all-time low), down from 636,000 tonnes from 92 incidents in 1979 - a fall of 99.8%.

For ships internationally, the regulations of the International Maritime Organization apply, specifically Annex I, prevention of pollution by oil under MARPOL 73/78 and rules for construction under the SOLAS Convention. These include requirements for inert gas systems designed to supply inert gas to cargo tanks to prevent an explosive atmosphere from being present.

For tankers that are either operate in United States waters or are owned by US based companies, rules govern their design, construction and operation. Specifically under the US Code of Federal Regulations Title 33 - Navigation and Navigable Waters, Title 40 - Protection of Environment, Title 46 - Shipping, Title 47 - Telecommunication and Title 49 - Transportation.

== Design and operational considerations ==
Many modern tankers are designed for a specific cargo and a specific route. Draft is typically limited by the depth of water in loading and unloading harbors; and may be limited by the depth of straits or canals along the preferred shipping route. Cargoes with high vapor pressure at ambient temperatures may require pressurized tanks or vapor recovery systems. Tank heaters may be required to maintain heavy crude oil, residual fuel, asphalt, wax, or molasses in a fluid state for offloading.

Designs will vary by the type of tanker. For oil tankers, systems will need to be in place to manage operational hazards, including a means of producing and introducing inert gas into cargo tanks to prevent explosion. Cargo tanks are typically fitted with the ability to monitor levels of liquid within a tank, as well as an overfill or high level alarm function. For Gas carriers, including LNG carriers, gas design cargo containment systems are required. These should include means to monitor temperature, volume and pressure, as well as pressure relief valves and associated safety systems in accordance with the IGC Code.

Tank lids and joints between pipes may need to be bonded to prevent static electricity from causing an explosion.

The International Safety Guide for Oil Tankers and Terminals is the industry code of practice that applies to oil tankers globally.

== Tanker capacity ==
Tankers used for liquid fuels are classified according to their capacity.

Oil tanker size categories
AFRA Scale		Flexible market scale			
Class	Size in DWT	Class	Size in DWT	New price	Used price
General Purpose tanker	10,000–24,999	Product tanker	10,000–60,000	$43M	$42.5M
Medium Range tanker	25,000–44,999	Panamax	60,000–80,000	$43M	$42.5M
LR1 (Long Range 1)	45,000–79,999	Aframax	80,000–120,000	$60.7M	$58M
LR2 (Long Range 2)	80,000–159,999	Suezmax	120,000–200,000	$60.7M	$58M
VLCC (Very Large Crude Carrier)	160,000–319,999	VLCC	200,000–320,000	$120M	$116M
ULCC (Ultra Large Crude Carrier)	320,000–549,999	ULCC	320,000–550,000	$120M	$116M

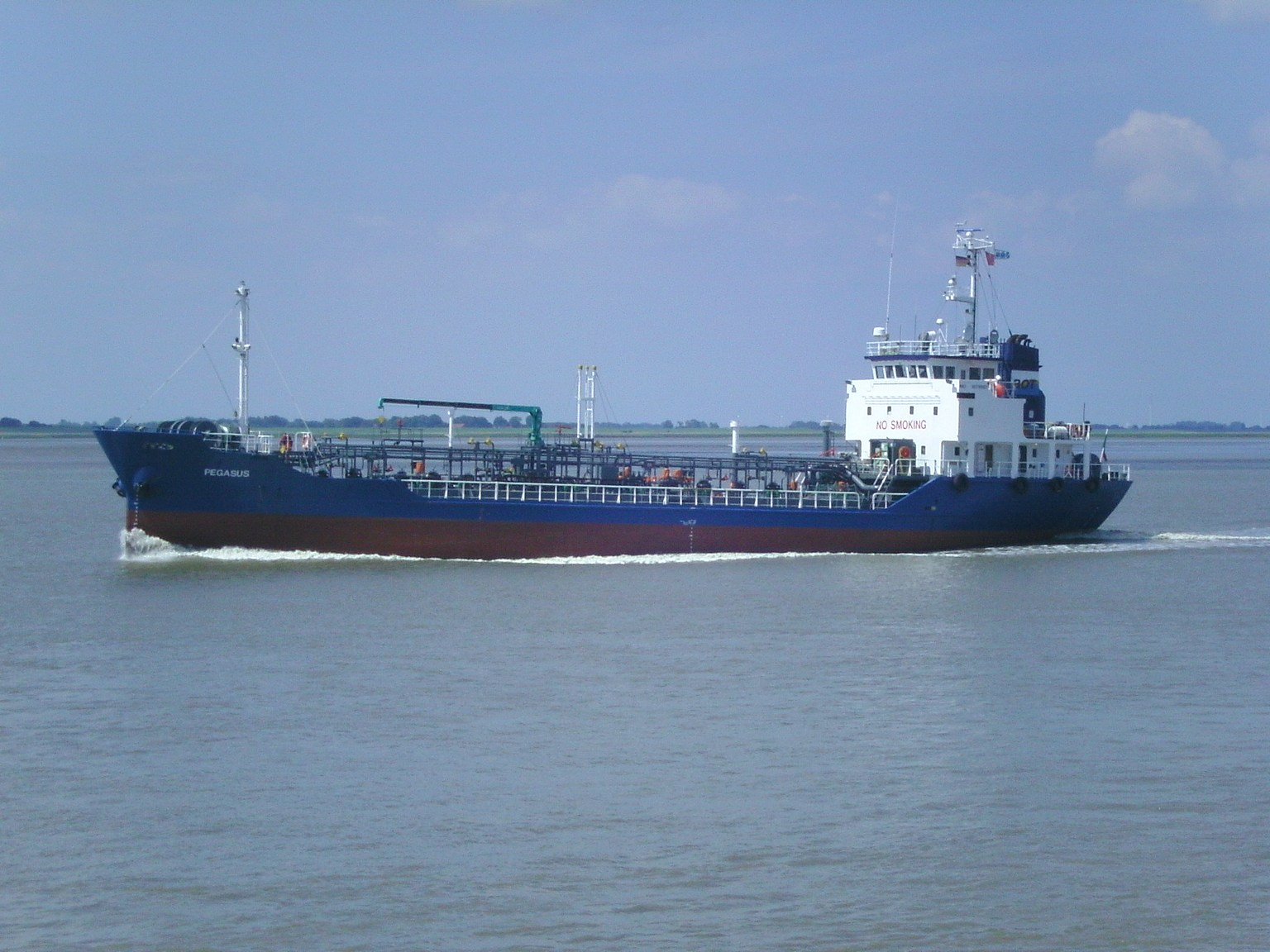
The small coastal tanker Pegasus on the River Weser

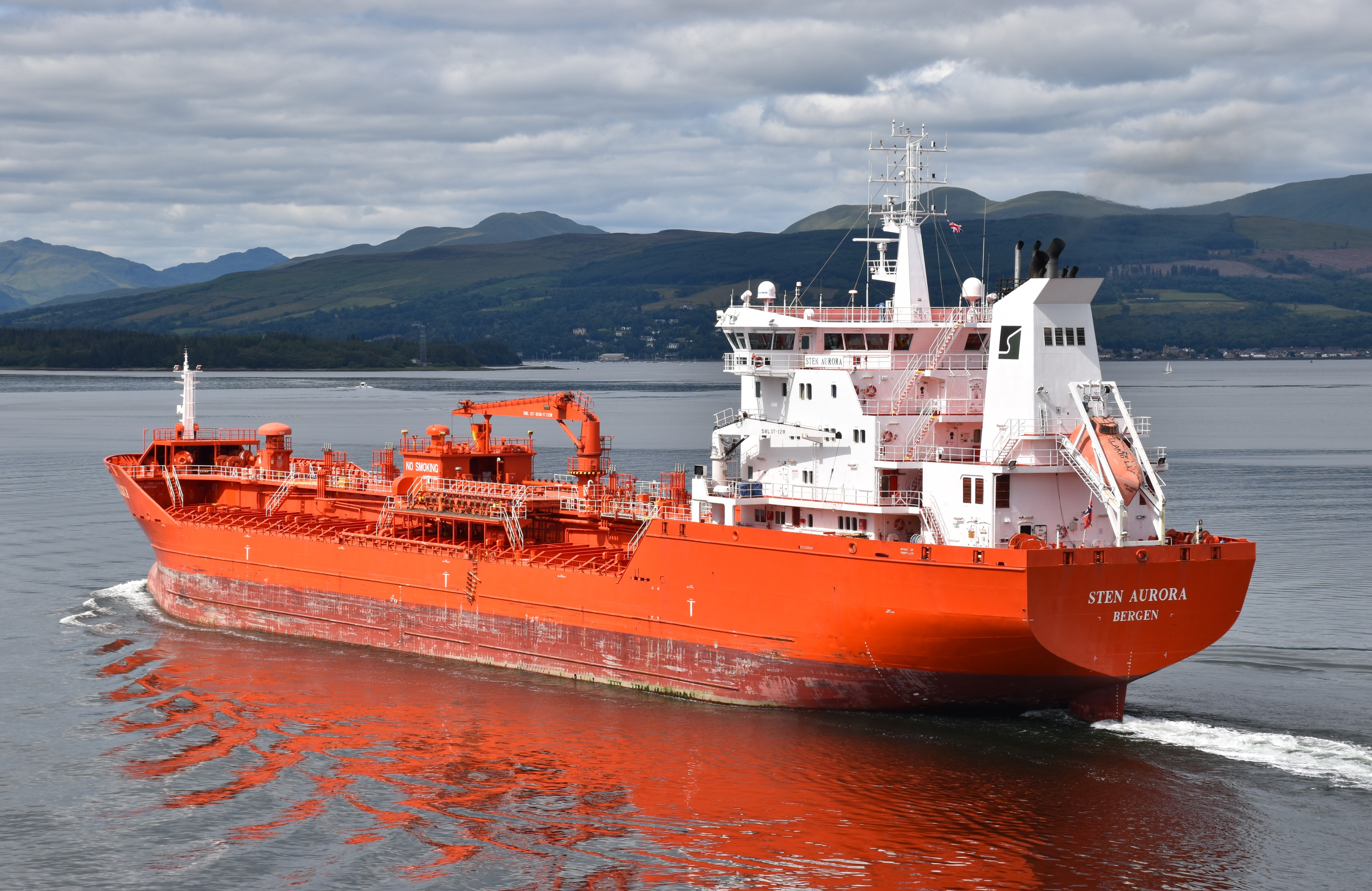
Chemical tanker Sten Aurora on the Firth of Clyde

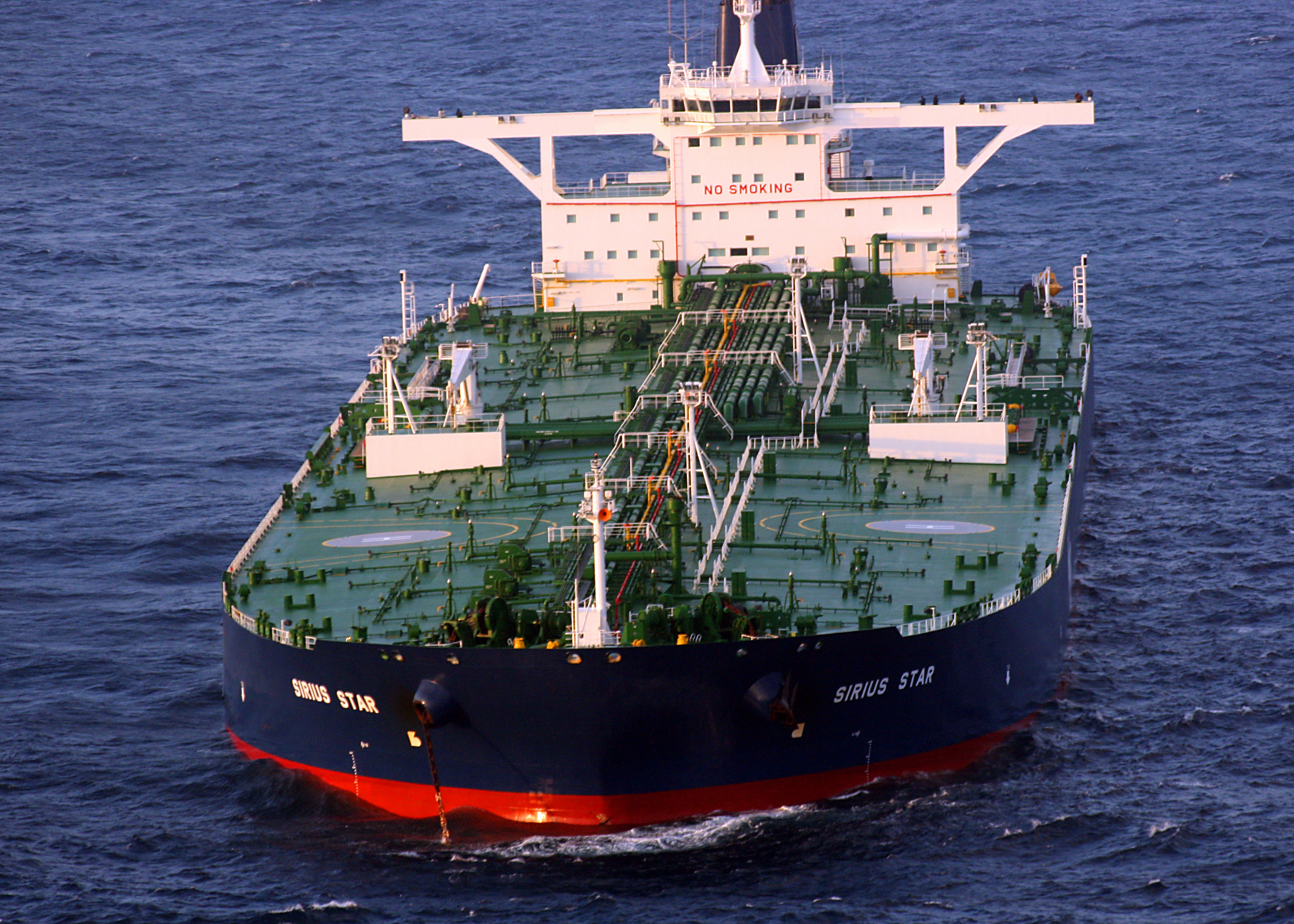
The Very Large Crude Carrier (VLCC) MV Sirius Star in 2008, after her capture by Somali pirates

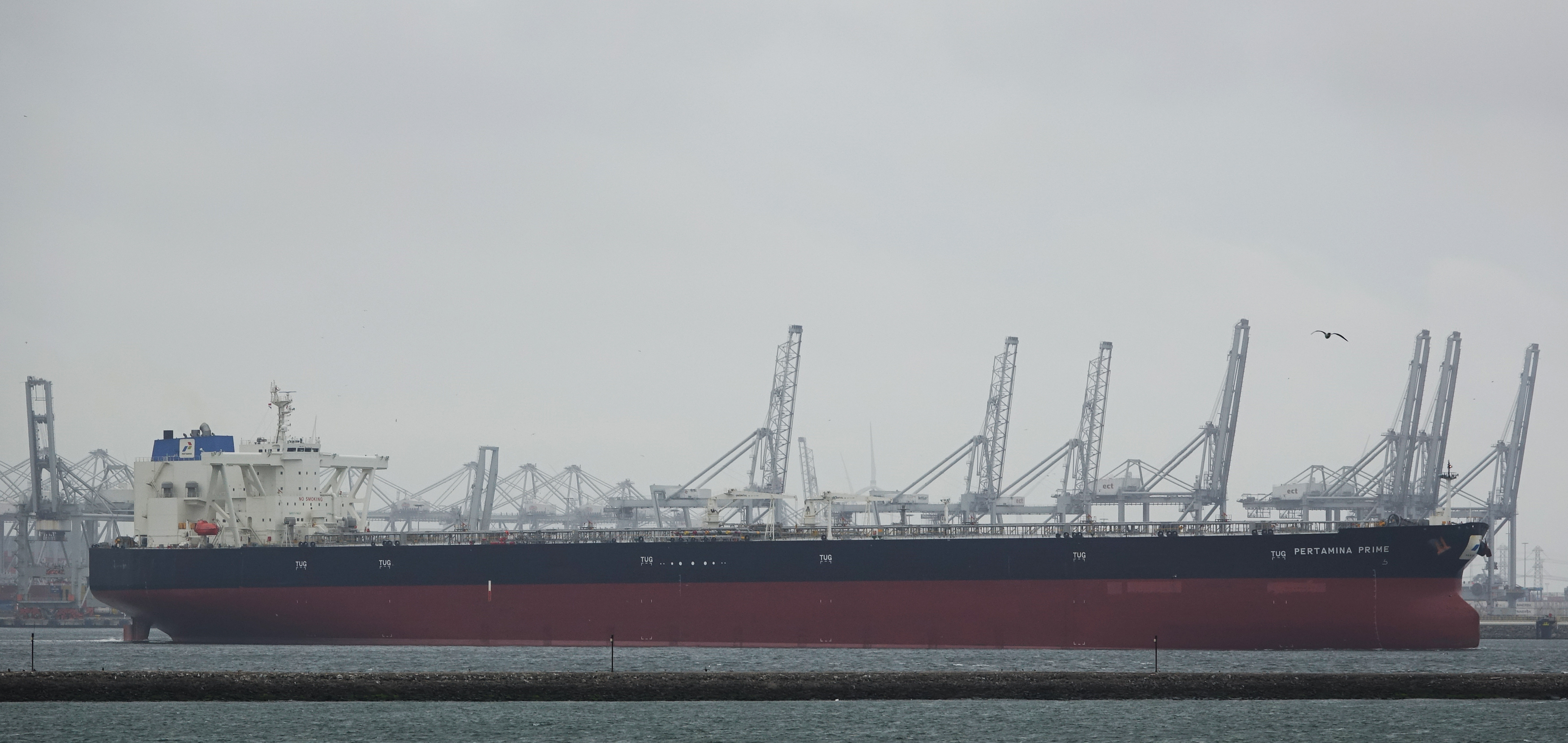
Pertamina Prime ship is currently stopping in the Netherlands

In 1954, Shell Oil developed the average freight rate assessment (AFRA) system, which classifies tankers of different sizes. To make it an independent instrument, Shell consulted the London Tanker Brokers' Panel (LTBP). At first, they divided the groups as General Purpose for tankers under 25,000 tons deadweight (DWT); Medium Range for ships between 25,000 and 45,000 DWT and Large Range (later Long Range) for the then-enormous ships that were larger than 45,000 DWT. The ships became larger during the 1970s, and the list was extended, where the tons are metric tonnes:

Very Large Crude Carrier size range

At nearly 380 vessels in the size range 279,000 t DWT to 320,000 t DWT, these are by far the most popular size range among the larger VLCCs. Only seven vessels are larger than this, and approximately 90 between 220,000 t DWT and 279,000 t DWT.

== Fleets of the world ==
Flag states

As of 2005, the United States Maritime Administration's statistics count 4,024 tankers of 10,000 LT DWT or greater worldwide. 2,582 of these are double-hulled. Panama is the leading flag state of tankers, with 592 registered ships. Five other flag states have more than two hundred registered tankers: Liberia (520), The Marshall Islands (323), Greece (233), Singapore (274) and The Bahamas (215). These flag states are also the top six in terms of fleet size in terms of deadweight tonnage.

Largest fleets

As of 2026, Greece, China, and Japan are the top three owners of tankers by value, at $77bn, $56bn, and $48bn respectively, while China owns the most tankers overall with 2,039.

Builders

Asian companies dominate the construction of tankers. Of the world's 4,024 tankers, 2,822 (over 70%) were built in South Korea, Japan and China.

== Petroleum Tables ==
Petroleum Tables, a book by William Davies, an early tanker captain, was published in 1903, although Davies had printed earlier versions himself. Including his calculations on the expansion and contraction of bulk oil, and other information for tanker officers, it went into multiple editions, and in 1915 The Petroleum World commented that it was "the standard book for computations and conversions." For modern tables, the standard guide for petroleum measurement on oil tankers are those from ASTM International specifically ASTM D1250-08.

== See also ==
- History of the oil tanker
- Hydrogen tanker
- List of gas carriers
- List of tankers
- T1 tanker
- T2 tanker
- T3 Tanker

== Bibliography ==
- Cambridge Systematics (1998). Multimodal corridor and capacity analysis manual. Transportation Research Board. ISBN 978-0-309-06072-1.
- Central Intelligence Agency (2007). CIA World Factbook 2008. New York: Skyhorse Publishing. ISBN 978-1-60239-080-5.
- Hayler, William B.; Keever, John M. (2003). American Merchant Seaman's Manual. Centerville, MD: Cornell Maritime Press. ISBN 0-87033-549-9.
- Morrell, Robert W. (1931). Oil Tankers (Second ed.). New York: Simmons-Boardman Publishing Company.
- Muller, Gerhardt (1998). "Transportation Modes". In Tompkins, James A.; Smith, Jerry D. (eds.). Warehouse Management Handbook (2nd ed.). Tompkins Press. ISBN 978-0-9658659-1-3.
- Muller, Gerhardt (1995). Intermodal freight transportation (3rd ed.). Intermodal Association of North America.
- Redwood, Boverton (1911). "Petroleum" . In Chisholm, Hugh (ed.). Encyclopædia Britannica. Vol. 21 (11th ed.). Cambridge University Press. pp. 316–322.
- Seyoum, Belay (2008). "Trade documents and Transportation". Export–Import Theory, Practices, and Procedures (2nd ed.). Taylor & Francis. ISBN 978-0-7890-3419-9.
- Turpin, Edward A.; McEwen, William A. (1980). Merchant Marine Officers' Handbook (Fourth ed.). Centreville, MD: Cornell Maritime Press. ISBN 0870333798.
- Watts, Philip (1911). "Ship" . In Chisholm, Hugh (ed.). Encyclopædia Britannica. Vol. 24 (11th ed.). Cambridge University Press. pp. 880–970.
- Wiltshire, Andrew (2008). Looking Back at Classic Tankers. Bristol, England: Bernard McCall. ISBN 9781902953366.
