= Division officer =

Military rank

A division officer (known as a divisional officer in the UK) commands a shipboard division of enlisted personnel, and is typically the lowest ranking officer in their administrative chain of command. Enlisted personnel aboard United States Navy warships are assigned to a division according to their shipboard responsibilities. Small shipboard departments may have a single division in which the department head serves as the division officer, while larger departments on larger ships may have several divisions with division officers reporting to a department head. Department heads report to the commanding officer through the executive officer.

== Responsibilities ==
Division officers maintain and display in conspicuous locations copies of all division orders including watch, quarter, station, fire, collision, and abandon ship bills. Division officers personally instruct their division during prescribed drills, while giving their petty officers opportunities to become proficient in leadership. Division officers inspect division compartments and equipment for cleanliness, preservation, and operational readiness.

Division officers are responsible for safety precautions to prevent accidents while overseeing training of division personnel to prepare them for battle. Division officers encourage and assist personnel under their supervision to obtain knowledge for advancement in rating. While inspecting division personnel for appearance and behavior, division officers instruct those needing correction and may report those guilty of infractions of regulations for punishment by higher authority.

== Sources ==
- Stavridis, James G.; Girrier, Robert; Heames, Jeffrey; Ogden, Thomas (2017). Division Officer's Guide (12th ed.). Annapolis, Maryland: United States Naval Institute. ISBN 1682471721.
- Noel, John V. (1952). The Division Officer's Guide: A Handbook For All Young Naval Officers (1st ed.). Annapolis, Maryland: United States Naval Institute.
