= Gas carrier =

Ship designed to transport liquefied chemical gases in bulk

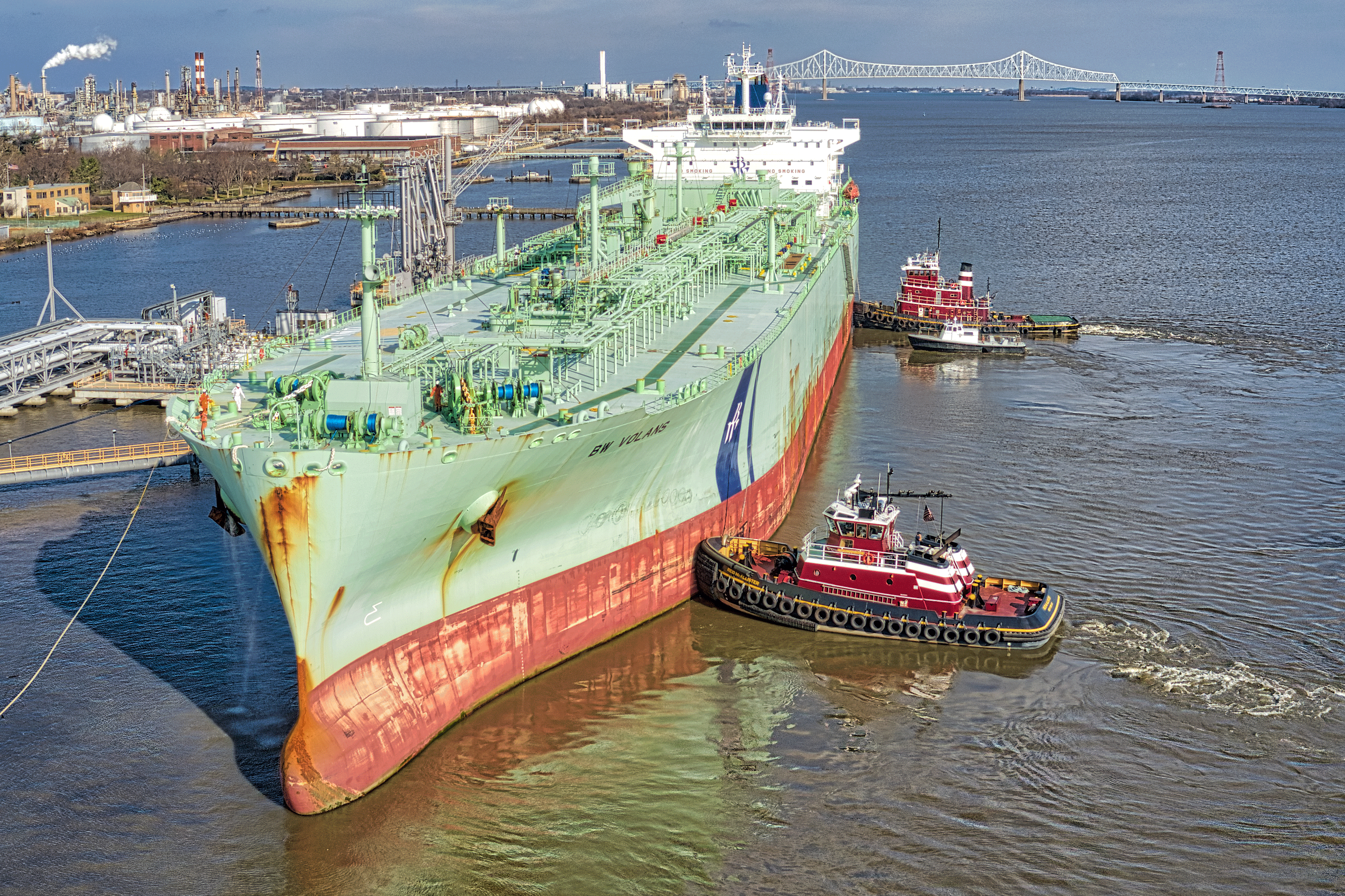
The tugboats Reid McAllister and McAllister Responder push the LPG tanker BW Volans into port at Marcus Hook, on the Delaware River.

A gas carrier, gas tanker, LPG carrier, or LPG tanker is a ship designed to transport LPG, LNG, CNG, or liquefied chemical gases in bulk. Gases are kept refrigerated onboard the ships to enable safe carriage in liquid and vapour form and for this reason, gas carriers usually have onboard refrigeration systems. Design and construction of all gas carriers operating internationally is regulated by the International Maritime Organization through the International Code of the Construction and Equipment of Ships Carrying Liquefied Gases in Bulk. There are various types of gas carriers, depending on the type of gas carried and the type of containment system, two of the most common being the Moss Type B (spherical) type and the membrane (typically GTT) type.

== Types ==
=== Fully pressurized gas carrier ===
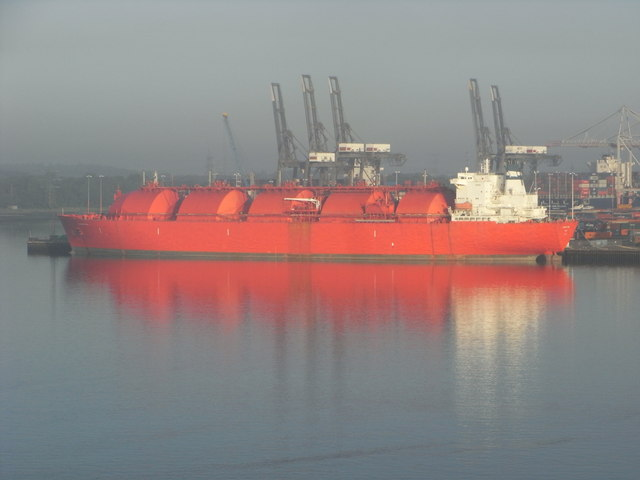
Moss type LNG tanker

The seaborne transport of liquefied gases began in 1934 when a major international company put two combined oil/LPG tankers into operation. The ships, basically oil tankers, had been converted by fitting small, riveted, pressure vessels for the carriage of LPG into cargo tank spaces. This enabled transport over long distances of substantial volumes of an oil refinery by-product that had distinct advantages as a domestic and commercial fuel. LPG is not only odourless and non-toxic, it also has a high calorific value and a low sulphur content, making it very clean and efficient when being burnt.

Today, most fully pressurised oceangoing LPG carriers are fitted with 3-5 spherical or cylindrical cargo tanks, and have typical capacities between 20,000 m^{3} and 90,000 m^{3}. The overall length typically ranges from 140 m to 229 m. New LPG carrier ships are usually designed for dual-fuel propulsion systems, which give the ship the ability to run on diesel or LPG. Fully pressurized ships are still being built in numbers and represent a cost-effective and simple way of moving LPG to and from smaller gas terminals.

=== Semi-pressurised ships ===
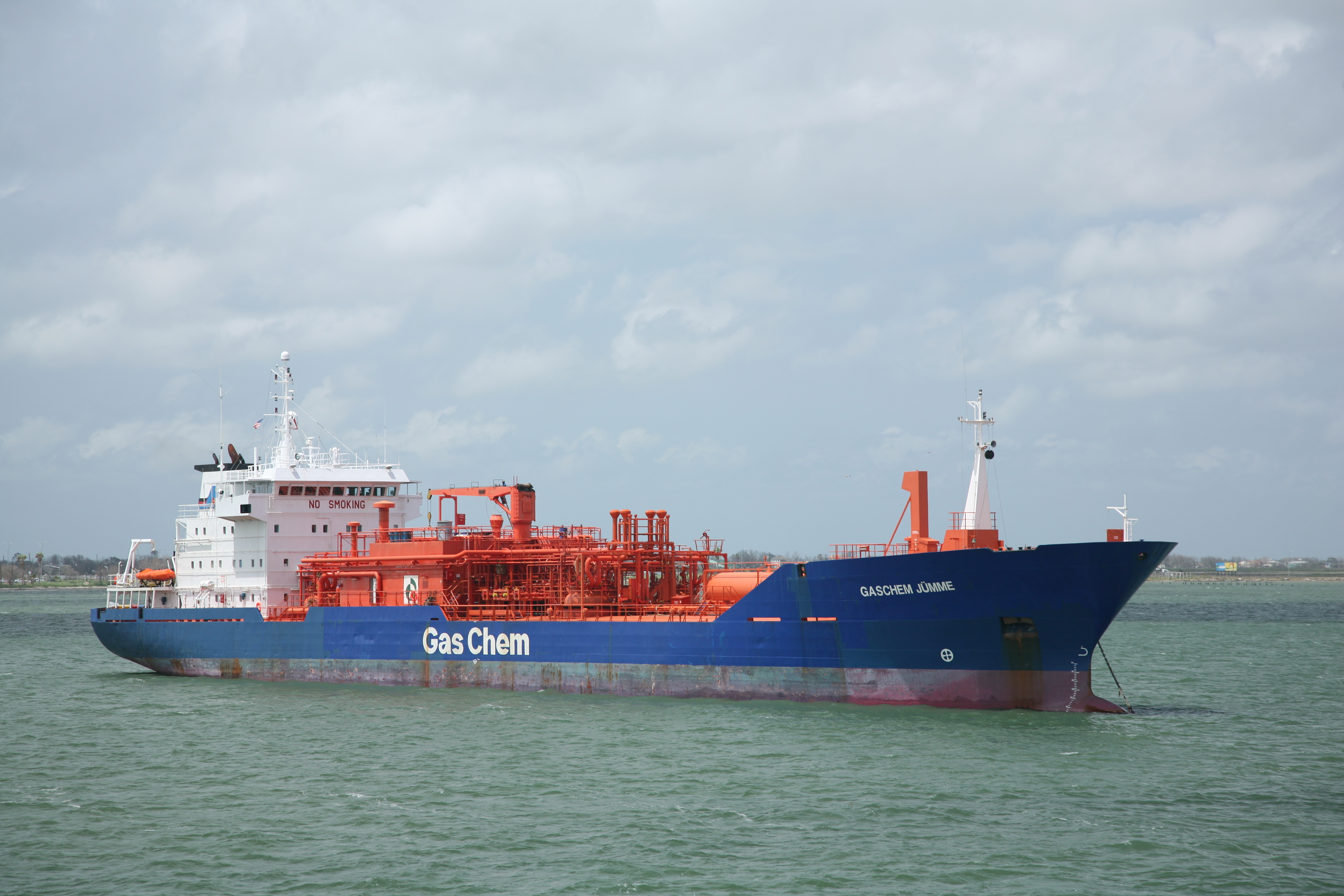
Semi-pressurised ship Gaschem Jümme

These ships carried gases in a semi-pressurized/semi-refrigerated state. This approach provides flexibility, as these carriers are able to load or discharge at both refrigerated and pressurized storage facilities. Semi-pressurized/semi-refrigerated carriers incorporate cylindrical, spherical or bi-lobe shaped tanks carrying propane at a pressure of 8.5 kg/cm^{2} (121 psi), and a temperature of −10 °C (14 °F).

22,000 cbm Semi-Refrigerated LPG Carrier Navigator Centauri transits Porpoise Bay

=== Ethylene and gas/chemical carriers ===
LEG carriers are the most sophisticated of the gas tankers and have the ability to carry not only most other liquefied gas cargoes but also ethylene at its atmospheric boiling point of −104 °C (−155 °F). These ships feature cylindrical, insulated, stainless steel cargo tanks able to accommodate cargoes up to a maximum specific gravity of 1.8 at temperatures ranging from a minimum of −104 °C to a maximum of +80 °C (176 °F) and at a maximum tank pressure of 4 bar.

=== Fully refrigerated ships ===
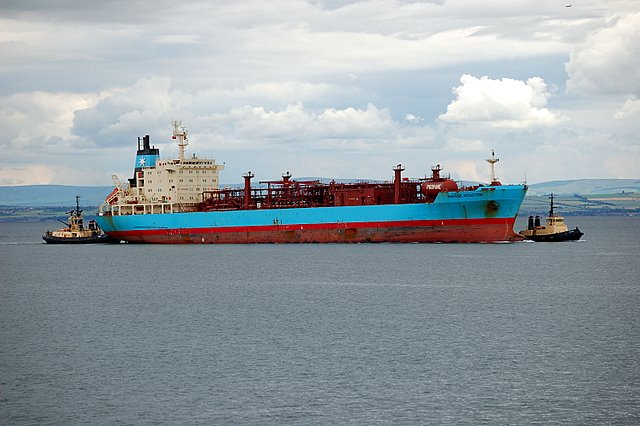
Fully refrigerated ship LPG/C Maersk Houston

They are built to carry liquefied gases at low temperature and atmospheric pressure between terminals equipped with fully refrigerated storage tanks. However, discharge through a booster pump and cargo heater makes it possible to discharge to pressurized tanks too. The first purpose-built, lpg tanker was the m/t Rasmus Tholstrup from a Swedish shipyard to a Danish design. Prismatic tanks enabled the ship's cargo carrying capacity to be maximised, thus making fully refrigerated ships highly suitable for carrying large volumes of cargo such as LPG, ammonia and vinyl chloride over long distances. Today, fully refrigerated ships range in capacity from 20,000 to 100,000 m^{3} (710,000 to 3,530,000 cu ft). LPG carriers in the 50,000–80,000 m^{3} (1,800,000–2,800,000 cu ft) size range are often referred to as VLGCs (Very Large Gas Carriers). Although LNG carriers are often larger in terms of cubic capacity, this term is normally only applied to fully refrigerated LPG carriers.

The main type of cargo containment system utilised on board modern fully refrigerated ships are independent tanks with rigid foam insulation. The insulation used is quite commonly polyurethane foam. Older ships can have independent tanks with loosely filled perlite insulation. In the past, there have been a few fully refrigerated ships built with semi-membrane or integral tanks and internal insulation tanks, but these systems have only maintained minimal interest. The large majority of such ships currently in service have been constructed by shipbuilders in Japan and Korea.

=== Liquefied natural gas carriers ===
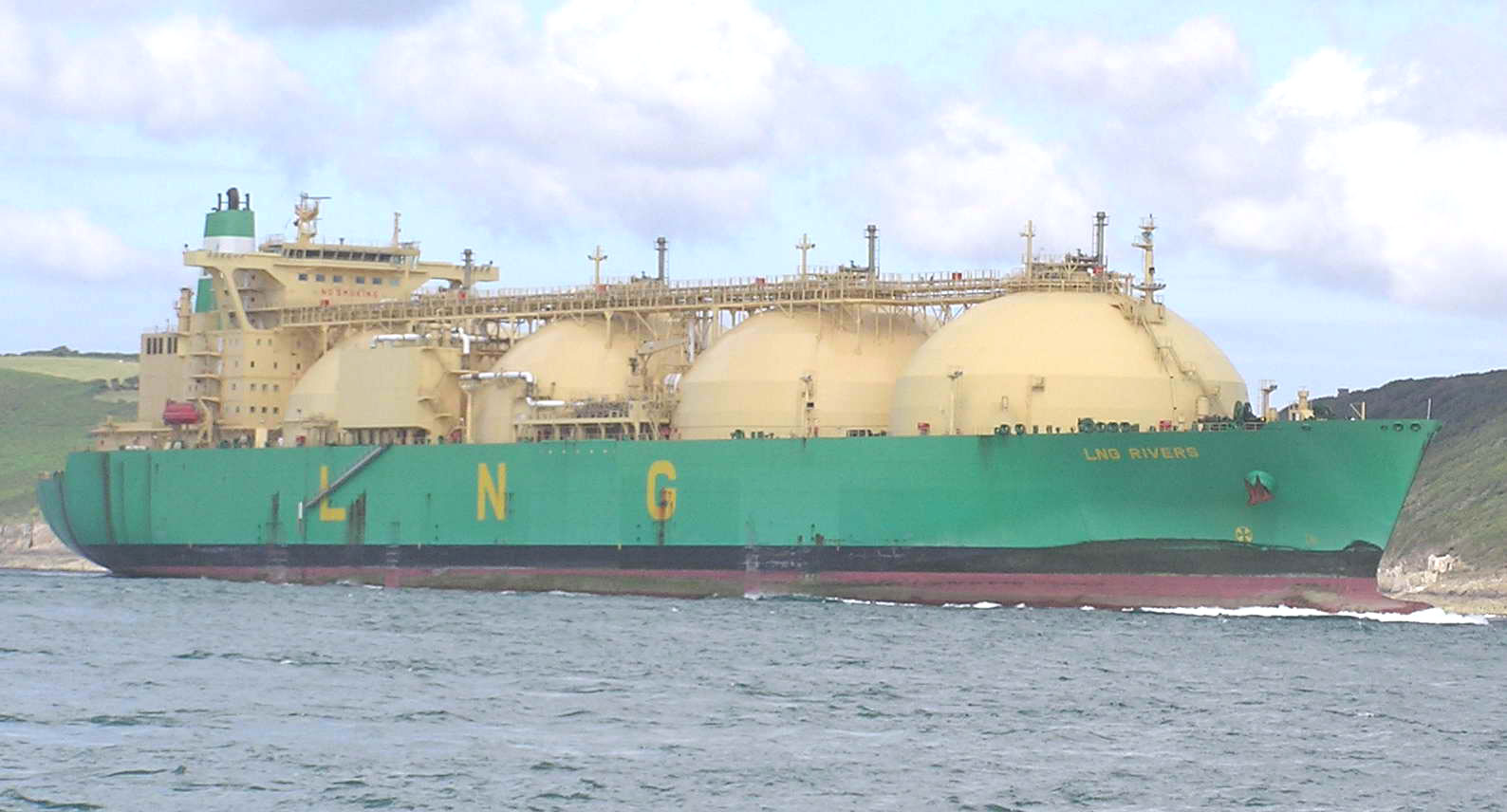
LNG Rivers, a Moss-type carrier with a capacity of 135,000 cubic metres (4,770,000 cu ft)

An LNG carrier is a tank ship designed for transporting liquefied natural gas (LNG). It is designed to transport LNG at cryogenic temperatures of around -162°C (-260°F). These vessels use heavily insulated containment systems, with membrane or spherical tanks, to keep gas in liquid form, reducing its volume 600 times. This enables safe, efficient, sea transport from liquefaction plants to import terminals, especially between locations not connected by pipelines, such as supplying Asia and Europe from gas-producing regions.

Typically, modern LNG carriers use the natural gas they carry as fuel, enhancing efficiency. A Gas Combustion Unit (GCU) is often used to manage gas that vaporizes during transit.

The first oceangoing liquified natural gas tanker in the world was Methane Pioneer, which entered service in 1959 with a carrying capacity of 5,500 cubic metres (190,000 cu ft). LNG carriers have increased in size to giant Q-Max LNG ships that can carry up to 266,000 m^{3} (9,400,000 cu ft). As of 2023, there were 772 active LNG carriers in the world.

=== Compressed natural gas carriers ===
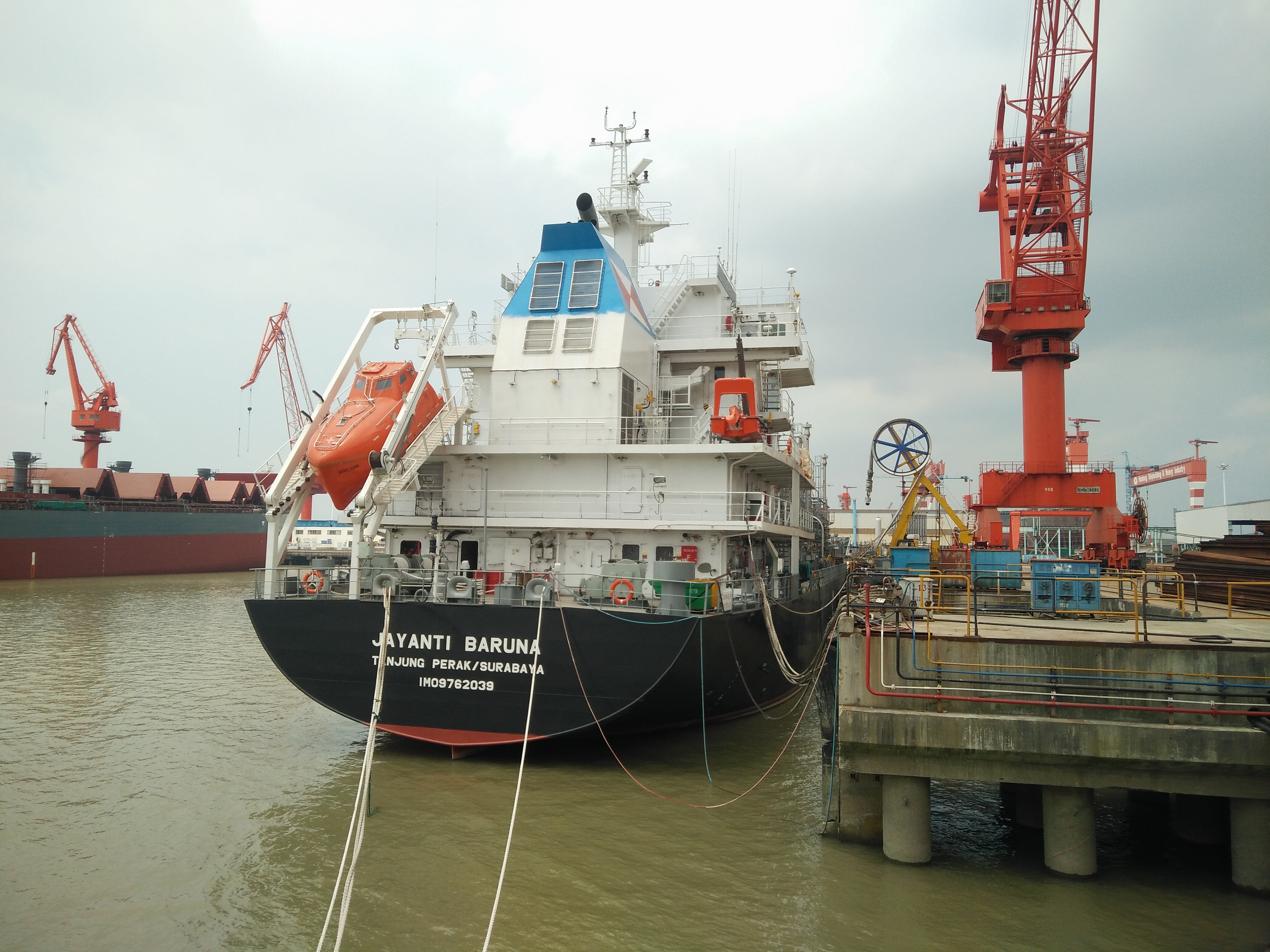
Jayanti Baruna - CNG Cargo Carrier

Compressed natural gas (CNG) carrier ships are designed for transportation of natural gas under high pressure. CNG carrier technology relies on high pressure, typically over 250 bar (2900 psi), to increase the density of the gas and maximize the possible commercial payload. CNG carriers are economical for medium distance marine transport and rely on the adoption of suitable pressure vessels to store CNG during transport and on the use of suitable loading and unloading compressors to receive the CNG at the loading terminal and to deliver the CNG at the unloading terminal.

== Builders ==
These vessels are designed to transport liquefied gas. Builders of Liquefied Gas Carriers are:

- Daewoo Shipbuilding & Marine
- Damen Shipyard
- Hyundai Heavy Industries
- Hyundai Mipo
- Hyundai Samho Heavy Industries
- Jiangnan
- Kawasaki Shipbuilding Corporation
- Mitsubishi Heavy Industries
- Imabari Shipbuilding
- Japan Marine United Corporation

South Korea, Japan and China are the main countries where LPG tankers are built, with small numbers built in the Netherlands and Bangladesh.

== Cargoes carried on gas carriers ==
- Butadiene
- Ethylene
- LPG
- LNG
- CNG
- Propylene
- Chemical gases such as ammonia, vinyl chloride, ethylene oxide, propylene oxide and chlorine.

== Gas carrier codes ==
The International Maritime Organization (IMO) has established three principal regulatory frameworks for gas carriers, based on their build dates. These ensure safety, environmental protection, and update with evolving fuel technologies.

=== Gas carriers built on or after 1 July 1986 (IGC Code) ===
Gas carriers constructed from this date are governed by the International Code for the Construction and Equipment of Ships Carrying Liquefied Gases in Bulk (IGC Code), mandated under SOLAS and enforced through the International Certificate of Fitness carried onboard.

Amendments & developments:

- 1993: Major updates effective 1 July 1994.
- 2016: Amendments per IMO Resolution MSC.370(93) effective 1 January 2016.
- 2024–2025: Updates mandating digital tank and pressure monitoring, enhanced insulation standards, and integration for alternative fuels.
- Resolution MSC.475(102): Introduces updated requirements for welding certifications on tanks and pressure vessels, effective 1 January 2024.
- Resolution MSC.566(109): Adds new Chapter 16 enabling the use of liquefied ammonia as a bunker fuel on IGC-class vessels. Entry into force: 1 July 2026; voluntary adoption encouraged from adoption date.
- IMO CCC Sub‑Committee (Sept 2024): Issued interim guidelines for ammonia as fuel and completed IGC Code review. Work continues on hydrogen and low-flashpoint fuel provisions.

=== Gas carriers built between 1 July 1976 and 30 June 1986 (GC Code) ===
These vessels follow the "Code for the Construction and Equipment of Ships Carrying Liquefied Gases in Bulk" (GC Code), adopted in 1975.

- Voluntary under SOLAS, but often enforced domestically.
- Multiple amendments since 1975, with the last major revision in 1993.
- Compliance is frequently demonstrated via the Certificate of Fitness, even when not legally obligatory.

=== Gas carriers built before 1 July 1976 (Existing Ship Code) ===
Earlier vessels adhere to the 1976 Code for Existing Ships Carrying Liquefied Gases in Bulk.

- Less prescriptive than later codes, reflecting older technology.
- Not mandatory under SOLAS, but enforced through national laws and port state control.
- The Certificate of Fitness is often required by charterers and port authorities.

=== Overview of IGC Code 2024–2026 Key Updates ===
Topic	Description
Digital Monitoring & Data	Mandatory remote tank sensors for pressure, temperature, and volume; automated alerting systems.
Welding & Materials	New welding qualifications and testing protocols under MSC.475(102) from 1 Jan 2024.
Fuel Flexibility	Addition of Chapter 16 to permit ammonia use; applies to vessels built ≥2016, effective 1 Jul 2026.
Insulation & Safety	Tougher thermal insulation standards to reduce boil‑off; new venting configurations.
Enclosed Space & Emergency	Enhanced procedures for enclosed space entry, oxygen displacement, and escape routes.
Alternative Fuel Guidelines	Interim IMO guidance for hydrogen and other low-flashpoint fuels; implementation expected in 2025–2026.

=== Regulatory Path Forward ===
- Vessels built before 2016: Not required to adopt ammonia as fuel until 1 July 2026, but voluntary compliance encouraged.
- Capacity-building efforts by IMO to assist developing countries with implementation of digital and new safety technologies.

== Cargo Containment Systems ==
For gas carriers, including LNG carriers, cargo containment systems are required in accordance with the provisions of the International Code for the Construction and Equipment of Ships Carrying Liquefied Gases in Bulk (IGC Code). These systems must include means for monitoring temperature, volume, and pressure, as well as pressure relief valves and associated safety devices.

A cargo containment system is the total arrangement for containing cargo, including where fitted:

- A primary barrier (the cargo tank)
- A secondary barrier (if required)
- Associated thermal insulation
- Any intervening spaces
- Adjacent structural elements necessary for support

For cargoes carried at temperatures between −55 and −10 °C (−67 and 14 °F), the ship's hull may act as the secondary barrier, forming a boundary of the hold space. For LNG (−163 °C), the secondary barrier is structurally independent.

The main cargo tank types used on gas carriers are:

=== Independent Tanks ===
==== Independent Type 'A' ====
Type A tanks are prismatic and supported on wooden or composite chocks within the hold space. They are normally divided by a centerline bulkhead, and feature chamfered top edges to reduce free surface effects and improve stability. These tanks are generally used for LPG or ammonia. For LPG cargoes (−50 °C), tanks are made of low-carbon manganese steel or stainless steel. For LNG carriage, materials such as 9% nickel steel or aluminium are required. The hold space is filled with dry inert gas or nitrogen. The Maximum Allowable Relief Valve Setting (MARVS) is less than 0.7 bar.

==== Independent Type 'B' ====
Type B tanks are typically spherical (Moss-type) or prismatic (SPB-type). These tanks are fully supported by a skirt or foundation and incorporate comprehensive stress analysis. Type B systems are used for LNG and allow for reduced secondary barriers. In recent developments, cylindrical and prismatic Type B tanks have been revived and approved by classification societies including ABS, Lloyd’s Register, and Bureau Veritas. Materials include 9% nickel steel or aluminium. The MARVS is less than 0.7 bar.

==== Independent Type 'C' ====
Type C tanks are cylindrical or spherical pressure vessels, mounted either on deck, below deck, or partially enclosed. These tanks are used for LPG, ethylene, and small-scale LNG carriers, including LNG bunkering vessels and dual-fuel supply ships. For ethylene, tanks are typically made from 5% nickel steel. The MARVS is greater than 0.7 bar. Recent developments emphasize Type C's role in green shipping and LNG-fueled vessels.

=== Membrane Systems ===
Membrane systems consist of a thin membrane (usually stainless steel or Invar) supported by insulation directly attached to the ship’s inner hull. These systems are widely used in large LNG carriers.

The latest generation — GTT NEXT1 — received full design approval and GASA certification in 2024. It offers enhanced thermal efficiency and mechanical strength, rivalling the older Mark III Flex+ systems.

=== Semi-Membrane Systems ===
Semi-membrane tanks are a hybrid of membrane and independent tank concepts. Their structure allows partial support from the inner hull and partial free-standing expansion. These systems are now formally recognized under the IGC Code.

=== Other Types ===
Some other containment designs have been approved but not widely adopted commercially. These include:

- Internal insulation Type '1'
- Internal insulation Type '2'
- Integral tanks

=== Digital Integration and Environmental Monitoring ===
New-generation containment systems increasingly include digital monitoring for cargo performance, emissions control, and voyage optimization. GTT has integrated smart services (including remote tank monitoring and boil-off gas management) through its acquisition of Danelec Marine. DNV also recommends systems capable of containing boil-off gas for at least 15 days using reliquefaction or oxidation units to meet stricter emissions standards.

== Hazards on gas carriers ==
- Toxicity

Vinyl chloride commonly carried on gas carriers is a known as a human carcinogen, particularly liver cancer. It is not only dangerous when inhaled but can also be absorbed by the skin. Skin irritation and watering of the eyes indicate dangerous levels of VCM may be present in the atmosphere. Caution must be exerted while dealing with such cargoes, precautions such as use of Chemical suits Self-contained Breathing Apparatus (SCBA's) and gas tight goggles must be worn at all times to prevent exposure. Chlorine and ammonia are other toxic cargoes carried.

- Flammability

Almost all cargo vapours are flammable. When ignition occurs, it is not the liquid which burns but the evolved vapour that burns. Flameless explosions which result out of cold cargo liquid coming into sudden contact with water do not release much energy. Pool fires which are the result of a leaked pool of cargo liquid catching fire and jet fires which are the result of the leak catching fire are grave hazards. Flash fires occur when there is a leak and does not ignite immediately but after the vapours travel some distance downwind and getting ignited and are extremely dangerous. Vapour cloud explosions and boiling liquid expanding vapor explosions are the most grave flammability hazards on gas carriers.

- Frostbite

The cargoes are carried at extremely low temperatures, from 0 to −163 °C (32 to −261 °F), and hence frostbite due to exposure of skin to the cold vapours or liquid is a very real hazard.

- Asphyxia

Asphyxia occurs when the blood cannot take a sufficient supply of oxygen to the brain. A person affected may experience headache, dizziness and inability to concentrate, followed by loss of consciousness. In sufficient concentrations any vapour may cause asphyxiation, whether toxic or not.

== Health effects of specific cargoes carried on gas carriers ==
- Hazards of ammonia

1. Exposure to more than 2,000 ppm – fatal in 30 minutes, 6,000 ppm – fatal in minutes, 10,000 ppm – fatal and intolerable to unprotected skin.

2. Anhydrous ammonia is not dangerous when handled properly, but if not handled carefully it can be extremely dangerous. It is not as combustible as many other products that we use and handle every day. However, concentrations of gas burn and require precautions to avoid fires.

3. Mild exposure can cause irritation to eye, nose and lung tissues. Prolonged breathing can cause suffocation. When large amounts are inhaled, the throat swells shut and victims suffocate. Exposure to vapours or liquid also can cause blindness

4. The water-absorbing nature of anhydrous ammonia that causes the greatest injury (especially to the eyes, nose, throat or lungs), and which can cause permanent damage. It is a colourless gas at atmospheric pressure and normal temperature, but under pressure readily changes into a liquid. Anhydrous ammonia has a high affinity for water. Anhydrous ammonia is a hygroscopic compound, this means it will seek moisture source that may be the body of the operator, which is composed of 90 percent water. When a human body is exposed to anhydrous ammonia the chemical freeze burns its way into the skin, eyes or lungs. This attraction places the eyes, lungs, and skin at greatest risk because of their high moisture content. Caustic burns result when the anhydrous ammonia dissolves into body tissue. Most deaths from anhydrous ammonia are caused by severe damage to the throat and lungs from a direct blast to the face. An additional concern is the low boiling point of anhydrous ammonia. The chemical freezes on contact at room temperature. It will cause burns similar to, but more severe than, those caused by dry ice. If exposed to severe cold flesh will become frozen. At first, the skin will become red (but turn subsequently white); the affected area is painless, but hard to touch, if left untreated the flesh will die and may become gangrenous.

5. The human eye is a complex organ made up of about 80 percent water. Ammonia under pressure can cause extensive, almost immediate damage to the eye. The ammonia extracts the fluid and destroys eye cells and tissue in minutes.

6. Draining of ammonia into sea while pre-cooling of the hard-arm or during disconnection operations is not an eco-friendly operation. As a small quantity of ammonia as low as 0.45 mg/L (1.6×10^{−8} lb/cu in)(LC50) is hazardous to Salmon as per ICSC, USA. Consumption of such fish could be dangerous to humans.

== See also ==
- IGF Code
- List of gas carriers
- List of tankers
- LNG carrier
- Merchant navy
