= International Code of the Construction and Equipment of Ships Carrying Liquefied Gases in Bulk =

Maritime safety standard

The International Code of the Construction and Equipment of Ships Carrying Liquefied Gases in Bulk, often referred and abbreviated as the IGC Code, is the International Maritime Organization (IMO) standard concerning the cargo carriage of liquefied gases in maritime transport. The Code covers gases carried by gas carriers at sea and cargoes include liquefied natural gas and liquefied petroleum gas.

== Content and application ==
The IGC Code is mandatory under the SOLAS Convention, specifically Chapter VII. It applies to ships carrying liquefied gases with the characteristics described in the Code (listed in Chapter 19 of the 2016 edition) and has been in force since 1 July 1986.

Prior to 1986, older gas carriers constructed prior to 1 July 1986 comply with the requirements of the older Code for the Construction Equipment of Ships Carrying Liquefied Gases in Bulk (IGC Code) and the Code for Existing Ships Carrying Liquefied Gases in Bulk (EGC Code).

The Code includes design and construction standards, and equipment requirements. The Code also covers technical subjects such as cargo tanks and cargo containment, ship arrangements, pressure vessels, vapour and pressure piping systems, materials, controls and instrumentation, venting, fire protection, filling limits and other special requirements. The Code also sets out requirements for emergency shutdown (ESD) systems for when liquefied gas cargoes are carried in bulk.

Section 4.1 of the IGC Code defines several types of tanks that can carry liquefied gases. These include independent tanks (of which there are three types, A, B and C), membrane tanks, integral tanks and semi-membrane tanks.

== Updates ==
In 2008, a new industry group met to decide how to revise the Code. Updates were adopted to the Code at MSC 93 in May 2014. The Code was extensively updated on 1 January 2016 under IMO Resolution MSC.370(93). Other recent amendments include:

- New ship and fire integrity arrangements, adopted in November 2016 and entered into force on 1 January 2020. These relate to window fire-rating requirements on gas carriers.
- A revised model form of certification (known as the Certificate of Fitness), adopted in May 2018 and entered into force on 1 January 2020.
- Amendments to include new requirements on watertight doors on gas carriers, due to enter into force on 1 July 2024.
