= Paradise Falls (disambiguation) =

Paradise Falls is a Canadian television soap opera.

Paradise Falls may also refer to:

- Paradise Falls, a fictional South American waterfall in Up (2009 film), modeled after Angel Falls
- Paradise Falls, a waterfall in Wildwood Regional Park, Thousand Oaks, California
- Paradise Falls, Ohio, a fictional town used as the setting for several novels by author Don Robertson, including his 1968 novel Paradise Falls
