= Liquefied natural gas =

Form of natural gas for easier storage and transport

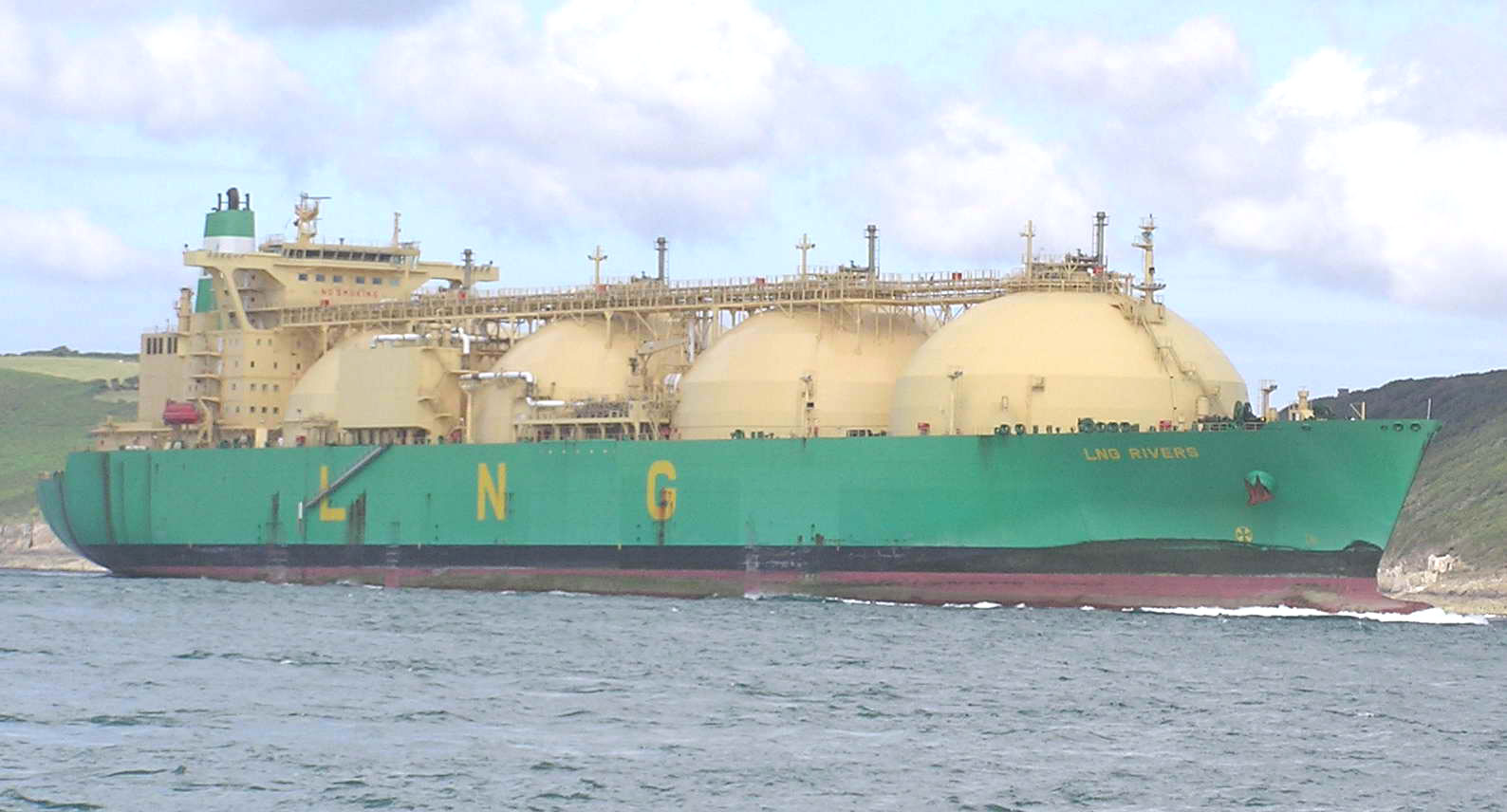
LNG carrier

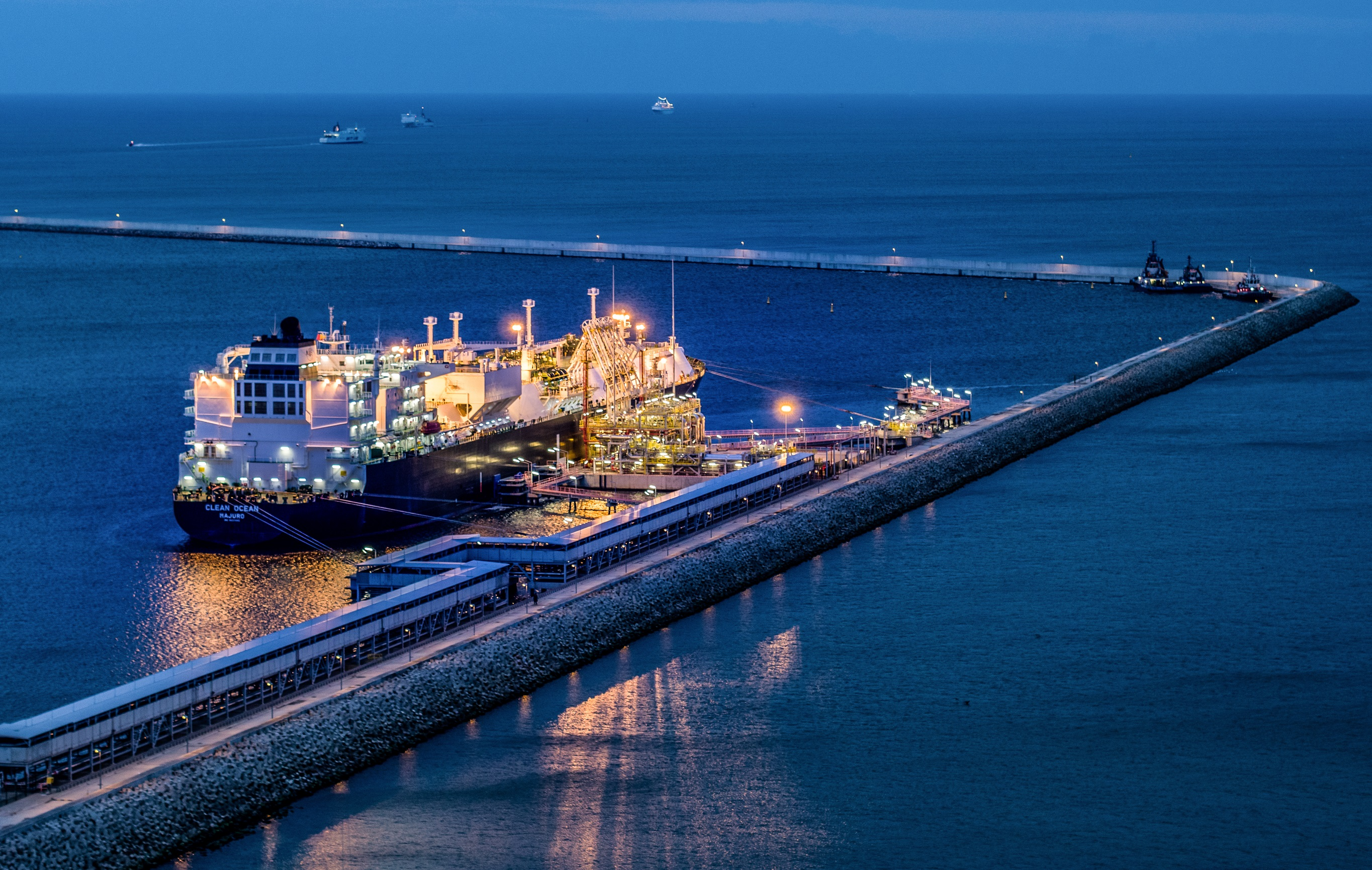
A liquefied natural gas ship at Świnoujście LNG terminal in Poland

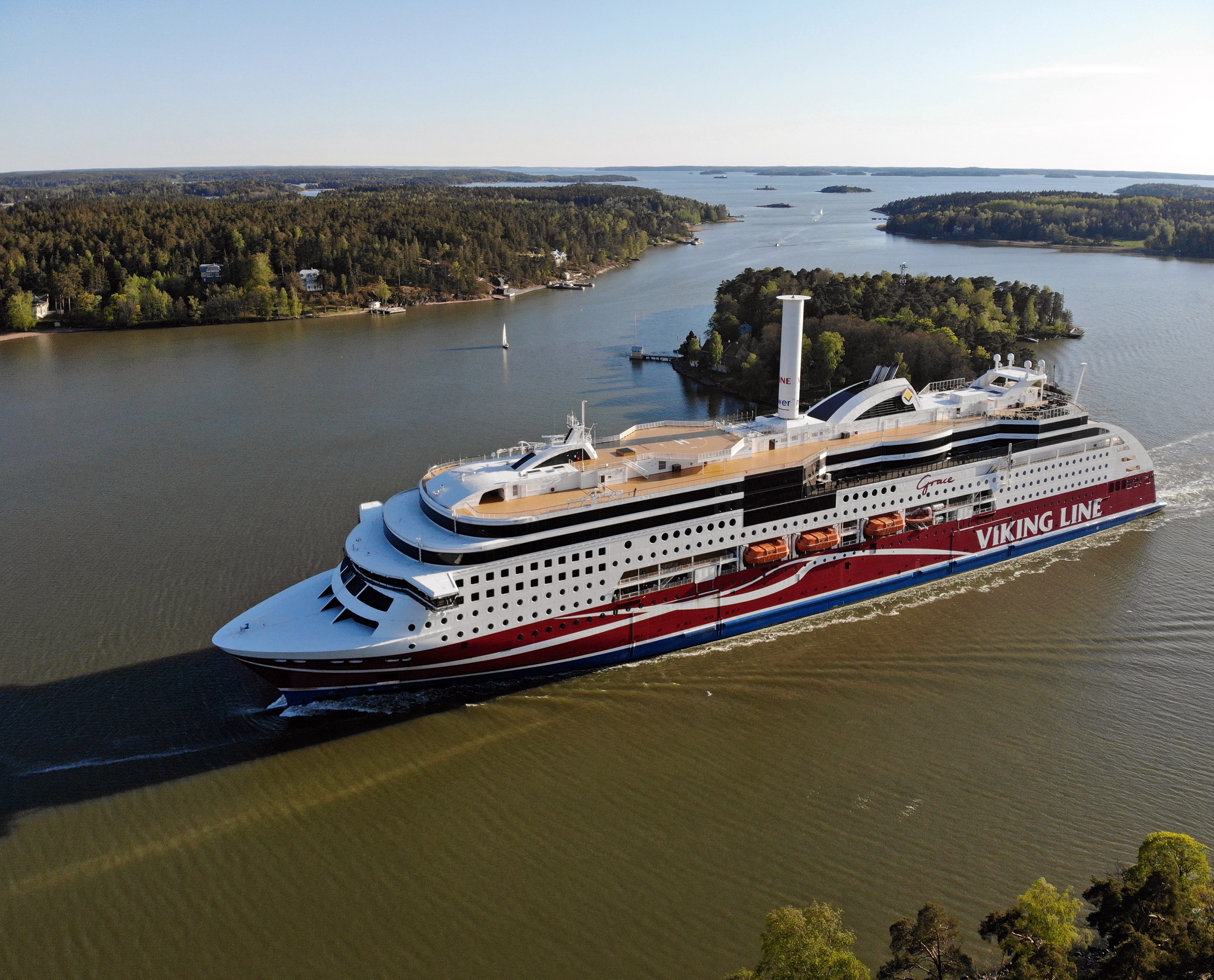
The passenger ship MS Viking Grace, the world's first large-scale passenger ship to be powered with liquefied natural gas

Liquefied natural gas (sometimes liquid natural gas, frequently LNG) is natural gas (predominantly methane, CH_{4}, with some mixture of ethane, C_{2}H_{6}) that has been cooled to liquid form for ease and safety of non-pressurized storage or transport. It takes up approximately 1/600th the volume of natural gas in the gaseous state at standard temperature and pressure.

LNG is odorless, colorless, non-toxic, and non-corrosive. Hazards include flammability after vaporization into a gaseous state, freezing and asphyxiation. The liquefaction process involves removal of certain components, such as dust, carbon dioxide, helium, water, and heavy hydrocarbons, which could cause process upsets downstream. The natural gas is then condensed into a liquid at close to atmospheric pressure by cooling it to approximately −162 °C (−260 °F); maximum transport pressure is set at around 127 kPa (18 psi), which is approximately 1.25 times atmospheric pressure at sea level. The gas stream is typically separated into the liquefied petroleum fractions (butane and propane) and the lighter ethane and methane fractions. These lighter fractions of methane and ethane make up the bulk of LNG that is liquefied and stored.

Before the late 20th century natural gas was largely considered a byproduct of oil production. The development of production processes, cryogenic storage, and transportation made it possible to commercialize natural gas, creating a global market which now competes with other fuels. The development of LNG storage made natural gas transportation much more reliable. Unlike simple tank storage used for other fuels, natural gas previously could not be stored for extended periods due to the difficulty of preventing gas leakage. Large-scale cryogenic storage made it possible to create reliable long-term storage reserves for natural gas as well. These reserves of liquefied gas could be quickly deployed through regasification processes, and today are the main means for networks to handle local peak shaving requirements.

Production of LNG is an energy intensive process concentrated in a few countries, and typically requires specialized ports for handling the export of the LNG for use in other countries. As of 2023, the United States, Australia and Qatar had the most capacity for exporting LNG, and China, Japan, and South Korea were the biggest importers. A 2025 report by the IEA found that more capacity would be coming on in the upcoming decade. This hyper-concentration of production creates choke points in global supply chains, with the 2026 Iran war affecting Qatar's LNG exports, causing a ripple effect in LNG access and cost.

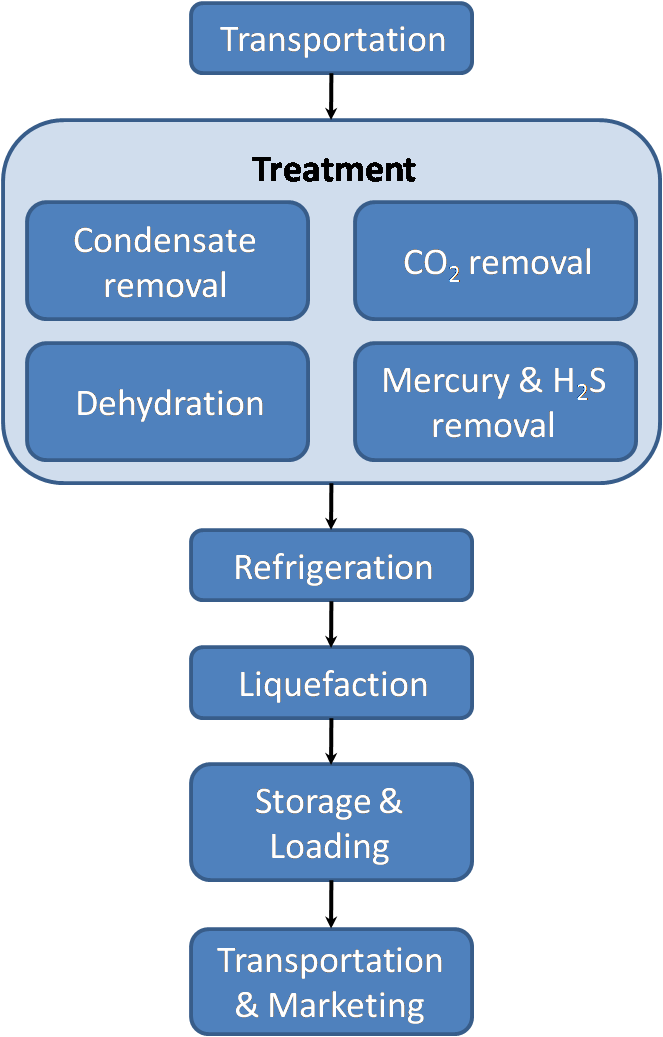
A typical LNG process

== Specific energy content and energy density ==
The heating value depends on the source of gas that is used and the process that is used to liquefy the gas. The range of heating value can span ±10 to 15 percent. A typical value of the higher heating value of LNG is approximately 50 MJ/kg or 21,500 BTU/lb. A typical value of the lower heating value of LNG is 45 MJ/kg or 19,350 BTU/lb.

For the purpose of comparison of different fuels, the heating value may be expressed in terms of energy per volume, which is known as the energy density expressed in MJ/litre. The density of LNG is roughly 0.41 kg/litre to 0.5 kg/litre, depending on temperature, pressure, and composition, compared to water at 1.0 kg/litre. Using the median value of 0.45 kg/litre, the typical energy density values are 22.5 MJ/litre (based on higher heating value) or 20.3 MJ/litre (based on lower heating value).

The volumetric energy density of LNG is approximately 2.4 times that of compressed natural gas (CNG), which makes it economical to transport natural gas by ship in the form of LNG. The energy density of LNG is comparable to propane and ethanol but is only 60 percent that of diesel and 70 percent that of gasoline.

== History ==
By the middle of the seventeenth century Robert Boyle had derived the inverse relationship between the pressure and the volume of gases. About the same time, Guillaume Amontons was investigating the effect of temperature on gases. Early in the nineteenth century Cagniard de la Tour showed there was a temperature above which a gas could not be liquefied. In 1886 Karol Olszewski liquefied methane, the primary constituent of natural gas.

The first large-scale liquefaction of natural gas in the U.S. was in 1918 when the U.S. government liquefied natural gas as a way to extract helium, which is a small component of some natural gas. This helium was intended for use in British dirigibles for World War I. The liquid natural gas (LNG) was not stored, but regasified and immediately put into the gas mains.

Because of large volumes it is not practical to store natural gas, as a gas, near atmospheric pressure. However, when liquefied, it can be stored in a volume 1/600th as large. This is a practical way to store it but the gas must be kept at −260 °F (−162 °C).

The key patents having to do with natural gas liquefaction date from 1915 and the mid-1930s. In 1915, Godfrey Cabot patented a method for storing liquid gases at very low temperatures. It consisted of a Thermos bottle-type design which included a cold inner tank within an outer tank, the tanks being separated by insulation.

In 1937 Lee Twomey received patents for a process for large-scale liquefaction of natural gas. The intention was to store natural gas as a liquid so it could be used to support peak energy loads during cold snaps. Twomey used a variant of the Linde process. In this process, the gas is cooled regeneratively by continually passing and expanding it through an orifice until it is cooled to temperatures at which it liquefies. This process was developed by James Joule and William Thomson and is known as the Joule–Thomson effect. A variation of the Linde process, called the Claude process, is sometimes used.

The cascade process emerged in the 1960s. Engineers at Phillips Petroleum Company developed the Optimized Cascade Process, which employed three successive refrigeration cycles—propane for precooling, ethylene (or ethane) for intermediate cooling, and methane for final liquefaction. This stepwise approach improved thermodynamic efficiency and operational stability. It was first applied commercially at the Kenai LNG plant in Alaska in 1969, the first baseload LNG export facility in the United States.

=== Commercial operations in the United States ===
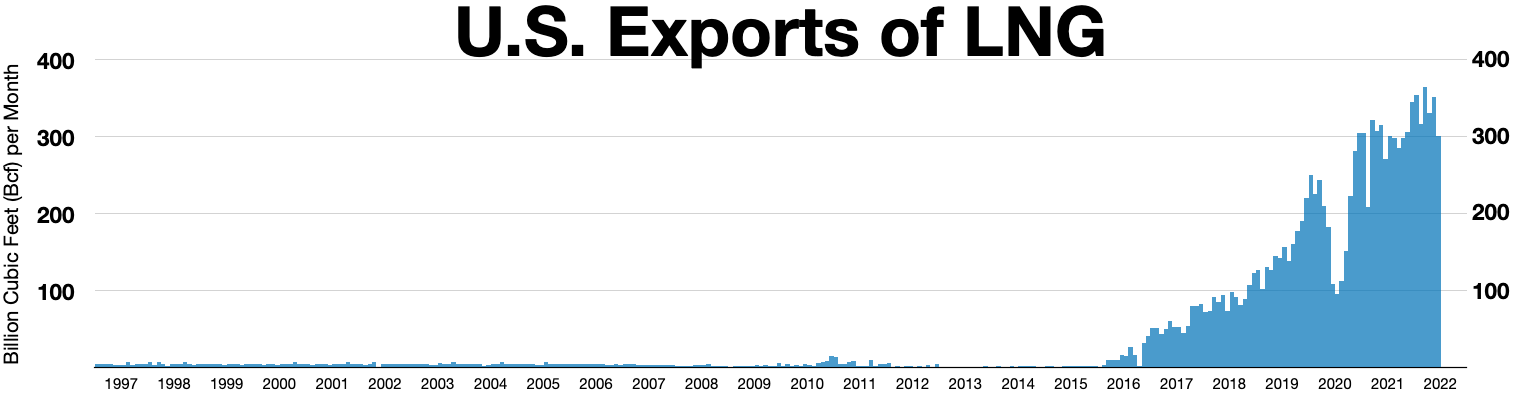
U.S. LNG exports 1997–2022

Natural gas capacity and exports LNG export capacity Calcasieu Pass Elba Island Freeport Cameron Corpus Christi Cove Point Sabine Pass

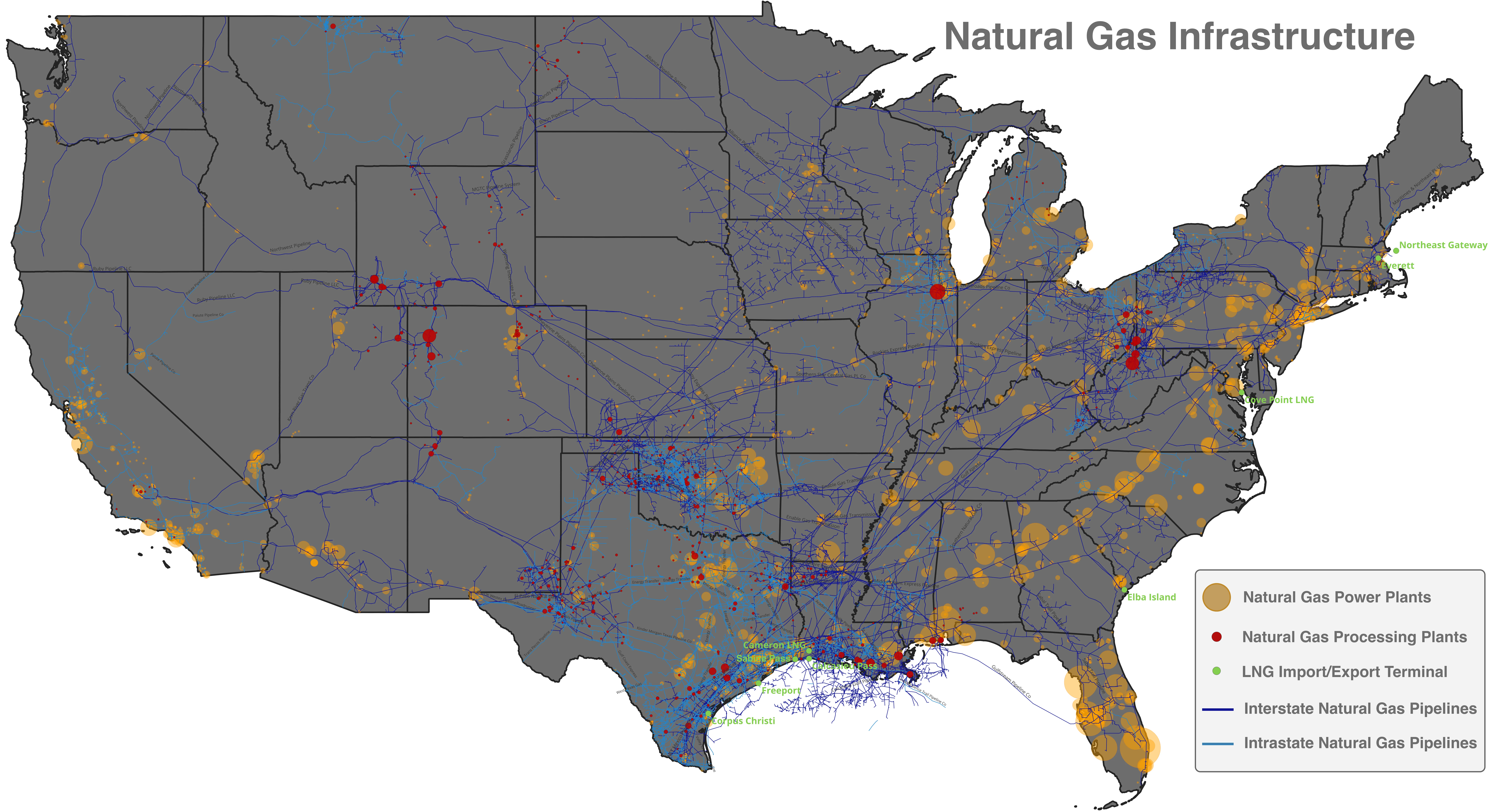
Natural gas infrastructure in the United States ● LNG terminals

The East Ohio Gas Company built a full-scale commercial LNG plant in Cleveland, Ohio, in 1940 just after a successful pilot plant built by its sister company, Hope Natural Gas Company of West Virginia. This was the first such plant in the world. Originally it had three spheres, approximately 63 feet (19 m) in diameter containing LNG at −260 °F (−162 °C). Each sphere held the equivalent of about 50 million cubic foot (1,400,000 m^{3}) of natural gas. A fourth tank, a cylinder, was added in 1942. It had an equivalent capacity of 100 million cubic foot (2,800,000 m^{3}) of gas. The plant operated successfully for three years. The stored gas was regasified and put into the mains when cold snaps hit and extra capacity was needed. This precluded the denial of gas to some customers during a cold snap.

The Cleveland plant failed on October 20, 1944, when the cylindrical tank ruptured, spilling thousands of gallons of LNG over the plant and nearby neighborhood. The gas evaporated and caught fire, which caused 130 fatalities. The fire delayed further implementation of LNG facilities for several years. However, over the next 15 years new research on low-temperature alloys, and better insulation materials, set the stage for a revival of the industry. It restarted in 1959 when a U.S. World War II Liberty ship, the Methane Pioneer, converted to carry LNG, made a delivery of LNG from the U.S. Gulf Coast to energy-starved Great Britain. In June 1964, the world's first purpose-built LNG carrier, the Methane Princess, entered service. Soon after that a large natural gas field was discovered in Algeria. International trade in LNG quickly followed as LNG was shipped to France and Great Britain from the Algerian fields.

The LNG industry in the U.S. restarted in 1965 with the building of a number of new plants, which continued through the 1970s. These plants were not only used for peak-shaving, as in Cleveland, but also for base-load supplies for places that never had natural gas before this. A number of import facilities were built on the East Coast in anticipation of the need to import energy via LNG. However, As of 2010 hydraulic fracturing ("fracking") created a boom in U.S. natural gas production, resulting in import facilities being repurposed as export facilities. The first U.S. LNG export was completed in early 2016.

By 2023, the U.S. had become the biggest exporter in the world, and projects already under construction or permitted would double its export capacities by 2027. The largest exporters were Cheniere Energy Inc., Freeport LNG, and Venture Global LNG Inc. The U.S. Energy Information Administration reported that the U.S. had exported 4.3 trillion cubic foot (1.2×10^{11} m^{3}) in 2023.

== LNG life cycle ==
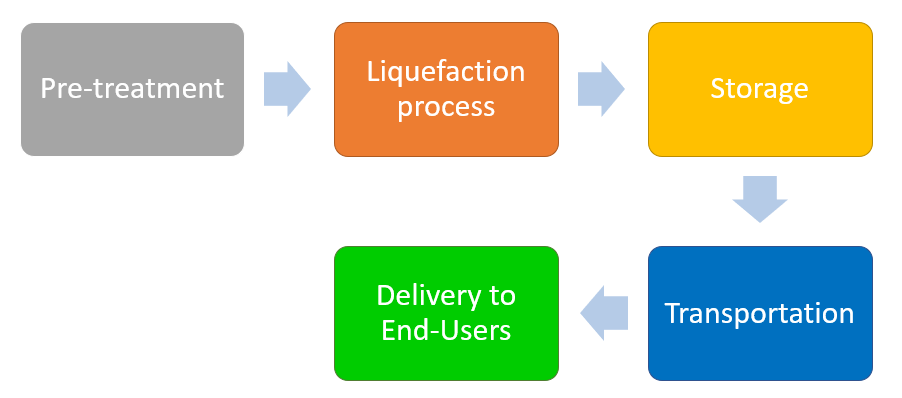
LNG life cycle

The process begins with the pre-treatment of a feedstock of natural gas entering the system to remove impurities such as H_{2}S, CO_{2}, H_{2}O, mercury and higher-chained hydrocarbons. Feedstock gas then enters the liquefaction unit where it is cooled to between −145 °C and −163 °C. Although the type or number of heating cycles and/or refrigerants used may vary based on the technology, the basic process involves circulating the gas through aluminum tube coils and exposure to a compressed refrigerant. As the refrigerant is vaporized, the heat transfer causes the gas in the coils to cool. The LNG is then stored in a specialized double-walled insulated tank at atmospheric pressure ready to be transported to its final destination.

Most domestic LNG is transported by land via truck/trailer designed for cryogenic temperatures. Intercontinental LNG transport travels by special tanker ships. LNG transport tanks comprise an internal steel or aluminum compartment and an external carbon or steel compartment with a vacuum system in between to reduce the amount of heat transfer. Once on site, the LNG must be stored in vacuum insulated or flat bottom storage tanks. When ready for distribution, the LNG enters a regasification facility where it is pumped into a vaporizer and heated back into gaseous form. The gas then enters the gas pipeline distribution system and is delivered to the end-user.

The final stage of the LNG life cycle is combustion by the end user, potentially for electricity generation or other industrial processes. Combustion turns it into carbon dioxide and water which enter the atmosphere. Some methane is lost during this cycle; these leaks into the atmosphere are trapped and constitute a greenhouse gas. Methane gas is generally less harmful for human health than coal, but it is a greater contributor to climate change due to leaks and flaring.

== Production ==
The natural gas fed into the LNG plant will be treated to remove water, hydrogen sulfide, carbon dioxide, benzene and other components that will freeze under the low temperatures needed for storage or be destructive to the liquefaction facility. LNG typically contains more than 90% methane. It also contains small amounts of ethane, propane, butane, some heavier alkanes, and nitrogen. The purification process can be designed to give almost 100% methane. One of the risks of LNG is a rapid phase transition explosion (RPT), which occurs when cold LNG comes into contact with water.

The most important infrastructure needed for LNG production and transportation is an LNG plant consisting of one or more LNG trains, each of which is an independent unit for gas liquefaction and purification. A typical train consists of a compression area, propane condenser area, and methane and ethane areas.

The largest LNG train in operation is in Qatar, with a total production capacity of 7.8 million tonnes per annum (MTPA). LNG is loaded onto ships and delivered to a regasification terminal, where the LNG is allowed to expand and reconvert into gas. Regasification terminals are usually connected to a storage and pipeline distribution network to distribute natural gas to local distribution companies (LDCs) or independent power plants (IPPs).

=== LNG plant production ===
Information for the following table is derived in part from publication by the U.S. Energy Information Administration.
See also List of LNG terminals

| Plant Name | Location | Country | Startup Date | Capacity (MTPA) | Corporation |
|---|---|---|---|---|---|
| Gorgon LNG | Barrow Island | Australia | 2016 | 15 (3 × 5) | Chevron 47% |
| GLNG | Curtis Island | Australia | 2015 | 7.8 | Santos GLNG |
| Ichthys | Browse Basin | Australia | 2016 | 8.4 (2 × 4.2) | INPEX, TotalEnergies 24% |
| DLNG: Darwin LNG | Darwin, NT | Australia | 2006 | 3.7 | Santos Limited |
| QLNG: Queensland Curtis LNG | Curtis Island | Australia | 2015 | 8.5 (2 trains) | BG Group |
| APLNG: Australia Pacific LNG | Location | Australia | 2016 | 9.0 (2 trains) | Origin Energy |
| North West Shelf Venture, Karratha Gas Plant | Karratha | Australia | 1989 | 16.3 (5 trains) | Woodside Energy |
| Pluto LNG | Karratha | Australia | 2012 | 4.3 (1 train) | Woodside Energy |
| Wheatstone LNG | Barrow Island | Australia | 2017/2018 | 8.9 (2 trains) | Chevron Corporation |
| Prelude FLNG | Timor Sea | Australia | 2019 | 3.6 (1 train) | Shell |
| Das Island I Trains 1–2 | Abu Dhabi | UAE | 1977 | 3.4 (1.7 × 2) | ADGAS (ADNOC, BP, TotalEnergies, Mitsui) |
| Das Island II Train 3 | Abu Dhabi | UAE | 1994 | 2.6 | ADGAS (ADNOC, BP, TotalEnergies, Mitsui) |
| Arzew (CAMEL) GL4Z Trains 1–3 | Oran | Algeria | 1964 | 0.9 (0.3 × 3) | Sonatrach. Shutdown since April 2010. |
| Arzew GL1Z Trains 1–6 | Oran | Algeria | 1978 | 7.8 (1.3 × 6) | Sonatrach |
| Arzew GL2Z Trains 1–6 | Oran | Algeria | 1981 | 8.4 (1.4 × 6) | Sonatrach |
| Skikda GL1K Phase 1 & 2 Trains 1–6 | Skikda | Algeria | 1972/1981 | 6.0 (total) | Sonatrach |
| Skikda GL3Z Skikda Train 1 | Skikda | Algeria | 2013 | 4.7 | Sonatrach |
| Skikda GL3Z Skikda Train 2 | Skikda | Algeria | 2013 | 4.5 | Sonatrach |
| Angola LNG | Soyo | Angola | 2013 | 5.2 | Chevron |
| Lumut 1 | Lumut | Brunei | 1972 | 7.2 | |
| Badak NGL A-B | Bontang | Indonesia | 1977 | 4 | Pertamina |
| Badak NGL C-D | Bontang | Indonesia | 1986 | 4.5 | Pertamina |
| Badak NGL E | Bontang | Indonesia | 1989 | 3.5 | Pertamina |
| Badak NGL F | Bontang | Indonesia | 1993 | 3.5 | Pertamina |
| Badak NGL G | Bontang | Indonesia | 1998 | 3.5 | Pertamina |
| Badak NGL H | Bontang | Indonesia | 1999 | 3.7 | Pertamina |
| Donggi Senoro LNG | Luwuk | Indonesia | 2015 | 2 | Mitsubishi, Pertamina, Medco |
| Atlantic LNG | Point Fortin | Trinidad and Tobago | 1999 | | Atlantic LNG |
| Atlantic LNG | Point Fortin | Trinidad and Tobago | 2003 | 9.9 | Atlantic LNG |
| SEGAS LNG | Damietta | Egypt | 2004 | 5.5 | SEGAS LNG |
| Egyptian LNG | Idku | Egypt | 2005 | 7.2 | |
| Bintulu MLNG 1 | Bintulu | Malaysia | 1983 | 7.6 | PETRONAS |
| Bintulu MLNG 2 | Bintulu | Malaysia | 1994 | 7.8 | PETRONAS |
| Bintulu MLNG 3 | Bintulu | Malaysia | 2003 | 3.4 | PETRONAS |
| Nigeria LNG | Bonny Island | Nigeria | 1999 | 23.5 | NNPC (49%), Shell (25.6%), TotalEnergies (15%), Eni (10.4%) |
| Sakhalin II | Sakhalin | Russia | 2009 | 9.6. | |
| Yemen LNG | Balhaf | Yemen | 2008 | 6.7 | |
| Tangguh LNG Project | Papua Barat | Indonesia | 2009 | 7.6 | |
| Qatargas Train 1 | Ras Laffan | Qatar | 1996 | 3.3 | |
| Qatargas Train 2 | Ras Laffan | Qatar | 1997 | 3.3 | |
| Qatargas Train 3 | Ras Laffan | Qatar | 1998 | 3.3 | |
| Qatargas Train 4 | Ras Laffan | Qatar | 2009 | 7.8 | |
| Qatargas Train 5 | Ras Laffan | Qatar | 2009 | 7.8 | |
| Qatargas Train 6 | Ras Laffan | Qatar | 2010 | 7.8 | |
| Qatargas Train 7 | Ras Laffan | Qatar | 2011 | 7.8 | |
| Rasgas Train 1 | Ras Laffan | Qatar | 1999 | 3.3 | |
| Rasgas Train 2 | Ras Laffan | Qatar | 2000 | 3.3 | |
| Rasgas Train 3 | Ras Laffan | Qatar | 2004 | 4.7 | |
| Rasgas Train 4 | Ras Laffan | Qatar | 2005 | 4.7 | |
| Rasgas Train 5 | Ras Laffan | Qatar | 2006 | 4.7 | |
| Rasgas Train 6 | Ras Laffan | Qatar | 2009 | 7.8 | |
| Rasgas Train 7 | Ras Laffan | Qatar | 2010 | 7.8 | |
| Qalhat LNG Terminal | Qalhat | Oman | 2000 | 7.3 | |
| Melkøya | Hammerfest | Norway | 2007 | 4.2 | Statoil |
| EG LNG | Malabo | Equatorial Guinea | 2007 | 3.4 | Marathon Oil |
| Risavika | Stavanger | Norway | 2010 | 0.3 | Risavika LNG Production |
| Cove Point LNG | Lusby, Maryland | United States | 2018 | 5.2 | Dominion Resources |
| Peru LNG | Melchorita Port | Peru | 2010 | 4.4 | Hunt Oil Company |
| Calcasieu Pass | Calcasieu Parish | United States | 2022 | 12.4 | Venture Global, Inc. |
| Plaquemines LNG | Plaquemines Parish | United States | 2024 | 27.2 | Venture Global, Inc. |
| Sabine Pass LNG | Sabine Pass | United States | 2016 | 30.0 | Cheniere Energy |
| Corpus Christi LNG | Corpus Christi | United States | 2018 | 18.0 | Cheniere Energy |
| Golden Pass LNG | Sabine Pass | United States | 2026 | 18.0 | QatarEnergy (70%), ExxonMobil (30%) |

=== World total production ===
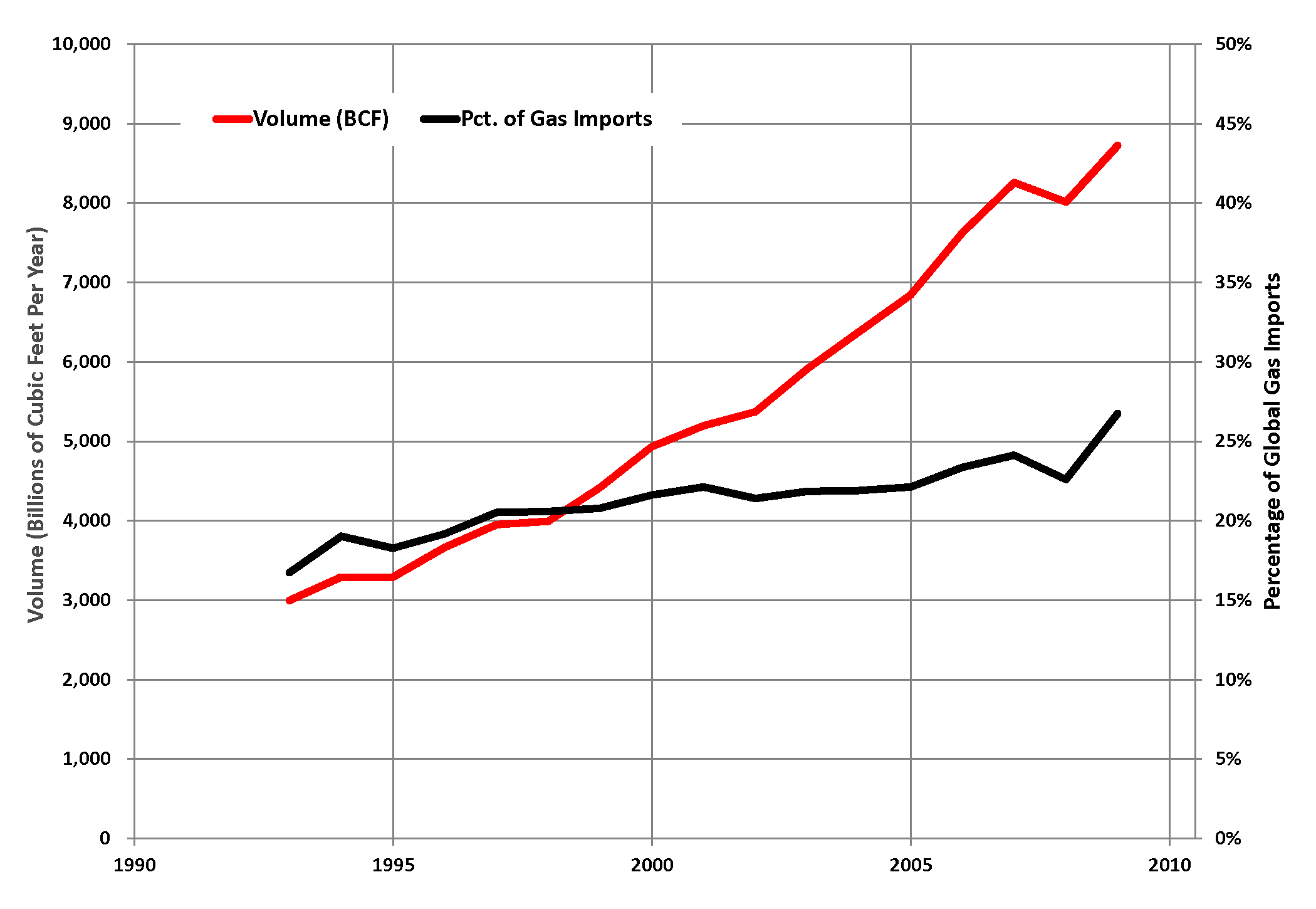
Global LNG import trends, by volume (in red), and as a percentage of global natural gas imports (in black) (US EIA data)

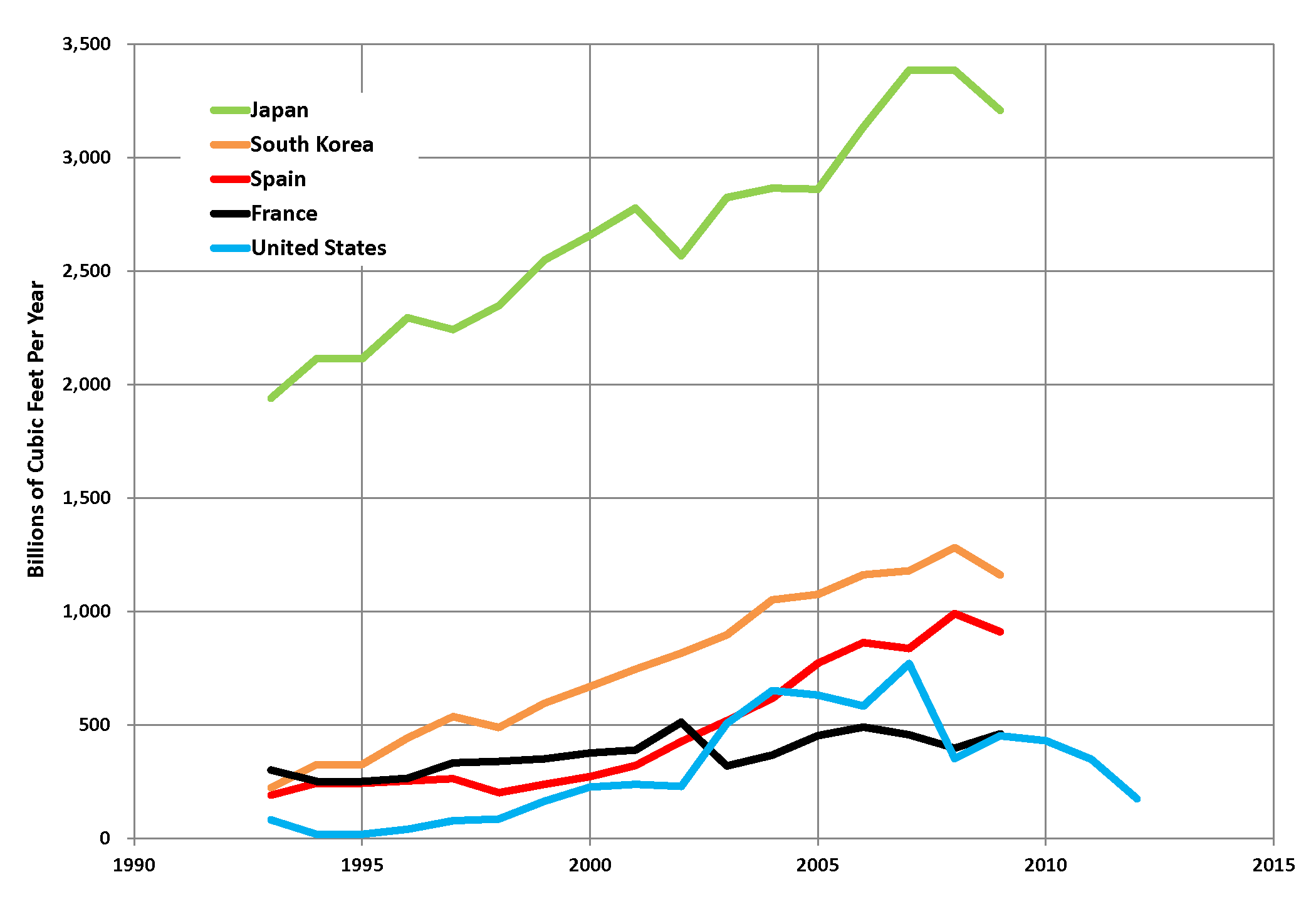
Trends in the top five LNG-importing nations as of 2009 (US EIA data)

| Year | Capacity (MTPA) |
|---|---|
| 1990 | 50 |
| 2002 | 130 |
| 2007 | 160 |
| 2014 | 246 |

The LNG industry developed slowly during the second half of the last century because most LNG plants are located in remote areas not served by pipelines, and because of the high costs of treating and transporting LNG. Constructing an LNG plant costs at least $1.5 billion per 1 MTPA capacity, a receiving terminal costs $1 billion per 1 bcf/day throughput capacity and LNG vessels cost $200 million–$300 million.

In the early 2000s, prices for constructing LNG plants, receiving terminals and vessels fell as new technologies emerged and more players invested in liquefaction and regasification. This tended to make LNG more competitive as a means of energy distribution, but increasing material costs and demand for construction contractors have put upward pressure on prices in the last few years. The standard price for a 125,000 cubic meter LNG vessel built in European and Japanese shipyards used to be US$250 million. When Korean and Chinese shipyards entered the race, increased competition reduced profit margins and improved efficiency—reducing costs by 60 percent. Costs in US dollars also declined due to the devaluation of the currencies of the world's largest shipbuilders: the Japanese yen and Korean won.

Since 2004, the large number of orders increased demand for shipyard slots, raising their price and increasing ship costs. The per-ton construction cost of an LNG liquefaction plant fell steadily from the 1970s through the 1990s. The cost reduced by approximately 35 percent. However, recently the cost of building liquefaction and regasification terminals doubled due to increased cost of materials and a shortage of skilled labor, professional engineers, designers, managers and other white-collar professionals.

Prior to the natural gas boom in the U.S., many new LNG import terminals were considered in the United States. Concerns about the safety of such facilities create controversy in some regions where they are proposed. One such location is in the Long Island Sound between Connecticut and Long Island. Broadwater Energy, an effort of TransCanada Corp. and Shell, wishes to build an LNG import terminal in the sound on the New York side. Local politicians including the Suffolk County Executive raised questions about the terminal. In 2005, New York Senators Chuck Schumer and Hillary Clinton also announced their opposition to the project. Several import terminal proposals along the coast of Maine were also met with high levels of resistance and questions. On September 13, 2013, the U.S. Department of Energy approved Dominion Cove Point's application to export up to 770 million cubic foot (22,000,000 m^{3}) per day of LNG to countries that do not have a free trade agreement with the U.S. In May 2014, the FERC concluded its environmental assessment of the Cove Point LNG project, which found that the proposed natural gas export project could be built and operated safely. Another LNG terminal is currently proposed for Elba Island, Georgia, US. Plans for three LNG export terminals in the U.S. Gulf Coast region have also received conditional Federal approval. In Canada, an LNG export terminal is under construction near Guysborough, Nova Scotia.

== Commercial aspects ==
=== Global Trade ===
In the commercial development of an LNG value chain, LNG suppliers first confirm sales to the downstream buyers and then sign long-term contracts (typically 20–25 years) with strict terms and structures for gas pricing. Only when the customers are confirmed and the development of a greenfield project deemed economically feasible, could the sponsors of an LNG project invest in their development and operation. Thus, the LNG liquefaction business has been limited to players with strong financial and political resources. Major international oil companies (IOCs) such as ExxonMobil, Royal Dutch Shell, BP, Chevron, TotalEnergies and national oil companies (NOCs) such as Aramco and Petronas are active players.

LNG is shipped around the world in specially constructed seagoing vessels. The trade of LNG is completed by signing an SPA (sale and purchase agreement) between a supplier and receiving terminal, and by signing a GSA (gas sale agreement) between a receiving terminal and end-users. Most of the contract terms used to be DES or ex ship, holding the seller responsible for the transport of the gas.

LNG purchasing agreements used to be for a long term with relatively little flexibility both in price and volume. If the annual contract quantity is confirmed, the buyer is obliged to take and pay for the product, or pay for it even if not taken, in what is referred to as the obligation of take-or-pay contract (TOP).

In the mid-1990s, LNG was a buyer's market. At the request of buyers, the SPAs began to adopt some flexibilities on volume and price. The buyers had more upward and downward flexibilities in TOP, and short-term SPAs less than 16 years came into effect. At the same time, alternative destinations for cargo and arbitrage were also allowed. By the turn of the 21st century, the market was again in favor of sellers. However, sellers have become more sophisticated and are now proposing sharing of arbitrage opportunities and moving away from S-curve pricing.

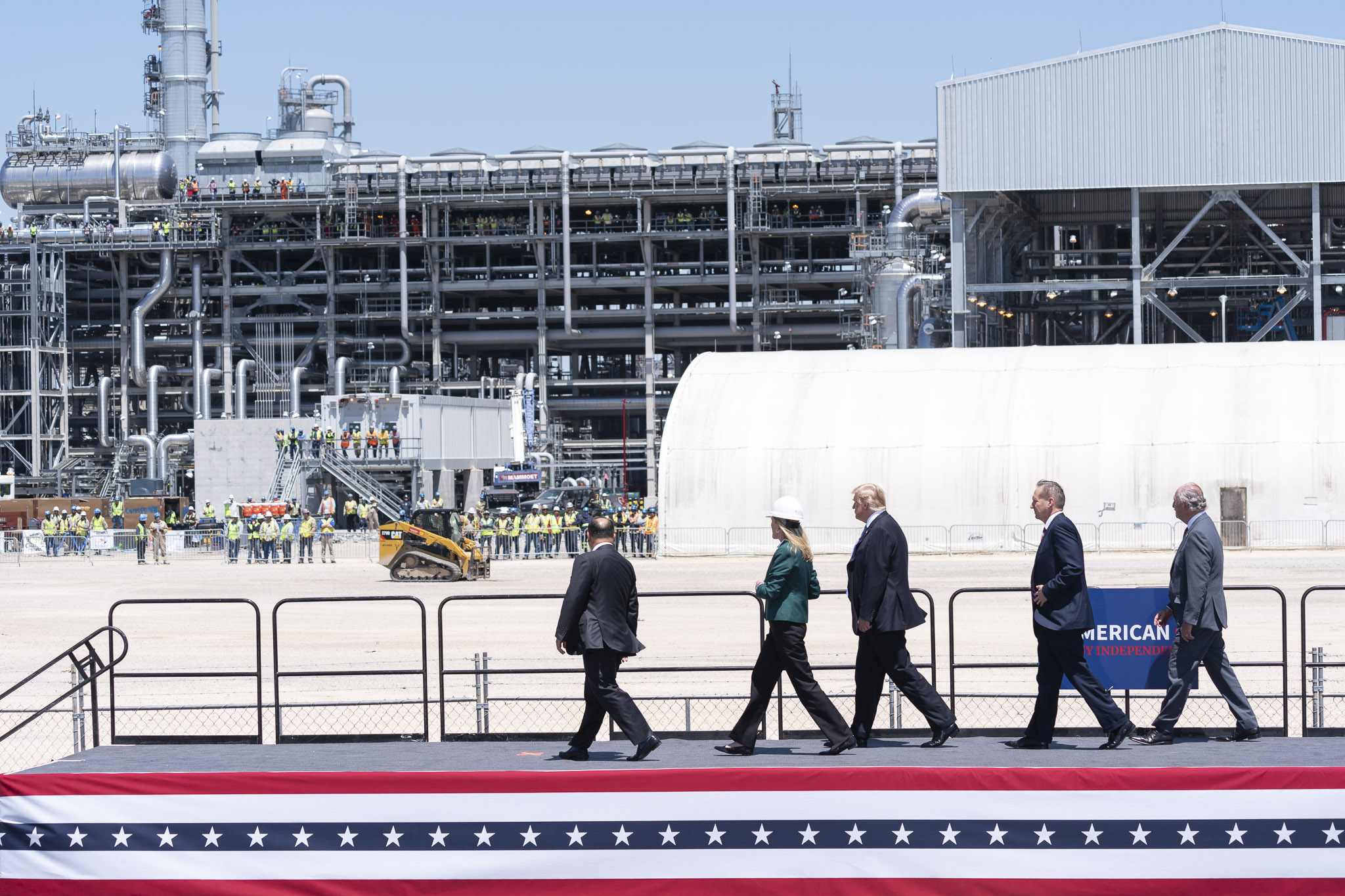
President Trump visits the Cameron LNG Export Terminal in Louisiana, May 2019.

Research from Global Energy Monitor in 2019 warned that up to US$1.3 trillion in new LNG export and import infrastructure currently under development is at significant risk of becoming stranded, as global gas risks becoming oversupplied, particularly if the United States and Canada play a larger role. Also, demand for LNG will decline as economies decarbonise.

The current surge in unconventional oil and gas in the U.S. has resulted in lower gas prices in the U.S. This has led to discussions in Asia' oil linked gas markets to import gas based on Henry Hub index.

Receiving terminals exist in about 40 countries, including Belgium, Chile, China, the Dominican Republic, France, Greece, India, Italy, Japan, Korea, Poland, Spain, Taiwan, the UK, the US, among others. Plans exist for Bahrain, Germany, Ghana, Morocco, Philippines, Vietnam and others to also construct new receiving (regasification) terminals.

=== LNG Project Screening ===
Base load (large-scale, >1 MTPA) LNG projects require natural gas reserves, buyers and financing. Using proven technology and a proven contractor is extremely important for both investors and buyers. Gas reserves required: 1 tcf of gas required per Mtpa of LNG over 20 years.

LNG is most cost efficiently produced in relatively large facilities due to economies of scale, at sites with marine access allowing regular large bulk shipments direct to market. This requires a secure gas supply of sufficient capacity. Ideally, facilities are located close to the gas source, to minimize the cost of intermediate transport infrastructure and gas shrinkage (fuel loss in transport). The high cost of building large LNG facilities makes the progressive development of gas sources to maximize facility utilization essential, and the life extension of existing, financially depreciated LNG facilities cost effective. Particularly when combined with lower sale prices due to large installed capacity and rising construction costs, this makes the economic screening/ justification to develop new, and especially greenfield, LNG facilities challenging, even if these could be more environmentally friendly than existing facilities with all stakeholder concerns satisfied. Due to high financial risk, it is usual to contractually secure gas supply/ concessions and gas sales for extended periods before proceeding to an investment decision.

== Uses ==
The primary use of LNG is to simplify transport of natural gas from the source to a destination. On the large scale, this is done when the source and the destination are across an ocean from each other. It can also be used when adequate pipeline capacity is not available. For large-scale transport uses, the LNG is typically regassified at the receiving end and pushed into the local natural gas pipeline infrastructure.

LNG can also be used to meet peak demand when the normal pipeline infrastructure can meet most demand needs, but not the peak demand needs. These plants are typically called LNG Peak Shaving Plants as the purpose is to shave off part of the peak demand from what is required out of the supply pipeline.

LNG can be used to fuel internal combustion engines. LNG is in the early stages of becoming a mainstream fuel for transportation needs. It is being evaluated and tested for over-the-road trucking, off-road, marine, and rail applications. There are known problems with the fuel tanks and delivery of gas to the engine, but despite these concerns the move to LNG as a transportation fuel has begun. LNG competes directly with compressed natural gas as a fuel for natural gas vehicles since the engine is identical. There may be applications where LNG trucks, buses, trains and boats could be cost-effective in order to regularly distribute LNG energy together with general freight and/or passengers to smaller, isolated communities without a local gas source or access to pipelines.

=== Use of LNG to fuel large over-the-road trucks ===
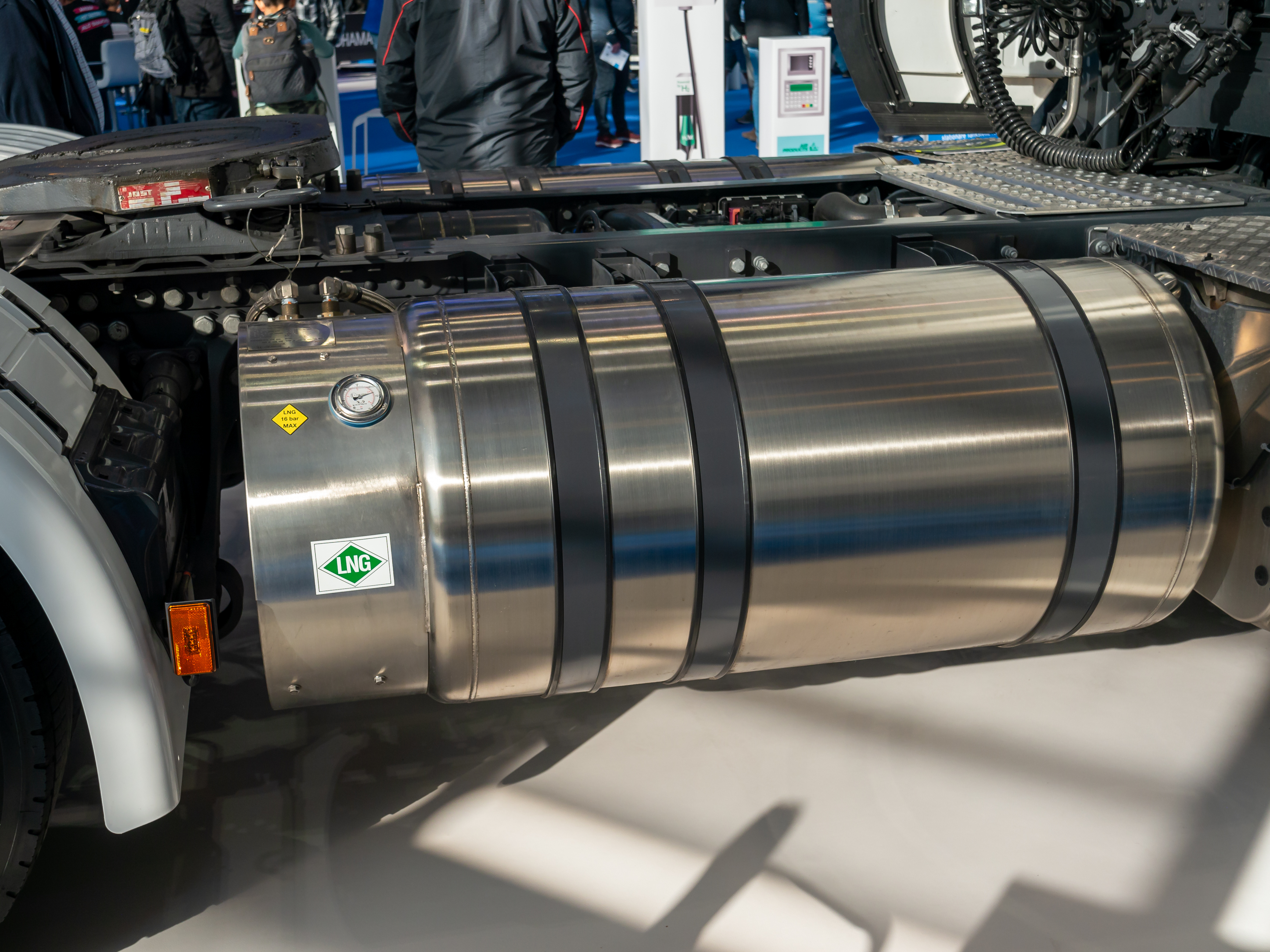
LNG side tank on an LNG-powered Scania R410

China has been a leader in the use of LNG vehicles with over 100,000 LNG-powered vehicles on the road as of Sept 2014.

In the United States the beginnings of a public LNG fueling capability are being put in place. An alternative fuelling centre tracking site shows 84 public truck LNG fuel centres as of Dec 2016. It is possible for large trucks to make cross country trips such as Los Angeles to Boston and refuel at public refuelling stations every 500 miles (800 km). The 2013 National Trucker's Directory lists approximately 7,000 truckstops, thus approximately 1% of US truckstops have LNG available.

While as of December 2014 LNG fuel and NGV's were not taken to very quickly within Europe and it was questionable whether LNG will ever become the fuel of choice among fleet operators, recent trends from 2018 onwards show different prospect. During the year 2015, the Netherlands introduced LNG-powered trucks in transport sector. Additionally, the Australian government is planning to develop an LNG highway to utilise the locally produced LNG and replace the imported diesel fuel used by interstate haulage vehicles.

In the year 2015, India also began transporting LNG using LNG-powered road tankers in Kerala state. In 2017, Petronet LNG began setting up 20 LNG stations on highways along the Indian west coast that connect Delhi with Thiruvananthapuram covering a total distance of 4,500 km via Mumbai and Bengaluru. In 2020, India planned to install 24 LNG fuelling stations along the 6,000 km Golden Quadrilateral highways connecting the four metros due to LNG prices decreasing.

Japan, the world's largest importer of LNG, is set to begin use of LNG as a road transport fuel.

=== High-power, high-torque engines ===
Engine displacement is an important factor in the power of an internal combustion engine. Thus a 2.0 L engine would typically be more powerful than a 1.8 L engine, but that assumes a similar air–fuel mixture is used.

However, if a smaller engine uses an air–fuel mixture with higher energy density (such as via a turbocharger), then it can produce more power than a larger one burning a less energy-dense air–fuel mixture. For high-power, high-torque engines, a fuel that creates a more energy-dense air–fuel mixture is preferred, because a smaller and simpler engine can produce the same power.

With conventional gasoline and diesel engines the energy density of the air–fuel mixture is limited because the liquid fuels do not mix well in the cylinder. Further, gasoline and diesel fuel have autoignition temperatures and pressures relevant to engine design. An important part of engine design is the interactions of cylinders, compression ratios, and fuel injectors such that pre-ignition is prevented but at the same time as much fuel as possible can be injected, become well mixed, and still have time to complete the combustion process during the power stroke.

Natural gas does not auto-ignite at pressures and temperatures relevant to conventional gasoline and diesel engine design, so it allows more flexibility in design. Methane, the main component of natural gas, has an autoignition temperature of 580 °C (1,076 °F), whereas gasoline and diesel autoignite at approximately 250 °C (482 °F) and 210 °C (410 °F) respectively.

With a compressed natural gas (CNG) engine, the mixing of the fuel and the air is more effective since gases typically mix well in a short period of time, but at typical CNG pressures the fuel itself is less energy-dense than gasoline or diesel, so the result is a less energy-dense air–fuel mixture. For an engine of a given cylinder displacement, a normally aspirated CNG-powered engine is typically less powerful than a gasoline or diesel engine of similar displacement. For that reason turbochargers are popular in European CNG cars. Despite that limitation, the 12-litre Cummins Westport ISX12G engine is an example of a CNG-capable engine designed to pull tractor–trailer loads up to 80,000 pounds (36,000 kg) showing CNG can be used in many on-road truck applications. The original ISX G engine incorporated a turbocharger to enhance the air–fuel energy density.

LNG offers a unique advantage over CNG for more demanding high-power applications by eliminating the need for a turbocharger. Because LNG boils at approximately −160 °C (−256 °F), by using a simple heat exchanger a small amount of LNG can be converted to its gaseous form at extremely high pressure with the use of little or no mechanical energy. A properly designed high-power engine can leverage this extremely-high-pressure, energy-dense gaseous fuel source to create a higher-energy-density air–fuel mixture than can be efficiently created with a CNG-powered engine. The result when compared to CNG engines is more overall efficiency in high-power engine applications when high-pressure direct-injection technology is used. The Westport HDMI2 fuel system is an example of a high-pressure direct-injection system that does not require a turbocharger if paired with an appropriate LNG heat exchanger. The Volvo Trucks 13-litre LNG engine is another example of an LNG engine leveraging advanced high-pressure technology.

Westport recommends CNG for engines 7 litres or smaller and LNG with direct-injection for engines between 20 and 150 litres. For engines between 7 and 20 litres either option is recommended. See slide 13 from their NGV Bruxelles – Industry Innovation Session presentation.

High-power engines in the oil drilling, mining, locomotive, and marine fields have been or are being developed. Paul Blomerus has written a paper concluding as much as 40 million tonnes per annum of LNG (approximately 26.1 billion gallons/year or 71 million gallons/day) could be required just to meet the global needs of such high-power engines by 2025 to 2030.

As of the end of first quarter of 2015, Prometheus Energy Group Inc claimed to have delivered over 100 million gallons of LNG to the industrial market within the previous four years and is continuing to add new customers.

=== Use of LNG in maritime applications ===
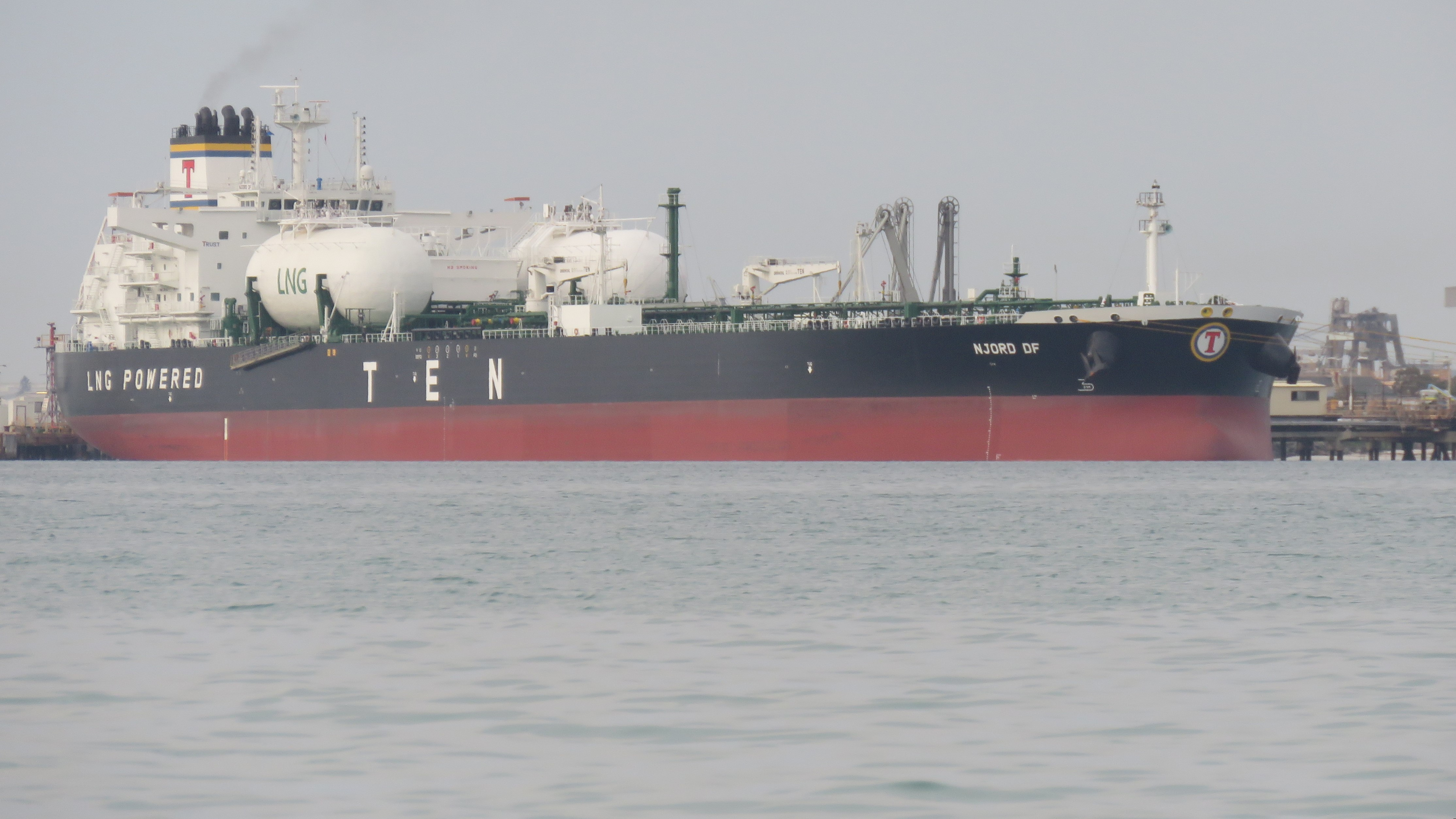
The LNG-powered Crude Oil Tanker Njord DF, moored at the BP Oil Refinery, Jetty, Western Australia

LNG bunkering has been established in some ports via truck-to-ship fueling. This type of LNG fueling is straightforward to implement, assuming a supply of LNG is available.

TOTE Maritime delivered the world's first and second LNG‑powered container ships—the Isla Bella in 2015 and her Marlin‑class sister ship, the Perla del Caribe, in 2016. TOTE Maritime also delivered North America's first LNG bunker barge, the Clean Jacksonville in 2018.

Feeder and short-sea shipping company Unifeeder has been operating LNG powered container vessel, the Wes Amelie, since late 2017, transiting between the port of Rotterdam and the Baltics on a weekly schedule. Container shipping company Maersk Group has decided to introduce LNG-powered container ships. The DEME Group has contracted Wärtsilä to power its new generation 'Antigoon' class dredger with dual fuel (DF) engines. Crowley Maritime of Jacksonville, Florida, launched two LNG-powered ConRo ships, the Coquí and Taino, in 2018 and 2019, respectively.

The International Convention for the Prevention of Pollution from Ships (MARPOL), adopted by the IMO, has mandated that marine vessels shall not consume fuel (bunker fuel, diesel, etc.) with a sulphur content greater than 0.5% from the year 2020 within international waters and the coastal areas of countries adopting the same regulation. Replacement of high sulphur bunker fuel with sulphur-free LNG is required on a major scale in the marine transport sector, as low sulphur liquid fuels are costlier than LNG. Japan's is planning to use LNG as bunker fuel by 2020.

BHP, one of the largest mining companies in the world, is aiming to commission minerals transport ships powered with LNG by late 2021.

In January 2021, 175 sea-going LNG-powered ships were in service, with another 200 ships ordered.

=== Use of LNG on rail ===
Florida East Coast Railway has 24 GE ES44C4 locomotives adapted to run on LNG fuel.

== Trade ==
The global trade in LNG is growing rapidly from negligible in 1970 to what is expected to be a globally substantial amount by 2020. As a reference, the 2014 global production of crude oil was 14.6 million cubic metres (92 million barrels) per day or 54,600 terawatt-hours (186.4 quadrillion British thermal units) per year.

In 1970, global LNG trade was of 3 billion cubic metres (bcm) (0.11 quads). In 2011, it was 331 bcm (11.92 quads). The U.S. started exporting LNG in February 2016. The Black & Veatch Oct 2014 forecast is that by 2020, the U.S. alone will export between 10 and 14 billion cu ft/d (280 and 400 million m^{3}/d) or by heating value 3.75 to 5.25 quad (1,100 to 1,540 TWh). E&Y projects global LNG demand could hit 400 mtpa (19.7 quads) by 2020. If that occurs, the LNG market will be roughly 10% the size of the global crude oil market, and that does not count the vast majority of natural gas which is delivered via pipeline directly from the well to the consumer.

In 2004, LNG accounted for 7 percent of the world's natural gas demand. The global trade in LNG, which has increased at a rate of 7.4 percent per year over the decade from 1995 to 2005, is expected to continue to grow substantially. LNG trade is expected to increase at 6.7 percent per year from 2005 to 2020.

Until the mid-1990s, LNG demand was heavily concentrated in Northeast Asia: Japan, South Korea and Taiwan. At the same time, Pacific Basin supplies dominated world LNG trade. The worldwide interest in using natural gas-fired combined cycle generating units for electric power generation, coupled with the inability of North American and North Sea natural gas supplies to meet the growing demand, substantially broadened the regional markets for LNG. It also brought new Atlantic Basin and Middle East suppliers into the trade.

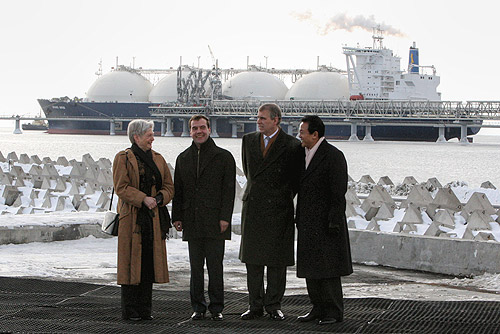
Russian and Western politicians visit the Sakhalin-II project on 18 February 2009.

By the end of 2017, there were 19 LNG exporting countries and 40 LNG importing countries. The three biggest LNG exporters in 2017 were Qatar (77.5 MT), Australia (55.6 MT) and Malaysia (26.9 MT). The three biggest LNG importers in 2017 were Japan (83.5 MT), China (39 MT) and South Korea (37.8 MT). LNG trade volumes increased from 142 MT in 2005 to 159 MT in 2006, 165 MT in 2007, 171 MT in 2008, 220 MT in 2010, 237 MT in 2013, 264 MT in 2016 and 290 MT in 2017. Global LNG production was 246 MT in 2014, most of which was used in trade between countries. During the next several years there would be significant increase in volume of LNG Trade. For example, about 59 MTPA of new LNG supply from six new plants came to market just in 2009, including:

- Northwest Shelf Train 5: 4.4 MTPA
- Sakhalin-II: 9.6 MTPA
- Yemen LNG: 6.7 MTPA
- Tangguh: 7.6 MTPA
- Qatargas: 15.6 MTPA
- Rasgas Qatar: 15.6 MTPA

In 2006, Qatar became the world's biggest exporter of LNG. As of 2012, Qatar is the source of 25 percent of the world's LNG exports. As of 2017, Qatar was estimated to supply 26.7% of the world's LNG.

Investments in U.S. export facilities were increasing by 2013, these investments were spurred by increasing shale gas production in the United States and a large price differential between natural gas prices in the U.S. and those in Europe and Asia. Cheniere Energy became the first company in the United States to receive permission and export LNG in 2016. After a US-EU agreement in 2018, exports from USA to EU increased. In November 2021, U.S. producer Venture Global LNG signed a twenty-year contract with China's state-owned Sinopec to supply liquefied natural gas, and China's imports of U.S. natural gas were expected to double. U.S. exports of liquefied natural gas to China and other Asian countries surged in 2021, with Asian buyers willing to pay higher prices than European importers. This reversed in 2022 due to European Union sanctions, when most of US LNG went to Europe. US LNG export contracts are mainly made for 15–20 years. Exports from the U.S. are likely to reach 13.3 Bcf/d in 2024 due to projects coming online on the Gulf of Mexico. In early 2026, Saudi Arabia signed a 20-year deal to receive 1 million tonnes of LNG per year from USA.

=== Imports ===
In 1964, the UK and France made the first LNG trade, buying gas from Algeria, witnessing a new era of energy.

In 2014, 19 countries exported LNG.

Compared with the crude oil market, in 2013 the natural gas market was about 72 percent of the crude oil market (measured on a heat equivalent basis), of which LNG forms a small but rapidly growing part. Much of this growth is driven by the need for clean fuel and some substitution effect due to the high price of oil (primarily in the heating and electricity generation sectors).

Japan, South Korea, Spain, France, Italy and Taiwan import large volumes of LNG due to their shortage of energy. In 2005, Japan imported 58.6 million tons of LNG, representing some 30 percent of the LNG trade around the world that year. Also in 2005, South Korea imported 22.1 million tons, and in 2004 Taiwan imported 6.8 million tons. These three major buyers purchase approximately two-thirds of the world's LNG demand. In addition, Spain imported some 8.2 MTPA in 2006, making it the third largest importer. France also imported similar quantities as Spain. Following the Fukushima Daiichi nuclear disaster in March 2011 Japan became a major importer accounting for one third of the total. European LNG imports fell by 30 percent in 2012, and fell further by 24 percent in 2013, as South American and Asian importers paid more. European LNG imports increased to new heights in 2019, remained high in 2020 and 2021, and increased even more in 2022. Main contributors were Qatar, USA, and Russia. In 2026, Saudi Arabia became an importer of LNG from USA.

In 2017, global LNG imports reached 289.8 million tonnes of LNG. In 2017, 72.9% of global LNG demand was located in Asia.

=== Cargo diversion ===
Based on the LNG SPAs, LNG is destined for pre-agreed destinations, and diversion of that LNG is not allowed. However, if Seller and Buyer make a mutual agreement, then the diversion of the cargo is permitted – subject to sharing the additional profit created by such a diversion, by paying a penalty fee. In the European Union and some other jurisdictions, it is not permitted to apply the profit-sharing clause in LNG SPAs.

=== Cost of LNG plants ===
For an extended period of time, design improvements in liquefaction plants and tankers had the effect of reducing costs.

In the 1980s, the cost of building an LNG liquefaction plant cost $350/tpa (tonne per annum). In the 2000s, it was $200/tpa. In 2012, the costs can go as high as $1,000/tpa, partly due to the increase in the price of steel.

As recently as 2003, it was common to assume that this was a "learning curve" effect and would continue into the future. But this perception of steadily falling costs for LNG has been dashed in the last several years.

The construction cost of greenfield LNG projects started to skyrocket from 2004 afterward and has increased from about $400 per ton per year of capacity to $1,000 per ton per year of capacity in 2008.

The main reasons for skyrocketed costs in LNG industry can be described as follows:

1. Low availability of EPC contractors as result of extraordinary high level of ongoing petroleum projects worldwide.
2. High raw material prices as result of surge in demand for raw materials.
3. Lack of skilled and experienced workforce in LNG industry.
4. Devaluation of US dollar.
5. Very complex nature of projects built in remote locations and where construction costs are regarded as some of the highest in the world.

Excluding high cost projects the increase of 120% over the period 2002–2012 is more in line with escalation in the upstream oil & gas industry as reported by the UCCI index

The 2008 financial crisis and the Great Recession led to a general decline in raw material and equipment prices, which somewhat lessened the construction cost of LNG plants. However, by 2012 this was more than offset by increasing demand for materials and labor for the LNG market. By 2026, a facility for 35 million tonnes per year may cost $33.5 Billion.

==== Small-scale liquefaction plants ====
Small-scale liquefaction plants are suitable for peakshaving on natural gas pipelines, transportation fuel, or for deliveries of natural gas to remote areas not connected to pipelines. They typically have a compact size, are fed from a natural gas pipeline, and are located close to the location where the LNG will be used. This proximity decreases transportation and LNG product costs for consumers. If leaks are handled, it may also avoid the additional greenhouse gas emissions generated during long transportation.

The small-scale LNG plant also allows localized peakshaving to occur—balancing the availability of natural gas during high and low periods of demand. It also makes it possible for communities without access to natural gas pipelines to install local distribution systems and have them supplied with stored LNG.

== LNG pricing ==
There are three major pricing systems in the current LNG contracts:

- Oil indexed contract, used primarily in Japan, Korea, Taiwan and China;
- Oil, oil products and other energy carriers indexed contracts, used primarily in Continental Europe; and
- Market indexed contracts, used in the US and the UK.

The formula for an indexed price is as follows:

CP = BP + β X

- BP: constant part or base price
- β: gradient
- X: indexation

The formula has been widely used in Asian LNG SPAs, where base price represents various non-oil factors, but usually a constant determined by negotiation at a level which can prevent LNG prices from falling below a certain level. It thus varies regardless of oil price fluctuation.

=== Henry Hub Plus ===
Some LNG buyers have already signed contracts for future US-based cargos at prices linked to Henry Hub prices. Cheniere Energy's LNG export contract pricing consists of a fixed fee (liquefaction tolling fee) plus 115% of Henry Hub per million British thermal units of LNG. Tolling fees in the Cheniere contracts vary: US$2.25 per million British thermal units ($7.7/MWh) with BG Group signed in 2011; $2.49 per million British thermal units ($8.5/MWh) with Spain's GNF signed in 2012; and $3.00 per million British thermal units ($10.2/MWh) with South Korea's Kogas and Centrica signed in 2013. Similar prices occurred in 2025.

=== Oil parity ===
Oil parity is the LNG price that would be equal to that of crude oil on a barrel of oil equivalent (BOE) basis. If the LNG price exceeds the price of crude oil in BOE terms, then the situation is called broken oil parity. A coefficient of 0.1724 results in full oil parity. In most cases the price of LNG is less than the price of crude oil in BOE terms.

In 2009, in several spot cargo deals especially in East Asia, oil parity approached the full oil parity or even exceeded oil parity. In January 2016, the spot LNG price of $5.461 per million British thermal units ($18.63/MWh) has broken oil parity when the Brent crude price (≤32 US$/bbl) has fallen steeply. By the end of June 2016, LNG price has fallen by nearly 50% below its oil parity price, making it more economical than more-polluting diesel/gas oil in the transport sector. LNG briefly touched the oil parity in winter of 2018/2019 and then rose above it during the recent global energy crisis in mid-2021 only falling below it in early 2024.

=== S-curve ===
Most of the LNG trade is governed by long-term contracts. Many formulae include an S-curve, where the price formula is different above and below a certain oil price, to dampen the impact of high oil prices on the buyer, and low oil prices on the seller. When the spot LNG price is cheaper than long term oil price indexed contracts, the most profitable LNG end use is to power mobile engines for replacing costly gasoline and diesel consumption.

In most of the East Asian LNG contracts, price formula is indexed to a basket of crude imported to Japan called the Japan Crude Cocktail (JCC). In Indonesian LNG contracts, price formula is linked to Indonesian Crude Price (ICP).

In continental Europe, the price formula indexation does not follow the same format, and it varies from contract to contract. Brent crude price (B), heavy fuel oil price (HFO), light fuel oil price (LFO), gas oil price (GO), coal price, electricity price and in some cases, consumer and producer price indexes are the indexation elements of price formulas.

=== Price review ===
Usually there exists a clause allowing parties to trigger the price revision or price reopening in LNG SPAs. In some contracts there are two options for triggering a price revision. regular and special. Regular ones are the dates that will be agreed and defined in the LNG SPAs for the purpose of price review.

== Quality of LNG ==
LNG quality is one of the most important issues in the LNG business. Any gas which does not conform to the agreed specifications in the sale and purchase agreement is regarded as "off-specification" (off-spec) or "off-quality" gas or LNG. Quality regulations serve three purposes:

1 – to ensure that the gas distributed is non-corrosive and non-toxic, below the upper limits for H_{2}S, total sulphur, CO_{2} and Hg content;

2 – to guard against the formation of liquids or hydrates in the networks, through maximum water and hydrocarbon dewpoints;

3 – to allow interchangeability of the gases distributed, via limits on the variation range for parameters affecting combustion: content of inert gases, calorific value, Wobbe index, Soot Index, Incomplete Combustion Factor, Yellow Tip Index, etc.

In the case of off-spec gas or LNG the buyer can refuse to accept the gas or LNG and the seller has to pay liquidated damages for the respective off-spec gas volumes.

The quality of gas or LNG is measured at delivery point by using an instrument such as a gas chromatograph.

The most important gas quality concerns involve the sulphur and mercury content and the calorific value. Due to the sensitivity of liquefaction facilities to sulfur and mercury elements, the gas being sent to the liquefaction process shall be accurately refined and tested in order to assure the minimum possible concentration of these two elements before entering the liquefaction plant, hence there is not much concern about them.

However, the main concern is the heating value of gas. Usually natural gas markets can be divided in three markets in terms of heating value:

- Asia (Japan, Korea, Taiwan), where gas distributed is rich, with a gross calorific value (GCV) higher than 43 MJ/m^{3}(n), i.e. 1,090 Btu/scf,
- the UK and the US, where distributed gas is lean, with a GCV usually lower than 42 MJ/m^{3}(n), i.e. 1,065 Btu/scf,
- Continental Europe, where the acceptable GCV range is quite wide: approx. 39 to 46 MJ/m^{3}(n), i.e. 990 to 1,160 Btu/scf.

There are some methods to modify the heating value of produced LNG to the desired level. For the purpose of increasing the heating value, injecting propane and butane is a solution. For the purpose of decreasing heating value, nitrogen injecting and extracting butane and propane are proven solutions. Blending with gas or LNG can be a solution; however all of these solutions while theoretically viable can be costly and logistically difficult to manage in large scale. Lean LNG price in terms of energy value is lower than the rich LNG price.

== Liquefaction technology ==
There are several liquefaction processes available for large, baseload LNG plants:

1. AP-C3MR – designed by Air Products & Chemicals, Inc. (APCI)
2. Cascade – designed by ConocoPhillips
3. AP-X – designed by Air Products & Chemicals, Inc. (APCI)
4. AP-SMR (Single Mixed Refrigerant) – designed by Air Products & Chemicals, Inc. (APCI)
5. AP-N (Nitrogen Refrigerant) – designed by Air Products & Chemicals, Inc. (APCI)
6. MFC (mixed fluid cascade) – designed by Linde
7. PRICO (SMR) – designed by Black & Veatch
8. Shell DMR (Dual Mixed Refrigerant) - designed by Shell
9. AP-DMR (Dual Mixed Refrigerant) – designed by Air Products & Chemicals, Inc. (APCI)
10. Liquefin – designed by Air Liquide
11. IPSMR (Integrated Pre-cooled Single Mixed Refrigerant) – designed by Chart Industries

As of January 2016, global nominal LNG liquefaction capacity was 301.5 MTPA (million tonnes per annum), with a further 142 MTPA under construction.

The majority of these trains use either APCI AP-C3MR or Cascade technology for the liquefaction process. The other processes, used in a small minority of some liquefaction plants, include Shell's DMR (double-mixed refrigerant) technology and the Linde technology.

APCI technology is the most-used liquefaction process in LNG plants: out of 100 liquefaction trains onstream or under-construction, 86 trains with a total capacity of 243 MTPA have been designed based on the APCI process. Phillips' Cascade process is the second most-used, used in 10 trains with a total capacity of 36.16 MTPA. The Shell DMR process has been used in three trains with total capacity of 13.9 MTPA; and, finally, the Linde/Statoil process is used in the Snohvit 4.2 MTPA single train.

Floating liquefied natural gas (FLNG) facilities float above an offshore gas field, and produce, liquefy, store and transfer LNG (and potentially LPG and condensate) at sea before carriers ship it directly to markets. The first FLNG facility to produce and export LNG was PFLNG1 in 2017, built and operated by Petronas.

=== Storage ===
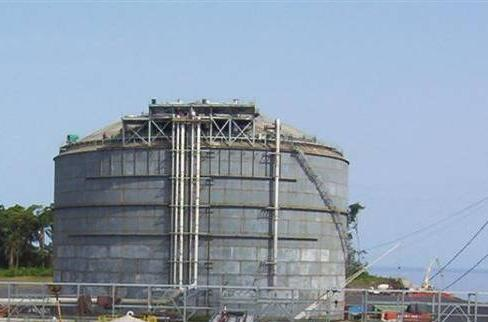
LNG storage tank at EG LNG

Modern LNG storage tanks are typically of the full containment type, which has a prestressed concrete outer wall and a high-nickel steel inner tank, with extremely efficient insulation between the walls. Large tanks are low aspect ratio (height to width) and cylindrical in design with a domed steel or concrete roof. Storage pressure in these tanks is very low, less than 10 kilopascals (1.5 psi). Sometimes more expensive underground tanks are used for storage. Smaller quantities (say 700 cubic metres (180,000 US gal) and less) may be stored in horizontal or vertical, vacuum-jacketed, pressure vessels. These tanks may be at pressures anywhere from less than 50 to over 1,700 kPa (7.3–246.6 psi).

LNG must be kept cold to remain a liquid due to the low pressures used for storage. Despite efficient insulation, there will inevitably be some heat leakage into the LNG, resulting in vaporization of the LNG. This boil-off gas acts to keep the LNG cold (see "Refrigeration" below). The boil-off gas is typically compressed and exported as natural gas, or it is reliquefied and returned to storage.

=== Transportation ===
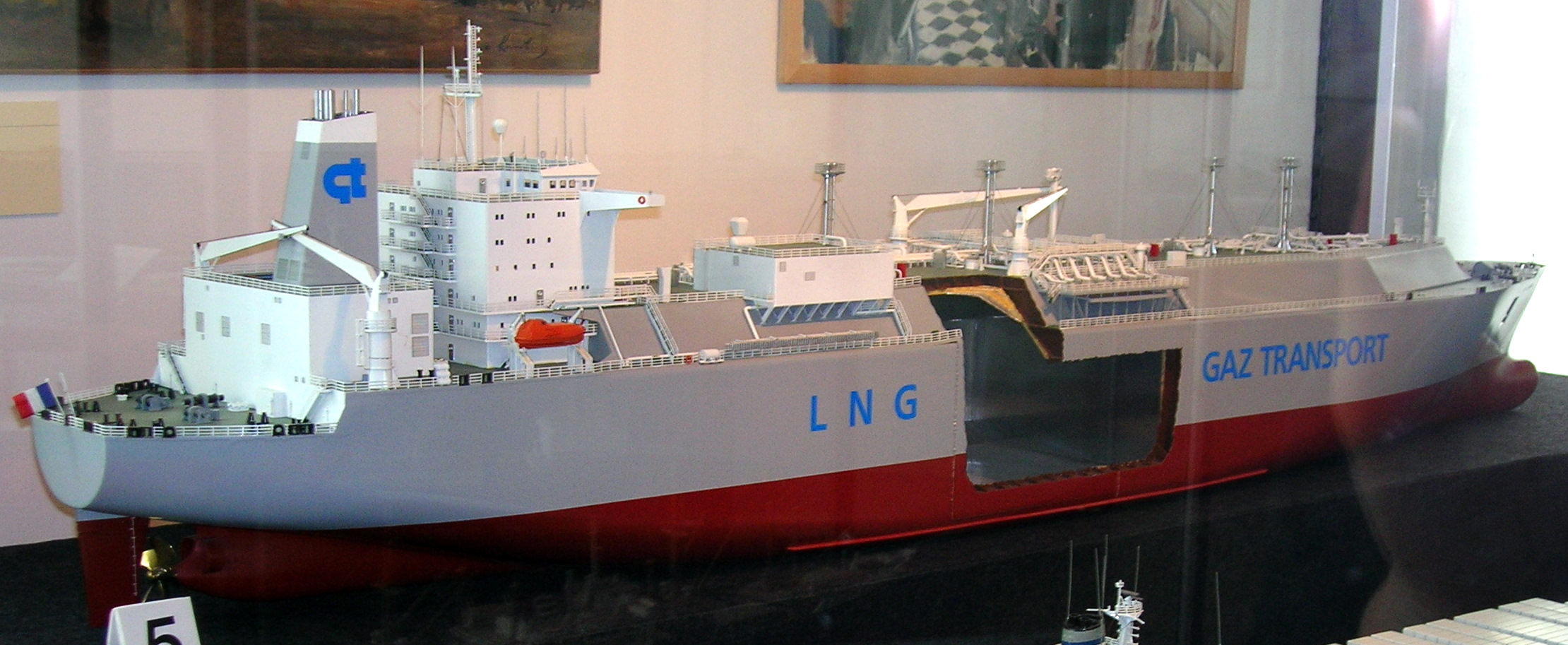
Model of tanker LNG Rivers, with an LNG capacity of 135,000 cubic meters

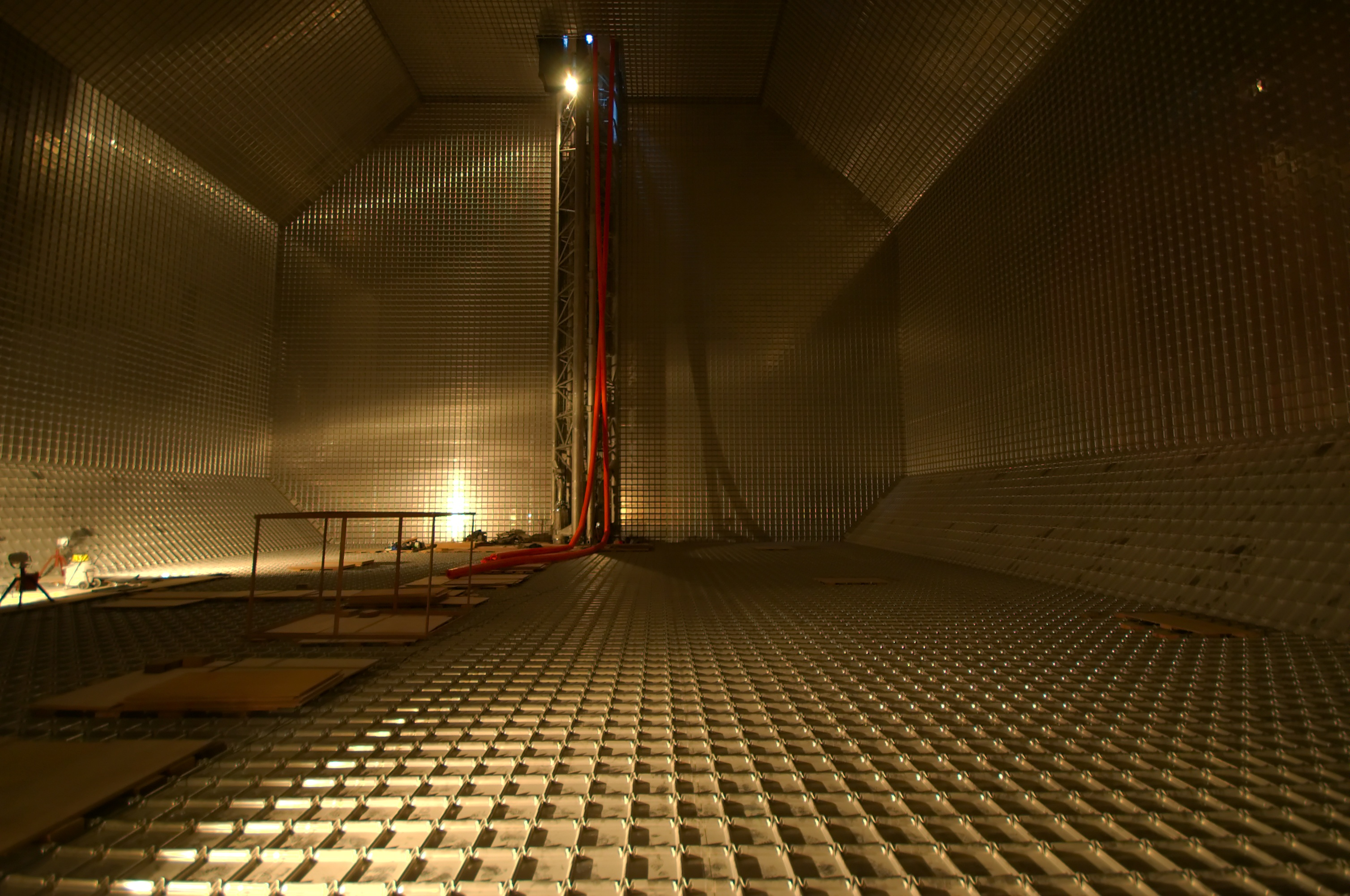
Interior of an LNG cargo tank

LNG is transported in specially designed ships with double hulls protecting the cargo systems from damage or leaks. There are several special leak test methods available to test the integrity of an LNG vessel's membrane cargo tanks.

The tankers cost around US$200 million each.

Transportation and supply is an important aspect of the gas business, since natural gas reserves are normally quite distant from consumer markets. Natural gas has far more volume than oil to transport, and most gas is transported by pipelines. There is a natural gas pipeline network in the former Soviet Union, Europe and North America. Natural gas is less dense, even at higher pressures. Natural gas will travel much faster than oil through a high-pressure pipeline, but can transmit only about a fifth of the amount of energy per day due to the lower density. Natural gas is usually liquefied to LNG at the end of the pipeline, before shipping.

Short LNG pipelines for use in moving product from LNG vessels to onshore storage are available. Longer pipelines, which allow vessels to offload LNG at a greater distance from port facilities, are under development. This requires pipe-in-pipe technology due to requirements for keeping the LNG cold.

LNG is transported using tanker trucks, railway tanker cars, and purpose built ships known as LNG carriers. LNG is sometimes taken to cryogenic temperatures to increase the tanker capacity. The first commercial ship-to-ship transfer (STS) transfers were undertaken in February 2007 at the Flotta facility in Scapa Flow with 132,000 m^{3} of LNG being passed between the vessels Excalibur and Excelsior. Transfers have also been carried out by Exmar Shipmanagement, the Belgian gas tanker owner in the Gulf of Mexico, which involved the transfer of LNG from a conventional LNG carrier to an LNG regasification vessel (LNGRV). Before this commercial exercise, LNG had only ever been transferred between ships on a handful of occasions as a necessity following an incident. The Society of International Gas Tanker and Terminal Operators (SIGTTO) is the responsible body for LNG operators around the world and seeks to disseminate knowledge regarding the safe transport of LNG at sea.

Besides LNG vessels, LNG is also used in some aircraft.

==== Terminals ====
Liquefied natural gas is used to transport natural gas over long distances, often by sea. In most cases, LNG terminals are purpose-built ports used exclusively to export or import LNG.

The United Kingdom has LNG import facilities for up to 50 billion cubic meters per year.

=== Refrigeration ===
The insulation, as efficient as it is, will not keep LNG cold enough by itself. Inevitably, heat leakage will warm and vaporize the LNG. Industry practice is to store LNG as a boiling cryogen. That is, the liquid is stored at its boiling point for the pressure at which it is stored (atmospheric pressure). As the vapor boils off, heat for the phase change cools the remaining liquid. Because the insulation is very efficient, only a relatively small amount of boil-off is necessary to maintain temperature. This phenomenon is also called auto-refrigeration.

Boil-off gas from land based LNG storage tanks is usually compressed and fed to natural gas pipeline networks. Some LNG carriers use boil-off gas for fuel.

== Environmental concerns ==
Over its lifecycle, LNG produces around 25% less greenhouse gas emissions per unit of energy than coal, the most polluting fossil fuel. This small difference can be explained by additional emissions from processing, distributing and liquefying the gas. When only emissions at combustion are taken into account, burning natural gas produces about 45% less than burning coal for an equivalent amount of heat.

On a per kilometer transported basis, emissions from LNG are lower than piped natural gas, which is a particular issue in Europe, where significant amounts of gas are piped several thousand kilometers from Russia. However, emissions from natural gas transported as LNG can be higher than those of natural gas produced regionally and piped to the point of combustion, as emissions associated with transport are lower for the latter.

Some scientists and local residents have raised concerns about the potential effect of Poland's underground LNG storage infrastructure on marine life in the Baltic Sea. Similar concerns were raised in Croatia. Biomethane is considered roughly CO_{2}-neutral and avoids most of the CO_{2}-emissions issue. If liquefied (as LBM), it serves the same functions as LNG.

=== Safety and accidents ===
Natural gas is a fuel and a combustible substance. To ensure safe and reliable operation, particular measures are taken in the design, construction and operation of LNG facilities. In maritime transport, the regulations for the use of LNG as a marine fuel are set out in the IGF Code.

In its liquid state, LNG is not explosive and can not ignite. For LNG to burn, it must first vaporize, then mix with air in the proper proportions (the flammable range is 5 percent to 15 percent), and then be ignited. In the case of a leak, LNG vaporizes rapidly, turning into a gas (methane plus trace gases), and mixing with air. If this mixture is within the flammable range, there is risk of ignition, which would create fire and thermal radiation hazards.

Gas venting from vehicles powered by LNG may create a flammability hazard if parked indoors for longer than a week. Additionally, due to its low temperature, refueling an LNG-powered vehicle requires training to avoid the risk of frostbite.

LNG tankers have sailed over 100 million miles (160,000,000 km) without a shipboard death or even a major accident.

Several on-site accidents involving or related to LNG are listed below:

- October 20, 1944, Cleveland, Ohio, U.S. The East Ohio Natural Gas Co. experienced a failure of an LNG tank. 128 people perished in the explosion and fire. The tank did not have a dike retaining wall, and it was made during World War II, when metal rationing was very strict. The steel of the tank was made with an extremely low amount of nickel, which meant the tank was brittle when exposed to the cryogenic nature of LNG. The tank ruptured, spilling LNG into the city sewer system. The LNG vaporized and turned into gas, which exploded and burned.
- February 10, 1973, Staten Island, New York, U.S. During a cleaning operation, 42 workers were inside one of the TETCo LNG tanks, which had supposedly been completely drained ten months earlier. However, ignition occurred, causing a plume of combusting gas to rise within the tank. Two workers near the top felt the heat and rushed to the safety of scaffolding outside, while the other 40 workers died as the concrete cap on the tank rose 20–30 feet (6.1–9.1 m) in the air and then came crashing back down, crushing them to death.
- October 6, 1979, Lusby, Maryland, US. A pump seal failed at the Cove Point LNG import facility, releasing natural gas vapors (not LNG), which entered an electrical conduit. A worker switched off a circuit breaker, which ignited the gas vapors. The resulting explosion killed a worker, severely injured another and caused heavy damage to the building. A safety analysis was not required at the time, and none was performed during the planning, design or construction of the facility. National fire codes were changed as a result of the accident.
- January 19, 2004, Skikda, Algeria. Explosion at Sonatrach LNG liquefaction facility. 27 killed, 56 injured, three LNG trains destroyed, a marine berth damaged. 2004 production was reduced by 76 percent. Total loss was US$900 million. A steam boiler that was part of an LNG liquefaction train exploded, triggering a massive hydrocarbon gas explosion. The explosion occurred where propane and ethane refrigeration storage were located. Site distribution of the units caused a domino effect of explosions. It remains unclear if LNG or LNG vapour, or other hydrocarbon gases forming part of the liquefaction process initiated the explosions. One report, of the US Government Team Site Inspection of the Sonatrach Skikda LNG Plant in Skikda, Algeria, March 12–16, 2004, has cited it was a leak of hydrocarbons from the refrigerant (liquefaction) process system.

== Security concerns ==
On 8 May 2018, the United States withdrew from the Joint Comprehensive Plan of Action with Iran, reinstating Iran sanctions against their nuclear program. In response, Iran threatened to close off the Strait of Hormuz to international shipping. The Strait of Hormuz is a strategic route through which a third of the world's LNG passes from Middle East producers.

In January 2024, Qatar halted tankers of liquefied natural gas through the strait of Bab-el-Mandeb after US-led airstrikes on Houthi targets in Yemen increased risks in the strait. The LNG tankers were forced to sail around Africa via the Cape of Good Hope to avoid the war zone.

== See also ==
- Gas carrier – Ship designed to transport liquefied chemical gases in bulk
- CNG carrier – High-pressure natural gas ship
- Gas to liquids – Conversion of natural gas to liquid petroleum products
- Gasoline gallon equivalent – Amount of an alternative fuel with equal energy content
- Industrial gas – Gaseous materials produced for use in industry
- Liquefied petroleum gas – Fuel for heating, cooking and vehicles
- LNG Canada – Industrial energy project in Kitimat, BC, Canada
- Regasification – Process of converting liquefied natural gas
- LNG spill – Liquefied natural gas spillage
- Natural-gas condensate – Low-density mixture of hydrocarbon liquids
- Natural gas storage – Facilities for storing natural gas
- Peak gas – Year when the maximum rate of gas production is reached
