= Cleveland East Ohio Gas explosion =

1944 industrial accident

Coordinates: 41°31′37″N 81°38′56″W

- Date: October 20, 1944; 82 years ago
- Location: Cleveland, Ohio, U.S.
- Deaths: 131
- Injuries: 225+

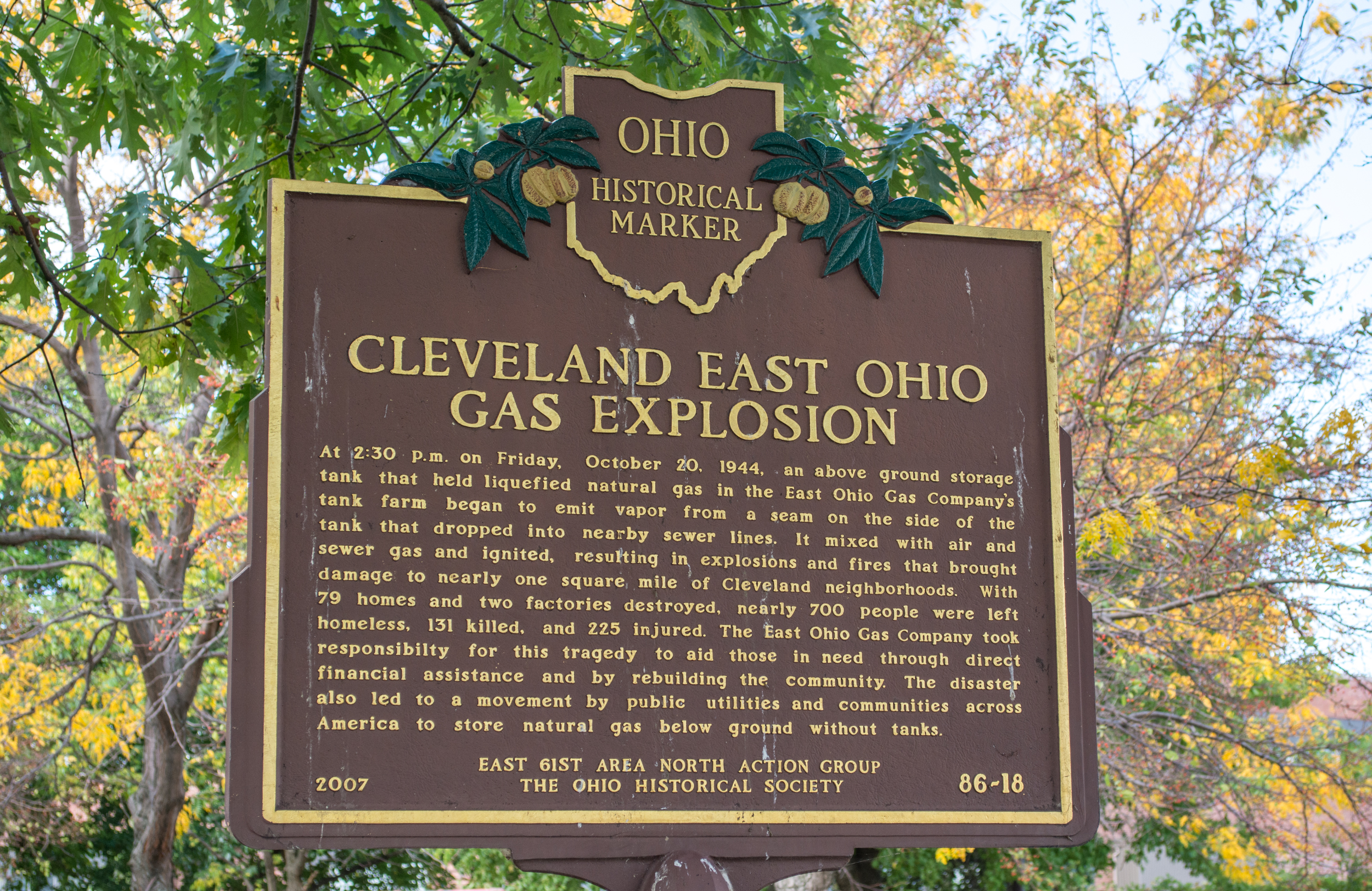
Historic signage in Grdina Park, just south of the site of the LNG tank farm.

The Cleveland East Ohio Gas explosion occurred on the afternoon of Friday, October 20, 1944. The resulting gas leak, explosion and fires killed 131 people and destroyed a one-square-mile area on the east side of Cleveland, Ohio.

== History ==
The East Ohio Gas Company built a full-scale commercial liquid natural gas (LNG) plant in Cleveland, Ohio in 1940, just after a successful pilot plant was built by its sister company, Hope Natural Gas Company of West Virginia. This was the first such plant in the world. Originally it had three spheres, approximately 63 feet (19 m) in diameter containing LNG at −260 °F (−162 °C). Each sphere held the equivalent of about 50 million US gallons (190,000 m^{3}) of natural gas. A fourth tank, a cylinder, was added in 1942. It had an equivalent capacity of 100 million US gallons (380,000 m^{3}) of gas. The plant operated successfully for three years. The stored liquid was regasified and put into the mains when cold snaps hit and extra capacity was needed; formerly, some customers' gas service was curtailed during a cold snap.

== The disaster ==
At 2:30 p.m. on the afternoon of Friday, October 20, 1944, the cylindrical above-ground storage tank number 4, holding liquefied natural gas in the East Ohio Gas Company's tank farm, began to emit a vapor that poured from a seam on the side of the tank. Experts criticized the cylinder's untested shape and materials. The tank was located near Lake Erie on East 61st Street, and winds from the lake pushed the vapor into a mixed-use section of Cleveland, where it dropped into the sewer lines via the catch basins located in the street gutters.

As the gas mixture flowed and mixed with air and sewer gas, the mixture ignited. In the ensuing explosion, manhole covers launched skyward as jets of fire erupted from depths of the sewer lines. One manhole cover was found several miles east in the Cleveland neighborhood of Glenville.

At first it was thought that the disaster was contained, and spectators returned home thinking that the matter was being taken care of by the fire department. At 3:00 p.m., a second above-ground tank exploded, leveling the tank farm.

However, the explosions and fires continued to occur, trapping many who had returned to what they thought was the safety of their own homes. Housewives who were at home suddenly found their homes engulfed in flame as the explosion traveled through the sewers and up through drains. The following day, Associated Press wire stories contained quotes from survivors, many of whom were at home cleaning in preparation for the coming Sabbath. Survivors said that within a split second after the explosion, their homes and clothes were on fire.

Cuyahoga County Coroner Dr. Samuel Gerber estimated that the initial death toll stood at 200; however, Gerber was quoted in newspaper wire stories stating the magnitude of the fire and the intense temperatures had the power to vaporize human flesh and bone, making an exact count impossible until weeks after the disaster. The final death toll [131] was lower than the coroner's initial estimates.

The toll could have been significantly higher had the event occurred after local schools had let out and working parents returned to their homes for the evening. In all 131 persons died; 225 persons were injured; over 700 people were left homeless, and seventy-nine homes, two factories, numerous cars, and miles of underground infrastructure were destroyed.

Following the explosions and fires, East Ohio Gas worked to assure the public that the destroyed plant held only 24 hours' worth of gas for the city. Many families living in the area not only lost their homes, but stocks, bonds, and cash, which many kept at home. Estimates for destroyed personal and industrial property ranged between $7 million and $15 million.

The explosion also had a long-range impact on the natural gas industry. Until the disaster, above-ground low-pressure storage of natural gas, used as fuel for homes, office buildings, and factories, was a common sight in cities across the US. Following the disaster, utility companies and communities began to rethink their natural gas storage systems, and below-ground storage of natural gas grew in popularity.

The disaster plays a major role in Don Robertson's 1965 novel The Greatest Thing Since Sliced Bread and also in Sebastian Barry's novel On Canaan's Side published in 2011.

The East Ohio Gas explosion was calculated to equal a 2.43 kiloton TNT explosion or one-sixth of the Hiroshima atomic bomb.
