= Edku =

Edku إدكو
- Town
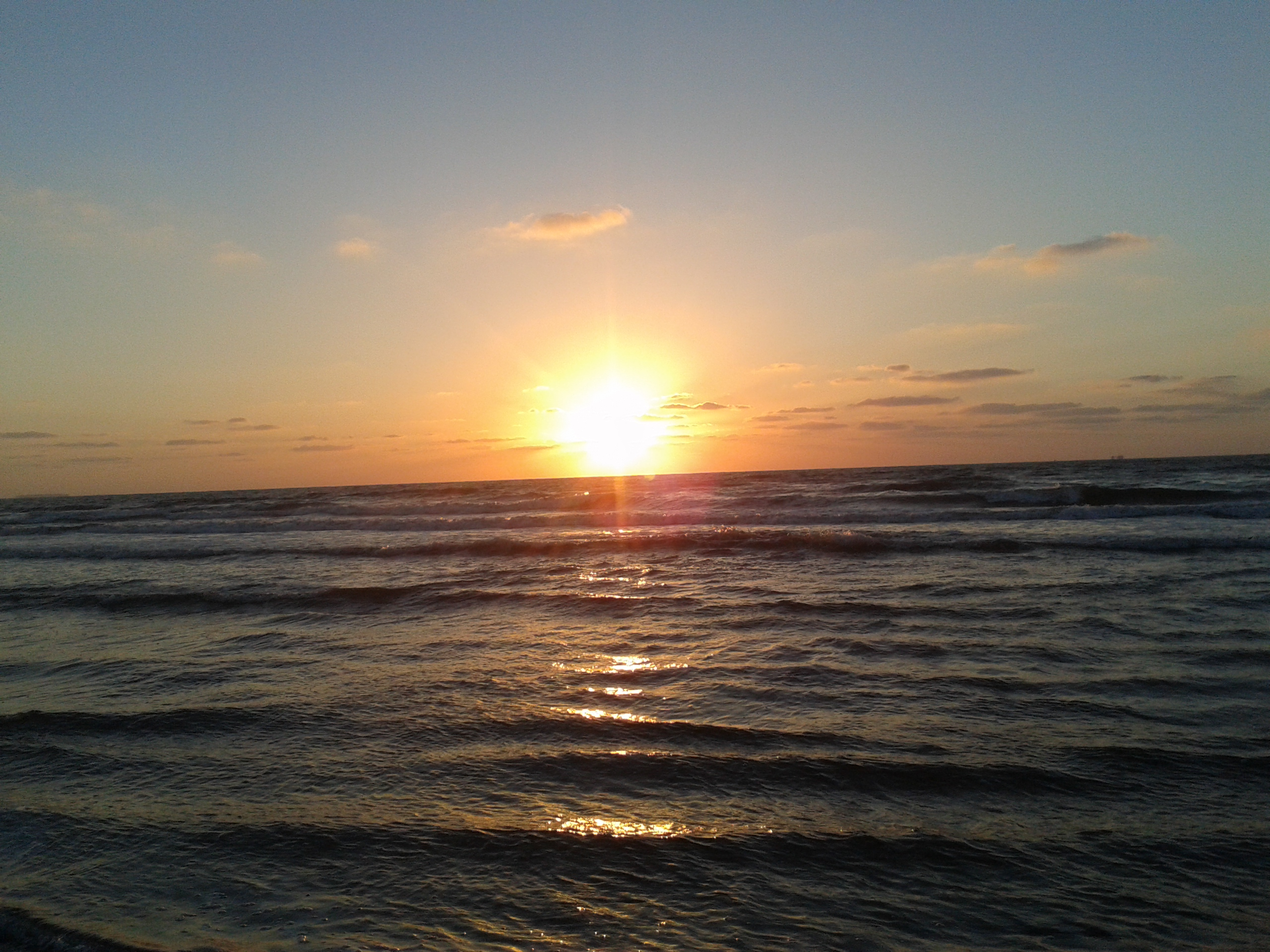
- Edku beach
- Nickname: Idkū
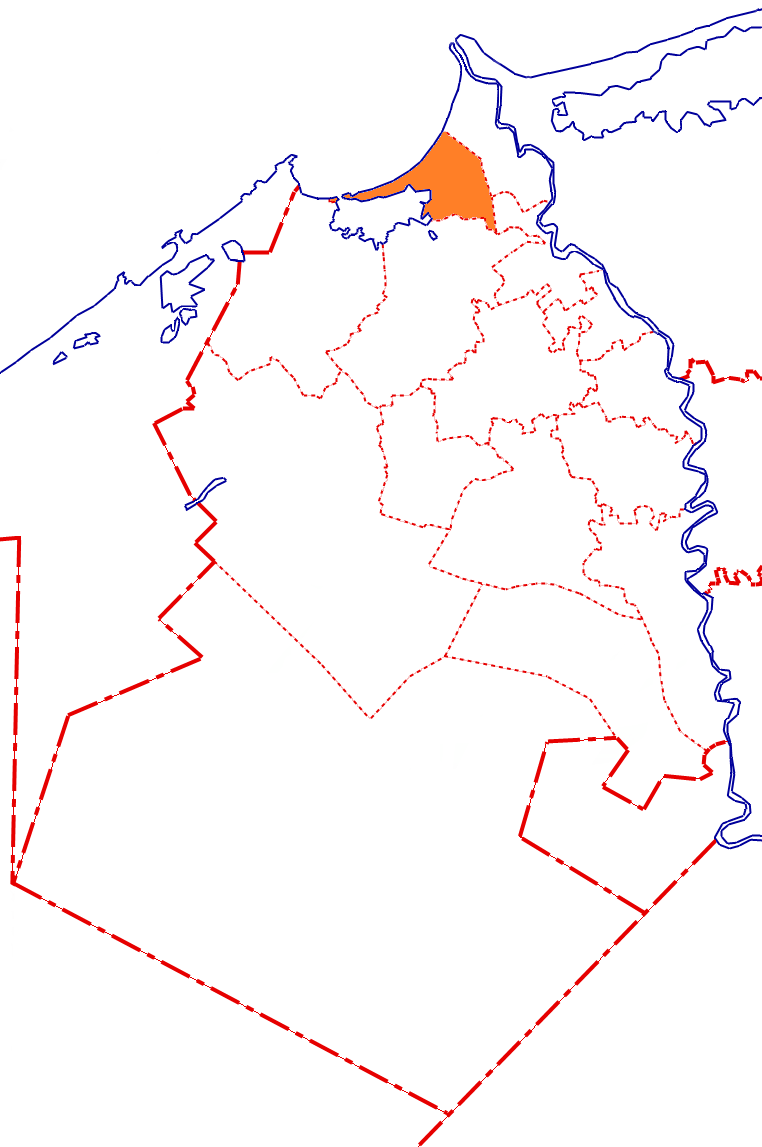
- Location in Beheira Governorate

- Location in Egypt Edku (Egypt)
- Coordinates: 31°18′N 30°18′E
- Country: Egypt
- Governorate: Beheira

Area
  - Total: 182.1 km^{2} (70.3 sq mi)
- Elevation: 9 m (30 ft)

Population (2023)
  - Total: 259,648
  - Density: 1,426/km^{2} (3,693/sq mi)
- Time zone: UTC+2 (EET)
  - Summer (DST): UTC+3 (EEST)
- Postal code: 22748
- Area code: (+20) 045

Edku (Arabic: إدكو) (also Edkhou or Idku) is a town in the Beheira Governorate, located east of Alexandria and west of Rashid, overlooking the Mediterranean Sea. Edku lies on a sandy strip behind Abi Qir Bay, in the northwestern Nile River delta. Immediately south is Lake Idku, a 58-square-mile (150-square-km) lagoon that stretches some 22 miles (35 km) behind and parallel to the coast and has a maximum width of 16 miles (26 km). Drained by Al-Madiyyah Channel, connecting with the Mediterranean, the lagoon is reputed to be the ancient Canopic branch of the Nile. Edku's isthmus position enables it to capitalize on the fisheries of both the lagoon and the Mediterranean. Other industries include rice milling and silk weaving. Edku is linked by coastal road and railway to Alexandria, 26 miles (42 km) to the west-southwest, and Rosetta (Rashid), 12 miles (19 km) northeast.

Just northeast of the town lies a large natural gas liquefaction (LNG) plant jointly owned by Shell and Petronas. The plant complex opened in 2005 and consists of two LNG trains capable of liquefying up to a total of 7.2 million tons of natural gas per year. It is one of two LNG export plants in Egypt (the other being the SEGAS LNG plant in Damietta).

== History ==
Edku was one of the ancient cities of the Pharaonic era.

The al-Hamsaniya mosque in Edku used to have a statue dedicated to Horus as a base for one of its minarets. It was within the province of "Ra Amenati", where many ancient pharaonic cities have become uninhabited to be replaced by other cities, including the city of "Tajo", which is Edku currently, and some historians believe that the name of Edco Pharaonic is " Jackat " which means in Ancient Egyptian language the high hill, and it is clear that the urbanization is related to the sandy hills north of Lake Idku and also tells one of the historians that its ancient name is mentioned in the bishop's revelation in the name of Etco.

Idku was conquered in the succession of Omar bin Al-Khattab by order of him to the leader Amr ibn Al-Aas at the hands of "Abdullah bin Omar," and the governor of Idku was "Zarand". The king and his army took refuge in the forts and closed the walls, and the Arabs surrounded them, and the siege lasted for six months.

The 1885 Census of Egypt recorded Edku as a nahiyah in the district of Atf in Gharbia Governorate; at that time, the population of the town was 5,751 (2,937 men and 2,814 women).
