= RasGas =

Former LNG producing company in Qatar

Coordinates: 25°53′27″N 51°32′33″E

- Native name: راس غاز
- Industry: Oil and gas
- Founded: 1998
- Defunct: 31 December 2017
- Headquarters: Doha, Qatar
- Products: Liquefied natural gas
- Parent: QatarEnergy

RasGas Company Limited was a liquefied natural gas (LNG) producing company in Qatar. It was the second-biggest LNG producer in Qatar after QatarEnergy LNG. RasGas operated seven LNG trains located in Ras Laffan Industrial City. It was merged with Qatargas on 1 January 2018.

RasGas also operated helium plants which produce 25% of the world's helium, and make Qatar the second largest helium exporter.

The chief executive officer of the company was Hamad Mubarak Al-Muhannadi.

== History ==
RasGas' former corporate headquarters in West Bay, Doha pictured in 2011

Ras Laffan LNG, commonly known as RasGas, was the name of one of the two initial LNG projects in Qatar, which were founded in and together with the Ras Laffan Industrial Complex in the 1990s. The project was initiated by Qatargas together with its partner ExxonMobil, and later also included other foreign investors. The project started production in 1999. The company RasGas was then established in a joint stock company between QatarEnergy and ExxonMobil in 2001. It was set up as the operating company for the production facilities based in Ras Laffan Industrial City, Qatar.

During the early 2000s, RasGas started operating additional LNG facilities (LNG trains) and signed several long-term sales agreements with South Korea, India and other countries.

Train 6 came online in October 2009, and was inaugurated on 27 October 2009. Sheikh Hamad bin Khalifa Al-Thani, the Emir of Qatar, attended the ceremony. Train 7 started production in February 2010. Both trains produce 7.8 million tonnes of LNG per year and they among the largest LNG trains in the world.

In 2007, RasGas started talks for a new gas project in order to meet continually growing local demand. In 2011, the company then closed a $10.5 billion financing deal for the Barzan Gas project, adding a gas production capacity of 1.4 bcf/day. Construction for the projects two trains began in 2011 and was expected to finish by late 2014 / early 2015. The project was then expected to come online in October 2016, but was further delayed because of technical challenges.

In 2013, RasGas became the victim of a series of Cyberattacks, which together with attacks on Saudi Aramco and other companies, were attributed to Iran's "cybercorps".

In 2016, RasGas celebrated its 10,000th LNG vessel loading at Ras Laffan Industrial City's port.

Rasgas was merged with Qatargas on 1 January 2018. The merger had first been announced in 2016 and was implemented on time.

== Organization ==
From 2006 to 2011, Mohammed Saleh Al Sada served as the managing director of RasGas.

== Operations ==
RasGas operations consisted of the extraction, processing, liquefaction, storage and export of LNG and all associated derivatives from Qatars North Field.

The company's seven LNG trains had a total capacity of 36.3 million tonnes of LNG per year. Trains 1 and 2 were owned by Ras Laffan, and they have a combined capacity of 6.6 million tonnes of LNG per year. Ras Laffan (II) owns Trains 3, 4 and 5 with a capacity of 4.7 million tonnes of LNG per annum each. Trains 6 and 7 are owned by Ras Laffan (3).

RasGas operated Helium 1 and Helium 2 helium plants. Helium 1 produces 660 million cubic feet per year (19 million cubic metres per year) of liquid helium, which is approximately 10 percent of the world's total helium production. Helium 2 is the world's largest helium refining facility. It produces 1.3 billion cubic feet per year (37 million cubic metres per year) of liquid helium. Together, these two plants now produce 25% of the world's helium, making Qatar the second largest world helium exporter, after the U.S.

RasGas also operated the Al Khaleej Gas Projects, AKG-1 and AKG-2, which supply a daily average of around 2.0 billion cubic feet (57 million cubic metres) at standard conditions to Qatar's network of pipelines, delivering gas for the growing domestic market.
