= SEGAS LNG =

Egyptian LNG

SEGAS LNG is a liquefied natural gas (LNG) complex in Damietta, Egypt. It is located 60 kilometres (37 mi) west of Port Said. The name SEGAS comes from the Spanish Egyptian Gas Company. The complex consists of a single LNG train capable of liquifying up to 5 million tons of natural gas per year and is one of two LNG export plants in Egypt (the other being a two-train 7.2Mt/yr LNG plant in Idku, owned by Shell and Petronas which commenced operation in 2005).

== History ==
The LNG plant was ordered in 2000 and the construction works started in September 2001. The complex came on-stream in December 2004 and the first cargo was loaded on 20 January 2005. When SEGAS LNG became operational, it was the largest single train LNG plant in the world.

On 28 March 2005 Eni, BP, and EGAS signed a memorandum of understanding of construction of the second train. On 19 June 2006, partners signed the framework agreement for the expansion of the capacity of the LNG plant to 10 million tonnes per year. It was planned to be supplied from the Satis gas discovery in the offshore Nile Delta. However, the plan was postponed due limited gas reserves and increased domestic demand in Egypt.

== Technical features ==
The output capacity of the plant is 5 million tons of LNG per year. The initial capacity was designed to be 5.5 million tons of LNG per year. The complex includes the LNG liquefaction train, inlet gas reception area (metering and analysis), natural gas liquids removal and fractionation area, a docking jetty for tanker loading and transportation, LNG refrigerated storage and export facilities (tanks and booms), utilities and supporting infrastructure (power, water and roads), gas metering and treatment facilities (acid gas removal and dehydration), refrigerant condensate and LNG storage (two 150,000 m³ PC LNG storage tanks). The total investment costs of the LNG complex were around US$1.3 billion.

The Damietta LNG complex was designed by KBR and constructed by KBR, JGC Corporation, M. W. Kellogg Limited and Técnicas Reunidas. Saipem constructed storage tanks while Dodsal Pte Ltd was the subcontractor responsible for the construction of the mechanical works of LNG train.

== Gas supply ==
The plant was originally supplied by natural gas from the West Delta Deep Marine (WDDM) Concession Area about 140 kilometres (90 mi) from the LNG complex. It is supplied by the Egyptian Natural Gas Holding Company (EGAS).

== Export markets ==
Produced LNG is exported mainly to the Spanish market via a new receiving terminal at Sagunto. 3.2 million tons of LNG per year is taken by Unión Fenosa Gas. The rest of the LNG is sold by the Egyptian Natural Gas Holding Company.

== Plant closure and reopening ==
In mid-2013 the LNG complex was shut due to the lack of natural gas. The gas that had acted as feedstock for the plant was diverted to satisfy domestic gas demand in Egypt. Gas supply was only restored in February 2021, following the startup of the Zohr gas field and the commencement of gas imports to Egypt from Israel via pipeline.

== Operating company ==
The LNG complex is operated by SEGAS, which is controlled by Unión Fenosa Gas, a joint venture of Unión Fenosa and Eni. Unión Fenosa Gas owns 80% of SEGAS shares. Minor share holders are the Egyptian Natural Gas Holding Company (EGAS - 10%) and the Egyptian General Petroleum Corporation (EGPC – 10%).

== See also ==
- Energy in Egypt
