= Don Robertson (author) =

American novelist

Don Robertson (March 21, 1929 – March 21, 1999) was an American novelist. He wrote 19 novels, one published posthumously.

Robertson is probably best known for his trio of novels featuring Morris Bird III: The Greatest Thing Since Sliced Bread, The Sum and Total of Now, and The Greatest Thing That Almost Happened. A movie adaptation of The Greatest Thing That Almost Happened aired on NBC in 1977, starring Jimmie Walker and James Earl Jones.

== Early life ==
Robertson was born on March 21, 1929, in Cleveland, Ohio, to Josephine Wuebben Robertson and Carl Trowbridge Robertson, an associate editor of The Plain Dealer. Robertson lived until 1946 on Cleveland's east side, in Hough, and graduated from East High School.

== Education and early career ==
After stints in the Army and at Harvard and Western Reserve University (now Case Western Reserve University), he became a reporter and columnist for The Plain Dealer (1950-1955 and 1963–1966), The Cleveland News (1957–1959), and The Cleveland Press (1968–1982).

He reviewed movies and theater for the NBC's Cleveland affiliate WKYC-TV in the late 1970s and early ’80s, as well as "won a following as a no-nonsense, tell-it-like-it-is radio and TV talk show host." He also got involved in live theater.

== Novels and film ==
Most of Robertson's novels were set in Ohio, and the fictional town of Paradise Falls, Ohio, figured in many of them. Paradise Falls was also the title of one of his longest novels. Additionally, much of Robertson's fiction was set in the recent past, or a few generations past. His 1964 novel A Flag Full of Stars, for instance, was set during the 1948 U.S. elections. Like John O'Hara, Robertson often linked novels that were not substantially related by including brief allusions to characters and events in his previous works.

His fascinations with history and human lives were evident from his first novels, a Civil War trilogy (1959–1962). Set in Cleveland between 1944 and 1953, each of the three Morris Bird III novels revolves around a major event in the city's history: the East Ohio Gas explosion, the Indians winning the pennant, and the Korean War.

In 1987, Stephen King’s Philtrum Press published Robertson’s novel, The Ideal, Genuine Man. King has acknowledged Robertson as one of his influences. In the 1992 film Sleepwalkers, which was written by King, a main character pretends to have moved from Paradise Falls, Ohio which is not a real place in the film's universe.

Crown published Robertson's final novel, Prisoners of Twilight, in 1989. The early title of this book was Companion to Owls.

In April 2008, HarperCollins Publisher reissued The Greatest Thing Since Sliced Bread in paperback. Berkley Trade (a division of Penguin Books) reissued The Sum and Total of Now in August 2009, and HarperCollins Publisher reissued The Greatest Thing that Almost Happened in September 2009. The rest of Don Robertson's books are currently out of print. In 2016 the Italian editor Nicola Manuppelli started the Italian publication of Robertson's works with the publisher Nutrimenti, translating "The Ideal, Genuine Man" (Nutrimenti, 2016). A second novel by Robertson, "Praise the Human Season" will be translated by Nicola Manuppelli at the end of 2017.. In 2019, Nicola Manuppelli edited and translated an unpublished Don's novel "Julie" in Italy for Nutrimenti publisher. The novel is about the character Julie Sutton, known from others Don's works.

== Awards ==
A Flag Full of Stars (1964), set during the 1948 election of Harry Truman, won the Putnam Award. Robertson won the Cleveland Arts Prize for his Morris Bird books, in 1966. He won the Ohioana Book Award in fiction in 1988 for The Ideal, Genuine Man.The Society for the Study of Midwestern Literature presented him with its Mark Twain Award in 1991. The Press Club of Cleveland's Hall of Fame inducted Robertson in 1992, and he received the Society of Professional Journalist's Life Achievement Award in 1995.

== Critical reception and legacy ==
After Robertson published his first novel, The Three Days, he was criticized by President Dwight Eisenhower for the obscene language used by the soldiers in the story. Reviewers compared Robertson's first three books - the Civil War trilogy (1959-1962) - to the works of Mark Twain, Booth Tarkington, and J.D. Salinger. The Dictionary of Midwestern Literature pronounced it Robertson's "most significant fictional accomplishment" and predicted the three-book saga was "likely to assume an important place in American boyhood fiction." In contrast, Robertson's later books were sometimes criticized for their violence and "sordid" tendencies.

Stephen King said Robertson's work had been an inspiration to him as a writer, and Robertson was deeply touched when King published "the older writer's" novel, The Ideal, Genuine Man (1987). King also said, in a 2015 interview, that Robertson was "probably" his favorite novelist of all time.

Sportswriter Terry Pluto has said that, "Robertson made me believe I could become an author," after one of his high school teachers gave the 14 year-old Pluto a copy of The Greatest Thing Since Sliced Bread, and telling the young boy that he could write books too.

== Personal life and health ==
Dennis Dooley describes Robertson thusly: "A battler who fought his way back, with the help of his wife Sherri, from a series of crushing health problems—two heart attacks in 1974, several strokes, lung cancer and the eventual loss of both legs to diabetes—Robertson liked to refer to the nine novels he published after 1974 as his "posthumous" books." [...] "Wheelchair-bound (sic) but hard at work on another book (he relished a new software program that simulated the printed page), he told two departing fellow writers who had dropped by to see him shortly before his death, 'Hey, don’t forget me, you guys.'"

== Death ==
Robertson died at home of lung cancer on his birthday in 1999, aged 70. US Representative Dennis J. Kucinich gave a tribute to Robertson in front of Congress on April 14, 1999. He's buried at Oak Grove Cemetery in Logan, Ohio.

== Novels ==
- A Civil War Trilogy:
  - The Three Days (1959)
  - By Antietam Creek (1960)
  - The River and the Wilderness (published as Game Without Rules in the UK) (1962)
- A Flag Full of Stars (1964)
- The Greatest Thing Since Sliced Bread (1965)
- The Sum and Total of Now (1966)
- Paradise Falls (1968)
- The Greatest Thing That Almost Happened (1970)
- Praise the Human Season (1974)
- Miss Margaret Ridpath and the Dismantling of the Universe (1977)
- Make a Wish (1978)
- Mystical Union (1978)
- Victoria at Nine (1979)
- Harv (1985)
- The Forest of Arden (1986)
- The Ideal, Genuine Man (1987)
- Barb (1988)
- Prisoners of Twilight (1989)
