= East Ohio Gas =

American natural gas utility

- Industry: Public utility
- Founded: September 8, 1898
- Headquarters: Cleveland, Ohio
- Owner: Standard Oil Company (New Jersey) (1899–1943); Consolidated Natural Gas (1943–2000); Dominion Energy (2000–2024); Enbridge (2024–)
- Website: enbridgegas.com/ohio

The East Ohio Gas Company is an American natural gas public utility that has existed since 1898. The company was formed by Standard Oil and provided natural gas to cities in Ohio. East Ohio remained under the ownership of the Standard Oil Company (New Jersey) until 1942, when it was transferred to a new holding company called Consolidated Natural Gas. Consolidated was acquired in 2000 by Dominion Energy. In March 2024, Enbridge acquired East Ohio and two other natural gas companies from Dominion. Since the acquisition, the company has conducted business under the trade name Enbridge East Ohio.

== History ==
The company was incorporated on September 8, 1898 by the Standard Oil group to produce, transport, and market natural gas to cities in Ohio. In February 1910, East Ohio assumed the operations of the Cleveland Gas Light & Coke Company and the Peoples Gas Light Company, and concurrently, increased its capital to $20 million.

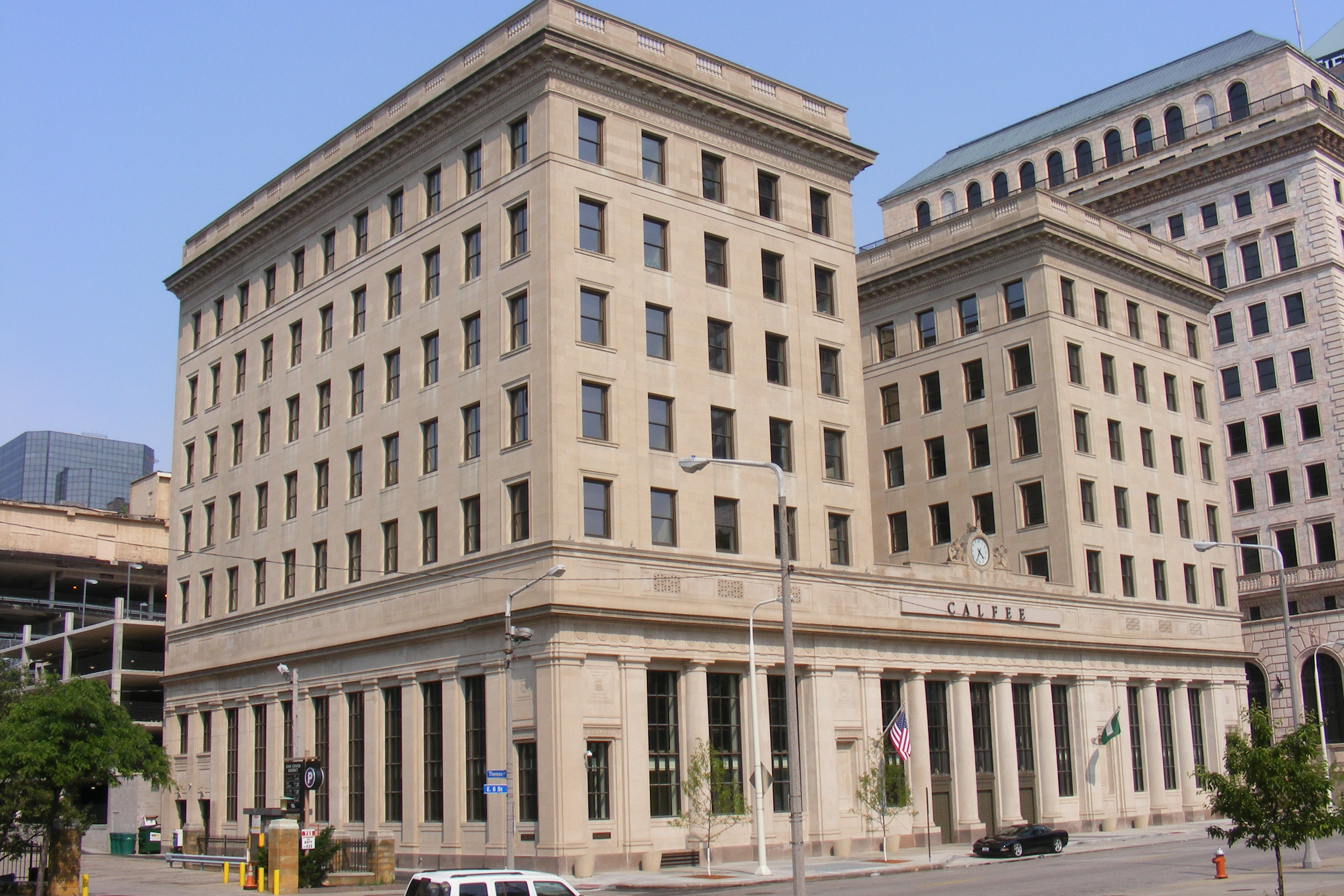
The new East Ohio Gas Building was built in 1915. It was designed by William Tubby.

Following the verdict of Standard Oil Co. of New Jersey v. United States in 1911, East Ohio Gas was one of the companies Jersey Standard retained ownership of during breakup of the latter's holdings.

On February 5, 1942, a decision of the Securities and Exchange Commission under the Public Utility Holding Company Act of 1935 required Jersey Standard to divest of several of its natural gas utilities. Consequently, Jersey formed the Consolidated Natural Gas Company and transferred to the new holding company the shares of East Ohio, the Hope Natural Gas Company, River Gas Company, Peoples Natural Gas Company, and New York State Natural Gas Company. Then, stock of the new holding company was transferred to Jersey shareholders.

The company's logo was designed by Lester Beall and Cliff Stead Jr..

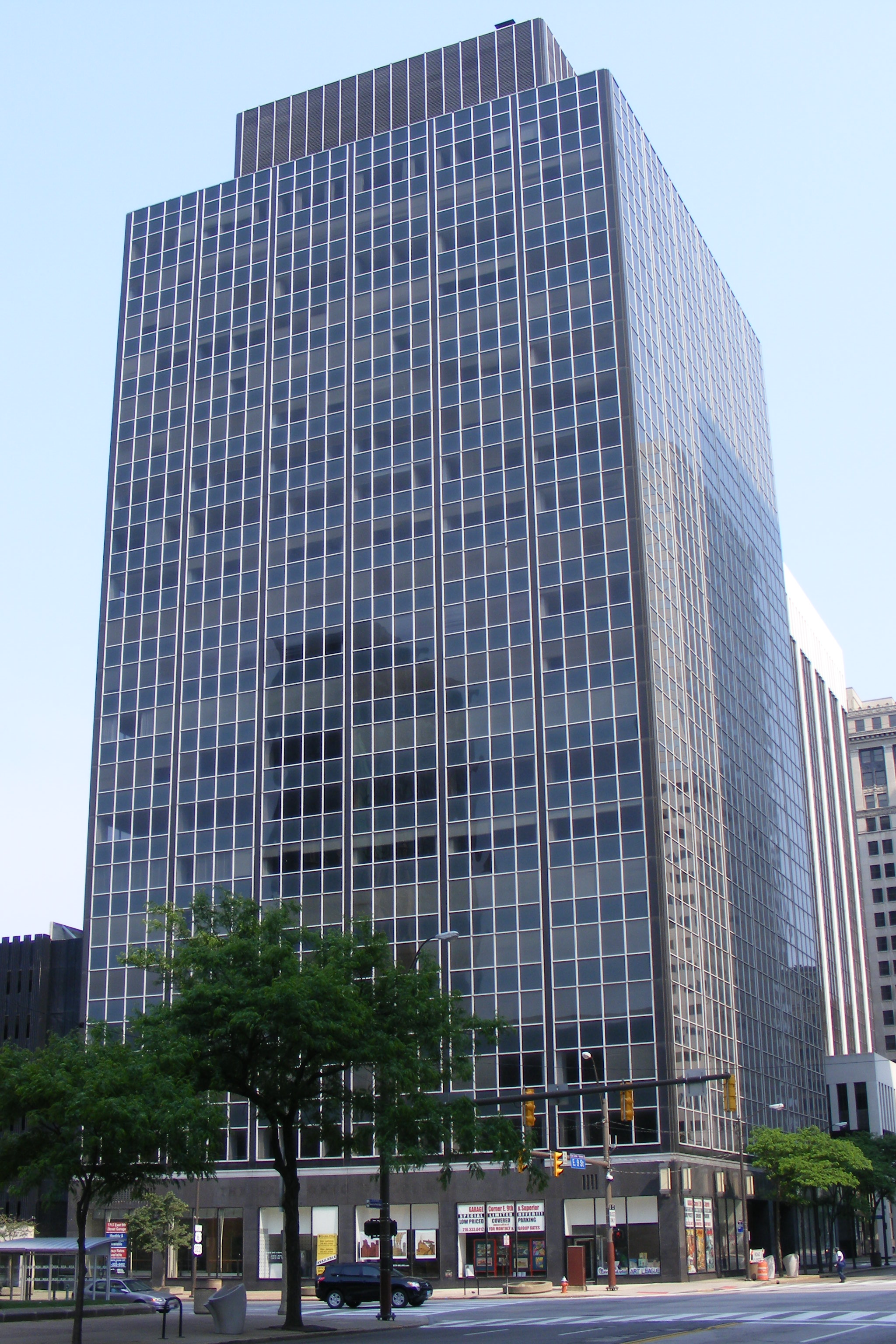
The East Ohio Building opened in April 1959. It was designed by Emery Roth & Sons.

In February 1999, Dominion Resources announced that it planned to acquired Consolidated Natural Gas for $6.3 billion. However, that April, the Columbia Energy Group made a $6.9 billion hostile offer for Consolidated. In May, Consolidated accepted a sweetened $6.3 billion offer from Dominion. The acquisition closed in January 2000.

On March 7, 2024, Enbridge acquired East Ohio, Questar Gas Company, and the Public Service Company of North Carolina from Dominion Energy for US$14 billion. Since that date, East Ohio Gas has operated as Enbridge East Ohio, though its legal name remains the same.

== Leadership ==
=== President ===
1. Elizur Strong, 1898–1906
2. Martin B. Daly, 1906–1926
3. Ralph W. Gallagher, 1926–1933
4. Charles E. Gallagher, 1933–1940
5. J French Robinson, 1940–1951
6. William G. Rogers, 1951–1957
7. Robert W. Ramsdell, 1957–1966
8. G. J. Tankersley, 1966–1973
9. Francis H. Wright, 1973–1975
10. Dudley J. Taw, 1975–1981
11. J. Richard Kelso, 1981–1988
12. Russell R. Gifford, 1988–1994
13. William F. Fritsche, 1994–1995
14. Tom D. Newland, 1995–

== Company histories ==
- A Century of Service Built on Trust: Celebrating 100 Years with East Ohio Gas. East Ohio Gas Company, 1998.
- Brignano, Mary and Hax McCullough. The Spirit of Progress: The Story of the East Ohio Gas Company and the People Who Made It. East Ohio Gas Company, 1988.
- East Ohio Gas Company. Fifty years of service, 1898–1948. East Ohio Gas Company, 1948.
- Kelso, J. Richard. The Spirit of Progress: The Story of the East Ohio Gas Company and the People Who Made It. Newcomen Society of the United States, 1988.

== See also ==
- Cleveland East Ohio Gas explosion
