= Environmental Action Germany =

Non-profit environmental and consumer protection association

- Deutsche Umwelthilfe e.V.
- Location: Hannover, Germany
- Secretary General: Jürgen Resch
- President (Vorsitzende): Margit Mönnecke
- Website: www.duh.de

Deutsche Umwelthilfe e.V. (DUH) (employing the English name Environmental Action Germany) is a non-profit environmental and consumer protection association, supported by public and private project grants and donations. It is a member of the European Environmental Bureau, in Brussels. It has the legal right to represent group claims in court against projects that it considers a threat to the environment. The group also aims to provide a forum for dialogue between environmental organizations, politicians and business people. The organisation, which is recognised as a non-profit organisation, is a consumer protection association with legal standing under the Injunction Act. It has the right to bring Verbandsklagen (class actions) under the Environmental Appeals Act and is entitled to bring Musterfeststellungsklagen (Model declaratory actions) or Abhilfeklagen (Redress actions). The DUH is registered in the Lobby Register in accordance with the Lobby Register Act. The association has offices in Berlin, Radolfzell and Hanover, as well as project offices in Köthen and Erfurt.

== History ==
The association was founded on 5 August 1975 simultaneously with the BUND regional association in Baden-Württemberg by Hermut Ruland, Gerhard Thielcke and Rudolf L. Schreiber. The original purpose of the association was to generate donations for the BUND, which, unlike other environmental associations, could also include funds from the private sector. In the first 13 years of its existence, the DUH focused on financing nature conservation projects and environmental education. At that time, its office was located in Öhningen (Baden-Württemberg). Initiated by DUH, the BUND and the NABU, the European Nature Heritage Foundation (Euronatur) was founded in 1987, the first European Environment Year, to support nature conservation projects throughout Europe. In 1988, the DUH moved into new offices in Radolfzell. At this time, the DUH expanded its environmental education activities, produced and distributed information brochures on nature conservation and environmental protection topics, carried out door-to-door and street collections to support several hundred mainly local nature conservation and environmental protection projects each year, launched the Jugend erlebt Natur (Youth experiences nature) campaign and thus developed into an independent association. In 1990, the DUH announced its first nationwide competition for municipal environmental protection. The first recipient of the award Bundeshauptstadt für Natur- und Umweltschutz (Federal Capital for Nature and Environmental Protection) was the city of Erlangen. The DUH's international Lake Constance environmental protection project led to the establishment of the Bodensee-Stiftung für Natur und Kultur (Lake Constance Foundation for Nature and Culture) in 1994. Its main focus was on promoting sustainable management, for example in the form of environmentally friendly tourism, biotope protection, resource-saving transport, organic farming and the protection of Lake Constance as a drinking water reservoir. In 1998, with the participation of the DUH, the international environmental foundation Global Nature Fund (GNF) was established, which is an international foundation dedicated to the preservation of water ecosystems. The GNF's largest project is the Living Lakes network, which has over 112 partners worldwide and around 60 lakes in 2021.

In 2004, the Federal Administrative Court recognised the DUH as a consumer protection association with the right to take legal action. In 2008, the Federal Environment Agency recognised the association as an association with the right to take legal action under the Environmental Appeals Act.

In 2023, the DUH and the Bund für Umwelt und Naturschutz (BUND) won a case against the German government before the Berlin-Brandenburg Higher Administrative Court. The subject of the proceedings was the lack of immediate programmes that would have been necessary in the areas of transport and buildings in accordance with the Climate Protection Act.

== Organisation and administration ==
=== Administration ===
The DUH is a registered non-profit association under German association law. In April 2025, it had 535 voting members and approximately 20,000 supporting members.

The association is divided into three regional associations (RV Nord based in Hanover, RV Ost based in Berlin and RV Süd based in Radolfzell). Their function is to pursue the goals and tasks of the DUH at the local and regional levels. The Executive Board sets the goals for their practical work and advises and supervises the work of the management. The federal chairmen of the Executive Board were Hermut Ruland from 1975 to 1988 and Gerhard Thielcke from 1988 to 2001. From 2001 until his death in early 2024, Harald Kächele held this office.

The delegates' meeting decides on the budget, approves the annual financial statements, and discharges and elects the Executive Board and the cash auditors.

The management is responsible for the operational business of the DUH. It is authorised to handle the economic, administrative and personnel matters of the federal office.The federal managing directors are Jürgen Resch (since 1987), Sascha Müller-Kraenner (since 2015) and, since 2022, Barbara Metz. Ulrike Voß and Matthias Walter have also been members of the federal management since 2022. Former managing directors were: Michael Spielmann (2012–2014), Rainer Baake (2006–2012) and Jörg Dürr-Pucher (1998–2006), Jürgen Rosemund (1988–1999) and Hans-Jürgen Dippel (1987–1988). As of the end of 2024, the main project work was carried out by 197 employees and 29 student assistants at four locations.

=== Memberships and partnerships ===
The DUH is a member of the alliance Atomausstieg selber machen (Do the nuclear phase-out yourself) and, from 1998 until 2022, a partner in the Hand-in-Hand-Fonds (Hand in Hand Fund) with Rapunzel Naturkost GmbH to promote social and ecological projects worldwide. The DUH also runs the Handys für die Umwelt (Mobile phones for the environment) initiative. It also coordinates door-to-door and street collections for the purpose of nature conservation and environmental protection. The alliance Kommunen für biologische Vielfalt (Municipalities for Biological Diversity) was largely founded by the DUH and is supported by it in establishing its own independent association. The DUH initiated the Lebendige Flüsse (Living Rivers) campaign in 1995. The association is also represented in the Mehrweg-Allianz (Reusable Alliance) and founded the Wild Cities project. The association coordinates the work of several networks and initiatives internationally. For example, it is responsible for the Rußfrei fürs Klima ('Black Carbon') campaign.

== Topics ==
=== Nature conservation and biodiversity ===
In its work on nature conservation and biodiversity, Deutsche Umwelthilfe focuses on four areas: Biological Diversity, Living Forests, Watercourse Protection and Marine Protection. Together with other associations, the DUH has been implementing measures to save endangered species and reconnect ecosystems since 1997 as part of the Living Rivers network. In a pilot project launched in 2014 on the Szczecin Lagoon, the DUH combined species protection with a support programme for structurally weak regions.

With the Living Elbe network, which the DUH runs together with the organisations NABU, BUND and WWF, it also pursues the goal of making the entire Elbe catchment area from the Czech Republic to the North Sea a World Natural and Cultural Heritage Site. Cross-border nature and species conservation programmes and projects such as the German-Czech youth exchange Die Sprachen des Flusses (The Languages of the River) contribute to European understanding. Between 2002 and 2005, the DUH initiated the International Elbe Bathing Day. The Living Forests project has been running since 2008, in which the association is committed to the preservation and restoration of intact and near-natural forests through model projects. In 2014, the association succeeded in getting UNESCO to recognise the Okavango Delta in Botswana, Africa, as a UNESCO World Heritage Site. Between 2012 and 2014, the DUH also worked with the Flussbüro Erfurt to rebuild bridges so that otters can pass underneath them safely. Until December 2013, the DUH also coordinated the work of OCEAN2012 in Germany. This Europe-wide alliance campaigned against overfishing in European seas and for a sustainable Common Fisheries Policy for the European Union.

=== Energy and climate protection ===
To promote a nature-friendly and socially just energy transition, the association coordinates specialist networks on the topics of energy transition, grid integration, heating, energy storage and bioenergy. It also holds information events in affected communities to promote greater acceptance of the energy transition through dialogue with residents and project developers.

Since 2008, Deutsche Umwelthilfe has organised and moderated the Forum Netzintegration Erneuerbare Energien (Renewable Energy Grid Integration Forum). The project, which was funded by the Federal Ministry for the Environment until 2014, brought together politicians and grid operators, conservationists and energy experts, scientists and citizens' initiatives to jointly develop measures for the successful conversion of the electricity grid. The first result was Plan N in 2010, a jointly developed policy paper with measures for the conversion and expansion of the electricity grids. At the end of 2013, the Forum Netzintegration Erneuerbare Energien published the follow-up paper, Plan N 2.0. The paper shows how the new infrastructure for a low-risk and sustainable energy supply can be designed in a way that is compatible with nature and society, thereby strengthening its regional acceptance. Almost 60 institutions, companies, organisations and associations involved in the discussion process signed Plan N 2.0, which was presented to politicians at a parliamentary evening in Berlin in January 2014. Another focus is the efficiency of buildings. By monitoring the market for the energy performance certificate, which has been mandatory in Germany since 1 May 2014, and taking legal action in the event of violations, the DUH aims to raise awareness of the environmental impact and financial costs of heating and provide information on the advantages of building renovation. According to the DUH, the energy-efficient renovation of buildings can be done socially acceptable.

The DUH criticised the study Kostentreiber für den Wohnungsbau (Cost drivers for housing construction) by the Arbeitsgemeinschaft für zeitgemäßes Bauen (Working Group for Contemporary Building), which claimed that energy efficiency jeopardises social housing; rather, the study's conclusions ignore the long-term savings in energy costs. Together with other environmental associations, the DUH supported a successful lawsuit brought by several children before the Federal Constitutional Court. In a ruling dated 24 March 2021, the inadequate legal regulations on climate protection were recognised as a violation of the complainants' fundamental rights, and parts of the Federal Climate Protection Act were declared unconstitutional. Since then, the DUH has filed further climate lawsuits against the federal government, state governments and companies.

=== Consumer protection ===
The association monitors compliance with environmental consumer protection regulations. It carries out random checks to verify the labelling requirements for products in retail outlets and monitors compliance with environmental and health-related product requirements. These include, for example, compliance with the maximum permissible mercury content in energy-saving light bulbs, the Car Energy Consumption Labelling Ordinance and compliance with emission regulations for combustion engines. The association has been registered in the list of qualified institutions under the Unterlassungsklagegesetz (Injunctive Relief Law) since 2004 and is therefore authorised to take appropriate action against violations of the Gesetz gegen den unlauteren Wettbewerb (Unfair Competition Law) and other consumer protection laws.

At the same time, the DUH criticises the German government for still not being able to ensure proper enforcement of the law through the market surveillance authorities. The DUH has already lodged several complaints with the EU Commission in this regard, including in 2016 together with the Bund für Umwelt und Naturschutz Deutschland (BUND).

Several nationwide campaigns to improve consumer protection were launched on the initiative of the DUH. The campaigns aim to inform and educate consumers and reduce health and financial burdens. The DUH wants to guide those affected so that they can improve their personal situation through their own behaviour.

=== Transport and air pollution control ===
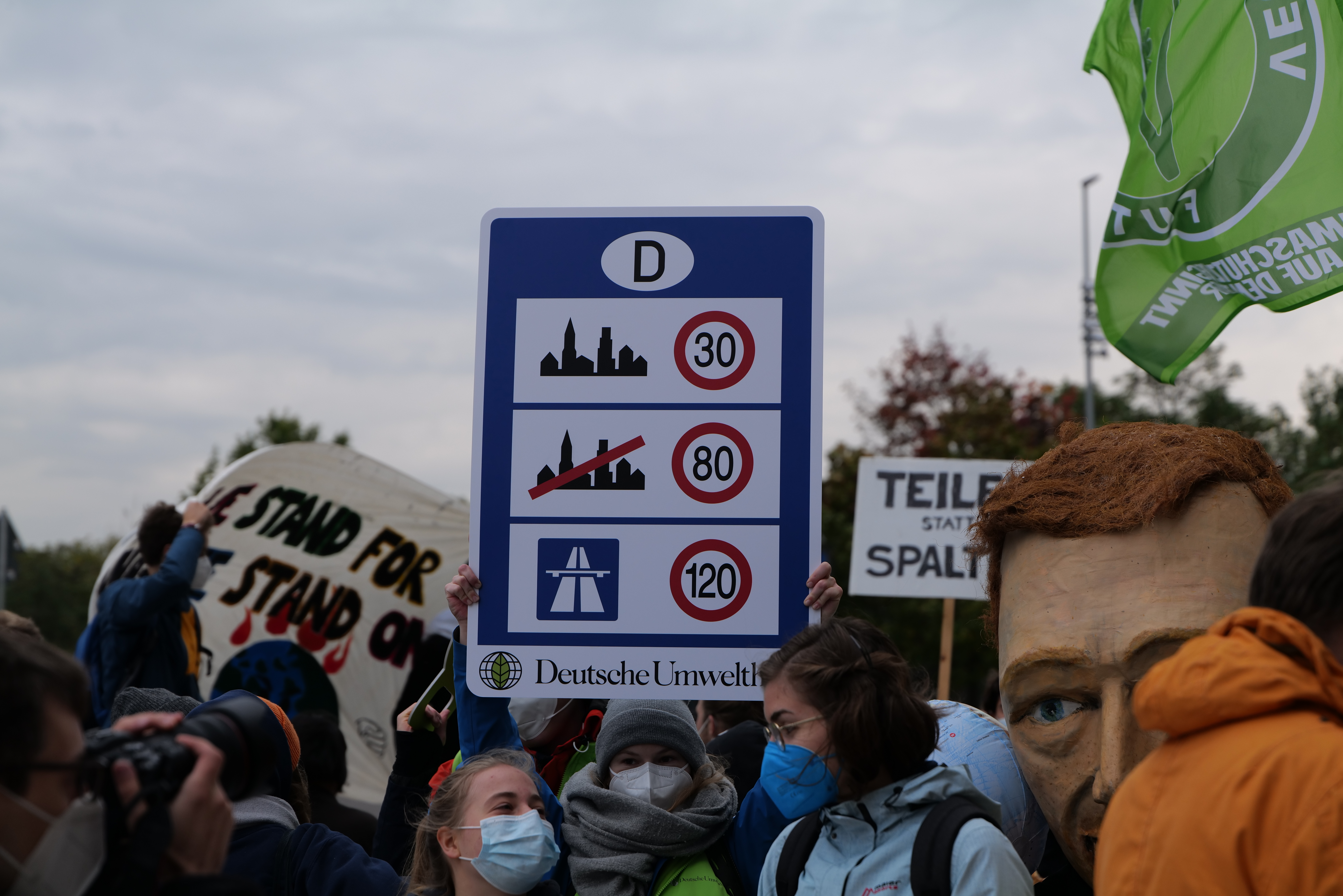
Poster calling for a 30 km/h speed limit in built-up areas during the exploratory talks following the 2021 German federal election

Since the mid-1990s, the association has been campaigning for a mobility transition. In the mid-1990s, the association campaigned for fuel-efficient cars and in 1998 launched a project for the early introduction of sulphur-free fuels, which were introduced in September 2001. The Blue Angel label for replacement catalytic converters was also introduced as a result of a DUH initiative. The association is also committed to reducing fuel consumption in passenger cars. Together with other non-governmental organisations, the DUH is fighting for stricter consumption limits and, at the same time, calling for checks on manufacturers' specifications for new vehicles.

In the European debate on more climate-friendly refrigerants for car air conditioning systems, the DUH contributed to the public discussion in 2008 with its own accident simulations and intensive public relations work on the dangers of the flammable and deadly refrigerant R1234yf. The German car manufacturer Daimler subsequently announced in 2012 that it would no longer use this substance.

In the context of the VW emissions scandal, the German Environmental Aid Association made serious allegations against Volkswagen and, on 23 October 2015, against Opel. A test by the DUH suggested that the German GM subsidiary had also cheated when measuring exhaust emissions. The DUH had an Opel Zafira with a diesel engine tested at the emissions testing centre of the Bern University of Applied Sciences (Switzerland) and measured nitrogen oxide (NOX) emissions that, depending on the measurement method, were up to 17 times higher than the valid Euro 6 limit value. Shortly afterwards, the Bern University of Applied Sciences distanced itself from the DUH's tests, claiming that they had not been carried out scientifically. TÜV Hessen repeated the DUH's emissions test and concluded that the emissions values were within the permissible range. Axel Friedrich, former head of department at the German Federal Environment Agency, is working as an expert for the DUH in this matter. The managing director of Deutsche Umwelthilfe, Jürgen Resch, described the emissions scandal as a 'failure of the state'. As the correspondence with the industry clearly shows, he said, there had been extremely close cooperation between the automotive industry and politicians. Civil society groups had provided evidence of fraud, but this had not been followed up with further measurements in Germany due to a lack of concrete evidence.

Since 2005, the association has been campaigning for compliance with EU air quality targets. It took legal action and secured a ruling from the European Court of Justice establishing an individually enforceable 'right to clean air'. This led to the establishment of environmental zones in many German cities. The Administrative Court of Düsseldorf, which was called upon by the DUH, concluded in September 2016 that in Düsseldorf 'driving bans for diesel vehicles must be addressed as soon as possible'. In the court's opinion, the legal means to do so already exist. On 28 July 2017, the DUH won a case against the state of Baden-Württemberg in the first instance before the Administrative Court of Stuttgart. The ruling was upheld by the Federal Administrative Court on 27 February 2018 after an appeal.

The DUH filed a lawsuit against the Senate Department for Environment, Transport and Climate Protection before the Administrative Court in Berlin. In order to improve air quality, the DUH wanted to obtain driving bans for older diesel vehicles within the Berlin S-Bahn ring and on several other roads. The ruling on the Berlin Clean Air Plan 2011–2017 was handed down on 9 October 2018. Berlin must implement diesel driving bans on at least eleven road sections by the end of June 2019. In February 2019, the city of Wiesbaden emerged from the lawsuit brought by Deutsche Umwelthilfe without a diesel driving ban. The city was able to present the court with a 49-point plan outlining how it would initiate a comprehensive transport revolution.

=== Circular economy ===
In 2002, the association, along with its business partners, played a key role in introducing the Container-deposit legislation on disposable bottles and beverage cans. The association is committed to reducing waste and ensuring that unavoidable waste is recycled or disposed of in an environmentally friendly manner. It seeks to promote the further development of a circular economy in Germany through the reuse of products and packaging (Mehrwegsysteme) and the closure of material cycles. Projects and campaigns such as Mehrweg ist Klimaschutz (Reusable is climate protection) and Einwegplastik kommt nicht in die Tüte (Single-use plastic doesn't belong in the bag) inform retailers and consumers about environmentally friendly packaging and climate-friendly reusable systems. With the Mehrweginnovationspreis (Reusable Innovation Award), the DUH creates an additional incentive for packaging companies to think ahead in terms of environmental protection. The association also regularly conducts inspections in DIY stores, electrical retailers and municipal waste disposal facilities to ensure that citizens can dispose of problematic waste, such as construction foam cans and energy-saving light bulbs, in an environmentally friendly manner. Together with Deutsche Telekom, the DUH has been running a collection scheme for old mobile phones for over ten years with the aim of ensuring that used devices are reused or recycled to a high standard. At European level, the DUH organises the ReUse-conference every three years. In September 2014, the association took part in the Berlin tüt was (Berlin does something) campaign organised by the Berlin Nature Conservation Foundation at Tempelhofer Feld in Berlin. More than 3,000 Berliners strung together a total of 30,000 plastic bags in the shape of a question mark to 'send a signal against the flood of plastic'. In doing so, they broke the existing world record of 4.2 kilometres.

=== Environmental education ===
To promote the sustainable use of natural resources, the DUH carries out intergenerational environmental education projects focusing on nutrition and biodiversity. These range from individual seminars for school classes to long-term cooperation with local partners. In projects such as Grüne Inseln für Alt und Jung (Green Islands for Old and Young), children work together with senior citizens to maintain wildflower meadows and create habitats for insects. Gärten für die Zukunft (Gardens for the Future) is a model project for sustainable lifestyles and was recognised in 2014 as a 'UN Decade Project for Education for Sustainable Development'.

=== Business activities within the framework of a limited liability company for the Federal Government ===
The DUH became part of a three-member consortium in the form of 'DUH Umweltschutz Service GmbH', which provides services for the Federal Ministry for Economic Affairs and Energy (BMWI). These services relate to communication in connection with the energy transition.

== Financing ==
The association is financed 38% by project grants, with roughly half coming from public sources and the other half from private donations. A further 30% of its income comes from consumer protection, for example, through cease and desist letters about incorrect product labelling, which is why the DUH is also referred to as a Abmahnverein (Cease and desist association). Donations, most of which come from companies and a smaller proportion from private donors, account for 17% of income. Toyota, for example, has supported the DUH since 1998 with a 'mid to high five-figure sum per year, which was used to support two projects'. Toyota discontinued this cooperation in January 2019. Sponsorship contributions, allocations from judicial authorities and contributions from sponsors and patrons also contribute to a lesser extent to income.

Since 2009, the DUH has received grants from the American ClimateWorks Foundation, the EU Commission and the German Federal Government as part of an EU-wide campaign to reduce soot. The DUH coordinated 13 participating associations.

In terms of expenditure, 76% of the financial resources were allocated to material costs and 24% to administrative costs, public relations and fundraising. The available funds were used for projects in the areas of general consumer protection and law (18%), transport policy (14%), transport and air pollution control (14%), municipal environmental protection (9%), energy and climate protection (7%), and recycling and reusable packaging (6%). Additional funds (12%) are used for project grants that the DUH awards to its partner organisations, thereby supplementing its own project work. The annual financial statements are audited by a certified auditor. The above information refers to the year 2016. The DUH publishes its financial figures in its annual reports and on its website.

The budget for 2022 was €14.4 million.

At the end of 2018, the German brewery Krombacher and the automotive group Daimler AG ended their cooperation with the DUH. Both companies emphasised that these decisions were not related to the controversial public debate at the time about driving bans for diesel vehicles.

== Awarding of environmental prizes ==
Every year, the association awards the Environmental Media Award. With this non-monetary award, the federal executive committee honours achievements in the categories of lifetime achievement, print, radio, online and film that deal with the preservation of natural resources. In 2019, the DUH awarded the negative prize Golden Vulture for the first time for the most 'senseless' product of the year from an ecological point of view. The first award went to the company Nestlé for its Vittel mineral water, which is packaged in multiple layers of plastic. In 2020, the award for the 'most ecologically nonsensical urban SUV' went to Daimler and the Mercedes-Benz GLS. In 2021, RWE received the award for 'the most brazen environmental lie of the year' for its statements on the share of renewable energies in its electricity mix. In 2023, McDonald's was awarded the negative prize for its 'I am beautiful' campaign.

With the Reusable Innovation Award, the DUH and the Stiftung Initiative Mehrweg (Reusable Initiative Foundation) recognise new developments in the field of environmentally friendly reusable systems. Particular attention is paid to the further development and dissemination of the reusable glass system.

== Notable work ==
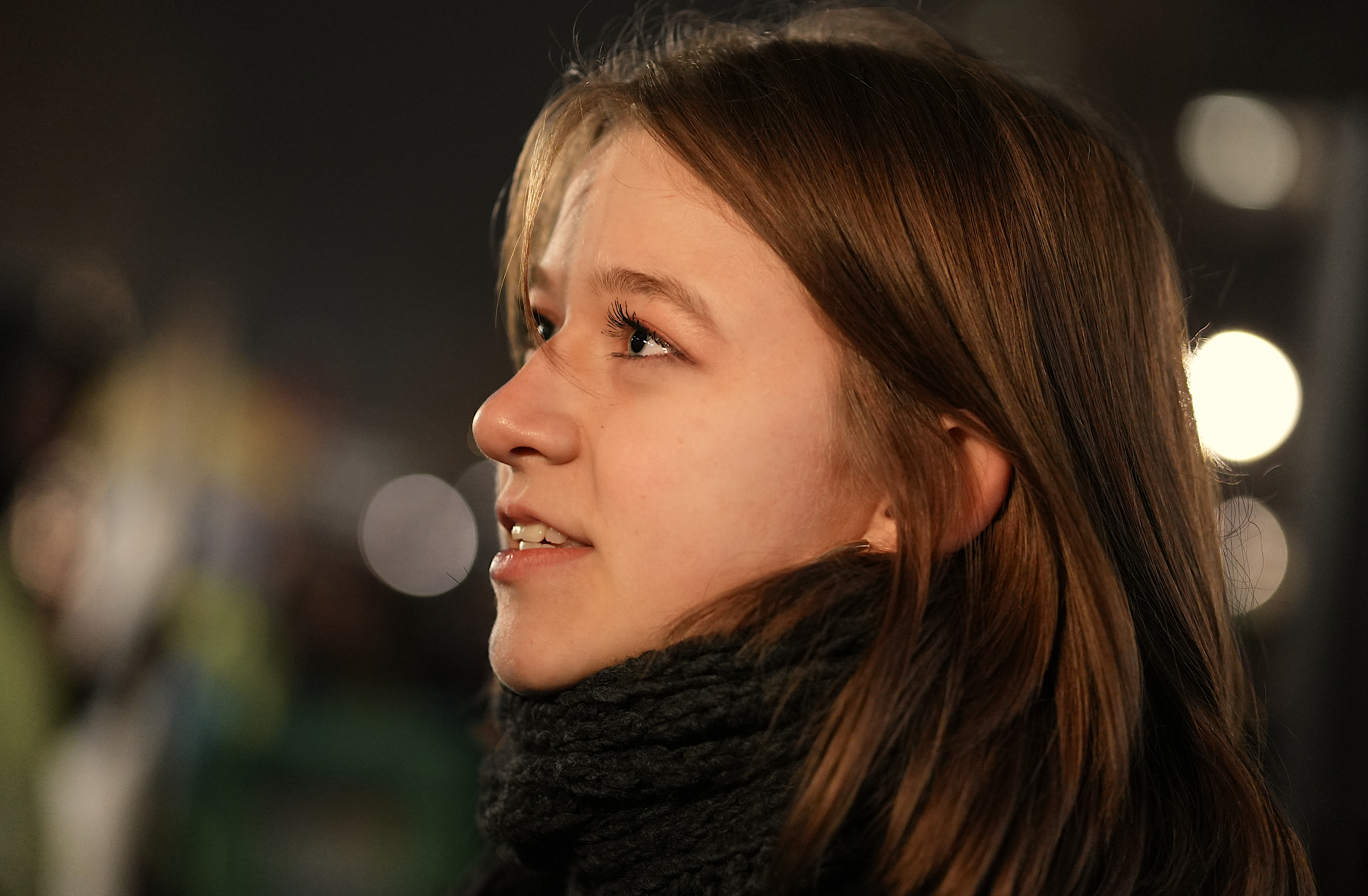
Frieda Egeling, the youngest of the 11 complainants in the KSG case, photographed in December 2024

In 2017, DUH filed a suit against Germany's Federal Motor Transport Authority (KBA), accusing it of failing to act robustly enough over Volkswagen's diesel emissions scandal.

In 2023, DUH lodged a complaint calling for the operating licence of the Floating Storage and Regasification Unit (FSRU) ship Höegh Esperanza at Wilhelmshaven LNG terminal to be shortened by a decade citing its discharging of chlorine and risks to Germany's climate targets.

In May 2024, the DUH launched legal action against the German federal government for failing to act sufficiently under the Climate Protection Act (Klimaschutzgesetz or KSG). There are 11 accompanying complainants, with the youngest being 14 years old at the time of filing. The court ruled that the federal government's climate protection programme did not provide for sufficient measures to guarantee that the climate targets would be met.

== Political pressure ==
At its party congress on 8 December 2018, Germans conservative party CDU decided to have the non-profit status of the DUH examined. The motion was tabled by Steffen Bilger, a member of Bundestag for CDU, who is also Parliamentary Under-Secretary of State in the Federal Ministry of Transport, as chairman of the CDU district association Nordwuerttemberg. The CDU also wants to ensure that the association no longer receives funds from the federal budget. The Federal Ministry for the Environment and the Federal Ministry of Economics subsequently declared that they would continue to promote the DUH. The responsible tax office in Singen stressed that it could only take action if there were concrete indications. In the ARD magazine Monitor, the lawyer Joachim Wieland commented on Bilger's stance against the DUH that the policy had long watched in connection with the violations of emission values and did not intervene out of consideration for the automotive industry. Now they are trying to steer the resulting anger away from politics and the automotive industry, towards the courts and the Environmental Action Germany.

== Critics ==
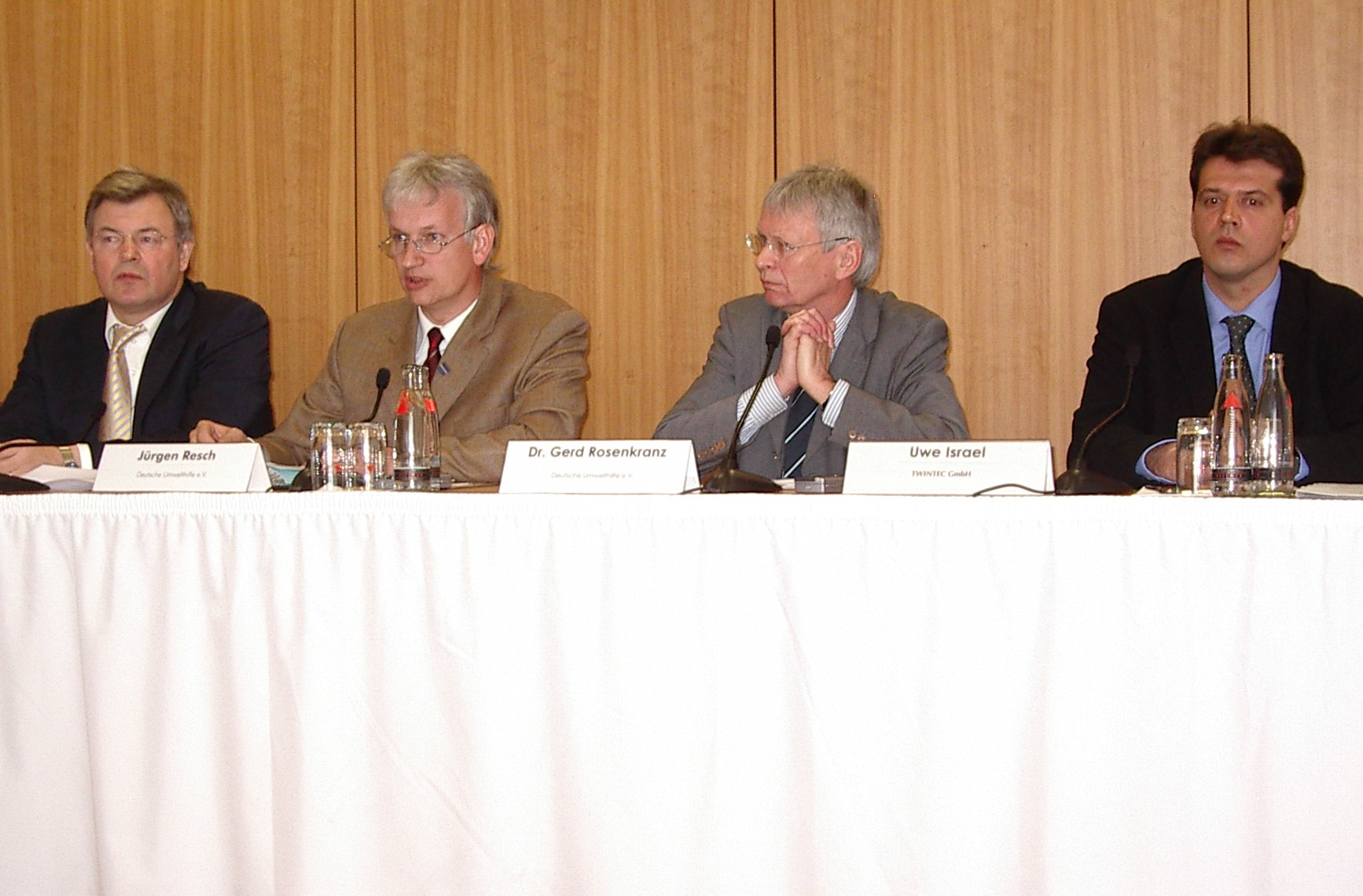
Jürgen Resch (2nd from left), Federal Managing Director of the DUH, 4 April 2005

=== Cease and desist practice ===
In March 2017, local newspaper Frankfurter Allgemeine Zeitung criticized the organization, calling it "an interest group financing by Cease and desist (Abmahnungen)“.

In 2010, the Konstanz Chamber of Crafts pointed out that the environmental organisation had sent cease and desist letters to car and household appliance dealers. The DUH carries out random market surveillance and, in its capacity as a consumer protection association with the right to take legal action, issues cease and desist letters to retailers and manufacturers who do not comply with their energy consumption labelling obligations, place energy-saving light bulbs with excessive mercury content on the market or provide incorrect or misleading information about electricity and fuel consumption or CO2 emissions.

In 2011, a chamber of the Hanover Regional Court described the DUH's demand for a contractual penalty payment in a specific case as an abuse of law.

In December 2018, North Rhine-Westphalia's Minister President Armin Laschet (CDU) stated that the DUH was a 'classic cease and desist association, financed by a foreign car manufacturer that wants to weaken the German car industry'. Back in March 2018, he had threatened to legally prohibit the Düsseldorf district government from imposing driving bans. The DUH then accused him of breaking the law and announced that it would enforce the ruling of the Düsseldorf Administrative Court on air pollution control. After the Ministry of the Environment declared that it would comply with the ruling of the Federal Administrative Court and the Düsseldorf district president declared that she had not received any instructions to that effect from the state government, the DUH withdrew its application for enforcement in March 2018.

On 25 April 2019, an appeal hearing began before the Federal Court of Justice against the DUH, which had issued a cease and desist to a Swabian car dealer for insufficient labelling of fuel consumption figures. Although the dealer had lost in the lower courts, the ruling allowed for an appeal in order to have the DUH's business model reviewed by the highest court.

On 4 July 2019, the Federal Court of Justice ruled that the DUH's cease and desist practice was compatible with applicable law.

In February 2024 Focus online reported, that the DUH had made an offer to the lobbying group "Erdgas Mobil" in December 2016 to promote Natural gas as fuel for vehicles as part of its campaign against the Diesel engine. In the proposal, signed by DUH boss Jürgen Resch, Environmental Action Germany offered to mobilize its network of partners and asked for 2.1 million euros for the campaign, but the offer was ultimately rejected by the lobbyists.

=== Industrial cooperation ===
In 2005, as part of its campaign to introduce diesel particulate filters, Kein Diesel ohne Filter (No diesel without filters), the DUH was criticised by the FDP for accepting donations from diesel soot filter manufacturers. On 4 April 2005, DUH Federal Executive Director Jürgen Resch admitted at a DUH press conference in Berlin that the DUH had collected over 100,000 euros from soot filter manufacturers. Since 2008, the Environmental Action Germany has supported model lawsuits brought by affected citizens in several cities, which have resulted in driving bans on diesel vehicles with high particle emissions. Since 2012, it has been able to pursue these lawsuits independently.

In February 2014, the DUH, together with two other institutions (Umweltbundesamt and RAL gGmbH), awarded the Blue Angel environmental label to Kat manufacturers LRT Automotive and HJS. In 2012, the DUH called on car parts dealers and repair shops to 'sell and install only Blue Angel catalytic converters or original parts.' The Frankfurter Allgemeine Zeitung criticised the more than 20 years of cooperation with Toyota and sees the DUH's actions against diesel vehicles as favouring Toyota models. This claim is contradicted by the fact that the DUH also tested a Toyota diesel and declared the excessive exhaust emissions to be illegal. According to information provided by Federal Managing Director Jürgen Resch on 1 March 2018 on the talk show Maybrit Illner, Toyota's funding amounted to between 30,000 and 70,000 euros per year, with an annual budget of around 8.3 million euros. This would correspond to only 0.6 to 0.8 per cent. Furthermore, according to its own statements, the DUH filed 47 lawsuits against Toyota for violations of consumer law. The connection to Toyota was also the focus of proceedings before the Federal Court of Justice (BGH). All lower courts and the BGH found no conflict of interest. Furthermore, it could not be determined that Toyota was excluded from the DUH's campaigns.

=== Failed efforts to revoke charitable status and end tax-funded support ===
At its party conference on 8 December 2018, the CDU decided to have the DUH's charitable status reviewed. The motion was tabled by CDU Member of Parliament Steffen Bilger, who was also Parliamentary State Secretary in the Federal Ministry of Transport, in his capacity as chairman of the CDU district association of North Württemberg. The CDU also wanted to ensure that the association would no longer receive funds from the federal budget.

The Federal Ministry for the Environment and the Federal Ministry of Economics subsequently declared that they would continue to support the DUH. The responsible tax office in Singen emphasised that it could only take action if there were concrete indications. On the ARD magazine programme Monitor, lawyer Joachim Wieland said of Bilger's stance against the DUH that politicians had long stood by and watched the violations of emission limits without intervening out of consideration for the automotive industry. Now, he said, attempts were being made to divert the resulting anger away from politicians and the automotive industry and towards the courts and the German Environmental Aid Association.

=== Applications for coercive detention ===
In the summer of 2019, the DUH filed applications for coercive detention for several politicians for up to six months if the administrative courts' rulings on driving bans were not implemented. In addition to leading politicians in the state government of Baden-Württemberg, Bavaria's Minister President Markus Söder was also the target of such an application. These applications were rejected in both federal states.
