= Speed limits in Germany =

A sign which shows the regular speed limits. This sign is typically posted at border crossings.

Speed limits in Germany (German: Geschwindigkeitsbegrenzung) are set by the federal government. All limits are multiples of 10 km/h. There are two default speed limits which are 50 km/h (31 mph) inside built-up areas and 100 km/h (62 mph) outside built-up areas.

While parts of the autobahns and many other freeway-style highways have posted limits up to 130 km/h (81 mph) based on accident experience, congestion and other factors, many rural sections have no general speed limit for some classes of vehicles. The Road Traffic Regulations (StVO) (German: Straßenverkehrs-Ordnung) section on speed begins with the requirement which may be rendered in English:

Any person driving a vehicle may only drive so fast that the car is under control. Speeds must be adapted to the road, traffic, visibility and weather conditions as well as the personal skills and characteristics of the vehicle and load.

This requirement applies to all roads, and is similar to the "reasonable speed" legal obligation levied in other nations.

Speed limits are enforced with a small tolerance. In urban areas, driving merely 3 km/h (2 mph) or faster above the posted or implied speed limit is considered a punishable infraction in Germany. If the speed limit is 100 km/h (62 mph) or more, the tolerance is 3%. Other tolerances may apply for mobile speed cameras and undercover police cars. The speeding fines are set by federal law (German: Bußgeldkatalog, schedule of fines).

== History ==
The Nazi-era Road Traffic Act of 28 May 1934 imposed the first nationwide speed limit: 60 km/h (37 mph) maximum in urban areas, but no limit on rural highways or autobahns. In October 1939, the Nazis further throttled speeds in order to conserve fuel: 40 km/h (25 mph) in urban areas, 80 km/h (50 mph) elsewhere. After the war, the four Allied occupation zones established their own speed limits until the divided East German and West German republics were constituted in 1949; initially, the Nazi speed limits were restored in both East and West Germany.

In December 1952 the West German legislature voted to abolish all speed limits, reverting to State-level decisions. However, rising traffic fatalities led to a partial reversal: an urban speed limit of 50 km/h (31 mph) became effective 1 September 1957, despite resistance by the German Auto Club. By 1970, fatalities had climbed to over 19,000; in 1972 a general rural speed limit of 100 km/h (62 mph) went into effect—except on motorways. At 14 November 1983 the Hamburg suburb of Buxtehude had the first implementation of 30 km/h (19 mph) limits in residential areas, a concept that became popular.

East Germany's safety efforts primarily focused on restrictive traffic regulation; for example, zero alcohol tolerance, 100 km/h (62 mph) on autobahns and 80 km/h (50 mph) outside cities. Within two years after German reunification in 1990, the availability of high-powered vehicles and a 54% increase in motorized traffic led to a doubling of annual traffic deaths, despite interim continuation of prior speed restrictions. An extensive program of the four Es (enforcement, education, engineering, and emergency response) brought the number of traffic deaths back to pre-unification levels after ten years while traffic regulations were conformed to western standards (e.g. 130 km/h (81 mph) Autobahn advisory limit, 100 km/h (62 mph) on other rural roads, and 0.5 milligrams BAC).

== Autobahns ==
As far as quasi-religious national obsessions go for large portions of a country's population, the German aversion to speed limits on the autobahn is up there with gun control in America and whaling in Japan.

— Katrin Bennhold, The New York Times

Traffic sign indicating end of all restrictions (including speed limits). In addition, this is always set on rural part of a road which requests drivers to drive the default speed limit 100 km/h, if not specially noted.

German autobahns are famous for having no speed limit, although there are about 30% of them which the temporary or permanent limit is valid. Roughly 21% of German motorways have static limits (temporary or permanent) indicated by traditional traffic signs. An additional 9% are equipped with motorway control systems that can show variable speed limits depending on time, weather or traffic. Most of these are switched off (= no limit) under good conditions. In sections of the motorway system without speed limit it is possible to be overtaken by cars or motorcycles travelling over 200 km/h (125 mph). However, a recommended speed limit (Richtgeschwindigkeit) of 130 km/h (81 mph) applies. While driving at higher speeds is not punishable, the increased risk induced by higher speeds (erhöhte Betriebsgefahr) may result in partial liability for damages. Moreover, the law forbids travel at speeds that would extend the vehicle's minimum halting distance beyond the driver's line of sight (Sicherheitsabstand). On all German roads, there are speed limits for trucks, buses, cars towing trailers, and small motorised vehicles (mopeds, etc.).

"Free travel for free citizens! (Freie Fahrt für freie Bürger!)" is a popular phrase in Germany, coined by the ADAC in its resistance to a general speed limit on the Autobahn.

=== Public opinion ===
==== Surveys and associations ====
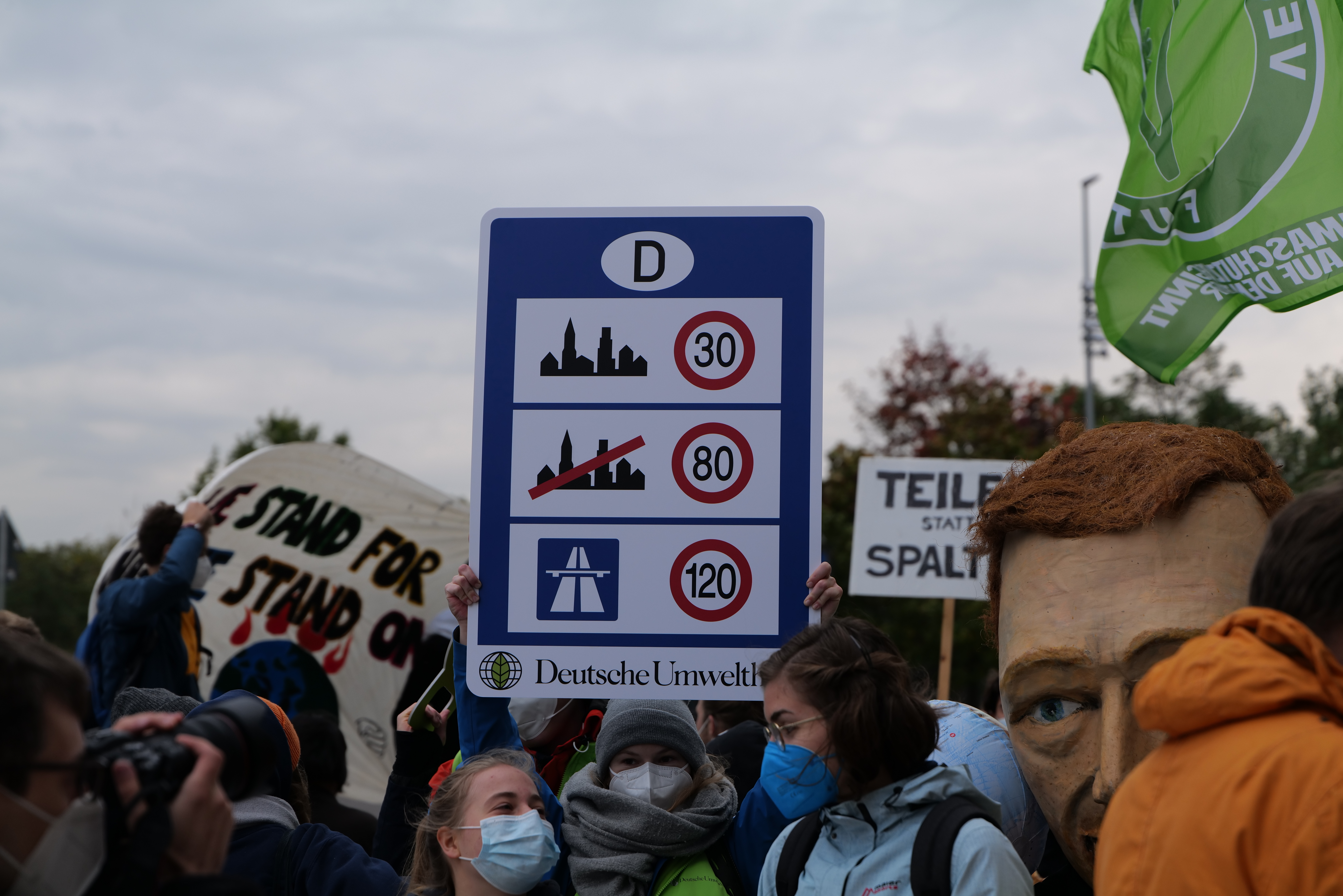
Demand poster of the Deutsche Umwelthilfe on staggered speed limits during exploratory talks after the 2021 federal election

Because of the lack of a continuous speed limit and low fines, Germany has sometimes been called a "speeders' paradise" by the press and media.

The introduction of a national speed limit for motorways and similar roads has been on the agenda of various political and environmentalist groups for decades, but at present, there are no plans on behalf of the federal government regarding the matter. However, most Germans are in favour of a general speed limit.

In May 2020, the Deutscher Verkehrssicherheitsrat made a tight decision in favor of a general speed limit of 130 kilometers per hour on autobahns.

The annual general meeting of the Auto Club Europa (ACE) also voted for a speed limit of 130 km/h on the autobahn in November 2019. The ACE chairman Stefan Heimlich welcomed the decision of the DVR and described it as "richtig und wichtig" ("right and important").

The Verkehrsclub Deutschland e. V. (VCD) advocates the introduction of a generally applicable maximum speed of 120 kilometers per hour on autobahns and expects this measure to provide more climate protection, higher traffic safety, fewer traffic jams due to lower speed differences and better efficiency for new vehicles, since a speed limit would end "das [...] Wettrüsten um immer schnellere Autos [...]" ("the [ ...] arms race for ever faster cars [...]").

Greenpeace calls for a general speed limit on German highways, arguing that it would prevent traffic fatalities and protect the environment, that the majority of Germans are in favor of it, and that it would spur the construction of fuel-efficient cars. A general speed limit is "the fastest and cheapest measure to reduce greenhouse gases in the transport sector."

The nature conservation association WWF calls for a speed limit of 120 kilometers per hour on motorways.

In 2005, the Sachverständigenrat für Umweltfragen (SRU) proposed a speed limit of 120 kilometers per hour on the autobahn.

The Wuppertal Institute for Climate, Environment and Energy also advocates the introduction of a speed limit on German highways.

The Deutsche Umwelthilfe is calling for a general speed limit of 100 km/h during the day and 120 km/h at night on autobahns, hoping that this will lead to greater climate protection and traffic safety, a better flow of traffic, a more relaxed driving situation and a redirection from building faster cars to more efficient ones.

The Bund für Umwelt und Naturschutz Deutschland is in favour of a general speed limit, claiming it "would solve several problems at the same time" and "all rational reasons speak for it".

The Gewerkschaft der Polizei also advocates a general speed limit of 130 kilometers per hour on German motorways and argued: "Wir könnten [damit] Menschenleben retten und schwer Verletzte verhindern" ("We could save lives and prevent seriously injured people [with that]").

In 2021, the Umweltbundesamt advocated the introduction of a speed limit on freeways of 120 kilometers per hour.

The Deutscher Ärztetag called for a maximum speed limit of 130 km/h on highways in 2021.

The Evangelical Church in Central Germany (EKM) submitted a petition to the Bundestag in 2019 for the introduction of a general speed limit of 130 kilometers per hour on motorways in Germany. With this measure, the EKM expects, among other things, more environmental protection and traffic safety.

The Bayerische Landesärztekammer calls for the introduction of a speed limit to save energy and reduce direct and indirect health hazards of road traffic.

In 2023, the Deutsche Verkehrswacht (DVW) called for the introduction of a speed limit on German highways of 130 km/h. According to the DVW president, this could effectively prevent serious accidents.

According to a club-internal survey, 39% of ADAC members were against a general speed limit in 2026, while 56% were in favor of it.

In a representative survey conducted by the German online statistics portal Statista in 2020, 64% of the 2,115 respondents said that a 130 km/h speed limit should either "definitely" or "rather" be introduced on German highways.

According to a 2021 survey conducted by the Versicherung Allianz Direct, around 71% of Germans are in favour of a speed limit on the autobahn.

According to a representative poll conducted by YouGov in April 2022, 57% of the 2054 German respondents were in favor of a general speed limit of 130 km/h on autobahns, while 33% were against it and 10% were unsure.

As part of its "TÜV Mobility Study 2022", the German Technical Inspection Agency (TÜV) asked various questions about the topic of automobiles in Germany. According to the study, 56% of Germans are in favor of a 130 km/h speed limit on the autobahn, while 37% are opposed to the measure.

==== Politics ====
A majority of the CDU/CSU, SPD, AfD and FDP parliamentary groups rejected a general speed limit of 130 km/h on the autobahn in the 2019 Bundestag, the parliamentary groups from Bündnis 90/Die Grünen and the Left Party voted in favor of it. Overall, 70% of MPs voted against the speed limit, 18% in favor, 1% abstained and 11% did not take part in the vote. The SPD parliamentary group declared that it only voted against the speed limit because it did not succeed in convincing its coalition partner CDU/CSU parliamentary group of this.

In 2020, the Bundesrat rejected a speed limit on autobahns, which was requested by its environmental committee.

=== Arguments ===
The news website Business Insider believes the lack of a general speed limit on autobahns is holding back the development of autonomous vehicles in Germany. For example, the massive differences in speed among road users on autobahns pose a problem for self-driving cars.

The Federal Managing Director of the Deutsche Umwelthilfe Jürgen Resch sees this as a threat to the future of the German automotive industry with regard to autonomous driving: "Man kann moderne, digitale, autonome Fahrzeuge nicht testen, solange man befürchten muss, dass links ein Wagen mit 250 Stundenkilometern vorbeischießt." ("You cannot test modern, digital, autonomous vehicles as long as you have to fear that a car will shoot past at 250 kilometers per hour on the left.")

In terms of range and energy efficiency, drivers of electric cars need a stable flow of traffic that rarely requires braking and then accelerating, which is beneficial or even necessary to ensure a long-term return on investment. Such a traffic flow could be achieved with the help of a speed limit through more even speeds.

A study from Brandenburg came to the conclusion that a speed limit on autobahns could harmonize the flow of traffic and increase the road capacity. Furthermore, if a speed limit of 130 km/h were introduced on previously unrestricted sections of the Brandenburg autobahns, the reduction in accident costs (€22.5 million) would be higher than the increase in time costs (€17.2 million) that occur at lower speeds due to longer travel times.

Many congestion and traffic researchers believe that with a speed limit, traffic flow would improve due to smaller speed differentials and accompanying more consistent travel speeds, which would increase road capacity and reduce the risk of accidents and congestion. Some experts therefore even assume that with a speed limit, the average speed on autobahns could increase.

Michael Müller-Görnert, transport policy spokesman for the VCD, assumes that travel times could be shorter in the long term if a speed limit is introduced.

According to Professor Stefan Bauernschuster, Chair of Public Economics at the University of Passau, a speed limit would save time for all truck drivers as well as the up to 70% of drivers who do not drive much faster than 130 km/h, even on unlimited autobahns, because the lower probability and severity of accidents would result in fewer accident-related traffic jams and closures. Only those drivers who drive significantly faster than the recommended speed of 130 km/h would lose time as a result of the introduction of a speed limit.

Also, according to the results of a study on the effects of a speed limit from Brandenburg, the introduction of a speed limit on highways has the potential to reduce travel times for all road users due to the harmonization of speeds and the associated reduced risk of congestion. In addition, the study concluded that one lane on highways with a speed limit can accommodate about 100 more cars per hour compared to one on unlimited highways.

A speed limit could also reduce CO_{2} emissions. A general speed limit on autobahns is considered to be a quickly implementable, cost-effective, realistic, and effective measure for some people.

Tire abrasion caused by fast driving and frequent braking and acceleration, which leads to particulate matter, could also be reduced by a speed limit. The overall need for tires and thus also for natural rubber could also be reduced due to the lower wear.

Professors Stefan Bauernschuster and Christian Traxler, from the Hertie School, argue in a 2021 study paper that since emissions of pollutants increase disproportionately at high speeds, a speed limit could be beneficial to health by reducing air pollution. Using small-scale geographic grid data from RWI Essen, they show that 14.9 million people in Germany live within two kilometers of the nearest stretch of highway without a speed limit. These values indicate that a significant portion of the population could benefit directly from the reduction in emissions associated with a speed limit.

Furthermore, a speed limit would reduce noise pollution.

In addition, production costs and thus the final costs of cars could be reduced if they no longer had to be designed for high speeds.

A speed limit could also reduce land consumption for the routing of highways and thus the costs for new construction, expansion and maintenance.

An often cited argument for a general speed limit is also that it would reduce the number of road accidents. (For further information about safety figures on speed-limited and unlimited autobahns, see Autobahn#Safety.)

Some traffic researchers, such as Harald Kipke, expect the introduction of a general speed limit on autobahns to also improve safety on rural roads, because after a fast highway trip, the maximum speed of 100 km/h feels particularly slow on rural roads, making it harder for drivers to judge speeds and dangers there.

According to a study published in 2023, which determined the effects of a speed limit on travel times, accident and congestion risk, fuel consumption, supply chains, expansion and maintenance of infrastructure and land use, and emissions of air pollutants and greenhouse gases as part of a cost-benefit analysis, the introduction of a 130 km/h speed limit on German autobahns would generate a welfare gain of at least 950 million euros per year. According to its own statements, the study was based exclusively on publicly available data.

=== History ===
After the Nazi dictatorship, German society was happy to overcome the traumas of war by freeing itself from most government restrictions and regulations, including a general speed limit on autobahns.

In the wake of the 1973 oil crisis, a federal speed limit of 100 km/h (62 mph) on Autobahns was imposed to help save fuel and mitigate impending future shortages. Environmental or safety concerns were not considered at the time. The measure only lasted from December 1973 to March 1974; while the Schmidt administration and the Bundestag were in favor of keeping the speed limit, the Bundesrat successfully pushed to repeal the law in early 1974. As a compromise, a non-binding advisory speed limit (Empfohlene Richtgeschwindigkeit) was later introduced in 1978 on Autobahns and "highways outside of built-up areas with a center divide or without a centre divide and a continuous lane for overtaking in both directions".

In February 1974 - three months after the peak of the oil crisis with the four car-free Sundays in Germany - the General German Automobile Club (ADAC) under its president Franz Stadler launched a campaign entitled "Free citizens demand free travel (Freie Bürger fordern freie Fahrt)", which was mainly directed against the four-month large-scale 100 km/h trial on federal motorways that had started in November 1973. The following entry can be found in the ADAC chronicle:

"1974: The ADAC criticizes the large-scale 100 km/h test on motorways. The 'Motorwelt' announces that the club will do everything to prevent the 'unrealistic crawling speed'. The ADAC, on the other hand, has become more friendly with 100 km/h on country roads."

As a kind of gentlemen's agreement between the German government and the country's car industry, German automakers then limited their high-performance cars to a top speed of 250 km/h (155 mph), a rule that is still adhered to today for standard production cars. The 1978 law is basically still in effect today, although unrestricted non-Autobahn highways have since become virtually non-existent.

In contrast to the idea of being non-binding, a 1992 decision by Germany's Federal Court of Justice stated that the advisory speed limit must be observed, and that a motorist causing an accident at higher speeds cannot claim unforeseeable events as a defense. While this ruling had implications for the liability for accidents above 130 km/h, the advisory speed limit still today is not a mandatory top speed as such for travel on stretches of unrestricted Autobahn, and exceeding it is not illegal.

The Umweltbundesamt (Federal Environmental Agency) repeated its recommendation of a binding blanket speed limit in early 2007, but the Merkel administration saw no need for it. A 2007 party convention held by the SPD resulted in the addition of a call for an Autobahn speed limit to the party's platform, against resistance within the SPD's own ranks. Although the SPD was in a government coalition with Angela Merkel's CDU at the time, the administration officially rejected the proposal.

Even without a blanket speed limit, state and even local authorities have the power to restrict speeds. The district of Cologne has posted a speed limit on the heavily frequented Kölner Autobahnring / (Cologne Beltway). Effective 9 April 2008, the City-State of Bremen enacted a 120 km/h (75 mph) speed limit as state law, citing environmental concerns. Most Bremen motorways already had some speed restriction due to congestion and noise, and the new measure only affected 11 km (6.8 miles) of previously unrestricted Autobahn. Furthermore, in July 2023 the city council of Essen decided to reduce the speed limit of its city crossing highway A40 from 80 to 60 km/h, in an effort to reduce the city's air pollution, which had been found to have high nitric oxide (NO_{x}) levels.

After over a decade of almost complete absence from political discourse, the issue of imposing a blanket maximum speed limit on German Autobahns was readdressed by a German federal government committee on the future of mobility and emission reduction in January 2019. In its first preliminary report, the committee recommended higher fuel prices and the introduction of an Autobahn speed limit among other measures. German transport minister Andreas Scheuer collectively called the plans laid out in the report as "gegen jeden Menschenverstand" ("going against all common sense"). Merkel cabinet speaker Steffen Seibert subsequently clarified that there were no plans for a general speed limit.

=== Minimum speed ===
Minimum speeds are very rarely marked in Germany. In 2017, the signs were removed from the Road Traffic Regulations (StVO), hence stopping the production of new signs. Previously existing signs remain valid but are slowly being removed.

=== Advisory speed ===
The nationwide advisory speed limit (Richtgeschwindigkeit) in Germany is 130 km/h since 1978.

This advisory speed limit is taken into account by the case law. For instance someone who exceeds the target speed by about 60 percent, for no other reason than reaching home earlier, forgoes any capacity to avoid an accident. A speed of 200 kilometres per hour makes it impossible to quickly avoid dangerous situations while compliance with 130 km/h and only moderate braking would have prevented the accident.

=== Maximum speed limit ===
Some classes of vehicle have specific speed limit, such as trucks.

== Other roads ==
Rural roads, except for motorways or other designated fast roads, have a speed limit of 100 km/h, which is routinely reduced to 70 km/h or 80 km/h where the road approaches a junction with a significant side-road. Tree-lined scenic routes, such as the German Avenue Road, often have 70 km/h limits. Lorries, some buses, and cars towing trailers have lower speed limits as well.

In 2015, the German Safety Council recommended that the general limit is set at 80 km/h for rural roads narrower than 6 m. The proposed speed would reduce the differential with trucks 3.5 tonne lorries, which generally travel at 60 km/h. In 2013, rural roads spanned approximately 200,000 km, with at least 1,934 deaths on them.

Town sign indicating the start of an urban area with a limit of 50 km/h

30 km/h zone limit, often found in residential areas

=== City limits ===
There is a general speed limit within built up areas, which are marked by distinctive rectangular yellow signs showing the name of the village, town or city, of 50 km/h but residential areas usually have a lower posted speed limit of 30 km/h. A pattern is starting to arise in cities, lowering their speed limit to 40 km/h in an effort to reduce (noise) pollution. On arterial roads, the speed limit may be raised to 60 or 70 km/h; this higher speed limit will be posted in the usual way. Motorways crossing cities count as normal autobahns and can be used for travel within larger cities in many cases.

== Truck speed limits ==
There is a general speed limit of 80 km/h (50 mph) for trucks with a GVWR over 3,500 kg (7,716 lbs) and for vehicles with trailers. For vehicles with a GVWR of over 7,500 kg (16,534 lbs) the limit is set to 60 km/h (37 mph) except on autobahns (also 80 km/h). For coaches and cars with trailers the limit is increased to 100 km/h on autobahns (under certain requirements). Posted speed signs for trucks are not common, they can be seen on some dangerous curves or descents.

Trucks over 3,500 kg are required to have a built-in speed limiter for a maximum speed of 90 km/h (56 mph), and buses for a maximum speed of 100 km/h (62 mph). There are a few exceptions for army, police, fire brigade or scientific purposes.
