= Grüner Strom Label =

The Gruener Strom Label Association
- Grüner Strom Label e.V.
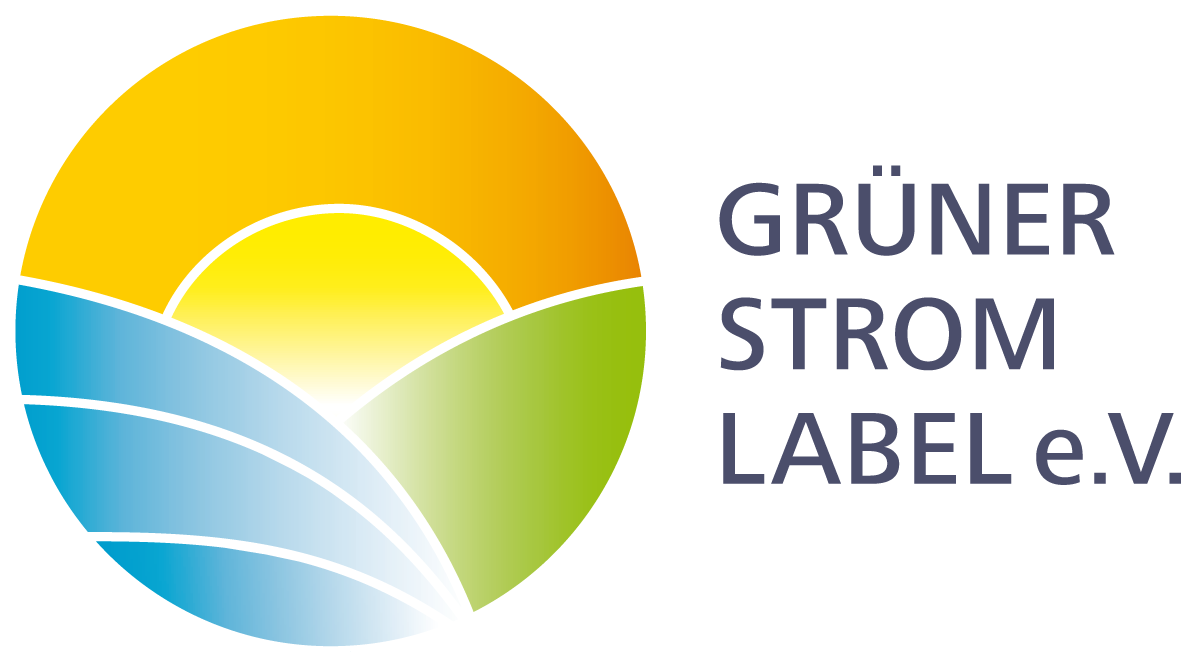
- Formation: 1998
- Purpose: Certifying green energy sources or production
- Headquarters: Kaiserstraße 113, 53113 Bonn
- Chair: Daniel Craffonara
- Board of directors: Dietmar Oeliger, NABU (Stellvertreter: Marcus Bollmann, BUND)
- Website: https://gruenerstromlabel.de/en/

The Gruener Strom Label association (the “Grüner Strom Label e.V." or "GSL e.V.“) certifies green energy sources or production. The Bonn based association was founded at the initiative of EUROSOLAR in December 1998. The GSL e.V. issues two seals of approval – one, named Grüner Strom, introduced in 1999, is granted for green electricity, and the other, named Grünes Gas, introduced in 2013, is granted for biogas. By 1999, Grüner Strom was the first certification for electricity from green power sources in Germany.Grüner Strom and Grünes Gas are the only seals of approval in Germany, indicating endorsement by leading environmental organizations. The goal of products recommended by certification is to increase transparency in the green electricity and biogas markets and to advance ecologically sustainable energy supply.

== Supporters ==
The Grüner Strom Label e. V. indicates support and endorsement by the following organizations:

- EUROSOLAR (The European Association for Renewable Energy)
- Bund für Umwelt und Naturschutz Deutschland (BUND) (German League for Environment and Nature Protection)
- Naturschutzbund Deutschland (NABU) (German Nature Protection League)
- Deutscher Naturschutzring (DNR) (German League for Nature, Animal and Environment Protection)
- International Physicians for the Prevention of Nuclear War (IPPNW German Affiliate)
- Die Verbraucher Initiative (The Consumers Initiative Association for consumer information, focusing onenvironmental, health and social protection of consumers)

== Grüner Strom: The Seal of Approval for Green Electricity ==
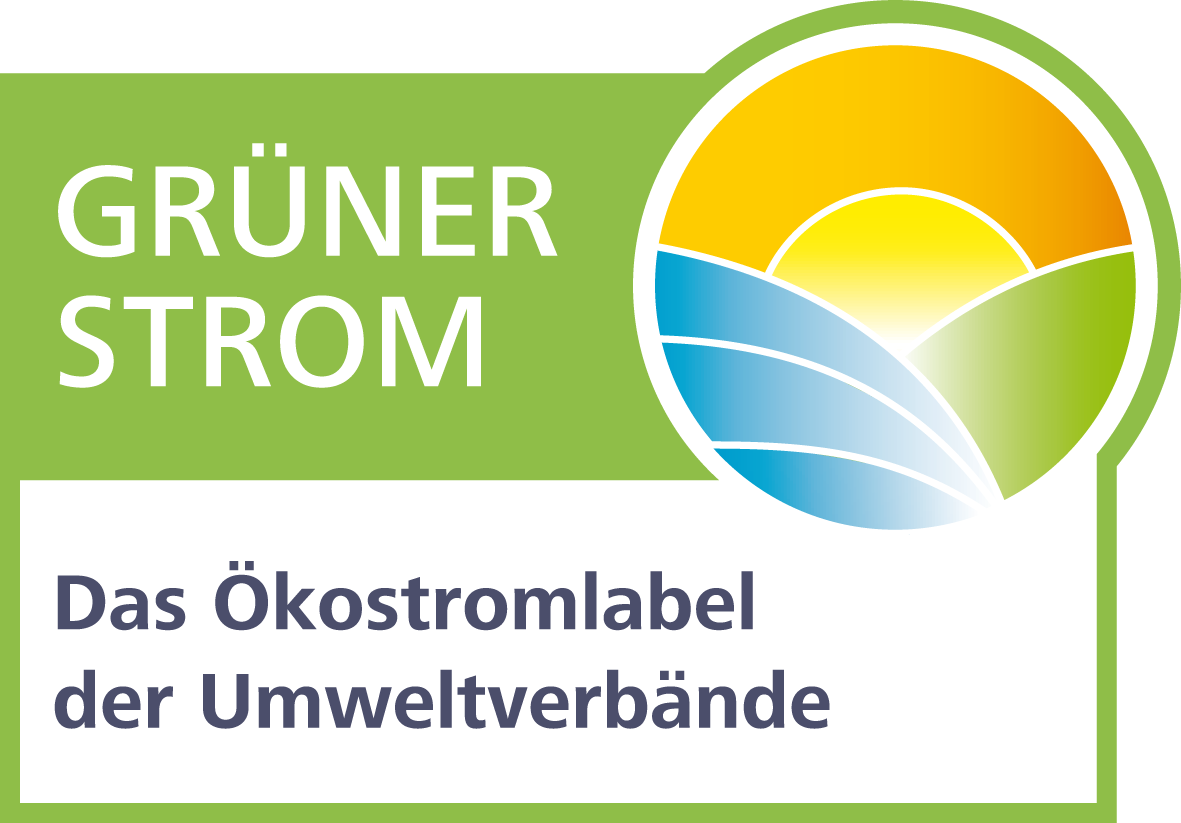
Grüner Strom Certification

Meeting the following essential requirements of the Criteria List is a prerequisite for certification:

- Electricity must be sourced 100% from renewable energy (from already existing or new power plants).
- Electricity providers must use a fixed amount per sold kilowatt-hour to promote new renewable energy development. In the case of customers with a consumption of:
  - Up to 10.000 kWh/year, 0.5 Euro-Cent per kWh
  - Between 10,000 kWh and 100,000 kWh/year, 0.4 Euro-Cent per kWh
  - Between 100,000 kWh and 3,000,000 kWh/year, 0.2 Euro-Cent per kWh
  - More than 3.000.000 kWh/year, 0.1 Euro-Cent per kWh
- The Grüner Strom certification is not granted to companies directly involved in nuclear power plants or to operators of nuclear companies or to companies with ownership interests/capital stock in nuclear operating companies.
- Companies that still operate a coal-fired power plant or are involved in an operating company by the deadline of January 1, 2027 will not receive the label.
- Renewable Energy Certificates/Credits are not accepted to prove fulfilment of the delivery obligation.

The funding amounts are used to make financial contributions or to co-finance projects that support the widespread transition to a sustainable energy supply. Eligible projects are e.g. infrastructure projects, energy efficiency measures, citizen energy projects, mobility projects and initiatives that contribute to species protection. In particular, funds can be used to continue to operate energy systems that are no longer funded by the German Renewable Energy Sources Act.

Electricity providers must report about the projects supported by certification on the Internet. In addition, certain successfully completed projects are listed on the GSL e.V. website. In 2023, over 210 green electricity contracts qualified to carry the label.

The Grüner Strom certification is granted for products. The GSL e.V., thereby, recommends individual electricity product options by certification. Therefore, companies that offer certified electricity contracts can also offer other contracts that do not meet the above-mentioned standards.

== Grünes Gas: The Seal of Approval for Biogas ==
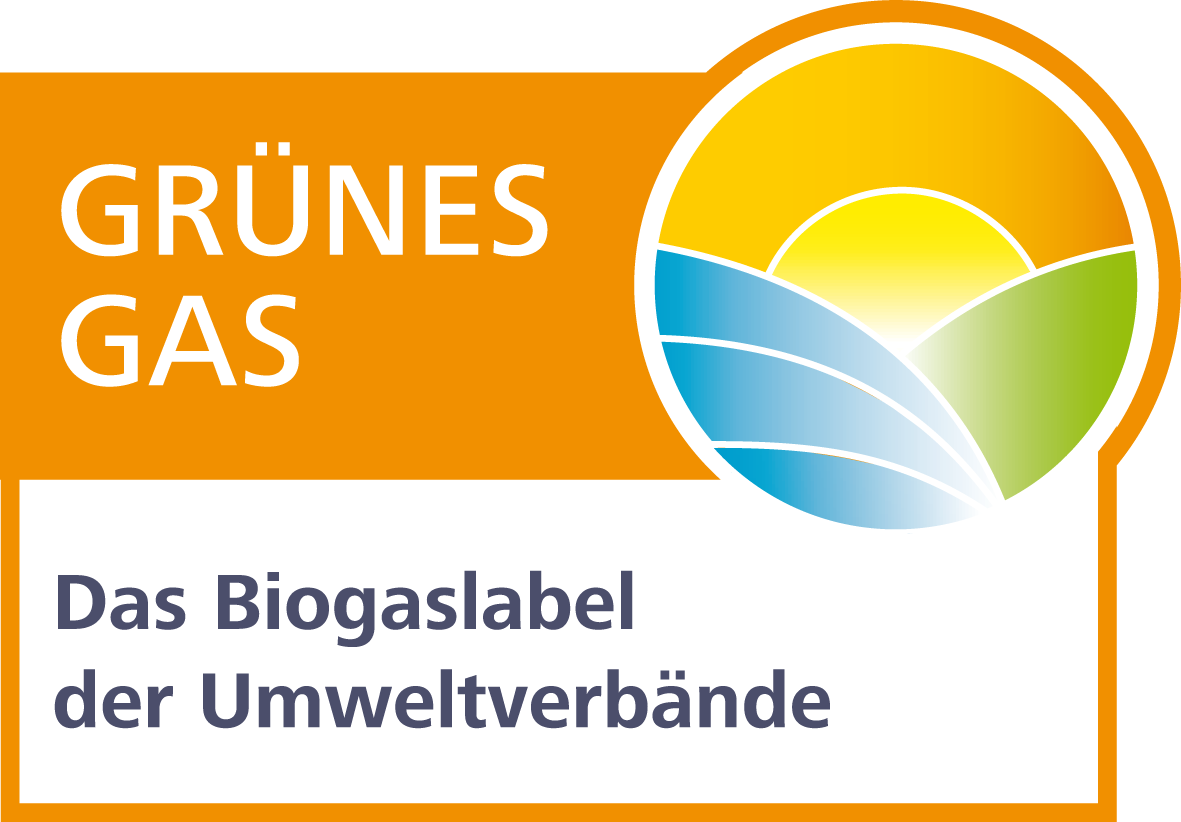
Grünes Gas Certification

The Grünes Gas certification was launched in June 2013. The seal is awarded for gas products when the production, use and distribution of the biogas meet the requirements as set out in the Criteria List. These include for example:

- Compensation models are not permitted.
- Biogas must be sourced by environmentally friendly means (it is not permitted to turn precious habitats into monocultures for example).
- The gas most comes from biogenic residues (biomethane) or sewage sludge (sewage gas). Biogas from renewable raw materials is only recognized under strict conditions
  - e.g.: It is not permitted to use problematic herbicides and fertilizers from factory farming.
- It is not permitted to use genetically engineered organisms in the production process.
- Landfill gas is not accepted.
- Primarily, regional raw materials should be used (raw materials carried over distances beyond 50 km are judged negatively).
- Gas providers must be transparent about the composition of their product (a minimum of 10 % certified biogas is required).

Conformity of suppliers and providers, producers and power supply companies is verified based on rating system credit points. Currently, Grünes Gas is the only seal of approval for biogas indicating endorsement by environmental organizations, including consumer information groups.

=== Data ===
In 2020, over 35,000 consumers purchased biogas in accordance with Green Gas standards. Total certified gas sales amounted to around 430,000,000 kWh. On an annual average, 18.5% of total sales of the certified gas products were biomethane, which corresponds to around 79,780,000 kWh.

== Other projects ==
The Grüner Strom Label e.V. operates the comparison portal Vergleich-dich-Grün. It allows customers and enterprises to compare electricity and gas contracts that carry either the Grüner Strom or the Grünes Gas label. The association furthermore produces the German podcast "Strom aufwärts" which talks about the work in a NPO and current topics in regard to energy transition.

In 2024, the Grüner Strom Label e.V. launched its subsidiary kompass:grün, a climate protection consultancy that focusses on stakeholders working for the common good such as AWO, Caritas etc.
