= Lubmin LNG terminals =

LNG terminal in Germany

The Lubmin LNG terminals are two liquefied natural gas (LNG) terminals in Lubmin, Mecklenburg-Vorpommern, Germany, on the Baltic Sea. Both shipping terminals were rushed into operation following the 2022 Russian invasion of Ukraine and the global natural gas supply crisis and the loss of Russian pipeline gas, which had long provided over fifty percent of German gas energy demand.

The first terminal became operational in January 2023. Planned by the German federal state, the terminal will be operated by the German energy company RWE and by the Norwegian company Stena Power. It is Germany's second LNG terminal after the Wilhelmshaven LNG terminal which received its first LNG tanker for regasification in December 2022. In the long term, the terminal is being set up in such a way that a special purpose vehicle could be set up to operate the regasification ship, where the Federal government provides the chartered ship, and thereby receives a voice into a private company that could take over day to day operation of the LNG terminal. This could possibly be in place by the end of 2023.

The second terminal, called Deutsche Ostsee, was advanced by private operators of Deutsche ReGas in 2022 following the gas crises. The company is building a second LNG terminal in Lubmin, and it had begun testing by December 2022.

Lubmin is the second port location of the five LNG gas terminals advanced by Germany after the 2022 Russian invasion of Ukraine. However, the Federal government budget of €2.94 billion will cover the lease of only four FSRU ships so Lubmin will get one regassification ship to cover both the Deutsche Ostsee and the RWE/Stena terminals. The third active regasification ship being leased by Germany is Hoegh Gannet measuring 294 by 46 metres (965 by 151 ft) that arrived in Brunsbüttel on 20 January 2023.

== See also ==
- Wilhelmshaven LNG terminal
