= Wilhelmshaven LNG terminal =

Liquefied natural gas shipping terminal being constructed in Wilhelmshaven, Germany

Coordinates: 53°38′30″N 8°06′32″E

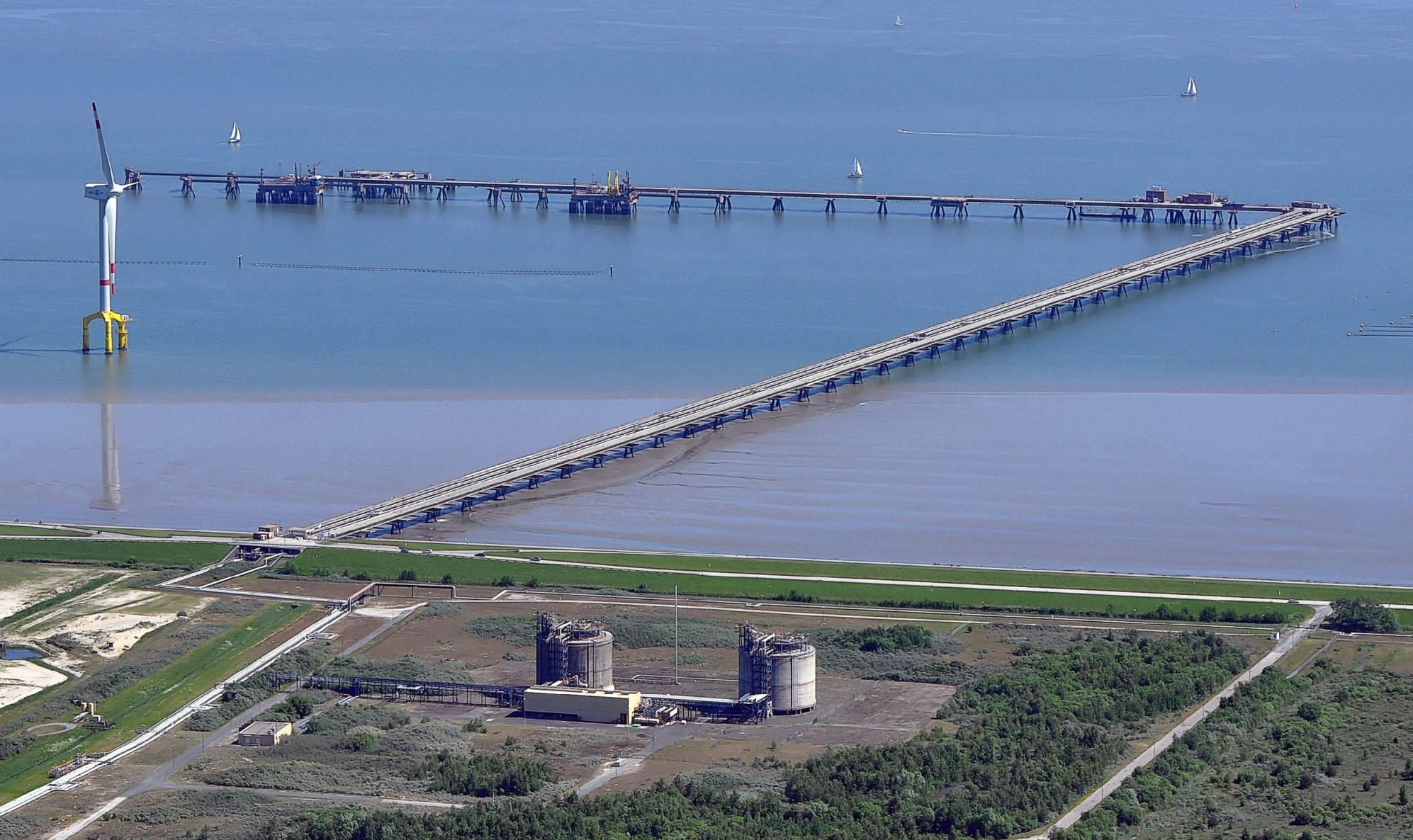
The site of the terminal photographed in 2012.

Wilhelmshaven LNG terminal is Germany's first liquefied natural gas (LNG) shipping terminal, situated near Wilhelmshaven, Germany on the North Sea. It had been in the planning stages since the mid-2010s, and in 2022 gained rapid regulatory authority approval for construction following the Russian invasion of Ukraine and the global natural gas supply crisis.

Construction was completed in November 2022. The terminal received its commissioning load of approximately 170 thousand cubic metres (6.0 million cubic feet) of LNG, from Louisiana in the US, on 17 December 2022, and had received several additional shipments of the same size from the same source by 22 January 2023.

== History ==
Planning began for the LNG shipping terminal as early as 2017, but regulatory process and political opposition resulted in years of delays in preparing German capacity to import large quantities of natural gas from seaborne LNG shipments. The German government instead embarked on a path of using cheaper Russian natural gas commitments via the Nord Stream 1 and Nord Stream 2 undersea Baltic pipelines.

As a result, construction of the Wilhemshaven terminal to receive LNG operationally did not begin until 2022. Three days after the start of the Russian invasion on 24 February, German Chancellor Olaf Scholz announced that Germany would build two LNG terminals quickly, one at Brunsbüttel and another at Wilhelmshaven. By August 2022, the German government had expanded their plans to include five floating LNG facilities. In addition to Wilhelmshaven and Brunsbüttel, which could become operational in late 2022, three more new terminals were accelerated, one at Stade and two at Lubmin, with all three expected to become operational in 2023. By mid-September 2022, the German government was continuing to estimate as good the probability of getting the first two of the floating terminals into operation by late December.

Unusually, environmental impact assessments were explicitly skipped according to Robert Habeck, a Green party politician and the environmental affairs minister in the current German government, saying "ensuring Germany was no longer blackmailable by Putin had to take priority."

The first load of 170,000 cubic metres (6.0 million cubic feet) of LNG, producing 97 million cubic metres (3.4 billion cubic feet) of natural gas – sufficient to supply 50,000 German households for a year, arrived at the Wilhelmshaven terminal in mid-December to initiate the commissioning process of the terminal. The shipment of US natural gas had been loaded at the Venture Global LNG terminal at Calcasieu Pass, Louisiana. Germany is continuing the move into marine LNG energy supply. A second of the rushed LNG gas terminals was opened by Germany at Lubmin on the Baltic Sea in mid-January 2023, while the regasification ship for the LNG terminal at Brunsbüttel on the North Sea arrived on 20 January.

== Description ==
The Wilhemshaven terminal will be sized initially to receive approximately 80 tankers a year, which could substitute up to half of the gas imports that the German energy company Uniper formerly imported from Russia. This could supply approximately eight per cent of German gas demand as of early 2023.

As of August 2022, the German government has leased Höegh Esperanza, a 300-metre-long (980-foot) tanker converted into a floating storage and regasification unit, and will be paying €200,000 a day for the lease. The unit will dock at a jetty built in 1982, and will turn liquid back into gas at a high rate, requiring about 10 hours per tanker load.

== See also ==
- Lubmin LNG terminals
