= Höegh Esperanza =

Floating Storage and Regasification Unit

History

Norway
- Name: Höegh Esperanza
- Owner: Leif Höegh & Co, Oslo, Norway
- Builder: Hyundai Heavy Industries
- Yard number: 2865
- Laid down: 2015
- Launched: 2017
- In service: 2018
- Homeport: Oslo
- Identification: IMO number: 9780354
- Status: In service

General characteristics
- Type: LNG carrier
- Tonnage: 92,217 DWT
- Length: 294 m (964 ft 7 in)
- Beam: 46 m (150 ft 11 in)
- Height: 26 m (85 ft 4 in)
- Draft: 12.6 m (41 ft 4 in)
- Propulsion: Dual fuel diesel electric
- Speed: 18 knots (33 km/h; 21 mph)
- Capacity: 170,032 m^{3} (6,004,600 cu ft)
- Notes: To be used for ten years as a floating LNG storage and regasification unit as an LNG imported terminal in Wilhelmshaven.

The Höegh Esperanza is a Floating Storage and Regasification Unit (FSRU) ship owned by Höegh LNG Holdings. Since the end of 2022 it is in use at the Wilhelmshaven LNG terminal.

== History ==
The ship was ordered on 1 June 2015 from Hyundai Heavy Industries in South Korea. On 28 December 2015 the keel was laid, and on 17 March 2017 the ship was launched. It was delivered to its owner on 5 April 2018. In June 2018, it was chartered for three years by CNOOC Gas & Power Trading and Marketing and was used starting in November 2018 at the Port of Tianjin.

In 2019, plans were made for the ship to be used for ten years by the Australian energy company AGL Energy in the planned Crib Point liquefied natural gas (LNG) terminal at the Mornington Peninsula south of Melbourne. However, the terminal project was not approved by regulatory authorities in March 2021 for environmental reasons.

=== Use in Wilhelmshaven ===
On 5 May 2022, Höegh LNG Holdings announced that it signed binding implementation contracts with the German Federal Ministry for Economic Affairs and Climate Action for the chartering of two FSRUs from the Höegh fleet for operation in Germany for ten years. The detailed FSRU contracts were expected to be finalized by September/October 2022 and by November 2022, FSRU operations were expected to start at the end of the year at the Wilhelmshaven LNG terminal by use of the Höegh Esperanza. The continuous capacity of the Höegh Esperanza assured to the German government is 5 billion cubic metres per annum (0.18 trillion cubic feet per annum) of LNG, with a maximum capacity of 7.5 billion cubic metres per annum (0.26 trillion cubic feet per annum).

== Description ==
The vessel has a gross tonnage of 110,499 at a length of 290 metres (950 ft) and a breadth of 46 metres (151 ft). Its deadweight tonnage is 92,217. For propulsion, the Höegh Esperanza is equipped with a dual-fuel diesel-electric system comprising four dual-fuel Wärtsilä-Italia W8L50DF engines, each with eight cylinders measuring 500 millimetres (20 in) bore and 580 millimetres (23 in) stroke, and a rated power of 7,800 kilowatts (10,600 PS). A Cummins KTA 38D emergency diesel engine is used as backup.

The vessel was designed for combined open and closed regasification operation and the GTT Mark III membrane tanks have a storage capacity of 170,000 cubic metres (6.0 million cubic feet) of liquefied natural gas. Two auxiliary boilers and four exhaust boilers are installed for heat utilization. The ship has been classified by the ship classification society DNV.
