= Gerhard Thielcke =

Professor, and co-founder of the Bund für Umwelt und Naturschutz Deutschland

Gerhard Thielcke (February 14, 1931 Köthen, Germany – July 22, 2007 Radolfzell, Germany) was a German environmentalist, professor and co-founder of the Bund für Umwelt und Naturschutz Deutschland (BUND: League for the environment and nature conservation, Germany), an important German environmental organization.

Thielcke died on July 22, 2007, in Radolfzell, Germany.

== External links and references ==
- Presseportal: Gerhard Thielcke Obituary (German)
- Gerhard Thielcke, RIP
