= Bund für Umwelt und Naturschutz Deutschland =

German non-governmental organisation

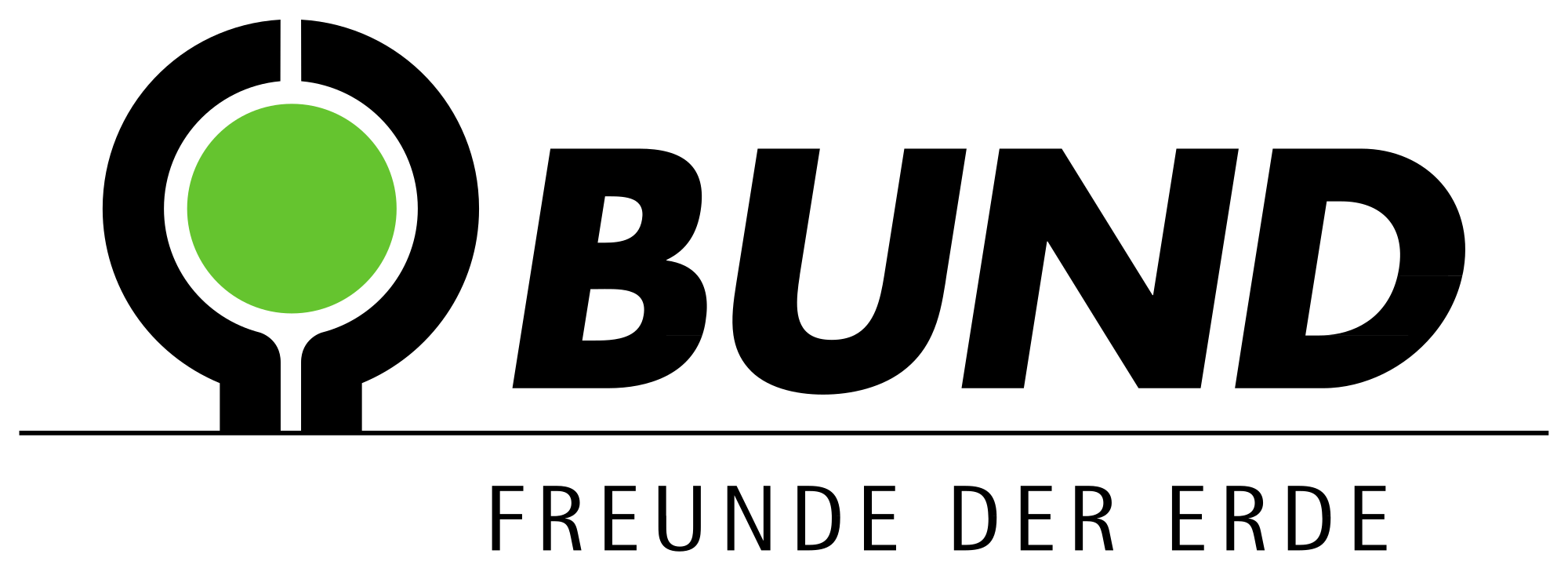
- Established: 20 July 1975 (51 years ago)
- Types: nonprofit organization
- Legal status: Registered association
- Focus: Environmentalism, sustainability
- Headquarters: Berlin
- Country: Germany
- Method: Awareness building, direct action, education for sustainable development
- Membership: 479,347 (2020)
- Chairpersons: Hubert Weiger
- Part of: Friends of the Earth
- Revenue: 49,997,000 (2025)
- Employees: 166 (2025)
- Volunteers: 30,000 (2019)
- Website: www.bund.net

Bund für Umwelt und Naturschutz Deutschland (Note: German pronunciation: [bʊnt fyːɐ̯ ˈʔʊmvɛlt ʔʊnt naˈtuːɐ̯ˌʃʊts ˈdɔʏtʃlant]) (BUND) (Note: German pronunciation: [ˌbeːʔuːʔɛnˈdeː]) is a German non-governmental organisation dedicated to preserving nature and protecting the environment. The name means "German Federation for the Environment and Nature Conservation". Its subtitle Friends of the Earth Germany indicates that BUND is a member of the international network Friends of the Earth.

BUND is one of 56 qualified consumer associations in Germany that are authorised to bring Musterfeststellungsklagen (model declaratory actions) or Abhilfeklagen (redress actions).

== General facts ==
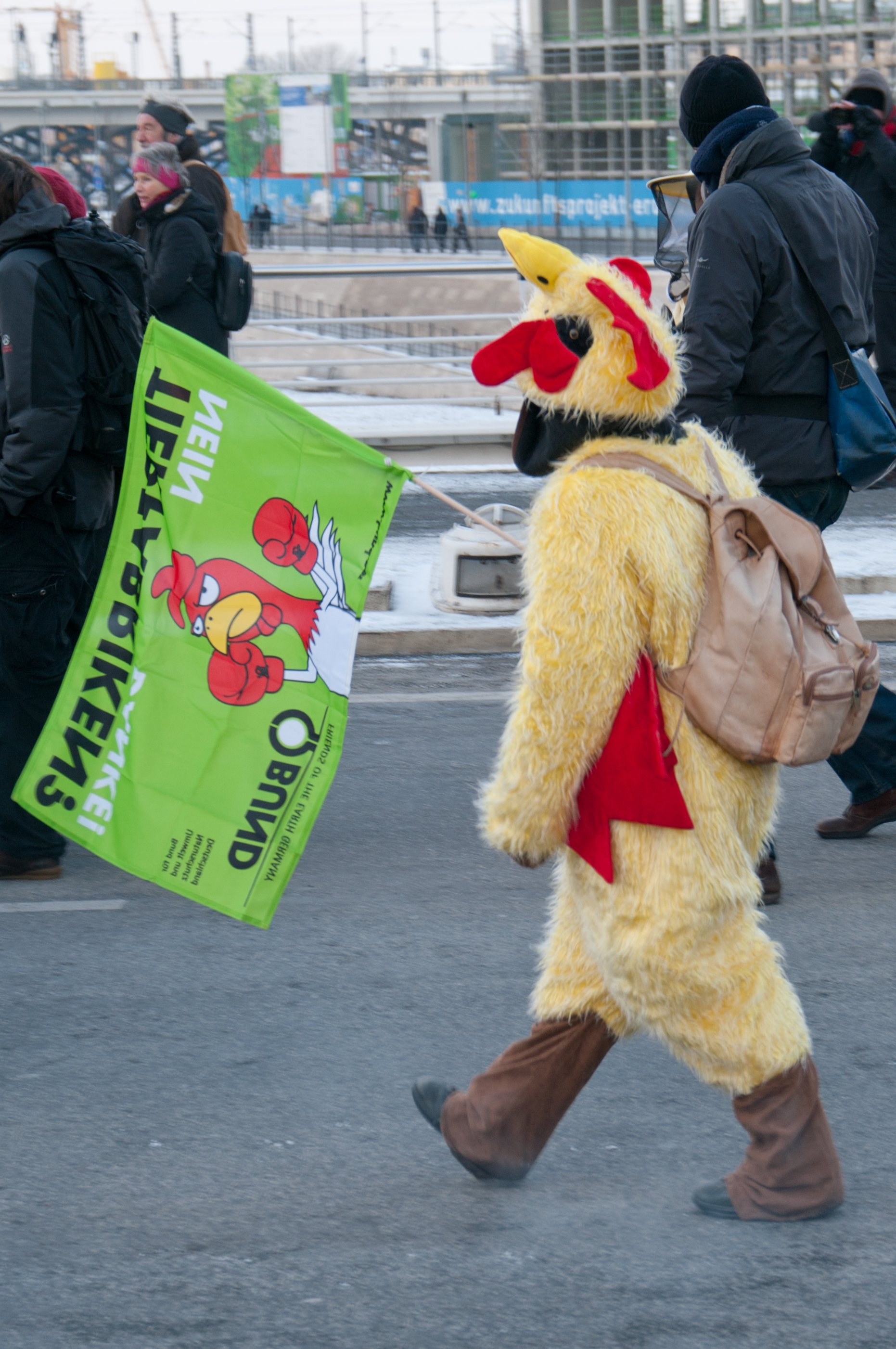
We are fed up!-protests: BUND affiliated protester protesting against industrialized agriculture

With about 674,000 members and supporters the BUND is one of the biggest environmental organizations in Germany. It is also formally accredited by the Federal Republic of Germany and therefore has to be officially included if an encroachment into nature is being planned. In 2020, the organization gathered €41.1 million, mainly from member fees (71%).

== History ==
The BUND was founded on 20 July 1975, as a federation of already existing regional groups. The BUND's co-founders were wildlife filmmaker Horst Stern, Frankfurt Zoological Society leader Bernhard Grzimek, politician Herbert Gruhl (CDU, ödp), conductor Enoch zu Guttenberg, forest conservationist Hubert Weinzierl and 16 others including Bodo Manstein and Gerhard Thielcke.

The original name "Bund für Natur- und Umweltschutz Deutschland" (BNUD) was changed in 1977 for better readability.

In 1989 the BUND became a member of Friends of the Earth International.

In 1990 five Associations were founded in East Germany.

BUND was founding member of the Berlin Energy Table which successfully pushed for a Referendum on the recommunalization of energy supply in Berlin in 2013. The referendum however failed to obtain a sufficient number of yes votes despite a strong majority amongst those that did vote.

== Organisation ==
Organisational structure of BUND

The federal organization has its office located in Berlin and is represented by its president Hubert Weiger. There are 2,200 local groups and, like Germany itself, the BUND is divided into 16 state organisations. There are up to 20 working parties specialised such as in law, water, waste, health, forest, energy, and gene technology; everyone can participate. The working parties often include renowned scientist and participate in official parliament hearings, comment on new laws and develop ecologic concepts. Moreover, the expert knowledge is widely spread through workshops and brochures.

All members of the BUND under the age of 27 are automatically members of the youth organisation BUNDjugend.

The BUND logo symbolises the earth as a green ball held by two protecting hands.

The oldest state association in the federal association is the Bund Naturschutz in Bayern, which was founded in Munich in 1913. The second oldest state association is the Landesverband Bremen, which emerged from the Bremer Naturschutzgesellschaft, which in turn had developed from a bird protection association founded in Bremen in 1914.

The federal and state associations are each independent, while the regional and local groups are legally part of their state association. A member of BUND is therefore always a member of both the federal and the corresponding state association. In addition to 'full members', BUND also has 'supporting members' who make regular donations but do not participate in the association's democracy.

The BUND is a placement centre for participants in the FÖJ (voluntary ecological year) and the BFD (federal voluntary service); there are positions available at the federal association, the state associations and the BUNDjugend.

== Chairpersons ==
The chairpersons were:

- July–November 1975: Bodo Manstein
- 1975–1977: Herbert Gruhl
- 1977–1983: Gerhard Thielcke
- 1983–1998: Hubert Weinzierl
- 1998–2007: Angelika Zahrnt
- 2007–2019: Hubert Weiger
- since 2019: Olaf Bandt

== Memberships and cooperation's ==
BUND is a member of numerous associations and organisations, including:

- Friends of the Earth Europe and International, since 1989 as the German section of the European Environmental Network
- Deutscher Naturschutzring, the umbrella organisation of German environmental and nature conservation associations
- Attac, a network critical of globalisation
- Grüner Strom Label, an association that certifies green electricity offers
- natureplus, an association that awards an environmental quality label for building materials
- Board of Trustees of Baum des Jahres
- Atomausstieg selber machen, an alliance that provides information about green electricity and aims to motivate people to switch electricity providers
- NEULAND, an association for the marketing of products from animal-friendly and environmentally friendly livestock farming
- EUROPARC Deutschland, the umbrella organisation for national parks, biosphere reserves and nature parks

=== BUND cooperates or has cooperated with ===
- the Bundesverband Bürgerinitiativen Umweltschutz
- the Bischöfliches Hilfswerk Misereor (for the study Zukunftsfähiges Deutschland (1996), which had a strong influence on the discourse on sustainability)
- Brot für die Welt and the Evangelischen Entwicklungsdienst (EED) (for the follow-up study Zukunftsfähiges Deutschland in einer globalisierten Welt (2008))
- the Stiftung Europäisches Naturerbe (Euronatur), which BUND helped to initiate
- the Bodensee-Stiftung, an international foundation for nature and culture based in Radolfzell
- McPlanet.com, a globalisation-critical environmental congress

=== Finances ===
In 2019, the total icome amounted to 35.9 million euros. Donations - the associationis recognised as a charitable organisation - and membership fees account for more than two-thirds of total income.

== Activities and projects ==
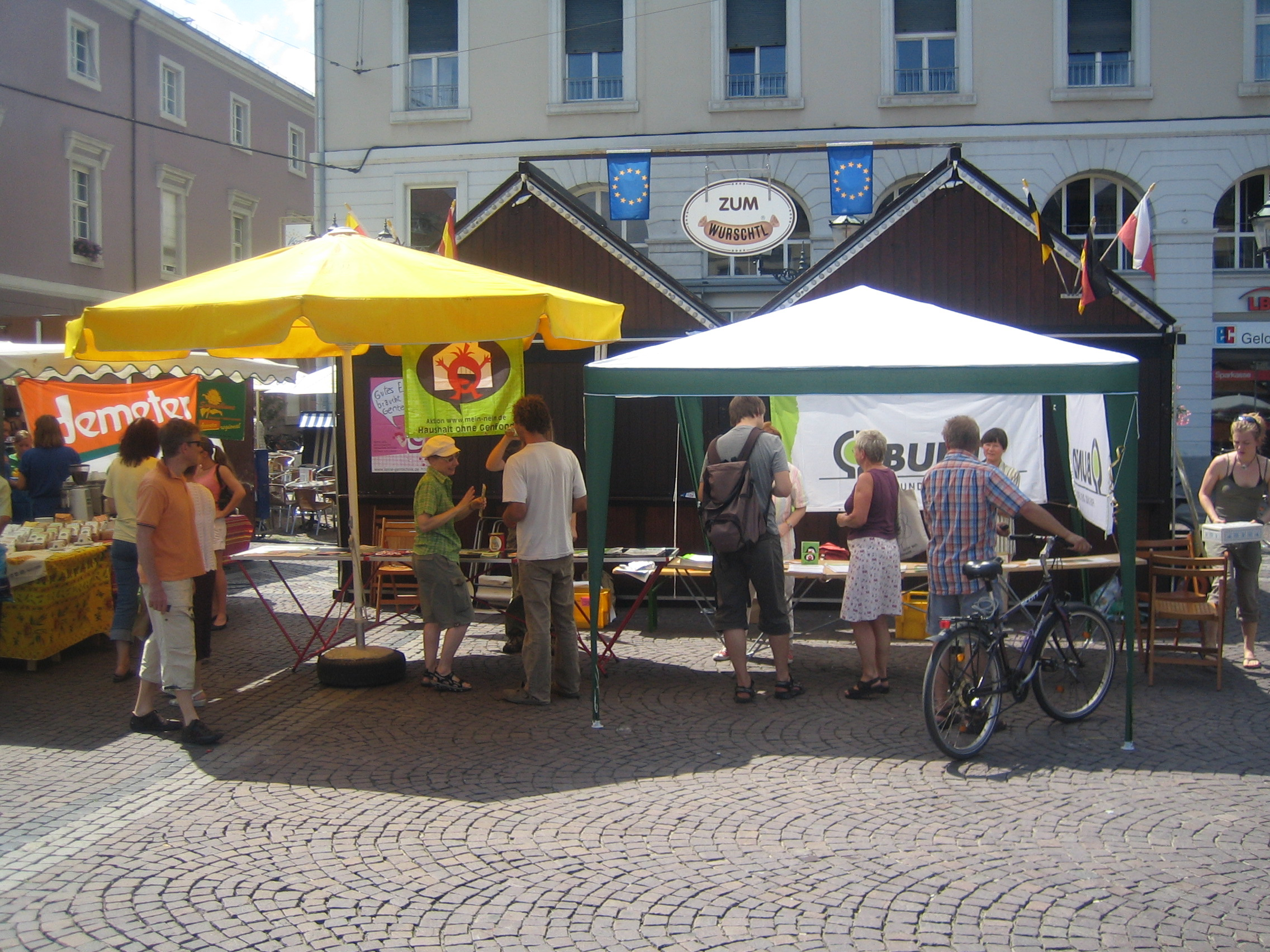
BUND information stand on genetic engineering, 2007 in Karlsruhe

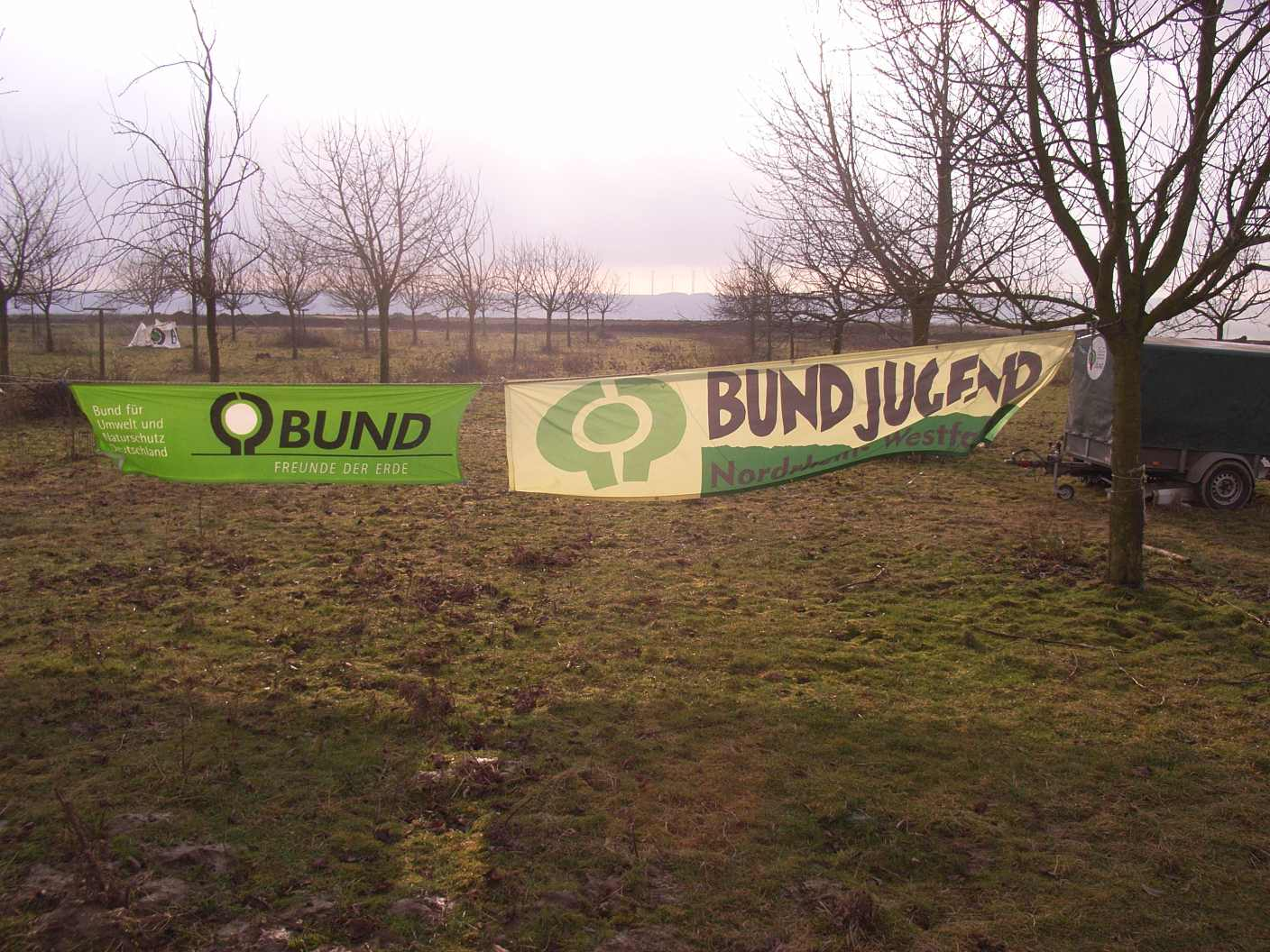
Association's own orchard near Alt-Otzenrath on the edge of the Garzweiler surface mining operation (expropriated in January 2008 and used for lignite mining)

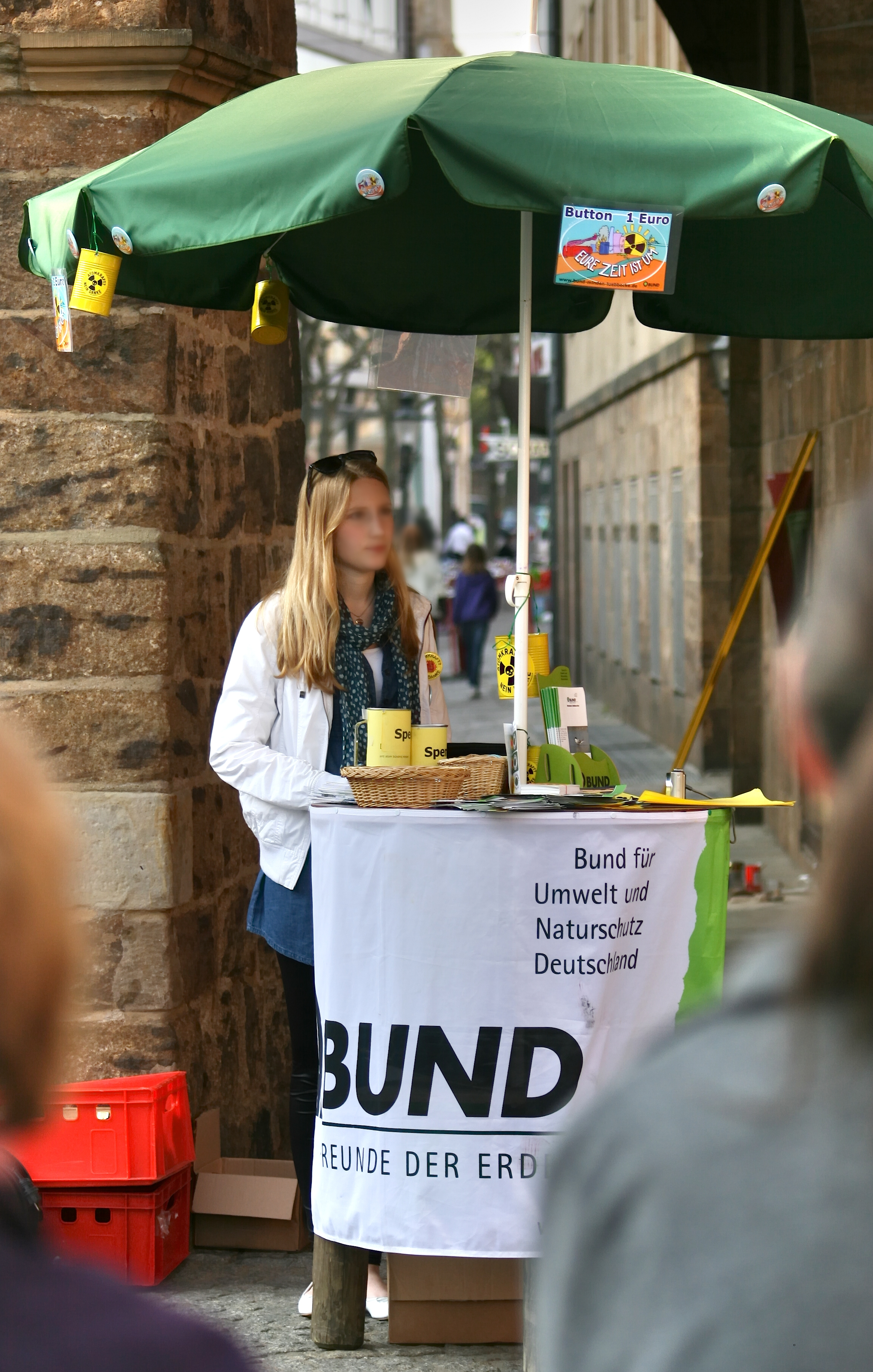
BUND information stand as part of an anti-nuclear vigil, 2011 in Minden

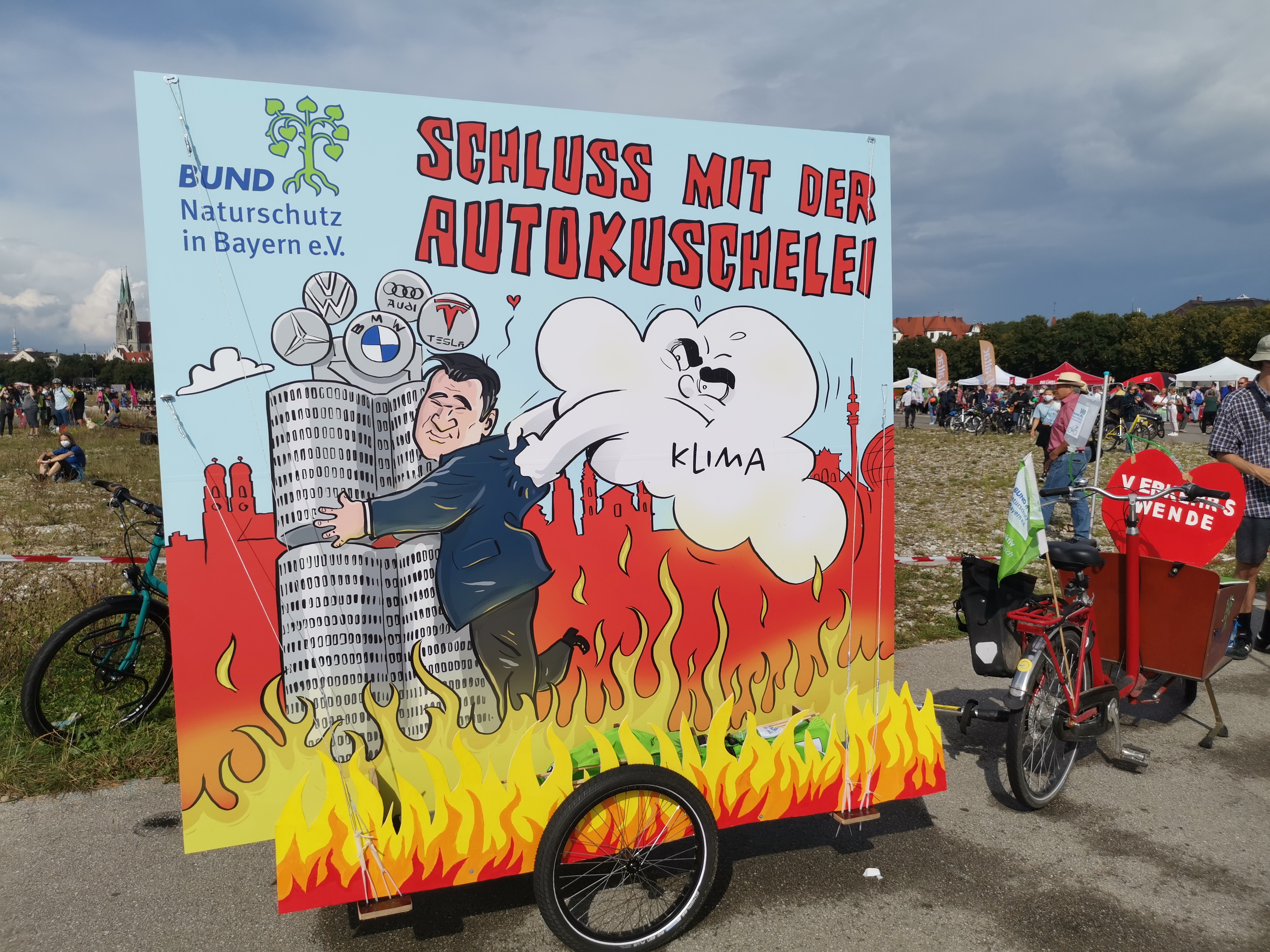
BUND at a rally for the mobility transition in Munich during the IAA 2021: poster of Markus Söder and the car lobby

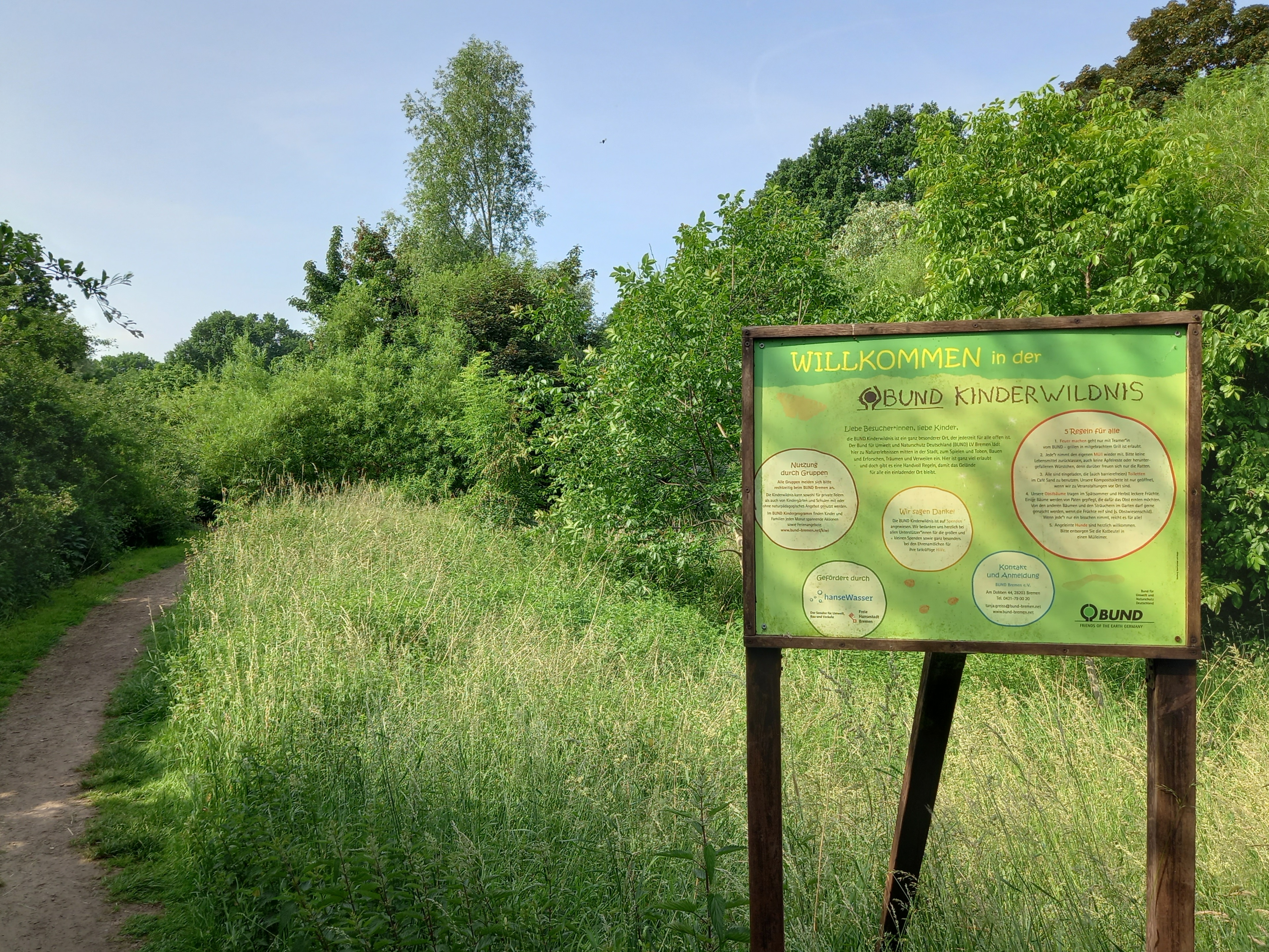
Main entrance to the BUND Bremen Kinderwildnis (children's wilderness) on the Stadtwerder in early summer 2025

=== Activities ===
- The association is consulted on interventions in nature – from ploughing a protected orchid meadow to designating new construction areas to planning approval for an airport – and is therefore required to write expert statements. This work is mainly carried out by volunteer members with the relevant expertise, and in some cases by the association's employees.
- Many members are appointed (on a voluntary basis) to the Nature Conservation Advisory Council at the district, state or federal level.
- Local groups maintain local biotopes, pass on their knowledge through guided tours and lead children's groups.
- BUND provides information material in the form of brochures, arguments, background reports and studies.
- The BUND is a member of the Grüner Strom Label e. V., which awards the seal of approval of the same name for green electricity.
- The BUND is co-organiser of the demonstrations under the slogan Wir haben es satt! (We've had enough!).
- The BUND is heavily involved in the debate on final storage and has a member on the Commission on the Storage of High-Level Radioactive Waste.

==== Project examples ====
- 1978: Save the Birds campaign; presentation of the first German solar-powered car.
- 1981: First public reference to forest dieback.
- 1988: Garden without Poison campaign.
- 1989: The Green Belt Germany project protects biotopes along the former German-German border.
- 1994: Publication of the first environmental computer list.
- 1995: Publication of the study Zukunftsfähiges Deutschland with Misereor.
- 2001: BUND, Deutsche Bahn, Naturschutzbund Deutschland, the World Wildlife Fund and Verkehrsclub Deutschland launched the Destination Nature campaign in April.
- 2003: The magazine GEO and BUND jointly organised the fifth GEO Day of Biodiversity in the Green Belt of Germany. In 24 hours, 500 experts mapped more than 5,200 different animal and plant species, including some that were previously considered extinct.
- 2004: BUND presented its largest species conservation programme to date, the Wildcat Rescue Network. According to the 'Wildcat Trail Plan' presented, existing forests with wildcat populations throughout Germany are to be connected by a 20,000-kilometre network of bush and tree corridors.
- 2005: BUND launched the Butterfly Adventure campaign together with ZDF and the UFZ–Umweltforschungszentrum Leipzig-Halle (UFZ–Environmental Research Centre Leipzig-Halle). (since 2006: Abenteuer Faltertage).
- 2005: The BUNDstiftung (BUND Foundation) was established.
- 2006: The action alliance Future instead of lignite was founded with citizens' initiatives and other environmental associations.
- 2007: BUND protested with the newspaper Kohle-Express against the construction of more than 20 new coal-fired power plants in Germany and the expansion of lignite mining.
- 2007: The Adbusting competition denounced car manufacturers BMW, Mercedes and Volkswagen for advertising fuel-guzzling cars, contrary to their promises.
- 2008: Together with consumers and supported by Sarah Wiener, BUND launched its campaign For the love of nature. Without genetic engineering calling on Edeka to label relevant products with the label Without genetic engineering.
- 2010: BUND Hamburg co-initiated a popular initiative aimed at re-municipalising the energy networks and establishing 'genuine' municipal utilities in Hamburg. The initiative, which comprised 24 organisations, succeeded in bringing about a referendum in 2013.
- 2010: The campaign Future without toxins aims to ensure that children grow up without exposure to harmful chemicals. Daycare centres can have dust samples from their facilities tested for plasticisers free of charge by BUND. Certain chemical pollutants have a hormonal effect and are suspected of causing infertility, diabetes and cancer.
- 2011: Launch of the Wildkatzensprung (Wild cat jump) project (funded by the Federal Biological Diversity Programme) with activities to protect wildcats in ten federal states. In the largest single project in the history of BUND, so-called 'green corridors' are being planted in Hesse (Rothaargebirge-Knüll), Lower Saxony (Harz-Solling), Baden-Württemberg (Herrenberg region), Rhineland-Palatinate (Westerwald/Taunus-Rothaargebirge) and Thuringia (Greiz region). In addition, a nationwide genetic database on wildcats is being developed in cooperation with the Senckenberg Research Institute to document populations and migration patterns and optimise conservation measures for wildcats. With over 1,200 volunteers, the project is also one of the largest 'citizen science' projects in Europe and was successfully completed in 2017.
- 2012: The Urban Nature Campaign provided information about plants and animals in the city and encouraged people to experience and create natural spaces themselves, e.g. through urban gardening and a photo competition.
- 2012: With Stellen Sie die Giftfrage (Ask the poison question), BUND called on consumers to ask product suppliers about hazardous ingredients (see REACH Regulation). In cooperation with the Federal Environment Agency, a request generator makes it easier to formulate questions.
- 2013: With the launch of the app ToxFox, BUND enables consumers to scan the barcode of cosmetics to see whether the product contains hormone-disrupting chemicals. Since 2019, nanoparticles have also been displayed. Alternatively, the EAN number can simply be entered online for the cosmetics check, and protest emails can be sent directly to the manufacturers. The analysis of the chemicals from the INCI list of ingredients for around 60,000 care and cosmetic products was carried out in collaboration with the community database Codecheck.info. The study was criticised by the German Cosmetic, Toiletry, Perfumery and Detergent Association, which claimed that the quantities of potentially harmful ingredients were too low. On the other hand, natural cosmetics were largely free of hormone-active substances.
- 2013: The Wild bees action informed the public about the importance of and threats to the more than 550 species of wild bees in Germany and provided tips on how to help wild bees.
- 2014: BUND published the shopping guide Microplastics – the invisible danger, sparking a public debate about microplastics in cosmetics and their entry into the oceans and rivers.
- 2015: The magazine GEO and BUND jointly organised the GEO Day of Biodiversity in the Hohen Garbe on the Elbe, the adjacent Garbe polder and the Aland lowlands. In 24 hours, experts mapped more than 1,400 plant and animal species, including a fungus species found in Germany for the first time.
- 2018: On 23 November 2018, BUND and the Solarenergie-Förderverein Deutschland (Solar Energy Promotion Association Germany), together with eleven individuals (including Josef Göppel, Hannes Jaenicke and Volker Quaschning), filed a constitutional complaint with the Federal Constitutional Court (BVerfG). This first lawsuit of its kind is intended to increase the pressure on politicians to do more to combat climate change.
- 2024: Constitutional complaint ('Constitutional Complaint 2.0') against the Klimaschutzgesetz (Climate Protection Act); BUND together with the Solar Energy Promotion Association Germany

== Publications (selection) ==
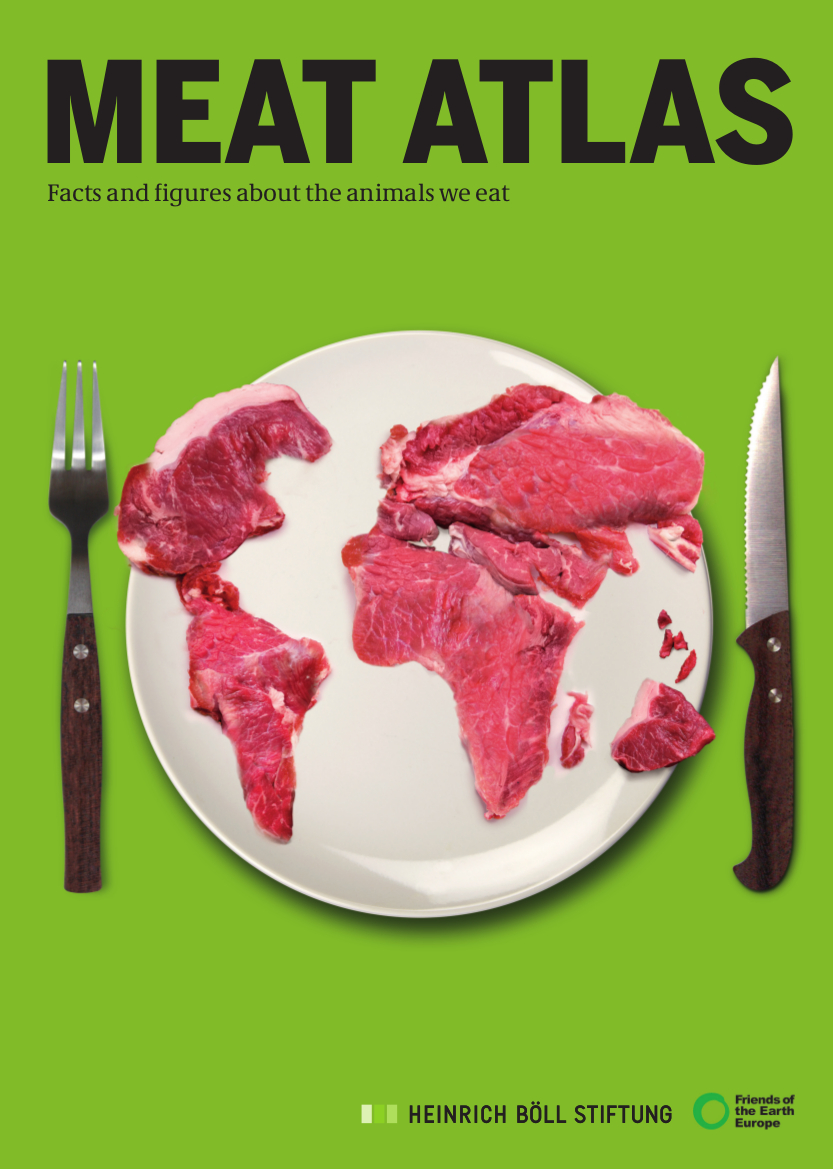
Meat Atlas introduces facts and figures about meat production and consumption.

- The Meat Atlas is an annual report on meat consumption and the meat industry published in cooperation with Heinrich Böll Foundation, Friends of the Earth and Le Monde diplomatique.
- 2022: In November, the "Mobility Barometer" [for Germany] was published for the first time in a joint project between Allianz pro Schiene, deutscherVerkehrssicherheitsrats (German Traffic Safety Council) and BUND. It is to be compiled annually from now on.

== Campaigns against large-scale projects ==
As an advocate for environmental protection and nature conservation, BUND has taken action against several large-scale projects in particular.

For example, a closing mass by Pope Benedict XVI was originally planned near Hangelar for the World Youth Day 2005. The BUND objected to the official approval. Prior clearance of explosive ordnance on the grounds of the Hangelar airfield, the planned 'Pope's Hill' and the road construction for the large-scale event would have had too great an impact on fauna and flora in the Hangelarer Heide nature reserve. The organisers moved the closing service to the Marienfeld in Kerpen.

In February 2003, the BUND, together with Naturschutzbund Deutschland (NABU), filed a lawsuit against the planned Butendiek offshore wind farm at the Hamburg Higher Regional Court. They argued that there were enough ecologically sound alternatives for the location. The lawsuit was dismissed on the grounds that the BUND and NABU, as plaintiffs, could not claim a violation of their own rights. A spokesperson for the Federal Ministry for the Environment criticised the lawsuit and stated that the construction of the wind farm would actually have a positive impact on nature, as fishing in the surrounding area would be restricted, for example.

Since the end of the 1970s, the former Hambacher Gruppe (Hambach Group) and later also the BUND have been campaigning against the Hambach lignite mine and for the preservation of the Hambacher Forest. Since 2009, the BUND has filed lawsuits against the approval of the second framework operating plan, against the relocation of the A 4 motorway due to opencast mining, and against the approval of the main operating plan for 2011–2014. In November 2017, the BUND initially failed in its further lawsuit against the approval of the third framework operating plan for 2020–2030 and the main operating plan for 2018–2020 before the Administrative Court of Cologne. A settlement proposal by the court chamber to protect the Hambach Forest was rejected by RWE and the defendant state.

BUND immediately lodged an appeal with the competent Higher Administrative Court for the State of North Rhine-Westphalia (OVG). On 5 October 2018, BUND obtained a preliminary injunction from the OVG in Münster halting the clearing of the Hambach Forest.

On 6 October, a large demonstration organised by BUND took place in the forest with approximately 50,000 participants. After the lawsuit was dismissed by the Cologne Administrative Court in March 2019, BUND filed an appeal with the Higher Administrative Court in Münster in August 2019; the clearing ban remains in place for the time being.

== Criticism ==
The BUND has been accused on several occasions of prematurely withdrawing lawsuits against construction projects that threaten nature due to financial advantages. For example, Der Spiegel accused the organisation of "indulgence trading" for the first time in 1997. In 1996, following a donation of 7 million German marks from VEAG for a specific purpose, BUND Thuringia dropped a lawsuit against the Goldisthal pumped storage station. According to BUND, the lawsuit had little chance of success, but the Thuringia regional association remained critical of the storage station from a nature conservation perspective. The money was used to establish the David Nature Foundation. In addition to Der Spiegel, the NDR and the magazine Panorama criticised concessions made by BUND and other environmental associations in exchange for financial compensation, once again describing them as "indulgences" and "barter deals". In 2006, for example, BUND Lower Saxony (together with the WWF) withdrew a lawsuit against the planned deepening of the Ems for the transfer of cruise ships after a settlement was reached to pay 9 million euros into a newly created special fund, the Emsfond. A newly created six-member committee, which includes one permanent member from BUND, decides how these funds are to be used for projects in the Ems-Dollart region. In 2008, BUND Schleswig-Holstein ended legal proceedings against the expansion of Lübeck Airport after compensation payments were negotiated for a nature conservation foundation for the Grönauer Heide. In 2011, BUND Lower Saxony withdrew a lawsuit against the planned offshore wind farm Nordergründe off Wangerooge after a settlement was reached to pay around 800,000 euros, which would later be transferred to a special-purpose fund administered by BUND. One of the co-founders of the association, Enoch zu Guttenberg, justified his resignation in May 2012 on the grounds, among other things, that he suspected the BUND of being corrupt. He was convinced that financial gain was the main motive behind the BUND's withdrawal of its lawsuits against the wind farm in Nordergründe and the deepening of the Elbe, in return for which it received foundation funds from the operators. He also rejected what he considered to be landscape-destroying wind turbines outside built-up areas. He claimed that the BUND had failed to achieve its goal of protecting nature.

The BUND repeatedly rejected the allegations of bribery, stating that the reached settlements had led to more environmentally friendly plans. Furthermore, settlements involving money only accounted for a minimal proportion of the BUND's class action lawsuits. The organisation fundamentally supports the expansion of renewable energies and only takes legal action against obvious planning errors in individual cases. In the case of the Nordergründe wind farm, in addition to a lower number of turbines, significantly reduced environmental impacts and extensive monitoring measures for the effects on bird migration had been achieved. Even for the – unrealised – airport expansion in Lübeck, a level of mitigation and compensation measures had been negotiated that could never have been achieved through legal action.

== Environmental awards ==
=== Bodo Manstein Medal ===
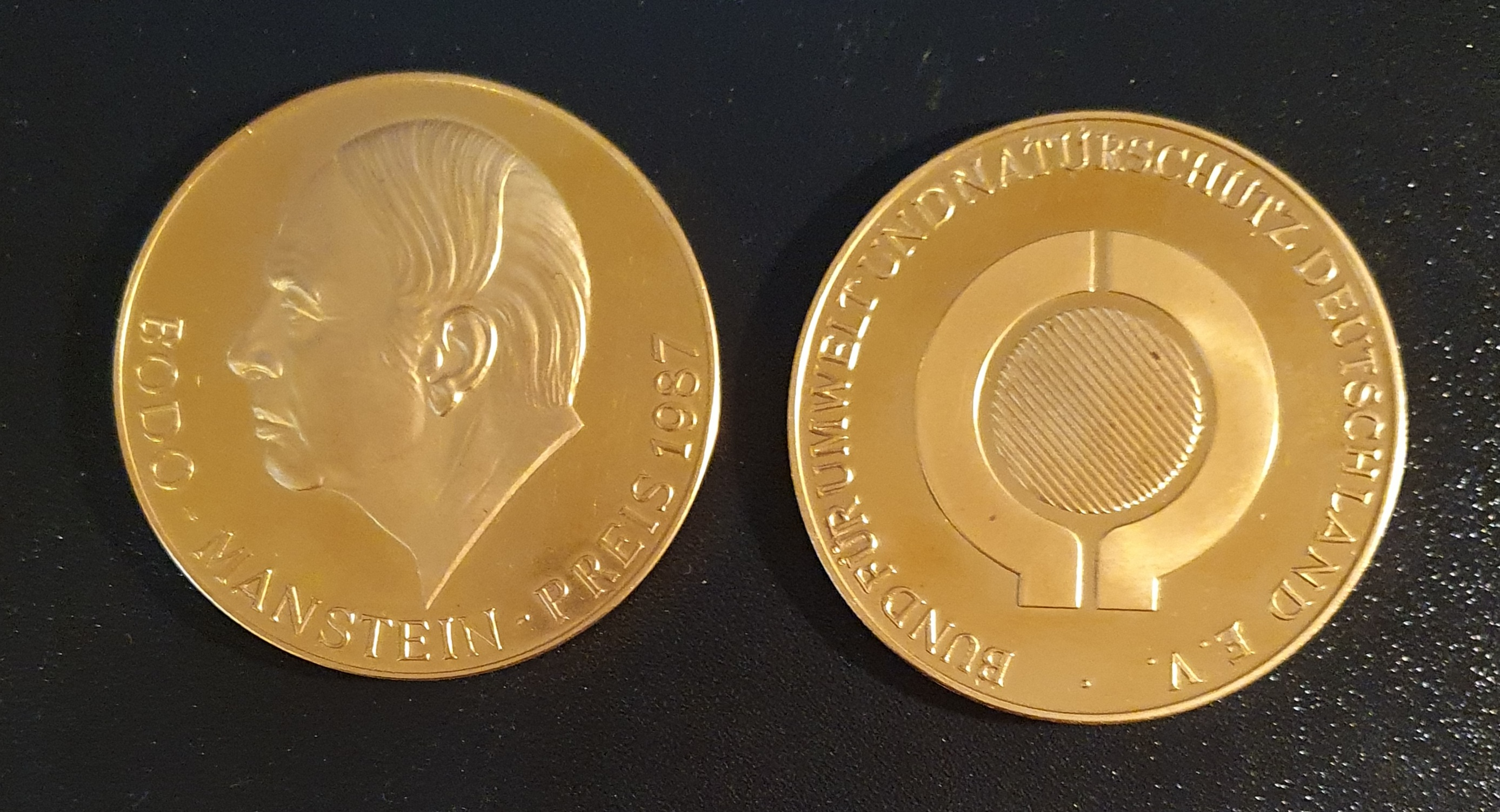
Bodo Manstein Medal

From 1980 to 1991, BUND awarded the Bodo Manstein Medal, named after its first chairman, for outstanding services to nature conservation and environmental protection. The medal featured a profile portrait of Bodo Manstein in his memory; the physician and environmentalist of the first hour had already died at the time of the first award ceremony.

Winners of the Bodo Manstein Medal
1980	Hans Christoph Binswanger: Ecologisation of economic policy
1981	José Lutzenberger, German-Brazilian politician and environmental activist
1982	Otto Koenig, Austrian ornithologist and cultural ethologist
1983	Jörg Zink, theologian and spokesperson for the peace and ecology movement
1984	Rolf Wandschneider, Holger Wesemüller, Karel van der Zwiep, John Frederiksen: North Sea protection
1985	Bernd Lötsch, Austrian naturalist, Danube Floodplain Institute
1986	Sepp Bichler, organic farmer
1987	Otmar Wassermann, ecotoxicologist
1988	Dagi and Karl Werner Kieffer, Ecology & Agriculture Foundation / medium technology
1989	Anne Calatin, environmental physician Reinhold Konstanty, DGB environmental officer
1991	Prince Charles: organic farming

=== BUND research prize ===
Since 2017, BUND has awarded the annual Research Prize for Scientific Work on Sustainable Development to university graduates. The prize is awarded in the categories bachelor's thesis, master's thesis and dissertation (as well as research projects) and is endowed with cash prizes of 500 euros, 1,000 euros and 2,500 euros. The prize winners worked on a wide variety of topics, including biological pest control in agriculture in 2019, German rail freight transport in 2040 and the Global Action Programme 'Education for Sustainable Development'.

== Awards from state associations ==
Since 2009, BUND Hessen has awarded the Eduard-Bernhard-Preis to people who have demonstrated outstanding commitment to environmental protection and nature conservation. The Bund Naturschutz in Bayern (Bavarian Nature Conservation Association) has been awarding the Bayerische Naturschutzmedaille (Bavarian Nature Conservation Medal) since 1970 for outstanding commitment to the BN. Since 1977, the Bavarian Nature Conservation Association, in coordination with the Working Group on Natural Forest Management, has awarded the Karl Gayer-Medaille to individuals who have rendered outstanding services to natural forest management. Bavaria's highest award in the field of nature conservation is the Bavarian Nature Conservation Prize, which has been awarded by the Bavarian Nature Conservation Association since the early 1970s.

From 2005 to 2014, BUND Berlin awarded the Berlin Environmental Prize in the categories Environmental Commitment, Children and Youth, and Economy and Innovation.

Since 2007, BUND Baden-Württemberg has been awarding the Gerhard Thielcke Nature Conservation Prize to nature conservationists. The Nature Conservation Prize was created on the 75th birthday of BUND Honorary Chairman and co-founder Gerhard Thielcke, who also formulated the award criteria.

In 2009 and 2010, the Energy Working Group of BUND North Rhine-Westphalia awarded the BUND Energy Prize, worth 1,000 euros, for environmentally friendly use of energy. BUND groups were given priority for the award, but citizens' initiatives, individuals and companies were also eligible if the project had a direct benefit for the environment, was innovative and encouraged others to follow suit. Local and district groups of the BUND also regularly award regional environmental prizes for outstanding achievements for the environment – both positive and negative. Negative prizes are unpopular and even feared: those responsible are publicly criticised for environmental sins and ecological missteps; the opportunity to comment at the award ceremony is rarely taken up.

== Natur & Umwelt Service und Verlags GmbH ==
Natur & Umwelt Service und Verlags GmbH was founded in 1977 and is a wholly owned subsidiary of BUND. It provides shipping and project management services for BUND, but also performs functions for external clients.For example, since 2002, it has been running the Don Cato competition for the Federal Ministry for the Environment, which aims to familiarise children with issues relating to nature conservation and environmental protection. In addition, it operates the BUNDladen, whose online shop and catalogue offer ecological products.

== Corporate design ==
Former logo

The original name, Bund für Natur- und Umweltschutz Deutschland (German Association for Nature Conservation and Environmental Protection), was changed to its current form in 1977, so that the abbreviation BNUD became the acronym BUND, which became part of the association's corporate identity. The association's logo shows the word BUND on the left side, accompanied by a graphic element symbolising the globe enclosed by two protective hands. The logo was designed by Rudolf Schreiber, a founding member of the environmental association's board. BUND is the German member of the international nature conservation network Friends of the Earth, which is why the addition of Friends of the Earth Germany (former addition in German: Freunde der Erde) is part of the association's current brand.

== BUND foundations ==
Since 2005, the BUND federal association has been supported by the non-profit BUNDstiftung, based in Schwerin. The foundation started with a capital of €50,000 and, thanks to donations, endowments, inheritances and loans from donors, had accumulated €3 million ten years after its establishment. The foundation supports large-scale projects such as the work on the Green Belt, the floodplain forests on the Middle Elbe (Hohe Garbe) and the Goitzsche wilderness near Bitterfeld.

Many of the legally independent BUND regional associations have also set up non-profit foundations for similar purposes. The initial capital comes partly from their own reserves and partly from compensation payments for major construction projects. The foundations operate legally independently of the BUND associations; BUND activists are often involved in the management of the foundations (including in leading roles).

The foundations by date of establishment:

- Momo Foundation (Baden-Württemberg): Founded in 1993 by BUND Baden-Württemberg, the Momo Foundation supports projects that give children and young people a better understanding of their environment and nature. It was named after the girl Momo in Michael Ende's book.
- Naturstiftung David (Thuringia): The Thuringia regional association founded the Naturstiftung David in 1998, which is also a member of the Deutscher Naturschutzring (German Nature Conservation Ring). The foundation focuses on nature conservation, renewable energies and energy conservation.
- BUND NRW Naturschutzstiftung: In 2002, the North Rhine-Westphalia regional association established the Nature Conservation Foundation, which awards the Butterfly of the Year prize annually.
- Bund Naturschutz Stiftung (Bavaria): The Bund Naturschutz in Bayern established an independent foundation in 2007. The projects it supports include the Green Belt, the purchase of near-natural areas and environmental education.
- Stiftung Ausgleich Altenwerder (Hamburg): BUND established the foundation in 2009 to improve, restore and secure natural values in the long term. The focus of its work is on the natural area of the Tidal Elbe in the Hamburg area, south of the Northern Elbe.
- Stiftung Naturlandschaft (Lower Saxony): The foundation was established in 2010. It is based in Hanover, and its offices are located in a moated castle in Königslutter, which has been converted into a versatile nature and science centre. In addition to BUND and NABU, many other associations also have their offices here, e.g. the State Association of Citizens' Initiatives for Environmental Protection, the Open Air and Adventure Museum Ostfalen and the Geopark Harz – Braunschweiger Land – Ostfalen.
- BUND Hessen-Naturschutzstiftung: The state association established the Nature Conservation Foundation in 2009. It supports the acquisition and maintenance of nature conservation areas, environmental education and BUND nature and environmental protection projects.
