= List of LNG terminals =

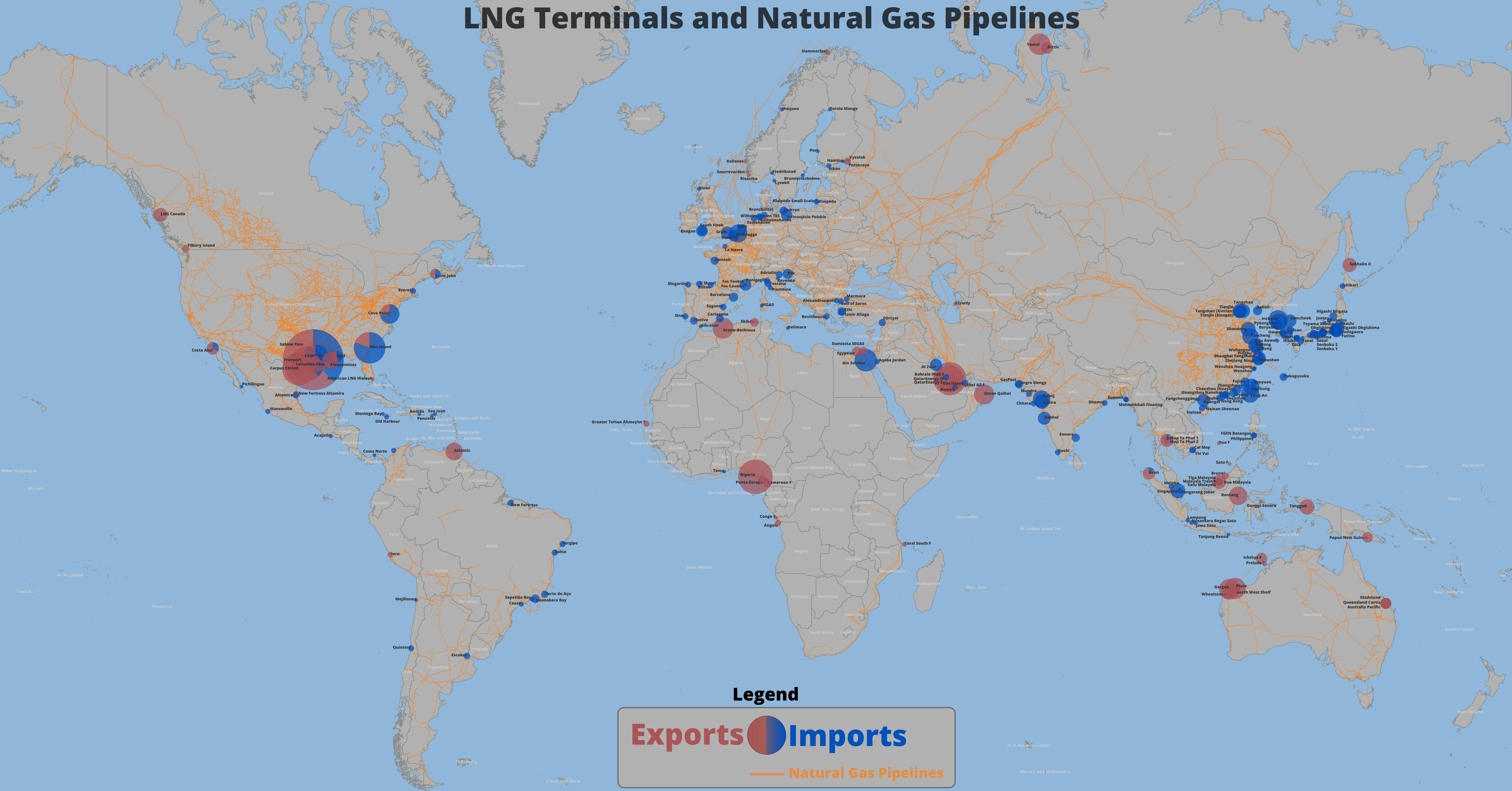
Natural gas pipelines and LNG terminals

Liquefied natural gas (LNG) is the liquefied form of natural gas, which has a much smaller volume than natural gas in its gaseous form. This liquefied condition is used to facilitate the carriage of natural gas over long distances, often by sea, in specialized tanks.

LNG port terminals are purpose-built port terminals designed to accommodate large LNG carrier ships designed to load, carry and unload LNG. These LNG terminals are located adjacent to a gas liquefaction and storage plant (export), or to a gas regasification and storage plant (import), which are themselves connected to gas pipelines connected to on-shore or off-shore gas fields (export) or to storage and distribution plants (import).

== Existing liquefaction terminals ==
=== Africa ===
Plant name	Location	Country	Startup date	Capacity (10^{6} tonnes/a)	Corporation
Arzew (CAMEL) GL4Z Trains 1–3		Algeria	1964	0.3 × 3 = 0.9	Sonatrach. Shutdown since April 2010.
Arzew GL1Z Trains 1–6		Algeria	1978	1.3 × 6 = 7.8	Sonatrach
Arzew GL2Z Trains 1–6		Algeria	1981	1.4 × 6 = 8.4	Sonatrach
Arzew GL3Z Train 1		Algeria	2013	4.7	Sonatrach
Skikda GL K Phase 1 & 2 Trains 1–6		Algeria	1972–1981	Total 6.0	Sonatrach
Skikda GL1k Skikda Train 1		Algeria	2013	4.5	Sonatrach
EG LNG	Malabo, Bioko Island	Equatorial Guinea			
SEGAS LNG	Damietta	Egypt	2004	5.5	SEGAS LNG
ELNG IDCO LNG		Egypt			
Nigeria LNG	Bonny	Nigeria	1999	Total 22	NNPC Limited
Angola LNG	Soyo	Angola	2013	5.2	
Hilli Episeyo FLNG		Cameroon	2018	2.5	
Coral FLNG	Cabo Delgado Province	Mozambique	2022		ENI
Gimi FLNG		Senegal / Mauritania	2025	2.5	

=== Asia ===
- Malaysia LNG, Tanjung Kidurong, Bintulu, Malaysia
- Brunei LNG, Lumut, Brunei
- Arun, Indonesia
- Bangladesh
- Badak NGL, Indonesia
- Tangguh, Indonesia
- Donggi Senoro LNG, Central Sulawesi, Indonesia
- RGTSU, Sungai Udang, Melaka, Malaysia

=== Russia ===
- Sakhalin LNG, Sakhalin, Russia – (Sakhalin Energy Investment Company Ltd.)
- on the Yamal Peninsula, in Russia:
  - Yamal LNG, in Sabetta
  - Arctic LNG 2
- Vysotsk LNG, near the Nord Stream 1 compressor station there. It started operation on two trains in September 2022.

=== Middle East ===
- ADGAS
- Oman LNG
- Qalhat LNG, Oman
- Qatar LNG total production will increase from 77 million tonnes per annum(mtpa) in 2021(21% export market share) to 110 mtpa in 2026, then 126 mtpa in 2027.
  - QatarEnergy LNG Ras Laffan LNG plant, Ras Laffan, Qatar, see on a map
- ADGAS Plant, Das Island, Abu Dhabi, United Arab Emirates
- Yemen LNG (Total), Balhaf, Yemen

=== South America ===
- Peru LNG, Pampa Melchorita, Peru
- Tango FLNG, Argentina, 2019
- Atlantic LNG, Trinidad and Tobago

=== Australia ===
#	Plant name	Location	State	Number of trains	Capacity (mtpa)	Joint venture	Operated by
1	QLNG: Queensland Curtis LNG	Curtis Island	Queensland	2	8.5	JV	BG Group
2	GLNG: Gladstone LNG	Curtis Island	Queensland	2	7.8	JV	Santos Limited
3	APLNG: Australia Pacific LNG	Curtis Island	Queensland	2	9.0	ConocoPhillips and Origin Energy	Origin Energy
4	Karratha Gas Plant	Karratha	Western Australia	5	16.3	North West Shelf Venture	Woodside Energy
5	Pluto LNG	Karratha	Western Australia	1	4.3	JV	Woodside Energy
6	Wheatstone LNG	Barrow Island	Western Australia	2	8.9	JV	Chevron Corporation
7	Gorgon LNG	Barrow Island	Western Australia	3	15.6	JV	Chevron Corporation
8	Ichthys	Darwin	Northern Territory	2	8.4	JV	INPEX
9	DLNG : Darwin LNG	Darwin	Northern Territory	2	3.7	JV	Santos Limited
10	Prelude FLNG	Timor Sea	Australia	3	3.6	JV	Shell

=== Europe ===
- Hammerfest LNG, liquifies gas from the Snøhvit undersea field. Located at Hammerfest, Norway. Operated by Equinor.
- Risavika Liquefaction Plant, Risavika, Sola Municipality, Norway. Operated by North Sea Midstream Partners Limited (NSMP). Liquifies both natural gas and biogas by pipeline from Kårstø.

=== North America ===
Canada:

- LNG Canada, Kitimat, British Columbia

Mexico:

- Costa Azul LNG near Ensenada, Baja California
- Solensa (small scale) near Monterrey

United States:

- Kenai LNG, Nikiski, Alaska
- Cheniere Energy Sabine Pass terminal, Louisiana
- Cove Point LNG, Maryland terminal
- Cheniere Energy Corpus Christi terminal, Texas
- Freeport LNG terminal, Quintana Island, Texas
- Cameron LNG, Hackberry, Louisiana
- Southern LNG, Elba Island, Georgia

Under construction:

- Plaquemines
- Corpus Christie Stage III
- Golden Pass
- Rio Grande
- Port Arthur
- Woodfibre LNG
- Cedar LNG
- Fast LNG Altamira FLNG2
- Energia Costa Azul

== Existing regasification terminals ==
=== Argentina ===
- Bahia Blanca Gasport, YPF, 2008
- GNL Escobar, ENARSA/YPF, 2011

=== Bangladesh ===
- Moheshkhali floating LNG terminal, Excelerate Energy, 2018
- Summit LNG, Summit Corporation, 2019

=== Belgium ===
- Zeebrugge LNG terminal, in Zeebrugge. Operated by Fluxys. Entered service in 1987, total storage capacity of 560,000 m^{3}, 2 jetties and a regasification capacity of 9,000,000,000 m^{3} per year.

=== Brazil ===
- Pecém, State of Ceará
- Bahia LNG Regasification Terminal, Bay of All Saints, State of Bahia
- Guanabara Bay, State of Rio de Janeiro
- TPP Porto de Sergipe I, Barra dos Coqueiros, State of Sergipe. [Private Terminal]

=== Canada ===
- Saint John LNG, Saint John, New Brunswick

=== Chile ===
- GNL, Quintero
- GNL, Mejillones

=== China ===
- Dapeng LNG Terminal, Shenzhen, Guangdong province
- Fujian LNG Terminal, Putian, Fujian province
- Shanghai LNG Terminal, Yangshan Port, Shanghai
- Dalian LNG Terminal, Dalian, Liaoning province
- Ningbo LNG Terminal, Ningbo, Zhejiang province
- Rudong LNG Terminal, Nantong, Jiangsu province
- Qidong LNG Terminal, Qidong, Jiangsu province
- Tangshan LNG Terminal, Caofeidian, Hebei province
- Tianjin LNG Terminal, Binhai New Area, Tianjin
- Tianjin LNG Terminal, Nangang Industrial Zone, Tianjin
- Zhuhai LNG Terminal, Zhuhai, Guangdong province
- Qingdao LNG Terminal, Jiaonan, Shandong province
- Shenzhen LNG Terminal, Shenzhen, Guangdong province
- Hainan LNG Terminal, Yangpu Economic Development Zone, Hainan
- Guangxi LNG Terminal, Beihai, Guangxi
- Zhoushan LNG Terminal, Zhoushan, Zhejiang province
- Dongguan LNG Terminal, Dongguan, Guangdong province
- Yuedong LNG Terminal, Jieyang, Guangdong province

=== Colombia ===
- Sociedad Portuaria El Cayao LNG (SPEC), Cartagena de Indias.

=== Croatia ===
- Krk LNG terminal

=== Dominican Republic ===
- AES-Andres LNG Terminal

=== Finland ===
- Inkoo LNG terminal, Finland's first marine LNG shipping terminal, situated near Ingå, Finland on the Gulf of Finland. Became operational in January 2023, ten months after the cutoff of Russian pipeline gas in the aftermath of the 2022 Russian invasion of Ukraine. Can also be used to supply gas to the Baltic countries as well in the future via Balticconnector.
- Hamina, Hamina LNG terminal. Joint venture of Haminan Energia Oy, Alexela and Wärtsilä. The terminal offers truck loading and LNG ship bunkering as well as regasification for both local industry and the Finnish national gas grid. Full open market access begins on 1. October 2022.
- Pori, LNG terminal. Owner a Gasum company Skangas Oy (LNG regasification & LNG distribution)
- Manga LNG terminal, Röyttä, Tornio. Owners Outokumpu Oyj, SSAB Oy, Skangas Oy and EPV Energia Oy (LNG regasification & LNG distribution)

=== France ===
- LNG Terminal Fos-Cavaou in Fos-sur-Mer near Marseille. Operated by Fosmax LNG, a subsidiary of Elengy, itself a subsidiary of Engie. Entered service in 2010, total storage capacity of 330,000 m^{3}, 1 jetty, and a regasification capacity of 8,250,000,000 m^{3} per year.
- LNG Terminal Fos-Tonkin in Fos-sur-Mer near Marseille. Operated by Elengy, a subsidiary of Engie. Entered service in 1972, total storage capacity of 150,000 m^{3}, 1 jetty and a regasification capacity of 5,500,000,000 m^{3} per year.
- LNG Terminal Loon-Plage in Loon-Plage, near Dunkirk. Founded by Électricité de France (65%), Fluxys (25%) and Total S.A. (10%), and then changed in 2018 with the terminal being owned and operated by Dunkerque LNG, a company 61% owned by a consortium made up of Belgium gas infrastructure group Fluxys, AXA Investment Managers-Real Assets, and Crédit Agricole Assurances, and 39% owned by a consortium of Korean investors led by IPM Group in cooperation with Samsung Asset Management. Entered service in 2017, total storage capacity of 600,000 m^{3}, 2 jetties, and a regasification capacity of 13,000,000,000 m^{3} per year.
- LNG Terminal Montoir-de-Bretagne, in Montoir-de-Bretagne near Nantes. Operated by Elengy, a subsidiary of Engie. Entered service in 1980, total storage capacity of 360,000 m^{3}, 2 jetties, and a regasification capacity of 10,000,000,000 m^{3} per year.

=== Germany ===
- Lubmin LNG terminals
- Wilhelmshaven LNG terminal

=== Greece ===
- Revithoussa LNG Terminal, on Revithoussa island near Athens. Operated by DESFA, a subsidiary of DEPA. Entered service in 1999, total storage capacity of 225,000 m^{3}, 1 jetty, and a regasification capacity of 12,200,000,000 m^{3} per year.

=== India ===
- Bhavnagar CNG Terminal, world's first CNG terminal
- Chennai LNG Terminal
- Konkan LNG Private Limited, Dabhol, Maharashtra, 5 million tonnes per year and 12 million tonnes per year by 2025.
- Dahej Terminal, Petronet LNG Ltd, Gujarat – 15 million tonnes per year and 17.5 million tonnes per year by 2018 end.
- Dhamra LNG Terminal
- Ennore LNG Terminal
- Krishnapatnam FSRU
- GAIL Kakinada FSRU
- Hazira Terminal, Shell Ltd, Gujarat – 5 million tonnes per year
- Kochi Terminal, Petronet LNG Ltd. – 5 million tonnes per year
- Mundra Terminal, GSPC LNG Ltd. – 5 million tonnes per year
- (Chennai) Terminal, INDIAN OIL LNG(Joint venture of Indian Oil Corporation) – 5 million tonnes per year https://www.indianoillng.com/
- Jaigarh LNG Terminal, First FSRU Terminal, H-Energy H-Energy
- Swan Energy LNG Terminal, Bhankodar, Gujarat
- Chhara LNG Terminal (HPLNG) – 5 mmtpa (https://www.hplng.in/index)
- Dhamra LNG Terminal (DLTPL, Adani-Total)

=== Israel ===
- Hadera Deepwater LNG Terminal, INGL, 2013

=== Italy ===
- Adriatic LNG Terminal, offshore near Rovigo. Operated by ExxonMobil (70,7%), QatarEnergy (22%), Snam (7,3%). Entered service in 2009, total storage capacity of 250,000 m^{3}, 1 jetty, and a regasification capacity of 9,000,000,000 m^{3} per year.
- Panigaglia LNG Terminal, near La Spezia. Operated by GNL Italia, a subsidiary of Snam. Entered service in 1971, total storage capacity of 100,000 m^{3}, 1 jetty, and a regasification capacity of 3,864,000,000 m^{3} per year.
- Toscana LNG Terminal, offshore near Livorno. Operated by OLT Offshore (a joint venture of Iren (company) (49.07%), Uniper (48.24%), and Golar LNG (2.69%)). Entered service in 2013, total storage capacity of 137,100 m^{3}, 1 jetty, and an authorized regasification capacity of 3,750,000,000 m^{3} per year.

=== Japan ===
- Tōhoku region and Hokkaido region
  - Shin Minato LNG terminal, Sendai Gas, 0.08M m^{3}, opened 1997
  - Hachinohe LNG terminal (Re-shipment), Nippon Oil, 0.04M m^{3}, open 2006
  - Hakodate LNG terminal (Re-shipment), open 2006
- Chūbu region
  - Higashi Niigata LNG terminal, Tohoku Electric, 0.72M m^{3}, open 1984
  - Sodeshi LNG terminal, Shimizu LNG and Shizuoka Gas, 0.177M m^{3}, open 1996
  - Chita Kyodo LNG terminal, Chubu Electric and Toho Gas, 0.3M m^{3}, open 1977
  - Chita LNG terminal, Chita LNG, Chubu Electric and Toho Gas, 0.64M m^{3}, open 1983
  - Yokkaichi LNG Centre, Toho Gas, 0.32M m^{3}, open 1987
  - Yokkaichi Works LNG terminal, Chubu Electric, 0.16M m^{3}, open 1991
  - Kawagoe LNG terminal, Chubu Electric, 0.48M m^{3}, open 1997
  - Chita Midorihama LNG terminal, Toho Gas, 0.2M m^{3}, open 2001
  - Joetsu LNG terminal, Chubu Electric, 0.54M m^{3}, open 2011
  - Naoetsu LNG terminal, Inpex, 0.36M m^{3}, open 2013
- Kantō region
  - Futtsu LNG terminal, Tokyo Electric, 1.11M m^{3}, open 1985
  - Sodegaura LNG terminal, Tokyo Electric and Tokyo Gas, 2.66M m^{3}, open 1973
  - Higashi Ohgishima LNG terminal, Tokyo Electric, 0.54M m^{3}, open 1984
  - Ohgishima LNG terminal, Tokyo Gas, 0.6M m^{3}, open 1998
  - Negishi LNG terminal, Tokyo Electric and Tokyo Gas, 1.25M m^{3}, open 1969
- Kansai region
  - Senboku 1 LNG terminal, Osaka Gas, 0.18M m^{3}, open 1972
  - Senboku 2 LNG terminal, Osaka Gas, 1.51M m^{3}, open 1972
  - Himeji LNG terminal, Osaka Gas, 0.52M m^{3}, open 1977
  - Himeji Joint LNG terminal, Osaka Gas and Kansai Electric, 1.44M m^{3}, open 1984
  - Sakai LNG terminal, Sakai LNG and Kansai Electric and Iwatani Corporation and Cosmo Oil, 0.56M m^{3}, open 2010
- Shikoku region
  - Sakaide LNG terminal, Shikoku Electric Power, 0.18M m^{3}, open 2010
- Chūgoku region
  - Hatsukaichi LNG terminal, Hiroshima Gas, 0.17M m^{3}, 1996
  - Yanai LNG terminal, Chugoku Electric Power, 0.48M m^{3}, 1990
  - Mizushima LNG terminal, Mizushima LNG and Chugoku Electric Power and Nippon Oil, 0.16M m^{3}, 2006
- Kyūshū region and Okinawa
  - Ōita LNG terminal, Oita LNG and Kyushu Electric Power and Kyushu Oil and Oita Gas, 0.46M m^{3}, 1990
  - Tobata LNG terminal, Kitakyushu LNG and Kyushu Electric Power and Nippon Steel, 0.48M m^{3}, 1997
  - Fukuoka LNG terminal, Seibu Gas, 0.07M m^{3}, 1993
  - Kagoshima LNG terminal, Kagoshima Gas, 0.036M m^{3}, 1996
  - Nagasaki LNG terminal, Seibu Gas, 0.035M m^{3}, 2003
  - Nakagusuku LNG terminal, Okinawa Electric Power, 0.7M m^{3}, due to open 2010

=== Kuwait ===
- Mina Al-Ahmadi Gasport, 2009 (KNPC)

=== Lithuania ===
- Klaipėda LNG Terminal offshore Klaipėda. Operated by KN Energies. Entered service in 2014, total storage capacity of 170,000 m^{3}, 1 jetty, and a gasification capacity of 3,752,766,480 m^{3}.

=== Mexico ===
- Costa Azul LNG 14 miles (23 km) north of Ensenada, Mexico, Sempra Energy, opened May 2008, first one on West Coast of North America.
- Altamira LNG near Tampico, Mexico, Shell, opened August 2006
- Manzanillo LNG in Manzanillo, Colima, Mexico, Mitsui + Korea Gas + Samsung, opened 2011
- Solensa LNG (Small Scale), near Monterrey, Mexico

=== Netherlands ===
- Gate terminal, Rotterdam, opened September 2011
- Eemshaven LNG Terminal (EemsEnergyTerminal). Floating, operated by Gasunie, opened September 2022

=== Norway ===
- Mosjøen LNG-terminal, Mosjøen. Operated by Gasnor AS. Provides LNG delivery by truck, to augment production of liquid biogas from waste.
- Øra LNG-terminal, Fredrikstad. Operated by Gasum Oy. Supplies pipeline natural gas to local industrial area, as well as LNG bunkering for vessels and LNG delivery by truck.
- Ålesund LNG-terminal, Bingsa, Ålesund. Operated by Gasum Oy. Supplies pipeline gas to local industry and LNG delivery by truck. Opened in 2010.

=== Pakistan ===
- Engro Enengy Terminal Private Limited (EETPL), Port Qasim, Karachi
- Pakistan GasPort Consortium Limited (PGPC)—the wholly owned subsidiary of Pakistan GasPort Limited (PGPL)—owns and operates the 750mmscfd LNG import terminal at Mazhar Point, Port Qasim, Karachi.

=== Poland ===
- Świnoujście LNG terminal, Świnoujście (Wolin Island)

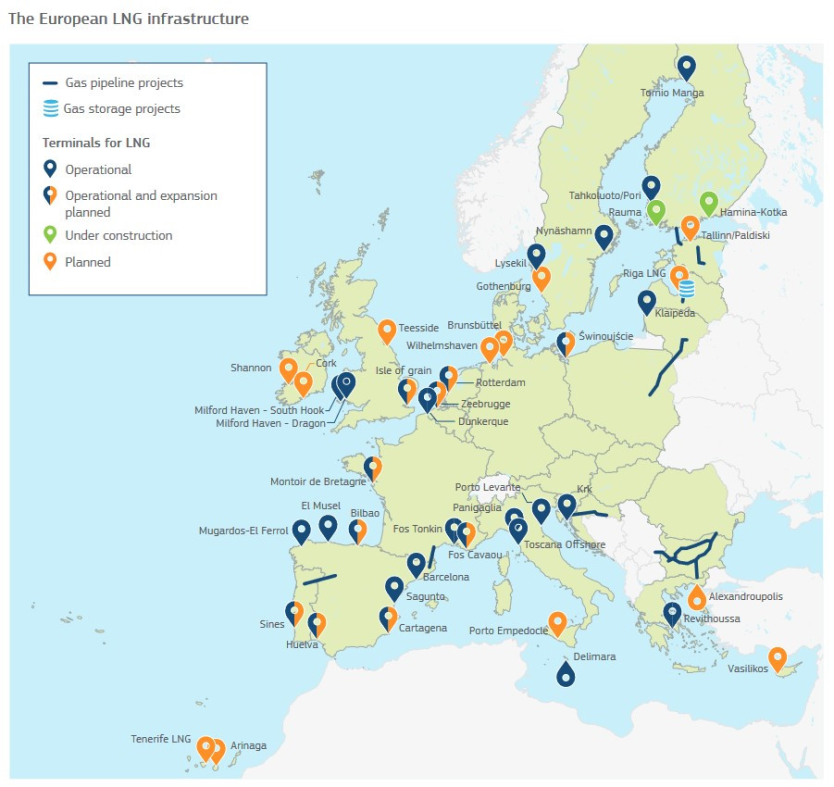
Map of LNG terminals in Europe, operational and under construction/planned

=== Portugal ===
- Sines LNG Terminal, REN

=== Singapore ===
- Singapore LNG Terminal. Commenced commercial operation on Q2 2013

=== South Korea ===
- Pyeongtaek, KOGAS
- Incheon, KOGAS
- Tongyeong, KOGAS
- Samcheok, KOGAS
- Jejudo, KOGAS
- Gwangyang, POSCO
- Boryeong, GS Energy and SK E&S

=== Spain ===
- Barcelona (Enagás)
- Bahía de Bizkaia Gas (BBG) LNG terminal, Bilbao (consortium including Enagás and Ente Vasco de la Energia), see on a map
- Huelva (Enagás), see on a map
- Sagunto LNG terminal (Saggas), Valencia (consortium including Enagás, Osaka Gas and Oman Oil Holdings)
- Cartagena (Enagás), see on a map
- Mugardos Ferrol Harbour (Reganosa, starting in 2007)
- El Musel LNG terminal, Gijón (Enagás, started in 2023)

=== Sweden ===
- Lysekil LNG terminal, Lysekil. Joint venture by Gasum Oy and Preem. Delivers LNG by truck as well as pipeline gas to Preem's oil refinery. Opened in 2014.
- Nynäshamn LNG, Brunnviksholmen, Nynäshamn. Operated by Gasum Oy. Delivers LNG by truck and LNG bunker, as well as pipeline gas to local industrial grid. Operation started in 2011 and partly opened to open market in 2021.

=== Taiwan ===
- Guantang LNG Terminal, Taoyuan, Taiwan (planning)
- Taichung LNG Terminal, Taichung, Taiwan
- Yongan LNG Terminal, Kaohsiung, Taiwan

=== Thailand ===
- Map Ta Phut LNG Terminal Phase#1: 2 x 160,000 m^{3} for Tanks Capacity, PTT and EGAT Phase#2: extra tanks (same size). Phase#1 Completed & Commenced Commercial Operation Date in 2011.(First commissioning by LNG vessel in May 2011. 5 million tonnes per year, additional 5 million tonnes per year by 2017 under construction)

=== Turkey ===
- Marmara Ereğlisi LNG Storage Facility, Marmara Ereğlisi, BOTAŞ
- Egegaz Aliağa LNG Storage Facility, Aliağa, Egegaz
- Etki terminal, FSRU TURQUOISE P , Aliağa, Pardus Energy
- Botaş Dörtyol LNG Storage Facility, Dörtyol, BOTAŞ
- Botaş Saros FSRU Terminal, Gulf of Saros, BOTAŞ, under construction as of 2022

=== Vietnam ===
- Thi Vai Terminal – Ba Ria Vung Tau Province (Updated by handsome guy)

=== United Arab Emirates (UAE) ===
- Jebel Ali LNG Import Terminal, Dubai, started 2010 (DUSUP)
- Ruwais LNG Import Terminal, Abu Dhabi, 2016 (ADNOC)

=== United Kingdom ===
- South Hook LNG, Milford Haven, South Wales
- Dragon LNG terminal, Milford Haven, South Wales
- Grain LNG, Isle of Grain, Kent

=== United States and Puerto Rico ===
The following LNG off-loading and regasification terminals are located in the United States and Gulf of Mexico:

- Dominion Cove Point LNG, LP, Lusby, Maryland – (Dominion Resources)
- Southern LNG, Elba Island, Georgia, – (Kinder Morgan)
- Trunkline LNG, Lake Charles, Louisiana – (Trunkline LNG Company, LLC)
- EcoEléctrica, Punta Guyanilla, Puerto Rico
- Golden Pass LNG, rural Jefferson County, Texas – (Golden Pass LNG)
- Sabine Pass LNG, rural Cameron Parish, Louisiana – (Cheniere Energy, Inc.)

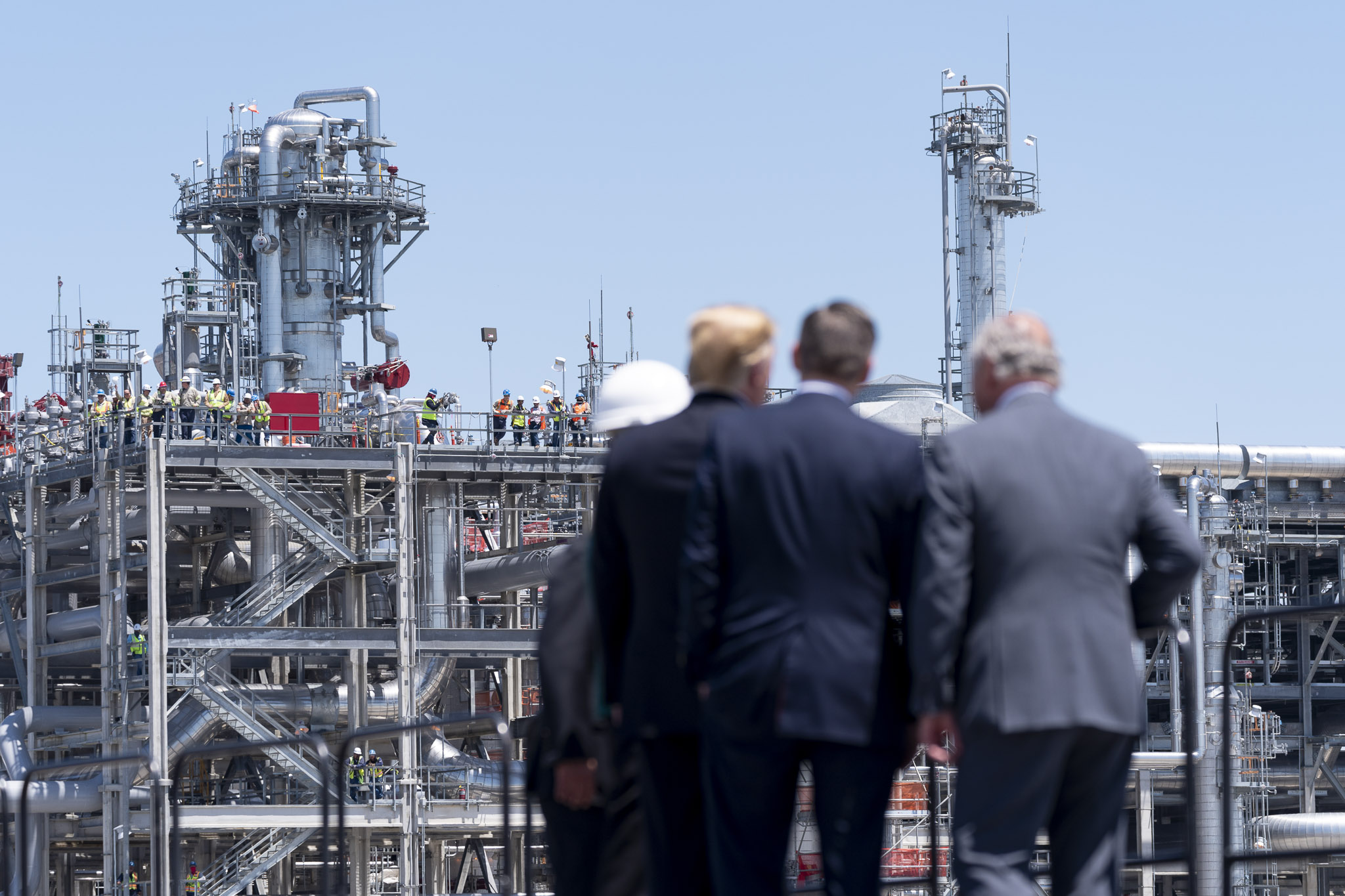
Cameron LNG Export Terminal in Louisiana, May 2019

- Cameron LNG, rural Cameron Parish, Louisiana – (Sempra Energy)
- Freeport LNG, Freeport, Texas – (Freeport LNG Development, LP)
- Everett Marine Terminal, Everett, Massachusetts – (Exelon Corporation)
- Gulf LNG, Pascagoula, Mississippi – (Kinder Morgan)
- Gulf Gateway Deepwater Port, Gulf of Mexico – (Excelerate Energy LP) (decommissioned)
- Northeast Gateway Deepwater Port, offshore from Gloucester, Massachusetts,(Excelerate Energy LP)
- Neptune LNG, offshore from Gloucester, Massachusetts,(GDf Suez)

== Proposed liquefaction terminals ==
=== Asia Pacific ===
==== China ====
- Jingbian Terminal, Yulin, Shaanxi Province – (China Natural Gas 100%) – to be completed December 2009

==== Papua New Guinea ====
- PNG LNG, Port Moresby, Papua New Guinea – (estimated 2013) – (ExxonMobil 41.6%, Oil Search 34.1%, Santos 17.7%, AGL 3.6%, Nippon Oil 1.8% and Mineral Resource Development Corporation 1.2%)

==== Russia (Asia) ====
- Yamal LNG, Yamal, Russia

In March 2021 the Russian Government authorised a long-term programme to develop three more LNG plants (plus five more potential plants):

- Arctic LNG-2 plant (East of Yamal, Novatek) – Completion expected in 2023–2025
- Arctic LNG-1 plant (Novatek) – Completion expected after 2027
- Yakutsk LNG plant (Yatek) – Completion expected in 2026–2027

=== North America ===
==== Canada ====
- Energie Saguenay, Quebec
- Goldboro LNG, Goldboro, Nova Scotia
- Kitimat LNG, Kitimat, British Columbia
- Cedar LNG (Proposed), floating facility, Kitimat, British Columbia
- LNG Canada, Kitimat, British Columbia
- Woodfibre LNG, Woodfibre, British Columbia

==== United States ====
The United States has had a massive shift in LNG terminal planning and construction starting in 2010–2011 due to a rapid increase in US domestic natural gas supply with the widespread adoption of horizontal drilling, combined with hydraulic fracturing petroleum recovery technology. Many brand-new LNG import terminals are planning or have begun addition of liquefaction facilities to operate as export terminals.

On 21 November 2019, U.S. regulators approved permits for three new liquified natural gas export terminals in the Rio Grande Valley in Texas. The Federal Energy Regulatory Commission approved permits for Rio Grande LNG, Annova LNG and Texas LNG with each of the three companies intending to build their LNG plant and terminal at the Port of Brownsville. One month after approval, the Sierra Club and other environmental groups asked the FERC to reconsider the permits, saying the agency failed to adequately consider environmental impacts. However, the Annova LNG project was cancelled in March 2021.

The following six projects are in various stages of planning according to the US Federal regulatory authority as of May 2020.

Operational

- Venture Global LNG, Calcasieu Pass, Louisiana.

Pending Applications

- Commonwealth LNG, Cameron Parish, Louisiana
- Sempra–Port Arthur LNG, Trains 3 & 4, Port Arthur, Texas

Projects in Pre-Filing

- Port Fourchon LNG, Lafourche Parish, Louisiana
- Galveston Bay LNG, Galveston Bay, Texas
- Pointe LNG, Plaquemines Parish, Louisiana
- Delta LNG, Plaquemines Parish, Louisiana

=== South America ===
==== Peru ====
- Peru LNG, Pampa Melchorita, Cañete, Peru

=== Australia ===
- Barrow Island – Chevron Corporation proposes to build an LNG facility and loading terminal on Barrow Island, Western Australia, as part of its Gorgon Project. (COMPLETED 2016)
- Australia Pacific LNG – Origin Energy, ConocoPhillips and Sinopec – Curtis Island, Queensland.
- Arrow LNG – Arrow Energy – Curtis Island, Queensland.
- Gladstone LNG – Santos, Petronas, Total and KOGAS – Curtis Island, Queensland.
- Wheatstone LNG, is a liquefied natural gas plant operating in the Ashburton North Strategic Industrial Area, which is located 12 kilometres (7.5 mi) west of Onslow, Western Australia. The project is operated by Chevron Australia Pty. Ltd. (COMPLETED 2019)

=== Europe ===
==== Cyprus ====
- Vasiliko LNG, Vasiliko, Cyprus

==== Russia (Europe) ====
- Baltic LNG at Ust-Luga (Gazprom and RusGazDobycha)
- Shtokmann LNG, Murmansk, Russia

== Proposed regasification terminals ==
=== Australia ===
- AGL Gas Import Jetty, Crib Point

=== Bangladesh ===
- Matarbari LNG Terminal, Maheshkhali

=== Chile ===
- GNL Mejillones (In operation)
- GNL Quintero (In operation)
- GNL Penco

=== Estonia ===
- Paldiski LNG (developed by Alexela)

=== France ===
- Fos-Faster LNG terminal, planned start of commercial operation 2019

=== Germany ===
- Stade LNG Terminal
- Brunsbüttel LNG Terminal, to be operated by a joint venture consisting of Gasunie, Oiltanking and Vopak. Final decision expected in 2018.
- Wilhelmshaven LNG terminal

=== Greece ===
- Alexandroupolis INGS, planned with total storage capacity of 170,000 m3, and a regasification capacity of 6,100,000,000 m3 per year. Operational as of October 1st, 2024
- Crete LNG Terminal, planned
- Kavala LNG Terminal, planned

=== Hong Kong ===
- An FSRU (floating storage regasification unit) in the waters to the east of the Soko Islands

=== India ===
- Pipavav LNG Terminal (APM Terminals)
- Kakinada LNG Terminal owned by GAIL, GDF SUEZ and Shell. 5 mt/year.
- Kakinada LNG Terminal owned by VGS Cavallo, 3.6 mt/year.
- Kakinada LNG Terminal owned by H-Energy (GMR), 1.75 mt/year.
- Vizag LNG Terminal owned by Petronet LNG, 10 mt/year.

=== Indonesia ===
- East Java by 2011, Pertamina
- West Java by 2011, Pertamina Gas Negara (PGN) and Pertamina
- North Sumatra by 2011 by PGN

The country also has liquefaction terminals in more remote areas for export, and imports from the Middle East in areas with dense population.

=== Ireland ===
- Shannon LNG Terminal. Shannon LNG

=== Italy ===
- Porto Empedocle LNG Terminal

=== Japan ===
- Hitachi LNG Terminal, Tokyo Gas, 2017 possible start date.

=== Latvia ===
- A terminal in Riga

=== Mexico ===
- TGNL – Manzanillo, Colima scheduled to open 2011

=== Myanmar ===
- A terminal in Kanbauk in Tanintharyi Region is expected to open in the middle of 2020, through JV of French company Total and Germany's Siemens for the 1,230MW capacity in 48 months
- A terminal in Mee Laung Gyaing in Ayeyarwady Region, is a US$2.5 Billion JV of China's Zhefu and local Myanmar company Supreme Group will undertake a 1,390MW LNG project, with the first phase to be completed in 36 months and full capacity ready in 42 months
- A terminal in Ahlone in Yangon Region a Thailand company TTCL – better known as Toyo Thai to will build a 356MW LNG plant. This is expected to be completed in 28 months
- A terminal in Kyaukphyu in Rakhine State a JV of China's Sinohydro and Myanmar Local company Supreme Group will build another 135MW combined-cycle gas turbine project which is expected to be completed in 28 months with the Ahlone terminal

=== Netherlands ===
- LionGas Terminal, Europoort, Rotterdam. Canceled.

=== Pakistan ===
- Energas LNG Terminal (Pvt) Limited Port Qasim, Karachi
- Tabeer Energy (Pvt) Limited (TEPL) Port Qasim, Karachi

=== Philippines ===
- A First Gen LNG Terminal, Batangas City, Philippines
- A terminal in Sulu Southwestern Philippines in the Island of Mindanao
- A terminal in Cebu central Philippines of Phinma Petroleum and Geothermal (PPG), floating storage and regasification unit (FSRU) have already been completed and the entire project is expected to be completed in 2022
- Another US$1.7 billion LNG Terminal to power Luzon to be built by South Korea's SK E&S with signed MOU with he Korean Ministry of Trade, Industry and Energy and the Philippines Department of Energy signed during the visit of the Philippine President Rodrigo Duterte in South Korea

=== Russia ===
Kaliningrad LNG Terminal

=== South Korea ===
North East Asia LNG Hub Terminal

=== Thailand ===
- Map Ta Phut LNG Terminal/ Project expansion for Phase 2.

=== Ukraine ===
- Proposed terminal near Odesa, on 26 November 2012 the Ukrainian government and Unión Fenosa (were believed to have) signed an agreement on its building but Unión Fenosa denies this and it claimed on 28 November 2012 "nor are we leading any consortium to develop such a terminal ... nor are we studying anything along these lines". The terminal was due to start working at a capacity of 5 billion cubic meters a year by 2016.

== See also ==
- CNOOC § LNG terminals
- List of natural gas pipelines
