= Atlanta Gas Light =

Natural gas wholesale company

- Company type: Subsidiary
- Industry: Utilities
- Founded: 1856; 170 years ago
- Headquarters: Atlanta, Georgia
- Parent: Southern Company
- Website: atlantagaslight.com

Atlanta Gas Light Company (AGLC), commonly still known as Atlanta Gas Light (AGL), is the largest natural gas wholesaler in the Southeast U.S., and is the leading subsidiary of parent company Southern Company Gas. It was founded in 1856 and is headquartered in Atlanta, as is Southern Company Gas. It provides distribution and metering to more than 1.6 million residential, commercial, and industrial customers in 243 communities throughout the state of Georgia.

The company was originally the direct provider of natural gas, becoming a regulated monopoly under the Georgia Public Service Commission (PSC). Under Governor Zell Miller, the Georgia General Assembly forced it to divide into retail and wholesale divisions and compete with other retailers, starting in 1998. AGL's retail division is Georgia Natural Gas (GNG), and is one of around a dozen remaining resellers. The wholesale division was known as Atlanta Gas Light Services (AGLS) for some time.

In late September 2007, the Georgia Public Service Commission voted to allow AGL to construct a pipeline from the shipping terminal at Elba Island to connect with other pipelines across the state, via a pipeline that already runs across the mid-state. This allows liquid natural gas (LNG) to be pumped into the system, providing a backup source in case hurricanes or other problems interrupt service from Louisiana.

In August 2015, it was announced that the Southern Company would purchase AGL Resources, creating an energy supply monopoly in the state since that company also owns Georgia Power, the electricity company for most of the state.

== Natural gas certified marketers ==
Atlanta Gas Light is a wholesaler for many natural gas marketers throughout the Atlanta metro area, including:

- Colonial Energy
- Constellation Energy
- FireSide Natural Gas
- Fuel Georgia
- Gas South
- Georgia Natural Gas
- Infinite Energy
- Just Energy
- Kratos Gas & Power, LLC
- Mansfield Power & Gas
- SCANA Energy
- Stream Energy
- Town Square Energy
- True Natural Gas
- Walton EMC Natural Gas
- Xoom Energy
