= Perpetual energy =

Perpetual energy may refer to:

- Perpetual motion, the property of an imaginary device that, once started, continues to move forever with no input of external energy
- Renewable energy, energy collected from resources that are naturally replenished on a human timescale
- Perpetual Energy Inc, a Canadian company owned by Clay Riddell
- Perpetual Energies, a 1987 studio album by Ray Buttigieg
- "Perpetual Energy" (Cow and Chicken), an episode of Cow and Chicken

== See also ==
- Infinite energy (disambiguation)
- Free energy (disambiguation)
