= Adriatic LNG terminal =

Liquid natural gas offshore terminal in the Adriatic Sea

Coordinates: 45°05′30″N 12°35′10″E

The Adriatic LNG terminal is a liquid natural gas offshore terminal, operated by the Italian company Terminale GNL Adriatico Srl, also known as Adriatic LNG. Located in the northern Adriatic 9 miles (14 km) offshore of Porto Levante, Porto Viro, near Rovigo, Italy, it is the world's first offshore gravity-based structure LNG regasification terminal. Adriatic LNG was established in 2005, and is controlled by VTTI (70%) and Snam (30%). The terminal was created entirely with private assets and has been operational since 2009.

== Construction ==
The terminal facility was built in Campamento, parish of San Roque, Spain, then towed to Porto Levante, Italy. Construction started in October 2003 and finished in August 2008. The LNG tanks "rings" were constructed in South Korea and they were assembled in Spain. The pipeline that connects to the terminal is located south of the Levante Po River mouth near Scanno Cavallari.

== Moving ==
After construction was completed in Campamento, the rig was towed by four tugboats to its current location off the coast of Rovigo. The flotilla traveled the 1,700 nautical miles (3,100 km; 2,000 mi) in 16 days to reach the site. It traveled at an average speed of 4.4 knots (8.1 km/h; 5.1 mph). When it arrived, the terminal was weighted down by water to ensure it was permanently positioned on the seabed.

== Operations ==
Operations started in the mid of 2009. It received its first cargo on 11 August 2009. When fully operational, it stores and regasifies 8 billion cubic metres (280 billion cubic feet) of natural gas per year, enough to meet 10% of Italy's natural gas needs. The terminal receives a LNG carrier every three days from Qatar. The gas is then regasified and sent to the Italian gas network by a pipeline from the terminal to the coast.
