= Guantang LNG Terminal =

Upcoming LNG terminal in Guanyin, Taoyuan City, Taiwan

- 觀塘液化天然氣接收站
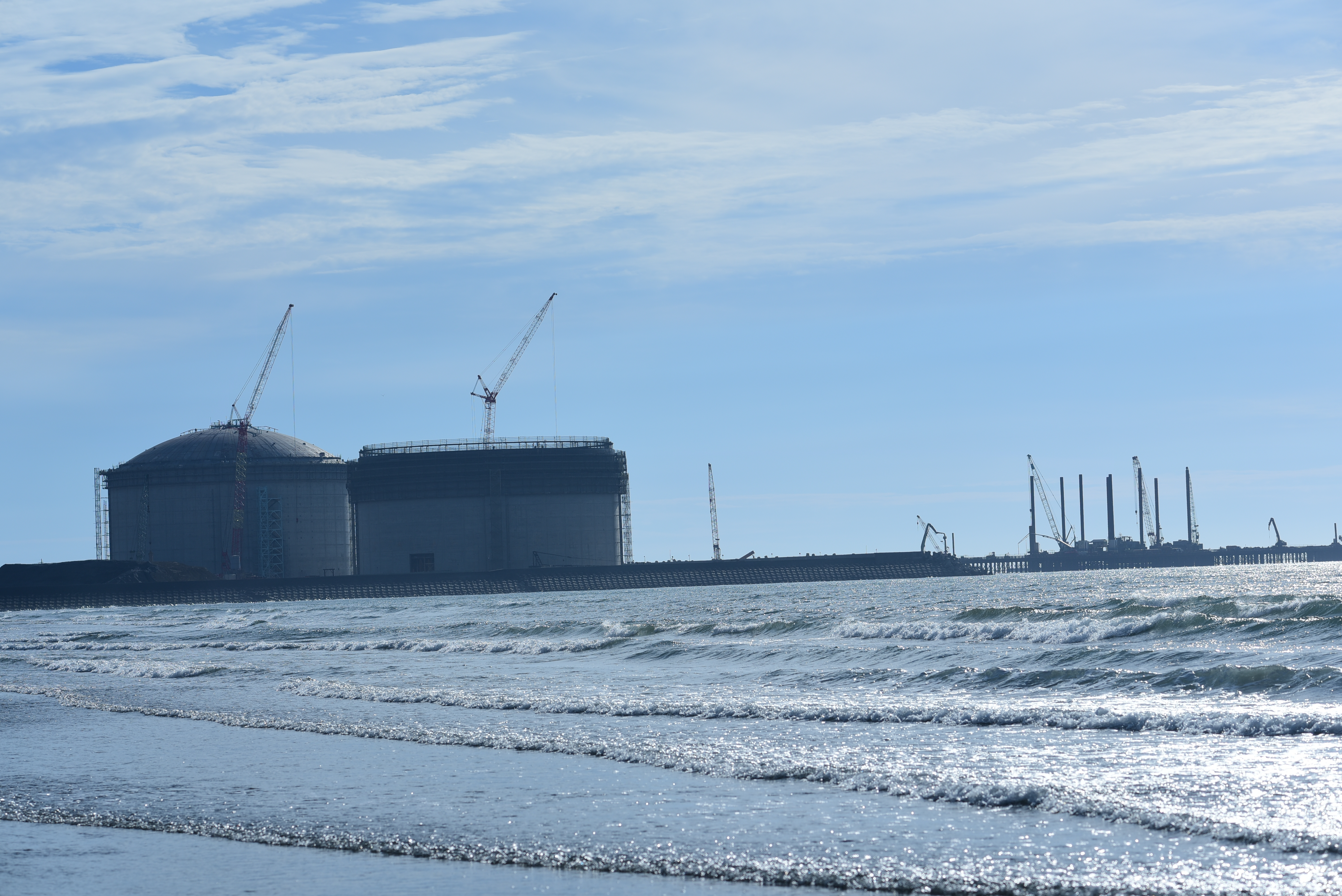
- The planned location of Guantang LNG Terminal
- Interactive map of the Guantang LNG Terminal area

General information
- Status: Under construction
- Type: LNG terminal
- Location: Guanyin, Taoyuan City, Taiwan
- Coordinates: 25°02′50.5″N 121°03′00.9″E
- Cost: NT$75 billion
- Owner: CPC Corporation

Technical details
- Grounds: 9 km^{2}

The Guantang LNG Terminal (traditional Chinese: 觀塘液化天然氣接收站; simplified Chinese: 观塘液化天然气接收站; pinyin: Guāntáng Yèhuà Tiānránqì Jiēshōu Zhàn) is a liquefied natural gas (LNG) terminal under construction in Datan Borough, Guanyin District, Taoyuan City, Taiwan.

== History ==
The terminal design was originally drafted in 2015. In 2018, the government considered relocating the terminal but rejected this idea because the new proposed site was reserved for a planned offshore wind farm. On 8 October 2018, the terminal project passed its environmental impact assessment. The construction of the terminal is expected to be completed by 2025.

== Architecture ==
The terminal will span an area of 9 km^{2}. The original location of the terminal was proposed to be 455 meters from the coastline. However, due to pressure from environmental activists over to the existence of a sensitive coral reef in the nearby area, the terminal was redesigned to be 750 meters further away, with a total distance of around 1.2 km out to the sea from the shoreline. The relocation design was expected to add NT$15 billion to the cost of the project, for an estimated total cost of NT$75 billion.

== See also ==
- List of LNG terminals
