= Gorgon gas project =

Natural gas project in Western Australia

Gorgon Gas Project
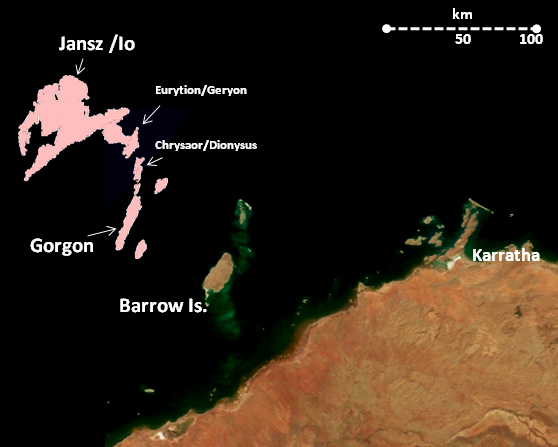
- Location of some of the Greater Gorgon gas fields in relation to Barrow Island and the adjacent coastline

- Location in Australia
- Location: Barrow Island, Western Australia, Australia; 20°47′S 115°25′E
- Products: Liquified Natural Gas, Condensate, Pipeline Gas
- Company: Chevron Corporation (47.3%); ExxonMobil (25%); Royal Dutch Shell (25%); Osaka Gas (1.25%); Tokyo Gas (1%); Chubu Electric Power (0.417%)
- Website: Chevron Gorgon Site

The Gorgon gas project is a multi-decade natural gas project in Western Australia, involving the development of the Greater Gorgon gas fields, subsea gas-gathering infrastructure, and a liquefied natural gas (LNG) plant on Barrow Island. The project also includes a domestic gas component. Construction was completed in 2017. It is Australia's most expensive ever resources development.

== Location ==
'Greater Gorgon' refers to a grouping of several gas fields, including Gorgon, Chandon, Geryon, Orthrus, Maenad, Eurytion, Urania, Chrysaor, Dionysus, Jansz/Io, and West Tryal Rocks, situated in the Barrow sub-basin of the Carnarvon Basin. The Gorgon field is centered about 130 kilometres (81 mi) off the north-west coast of Western Australia, where the water depth is approximately 200 metres (660 ft). Other fields in the group lie to the north, such as Jansz-Io, which covers an area of 2,000 square kilometres (770 sq mi), in a water depth of 1,300 metres (4,300 ft).

Barrow Island lies off the Pilbara coast, 85 kilometres (53 mi) north-north-east of Onslow and 140 kilometres (90 mi) west of Karratha. The largest of a group of islands which include the Montebello and Lowendal Islands, it is 25 kilometres (16 mi) long and 10 kilometres (6.2 mi) wide, covering 235 square kilometres (91 sq mi).

== History ==
More than 200 exploration wells had been drilled in the Barrow sub-basin by the end of 2001, including West Tryal Rocks in 1972, and Spar in 1976, both discovered by West Australian Petroleum (WAPET) which had been a pioneering company in the development of the Western Australian petroleum industry. WAPET was the operator on behalf of various joint ventures comprising Chevron, Texaco, Shell and Ampolex (the exploration division of Ampol). Chevron and Texaco merged in 2001; Mobil took over Ampolex and later merged with Exxon to form ExxonMobil. The takeover of Ampolex was completed on May 2, 2000. In 2000, Chevron became the operator of all WAPET's petroleum assets.

WAPET discovered Gorgon in 1981 with the drilling of the Gorgon 1 well. Later discoveries included Chrysaor (1994) and Dionysus (1996). The Jansz-Io gas accumulation, discovered in January 2000, contains an estimated 566 billion cubic meters of recoverable reserves.

The project received preliminary environmental approvals from the West Australian government in September 2007 and from the Federal Minister for the Environment in the following month after receiving approval in principle from the Western Australian Government to make restricted use of Barrow Island in September 2003. The project developers then submitted revised plans to cover an expansion in the size of the project. Final environmental approval was received from the state government on 11 August 2009. On 26 August 2009, the Federal Environment Minister announced that the expanded project on Barrow Island had been given conditional environmental approval.

During the 2007 Australian federal election campaign, the Australian Labor Party announced that a future Labor government would set aside 25% of future Petroleum Resource Rent Tax from the Gorgon project to establish a Western Australian Infrastructure Fund. Although no timescale was officially given, two election cycles later in 2013 the promise had yet to be honoured. PRRT contributions are often delayed depending on tax deductions that companies are eligible for, and the then-labour Julia Gillard government proposed that it would be revisited once revenue began flowing from the project. However, senior lecturer at Monash University and expert on taxation law and natural resource policy, Diane Kraal, estimated in 2017 that under the current fiscal system, the Gorgon Gas project had yet to contribute to the PRRT system and would not until around 2030.

== Gas fields ==
The Gorgon and Jansz-Io gas fields are 200 kilometres (120 mi) from the coast of mainland Australia. In 2006 Chevron, the project leads, were working with an estimated resource base of 40 trillion cubic feet. Later estimates have placed the volume of natural gas at 35.3 trillion cubic feet (1,000×10^{9} m^{3}), that may have a lifespan of 60 years .

According to Chevron, the Janz-Io field is 9,100 - 10,350 ft beneath the seabed, while the Gorgon gas field is 11,350 - 13,600 ft beneath the seabed. Though this is due to the Gorgon gas field being closer to land than the Janz-Io field where the land curves upwards to form Barrow Island, both fields are approximately 14,615 ft beneath sea level.

== Developers ==
The project was developed by the Gorgon Joint Venture, which as of 2009, consisted of Australian subsidiaries of three global energy companies:

- Chevron Australia & Texaco Australia (both subsidiaries of Chevron) (47.3% share and project operator) utilizing the Kellogg Joint Venture to engineer, procure and construct all downstream facilities (partners in this JV included Clough, a subsidiary of Murray & Roberts)
- Shell Development Australia (a subsidiary of Royal Dutch Shell) (25%)
- Mobil Australia Resources (a subsidiary of ExxonMobil) (25%)
- Osaka Gas (1.25%)
- Tokyo Gas (1%)
- Chubu Electric Power, now JERA (0.417%)

== Scope ==
The scope of the project includes:

- 300 ha of land has been acquired on Barrow Island
- 3 LNG trains, each capable of liquifying 5.2 million metric tonnes of LNG per year
- Total capacity of 15.6 million metric tonnes of LNG per year
- 300 terajoules per day domestic gas plant
- Ground breaking occurred on 1 December 2009
- LNG for commercial use first left Barrow Island in 2016. The first LNG carrier The Asian Excellence in left 21 March 2016, with main domestic supply to Western Australia starting in December of the same year.
- As of 2009, production was slated to end between 2054 and 2074

Using initially 18 wells, according to the Environment Impact Statement of 2009, gas was to be delivered via subsea gathering systems and pipelines to the north-west coast of Barrow Island, then via an underground pipeline system to gas treatment and liquefaction facilities on the island's south-east coast. The plant was intended to consist of 3 liquefied natural gas (LNG) trains, each capable of producing a nominal capacity of 5.2 million tonnes per annum (MTPA).

According to the 2009 Environment Impact Statement, LNG and condensate, initially stored in onshore tanks, was to be offloaded from a 2,100 m (1.3 mi) jetty onto LNG carriers and oil tankers, for delivery to overseas customers. Natural gas for domestic use will be transported by a 70 km subsea pipeline to the mainland, for transmission to local customers.

On the total investment of the Gorgon LNG project, media articles have reported analyst forecasts of estimated costs ranging from A$11 billion (in 2003), A$16 billion (2007), and A$50bn in March 2009 to A$43bn in Sept 2009 and A$53bn in 2015.

=== Carbon Dioxide Sequestration ===
Carbon dioxide (CO_{2}), which comprises around 15% of the raw gas stream from the Gorgon field, is stripped out then injected into formations 2 kilometers below the island, with 3.4 to 4 million tonnes of CO_{2} planned to be stored each year. Inclusion of the carbon capture project was required by Australian environmental regulators. However, in December 2017 it was announced that technical problems mean that CO_{2} would not be stored until late 2018 or early 2019, two years after the plant began operation. This will result in 5.5-7.8 million tonnes of CO_{2} being released.

Carbon dioxide injection started in August 2019, with full injection rates anticipated by first quarter 2020 (This has not been independently verified as of September 2020). In November 2023, it was reported that over the 2022-2023 period, only about one third of the CO_{2} generated by the site had been sequestered, mainly due to issues managing the subsurface pressure to avoid damaging the cap layer that traps the CO_{2}.

== Economic benefits ==
Economic modelling carried out in 2008 as part of the environmental impact assessment process, forecast the following macroeconomic impacts (based on a 30-year period):

- Department of Energy, Mines, Industry Regulation and Safety listed generation of more than 10,000 jobs in Australia
- more than 350 direct and indirect jobs sustaining throughout the life of the project
- an increase in national Gross Domestic Product (GDP) of A$64.3 billion (in net present value terms)
- A$33 billion of expenditure on locally purchased goods and services
- additional government revenue of about A$40 billion (in 2009 dollars)

== Gas sales ==
=== LNG export agreements ===
LNG sales agreements were reached between the joint venturers and customers in China, India, Japan and South Korea.

Chevron Australia has executed Sale and Purchase Agreements (SPAs) with Nippon Oil Corporation, now JXTG (0.3 Mtpa for 15 years), Tokyo Gas (1.1Mtpa for 25 years and 1 percent equity) and Chubu Electric Power, now JERA (1.44Mtpa for 25 years and 0.417 percent equity in the Gorgon Project) in 2009, Kyushu Electric (0.3 Mtpa for 15 years) in 2011, Osaka Gas (1.375Mtpa for 25 years and 1.25 percent equity in the Gorgon Project) in 2012 and GS Caltex of South Korea (0.25 Mtpa for 20 years from Gorgon). Chevron Australia also had a Heads of Agreement with Korea Gas Corporation (KOGAS) (1.5Mtpa for 15 years), however it is reported that this was not completed;

Shell has entered into long-term LNG sale and purchase agreements with PetroChina International Company Limited and BP Singapore Pte. Limited and also has secured capacity at LNG receiving terminals including the terminals at Energia Costa Azul LNG in Baja California, Mexico and Hazira in Gujarat, India.

An Australian subsidiary of ExxonMobil has signed long-term sales and purchase agreements with Petronet LNG Limited of India and PetroChina International Company Limited for the supply of LNG from the Gorgon Project. The agreement with Petronet LNG is for the supply of approximately 1.5 Mtpa of LNG over a 20-year term while the agreement with PetroChina is for the supply of approximately 2.25 Mtpa over a 20-year term. Together, these two sales and purchase agreements commit the ExxonMobil subsidiary's share of LNG from the 15 Mtpa Gorgon LNG Project.

=== Domestic gas ===
Under the provisions of the Barrow Island Act (2003), the joint venturers are required to reserve 2000 petajoules of gas for delivery into the domestic market. The Gorgon Joint Venture announced plans to establish a domestic gas project, including plans for progressive expansion to enable delivery of 300 terajoules of gas per day into the domestic transmission system. Chevron have indicated that deliveries of Gorgon domestic gas will commence around the time of start-up of the third LNG train.

== Criticisms ==
The proposed project attracted criticism from conservation groups due to the potential impact upon Barrow Island's ecology. The island is a Class A nature reserve, home to the flatback turtle (classified as a vulnerable species) and numerous other animals not found on the Australian mainland. Other concerns are related to the adequacy of quarantine procedures on Barrow Island to protect against introduced species, and risks associated with geological sequestration of CO_{2}. It was reported in November 2011 that native animals on Barrow Island had been accidentally killed daily with a known total of 1550 since construction began.

== See also ==
- Gorgon Carbon Dioxide Injection Project
- Petroleum industry in Western Australia
