= Camisea Gas Project =

Natural gas extraction field in Cusco Region, Peru

Camisea gas fields
- Country: Peru
- Offshore/onshore: Onshore
- Coordinates: 11°50′19.19″S 72°57′1.05″W
- Operator: Pluspetrol
- Partners: Pluspetrol; Hunt Oil Company; SK Corporation; Repsol YPF; Tecpetrol; Sonatrach

Field history
- Discovery: 1986
- Start of production: 2004

Production
- Estimated gas in place: 13,400×10^{9} cu ft (380×10^{9} m^{3})

The Camisea Gas Project extracts and transports natural gas originating near the Urubamba River in Megantoni District, La Convención Province in the Cusco Region of Peru. The project, which cost nearly four billion dollars by 2015, developed in a remote, forested region of the Amazon Basin which has a population of mostly Indigenous people.

== History ==
In July 1981 the Peruvian government signed an oil contract for blocks 38 and 42 with Royal Dutch Shell. The contract covered approximately 20,000 square kilometres (7,700 sq mi) in the southern part of the Ucayali Basin. The Camisea gas fields were discovered in 1986 by Shell. By 1987, two non-associated natural gas fields, San Martín and Cashiriari, were approved economically feasible. In March 1988, the preliminary agreement on exploration was signed between Petroperú and Shell. However, the talks ended in August of that year without reaching a final agreement.

Shell and Petroperú signed the agreement for the assessment and development of the Camisea fields in March 1994. A consortium of Shell and Mobil started to develop the fields, but cancelled all projects in Peru in July 1998, due to political concerns. Six drilled wells and facilities went to the Peruvian State. For this reason, in May 1999, the Commission for the Promotion of Private Investment agrees to conduct a promotional process to develop the Camisea project through a scheme involving independent modules segmented business. In 1999, it adopted the Law No. 27133 with an assured supply of the domestic market by a "permanent horizon of 20 years." In late May 1999, the Special Committee of Camisea Project (CECAM) convened two international public tender for awarding the contract for the exploitation of Camisea, concessions and transport of liquids and gas from these fields to the coast and gas distribution in Lima and Callao.

In December 2000, contracts were signed for the project development with an international consortium which now includes of Pluspetrol (27.2%), Hunt Oil Company (25.2%) SK Corporation (17.6%), Repsol YPF (10%), Tecpetrol (10%), and Sonatrach (10%). The key legal advisors in the transaction were Jaime Malagón, Jerome Jakubik, Paul Slocomb, and Víctor M. Marroquín of Baker & McKenzie, the international law firm retained by the Peruvian Government to advise on all privatization processes. In early May 2002, signed the concession contract for the transportation and distribution of gas from Camisea. In 2003 promulgating the DS 031-MS, eliminating the phrase "permanent horizon of 20 years" of Law No. 27133 and replacing it with "a minimum period specified in the contract." In June 2005 approving the Law 28 552, which amends Law 27133, disappears the phrase "permanent horizon of 20 years" and instead supply guarantees are mentioned in general terms. This made possible to allocate 100% of the Block 56 reserves for export. Since the Block 56 was not sufficient for export commitment again make the policy changes necessary to also dispose of Lot 88, for the domestic market. In December 2005 promulgating the 2005 EM 050 DS. In the preamble to the DS was explicitly stated that having the Act amended 28552 Article 4 of Law 27133 in relation to supplying the domestic market, authorizing Perupetro to renegotiate the contract for Block 88 to allow its proven reserves are exported.

The development plan was carried out under the government of President Alejandro Toledo and the gas fields became operational in August 2004.

== Gas fields ==
The gas fields are located in Ucayali Basin. According to data verified by the international energy consulting firm Gaffney, Cline & Associates, the Camisea gas fields contain about 13.4 trillion cubic feet (380×10^{9} m^{3}) of natural gas and 482 million barrels (76.6×10^{6} m^{3}) of natural gas liquids.

== Pipelines ==
Two pipelines carry natural gas from the Camisea gas fields. The 540-kilometre (340 mi) Camisea pipeline traverses through the steep Andes mountains, and terminates within the Paracas National Reservation (Ica Region) at the Pisco terminal. It passes through the Malvinas plant, where liquefied petroleum gas (propane and heavier liquids) is separated from natural gas. The pipeline has capacity of 450 million cubic feet per day (13×10^{6} m^{3}/d). The second 714-kilometre (444 mi) natural gas pipeline runs from Malvinas along the coast to Lima and Callao for distribution to residents and industries in the capital city. LPG is exported through the Pisco terminal. This pipeline system is operated by Transportadora de Gas Peruano, a consortium of Tecgas, Pluspetrol, Hunt Oil Company, SK Corporation, Sonatrach and Grana y Montero.

In April 2007, Suez Energy and Kuntur Gas Transport unveiled rival proposals for pipelines to carry Camisea gas to southern Peru.

== Controversy ==
Law 27133 was amended by Supreme Decree 050-2005, 006-2006 and 031-2004, both given by the Ministry of Energy and Mines. Those rules were signed by Alejandro Toledo, Pedro Pablo Kuczynski and Jaime Quijandria. This conduct would be unconstitutional because the President would have issued a Supreme Decree (No. 050-2005 and 006-2006) in open distortion of the law (Law 27,133), thus violating Article 118 (paragraph 8) of the Constitution, rule setting corresponding to the president, exercising the power of regulating laws without violating or distorting. For the above irregularities are accused former officials of the crimes of extortion, collusion, unfair and abuse of authority.

Under Article 384 of the Criminal Code sets out the demand-MEM-which makes the proper functional performance of public officials, is to ensure that interests of the State ", but" the conduct of former president and former minister (Clodomiro Sanchez) to allow modification of operation contracts for Block 88 that rule violated the Criminal Code. Under Article 376 of the Penal Code, abusive behavior is to violate the normative basis using the position that the subject (official) supports. This is arbitrary distorting an Act (27 133) through a Supreme Decree (050-2005 and 006-2006).

As of March 2006 there had been five spills along the pipeline. The latest one occurred on 4 March 2006, resulting in three injuries.

The UN has called for the "immediate suspension" of any plans to expand the Camisea Gas project, due to the high likelihood that by further intrusion into the Nahua-Nanti Reserve, several uncontacted and isolated tribes who live in the territory could be placed at risk of disease and death, as well as extreme scarcity brought on by disruption to game animals. The territory also serves as a buffer zone for Manu National Park, considered by UNESCO to be "the most biodiverse place on earth." Despite these concerns, an independent panel established by the Ex-Im Bank of the United States concluded, after five years of multi-disciplinary research, that the Camisea project has adhered to high environmental and social standards, and that its economic impact has been fundamental for Peru's economic growth.

== See also ==
- Peru LNG
