= Cobb Electric Membership Corporation =

American electric utility provider

Cobb Electric Membership Corporation, more commonly known as Cobb EMC, is a non-profit electric utility company serving parts of Cobb, Cherokee, Bartow, Paulding, and small sections of Fulton counties in Georgia. In 2009, it had total sales of over 3.8 billion kilowatt-hours (13.7 billion megajoules).

It was founded in 1938 with 489 residential members and 14 business accounts, and now serves about 200,000 homes and businesses (including over 180,000 in northwest metro Atlanta), making it one of the largest electric membership corporations in the state and country. However, most residents in Cobb and other counties are customers of Georgia Power, while those within the city limits of Marietta (the Cobb county seat) are customers of Marietta Power, a municipal utility run by the city.

Cobb EMC participates in a rebate program for customers who install solar panels. In January 2009, the company joined with Green Power EMC to buy 17 megawatts of electric power from a company which upgraded the power plant at the former Fruit of the Loom factory in Rabun Gap to use logging biomass as a fuel.

== Cobb Energy ==
Cobb Energy Management Corporation, usually known as Cobb Energy, was created as a for-profit subsidiary in 1997.

It eventually sparked a lawsuit by Cobb EMC members, charging that their money was being funneled into the new company, after a 2007 exposé by the Atlanta Journal-Constitution. Shareholders prevailed, and won again on appeal to the Georgia Court of Appeals in April 2010. Cobb Energy was folded back into the non-profit cooperative. Co-op board elections, delayed by the litigation since 2007, were scheduled to resume in the fall of 2011.

In early January 2011, the CEO of Cobb EMC was arrested and charged with 31 counts of racketeering and theft after his indictment by a county grand jury in the matter, citing more than 50 million dollars taken from or not paid to the EMC by Cobb Energy.

Prior to these events, the company purchased naming rights to the new Cobb Energy Performing Arts Centre, which still bears the name.

== Partners and affiliates ==
- ENERGY STAR
- Green Power EMC
- Gas South
- Touchstone Energy
- Georgia Electric Membership Corporation (Georgia EMC)
