= Gas South =

American natural gas provider

- Industry: Natural gas
- Founded: January 5, 2006; 20 years ago
- Headquarters: Atlanta, Georgia, U.S.
- Area served: Southeast, Mid-Atlantic, Midwest
- Key people: Kevin Greiner (CEO)
- Website: www.gassouth.com

Gas South is an American natural gas marketer based in Atlanta, Georgia. The company serves nearly 500,000 residential, commercial and governmental customers throughout the Southeast, Mid-Atlantic and Midwest.

== Company ==
Gas South began operations in 2006 as a wholly owned subsidiary of Cobb Electric Membership Corporation. Georgia's natural gas industry was partially deregulated in 1997 with the passing of the Natural Gas Competition and Deregulation Act, giving commercial and residential customers in many parts of the state a range of options. Under deregulation, the local distribution company, Atlanta Gas Light Company (AGLC), elected to no longer serve as a retail gas supplier and instead solely maintain and operate the distribution system. AGL is responsible for ensuring gas delivery, managing storage assets and transportation services on behalf of natural gas marketers. In turn, natural gas marketers sell gas directly to retail customers on a competitive basis.

Gas South provides natural gas in the Southeast, Mid-Atlantic and Midwest within the United States. Following the acquisition of Infinite Energy in December 2020, Gas South now serves nearly 500,000 residential, business and governmental customers.

Gas South's leadership team consists of President and Chief Executive Officer Kevin Greiner, Chief Operating Officer David Malone, Chief Financial Officer Jamie Tiernan, Chief Supply and Risk Officer Freddy Cardozo, Chief Legal and People Officer Stacy Paez and Chief Sales and Marketing Officer Jason Dolder.
