= LNG storage tank =

Atmospheric tank for the storage of liquefied natural gas

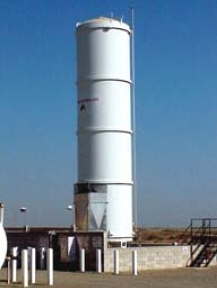
15.000 gallon LNG storage tank in the United States.

A liquefied natural gas storage tank or a LNG storage tank is a specialized type of storage tank used for the storage of Liquefied Natural Gas, or LNG. LNG storage tanks can be found in ground, above ground or in LNG carriers.

The common characteristic of LNG Storage tanks is the ability to store LNG at the very low temperature of -162 °C (-260 °F). This is possible with the LNG storage tanks' double containers, where the inner contains LNG and the outer container contains insulation materials. The most common tank type is the full containment tank which consists of a inner storage compartment for normal operation and a secondary compartment to contain the product following an emergency leak from the inner primary container. Tanks can also vary greatly in size, depending on usage. The world's largest tank (completed in 2023) is a 270,000 cubic meter large tank built in Qingdao, China by Sinopec for the Qingdao LNG Receiving Terminal.

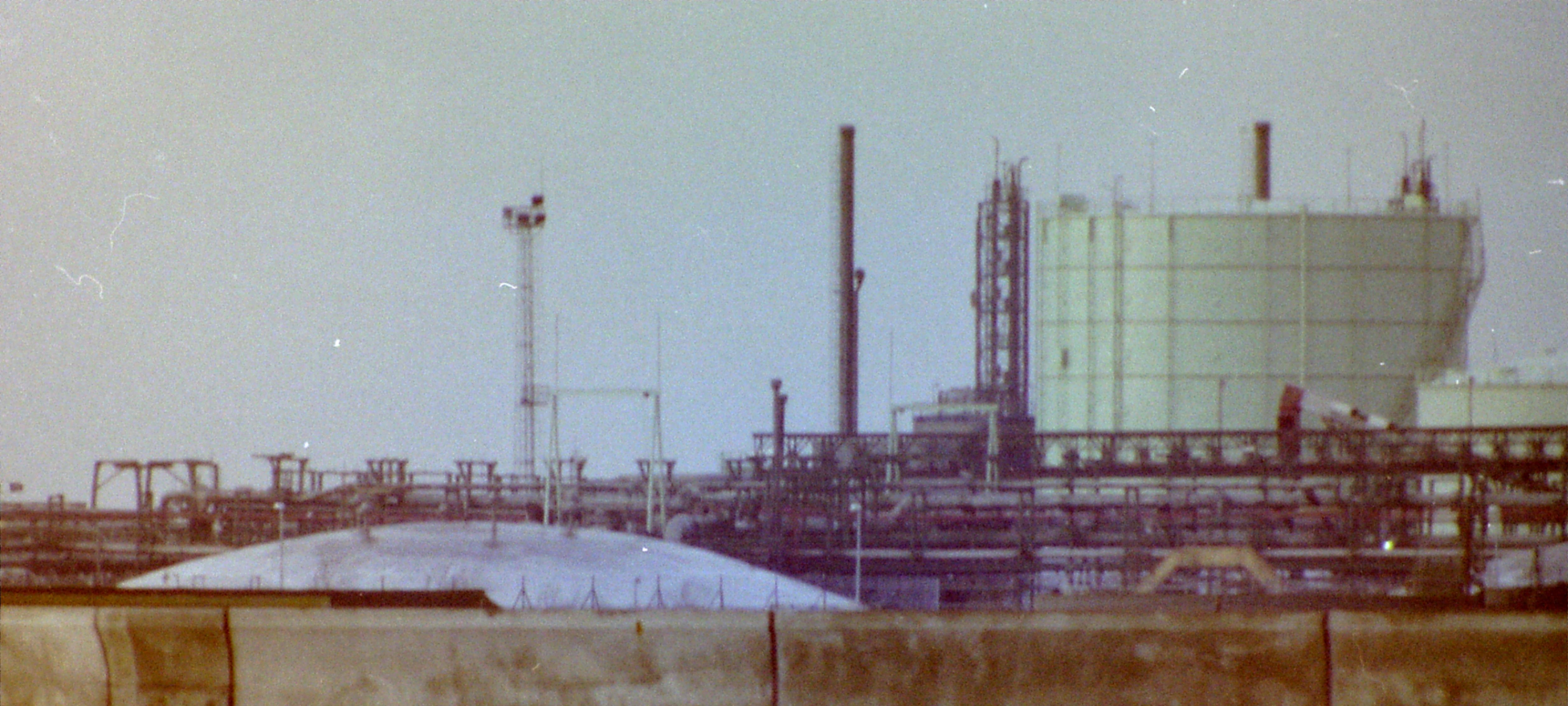
LNG terminal in Canvey Island, UK

In-ground LNG tanks are also used; these are lined or unlined tanks beneath ground level. The low temperature of the LNG freezes the soil and provides effective containment. The tank is sealed with an aluminium alloy roof at ground level. Historically, there have been problems with some unlined tanks concerning escape of LNG into fissures, the gradual expansion of extent of the frozen ground, and frost heaving which have limited the operational capability of in-ground tanks. All piping connected to the LNG tanks, whether above ground or in-ground, are routed through the top of the vessel. This mitigates against loss of containment in the event off a piping breach.

In the LNG storage tank, the pressure and temperature within the tank will continue to rise. LNG is a cryogen, and is kept in its liquid state at very low temperatures. The temperature within the tank will remain constant if the pressure is kept constant by allowing the boil off gas to escape from the tank. This is known as auto-refrigeration.

== See also ==
- Liquefied natural gas terminal
