= Gorgon Carbon Dioxide Injection Project =

The Gorgon Carbon Dioxide Injection Project is part of the Gorgon Project, one of the world's largest natural gas projects. The Gorgon Project, located on Barrow Island in Western Australia, includes a liquefied natural gas (LNG) plant, a domestic gas plant, and a Carbon Dioxide Injection Project.

Carbon dioxide injections commenced in 2019. Once operating at full capacity, the Gorgon Carbon Dioxide Injection Project will be the world's largest CO_{2} injection plant, with an ability to store up to 4 million tons of CO_{2} per year – approximately 120 million tons over the project's lifetime, and 40 percent of total Gorgon Project emissions.

== Technology ==
Gas is supplied from two world-class gas fields namely, Gorgon field that contains on average 14% of naturally occurring reservoir CO_{2}, and Jansz-lo field that contains less than 1% CO_{2}. Reservoir CO_{2} is extracted from natural gas as a part of normal gas-processing operations. During the liquefaction process, natural gas is cooled to -162 °C. CO_{2} freezes above this temperature, so it needs to be separated from the natural gas stream prior to gas processing and liquefaction. Separation is performed using a basic absorber and stripper system and an amine-based solvent.

The Gorgon Carbon Dioxide Injection Project will compress and pipe separated CO_{2} to nine injection wells where it will be subsequently injected into the Dupuy Formation. Once the CO_{2} is injected, it will migrate through the Dupuy Formation until it remains trapped. The top of the Dupuy Formation reservoir is located approximately 2300 m below Barrow Island and is overlain by a thick shale cap-rock seal. The pressure in the reservoir will cause the injected CO_{2} to behave as a supercritical fluid with behavior of both a liquid and a gas. The reservoir CO_{2} will become trapped in the reservoir through a combination of residual saturation trapping and by dissolution into the waters in the formation.

== Environmental impacts ==
The carbon dioxide injection plant is located on Barrow Island, a Class A nature reserve. Therefore, the development of the processing plant had to undergo very strict environmental regulations. The Joint Venture established expert panels to protect the biodiversity of the island and surrounding marine environment. To ensure that the Dupuy Formation was suitable for underground injection of reservoir carbon dioxide, the Gorgon Joint Venture undertook additional drilling, well tests, and seismic surveys prior to making the final investment decision. An ongoing monitoring program, including observation wells and seismic surveys, will assist in managing the performance of the injected carbon dioxide in the Dupuy Formation.

== History and criticism ==
This project, led by Chevron, has been designed to capture 3.5 Mt of carbon dioxide per annum from Greater Gorgon gas fields and store it in the Dupuy formation beneath the Barrow Island. Upon completion, the project will be the largest carbon dioxide sequestration operation in the world. Chevron is liable for leaks and other damage during the project's lifetime and for 15 years afterwards, but in 2009 the state and federal governments agreed to indemnify Chevron against liability for the project after that time, with the Commonwealth in 2015 confirming it would adopt 80% of the liability and WA the remaining 20%.

When construction on the project began in 2009, it was expected to be completed by 2014 - including carbon capture and storage. The project ultimately started extracting gas in February 2017 but carbon capture and storage was delayed multiple times. A delay until March 2019 resulted in a further five million tonnes of CO_{2} to be released, because:

A Chevron report to the State Government released yesterday said start-up checks this year found leaking valves, valves that could corrode and excess water in the pipeline from the LNG plant to the injection wells that could cause the pipeline to corrode.

In May 2018, the WA Environmental Protection Authority announced an investigation into whether Gorgon could meet its storage commitments given the delays. In March 2019, Chevron announced that carbon capture and storage was delayed by another nine months, which would result in the release of a further 7.9 to 11.1 million tonnes of CO_{2}.

WWF claims that the Gorgon geosequestration project is potentially unsafe as the area has over 700 wells drilled in the area, 50 of which reach the area proposed for geosequestration of CO_{2}. Fault lines compound the problems. Barrow Island is also an A class nature reserve of global importance.
