= Southern LNG =

Southern LNG is an American re-gasification facility on Elba Island, in Chatham County, Georgia, five miles (8 km) downstream from Savannah, Georgia. The initial authorization for the Elba Island facility was issued in 1972. LNG shipments ceased during the first half of 1980. On March 16, 2000, the project received Federal Energy Regulatory Commission (FERC) authorization to re-commission and renovate the LNG facilities.

On April 10, 2003, FERC issued an order authorizing the expansion of the facility, which included adding a second and third docking berth, a fourth cryogenic storage tank, and associated facilities. The expansion enabled an increase of both the working gas capacity and the firm send-out rate.

El Paso Corporation, the owner of the Southern LNG facility, announced the start up of the expanded facility, called Elba II, on February 1, 2006. The expansion cost approximately $157 million and adds 3.3 billion cubic feet (93,000,000 m^{3}) equivalent of storage capacity and 540 million cubic feet per day (15,000,000 m^{3}/d) of peak send-out capacity.

El Paso Corporation also applied for an additional expansion, on February 1, 2006, called Elba III, to double capacity again by 2010. On September 20, 2007 FERC approved El Paso's expansion for Elba III.

== Stats ==
- Operator: Southern LNG, Inc. (inbound-ship terminus) - Elba Express Company, LLC (outbound-pipeline terminus)
- Owner: Kinder Morgan (100%)
- Capacity: 7.3×10^{9} cu ft (210,000,000 m^{3})
- Total peak send-out capacity: over 1.2×10^{9} cu ft/d (34,000,000 m^{3}/d)

== Latha Anderson, et al. v. FERC ==
On March 24, 2008 Latha Anderson filed a suit against FERC, Latha Anderson, et al. v. FERC, asking that FERC deny construction authority for the Northern Segment of Elba Express’s proposed pipeline (part of the Elba III project). Anderson charged that a thorough review for alternative route site selection was not done and that the Environmental Impact Statement (EIS) was manipulated to make the final approved, Northern Segment, route appeared to have the least impact on the environment. Anderson proposed that FERC reconsider a new route. Previously, on July 12, 2007 Anderson had ask FERC to deny the pipeline going through the Northern Segment. FERC denied Anderson’s motion for hearing, but said that it will review the petition.
