= Infinite energy =

Infinite energy may refer to:

- Infinite Energy (magazine), a bi-monthly alternative energy magazine
- Perpetual motion, a device or system that delivers more energy than was put into it
- Infinite Energy (company), an energy provider in Florida
- Anant Virya ("infinite energy" or "perfect power"), a characteristic of the soul in Jainism

== See also ==
- Free energy suppression, a conspiracy theory that says that technology that could produce unlimited energy is being suppressed by special interest groups
