= Osaka Gas =

Japanese gas utility company

Osaka Gas Co., Ltd.
- Trade name: 大阪ガス
- Native name: 大阪ガス株式会社 大阪瓦斯株式会社 (with ateji)
- Romanized name: Ōsaka Gasu kabushiki gaisha
- Type: Public KK
- Traded as: TYO: 9532
- Industry: Energy Producer and Services Provider
- Founded: Nishi-ku, Osaka, Japan (April 15, 1897; 129 years ago)
- Headquarters: Chuo-ku, Osaka, Japan
- Key people: Masataka Fujiwara (President and CEO)
- Products: Liquefied natural gas, Energy
- Revenue: ▲¥1,294,781 million (2012); ¥1,187,142 million (2011)
- Operating income: ▼¥77,274 million (2012); ¥88,584 million (2011)
- Net income: ▼¥45,207 million (2012); ¥45,968 million (2011)
- Total assets: ▲¥1,475,759 million (2012); ¥1,437,297 million (2011)
- Total equity: ▲¥708,904 million (2012); ¥688,695 million (2011)
- Number of employees: ▲19,818 (2012); 19,360 (2011)
- Website: osakagas.co.jp

Osaka Gas Co., Ltd. (大阪ガス株式会社 or 大阪瓦斯株式会社, Ōsaka Gasu Kabushiki-gaisha), commonly written as 大阪ガス, is a Japanese gas company based in Osaka, Japan. It supplies gas to the Kansai region, especially the Keihanshin area.

Osaka Gas is also engaged in upstream, midstream and downstream energy projects throughout the world, including LNG terminals, pipelines and independent power projects, particularly in Southeast Asia, Australia and North America.

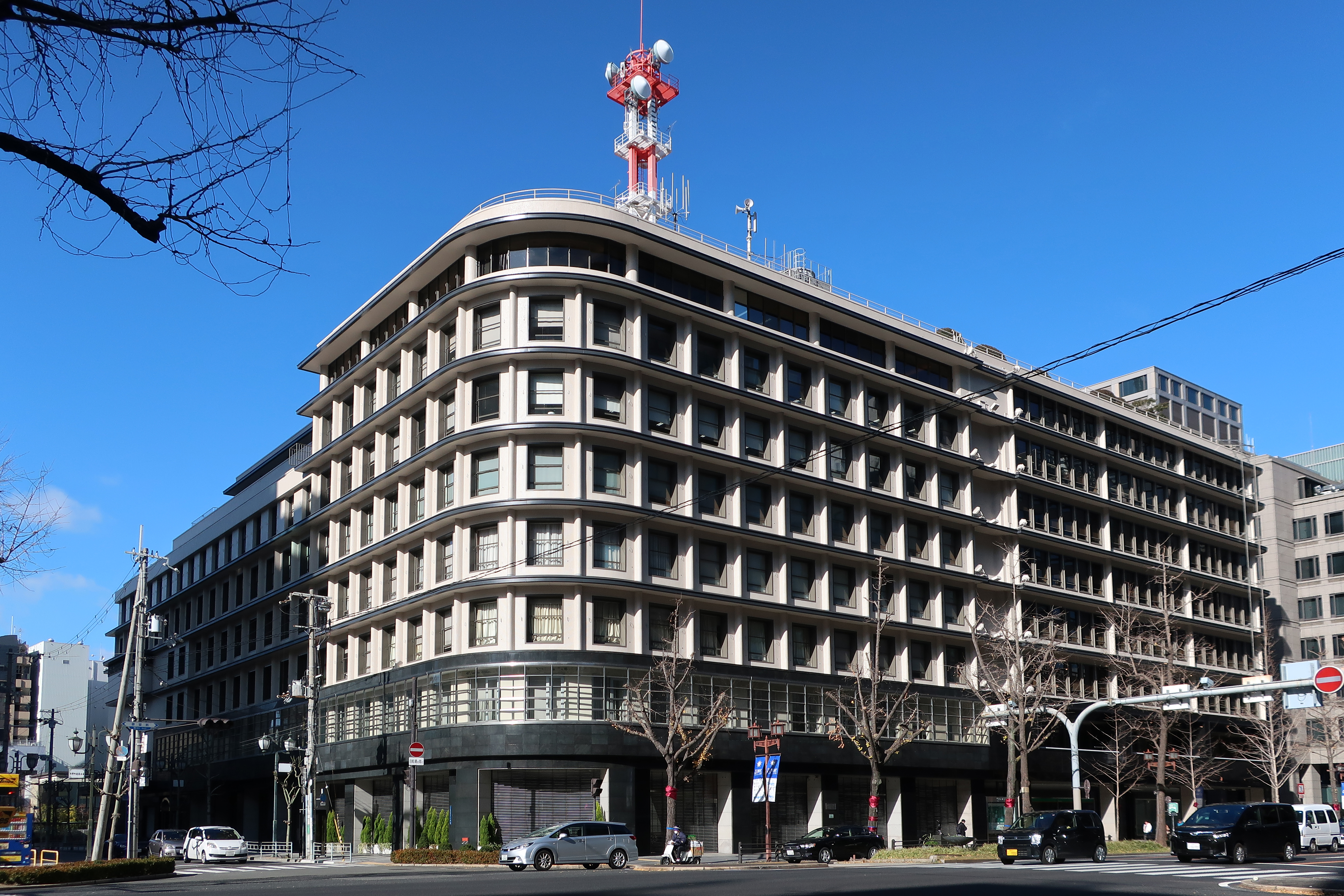
Osaka Gas Building 1-2, Hiranomachi Yonchome, Chuo-ku, Osaka, Japan

== Overview ==
The company serves 68 million households over a 3,220 km^{2} area. It has annual gas sales of 8.5 billion m^{3} and operates 56,500 km of pipeline in Japan.

The company owns upstream oil and gas assets in Norway and Australia, including Gorgon LNG, Sunrise LNG and Crux projects in Australia and Qalhat LNG in Oman. They have a Liquefied natural gas terminal in Senboku, as well as providing bunkering services for ships.

It also owns pipeline and power assets internationally.

== History ==
Osaka Gas began operations in 1897 in Nishi-ku, Osaka, on a site now occupied by the Dome City Gas Building near the Kyocera Dome. It expanded to Wakayama in 1911. Following the end of World War II, in October 1945, Osaka Gas merged with 14 other gas companies in the Kansai region, expanding its footprint to cover Kobe and Kyoto.

Osaka Gas entered its first overseas upstream LNG project in Brunei in 1972, followed by investments in Indonesia in 1977 and Australia in 1989.

== Affiliates ==
- Osaka Gas Australia Pty Ltd
- Osaka Gas Engineering Company Limited
- Osaka Gas Chemical Company Limited
- Senboku Power Fuel Company Limited
- Osaka Gas Energy America
