= Yemen LNG =

Natural gas liquefaction project in Yemen

Coordinates: 13°59′07″N 48°10′49″E

- Yemen LNG logo
- Native name: الشركة اليمنية للغاز الطبيعي المسال
- Industry: LNG
- Founded: 1995
- Headquarters: Balhaf, Hadhramout, Yemen
- Website: YLNG's official website

Yemen LNG (also called YLNG) is the first natural gas liquefaction (LNG) project in Yemen. The LNG plant is located in Balhaf.

== History ==
Yemen LNG Company was incorporated in 1995 to develop the LNG plant. In 1997, the development was halted because of the Asian economic crisis. The project was launched only in August 2005 after signing three LNG supply contracts. On 29 October 2007, Yemen LNG and Yemen state-owned oil and gas company Safer Exploration and Production agreed a 20-year contract, according to which Safer grants the LNG plant with supply up to 12.5 billion cubic meter (bcm) of gas per year from the Block 18 of the Marib-Jawf field. The production started on 15 October 2009.

== Technical description ==
The project comprises upstream gas processing facilities including a transfer line linking processing units, a spur-line for transporting gas to the Ma'bar area and a 320 kilometres (200 mi), 38 inches (970 mm) pipeline connecting the gas processing facilities to the LNG plant. The plant consists of two LNG trains with the total capacity of 6.7 million tonnes per year. The contractors for the construction of LNG trains were Technip, JGC, and Kellogg Brown & Root. The project is one of the country's first big project financing with total cost of US$4 billion, involving US$3 billion in debt being raised from a syndicate of banks. Bank of Tokyo-Mitsubishi UFJ, BNP Paribas, Citigroup, ING Group, Royal Bank of Scotland, Société Générale, and Sumitomo Mitsui Banking Corporation are the initial mandated lead arrangers and bookrunners on a loan.

== Project company ==
The consortium is led by Total S.A. (39.62%) in cooperation with Hunt Oil Company (17.22%), Yemen Gas Company (YGC; 16.73%), SK Corp. (9.55%), Kogas (6.00%), Hyundai Corporation (5.88%), and the General Authority for Social Security & Pensions of Yemen (5.00%). On 30 June 2010, Russia's government announced that Russian gas company Gazprom may buy Hunt Oil's stake, possibly together with Saudi Arabia.

== LNG exports ==
Yemen LNG has SPAs ('Sale and Purchase Agreement') to supply:

- Engie (formerly Suez) — 2.5 mtpa,
- Total S.A. — 2.0 mtpa,
- Kogas — 2.0 mtpa.

All SPAs last from 2009–2029.

Early November 2017, Total S.A. and Engie announced an agreement whereby Total S.A. would buy all Engie's LNG production in the world; it is assumed that this agreement covers Engie's prior SPA with Yemen LNG.

Due to the civil war raging in Yemen (Yemeni Civil War (2015–present)), the Yemen LNG partners stopped gas production, liquefaction and export in April 2015. Until today, April 2021, the production and exports had not yet resumed. The latest attack on a pipeline was in June 2019.
