= China Natural Gas =

Chinese energy company

China Natural Gas Ltd. 西蓝天然气股份有限公司
- Company type: Public
- Traded as: OTCQB: CHNG
- Industry: Oil and Gas
- Founded: December 2005
- Headquarters: Xi'an, China
- Key people: Mr. Shuwen Kang (CEO)
- Products: Natural gas
- Revenue: $21 million (Q2 2009)
- Net income: ▲$4 million (Q2 2009)
- Number of employees: 710 (2009)
- Website: www.naturalgaschina.com

China Natural Gas
- Simplified Chinese: 西蓝天然气股份有限公司
- Traditional Chinese: 西藍天然氣股份有限公司
Transcriptions
Standard Mandarin
- Hanyu Pinyin: Xīlán Tiānránqì Gǔfèn Yǒuxiàn Gōngsī

China Natural Gas Inc. is a Chinese energy company that, through its subsidiaries, is engaged in the distribution and sale of natural gas and gasoline to commercial, residential and industrial customers in the Xi'an area and the Shaanxi province of the People's Republic of China.

The company also engages in the construction of pipeline networks. It offers natural gas through a network of approximately 120 kilometers of high pressure pipelines and sells compressed natural gas as vehicular fuel through a network of filling stations in Shaanxi and Henan provinces.

China Natural Gas is the first Chinese natural gas retailing company to be publicly traded in the United States.

== Jingbian Terminal ==
The company completed a local government supported liquefied natural gas processing and distribution plant in Jingbian, Shaanxi province, in July, 2011.
