= Hunt Oil Company =

US-based oil and gas company

Coordinates: 32°47′15″N 96°48′08″W

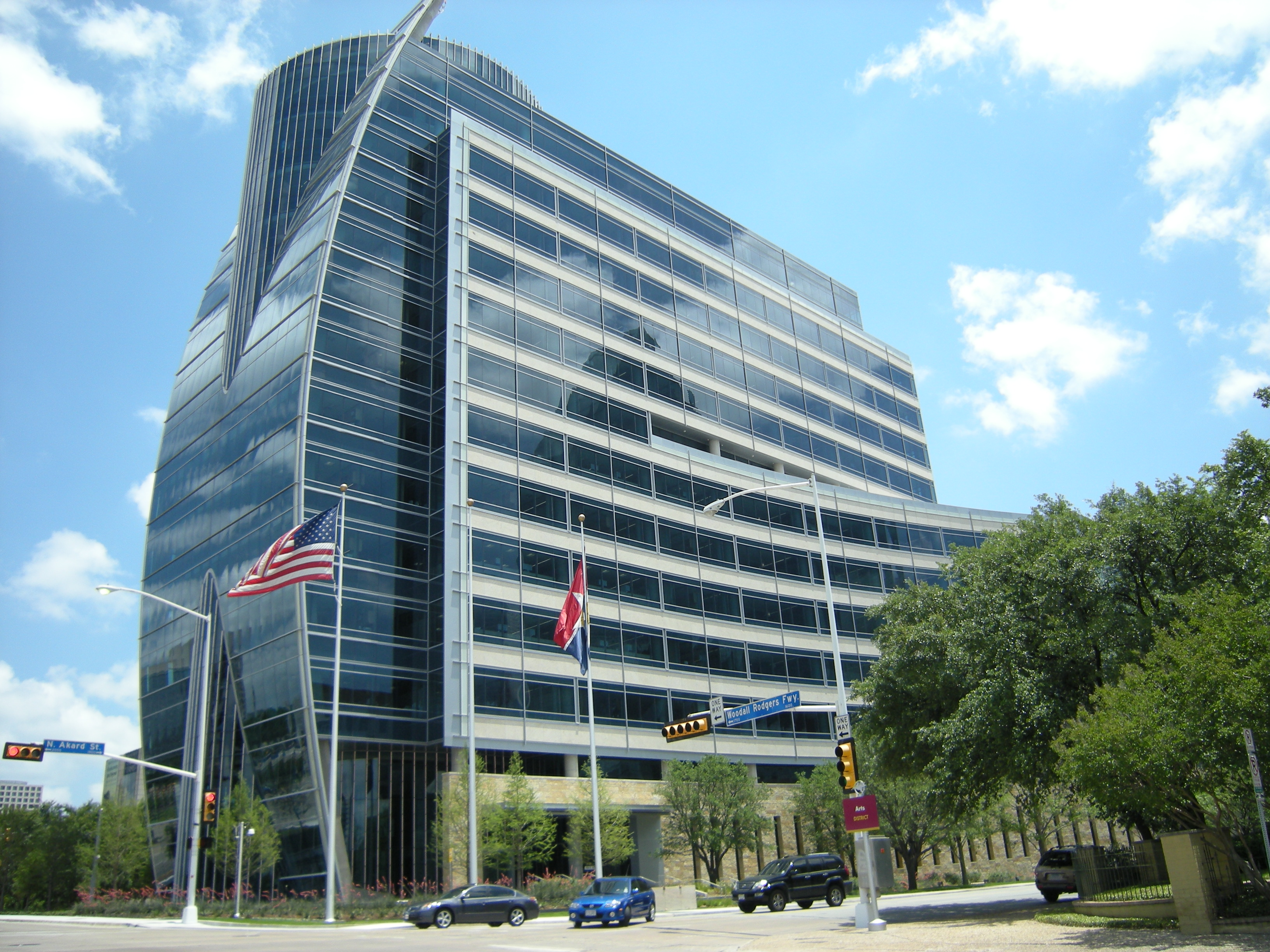
Hunt Oil Corporate Headquarters in Dallas, TX.

Hunt Oil Co. is an independent oil and gas company headquartered in Dallas, Texas. It conducts its main oil production activities in the United States, Canada and, as of 1984, in Yemen. In the past, the company was owned by American oil tycoon Haroldson Lafayette Hunt.

It also participates in liquefied natural gas production projects in Yemen (Yemen LNG) and Peru (Peru LNG).

Together with Magnum Hunter Resources Corp., the company drills wells in the Eagle Ford Shale Play, located in the Western Gulf Basin in South Texas. Hunt Oil is one of the largest privately held companies in the United States, with $4 billion in 2013 revenues. It is one of several Hunt companies active in energy, real estate, investments, ranching and infrastructure. In 2007 Hunt Oil signed a production sharing contract with the Kurdistan Regional Government to engage in oil and gas exploration and extraction.
