= Gulf Gateway Deepwater Port =

Coordinates: 28.0877°N 93.0519°W

Gulf Gateway Deepwater Port was the first offshore liquefied natural gas LNG import facility.

Gulf Gateway was owned by Excelerate Energy Limited Partnership. It was located in Block 603 of the West Cameron Area, South Addition at a distance of approximately 116 miles (187 km) from the Louisiana Coast, Gulf Gateway had a baseload capacity of 500 million cubic feet (14,000,000 m^{3}) per day with a peak capacity of 690 million cubic feet (20,000,000 m^{3}) per day. Unlike the four LNG terminals which were built in the US before it, Gulf Gateway utilized a special type of LNG carrier which can vaporize LNG on board the ship offshore rather than on land. In addition the vessel, the terminal consisted of a submerged turret loading (STL) buoy system, a new-build piled platform to support a gas custody transfer metering station, and associated pipelines to connect the subsea offloading buoy system to two pipeline grids.

== History ==
Offshore construction of Gulf Gateway commenced in August 2004 and was completed in February 2005 at a cost of approximately US$70 million. First cargo delivery occurred on March 17, 2005 from the world's first Energy Bridge Regasification Vehicle (EBRV), also known as a floating storage and regasification unit, the Excelsior.

The Gulf Gateway was in operation in the Gulf of Mexico during Hurricane Katrina and Hurricane Ike and was not affected by either storm.

The terminal was closed in 2011, due to the shift in the supply-demand balance in the United States from the proliferation of shale gas. The components of the terminal were removed for use at other similar terminals.
