= Peru LNG =

Peru LNG is a natural gas liquefaction plant in Pampa Melchorita, Peru, at the 170-kilometre (110 mi) of the South Pan American Highway in San Vicente de Cañete. It is the first natural gas liquefaction plant in South America.

The plant was officially inaugurated on 10 June 2010, and cost US$3.8 billion. It has a nominal capacity of 4.4 million tons of LNG per year. The production complex also consists of two storage tanks with a capacity of 130,000 cubic metres (4,600,000 cu ft) of LNG) each, a marine terminal, and a supply pipeline. The plant is supplied from Repsol YPF and Petrobras developed fields near the Camisea fields. The 34-inch (860 mm) supply pipeline runs 408 kilometres (254 mi) from Chinquintirca in Ayacucho area to the LNG plant.

The plant was designed and built by Chicago Bridge & Iron Company. The marine terminal was built by the CDB consortium (Saipem, Jan De Nul, and Odebrecht). The pipeline system was installed by Techint.

The LNG plant is operated by Peru LNG which is a consortium of Hunt Oil Company (50%), SK Energy (20%), Shell (20%), and Marubeni (10%).
