= Liquefied natural gas terminal =

Facility for processing shipments of the fossil fuel

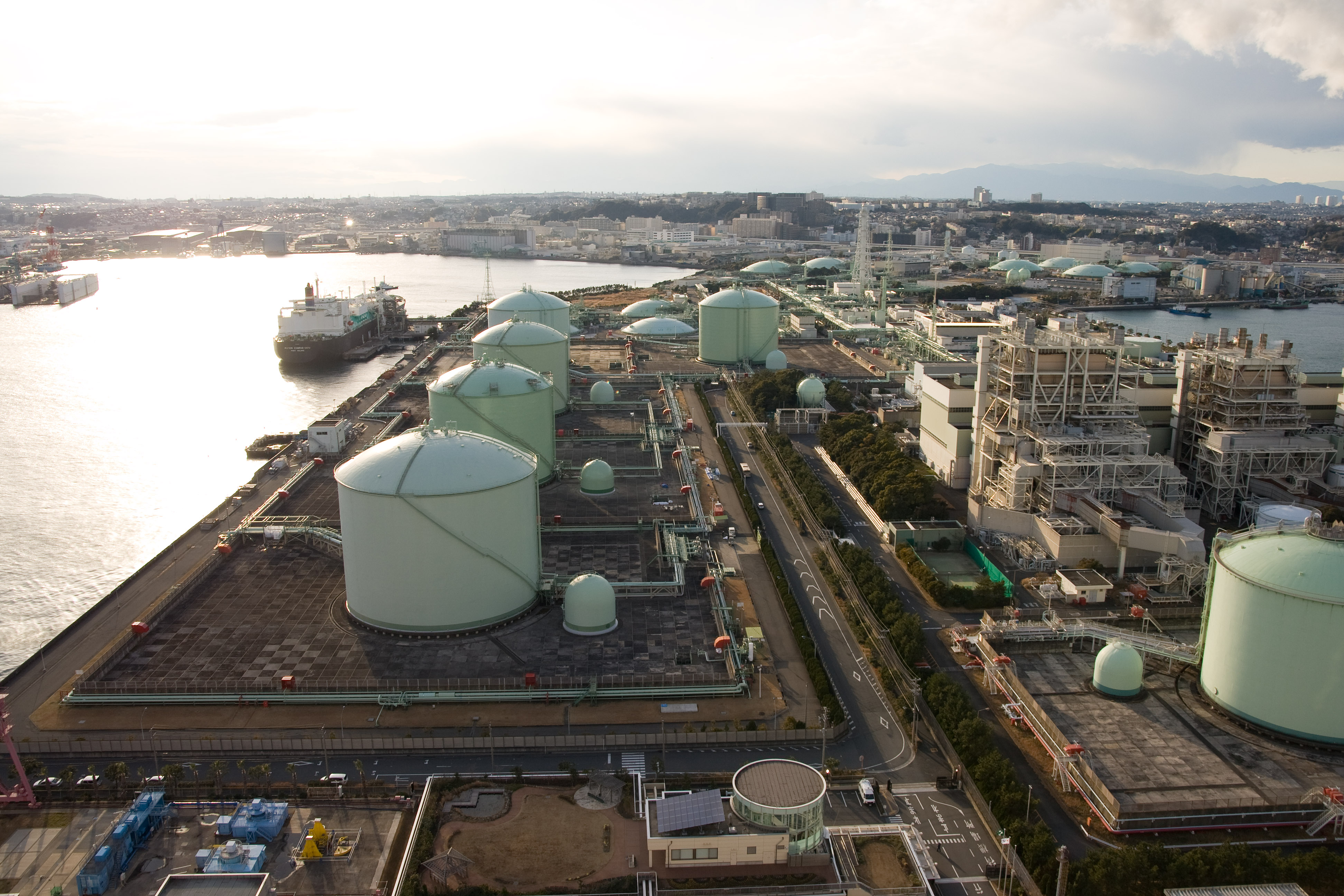
Negishi liquefied natural gas terminal, Yokohama, Japan

A liquefied natural gas terminal is a facility for managing the import and/or export of liquefied natural gas (LNG). It comprises equipment for loading and unloading of LNG cargo to/from ocean-going tankers, for transfer across the site, liquefaction, re-gasification, processing, storage, pumping, compression, and metering of LNG. LNG as a liquid is the most efficient way to transport natural gas over long distances, usually by sea.

== Types ==
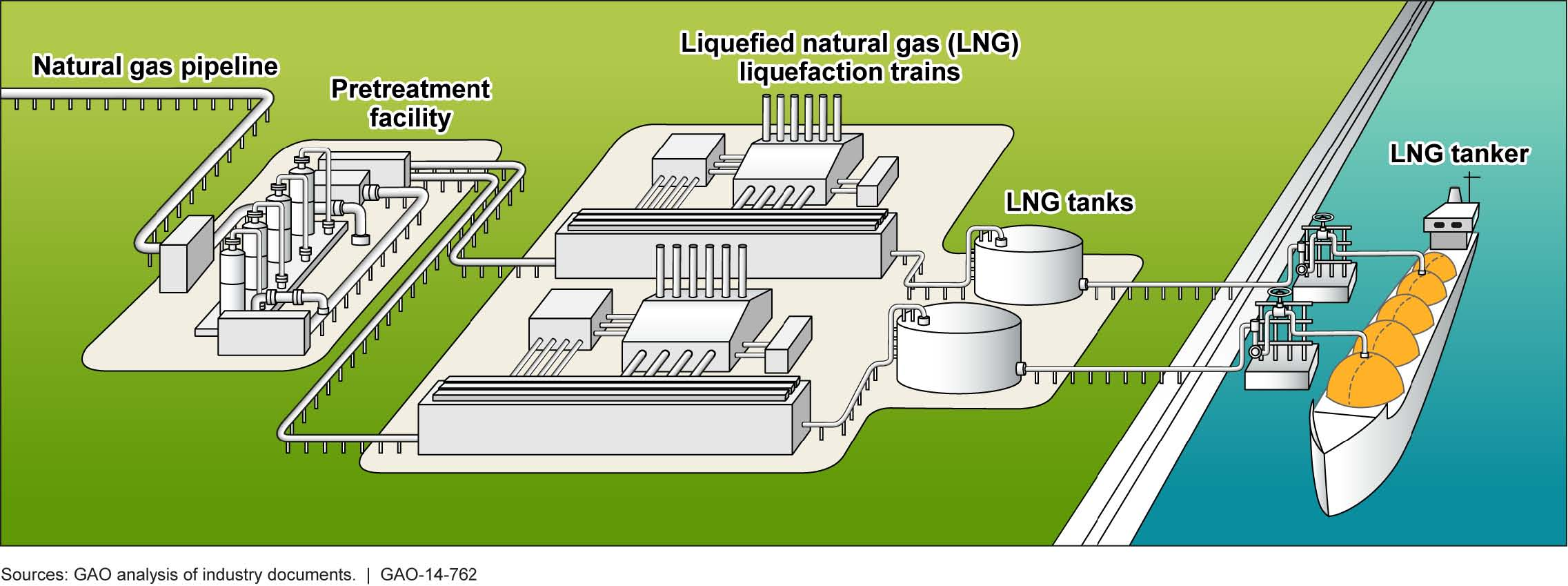
Liquefied natural gas export terminal

Liquefied natural gas terminals can be classed as: liquefaction terminals for the export of LNG or regasification terminals for the import of LNG. LNG terminals may combine both functions.

=== FSRU ===
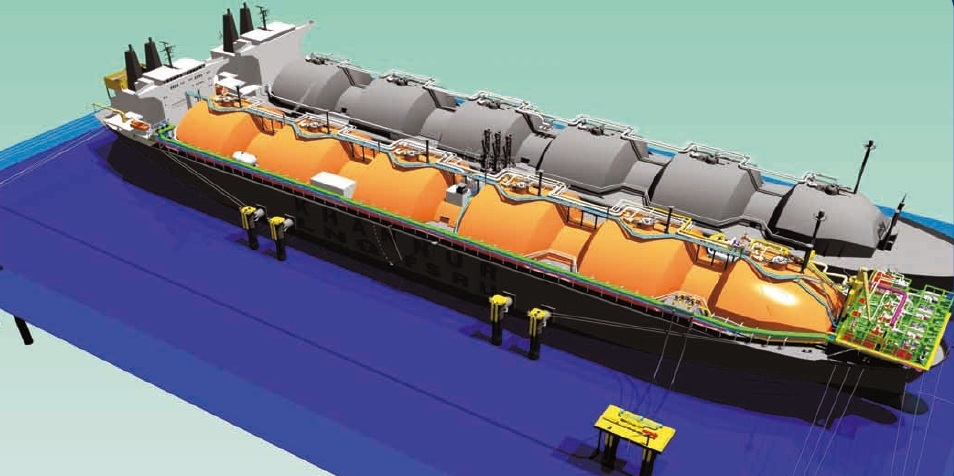
Floating storage and regasification unit (FSRU)

A floating storage and regasification unit (FSRU) is an LNG terminal whose main structure is a special ship moored near a port. As of January 2014 there are operating FSRUs in Brazil, Argentina, Kuwait, Israel, the UAE, Italy, Indonesia, China, Turkey and Lithuania.

== Terminal processes and equipment ==
=== Unloading and loading of LNG ===
Terminal facilities include jetties and piers with articulated loading/unloading arms for transferring LNG between ship and shore. It also includes the piping used to transport LNG between the loading arms and the storage and processing facilities at the terminal. LNG is kept at about −162 °C (−260 °F) to maintain it in a liquid state. Conventional carbon steels are brittle at this temperature. Therefore, special metals are used for this low-temperature cryogenic service where metal is in contact with LNG. Appropriate materials include aluminium alloys with 3 to 5 percent magnesium and high nickel steels containing 9 per cent nickel. The loading/unloading arms and pipework are insulated to prevent heat gain from the air to minimise the vaporization of LNG. Tankers being loaded with LNG displace the vapour volume in their tanks, this gas is routed to boil-off or gas recovery storage tanks. Gas may then be compressed and fed into the local gas network, or it may be routed to the liquefaction plant and returned as liquid to the LNG storage tanks.

=== Pier ===
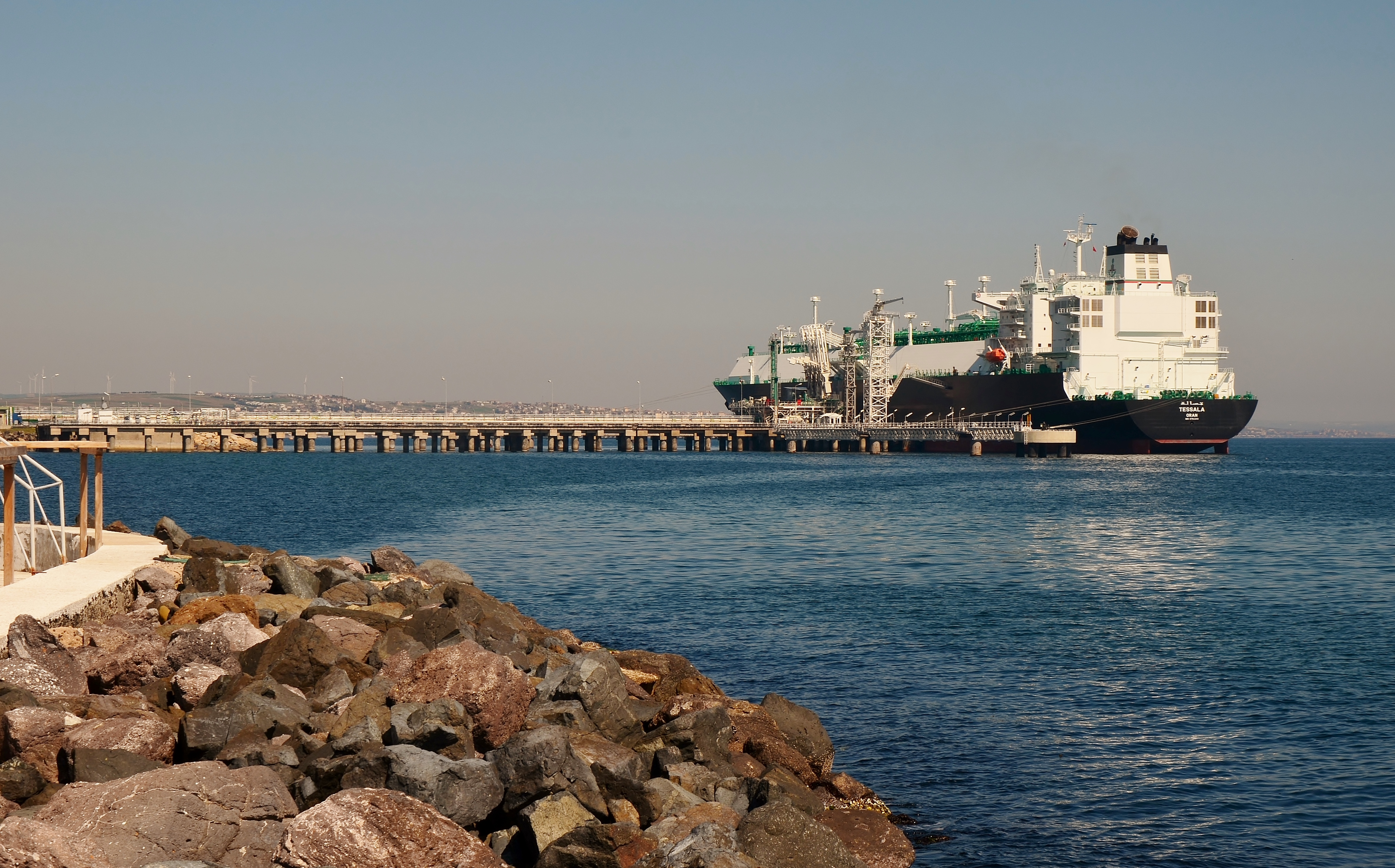
LNG tanker at Marmara Ereğlisi LNG Storage Facility

A LNG pier is a specialized kind of working pier designed for the loading and offloading of liquefied natural gas to/from ships and shore based tanks.

A LNG pier could accommodate LNG carriers of a range of sizes. They may be capable of handling LNG tankers of 70,000 to 217,000 cubic metres (m^{3}) cargo capacity (Q-Flex); or tankers of 125,000 to 266,000 m^{3} cargo capacity (Q-Max). The pier would have at least two insulated lines, one for loading and/or unloading LNG and one for vapor supply or recovery as the vapor space above the LNG changes as the cargo is transferred. Ship-based or shore-based cryogenic pumps are used to transfer the LNG to/from the LNG storage tanks on shore.

Some of these piers are very long, up to 4,000 feet (1,200 m), in order to reach to the depth of water required to accommodate LNG tanker traffic.

=== Storage of LNG ===
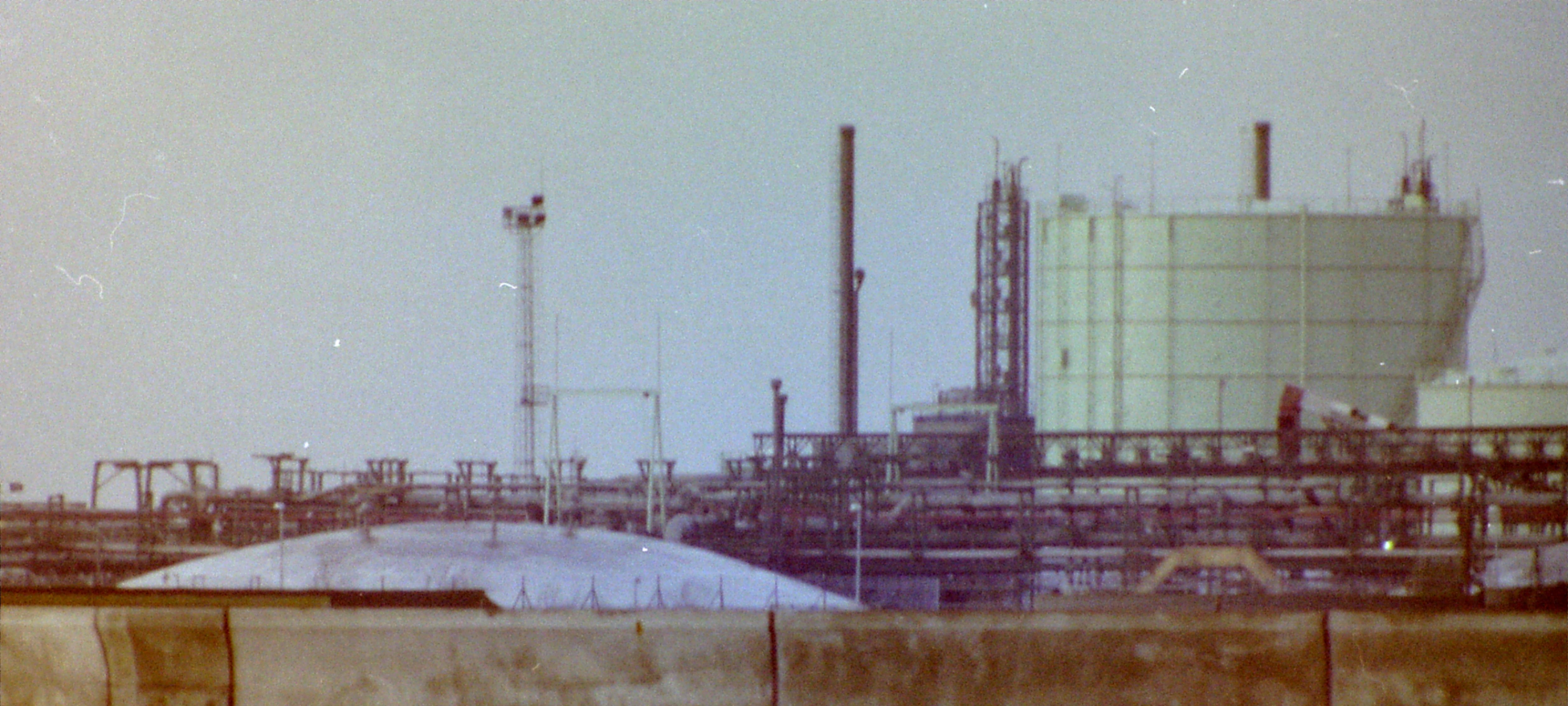
Liquefied Natural Gas terminal Canvey Island UK

The LNG flows through the pipelines that connect the loading arms on the jetty to storage tanks. Tanks are usually of double wall construction, with the inner tank constructed of low-temperature alloy. This is surrounded by insulation to reduce heat gain and an outer tank of conventional steel or pre-stressed reinforced concrete. In-ground LNG tanks are also used; these are lined or unlined tanks beneath ground level. The low temperature of the LNG freezes the soil and provides effective containment. The tank is sealed with an aluminium alloy roof at ground level. Historically there have been problems with some unlined tanks with the escape of LNG into fissures, the gradual expansion of extent of the frozen ground, and ice heave which have limited the operational capability of in-ground tanks. All piping connected to the LNG tanks, whether above ground or in-ground, are routed through the top of the vessel. This militates against loss of containment in the event of a piping breach. Tanks may be situated within a bund wall to contain the LNG in the event of a rupture of the tank. This is usually a steel or concrete wall surrounding the tank to half the tank height.

Heat transfer into the tanks causes vaporisation of the LNG. This boil-off gas is routed to a boil-off gas holder. Gas may be returned to an unloading ship to make up the vapor space volume. Alternatively it may be compressed and fed into the local gas network, or it may be routed to the liquefaction plant and returned as liquid to the LNG storage tanks

=== Regasification ===
Regasification is the process of converting LNG from a liquid to a gaseous state. This requires significant quantities of heat energy to supply the enthalpy of vaporization of LNG and to heat it from -162 °C to about 0 to 10 °C (32 to 50 °F) for introduction into a pipeline. Gas may be sent to a main gas transmission system, which typically operates at 70–100 bar. NGL is first pumped as liquid to this pressure. A series of heat exchangers are used to regasify the LNG. These may include submerged combustion vaporisers, or an intermediate fluid exchanger (using propane or other fluids), or the use of waste heat from a nearby plant such as a power station. Final heating of the gas may use air or seawater heat exchangers.

To meet the quality specification of the gas transmission system, the outgoing gas may need to be analysed and enriched or diluted. Propane may be added to enrich the gas and nitrogen to ballast or dilute it. Prior to distribution into a high-pressure transmission system, the regasified natural gas is metered and dosed with a stenching or odorizing agent.

=== Liquefaction ===
At times of low demand, gas may be withdrawn from a transmission system and liquefied and stored. There are several proprietary systems that are used to liquefy natural gas and turn it into LNG. For full details of processes, see liquefied natural gas.

== See also ==
- List of LNG terminals
- LNG carrier
- LNG pier
- LNG storage tank
