= Regasification =

Process of converting liquefied natural gas

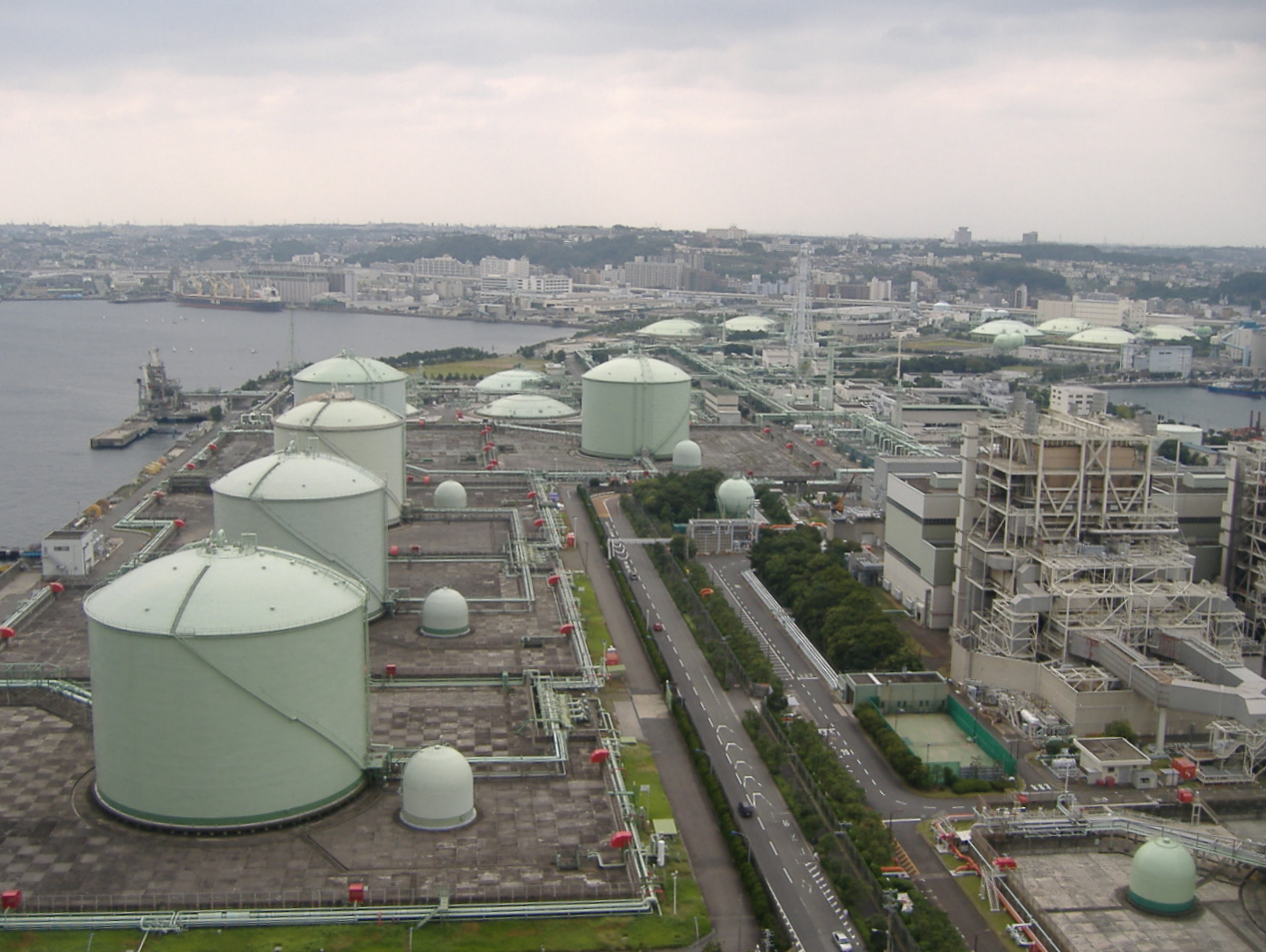
Regasification terminal of Tokyo Gas in Yokohama

Regasification is a process of converting liquefied natural gas (LNG) at −162 °C (−260 °F) temperature back to natural gas at atmospheric temperature. LNG gasification plants can be located on land as well as on floating barges, i.e. a Floating Storage and Regasification Unit (FSRU). Floating barge mounted plants have the advantage that they can be towed to new offshore locations for better usage in response to changes in the business environment. In a conventional regasification plant, LNG is heated by sea water to convert it to natural gas / methane gas.

== Byproducts ==
In addition to regasification, many valuable industrial byproducts can be produced using cold energy of LNG. Cold energy of LNG utilisation, for extracting liquid oxygen and nitrogen gas from air, makes LNG-regasification plants more viable when they are located near integrated steel plants and/or urea plants. Cold energy of LNG usage in lieu of massive and energy intensive cryogenic refrigeration units in natural-gas processing plants is also more viable economically. The natural gas processed with cold energy of LNG and the imported LNG can be readily injected into a conventional natural gas distribution system to reach the ultimate consumers.

The cold energy of LNG can be used for cooling the exhaust fluid of the gas turbine which is working in closed joule cycle with Argon gas as fluid. Thus near 100% conversion efficiency to electricity is achieved for the LNG/natural gas consumed by the gas turbine as its exhaust heat is fully used/absorbed for the gasification of LNG.

However, the abundant availability of natural gas, and the mature technology and its acceptability in using the LNG directly (without regasification) in road and rail vehicles would lead to lesser demand for LNG regasification plants.

== See also ==
- Gas-to-liquids
- Existing regasification terminals
- Liquid air
- CNG carrier
- Cryogenic energy storage
