= Infinite Energy (company) =

Infinite Energy is a retail and wholesale energy provider based in Florida. The company provides natural gas to homes and businesses as a retailer in Georgia, Florida, Ohio and New Jersey and electricity in Texas. The company also serves as an energy wholesaler in 22 states. In 2015, the company took over naming rights of Gwinnett Center, located in Duluth, Georgia, calling it Infinite Energy Center.

== History ==
Co-founders Darin Cook and Rich Blaser launched Infinite Energy in Gainesville, Florida, in 1994. The company started as a wholesale natural gas provider to Florida utilities and industrial customers. As retail businesses in some parts of the Florida market also got the ability to choose their own providers, Infinite Energy began serving them as well.

The company continued to expand its retail service area, moving into Georgia next when the state restructured its natural gas market. Today, Infinite Energy is one of only two original providers still operating there. By 2005, the company had also expanded into New Jersey. And in 2010, it began providing electricity in Texas. In 2019, the company expanded its service area to Ohio.

Infinite Energy employs more than 300 people. In 2016, the company made headlines for raising its minimum wage to $15 an hour.

Florida Trend has recognized Infinite Energy multiple times as one of Florida’s best workplaces. In 2018, Inc. Magazine, a national publication, ranked Infinite Energy as one of the best places to work in the U.S. And Outside Magazine, another national publication, has recognized the company multiple years running as one of the country's best workplaces for its emphasis on employee well-being.

== Infinite Energy Center ==
In 2015, Infinite Energy bought naming rights to the Gwinnett Center in a 20-year deal for $18 million. Infinite Energy Center, as it’s now known, is located in Duluth, Georgia, just a few minutes outside of Atlanta.

The Gwinnett Convention and Visitors Bureau runs the center, which features a 13,000-seat arena, a 50,000-square-foot exhibit hall, a 21,600-square-foot grand ballroom and a 708-seat theater.

In addition to being the home of the ECHL’s Atlanta Gladiators and National League Lacrosse’s Georgia Swarm, the venue accommodates many concerts, performances, tradeshows, conventions and meetings each year.

The same year Infinite Energy took over naming rights of the center, the company pledged to give back $5 to the schools in Gwinnett County (where IEC is located) each year for every customer it has there.
