= Costa Azul LNG =

Location
- Country: Mexico
- Location: Near Ensenada, Baja California, Mexico
- Coordinates: 31.982°N 116.836°W

Details
- Opened: 2008
- Land area: 100 acres (0.40 km^{2})
- No. of berths: 1 up to Q Max

Statistics
- Annual cargo tonnage: Up to 7.6 million tons a year.
- Website http://www.energiacostaazul.com.mx http://www.sempralng.com

Costa Azul LNG is a sea port and natural gas processing center, located 15 miles north of Ensenada, Baja California, Mexico. Opened in 2008, the terminal was able to import up to one billion cubic feet of natural gas per day. This is the first liquefied natural gas (LNG) terminal on the North America west coast. LNG carrier ships capable of holding up to 220,000m^{3} of LNG can dock in the deep water port off the coast to unload LNG. The natural gas from the terminal is used to produce electricity and is fed by pipe lines to factories. The longest pipeline runs north, to the United States. Sempra Energy is a partner in the port with PEMEX. The LNG ship Al Safliya was the first ship to port and unload at Costa Azul. The Al Safliya is a 210,000 cubic meter LNG ship, its LNG was from Qatar. The other Mexican LNG Terminal in the Pacific Ocean is at Manzanillo, Colima, the Manzanillo LNG Terminal.

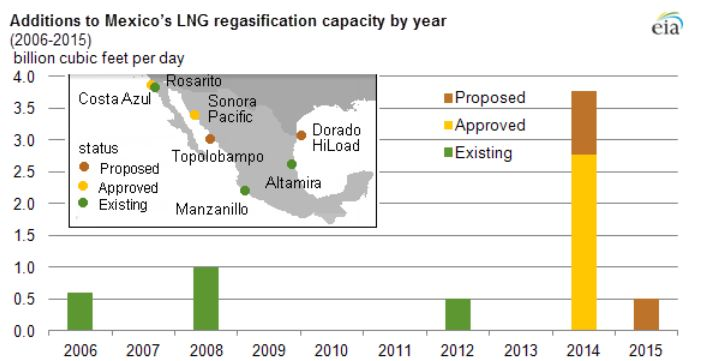
Mexican natural gas imports to US Chart, 2013, Costa Azul only West Coast Port

== Details ==
Contract to build the port was made in 2004. The port as a man made breakwater jetty. The port has two full-containment storage tanks each holding 160,000 cubic meters. The port can receive from ships 28 million cubic metres (1 billion cubic feet) per day. The port was built by: Techint SA de CV of Mexico, Black & Veatch of Overland Park, KS, Mitsubishi Heavy Industries of Tokyo, Vinci Construction Grands Projects of France and Freyssinet: LNG Tank post-tensioning. A man made 625 meter breakwater was built to project ships docked off shore. To minimize the ecological impact, some sea life was relocated and a plant nursery was built on site. The port has one berth that can handle up to a Q-Max ship. A Q-Max is the largest classification of LNG carrier; such ships can hold up to 266,000 cubic metres (9.4 million cubic feet) of natural gas.

== Usage ==
As of 2013, Costa Azul LNG terminal was not used at its full capacity of 1 billion cubic feet (28 million cubic metres) per day. Shipments of LNG from the Middle East and Indonesia went to Asia as demand and prices were higher there. Also import demand was lower then, as the Kern River Pipeline and Ruby Pipeline were feeding the Western and Southwestern United States.

Originally built as an import facility, the facility was adapted to enable exports. The facility is expected to begin commercial export operations in Spring 2026. It has a design capacity of exporting 3.25 million tons per year (Mt/y).

== See also ==
- Gas carriers
- Q-Flex
- List of gas carriers
- List of tankers
- Prelude FLNG
- CNG
- Mozah
