= Elba Island (Georgia) =

Island in Chatham County, Georgia, United States

Coordinates: 32°05′28″N 81°00′01″W

Elba Island is an island in the Savannah River, near the US port city of Savannah, Georgia, on the Atlantic Ocean. It functions as an import and export facility for liquefied natural gas. The island lies five miles downstream from the city of Savannah, and is part of Chatham County, Georgia. Its name comes from the Mediterranean island of Elba.

In the early 1970s, the US energy company Sonat built an import and storage facility for liquefied natural gas (LNG) on the island. Another large project, completed in 2020, expanded the facility to liquefy and export natural gas. In that project, which cost about $2 billion, Kinder Morgan (a large US energy company) constructed ten liquefaction units.

== LNG terminal ==
Liquefied natural gas (LNG) is used to transport natural gas in a highly compressed form. It is commonly used to allow shipments by ocean vessels. LNG is maintained at −260 °F or colder and is 600 times as dense as air-temperature natural gas.

=== LNG import and regassification terminal ===
Elba Island is an existing LNG import terminal located on Elba Island, in Chatham County, Georgia. It was built by Sonat, Inc., based in Birmingham, Alabama, for its Southern Natural Gas division. The initial authorization for the Elba Island facility was issued in 1972. LNG shipments ceased during the first half of 1980. On March 16, 2000, the project received Commission authorization to re-commission and renovate the LNG facilities.

=== LNG liquefaction and export terminal ===
On June 2, 2016, the Federal Energy Regulatory Commission (FERC) gave approval for the Elba Liquefaction Project. The approximate $2 billion project will be constructed and operated at the existing Elba Island LNG Terminal near Savannah, Georgia. The first of 10 liquefaction units is expected to be placed in service in the second quarter of 2018, with the remaining nine units coming online before the end of 2018. This project is supported by a 20-year contract with Shell.

In 2012, the Elba Liquefaction Project received authorization from the Department of Energy to export to Free Trade Agreement (FTA) countries. An application to export to non-FTA countries is pending, but is not required for the project to move ahead. The liquefaction project is expected to have a total capacity of approximately 2.5 million tonnes per year of LNG for export, equivalent to approximately 350,000 Mcf per day of natural gas.

Kinder Morgan is expanding Elba with newly designed modular units produced by Shell, which has subscribed to 100 percent of the facility's export capacity of 2.5 million tons per year for 20 years. Kinder Morgan purchased Shell's 49 percent equity interest in the project summer 2015.

LNG tanker ships used for export typically range from 1.5 to 3.7 BCF (billion cubic feet) equivalent capacity (50,000 to 170,000 cubic meters), thus the Elba LNG terminal should be able to export approximately one tanker per week, depending on the capacity of the tanker. Larger tankers would take approximately two weeks of LNG production to fill.

Alternatively, LNG bunker fueling vessels used to fuel cruise liners and container ships typically hold 4,000 to 20,000 cubic meters (1 million to 5 million gallons). Elba Island will produce approximately 10,000 cubic meters (2.5 million gallons) per day of LNG and Shell may use some or all of that production to satisfy US LNG marine fuel demand. Shell has announced they will have a 4,000-cubic-meter (1 million gallon) LNG bunker fueling vessel operating on the US southeast coast, but it has not said where the needed LNG would be sourced.
