= Mozah =

Q-Max LNG carrier

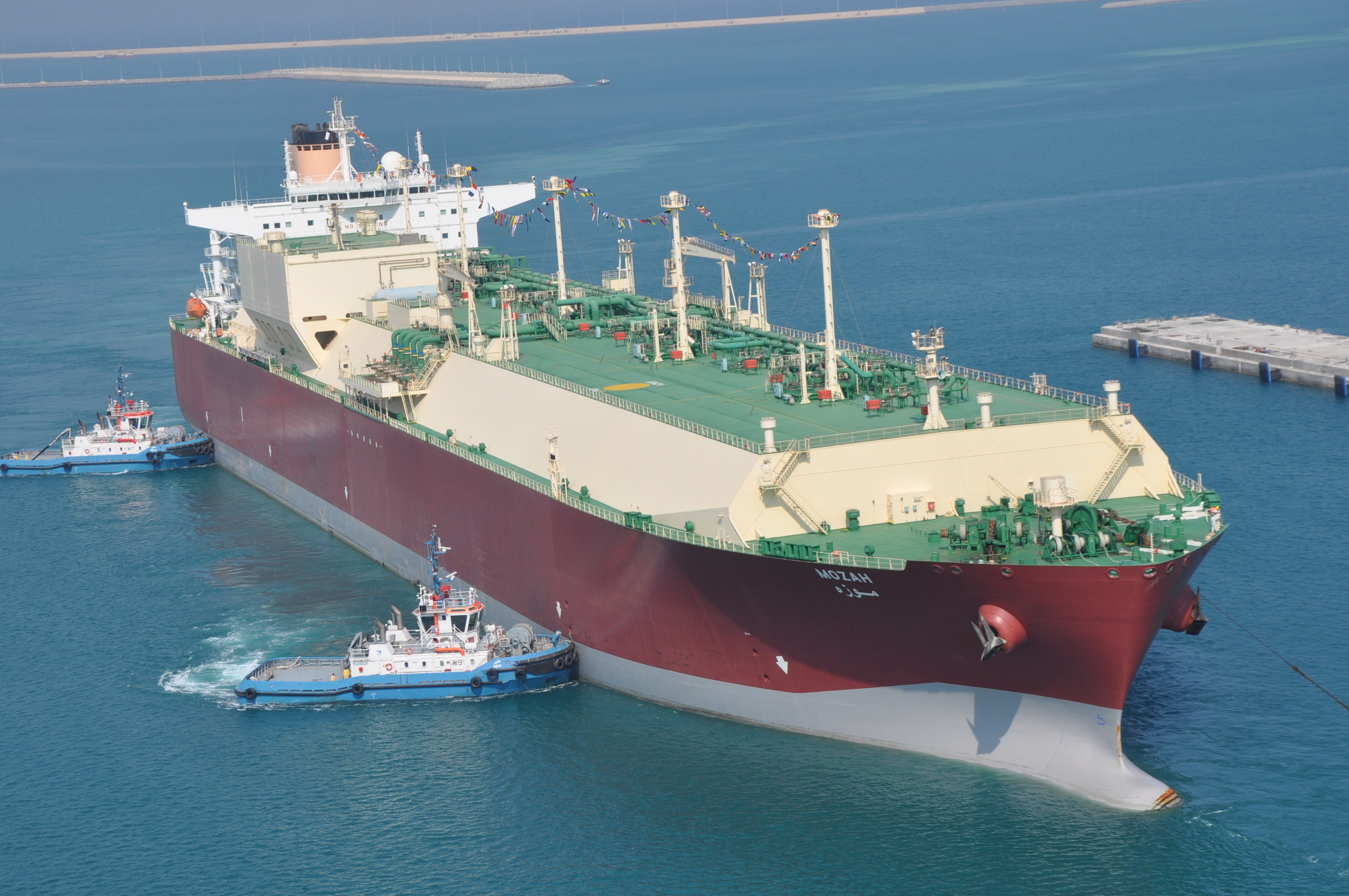
- LNG Carrier Mozah

History
- Name: Mozah
- Operator: Qatargas
- Port of registry: Marshall Islands
- Builder: Samsung Heavy Industries
- Launched: 10 November 2007
- Identification: Call sign: V7PD7; IMO number: 9337755; MMSI number: 538003212
- Status: in active service

General characteristics
- Type: LNG carrier
- Tonnage: 163,922 GT; 128,900 DWT
- Length: 345 m (1,132 ft)
- Beam: 53 m (174 ft)
- Draft: 12.0 m (39.4 ft)
- Installed power: 43,540 kW (58,390 hp) at 91 rpm
- Propulsion: 2 x MAN B&W 7S70ME-C diesel engines
- Speed: 19.5 knots (36.1 km/h; 22.4 mph) (maximum); 19.0 knots (35.2 km/h; 21.9 mph) (cruising)
- Capacity: 266,000 m^{3} (9,400,000 cu ft)

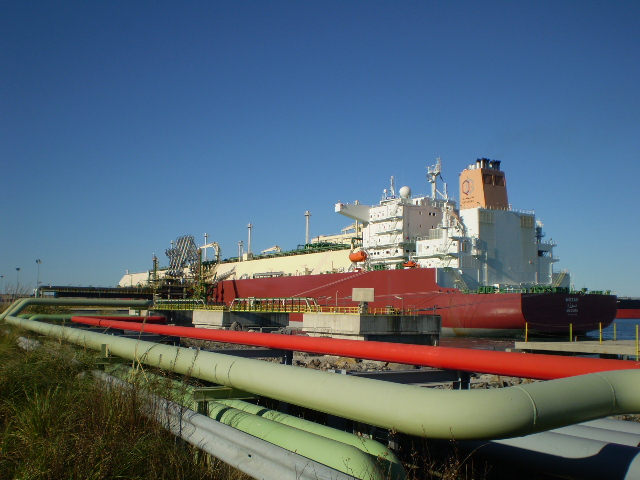
Mozah at the port of Bilbao

Mozah is a Q-Max LNG carrier operated by Qatargas II. The vessel was built in 2008 by Samsung Heavy Industries and is tied with her sister ships for the largest LNG carrier in the world. The vessel is part of a contract for 14 same-size ships with maximum particulars to berth at Ras Laffan terminal in Qatar.

The ship is named after Sheikha Moza bint Nasser, wife of Sheikh Hamad bin Khalifa Al Thani who was then the Emir of Qatar.

== Design ==
The Mozah has a length of 345 m (1,132 ft), a beam of 53 m (174 ft) and a summer draft of 12.0 m (39.4 ft). The large size and capacity form her efficiency and profitability. The deadweight of Mozah vessel is 128,900 DWT and the gross tonnage is 163,922 GT. Such tonnage and size allow the cargo ship to carry 266,000 cubic metres (9,400,000 cu ft) of liquefied natural gas with a temperature of −163 °C (−261 °F). The total cargo capacity of the vessel is equivalent to 161,994,000 cubic metres (5.7208×10^{9} cu ft) of gaseous natural gas at room temperature.

== Engineering ==
Mozah is driven by 2 MAN B&W 7S70ME-C two-stroke low speed diesel engines, electronically controlled. The engines have a total output power of 43,540 kW (58,390 hp) at 91 rpm.

== Registry ==
Mozah is owned and operated by Qatargas 2. The vessel has MMSI 538003212, IMO number 9337755 and call sign V7PD7.

== Operations ==
Mozah carried the 10,000th LNG cargo load from Qatar, on May 9, 2016.

It is operated by Nakilat.

== See also ==
- LNG carrier
- MV Gastor
