= MV Gastor =

LNG carrier (1976–2015)

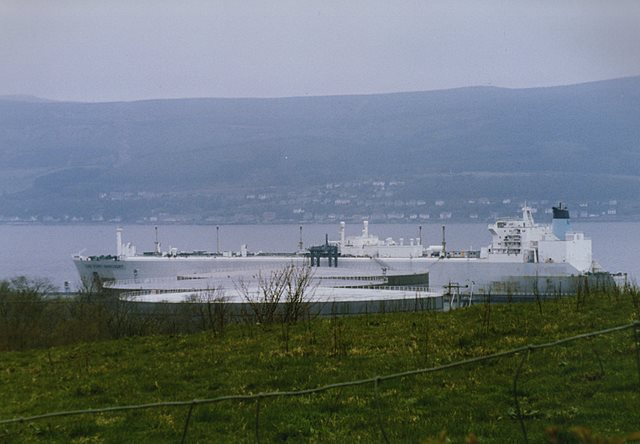
- Port Harcourt at Inverkip Power Station jetty in 1988

History
- Name: Gastor (1976–1993); LNG Lagos (1993–2015)
- Owner: Bonny Gas Transport (1993–)
- Port of registry: Hamilton, Bermuda
- Builder: Chantiers de l'Atlantique, Saint-Nazaire, France
- Yard number: A.26
- Launched: 17 May 1975
- Completed: 1 January 1976
- In service: 1993–
- Out of service: 2015
- Identification: IMO number: 7360124; Call sign: ZCAK8
- Fate: Scrapped 16 October 2018

General characteristics
- Type: LNG carrier
- Tonnage: 81,472 GT; 24,442 NT; 68,206 DWT
- Length: 275 m (902 ft 3 in)
- Beam: 42 m (137 ft 10 in)
- Draft: 12.9 m (42 ft 4 in)
- Depth: 26.14 m (85 ft 9 in)
- Propulsion: Steam turbine (25,024 kW (33,558 hp)); Single shaft with fixed pitch propeller
- Speed: 19.7 knots (36.5 km/h; 22.7 mph)
- Capacity: Six tanks, 122,000 m^{3} (4,300,000 cu ft)

Gastor and Nestor were two LNG carriers built at the French shipyard Chantiers de l'Atlantique in Saint-Nazaire. Although delivered in 1976 both ships only entered real service in 1993, after their sale to Bonny Gas Transport Bermuda Shell, a subsidiary of Nigeria LNG Limited. Under their original names (Gastor and Nestor), the ships never transported any cargo.

== History ==
When first built in 1976–1977, the ships were sister ships owned by different companies: the Dutch Nedlloyd and US based Ocean. They were built at the Chantiers de l'Atlantique shipyard of St. Nazaire, France. After completion they did not go into service for nearly two decades and were both laid-up for years in the Scottish Loch Striven as there was insufficient work for them to cause their owners to place them into operation into the LNG transport market.

A few years after completion it was discovered that there was a construction error in the insulation of the huge gas tanks. These LNG carriers store their cargo at near atmospheric pressure and this requires that the gas is cooled down to the boiling temperature of LNG: −162 °C (−260 °F). The cargo is at this temperature when loaded and then the temperature is maintained at this level using insulated tanks and, over time, some of the gas vaporizes which keeps the cargo cool despite the (intentionally low) incoming heat flux from the surrounding environment in the ship and the ocean. Both ships returned to the shipyard for repairs and then returned to storage in Loch Striven as there was still no work for them. The building costs of each ship was €60 million; they were sold in 1991 for approximately €15 million each and came in service around 1993.

At the time these ships were the largest ships ever built at the Chantier d'Atlantique shipyard and a special large drydock was built for this project. After the completion of several large tankers in the 1970s this drydock was not used again until the yard was commissioned to build the new ocean liner RMS Queen Mary 2 by Cunard.

== Gastor ==
Gastor was built for the Dutch company Nederlandse Scheepvaart Unie, part of the shipping-company Nedlloyd. (Later Nedlloyd and P&O joined forces and formed P&O Nedlloyd specializing in container shipping until this company was sold to A. P. Moller-Maersk Group or Maersk for short).

The construction-number for the yard was 26 and the IMO number is 7360124.

The ship was built to transport LNG from the newly discovered gas-fields in Algeria to the West-European markets via the Dutch port of Delfzijl. Due to economic development at the time and the after effects of the 1973 oil crisis this project never materialized and after completion the ship was laid up in Loch Striven.

=== LNG Lagos ===
In 1993 Gastor was sold and renamed LNG Lagos and finally entered service under the new owner Bonny Gas Transport - Shell Bermuda. The ship carries cargo for that company to and from Nigeria. Before entering service the -now- LNG Lagos was fitted with a new bridge system by Litton Marine services (part of Sperry Marine Northrop Grumman) at the Sobrena shipyard in Brest (now Damen Shipyard). The last registered position of the ship was registered in 2015 in the Java Sea and since then no further AIS positions were registered. It was reported sold to Sinokor Merchant Marine before being scrapped in 2018. At the time it was the oldest LNG carrier afloat.

== MV Nestor ==
MV Nestor was commissioned by shipping-company Ocean Group from Liverpool. This ship was built to transport gas from Indonesia to the United States but suffered the same fate as Gastor: being laid-up in Loch Striven between 1976–1993, except for a quick return to the shipyard in the mid 1980s when a construction/design error was being repaired. Similar to the Gastor, the isolation of the main gas tanks was not built according to the design and was repaired by the shipyard. Nestor had yard-number B26 and the IMO number was 7360136.

=== LNG Port Harcourt ===
Just like Gastor, Nestor was also sold to Shell Bermuda/Bonny Gas Transport and was renamed to LNG Port Harcourt. LNG Port Harcourt was also used for the Shell Nigeria project in Nigeria until being put up for sale in 2015. It was briefly renamed the LNG East Energy after sale. Along with its sister ship, it was scrapped in 2018.

== See also ==
- Largest LNG carrier Mozah
