= Hippolite Amadi =

Nigerian engineer

- Born: Nigeria
- Scientific career
- Institutions: Imperial College London
- Thesis: Glenohumeral joint kinematics and ligament loading (2006)

Hippolite Amadi is a Nigerian engineer who is a visiting professor at Imperial College London. His research involves the development of engineering tools to support newborn babies. He was awarded the 2023 Nigeria Prize for Science.

== Early life and education ==
Amadi started his education in Nigeria, where he studied mechanical and production engineering. After completing his degree, he spent ten years developing engineering solutions for medicine. He completed his undergraduate medical degree and doctorate at Imperial College London. His doctoral research spanned orthopaedic research, with a focus on biomechanics. He became concerned that neonates were dying, and dedicated his career to protecting young babies.

== Research and career ==
Amadi teaches across over twenty tertiary hospitals in Nigeria. Newborn deaths mainly occur during the first 7 days of life in Nigeria. Amadi developed a solar powered non-invasive ventilatior for premature infants. The apparatus can be used for patients with acute respiratory distress syndrome. In 2005, he started working with Chief Medical Directors across Nigeria and created a fleet of neonatal incubators.

In 2023 he was awarded the Nigeria Prize for Science.

== Selected publications ==
- Amadi HO, Gupte CM, Lie DT, McDermott ID, Amis AA, Bull AM (19 August 2008). "A biomechanical study of the meniscofemoral ligaments and their contribution to contact pressure reduction in the knee". Knee Surgery, Sports Traumatology, Arthroscopy. 16 (11): 1004–1008. doi:10.1007/S00167-008-0592-0. ISSN 0942-2056. PMID 18712357. Wikidata Q81800586.
- Amadi HO, Olateju EK, Alabi P, Kawuwa MB, Ibadin MO, Osibogun AO (2 May 2015). "Neonatal hyperthermia and thermal stress in low- and middle-income countries: a hidden cause of death in extremely low-birthweight neonates". Paediatrics and International Child Health. 35 (3): 273–281. doi:10.1179/2046905515Y.0000000030. ISSN 2046-9047. PMID 25936414. Wikidata Q38871801.
- Amadi HO, Mokuolu OA, Adimora GN, Pam SD, Etawo US, Ohadugha CO, Adesiyun OO (1 September 2007). "Digitally recycled incubators: better economic alternatives to modern systems in low-income countries". Annals of Tropical Paediatrics. 27 (3): 207–214. doi:10.1179/146532807X220325. ISSN 0272-4936. PMID 17716449. Wikidata Q39809781.
