= Babs Omotowa =

Nigerian energy executive

Babs Jolayemi “Babs” Omotowa is a Nigerian energy executive and seasoned global business leader. He served as the Managing Director and CEO of Nigeria LNG Limited from 2011 to 2016, and subsequently held senior leadership roles at Shell, including Global Vice President, Upstream Exploration & Production. Beyond his corporate career, he has contributed to international governance through board and advisory positions, been appointed Founding President of the Nigerian University of Technology & Management (NUTM), and holds multiple independent directorships in major corporations

== Early life ==
Babatunde “Babs” Omotowa was born in Kogi State, Nigeria, at the onset of the Civil War in Nigeria and grew up in the middle belt, in an agrarian environment.

== Education ==
Babs began his educational journey at Baboko Primary School in Ilorin, Kwara State, Nigeria. He completed his secondary school education at Federal Government College, Ilorin, Kwara State, also. Babs earned his Bachelor of Science in Industrial Chemistry at the University of Ilorin, Kwara State, Nigeria, in 1988. He studied further at the same university and obtained a Master of Business Administration degree. Babs earned a second master’s degree in Strategic Supply Chain Management from the University of Leicester, United Kingdom, in 2002. Babs earned an honorary doctorate degree (Hon) in science from Kwara State University alongside Aisha Buhari in 2021.

Babs is pursuing a doctorate degree in business administration at Heriot-Watt University in Edinburgh, Scotland, with a focus on environmental, social, and governance issues. He has also attended several executive education programs, including the General Management Program at Harvard Business School in 2003.

In 2004, he obtained a Lean Six Sigma Black Belt certification at IBM. He later returned to Harvard Business School for governance-related programs, including Audit Committees in a New Era of Governance in 2023 and Compensation Committees: New Challenges, New Solutions in 2024. Babs earned a diploma from the Chartered Institute of Procurement & Supply (CIPS) in the United Kingdom in 1997 and was awarded fellowship status in 2008.

== Career Life ==
Babs started his working career as a College Tutor in 1989 at Bishop Smith Memorial College, Ilorin, Kwara State, Nigeria. In 1992 he joined the Nigerian Security Printing and Minting Company (NSPMC) in Lagos, Nigeria, as a Commercial Officer. He then joined Shell Petroleum Development Company (SPDC) in 1993 as a Management Trainee in the SPDC Western division operations in Warri, Delta State. He proceeded to Shell UK in Aberdeen in January 2000 as a Business Improvement Manager and later appointed Regional Supply and Marine Manager across UK, Holland and Norway and subsequently became the Production Superintendent responsible for the Pierce Field in the Central North Sea.

He returned to Nigeria in July 2006 as General Manager Supply Chain Management for Shell’s Offshore business at Shell Nigeria Exploration and Production Company Limited and later across all Shell Companies in Nigeria (SPDC/SNEPCO). In 2008 he was appointed a Director of SPDC and later appointed Vice President for Shell companies across Africa, responsible for Infrastructure, Logistics, Health Safety and Environment. He was Non-Executive Director of West African Gas Pipeline (WAPCO) in 2010 and Non-Executive Director of Nigerian Economic Summit Group.

The Nigerian Economic Summit Group (NESG) is that is globally competitive on a sustainable basis(2012 - 2016). In December 2011, he became Chief Executive Officer and Managing Director (CEO/MD) of Nigeria LNG Limited (NLNG) a liquefied natural gas plant on Bonny Island, Nigeria and Vice President for Bonny Gas Transport Bermuda. Babs was elected as the Global President of CIPS, leading the organization from 2014 to 2015. Babs Omotowa, the former managing director of Nigeria LNG Limited between December 2011 and September 2016

In 2016 Babs was appointed into Royal Dutch Shell Upstream Leadership Team at the company’s head office in Hague, Netherland as a Global Vice President covering Climate Change, Environment, Process and Personal Safety, across 40 countries. Babs is the Founding Chairman, Advisory Board of Montserrado Oil and Gas Limited, registered in Netherlands and with Oil, Gas and Infrastructure projects in emerging markets including in West Africa and South America.

He is Independent Director of Pearlhill Technologies, Idaho, USA, a Nuclear, Carbon Capture and Storage technology company since 1 October 2019. He also sits on the board of trustees of JT Omotowa Foundation (JTOF Foundation). Babs Omotowa retired as a Non-Executive Director of Chemical and Allied Products Plc (CAP Plc) on June 5, 2025.
