= Q-Flex =

Liquefied natural gas carrier ship

Class overview
- Name: Q-Flex
- Builders: Hyundai Heavy Industries, Daewoo Shipbuilding & Marine Engineering Company, Samsung Heavy Industries
- Operators: Qatar Gas Transport Company (Nakilat)
- Built: 2007 – present
- In service: 16
- Planned: 31
- Canceled: -
- Active: 16
- Lost: -
- Retired: -
- Preserved: -

General characteristics
- Type: LNG carrier
- Capacity: 165,000 m^{3} – 216,000 m^{3}

Q-Flex is a type of ship, specifically a membrane type liquefied natural gas carrier.

== Technical description ==
Q-Flex vessels are propelled by two slow speed diesel engines, which are claimed to be more efficient and environmentally friendly than traditional steam turbines. Q-Flex carriers are equipped with an on-board re-liquefaction system to handle the boil-off gas, liquefy it and return the LNG to the cargo tanks. The on-board re-liquefaction system reduces LNG losses, which produces economic and environmental benefits. Overall, it is estimated that Q-Flex carriers have about 40% lower energy requirements and carbon emissions than conventional LNG carriers.

The capacity of a Q-Flex vessel is between 165,000 m^{3} and 216,000 m^{3}. Until the entry into service of the Q-Max-type carrier, it was the world's largest LNG carrier type with a capacity of 1.5 times that of conventional LNG carriers.

== Contractors ==
The first Q-Flex LNG carrier was delivered by Hyundai Heavy Industries in late 2007. The installed re-liquefaction system is developed and delivered by Hamworthy and approved and certified by DNV. Q-Flex LNG carriers are built also by Daewoo Shipbuilding & Marine Engineering Company and Samsung Heavy Industries.

== Ships ==
As of 2022 there are 31 named Q-Flex LNG carriers in service. All these vessels are owned by holding companies established by the Qatar Gas Transport Company (Nakilat) and different shipping companies such as Pronav, MOL, K-Line, Seapeak and NYK and they are chartered to Qatar's LNG producers QatarEnergy LNG.
