= Q-Max =

Ship for carrying liquefied natural gas

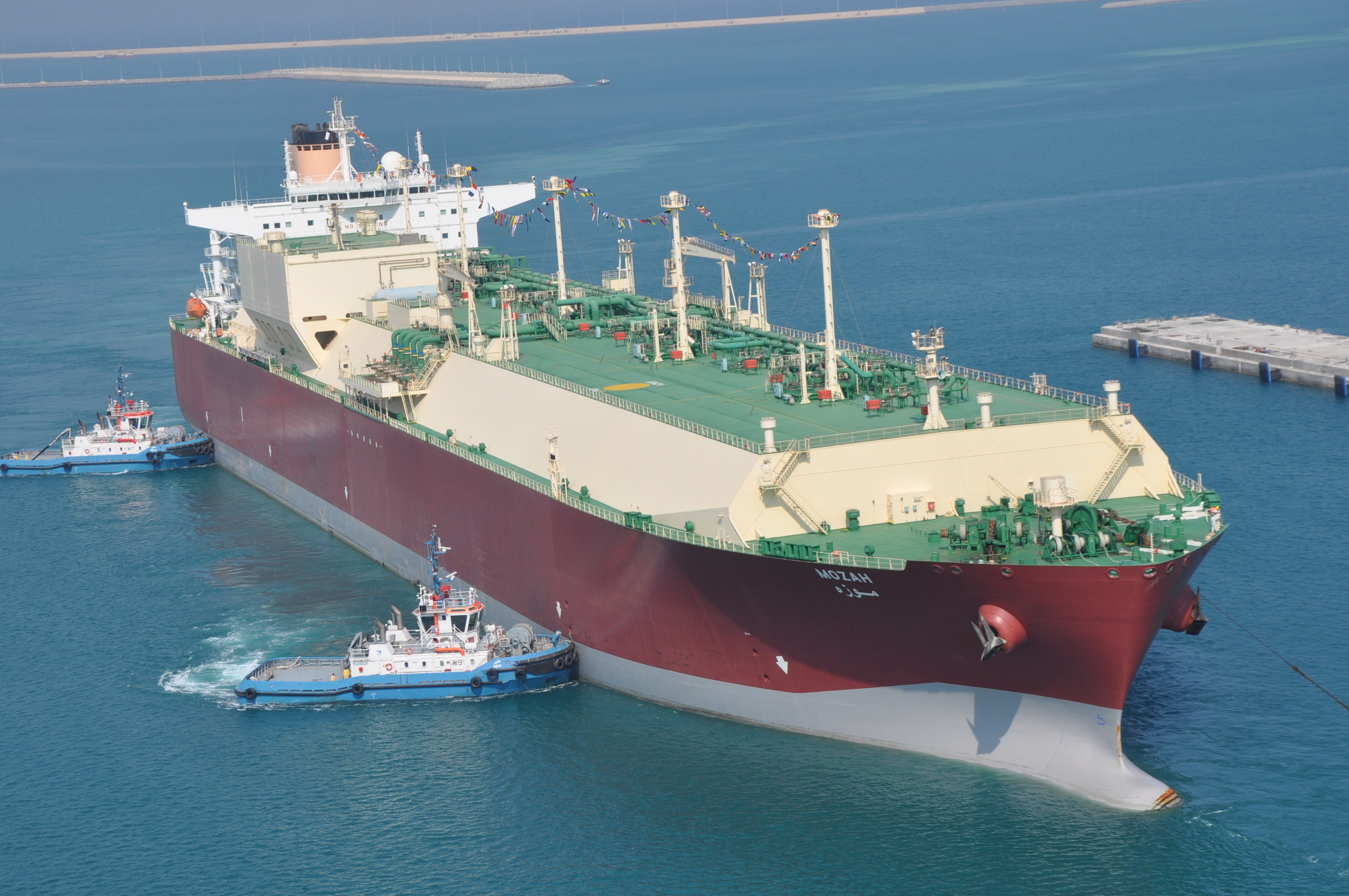

Class overview
- Name: Q-Max
- Builders: Samsung Heavy Industries; Hyundai Heavy Industries; Daewoo Shipbuilding & Marine Engineering
- Operators: Shell International Trading and Shipping Company
- Built: c. 2007–2010
- In service: Mozah, Al Mayeda, Mekaines, Al Mafyar, Umm Slal, Bu Samra, Al-Ghuwairiya, Lijmiliya, Al Samriya, Al Dafna, Shagra, Zarga, Aamira, Rasheeda
- Planned: 14
- Completed: 14
- Canceled: -
- Active: 14
- Lost: -
- Retired: -
- Preserved: -

General characteristics
- Type: LNG carrier
- Tonnage: 163,000 gross tons
- Length: 345 m (1,132 ft)
- Beam: 53.8 m (177 ft)
- Height: 34.7 m (114 ft)
- Draft: 12 m (39 ft)
- Installed power: 21,770 kW at 91 rpm, per engine
- Propulsion: 2 × MAN B&W 7S70ME-C two-stroke low speed diesel burning HFO, electronically controlled
- Speed: 19 kt
- Range: 33,600 nm at 16 kt
- Boats & landing craft carried: 2 x lifeboats, 2 x dinghy boats
- Capacity: 266,000 m^{3} (9,400,000 cu ft)
- Crew: 30

Q-Max is a type of ship, specifically a membrane type LNG carrier. In the name Q-Max, "Q" stands for Qatar and "Max" for the maximum size of ship able to dock at the Liquefied natural gas (LNG) terminals in Qatar. Ships of this type are the largest LNG carriers in the world.

== Technical description ==
Comparison of bounding box of Q-max with some other ship sizes in isometric view.

A ship of Q-Max size is 345 metres (1,132 ft) long and measures 53.8 metres (177 ft) wide and 34.7 metres (114 ft) high, with a draft of approximately 12 metres (39 ft).

It has an LNG capacity of 266,000 cubic metres (9,400,000 cu ft), equal to 161,994,000 cubic metres (5.7208×10^{9} cu ft) of natural gas. It is propelled by two slow speed diesel engines burning HFO, which are claimed to be more efficient and environmentally friendly than traditional steam turbines. In case of engine failure, the failed engine can be de-coupled allowing the ship to maintain a speed of 14 knots.

LNG is stored at around -162°C. Q-Max vessels are equipped with an on-board re-liquefaction system to handle the boil-off gas, liquefy it and return the LNG to the cargo tanks. The on-board re-liquefaction system allows a reduction of LNG losses, which produces economic and environmental benefits.

Overall, it is estimated that Q-Max carriers have about 40% lower energy requirements and carbon emissions than conventional LNG carriers. The quoted estimates do however ignore the additional fuel used to re-liquify boil off gas rather than burn the gas for fuel. The ships run on Heavy fuel oil (HFO), but the Rasheeda was retrofitted with gas-burning ability in 2015.

== Contractors ==
The Q-Max LNG carriers were ordered in 2005. They were built by Samsung Heavy Industries and Daewoo Shipbuilding & Marine Engineering. The installed Boil Off Gas re-liquefaction system (Ecorel) is developed and delivered by Cryostar, and approved and certified by Lloyds Register.

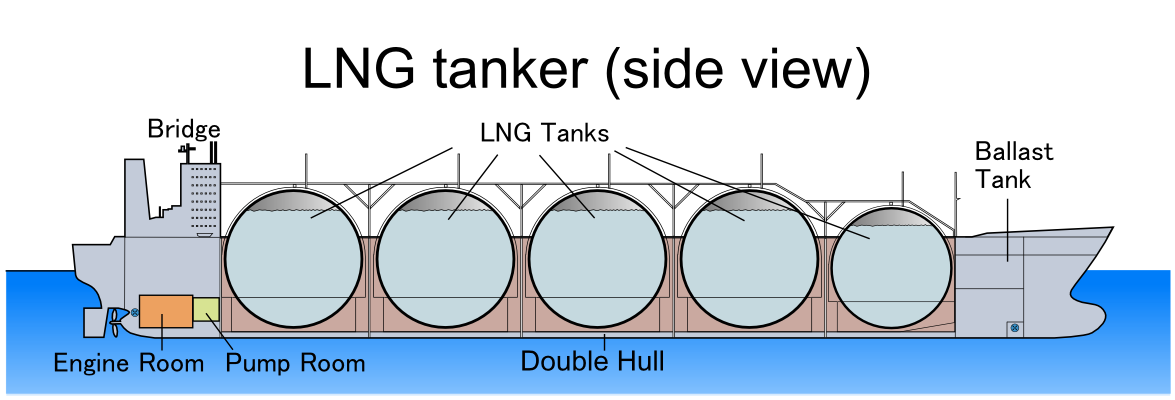
A Moss-type (not Q-Max type) LNG tanker, side view

== Ships ==
The first Q-Max LNG carrier was floated out of dry-dock in November 2007. The naming ceremony was held on 11 July 2008 at Samsung Heavy Industries' shipyard on Geoje Island, South Korea. Known before its naming ceremony as Hull 1675, the ship was named Mozah by Sheikha Mozah Nasser al-Misnad. Mozah was delivered on 29 September 2008. It is classed by Lloyd's Register. The first trip by a Q-Max tanker was completed by Mozah itself on 11 January 2009, when the tanker delivered 266,000 cubic metres of LNG to the Port of Bilbao BBG Terminal. Days before, the vessel had transited the Suez Canal for the first time.

Four Q-Max LNG carriers are operated by the STASCo (Shell International Trading and Shipping Company Ltd, London part of Shell International and 10 by NSQL (Nakilat Shipping Qatar Limited). They are owned by Qatar Gas Transport Company (Nakilat) and they are chartered to Qatar's LNG producers QatarEnergy LNG. In total, contracts were signed for the construction of 14 Q-Max vessels.

Fourteen sister vessels are in service named: Mozah, Al Mayeda, Mekaines, Al Mafyar, Umm Slal, Bu Samra, Al Ghuwairiya, Lijmiliya, Al Samriya, Al Dafna, Shagra, Zarga, Aamira, and Rasheeda. All 14 Q-Max ships were delivered in 2008 through 2010.

== See also ==
- Q-Flex
- Ras Laffan Industrial City
