= Nigerian LNG train 7 =

Liquefied natural gas expansion project in Rivers State, Nigeria

Nigerian LNG Train 7
- NLNG Train 7
- Type of project: Liquefied natural gas (LNG) expansion project
- Location: Bonny Island, Rivers State
- Owner: Nigeria LNG Limited (NLNG)
- Country: Nigeria
- Website: www.nigerialng.com
- Status: Unknown

Nigeria LNG Train 7 is an expansion under construction at the Nigeria LNG Terminal in Bonny Island, Nigeria.

== Current situation ==
Owner and operator of the terminal is Nigeria LNG (NLNG), a joint venture between Nigerian National Petroleum Corporation (NNPC), Shell Gas, Total, and Eni.

At this moment (2022), the terminal has six operational LNG processing facilities, four 84,200m³ LNG storage tanks, four 65,000m³ cooling tanks, and three 36,000m³ condensate storage tanks. Furthermore, the terminal consists of a common LNG processing fractionation plant, a common condensate stabilization plant, two LNG export jetties, 23 dedicated LNG ships, a materials off-loading jetty, and ten gas turbine generators with a combined capacity of more than 320MW. In the current situation, the terminal produces 22Mtpa of LNG and 5Mtpa of liquefied petroleum gas (LPG) and condensate per annum (Mtpa).

The Russian invasion of Ukraine has increased international demand for natural gas in 2022. This is increasingly promoting Nigeria's role as an alternative supplier.

== Scope ==
The seventh LNG processing unit adds a production capacity of 4.2Mtpa and supporting infrastructure.

Train 7 project will also reduce bottlenecks of the existing six trains by adding a Common Liquefaction Unit. This should increase the processing capacity by 3.8Mtpa.

== Capacity increase, new jobs ==
Upon completion, the Nigeria LNG Train 7 project will increase the NLNG Terminal production capacity by 35% from the current 22mtpa to 30mtpa. The estimated costs are approximately US$6.5bn.

According to managing director Tony Attah, the Train 7 project will create 52,000 jobs. 12,000 of these jobs would be created through direct employment; 40,000 people would be indirectly employed by the project. The total investment would be about over $10 billion.

== Current state ==
The Executive Secretary of the Nigerian Content Development and Monitoring Board (NCDMB), Simbi Wabote, announced in August 2022, that the Train 7 project is over 80 percent complete.https://punchng.com/train-7-gas-project-now-80-complete-nlng/#google_vignette

== Outlook ==
Earlier, in May 2022, Mele Kyari, Group Managing Director of the Nigerian National Petroleum Company (NNPC) Limited, estimated, that the Train 7 project will be completed within four years.
