= Tony Attah =

Nigerian engineer and business executive

- Born: Anthony Attah; 30 April 1965 (age 61); Ngurore, Northern Region, Nigeria (now Adamawa State, Nigeria)
- Education: University of Ibadan, University of Benin
- Occupations: MD and CEO, Renaissance Africa Energy Company
- Years active: 1990 - present
- Known for: CEO, Renaissance Africa Energy Company; Former CEO of Nigeria LNG Limited
- Spouse: Omataikpo Attah
- Children: 2

Anthony Attah (born 30 April 1965) is a Nigerian engineer and business executive. He is the current managing director and chief executive officer of Renaissance Africa Energy Company Limited. He previously led Nigeria LNG Limited as managing director and chief executive officer from July 2016 until August 2021, where he oversaw the Final Investment Decision for the Train 7 expansion project, and has held senior roles within Shell's global gas and upstream businesses.

== Early life ==
Attah was born on 30 April 1965 in Ngurore, Nigeria. He is of Ososo descent in the Akoko Edo local government area of Edo State.

Attah earned a Bachelor of Engineering in Mechanical Engineering from the University of Ibadan in 1987 and a Master of Business Administration (MBA) from the University of Benin in 1997.

== Career ==
=== Early career ===
He began his professional career at Sokoto Cement Company as a Maintenance and Operations Shift Supervisor, then joined Royal Dutch Shell, rising through technical, commercial, and leadership roles both in Nigeria and abroad. His positions included Senior Projects Advisor in Shell's Group Integrated Gas business in The Hague, Managing Director of Shell Nigeria Exploration and Production Company(SNEPCo),Vice President HSE and Corporate Affairs, and Vice President Human Resources (HR) in Shell E&P Africa.,.

=== Nigeria LNG Limited ===
In July 2016, Attah was appointed Managing Director and Chief Executive Officer of Nigeria LNG Limited, a joint venture owned by the Nigerian National Petroleum Corporation (49%), Shell Gas BV (25.6%), Total LNG Nigeria Ltd (15%) and Eni International (10.4%). He led the company until 30 August 2021. During his tenure, he steered NLNG to the Final Investment Decision (FID) on the multibillion-dollar Train 7 expansion project, expected to boost the company's liquefied natural gas capacity by approximately 35%. He also promoted gas monetisation initiatives and sustainability practices, including efforts to reduce gas flaring in Nigeria.

=== Renaissance Africa Energy Company ===
In March 2024, Attah became managing director and chief executive officer of Renaissance Africa Energy Company Limited.

== Personal life ==
Attah is married to Omataikpo Attah and has two children
