= Sesan Peter Ayodeji =

Nigerian academic

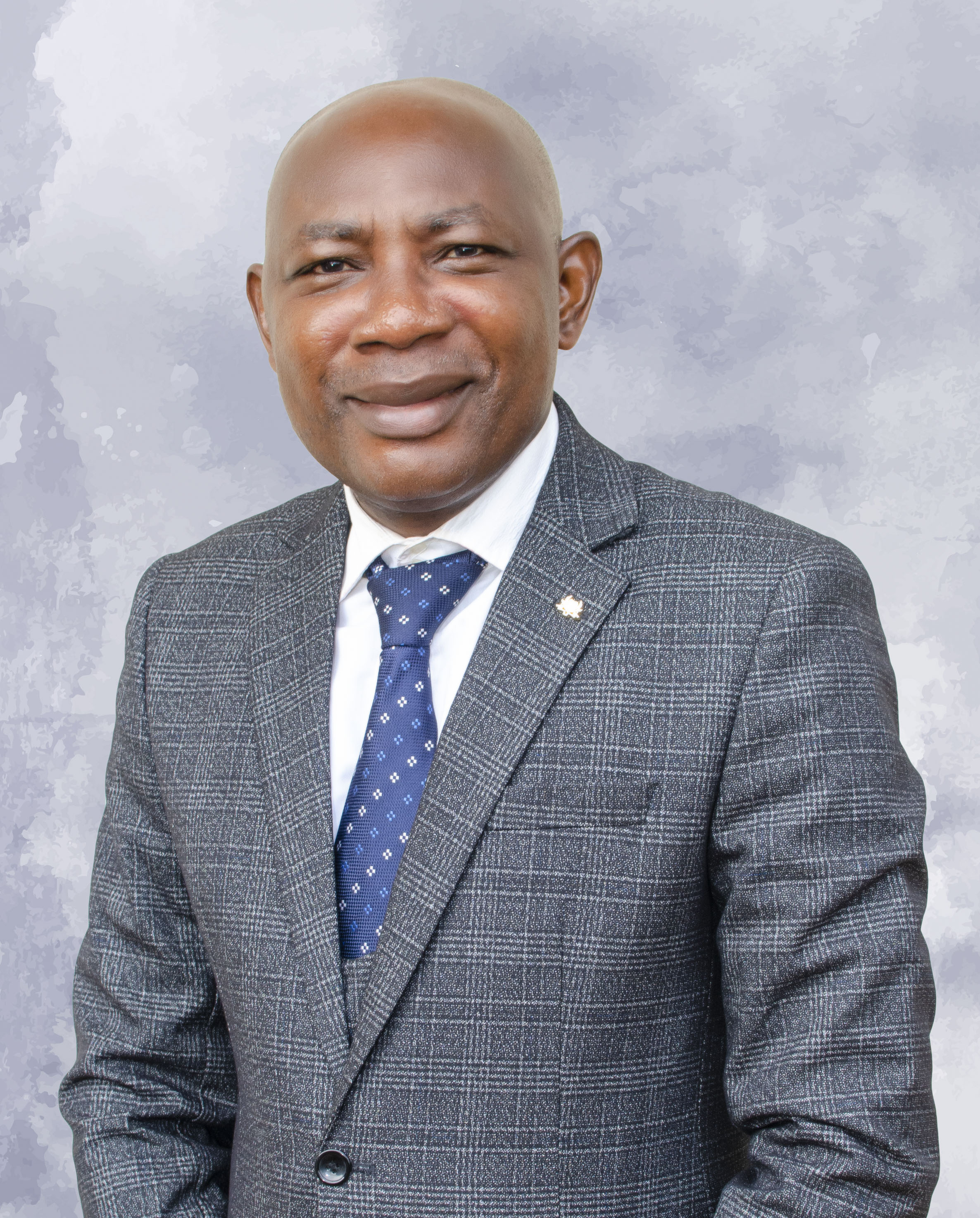
- Sesan Peter Ayodeji
- Born: April 4, 1972
- Education: Federal University of Technology Akure (B.Eng, M.Eng, Ph.D.)
- Occupations: Professor, Researcher
- Known for: Research in Machine and Process Design, Applied Ergonomics
- Awards: The Nigeria Prize for Science (2022)
- Scientific career
- Fields: Industrial and Production Engineering

Sesan Peter Ayodeji (born 4 April 1972) is a Nigerian academic and professor of mechanical engineering at the Federal University of Technology Akure. He is known for contributions to machine and process design, applied ergonomics, and industrial systems optimization. He won the Nigeria Prize for Science in 2022 for co-developing a process plant for plantain flour production. Ayodeji completed his postdoctoral programme at the Tshwane University of Technology, Pretoria, South Africa from 2012 to 2013.

His research interests include engineering systems optimization, machine efficiency, human-centered design in industrial processes. He has written numerous peer-reviewed publications and has participated in research initiatives related to academic development, industry practices, and policy discussions in Nigeria. A registered engineer with the Council for the Regulation of Engineering in Nigeria (COREN) and a Fellow of the Nigerian Society of Engineers (FNSE), he is also a member of several professional organizations, including the International Association of Engineers (IAENG), Nigerian Institution of Mechanical Engineers (NiMechE), Material Society of Nigeria (MMSN), and the Nigerian Institution of Engineering Management (NIIEM).

== Early life and education ==
Ayodeji was born on 4 March 1972 in Ekiti State, Nigeria. He attended A.U.D. Primary School, Aramoko-Ekiti from 1979 to 1984 and proceeded to Alamoye Comprehensive High School, Aramoko-Ekiti, where he graduated in 1990. He enrolled into Federal University of Technology, Akure, where he had his Bachelor of Engineering degree in Mechanical Engineering in 1999; Master of Engineering degree in Mechanical Engineering in 2003, and a Doctor of Philosophy (Ph.D.) in Production engineering in 2009. In 2012, Ayodeji completed a postdoctoral research fellowship at the Industrial Engineering Department of Tshwane University of Technology, Pretoria, South Africa.

== Academic career ==
Ayodeji was a graduate assistant at the Federal University of Technology Akure in 2000. He also served as Assistant Lecturer, Lecturer II, Lecturer I, and Senior Lecturer between 2000 and 2016. From 2000 to 2012, he was affiliated with Modibbo Adama University of Technology, Yola, before briefly returning in 2017 as a visiting scholar. Between 2012 and 2013, he was engaged in a postdoctoral research programme at Tshwane University of Technology, Pretoria, South Africa, and later served as a Research and Innovation Associate Professor in the Department of Industrial Engineering from 2014 to 2019. Since 2021, he has held the position of Professor in the Department of Industrial and Production Engineering at the Federal University of Technology Akure. In 2021, he was appointed as dean on sabbatical at Achievers University, Owo, where he oversees academic and administrative activities of the College of Engineering and Technology.

== Research and publications ==
Ayodeji has published over 90 scientific papers in peer-reviewed journals, including book chapters in refereed books. He has developed several machines and processes, one of which led to his recognition in the 2022 Nigeria Prize for Science for the development of a process plant for plantain flour production.

He has authored and co-authored several peer-reviewed articles in international journals, contributing to the fields of mechanical and production engineering.

=== Selected publications ===
- Performance evaluation of a locally developed cassava chipping machine. South African Journal of Industrial Engineering 19 (1), 169-178
- Whole-body vibration exposure on earthmoving equipment operators in construction industries. Cogent Engineering 5(1), 1507266
- Development and Performance Evaluation of a parboiling machine for poundo-yam flour processing plant. Journal of Emerging Trends in Engineering and Applied Sciences 2 (5), 853-857
- Effects of particulate reinforcements on the hardness, impact and tensile strengths of AA 6061-T6 friction stir weldments. Proceedings of the Institution of Mechanical Engineers, Part L: Journal of Materials: Design and Applications 235 (6), 1500-1506
- Conceptual design of a process plant for the production of plantain flour. Cogent Engineering 3 (1), 1191743.

== Honours ==
Ayodeji won the joint winner of the Nigeria Prize for Science in 2022; he invented the "Development of Process Plant for Plantain Flour" with Emmanuel Olatunji Olatomilola.
