= Nigeria Prize for Science =

- Awarded for: Excellence in Science Breakthroughs
- Sponsored by: Nigeria Liquefied Natural Gas Limited
- Date: Annual
- Country: Nigeria
- Presented by: Nigerian Academy of Science with advisory board constituted from: Nigerian Academy of Letters; Association of Nigerian Authors
- Reward: US$100,000
- First award: 2004; 22 years ago
- Latest recipients: 5 joint winners
- Website: Official website

The Nigeria Prize for Science is a science award given annually since 2004 for excellence in science breakthroughs. It is the country's highest scientific award. The award is sponsored by Nigeria LNG Limited. The prize describes itself as "bringing Nigerian scientists to public attention and celebrating excellence in scientific breakthroughs".

== History ==
The Prize was initially $20,000 each in Literature and Science. This was increased to $30,000 in 2006, and again to $50,000 in 2008. In 2011 the prize was increased to $100,000.

== Past recipients ==
Source: Nigeria NLG Ltd

Year	Recipient(s)	Work	Note
2024	Eni Oko	For their work“Process Intensification Technology for Greenhouse Emission Control in Power Generation and Industry for Sustainable Fuel Production (PIC-FUEL).”	
2024	Olajide Otitoju	For their work“Process Intensification Technology for Greenhouse Emission Control in Power Generation and Industry for Sustainable Fuel Production (PIC-FUEL).”	
2024	Meihong Wang	For their work“Process Intensification Technology for Greenhouse Emission Control in Power Generation and Industry for Sustainable Fuel Production (PIC-FUEL).”	
2023	Hippolite Amadi	For their work "Low-cost Respiratory Technologies for Keeping the Nigerian Neonates Alive"	
2022 (Shared prize)	Muhydideen Oyekunle	For their work "Gains in Grain Yield of Released Maize (Zea Mays L.) Cultivars under Drought and Well-Watered Conditions"	
2022 (Shared prize)	Shehu Ado	For their work "Gains in Grain Yield of Released Maize (Zea Mays L.) Cultivars under Drought and Well-Watered Conditions"	
2022 (Shared prize)	Sesan Peter Ayodeji	For their work "Development of Process Plant for Plantain Flour"	
2022 (Shared prize)	Emmanuel Olatunji Olatomilola	For their work "Development of Process Plant for Plantain Flour"	
2020/2021	No winner		
2019	Meihong Wang	for their works on Carbon Capture, Carbon Utilization, and Biomass Gasification and Energy Storage for Power Generation	
2019	Mathew Aneke	for their works on Carbon Capture, Carbon Utilization, and Biomass Gasification and Energy Storage for Power Generation	
2018	Peter Ngene	for his work titled: "Nanostructured metal hydrides for the storage of electric power from renewable Energy Sources and explosion prevention in high voltage power transformers"	
2017 (Shared prize)	Ikeoluwapo Ajayi	For their work titled: "Improving Home and Community Management of Malaria: Providing the Evidence Base''	There are three research works as joint winners authored by five people. Three in group, two authors have separate works each
2017 (Shared prize)	Ayodele Jegede	For their work titled: "Improving Home and Community Management of Malaria: Providing the Evidence Base''	There are three research works as joint winners authored by five people. Three in group, two authors have separate works each
2017 (Shared prize)	Bidemi Yusuf	For their work titled: "Improving Home and Community Management of Malaria: Providing the Evidence Base''	There are three research works as joint winners authored by five people. Three in group, two authors have separate works each
2017 (Shared prize)	Olugbenga Mokuola	For his work titled:"Multifaceted Efforts at Malaria Control in Research: Management of Malaria of Various Grade"	There are three research works as joint winners authored by five people. Three in group, two authors have separate works each
2017 (Shared prize)	Chukwuma Agubata	For his work titled: "Novel Lipid Microparticles for Effective Delivery of Artemether Antimalarial Drug using a Locally-Sourced Irvingia Fat from Nuts of Irvingia Gabonensis var Excelsa (Ogbono)"	There are three research works as joint winners authored by five people. Three in group, two authors have separate works each
2011-2016	no winner		
2010	Akahehomen O. Akii Ibhadode	For his work "on the development of a new method in Dye Design"	
2009	Andrew Jonathan Nok	For "Discovery of the gene responsible for the creation of Sialidase (SD), an enzyme which causes sleeping sickness (Trypanosomiasis)"	
2008	Ebenezer Meshida	For his work titled: "Solution to Road Pavement Destabilisaion by the Invention of 'Lateralite'"	
2007	no winner		
2006	Michael Adikwu	For his work titled: "Wound Healing Devices (Formulations) Containing Snail Mucins"	
2005	no winner		
2004 (Shared prize)	Akpoveta Susu	For their work titled: "Real-Time Computer Assisted Leak Detection/Location Reporting and Inventory Loss Monitoring System"	When they work for the winning research, Kingsley is doctoral student of Akpoveta Susu
2004 (Shared prize)	Kingsley Abhulimen	For their work titled: "Real-Time Computer Assisted Leak Detection/Location Reporting and Inventory Loss Monitoring System"	When they work for the winning research, Kingsley is doctoral student of Akpoveta Susu

== See also ==
- Nigeria Prize for Literature –sister award for Literature
- List of general science and technology awards
