= Meihong Wang =

Professor in UK

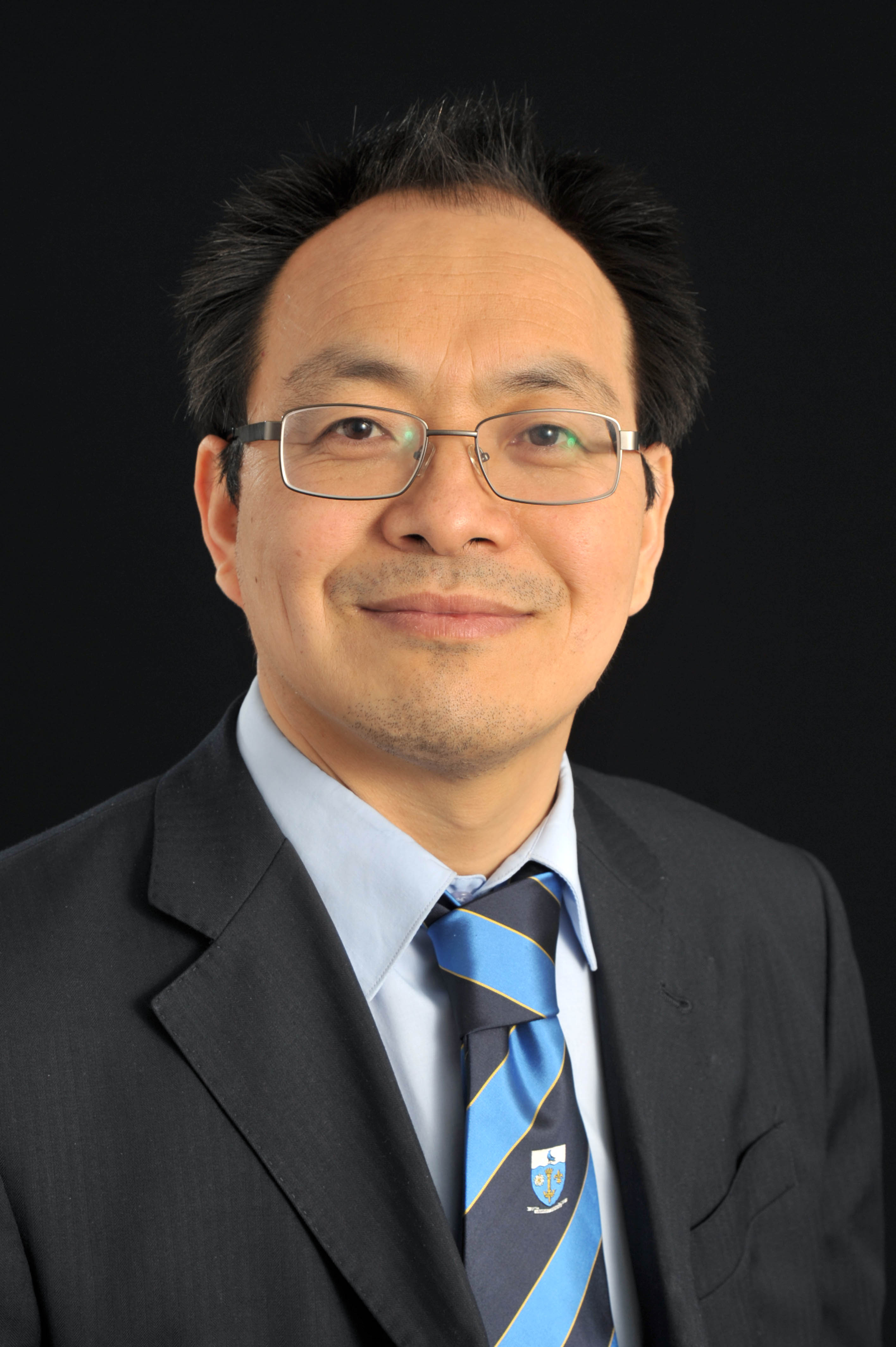
Portrait of Meihong Wang

Meihong Wang is an academic, born in Dongtai City, Jiangsu Province in China. He is a professor on Process Systems Engineering (PSE) at the University of Sheffield. His researches are on power plants, carbon capture utilisation and storage, energy storage and bio-energy through modelling, optimization and control.

== Education and Career ==
Meihong Wang joined the Nanjing Chemical Engineering Power College in China (now part of Nanjing Normal University) in 1985. He worked in the chemical industry from 1988 to 1992, at Yancheng City, China. He did his MSc on Process Control and Instrumentation at East China University of Science and Technology, and joined Beijing University of Chemical Technology as Lecturer in 1995. In 1999, Wang became a Research Assistant and Part-time PhD student at the Centre for Process Systems Engineering between Imperial College London and University College London. From 2002 he continued his postdoctoral research at the CPSE at Imperial College London, and in 2003, at the University of Plymouth. In 2004, he joined Alstom Power Technology Centre as a Senior Engineer (working on modelling, analysis and monitoring of power plants with carbon capture). In 2006, he moved to Cranfield University as Lecturer on Process Systems Engineering, and MSc Course Director on Carbon Capture and Transport. In 2012, he moved to University of Hull as Reader, as well as promoted to professor in 2014. In 2016, he moved to University of Sheffield.

== Recognition ==
Meihong Wang was elected Fellow of European Academy of Sciences and Fellow of European Academy of Sciences and Arts in 2024 for his research contribution on CCUS through PSE techniques. He was elected Fellow of Institution of Engineering and Technology (FIET).

He was joint winner of Nigeria Prize for Science in 2024 for Process Intensification Technology for Greenhouse Emission Control in Power Generation and Industry for Sustainable Fuel Production (PIC-FUEL).”

He was Siemens PSE Model-based Innovation (MBI) Prize Winner 2022 for "an excellent work illustrating the use of gPROMS in the modelling, simulation and analysis of a complex process for efficient carbon capture".

He was joint winner of Nigeria Prize for Science in 2019 "for work on carbon capture, utilization, and biomass gasification and energy storage for power generation". This is the most important prize in the Africa.

A research project on applying process intensification techniques for carbon capture led by him was runner-up in IChemE Global Award 2019 (Energy Category).

The paper co-authored by Meihong Wang on large-scale energy storage (Aneke and Wang, 2016) was given Award for the Most Cited Review Paper in Applied Energy by Elsevier.

He was awarded Ludwig Mond Prize in 2014 by IMechE. The content of this paper was also widely used by a UK Department for Business, Energy and Industrial Strategy (BEIS) report in 2020 titled "Carbon capture, usage and storage (CCUS) deployment at dispersed sites".
