= Bonny Gas Transport =

Bonny Gas Transport BGT
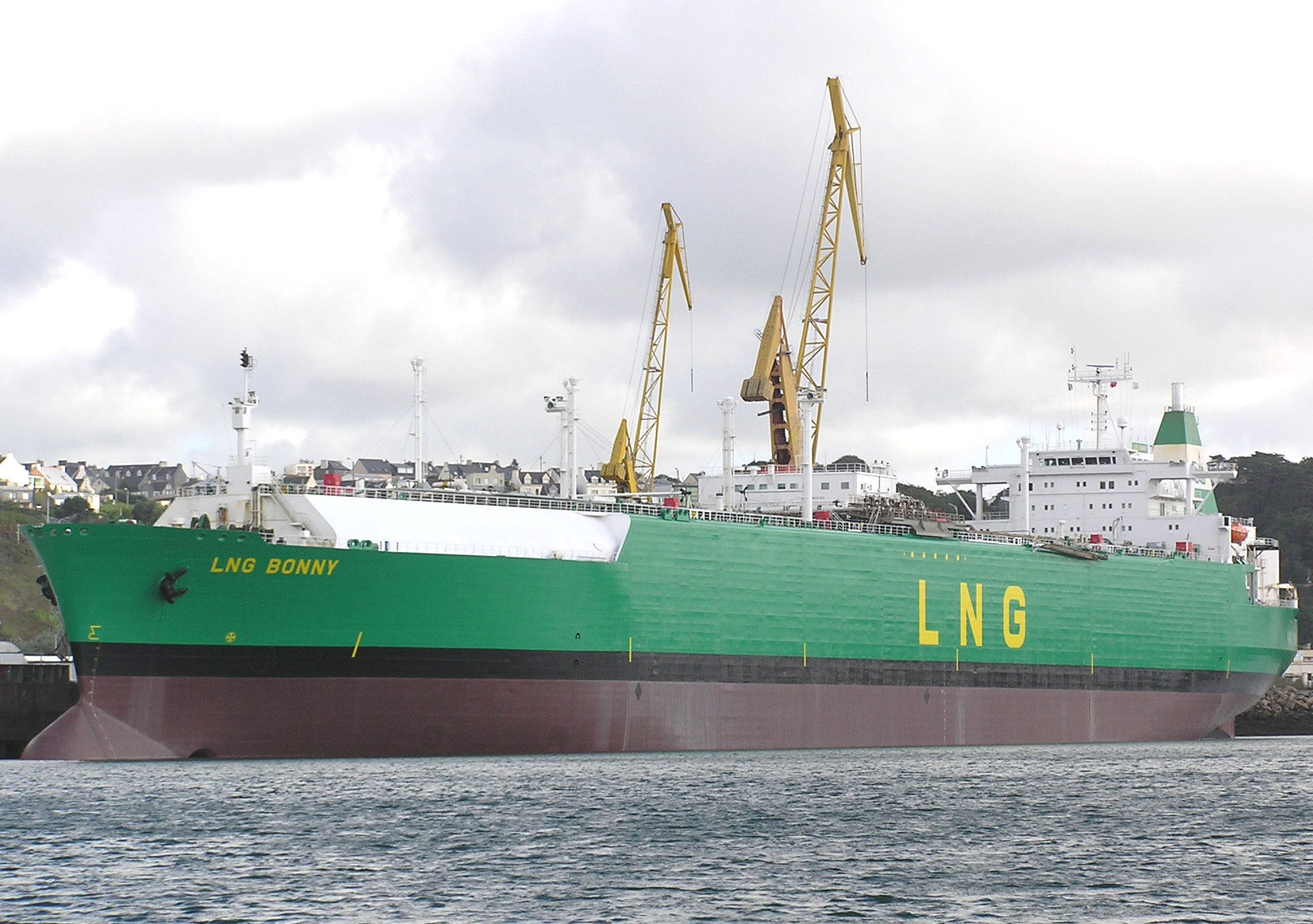
- Type: private, 100% subsidiary
- Industry: Oil and gas
- Founded: 1989
- Products: services: LNG shipping

Bonny Gas Transport is a subsidiary of Nigeria LNG or NLNG which itself is an incorporated joint-venture of Nigerian National Petroleum Corporation (NNPC), Shell Gas B.V., TotalEnergies Gaz & Electricite Holdings and Eni International N.A. N. V. S.àr.l. It owns and operates a number of LNG tankers.

== The company ==
Bonny Gas Transport Limited, initially named Enellengee Limited, was incorporated in 1989 following the incorporation of Nigeria LNG Limited (NLNG), to provide shipping capacity for NLNG. BGT owns and operates LNG tankers that transport NLNG’s products to its buyers. The Company is owned by NLNG and its shareholders.

== Activities ==
BGT was set up 1989 by Nigeria LNG Limited (NLNG) to transport all LNG gas produced by NLNG to customers.

== Fleet ==
The website Helderline provides an overview of 13 of these ships.

=== Fleetlist ===
As of April 2012, the company owned and operated the following LNG carriers:

Name	launched	shipyard build-number	IMO number	tonnage	flag	former name or notes
LNG Adamawa	2005	Hyundai buildnr:1470	9262211	118.000	Bermuda	
LNG Akwa Ibom	2004	Hyundai buildnr:1469	9262209	118.000	Bermuda	sister-ship of LNG Adamawa
LNG Bayelsa	2004	Hyundai buildnr:1429	9241267	118.000	Bermuda	sister-ship of LNG Adamawa
LNG Cross River	2005	Hyundai buildnr:1471	9262223	118.000	Bermuda	sister-ship of LNG Adamawa,
LNG River Niger	2006	Hyundai buildnr:1472	9262235	118.000	Bermuda	sister-ship of LNG Adamawa
LNG Rivers	2002	Hyundai buildnr:1295	9216298	114.354	Bermuda	
LNG Sokoto	2002	Hyundai buildnr:1296	9216303	114.354	Bermuda	sister-ship of LNG Rivers
LNG Lagos II	2016	Hyundai 2637	9692014	115.995	Bermuda	successor to LNG Lagos
LNG Port Harcourt II	2015	Samsung	9690157	116.568	Bermuda	successor to LNG Port Harcourt

=== Former fleet ===
Name	launched	shipyard build-number	IMO number	tonnage	flag	former name or notes	disposition
LNG Abuja	1980	General Dynamics buildnr:54	7619587	93.619	Bahamas	Lake Charles (1980–2000)	sold 2015 (Golar, $19 million); scrapped 2021
LNG Bonny	1981	Kockums Shipyard buildnr: 559	7708948	71.472	Bermuda	Rhenania (1981–1991)	sold 2015; scrapped 2021
LNG Edo	1980	General Dynamics buildnr:53	7619587	93.619	Bahamas	Louisiana (1980–2000) sistership of LNG Abuja; nearly capsized 2010	sold 2015; scrapped 2021
LNG Finima	1984	Kockums Shipyard buildr:564	7702401	71.472	Bermuda	LNG 564 (1984–1991) sistership of LNG Bonny	sold 2015; scrapped 2020
LNG Lagos	1977	Chantiers de l'Atlantique buildnr:26	7360124	68.122	Bermuda	MV Gastor (1977–1993)	sold 2015; scrapped 2018
LNG Port Harcourt	1976	Chantiers de l'Atlantique buildnr:B26	7360136	68.122	Bermuda	MV Nestor (1976–1993) sistership of LNG Lagos	sold 2015; scrapped 2018
