= Paediatrics and International Child Health =

- Discipline: Paediatrics
- Language: English

Publication details
- Publisher: Taylor & Francis

Standard abbreviations
- ISO 4: Ann. Trop. Paediatr.

Indexing
- ISSN: 0272-4936 (print); 1465-3281 (web)

Paediatrics and International Child Health (Annals of Tropical Paediatrics until 2012) is a medical journal devoted to paediatrics, including safety issues, with a focus on the developing world. Since it's founding in 1981, it has been published by Academic Press, Carfax and Maney Publishing for the Liverpool School of Tropical Medicine, and is now published by Taylor & Francis.

According to Ulrich's, it is included in BIOSIS, EMBASE, MEDLINE, and Scopus. It is distributed by Ingenta Connect, ProQuest, Cengage and EBSCO.
