= QatarEnergy LNG =

Liquefied natural gas company

Coordinates: 25°54′34″N 51°33′11″E

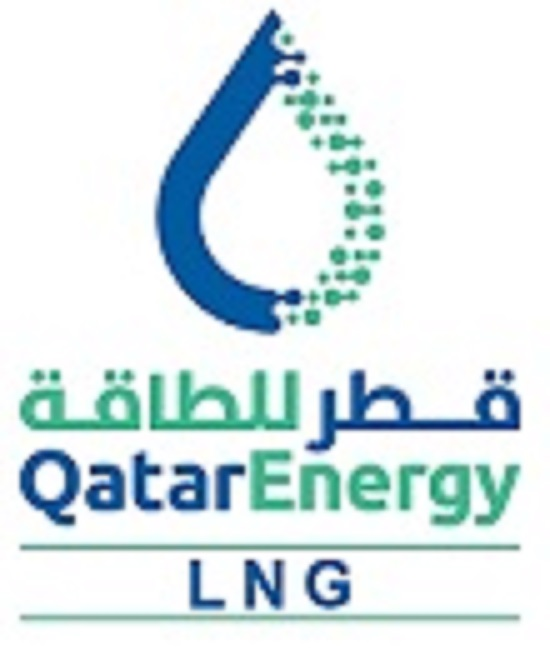
- Industry: Oil and gas
- Founded: 1984; 42 years ago
- Headquarters: Doha, Qatar
- Products: Liquefied natural gas
- Parent: QatarEnergy
- Website: qatarenergylng.qa/english

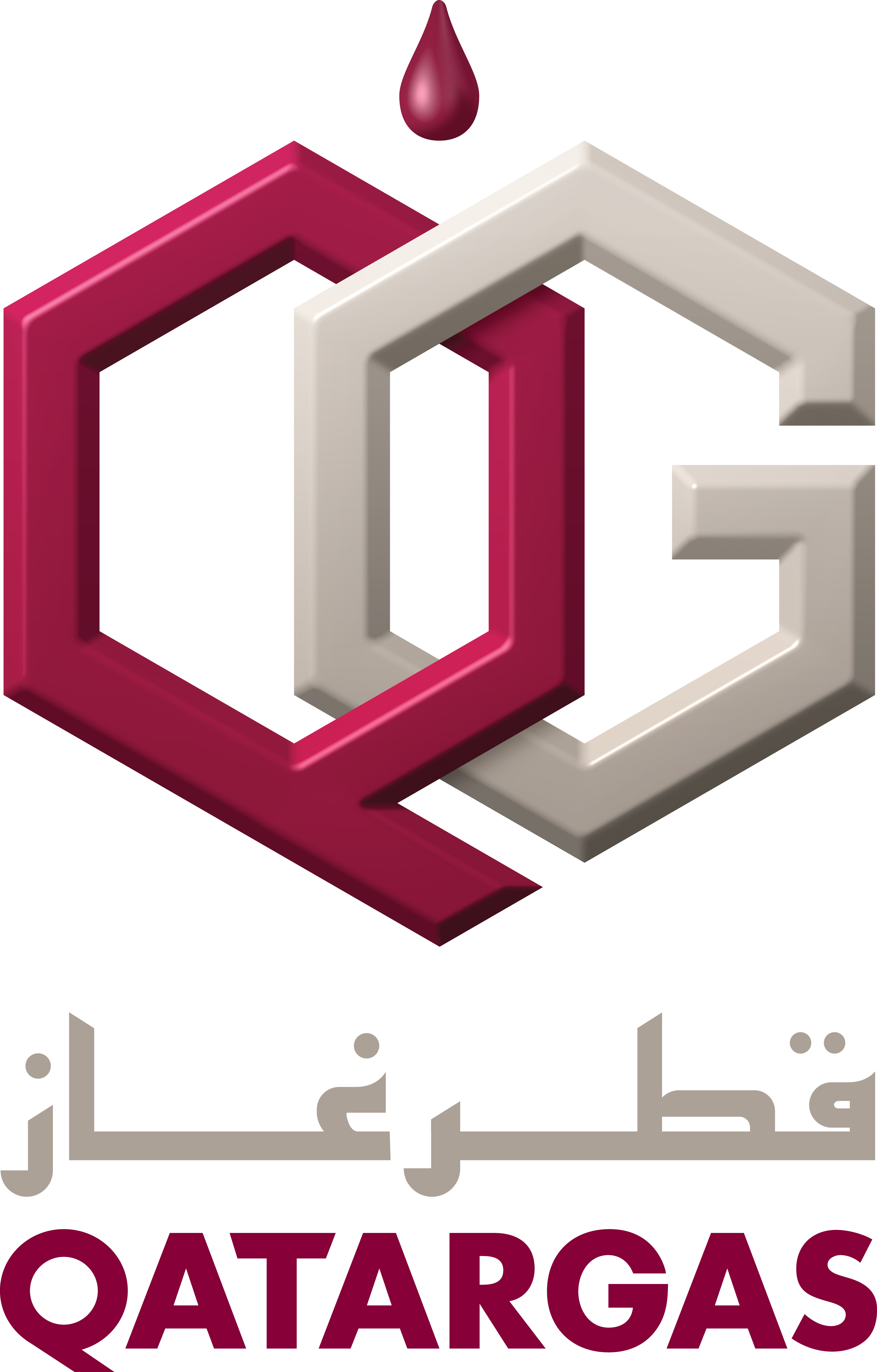

QatarEnergy LNG, formerly Qatargas, is a state-owned liquefied natural gas (LNG) company, operating as a subsidiary of QatarEnergy, the national petroleum and natural gas company of Qatar. It is the world's largest LNG company. It produces and supplies the globe with 77 million metric tonnes of LNG annually from across its seven ventures—QatarEnergy LNG N(1), QatarEnergy LNG N(2), QatarEnergy LNG N(3), QatarEnergy LNG N(4), RL1, RL2 and RL3. It is headquartered in Doha, Qatar, and maintains its upstream assets in Ras Laffan, Qatar. Natural gas is supplied to the company's LNG trains from Qatar's part of the North Field, by far the world's largest non-associated gas field. It reached a record LNG production of 77 million tonnes per year in December 2010, mainly sent by ship through the Strait of Hormuz. According to Brand Finance, QatarEnergy LNG is the world's fastest growing oil and gas brand in 2023.

== History ==
=== 1984–2000 ===
QatarEnergy LNG was established in 1984 as Qatargas (Qatargas Liquefied Gas Company Limited), a joint venture between QatarEnergy, ExxonMobil and other partners. In the following years the company began developing the North Field and erected the first three LNG trains (Train 1, 2 and 3) with a design capacity of 3.3 million tonnes per year each. The trains were built in 1996, 1997 and 1998 respectively.

The company executed the first two major sales and purchase agreements with eight Japanese customers in 1992 and 1994, the company Chubu Electric Power being the largest. The contract guaranteed the delivery of 4 million tonnes of LNG per year to Chubu Electric and six million tonnes per year over a 25-year period for the eight customers.

In 1993 Ras Laffan Liquefied Natural Gas Company was established as a subsidiary for the operation and maintenance of LNG and Helium production, and also operates as a subsidiary of QatarEnergy, based in Doha. The official foundation stone for Qatargas 1 was laid in 1994 and in 1995 another major contract with the Korea Gas Corporation (KOGAS) was signed, guaranteeing the supply of 2.4 million tonnes of LNG per year. Also, in 1995, the first offshore drilling operations were begun. In 1996 LNG production began. The first LNG carrier named Al Zubara was delivered to Qatargas in 1996. The first shipment of LNG was loaded and delivered to Japan in 1996 and Spain (Enagás) in 1997 from Ras Laffan Industrial City's port. In the same year, 1997, the then Emir Hamad bin Khalifa Al Thani inaugurated the Qatargas 1 LNG plant and facilities and the first sulfur plant launched operation (Sulfur Plant 1). 2000 marked 10 million tonnes of LNG delivered to Japan since shipment commencement in 1996.

=== 2001–2010 ===
Ras Laffan Liquefied Natural Gas Company II (RL II) and RasGas Company Ltd. were established in 2001 to operate the LNG trains and associated facilities, also located in Ras Laffan Industrial City. In the same year a 25-year contract with Edison Gas was signed. In 2002 a contract was signed with BP, for the delivery of 750,000 tonnes of LNG per year to Spain. The first shipment was scheduled for the third quarter of 2003 and the British Merchant, a BP-operated LNG vessel, was assigned to carry shipments over a three-year period. In the same year QatarEnergy signed an agreement with ExxonMobil for the construction of two additional LNG trains (Train 4 and 5), forming the "Qatargas 2" joint-venture. Exxon and other partners invested around $12.8 billion into the joint-venture. The foundation stone was laid in February 2005.

In 2003, a joint venture for the Ras Laffan helium project was formed. It produced the first helium in August 2005. Qatargas 3 was formed in the same year between QatarEnergy and ConocoPhillips. Another Head of Agreement between QatarEnergy and RL (II) to supply 15.6 Mta of LNG to the USA was signed in 2003. RasGas also began to build and operate the first phase of the Al Khaleej Gas project ("AK-1" or "AKG-1") for domestic gas supply on behalf of QatarEnergy and ExxonMobil Middle East Gas Marketing. In 2004 the first dedicated LNG vessel Fuwairit was delivered to RL (II), and in 2005 AK-1 was inaugurated and started, as well as Ras Laffan Liquefied Natural Gas Company Limited (III) (RLIII) established, which owns RasGas' trains 6 and 7, the company's first mega-trains. Another agreement between Shell and Qatargas was made to erect Qatargas 4 ("QG4").

Qatargas Operating Company Limited was formed in July 2005 for the purpose of constructions of Qatargas 2, Qatargas 3, Qatargas 4, Laffan Refinery and other assets on behalf of the shareholders. Qatargas also announced a moratorium on further development of the North Field in 2005, and ordered further studies and a review of the field, which were expected to end in 2010. The moratorium was initially expected to remain in place until 2013 or 2014 but was lifted in 2017. In 2006 the construction for QG3 and QG4 started and RasGas' Train 5 was erected. The train was inaugurated in 2007 as well as the first Q-Max LNG carrier "Al Dafna" floated out of its dry dock (delivered in 2009) and the first Q-Flex ship delivered to Qatargas.

In 2008 two major SPAs were signed with PetroChina, for 3 million tonnes per year over 25-years, and 2 million tonnes per year over 25 years with China National Offshore Oil Corporation (CNOOC) with the deal totaling around 2 million tonnes per year. It was to begin in October 2009. Another 10-year contract was signed between Qatargas and TT, ordering 1 million tons of LNG a year, starting in 2011. Ras Laffan Helium 1 reached its full production capacity in 2008 and the first LNG shipment to the west coast of North America was completed. As well the first Q-Flex vessel transited the Suez Canal.

Several other LNG deliveries to Italy (Adriatic LNG), Mexico (Altamira), China (CNOOC), Canada (Canaport LNG), the United Kingdom (South Hook) and the United States (Golden Pass) followed in 2009 and new SPAs were signed, like the long-term SPA with PGNiG of Poland. The SPA detailed 1 million tonnes per year over 20 years, with the first delivery being made in 2015. On April 6, 2009, the Qatargas 2 project was officially inaugurated with two mega trains of 7.8 million tonnes per year each. That same year phase 2 of the Al Khaleej Gas project was launched.

Following the international economic crisis and the downturn of gas and oil prices in 2008, Qatargas temporarily had to declare force majeure in January 2009 on production of three LNG trains. The company remained on track with its other projects and its general direction. In November 2010 and January 2011, respectively, qatargas 3 and 4 started production. In December 2010, Qatar celebrated achieving the national goal of 77 million tonnes per year for the first time, making it the world's largest LNG producer.

Because of the major advances in oil- and gas extracting techniques (shale - or tight gas from rock, oil sands) Qatargas had to make adjustments in its corporate strategy.

Whilst the company initially aimed at European customers and the United States, the increasing production from North America made it necessary focus on Asian markets, with Japan currently importing around 15% of its total gas consumption from Qatargas, and China, India and South Korea being other major customers.

In 2010 the Ras Laffan Helium 2 project was also announced, Train 6 began production (adding 7.8 million tonnes per year) and the Laffan Refinery was inaugurated by Al-Thani. Another deal with Respol (Canada) was signed in the same year. Qatargas agreed to deliver the LNG to Canaport using both Q-Flex and Q-Max vessels, each holding the equivalent of approximately 5.6 and 4.6 billion cubic feet of natural gas, respectively. Further major deliveries were made to Dubai and France and in 2010 further talks with the United Kingdom were initiated and a Heads on Agreement was signed. In June 2011 Qatargas then signed a three-year LNG deal with Centrica (UK), valued at around $3.24 billion at the time. The contract has since then been extended to a four-and-a-half-year contract in June 2014 and the latest contract extending the partnership until December 2023. Centrica had originally tried to seal a 20-year contract.

In 2010, Sheikh Khalid Bin Khalifa Al Thani was appointed CEO for the new Qatargas.

=== 2011–2020 ===
Qatargas also signed a long-term agreement in 2011 for over 1 million tonnes per year with Malaysia's Petronas, expiring in 2018, which has since been extended until December 2023. Qatargas' Train 7 began production in 2011 (7.8 million tonnes per year) and the Map Ta Phut LNG Terminal was commissioned by Qatargas that same year. In the following year, 2012, Qatargas 1 signed a long-term contract with Tokyo Electric Power Company for over 1 million tonnes per year of LNG. Qatargas 3 signed SPAs with PTT of Thailand, Japan's Kanasai and Chubu Electric Power in 2012.

In 2013 the Ras Laffan Helium 2 plant was inaugurated and produced its first helium that same year. The plant is the largest of its kind in the world and made Qatar the world's largest helium exporter. In 2014 the construction for Laffan Refinery 2 began and the refinery delivered the first Diesel Hydrotreater (DHT). The Procurement and Construction contract (EPC) for the DHT with Samsung Engineering had been signed in 2012. The DHT is able to process 54,000 barrels (8,600 m^{3}) per stream day of ultra-low-sulfur diesel fuel and was operated at 50% capacity until the Laffan Refinery 2 began production in 2016. The first ship-to-ship transfer (STS) of LNG, following an incident with one of Qatargas' leased vessels in the straights of Singapore, was carried out in 2014. Also, in 2014, Qatargas announced the successful start-up of the Jetty Boil-off Gas Recovery Project, which aimed to reduce flaring at the Ras Laffan LNG loading berths and was inaugurated in 2015.

2015 saw the 5000th LNG cargo loaded at Ras Laffan Port, 2300 of them having been shipped to Japanese customers, as well as the sale of the first LNG to the Kingdom of Jordan and the first delivery of LNG to Pakistan State Oil Company made in 2016. The 10,000 LNG vessel was loaded at Ras Laffan Port in 2016 and the Laffan Refinery 2 started operations with a refining capacity of 146,000 barrels of condensate per day. It was officially inaugurated by Al-Thani in 2017. In June 2017 Qatargas had to shut down operations of Helium 1 and Helium 2, due to the economic boycott, which was imposed on Qatar by other Arab States. Following other major companies like ARAMCO, the preparation and integration of the merger of state-owned companies Qatargas and RasGas, which had been announced in December 2016, was completed in 2017. Qatargas delivered 1.5 million tonnes per year and signed a new SPA with Turkey's Boas, to deliver 1.5 million tonnes per year of LNG for three years, beginning in October 2017. Another deal with Royal Dutch Shell to deliver up to 1.1 million tonnes per year of LNG for five years was also signed as well.

It aimed to "[…] create a truly unique global energy operator in terms of size, service and reliability" and to "[…] confirm and restrengthen QatarEnergy's superiority in the LNG business [by] reducing operating costs", stated the QatarEnergy's president and CEO Saad al-Kaabi. Al-Kaabi gave a press conference on 4 January 2018, stating that the new company would save around $550 million in operating costs per year.

=== 2021–present ===
In July 2021, the first delivery of LNG with a Q-Max carrier was made by Qatargas to the Krk LNG terminal in Croatia. This was the first time that Qatargas used the large vessel to deliver 260,000 cubic meters of LNG to a customer. It also delivered its first LNG on a Q-Flex carrier for the Al-Zour LNG receiving terminal in Kuwaits commission.

In August 2021, Qatargas announced the completion of the WHP12N platform jacket for the North Field Production Sustainability (NFPS) project. The drilling support structure is the first to ever be built in Qatar for Qatargas and it was celebrated on the Qcon yard where it was fabricated.

The Common Sulfur Plant (CSP) located in Ras Laffan achieved 10,000 tonnes of produced sulfur per day starting in September 2021.

In October 2021, Shell Qatar presented Qatargas with the Reliable Asset Award for 2020 and the beginning of 2021.

In November 2021, a project to build carbon dioxide sequestration facilities at Ras Laffan was announced and would be led by Qatargas along with Axens. The companies TEG technology was the reasoning for the selection of Axens.

Qatargas hosted the 17th Engineering Forum in December 2021, which was attended to by over 400 experts in the field of engineering in the gas and oil industries.

In January 2022, the Laffan Refinery was visited by a team from ExxonMobil Qatar and presented the facility with an award for outstanding safety performance, with has gone seven years without an injury.

Qatargas purchased 10 LNG steam-turbine carriers from various Japanese shipowners. The purchase came about in January 2022 after the charter contracts came to an end and the option to purchase the vessels was possible.

Qatargas made deals with Bangladesh in March 2022 to begin supplying LNG again during the summer while reducing the winter deliveries.

In June 2023, Qatargas completed the pre-qualification list for the major contract for all necessary engineering, procurement, construction and installation (EPCI) requirements for the compression facilities of its North Field Production Sustainability (NFPS) project. In July, Qatargas awarded McDermott the EPCI for the NFPS Offshore Fuel Gas Pipeline and the Subsea Cables Project (COMP1), which includes the installation of subsea pipelines, subsea composite cables, fiber optic cables and onshore pipelines.

In August 2023, Qatar agreed to supply Hungary with LNG starting in 2027. MVM started talks with Qatargas about quantity, pace and shipment.

In September 2023, Qatargas changed its name to QatarEnergy LNG.

QatarEnergy LNG signed a deal with PetroVietnam Gas for 70,000 tons of LNG to be delivered in April 2024 to its Thi Via LNG terminal.

In March 2026, the first LNG production unit ("train") started at Sabine Pass USA. Two more units are expected by 2027. The facility costs more than $10 billion, and QatarEnergy shares it with ExxonMobil.

== Ownership ==
QatarEnergy LNG is a state-owned liquefied natural gas (LNG) company, operating as a subsidiary of QatarEnergy, the national petroleum and natural gas company of Qatar.

== Operations ==
The shareholders of the QatarEnergy LNG N(1) are QatarEnergy, ExxonMobil, TotalEnergies, Mitsui and Marubeni. It owns three LNG trains. In 2008, it produced 10.09 million tonnes of liquefied natural gas. The projected production for the end of 2012 was 42 million tonnes per year.

QatarEnergy LNG N(2), a joint venture of QatarEnergy and ExxonMobil, owns LNG trains 4 and 5 with a capacity of 7.8 million tonnes per year each. It is supplying LNG for the South Hook LNG terminal at Milford Haven, Pembrokeshire, Wales, from where gas is fed to the South Wales Gas Pipeline. This covers 20% of the United Kingdom's needs of LNG.

QatarEnergy LNG N(3) is a joint venture between QatarEnergy, ConocoPhillips and Mitsui. QatarEnergy LNG N(4) is a joint venture between QatarEnergy and Shell. At first approached as separate projects, QatarEnergy LNG N(3) and N(4) are now being built by a joint asset development team that is staffed by QatarEnergy LNG, ConocoPhillips and Shell employees as well as project direct hires and short term contractors. Its trains have started up by end 2010 (N(3)) and early 2011 (N(4)).

QatarEnergy LNG's offshore operations are located approximately 80 kilometres (50 mi) northeast of Qatar's mainland on the North Field. The production facilities were commissioned in 1996. Processed gas is transferred to shore with the associated condensate via a single 32 inches (810 mm) subsea pipeline.

QatarEnergy LNG transports its LNG by using two classes of LNG tankers known as Q-Max and Q-Flex.

QatarEnergy plans to expand Qatar's LNG production capacity from 77 million tons per year to 142 million tons per year by 2030 through further development of the North Field. The revised target, announced in 2024, increased the previously planned capacity of 126 tons per year. In March 2024, the first three modules for the Field were completed and left Saipem’s fabrication yard.

== Environment ==
Since 2007 QatarEnergy LNG has relocated over 7,500 live corals from nearshore pipelines to protected offshore areas. Additionally they have deployed over 400 artificial reef modules around Qatar. The Coral Management Programme (CMP) was implemented to sustain and preserve marine biodiversity around Qatar. It is a joint initiative from QatarEnergy LNG, the Ministry of Municipality and Environment (MME) and Qatar University which began in 2021 and is part of the Environment Developmental Pillar of Qatar National Vision 2030. The CMP consists of an Artificial Reef Deployment and Coral Relocation and a Coral Nursery located at the Aquatic Fisheries Research Center (AFRC) in Ras Matbakh and it is an alleviation for the North Field Production Sustainability (NFPS) Project. Its implementation is in four phases, first finding a suitable location, second is building an artificial reef to deploy, third is the relocation of the live coral reef to the location from phase one, then finally phase four is to report and monitor the success and response from marine life in the location.

== See also ==
- Qatargas League
