= Nigeria LNG =

Liquefied natural gas plant of Nigeria

Coordinates: 4.4258°N 7.1531°E

Nigeria LNG Limited
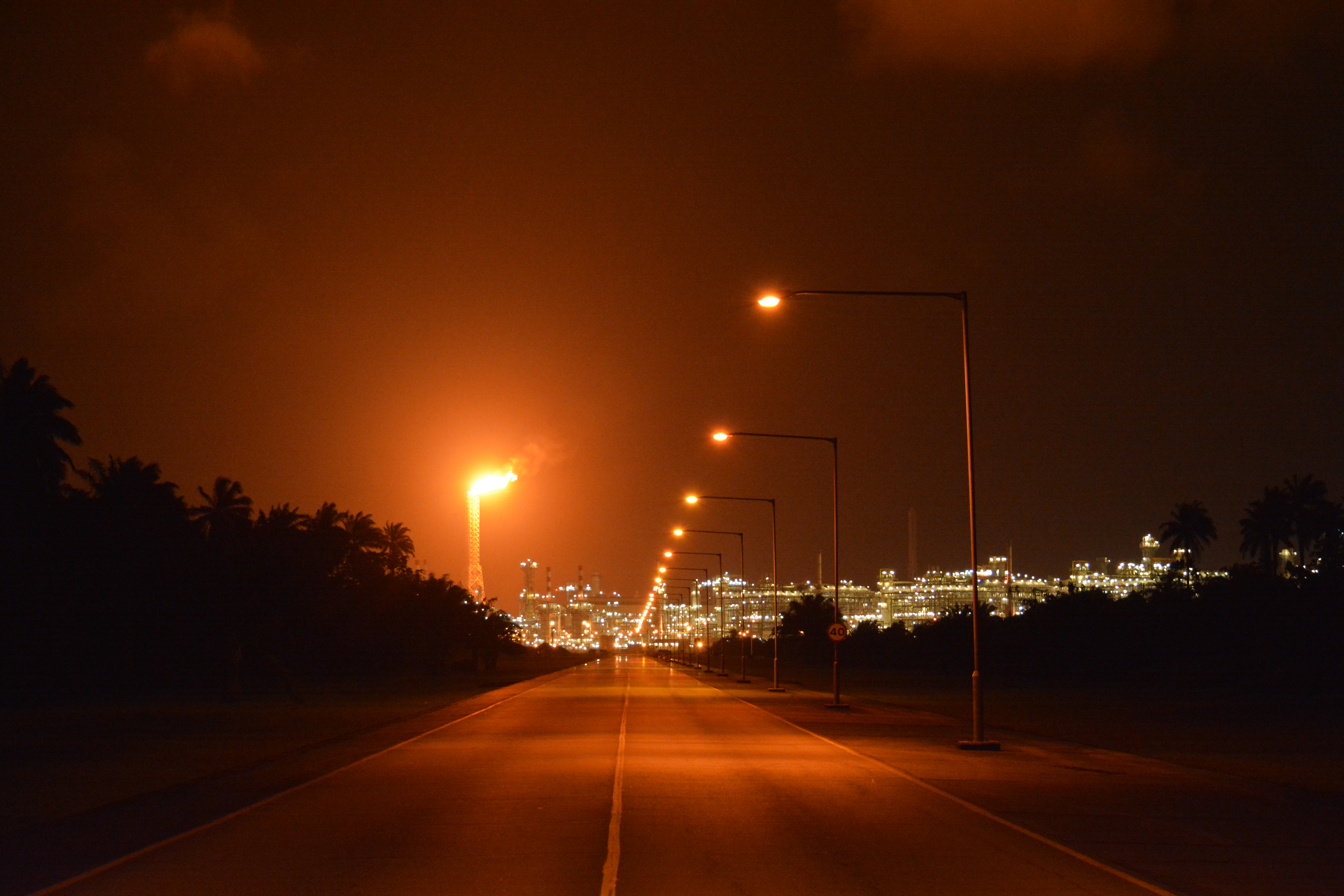
- Trade name: NLNG
- Type: Joint venture
- Industry: Liquefied natural gas
- Founded: May 17, 1989
- Headquarters: Bonny Island, Rivers State, Nigeria
- Products: Liquefied natural gas (LNG); Natural gas liquids (NGL)
- Production output: 22 million tonnes of LNG per year
- Owners: NNPC Limited – 49%; Shell Gas B.V. – 25.6%; Total LNG Nigeria Ltd – 15%; Eni International N.A. N.V. S.à.r.l. – 10.4%
- Website: www.nlng.com

Nigeria LNG Limited (NLNG) is a liquefied natural gas (LNG)-producing company and a liquefied natural gas plant on Bonny Island, Nigeria.

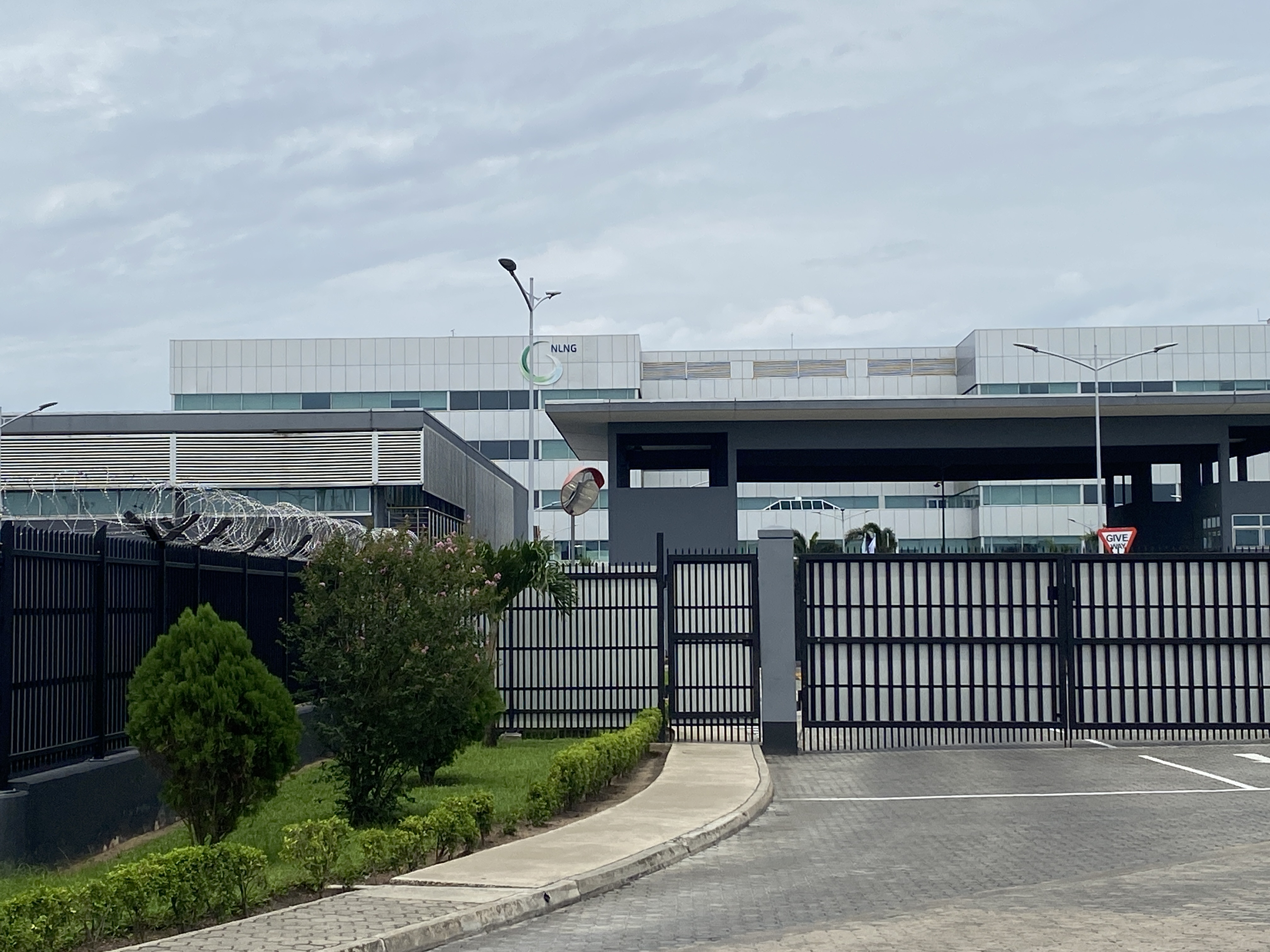

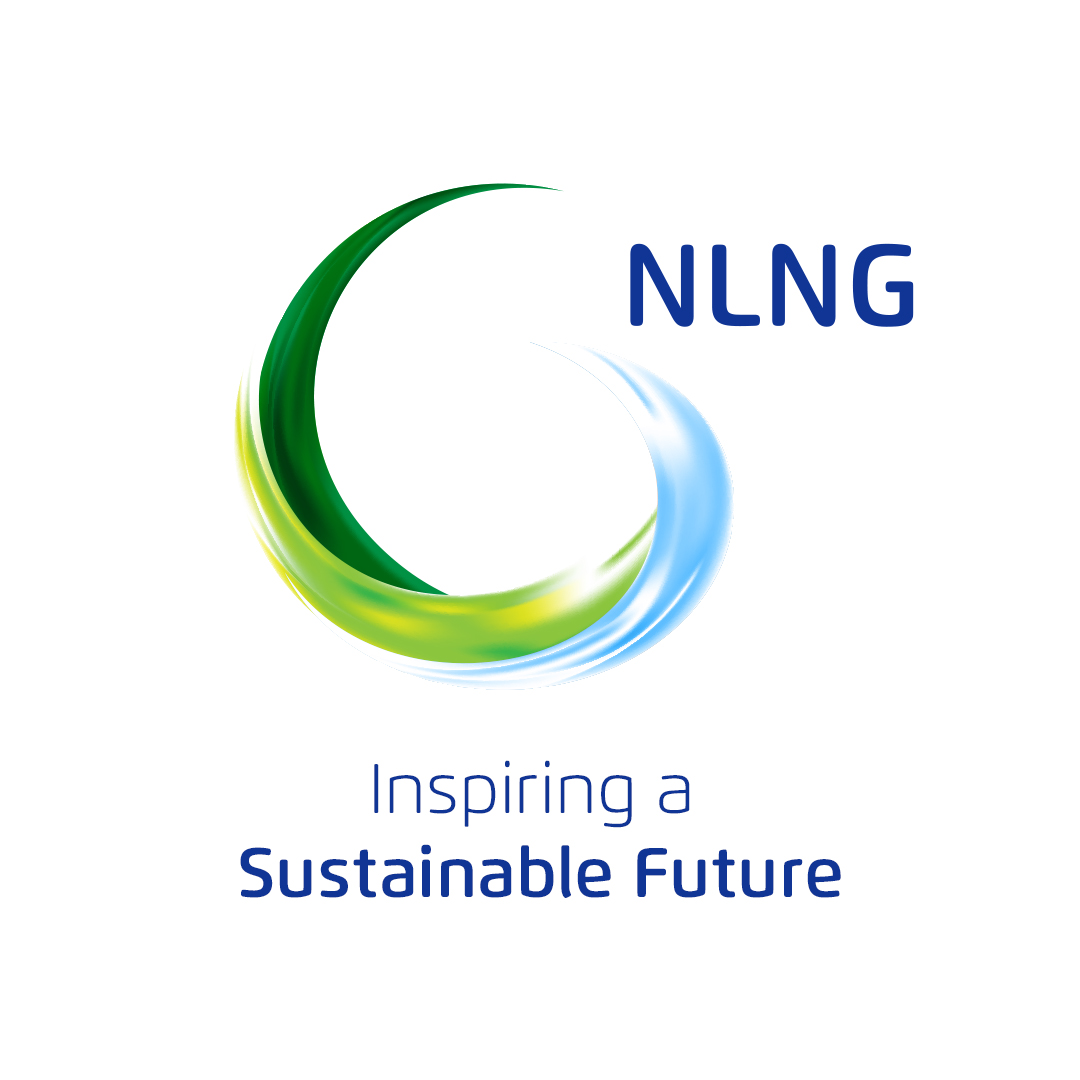
Incumbent managing director/CEO: Dr. Philip Mshelbila-July 9, 2021 - April, 2026 Icoming managing director and CEO: Adeleye Falade-April, 2026

== History ==
Nigeria LNG Limited was incorporated as a limited liability company on 17 May 1989, to produce LNG and natural gas liquids (NGL) for export. The plant was built by TSKJ consortium, which was led by former Halliburton's subsidiary KBR. Other participants of the consortium were Snamprogetti, Technip and JGC Corporation. The first train came into operation in 1999.

In September 1999, the Bonny plant started production and was expected to send its first shipment in October. It started with sales contracts with Enel for 3.5 billion bcm/y, Enagás for 1.6 bcm/y, BOTAŞ for 1.2 bcm/y, and Gaz de France for 500 million cu m/year. The feed gas was provided by Shell, Elf Aquitaine and Agip.

There are investigations concerning alleged bribes of $180 million paid by the TSKJ consortium of engineering companies to Nigerian government officials (not Nigeria LNG staff) in the period 1994–2004 to obtain contracts worth more than $6 billion to win the contract to build Nigeria LNG facilities. KBR pleaded guilty, in February 2009, to paying bribes to Nigerian government officials to secure four contracts to build and expand the Nigeria LNG terminal. In Italy, Milan's prosecutors office has begun legal proceedings to bar Eni and Saipem, owners of Snamprogetti, from doing business with NNPC because of these alleged bribes paid by the TSKJ consortium to Nigerian government officials. Snamprogetti will pay $240 million in fines to avoid prosecution by the United States Department of Justice for violation of the Foreign Corrupt Practices Act. In addition, Eni and Snamprogetti will pay $125 million to settle a U.S. Securities and Exchange Commission case.

In 2013, NLNG signed an agreement with Samsung Heavy Industries and Hyundai Heavy Industries for the delivery of 4 LNG carrier ships that cost US$1.2 billion and that brought NLNG's total fleet to 23 ships.

In 2015, NLNG reported a 36.6% drop in its revenue due to declining oil and gas prices (US$6.84 billion in 2015, US$10.8 billion in 2014). 2015 was the year that NLNG reached the threshold of US$85 billion of LNG exports in 15 years of business.

In July 2016, Tony Attah was named managing director and CEO of Nigeria LNG. He replaced Babs Omotowa who led the company for 5 years and returned to Shell International in the Hague, Netherlands, after his departure. In August 2016, Shell declared Force majeure on most of its feed gas to the facility after a gas leak on Shell's Eastern Gas Gathering System (EGGS-1), but production kept going thanks to alternative sources of gas supplies.

In July 2021, the board of directors appointed Philip Mshelbila as the new Managing Director and Chief Executive Officer of the company. He took over from Tony Attah who was appointed by the board in July 2016.

In February 2022, the board of directors appointed Olalekan Olufemi Ogunleye as the new deputy managing director of the company. He took over from Sadeeq Mai-Bornu who was appointed by the board in April 2016.

== Operations ==
Nigeria LNG Limited is jointly owned in the following proportions: Nigerian National Petroleum Corporation (NNPC) owns 49%, Shell Gas B.V. owns 25.6%, Total LNG Nigeria Ltd owns 15% and Eni International owns 10.4%.

Nigeria LNG Limited operates six liquefaction units (LNG trains) producing 22 million tonnes per year of LNG. This amounts to roughly 10% of the world's LNG consumption. Trains 1, 2 and 3 have production capacities of 3.2 million tonnes per year, whilst trains 4, 5 and 6 have capacities of 4.1 million tonnes per year each.

The base project (Trains 1 and 2) which cost US$3.6 billion, was financed by NLNG's shareholders. The third train (expansion project), including additional storage, cost US$1.8 billion and was funded by shareholders as well as reinvested revenue from the base project. The NLNGPlus project (Trains 4 & 5) cost US$2.2 billion and was funded with a combination of internally generated revenue and third party loans amounting to US$1.06 billion. Train 6 (NLNGSix project) cost US$1.748 billion, financing was handled by shareholders. The total cost of building six LNG trains was US$9.348 billion.

The company has a wholly–owned subsidiary set up in 1989, Bonny Gas Transport (BGT) Limited, which provides shipping services for NLNG. BGT was set up in Bermuda with an ordinary equity holding from Nigeria LNG Limited and preferential equity holding from the sponsors, NLNG's shareholders.

Another wholly owned subsidiary of Nigeria LNG Limited is Nigeria LNG Ship Manning Limited (NSML), which was set up in 2008 to give dedicated attention to providing, developing and managing high calibre personnel for NLNG's maritime business.

== Sponsorship ==
Nigeria LNG Limited (in partnership with the Nigerian Academy of Science and the Nigerian Academy of Letters) sponsors the Nigeria Prize for Science and the Nigeria Prize for Literature.
