= Nakilat =

Qatari shipping and maritime company

Qatar Gas Transport Company Limited (Nakilat)
- Native name: شركة قطر لنقل الغاز المحدودة
- Type: Public
- Traded as: QE: QGTS
- Industry: Shipping
- Founded: 2004
- Headquarters: Doha, Qatar
- Key people: Abdulaziz Jassim Al-Muftah (Chairman); Eng. Abdullah Al Sulaiti (Chief Executive Officer) Hani Abuaker (Chief Finance Officer)
- Services: LNG transportation, Ship repair, conversion and refits, Industrial Fabrication, Towage, Shipping Agency services
- Revenue: QAR 4.78 billion
- Total assets: QAR 36.43 billion
- Website: Nakilat.com

Qatar Gas Transport Company Limited, commonly known as Nakilat (Arabic: شركة قطر لنقل الغاز المحدودة, ناقلات) is a Qatari shipping and maritime company. Its LNG shipping fleet is one of the largest in the world, comprising 70 vessels. The company also jointly owns one Floating Storage Regasification Unit (FSRU). Through its in-house ship management, Nakilat manages and operates 25 LNG carriers.

Via its subsidiary and joint venture – Qatar Shipyard Technology Solution and Qatar Fabrication Company (QFAB) – Nakilat operates the ship repair and offshore construction facilities at Erhama Bin Jaber Al Jalahma Shipyard in the State of Qatar's Port of Ras Laffan.

Nakilat also provides shipping agency services through Nakilat Agency Company (NAC) for the Ports of Ras Laffan and Mesaieed and warehousing for vessels in Qatari waters via Nakilat's Vessel Support Unit (VSU). Joint venture Nakilat- SvitzerWijsmuller (NSW) offers marine support services at the Port of Ras Laffan and at the State of Qatar's offshore activity around Halul Island.

== Fleet ==
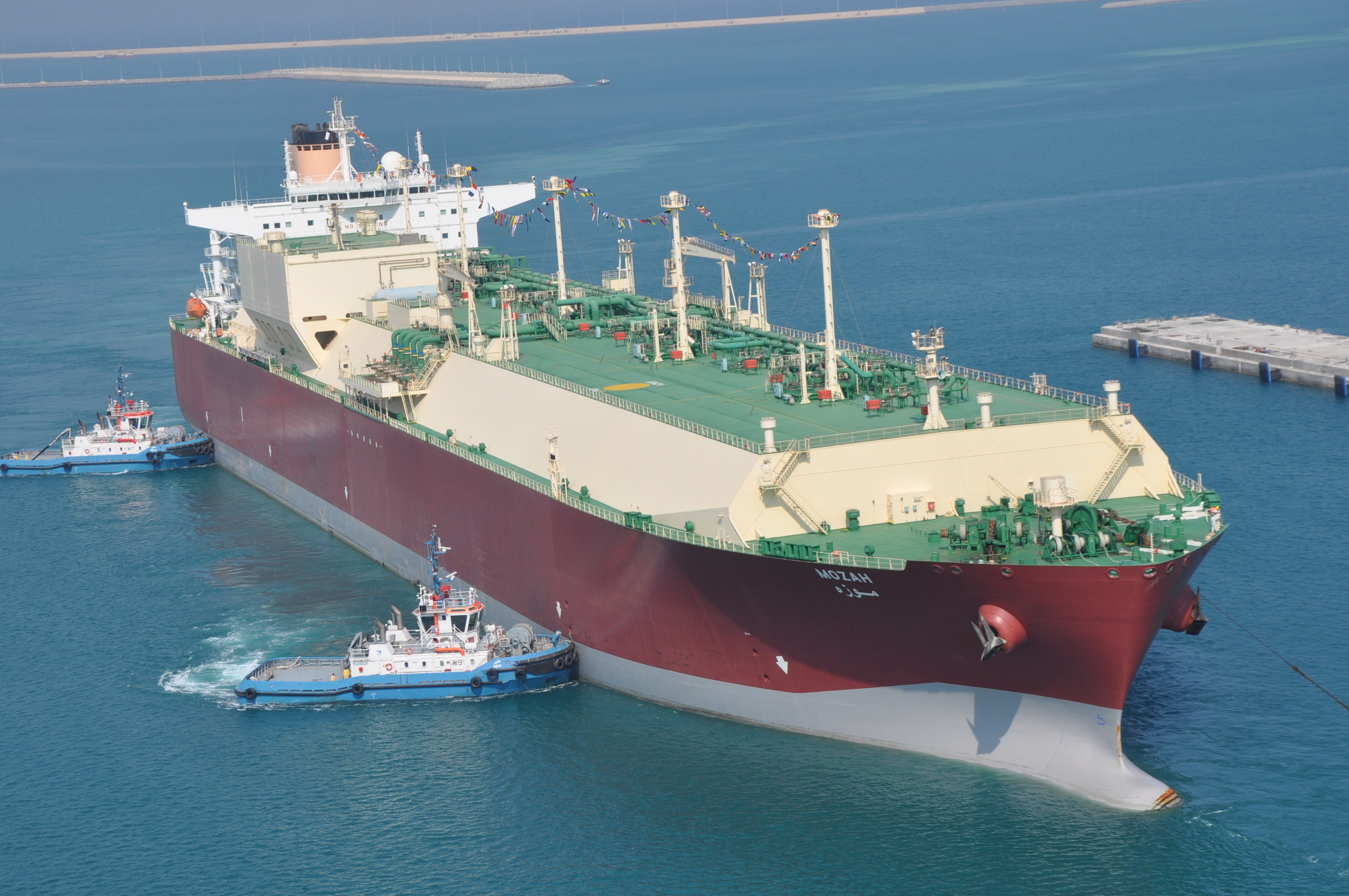
Mozah, Nakilat's flagship vessel, at Ras Laffan

Nakilat is one of the largest owners of liquefied natural gas (LNG) carriers in the world, with a fleet comprising 69 LNG carriers.

Its LNG carriers represent a total investment of approximately US$11 billion and have a combined carrying capacity of over 13 million cubic meters or about 11% of global LNG shipping capacity. The vast majority of these LNG carriers are dedicated to meeting the transportation requirements of Qatar's massive LNG industry.

Most of Nakilat's vessels are employed through long-term time charter agreements with local gas producer QatarEnergy LNG, while the remainder of the fleet is utilized in international shipping markets. Its jointly owned LNG carriers are operated by the vessel's co-owners.

In addition to the 69 LNG carriers, Nakilat jointly owns one Floating Storage Regasification Unit (FSRU) with Excelerate Energy USA. 25 LNG carriers are managed and operated by Nakilat Shipping Qatar Limited (NSQL), a wholly owned subsidiary of Nakilat.

== Erhama Bin Jaber Al Jalahma Shipyard ==
Nakilat operates the world-class Erhama Bin Jaber Al Jalahma Shipyard in Ras Laffan Industrial City. Inaugurated on 23 November 2010, the shipyard offers ship repair and conversion as well as industrial fabrication, repair and maintenance services via The Company's subsidiary, Qatar Shipyard Technology Solutions and joint-venture Qatar Fabrication Company (QFAB).

Qatar Shipyard Technology Solutions is a subsidiary of Nakilat that offers ship repair and conversion for all types of marine vessels as well as fabrication and maintenance services for industrial structures.

QFAB is a joint-venture between Nakilat and McDermott International. Located within the Erhama Bin Jaber Al Jalahma Shipyard complex in Ras Laffan Industrial City, QFAB offers services such as the fabrication, construction and assembly of offshore and onshore structures. This includes pipe fabrication, module fabrication and assembly, field as well as modular construction for onshore structures.

== Marine services ==
Nakilat offers marine and support services to all types of vessels operating in Qatari waters, including at ports and terminals in Qatar. These services were established for ships requiring supplies and amenities off the Qatari coast.

Nakilat's towage services are managed by Nakilat SvitzerWisjmuller (NSW) , a joint venture established in 2006 between Nakilat and Svitzer Middle East Limited. The latter is part of international towage operator Svitzer, which is wholly owned by Danish shipping group A. P. Moller (Maersk). NSW operates a fleet of 26 vessels, which includes 25 NSW-owned vessels. The fleet comprises tug boats, pilot boats, line boats, crew boats and other harbor craft, based in the Port of Ras Laffan as well as operating in the offshore fields off Halul Island. NSW offers a range of services including towing, escorting, berthing, pilot support, line handling services afloat and ashore, emergency response, and marine maintenance support.

Nakilat Agency Company Ltd. (NAC) is a shipping agency in Qatar, owned 95 per cent by Nakilat and 5 per cent by QatarEnergy. The agency provides services such as handling all port and regulatory matters for vessels loading, offloading and attending the shipyard at the Port of Ras Laffan. These services include agency and logistics support, global hub agency, husbandry, bunker coordination, provision of spares and suppliers, crew change and administration, drydocking support and facilitating customs formalities.

== Shareholders ==
As of 31 December 2025, Shareholders who own, directly or indirectly (5%) or more of Company's capital, source: Edaa are: Milaha and General Retirement & Social Insurance Authority - Civil Fund.

== Recent achievements ==
=== LNG fleet expansion ===
In May 2024, Qatar Gas Transport Company Limited (Nakilat) announced the signing of a long-term agreement to charter and operate nine QC-Max class LNG vessels, as part of QatarEnergy’s program to expand its fleet of LNG carriers. The agreement was signed by His Excellency Saad Sherida Al-Kaabi, Minister of State for Energy Affairs, Vice Chairman, President & CEO of QatarEnergy, and Eng. Abdullah Al Sulaiti, CEO of Nakilat during a special signing ceremony at QatarEnergy’s Headquarters. These nine (QC-Max) vessels, each with a capacity of 271,000 cubic meters, will be 100% owned and operated by Nakilat and chartered to affiliates of QatarEnergy. The vessels will be built in China at Hudong-Zhonghua shipyards. They are part of QatarEnergy’s historic program to support its LNG production expansion capacity from the North Field.

In March 2024, Qatar Gas Transport Company Limited (Nakilat) announced that it signed with QatarEnergy the long-term charter party agreements for 25 Conventional LNG Vessels as part of QatarEnergy’s historic LNG fleet expansion program. QatarEnergy selected Nakilat to be the owner and operator of these vessels according to long-term charter contracts. The LNG carriers, each with a capacity of 174,000 cubic meters, will be owned 100% by Nakilat and chartered to affiliates of QatarEnergy.

In January 2024, Nakilat announced a strategic shipping expansion through a significant vessel acquisition. Nakilat has placed orders with Hyundai Samho Heavy Industries (HSHI) of South Korea for the construction of six gas vessels (two cutting-edge LNG carriers with a cargo capacity of 174,000 cubic meters each and four modern Very Large LPG/ Ammonia Gas carriers, with a substantial cargo capacity of 88,000 cubic meters.) These vessels, which will incorporate modern advancements in propulsion system efficiency, are set to be delivered between 2026 and 2027.

The new LNG and LPG carriers will utilize more modern environmentally friendly propulsion systems through fuel-saving devices, for a greater emphasis on sustainability.

=== LNG ship management ===
In June 2012, full responsibility for the management and operations of Nakilat's four LPG carriers was transferred from Shell to Nakilat Shipping Qatar Limited (NSQL). In 2014 NSQL assumed ship management responsibility for the four Nakilat / OSG Q-Flex LNG vessels in a challenging timeframe, commencing in February and completing in July of the same year, bringing the number of gas vessels fully managed by NSQL to eight. As part of the company's long-term strategic vision for growth, Nakilat then undertook one of the largest vessel management transitions with Shell, involving the transfer of management of 10 LNG carriers from Shell to NSQL. The transition was completed within a year in August 2017. In March 2019, Nakilat signed an agreement with Maran Ventures to establish a new joint venture and expand its fleet with an additional four LNG carriers that will be managed by NSQL once delivered. With the four newbuild LNG carriers added to its fleet, NSQL currently manages 18 LNG carriers and four LPG carriers.

=== Expansion into FSRU market ===
In June 2018, Nakilat signed a landmark agreement with Excelerate Energy USA to establish a joint-venture company and acquire a 55% interest in a Floating Storage Regasification Unit (FSRU), the first such vessel to join the Nakilat fleet. This was the first FSRU co-owned by a Qatari company, paving the way for Qatari liquefied natural gas (LNG) to expand its outreach to developing and emerging markets.

A FSRU acts as a hub for LNG deliveries. Located in Port Qasim in Pakistan, the FSRU unit 'Exquisite' has a capacity of 150,900 cubic meters and a peak regasification rate of 745 million cubic feet per day.

=== JV established for Offshore and Onshore fabrication ===
Nakilat signed an agreement with McDermott to form a joint-venture (JV) company, Qatar Fabrication Company (QFAB), providing offshore and onshore fabrication services in Qatar in February 2019. This is aimed at increasing productivity levels at Nakilat's Erhama Bin Jaber Al Jalahma Shipyard and developing local construction capabilities to support the increasing demand for construction of offshore and onshore structures in Qatar. This new JV comes at a strategic time, with Qatar's ambition to localize its energy sector's supply chain and increase its liquefied natural gas production from 77 to 110 million tonnes per annum in the coming years.

The JV company will be operated from Nakilat's shipyard in Ras Laffan Industrial City, comprising extensive fabrication areas and facilities such as a 270-metre construction hall and a 180-metre assembly workshop featuring four bays.
